= List of Men's World Ice Hockey Championship players for Australia =

Australia has participated in 33 of 81 Ice Hockey World Championships, an annual ice hockey tournament organised by the International Ice Hockey Federation (IIHF). Australia first participated in 1962 where they were placed in Pool B and finished the tournament in 13th, only ahead of Denmark. Following a 12-year absence from the tournament Australia rejoined and participated in Pool C for the 1974 championships. Throughout the next three decades Australia moved between Pool C and Pool D due to the relegation system in place. Starting in 2001 the IIHF implemented a new system of grouping in which Australia was placed in Division II. As of 2017 Australia are competing in Division II Group A having gained promotion in 2016 from Division II Group B. Ice Hockey Australia is responsible for the Australian team roster and operations.

== Key ==
Tournaments
"Year" B	"Year" IIHF World Championship Pool B
"Year" C	"Year" IIHF World Championship Pool C
"Year" D	"Year" IIHF World Championship Pool D
"Year" IA	"Year" IIHF World Championship Division I Group A
"Year" IB	"Year" IIHF World Championship Division I Group B
"Year" IIA	"Year" IIHF World Championship Division II Group A
"Year" IIB	"Year" IIHF World Championship Division II Group B

IIHF Directorate Awards
Best Goaltender	(Year, Division, Group)
Best Defenceman	(Year, Division, Group)
Best Forward	(Year, Division, Group)

Statistics
WCs	Number of World Championships	GP	Games played
SO	Shutouts	GA	Goals against
GAA	Goals against average	MIN	Minutes played
G	Goals	A	Assists
P	Points	PIM	Penalty minutes

== Goaltenders ==
Player	WCs	Tournament(s)	GP	Min	GA	GAA	Gold	Silver	Bronze	Total	Notes
Alan Becken	9	1996 D, 1997 D, 1998 D, 1999 D, 2000 D, 2001 IIA, 2002 IIA, 2003 IIA, 2004 IIA	43	969	78	4.83	0	1 ('98)	4 ('99, '00, '01, '04)	5	
Ronald Black	1	1989 C	5	123	21	10.24	0	0	0	0	
Peter Boyle	1	1989 C	2	5	2	24.00	0	0	0	0	
Joshua Broekman	1	2015 IIA	1	34	4	7.05	0	0	0	0	
Fraser Carson	2	2014 IIA, 2015 IIA	5	271	26	5.76	0	0	0	0	
Peter Cavanagh	1	1962 B					0	0	0	0	
Tony Cooper	1	1979 C	7				0	0	0	0	
Paul Cracknell	2	1992 C, 1993 C	2	60	3	3.00	0	0	1 ('92)	1	
Stuart Denman	6	2005 IIA, 2006 IIB, 2007 IIB, 2008 IIB, 2009 IA, 2011 IIA	28	478	23	2.89	2 ('08, '11)	2 ('05, '07)	1 ('06)	5	
Jason Elliott	1	1993 C	3	180	33	11.00	0	0	0	0	
Matthew Ezzy	8	2004 IIA, 2005 IIA, 2006 IIB, 2007 IIB, 2008 IIB, 2009 IA, 2010 IIA, 2011 IIA	38	1480	71	2.88	2 ('08, '11)	3 ('05, '07, '10)	1 ('04, '06)	6	Best Goaltender (2007 IIB, 2008 IIB)
Damian Fenton	1	1996 D	5				0	0	0	0	
Paul Groves	2	1986 C, 1987 D	7	18	3	10.00	1 ('87)	0	0	0	
Emanuael Hadjigeorgiou	1	1987 D	7	240	6	1.50	1 ('87)	0	0	1	
Barry Harkin	2	1974 C, 1979 C	7				0	0	0	0	
Damian Holland	6	1986 C, 1989 C, 1990 D, 1992 C, 1994 C, 1995 C	21	772	60	4.66	0	1 ('90)	1 ('92)	2	Best Goaltender (1990 D, 1992 C)
Tim Hulme	3	1992 C, 1993 C, 1994 C	10	180	21	7.00	0	0	1 ('92)	1	
Anthony Kimlin	6	2010 IIA, 2012 IB, 2013 IIA, 2014 IIA, 2016 IIB, 2017 IIA	30	1526	76	2.99	1 ('16)	2 ('10, '17)	0	3	Best Goaltender (2016 IIB, 2017 IIA)
Ron Klajnblat	1	1990 D	4				0	1 ('90)	0	1	
Chris Leetham	1	2003 IIA	5	180	15	5.00	0	0	0	0	
David Mann	1	1995 C	1	60	10	10.00	0	0	0	0	
Olivier Martin	2	2012 IB, 2013 IIA	5	60	6	6.00	0	0	0	0	
Milan Novysedlak	2	1998 D, 1999 D	9	469	20	2.56	0	1 ('98)	1 ('99)	2	
Charlie Smart	2	2016 IIB, 2017 IIA	2	49	0	0.00	1 ('16)	0	0	1	
Conor White	3	2000 D, 2001 IIA, 2002 IIA	12	223	26	7.00	0	0	2 ('00, '01)	2	
Anders Wiking	1	1974 C					0	0	0	0	
Nicholas Windle	2	1997 D, 2001 IIA	7	40	3	4.50	0	0	1 ('01)	1	

== Skaters ==
Player	WCs	Tournament(s)	GP	G	A	P	PIM	Gold	Silver	Bronze	Total	Notes
James Alexander	1	1992 C						0	0	1 ('92)	1	
David Allen	1	1987 D	7	8	7	15	6	1 ('87)	0	0	1	
Tevor Allen	1	1993 C	2	0	1	1	0	0	0	0	0	
Jason Andrijasevic	1	1997 D	4	0	0	0	2	0	0	0	0	
Brad Andrlon	2	1989 C, 1998 D	12	0	1	1	12	0	1 ('98)	0	1	
Kelly Armitage	2	1986 C, 1987 D	7	3	7	10	0	1 ('87)	0	0	1	
Robert Avey	2	1993 C, 1996 D	8	1	1	2	8	0	0	0	0	
Jonathan Bale	1	2013 IIA	5	0	0	0	0	0	0	0	0	
Trevor Banks	1	1995 C	6	0	0	0	28	0	0	0	0	
Paul Baranzelli	3	2015 IIA, 2016 IIB, 2017 IIA	15	5	7	12	2	1 ('16)	1 ('17)	0	2	Best Defenceman (2016 IIB)
David Batho	5	1993 C, 1994 C, 1996 D, 2000 D, 2003 IIA	24	5	3	8	29	0	0	1 ('00)	1	
Sam Bavin	1	2003 IIA	5	0	0	0	0	0	0	0	0	
Michael Beaton	1	2010 IIA	5	1	3	4	2	0	1 ('10)	0	1	
Radomir Benicky	6	1992 C, 1993 C, 1994 C, 1996 D, 1998 D, 2000 D	22	0	2	2	16	0	1 ('98)	2 ('92, '00)	3	
Chris Blagg	5	1990 D, 1992 C, 1993 C, 1994 C, 1996 D	19	3	0	3	16	0	1 ('90)	1 ('92)	2	
Pavel Bohacik	5	1992 C, 1993 C, 1994 C, 1998 D, 1999 D	19	2	1	3	6	0	1 ('98)	2 ('92, '99)	3	
Michael Boileau	2	1974 C, 1979 C	7	1	1	2	2	0	0	0	0	
John Botterill	1	1987 D	7	15	23	38	6	1 ('87)	0	0	1	
Barry Bourke	1	1962 B						0	0	0	0	
Jamie Bourke	1	2010 IIA	5	3	1	4	6	0	1 ('10)	0	1	
Chris Brlecic	3	2005 IIA, 2006 IIB, 2007 IIB	14	2	8	10	20	0	2 ('05, '07)	1 ('06)	3	
Paul Brockwell	1	1986 C						0	0	0	0	
Andrew Brunt	3	1992 C, 1994 C, 1995 C	11	3	1	4	6	0	0	1 ('92)	1	
Don Burke	3	2004 IIA, 2005 IIA, 2006 IIB	10	0	1	1	39	0	1 ('05)	2 ('04, '06)	3	
James Byers	3	2014 IIA, 2015 IIA, 2016 IIB	15	2	4	6	10	1 ('16)	0	0	1	
Angus Campbell	1	2001 IIA	5	0	0	0	4	0	0	1 ('01)	1	
Jack Carpenter	1	2017 IIA	5	0	1	1	4	0	1 ('17)	0	1	
Nigel Chandler	2	1989 C, 1995 C	13	3	1	4	0	0	0	0	0	
Jamie Chivers	3	1998 D, 1999 D, 2000 D	13	1	3	4	24	0	1 ('98)	2 ('99, '00)	3	
Fred Christen	1	1986 C						0	0	0	0	
Jim Christie	1	1974 C						0	0	0	0	
Aaron Clayworth	4	2007 IIB, 2008 IIB, 2011 IIA, 2012 IB	18	3	2	5	6	2 ('08, '11)	1 ('07)	0	3	
Billy Cliff	3	2013 IIA, 2014 IIA, 2017 IIA	15	2	6	8	10	0	1 ('17)	0	1	
Charles Cooper	7	1987 D, 1993 C, 1994 C, 1995 C, 1997 D, 2001 IIA, 2002 IIA	37	47	56	103	60	1 ('87)	0	1 ('01)	2	
Darren Corstens	2	2013 IIA, 2014 IIA	10	3	4	7	4	0	0	0	0	
Darren Croft	1	2002 IIA	5	0	1	1	0	0	0	0	0	
Gary Croft	2	1974 C, 1979 C	7	0	1	1	18	0	0	0	0	
Alex D'jamirze	1	2005 IIA	5	1	2	3	4	0	1 ('05)	0	1	
Kevin Darcy	1	2013 IIA	5	0	1	1	0	0	0	0	0	
Wehebe Darge	5	2010 IIA, 2013 IIA, 2015 IIA, 2016 IIB, 2017 IIA	25	19	21	40	8	1 ('16)	2 ('10, '17)	0	3	
Scott Davidson	2	1989 C	14	24	25	49	20	1 ('87)	1 ('10)	0	2	Team Captain (1989)
Gavin Davies	1	2005 IIA	5	0	0	0	0	0	1 ('05)	0	1	
Joseph De Lisle	1	1994 C	5	1	5	6	14	0	0	0	0	
Steven Deans	2	2002 IIA, 2003 IIA	10	1	4	5	0	0	0	0	0	
Riccardo Del Basso	2	2009 IA, 2012 IB	10	0	0	0	2	0	0	0	0	
Cassian Delsar	2	2007 IIB, 2010 IIA	9	1	3	4	8	0	2 ('07, '10)	0	2	
Robin Dewhurst	1	1962 B						0	0	0	0	
Carl Di Piazza	6	1992 C, 1993 C, 1997 D, 1998 D, 2000 D, 2001 IIA	24	5	4	9	2	0	1 ('98)	3 ('92, '00, '01)	4	
Con Dionissiou	2	1996 D, 1997 D	9	0	0	0	4	0	0	0	0	
Serge Domeniconi	1	1986 C						0	0	0	0	
Paul Doney	1	1987 D	7	12	14	26	2	1 ('87)	0	0	1	
Steve Duncan	1	1974 C						0	0	0	0	
David Dunwoodie	3	2007 IIB, 2009 IA, 2015 IIA	13	0	1	1	12	0	1 ('07)	0	1	
John Ekberg	2	1979 C, 1987 D	14	6	8	14	8	1 ('87)	0	0	1	
David Emblem	1	1987 D	7	15	18	33	4	1 ('87)	0	0	1	
Adrian Esposito	2	2008 IIB, 2009 IA	6	0	0	0	0	1 ('08)	0	0	1	
David Fehily	1	1979 C	7	0	1	1	0	0	0	0	0	
Glen Foll	16	1989 C, 1990 D, 1992 C, 1993 C, 1994 C, 1995 C, 1997 D, 1998 D, 1999 D, 2000 D, 2001 IIA, 2002 IIA, 2003 IIA, 2004 IIA, 2005 IIA, 2006 IIB	75	20	45	65	30	0	3 ('90, '98, '05)	6 ('92, '99, '00, '01, '04, '06)	9	Team Captain (1990, 1992, 1993, 1994, 1997, 1998, 1999, 2000, 2001, 2002, 2003, 2004, 2005, 2006)
Roberto Franchini	2	2009 IA, 2010 IIA	10	3	5	8	10	0	1 ('10)	0	1	
Brian Funes	3	2013 IIA, 2015 IIA, 2017 IIA	15	0	1	1	29	0	1 ('17)	0	1	
Jim Fuyarchuck	2	1986 C, 1987 D	7	3	6	9	4	1 ('87)	0	0	1	
Sandy Gardner	5	1974 C, 1979 C, 1986 C, 1987 D, 1989 C	21	24	19	43	6	1 ('87)	0	0	1	Team Captain (1986)
Trevor Gardner	2	1974 C, 1979 C	7	0	0	0	0	0	0	0	0	
Jordan Gavin	2	2011 IIA, 2012 IB	9	1	0	1	8	1 ('11)	0	0	1	
Daniel George	4	2002 IIA, 2003 IIA, 2004 IIA, 2005 IIA	20	0	2	2	6	0	1 ('05)	1 ('04)	2	
Adam Geric	2	2014 IIA, 2015 IIA	10	2	1	3	4	0	0	0	0	
Glen Gilbert	1	1974 C						0	0	0	0	
Michael Gough	1	2008 IIB	5	2	1	3	2	1 ('08)	0	0	1	
Todd Graham	4	2011 IIA, 2012 IB, 2013 IIA, 2014 IIA	19	3	2	5	45	1 ('11)	0	0	1	
Charles Grandy	1	1974 C1979 C	7	0	0	0	4	0	0	0	0	Team Captain (1974, 1979)
Glenn Grandy	5	1990 D, 1992 C, 1995 C, 1996 D, 1997 D	20	2	3	5	10	0	1 ('90)	1 ('92)	2	
Guy Grant	3	1979 C, 1986 C, 1987 D	14	18	16	34	4	1 ('87)	0	0	1	
Sean Greer	1	2012 IB, 2013 IIA	10	0	0	0	4	0	0	0	0	
Daniel Gunn	2	2001 IIA, 2003 IIA	5	2	4	6	2	0	0	1 ('01)	1	
Andrew Hall	1	1987 D	7	11	10	21	0	1 ('87)	0	0	1	
Joshua Harding	7	2006 IIB, 2007 IIB, 2008 IIB, 2009 IA, 2012 IB, 2014 II, 2015 IIA	31	5	3	8	18	1 ('08)	1 ('07)	1 ('06)	3	
Kevin Harris	1	1962 B						0	0	0	0	
Laing Harrow	4	1997 D, 1998 D, 1999 D, 2000 D	18	5	11	16	14	0	1 ('98)	2 ('99, '00)	3	
Michael Harrow	4	1997 D, 1998 D, 1999 D, 2001 IIA	19	17	9	26	14	0	1 ('98)	1 ('01)	2	
Allan Harvey	1	1974 C						0	0	0	0	
Graham Heath	1	1974 C						0	0	0	0	
Malcolm Heath	2	1974 C, 1979 C	7	1	1	2	6	0	0	0	0	
Stuart Higgins	2	1996 D, 1997 D	9	0	0	0	33	0	0	0	0	
Denis Holmes	1	1974 C						0	0	0	0	
Ian Holmes	1	1974 C						0	0	0	0	
Phil Hora	6	1990 D, 1992 C1993 C, 1994 C, 1996 D, 1998 D	24	4	1	5	32	0	1 ('90, '98)	0	2	
John Horsnell	2	1974 C, 1979 C	7	0	0	0	4	0	0	0	0	
Ross Howell	2	2001 IIA, 2003 IIA	10	1	4	5	2	0	0	2 ('92, '01)	2	
Joseph Hughes	7	2004 IIA, 2005 IIA, 2006 IIB, 2007 IIB, 2008 IIB, 2011 IIA, 2012 IB	31	22	19	41	65	2 ('08, '11)	2 ('05, '07)	2 ('04, '06)	6	Best Forward (2011 IIA)
Vincent Hughes	2	2002 IIA, 2003 IIA	10	2	1	3	8	0	0	0	0	
Mitchell Humphries	4	2014 IIA, 2015 IIA, 2016 IIB, 2017 IIA	20	10	10	20	14	1 ('16)	1 ('17)	0	2	
Craig Hutchinson	1	1989 C	7	3	3	6	8	0	0	0	0	
David Huxley	10	2009 IA, 2010 IIA, 2011 IIA, 2013 IIA, 2015 IIA, 2016 IIB	28	2	8	10	8	2 ('11, '16)	1 ('10)	0	3	
Greg Hyde	1	2012 IB	5	0	1	1	0	0	0	0	0	
Alex Ignatovich	2	1992 C, 1993 C	3	0	0	0	0	0	0	1 ('92)	1	
Darren Johnson	2	1990 D, 1992 C	4	0	0	0	0	0	1 ('90)	1 ('92)	2	
Russell Johnson	1	1986 C						0	0	0	0	
Todd Johnson	4	1990 D, 1992 C, 1993 C, 1994 C	14	8	6	14	22	0	1 ('90)	1 ('92)	2	
Howard Jones	9	1986 C, 1989 C, 1990 D, 1992 C, 1993 C, 1994 C, 1995 C, 1996 D, 1997 D	36	5	9	14	26	0	1 ('90)	1 ('92)	2	Team Captain (1996)
Russell Jones	1	1962 B						0	0	0	0	
Sean Jones	2	2013 IIA, 2016 IIB	9	0	4	4	29	1 ('16)	0	0	1	
James Keane	2	2006 IIB, 2007 IIB	9	3	1	4	2	0	1 ('07)	1 ('06)	2	
Jim Kinlough	2	1990 D, 1994 C	9	0	1	1	10	0	1 ('90)	0	1	
Andrew Kirkham	2	1989 C, 1995 C	13	5	0	5	14	0	0	0	0	
Miroslav Klima	4	1996 D, 1997 D, 1998 D, 2000 D	18	4	3	7	8	0	1 ('98)	1 ('00)	2	
Barry Koski	1	1979 C	7	0	0	0	4	0	0	0	0	
Mike Kris	1	1974 C						0	0	0	0	
Casey Kubara	1	2015 IIA	5	0	0	0	0	0	0	0	0	
David Kudla	2	2013 IIA, 2014 IIA	10	0	2	2	4	0	0	0	0	
Ron Kuprowski	1	1996 D	5	2	0	2	16	0	0	0	0	
Jordan Kyros	4	2012 IB, 2013 IIA, 2015 IIA, 2016 IIB	20	1	6	7	6	1 ('16)	0	0	1	
Matthew Lehoczky	1	2003 IIA	5	0	0	0	10	0	0	0	0	
David Lewis	2	1997 D, 1999 D	9	0	0	0	4	0	0	1 ('99)	1	
David Lindsay	1	1979 C	7	2	0	2	2	0	0	0	0	
Mathew Lindsay	2	2016 IIB, 2017 IIA	10	0	2	2	2	1 ('16)	1 ('17)	0	2	
Chris Logue	2	1993 C, 2002 IIA	10	4	3	7	16	0	0	0	0	
Tyler Lovering	9	1998 D, 1999 D, 2000 D, 2001 IIA, 2002 IIA, 2003 IIA, 2004 IIA, 2006 IIB, 2008 IIB	43	16	28	44	24	1 ('08)	1 ('98)	5 ('99, '00, '01, '04, '06)	7	
Glen Lynch	1	1986 C						0	0	0	0	
Robert Malloy	3	2015 IIA, 2016 IIB, 2017 IIA	15	4	15	19	6	1 ('16)	1 ('17)	0	2	
Arto Malste	4	1987 D, 1989 C, 1990 D, 1995 C	22	13	17	30	21	1 ('87)	1 ('90)	0	2	
Tomas Manco	6	2007 IIB, 2009 IA, 2010 IIA, 2011 IIA, 2012 IB, 2013 IIA	28	1	3	4	32	1 ('11)	2 ('07, '10)	0	3	
David Mann	1	1995 C	5	0	1	1	12	0	0	0	0	
Elliott Mann	1	1989 C	7	0	0	0	6	0	0	0	0	
Ronald Mann	1	1979 C	7	1	1	2	2	0	0	0	0	
Vic Mansted	1	1962 B						0	0	0	0	
Tony Martyr, Sr.	1	1962 B						0	0	0	0	
Peter Matus	3	2004 IIA, 2005 IIA, 2006 IIB	15	0	6	6	12	0	1 ('05)	2 ('04, '06)	3	
Paul McCorquadale	2	1992 C, 1993 C	5	1	1	2	8	0	0	1 ('92)	1	
Brendan McDowell	2	2014 IIA, 2015 IIA	10	3	3	6	0	0	0	0	0	
Scott McEwing	1	1986 C						0	0	0	0	
Shannon McGregor	2	2014 IIA, 2015 IIA	10	0	1	1	12	0	0	0	0	
Adam McGuiness	2	1990 D, 1992 C	4	0	1	1	0	0	1 ('90)	('92)	2	
Austin McKenzie	3	2014 IIA, 2015 IIA, 2016 IIB	15	6	1	7	4	('16)	0	0	1	
Lee McLauchlan	1	2003 IIA	5	0	0	0	2	0	0	0	0	
Richard McLean	2	1987 D, 1989 C	14	5	4	9	12	1 ('87)	0	0	1	
Kai Miettinen	1	2017 IIA	5	0	0	0	6	0	1 ('17)	0	1	
Vladimir Mihall	2	1986 C, 1987 D	7	14	17	31	9	1 ('87)	0	0	1	
Casey Minson	2	2008 IIB, 2009 IA	10	0	0	0	2	1 ('08)	0	0	1	
Ross Moffat	1	1994 C	5	0	0	0	0	0	0	0	0	
Richard Moon	1	2001 IIA	5	0	0	0	12	0	0	1 ('01)	1	
Troy Morgan	2	1993 C, 1994 C	10	2	0	2	2	0	0	0	0	
Jon Moses	2	1999 D, 2001 IIA	9	3	6	9	4	0	0	2 ('99, '01)	2	
Richard Motteram	2	1986 C, 1989 C	7	0	0	0	2	0	0	0	0	
Shaun Muller	4	1996 D, 1997 D, 1998 D, 2000 D	18	0	0	0	18	0	1 ('98)	1 ('00)	2	
Ted Muster	1	1962 B						0	0	0	0	
Patrick Nadin	1	2017 IIA	5	0	0	0	0	0	1 ('17)	0	1	
Charles Naish	1	1989 C	7	0	2	2	4	0	0	0	0	
Brett Nelson-Bond	6	2002 IIA, 2003 IIA, 2004 IIA, 2005 IIA, 2006 IIB, 2007 IIB	29	10	8	18	28	0	2 ('05, '07)	2 ('04, '06)	4	
Paul Nesterczuk	3	1992 C, 1993 C, 1995 C	8	0	0	0	4	0	0	1 ('92)	1	
Francois Nila	1	1989 C	7	1	0	1	2	0	0	0	0	
Ronald Nilsson	1	1987 D	7	3	8	11	2	1 ('87)	0	0	1	
Peter Nixon	1	1986 C						0	0	0	0	
Dusan Ocenas	1	1999 D	4	1	1	2	2	0	0	1 ('99)	1	
Greg Oddy	16	1998 D, 1999 D, 2000 D, 2002 IIA, 2003 IIA, 2004 IIA, 2005 IIA, 2006 IIB, 2007 IIB, 2008 IIB, 2009 IA, 2010 IIA, 2011 IIA, 2012 IB, 2014 IIA, 2015 IIA	72	64	52	116	135	2 ('08, '11)	4 ('98, '05, '07, '10)	4 ('99, '00, '04, '06)	10	Team Captain (2010, 2011, 2012, 2014); Best Forward (2008 IIB)
John Oddy	3	1998 D, 1999 D, 2002 IIA	12	8	20	28	36	0	1 ('98)	1 ('99)	2	
Sean Oultram	1	2010 IIA	5	0	0	0	4	0	1 ('10)	0	1	
Peter Parrot	1	1962 B						0	0	0	0	
Nicholas Paxton	1	2001 IIA	5	1	1	2	6	0	0	1 ('01)	1	
Dean Peterson	1	2010 IIA	5	1	1	2	0	0	1 ('10)	0	1	
Michael Pierce	1	1979 C	7	4	2	6	8	0	0	0	0	
Dean Pollock	2	1986 C, 1987 D	7	13	9	22	2	1 ('87)	0	0	1	
Russell Poste	1	1974 C						0	0	0	0	
Thomas Powell	9	2008 IIB, 2010 IIA, 2011 IIA, 2012 IB, 2013 IIA, 2014 IIA, 2015 IIA, 2016 IIB, 2017 IIA	41	11	26	37	14	3 ('08, '11, '16)	2 ('10, '17)	0	5	Team Captain (2015 – Game 1 only)
Matthew Price	1	2010 IIA	5	0	1	1	0	0	1 ('10)	0	1	
Ari Pullinen	1	1986 C						0	0	0	0	
John Purcell	1	1962 B						0	0	0	0	
Bill Renton	1	1962 B						0	0	0	0	
Josef Rezek	1	2017 IIA	5	5	1	6	2	0	1 ('17)	0	1	
Steve Riley	1	1996 D	4	0	0	0	0	0	0	0	0	
James Rintel	1	1989 C	7	0	1	1	0	0	0	0	0	
Phillip Ross	1	1990 D	4	0	0	0	0	0	1 ('90)	0	1	
Vladimir Rubes	8	2000 D, 2001 IIA, 2004 IIA, 2005 IIA, 2006 IIB, 2007 IIB, 2008 IIB, 2009 IA	34	17	21	38	14	1 ('08)	2 ('05, '07)	4 ('00, '01, '04, '06)	7	
Mark Rummukainen	13	2001 IIA, 2002 IIA, 2003 IIA, 2004 IIA, 2005 IIA, 2006 IIB, 2007 IIB, 2008 IIB, 2010 IIA, 2011 IIA, 2012 IB, 2014 IIA, 2016 IIB	63	5	21	26	50	3 ('08, '11, '16)	3 ('05, '07, '10)	3 ('01, '04, '06)	9	
Chris Rurak	5	1992 C, 1994 C, 1995 C, 1996 D, 1997 D	20	7	11	18	32	0	0	1 ('92)	1	
Kevin Sands	1	1987 D	7	14	14	28	6	1 ('87)	0	0	1	
Daniel Saunders	1	1979 C	7	0	0	0	11	0	0	0	0	
Michael Schlamp	4	2012 IB, 2013 IIA, 2014 IIA, 2016 IIB	20	7	7	14	32	1 ('16)	0	0	1	
Jarrod Scott	3	1990 D, 1993 C, 1997 D	13	1	2	3	14	0	1 ('90)	0	1	
Christopher Sekura	7	2004 IIA, 2005 IIA, 2006 IIB, 2007 IIB, 2008 IIB, 2010 IIA, 2011 IIA	33	13	24	37	18	2 ('08, '11)	3 ('05, '07, '10)	2 ('04, '06)	7	
Jarred Seymour	2	2009 IA, 2012 IB	10	1	4	5	8	0	0	0	0	
Paul Shumak	9	1995 C, 1996 D, 1997 D, 1998 D, 1999 D, 2000 D, 2001 IIA, 2002 IIA, 2004 IIA	43	11	12	23	30	0	1 ('98)	4 ('99, '00, '01, '04)	5	
Ron Shupka	1	1986 C						0	0	0	0	
Robert Smith	1	1989 C	7	1	0	1	12	0	0	0	0	
Chris Spike	1	1979 C	7	0	3	3	2	0	0	0	0	
Trevor Stables	1	1993 C	5	2	0	2	10	0	0	0	0	
Robert Stark	1	1990 D	4	1	0	1	0	0	1 ('90)	0	1	
Robert Starke	3	2008 IIB, 2009 IA, 2010 IIA	15	1	3	4	16	1 ('08)	1 ('10)	0	2	Team Captain (2009)
Scott Stephenson	8	2007 IIB, 2008 IIB, 2009 IA, 2010 IIA, 2011 IIA, 2012 IB, 2013 IIA, 2014 IIA	38	8	8	16	34	2 ('08, '11)	2 ('07, '10)	0	3	
Todd Stephenson	7	2007 IIB, 2009 IA, 2010 IIA, 2011 IIA, 2012 IB, 2013 IIA, 2014 IIA	32	7	4	11	20	1 ('11)	2 ('07, '10)	0	2	
Doug Stevenson	2	1979 C, 1995 C	13	1	1	2	6	0	0	0	0	
Vladan Stransky	2	2009 IA, 2011 IIA	9	1	6	7	16	1 ('11)	0	0	1	
Matt Stringer	1	2016 IIB	5	1	0	1	2	1 ('16)	0	0	1	
Greg Sturrock	2	2014 IIA, 2015 IIA	10	0	0	0	4	0	0	0	0	
Ronald Sullivan	2	1974 C, 1979 C	7	0	0	0	9	0	0	0	0	
Beau Taylor	1	2017 IIA	5	2	0	2	4	0	1 ('17)	0	1	
Jeff Taylor	2	1986 C, 1989 C	7	1	2	3	14	0	0	0	0	
Richard Tesarik	2	2016 IIB, 2017 IIA	10	3	8	11	18	1 ('16)	1 ('17)	0	2	
Ben Thilthorpe	7	1999 D, 2000 D, 2002 IIA, 2004 IIA, 2005 IIA, 2006 IIB, 2011 IIA	32	9	11	20	51	1 ('11)	1 ('05)	4 ('99, '00, '04, '06)	6	
Luke Thilthorpe	5	2002 IIA, 2004 IIA, 2005 IIA, 2006 IIB, 2011 IIA	24	9	8	17	15	1 ('11)	1 ('05)	2 ('04, '06)	4	
Brett Thomas	3	2007 IIB, 2008 IIB, 2011 IIA	13	0	0	0	28	2 ('08, '11)	1 ('07)	0	3	
Sean Thompson	1	1998 D	4	0	0	0	2	0	1 ('98)	0	1	
Cameron Todd	5	2013 IIA, 2014 IIA, 2015 IIA, 2016 IIB, 2017 IIA	25	15	22	37	14	1 ('16)	1 ('17)	0	2	
Tonkin	2	1990 D, 1992 C	4	2	1	3	0	0	1 ('90)	1 ('92)	2	
Jarkko Turtianen	5	2000 D, 2001 IIA, 2002 IIA, 2003 IIA, 2005 IIA	19	9	5	14	10	0	1 ('05)	2 ('00, '01)	3	
David Upton	2	2009 IA, 2011 IIA	9	4	1	5	4	1 ('11)	0	0	1	
Peter Valicicky	1	1974 C						0	0	0	0	
Brad Vigon	1	2008 IIB	5	1	1	2	0	1 ('08)	0	0	1	
Mitchell Villani	2	2009 IA, 2010 IIA	10	1	4	5	8	0	1 ('10)	0	1	
Adrian von Einem	1	1992 C						0	0	('92)	1	
Nathan Walker	2	2011 IIA, 2012 IB	9	6	2	8	8	1 ('11)	0	0	1	
Trevor Walsh	3	2004 IIA, 2005 IIA, 2006 IIB	15	11	15	26	93	0	1 ('05)	2 ('04, '06)	3	
Murray Wand	14	1992 C, 1993 C, 1994 C, 1995 C, 1996 D, 1997 D, 1998 D, 1999 D, 2000 D, 2001 IIA, 2003 IIA, 2006 IIB, 2007 IIB, 2008 IIB	61	49	30	79	122	1 ('01)	2 ('98, '07)	5 ('92, '99, '00, '01, '06)	8	
Andrew Watts	1	1990 D	4	0	0	0	0	0	1 ('90)	0	1	
Harvey Webb	1	1999 D	4	1	2	3	0	0	0	1 ('99)	1	
Kieren Webster	1	2017 IIA	5	0	0	0	0	0	1 ('17)	0	1	
Lliam Webster	14	2004 IIA, 2005 IIA, 2006 IIB, 2007 IIB, 2008 IIB, 2009 IA, 2010 IIA, 2011 IIA, 2012 IB, 2013 IIA, 2014 IIA, 2015 IIA, 2016 IIB, 2017 IIA	68	34	43	77	132	3 ('08, '11, '16)	4 ('05, '07, '10, '17)	2 ('04, '06)	9	Team Captain (2013, 2015, 2016, 2017)
Matthew Wegener	1	2002 IIA	5	0	0	0	4	0	0	0	0	
Ken Wellman	1	1962 B						0	0	0	0	
Andrew White	9	2003 IIA, 2004 IIA, 2005 IIA, 2006 IIB, 2007 IIB, 2008 IIB, 2009 IA, 2011 IIA, 2012 IB	43	6	19	25	164	2 ('08, '11)	2 ('05, '07)	2 ('04, '06)	6	
Anthony Wilson	14	1995 C, 1996 D, 1997 D, 1998 D, 1999 D, 2000 D, 2002 IIA, 2003 IIA, 2004 IIA, 2005 IIA, 2006 IIB, 2007 IIB, 2008 IIB, 2010 IIA	68	11	27	38	80	1 ('08)	4 ('98, '05, '07, '10)	4 ('99, '00, '04, '06)	9	Team Captain (2007, 2008); Best Defenseman (2010 IIA)
Samuel Wilson	1	2013 IIA	5	0	1	1	2	0	0	0	0	
Matthew Windle	3	1999 D, 2000 D, 2001 IIA	13	3	6	9	30	0	0	3 ('99, '00, '01)	3	
Brent Windlinger	1	1989 C	7	0	1	1	4	0	0	0	0	
Chris Wong	1	2017 IIA	5	1	0	1	4	0	1 ('17)	0	1	
Jamie Woodman	1	2017 IIA	5	1	1	2	12	0	1 ('17)	0	1	
Bradley Young	1	2009 IA	5	0	0	0	12	0	0	0	0	
