= Michael Gough (disambiguation) =

Michael Gough was an English actor.

Michael Gough may also refer to:

- Michael Gough (archaeologist) (1916–1973), British archaeologist
- Michael Gough (cricketer) (born 1979), English cricketer and umpire
- Michael Gough (voice actor) (born 1956), American voice actor
- Michael Gough, Men's World Ice Hockey Championship player

== See also ==
- Michael Goff (disambiguation)
