= Spain men's national ice hockey team =

Spain
- Association: Federación Española de Deportes de Hielo
- General manager: Maurizio Mansi
- Head coach: Luciano Basile
- Assistants: Miguel Baldris
- Captain: Alejandro Carbonell
- Most games: Salavador Balnola (88)
- Top scorer: Iñaki Salegui (53)
- Most points: Iñaki Salegui (88)
- Team colors
- IIHF code: ESP

Ranking
- Current IIHF: 27 (3 June 2026)
- Highest IIHF: 27 (2025)
- Lowest IIHF: 37 (2005–06)

First international
- Spain 6–4 Belgium (Luchon, France; 21 December 1923)

Biggest win
- Spain 38–0 Turkey (Johannesburg, South Africa; 27 March 1992)

Biggest defeat
- Netherlands 19–0 Spain (Las Palmas, Spain; 13 March 1978)

IIHF World Championships
- Appearances: 36 (first in 1977)
- Best result: 22nd (1977)

International record (W–L–T)
- 105–150–13

The Spanish men's national ice hockey team (Spanish: Selección de hockey sobre hielo de España) is the national men's ice hockey team of Spain. The team is administered by the Spanish Ice Sports Federation, itself a member of the International Ice Hockey Federation (IIHF). As of April 2020, the Spanish men's national program is 31st on the IIHF World Rankings and has 135 registered players. The men's national team currently competes at the IIHF World Championship Division II, Group A level.

== History ==
On 10 March 1923, Spain joined the IIHF after the Spanish Winter Sports Federation was founded in the same year. After building an artificial rink in Madrid, Spain, they entered their first international tournament in late 1923. Spain won their first international game against Belgium in the Challenge de Haute–Garonne tournament held in Bagnères-de-Luchon, France. They lost their next game in the tournament to France.

In 1924, Spain competed in the Ice Hockey European Championships held in Milan, Italy. During their first game against Switzerland, two of Spain's seven players were injured. Due to this, Switzerland agreed to play with only five players allowing the game to continue. Switzerland ended up winning 12–0. Spain was forced to forfeit their second game against Sweden due to the injuries suffered by their players. Sweden had also agreed to play with five players.

After the European Championships, Spain entered the Coupe de Davos in Davos, Switzerland. Days before the tournament, Spain had upset Switzerland 4–0. The tournament had 12 teams broken into four groups with Spain being placed in group two along with Switzerland and Germany. Spain lost to Switzerland, 6–0 and to Germany, 7–0. Spain also lost to Germany's second team, 2–0 but avoided being in last place by beating Italy, 4–0. On 1 January 1925, Spain played Germany's second team again, winning in double overtime 3–1. After beating Germany, Spain went on a Swiss tour winning three of the games they played. Spain played in the Challenge de Haute–Garonne for the second time in January 1925. During the tournament, they defeated Belgium's second team 4–1 and tied France 3–3.

In 1926, Spain again competed in the European Championships held in Davos, Switzerland. In their first game against Belgium, Spain lost 5–0. They also lost their second game to Czechoslovakia (9–2). In the consolation pool, Spain tied Italy 2–2 and lost to Poland, 4–1.

Spain has competed in the IIHF World Championship Division II since it began in 2001. During the first year of the tournament in 2001, Spain defeated South Africa, Iceland, Australia and New Zealand. However they lost to South Korea preventing Spain from finishing in first. In 2002, Spain finished in third place in Group B after defeating Bulgaria, Iceland and Luxembourg and losing to Yugoslavia and Lithuania. During the 2003 version of the tournament, Spain defeated South Africa, Mexico and Australia and lost to Yugoslavia and South Korea. Spain finished in third place in Group A. Spain hosted the Division II tournament in 2004 and finished fourth place in Group A by defeating Israel and Luxembourg. Spain lost to China, Croatia and Australia. 2005 was a down year for Spain as they finished in fifth place in Group B with only two points. Spain's only win came against Iceland while they lost to Serbia and Montenegro, Belgium, Israel and North Korea.

In 2006, they lost to Serbia and Montenegro, Romania men's national ice hockey team and twice to Bulgaria while beating South Africa for their lone win. They finished in fifth place in Group A for the second straight year. In 2007 they defeated Bulgaria, Turkey and Serbia and lost to Belgium and Croatia. Unlike the prior two years Spain finished in third place with nine points. In 2008, Spain finished in third place by defeating Australia, Iceland and Mexico and lost to China and New Zealand. Spain won three games and lost two in 2009, their three wins came against Mexico, Bulgaria and South Africa while they lost to South Korea and Belgium. Spain finished in third place with nine points.

Spain was ranked 34th in the IIHF World Rankings in 2009. In 2010, Spain rose in the rankings to 30th and competed in Division II of the 2010 IIHF World Championship. They finished first in their group at the tournament and hence got promoted to Division I for the first time in their history.

== Honours ==
- IIHF World Championship Division II
  - Winners: 2010, 2014 (B), 2018 (B), 2023 (A)

== World Championship record ==
| Year | Division | | Position | | GP | W | D | L |
| Year | Tier | Div. | Ov | Div. | GP | W | D | L |
|---|---|---|---|---|---|---|---|---|
| 1977 | 3 | Pool C | 22nd | 5th | 6 | 1 | 0 | 5 |
| 1978 | 3 | Pool C | 23rd | 7th | 7 | 1 | 0 | 6 |
| 1979 | 3 | Group C | 24th | 6th | 7 | 2 | 0 | 5 |
| 1981 | did not participate | | | | | | | |
| 1982 | 3 | Group C | 23rd | 7th | 7 | 1 | 0 | 6 |
| 1983 | 3 | Group C | 23rd | 7th | 7 | 1 | 1 | 5 |
| 1985 | 3 | Group C | 24th | 8th | 7 | 0 | 0 | 7 |
| 1986 | 3 | Group C | 24th | 8th | 6 | 2 | 0 | 4 |
| 1987 | did not participate | | | | | | | |
| 1989 | 4 | Group D | 28th | 4th | 4 | 1 | 0 | 3 |
| 1990 | 4 | Group D | 28th | 4th | 4 | 0 | 2 | 2 |
| 1991 | did not participate | | | | | | | |
| 1992 | 4 | Group C2 | 27th | 1st | 5 | 5 | 0 | 0 |
| 1993 | 3 | Group C | 29th | 5th | 5 | 1 | 0 | 4 |
| 1994 | 4 | Group C2 | 29th | 2nd | 5 | 3 | 1 | 1 |
| 1995 | 4 | Group C2 | 32nd | 3rd | 5 | 4 | 0 | 1 |
| 1996 | 4 | Group D | 31st | 3rd | 5 | 2 | 1 | 2 |
| 1997 | 4 | Group D | 31st | 3rd | 5 | 2 | 0 | 3 |
| 1998 | 3 | Group C | 32nd | 8th | 5 | 0 | 2 | 3 |
| 1999 | 4 | Group D | 33rd | 1st | 4 | 3 | 1 | 0 |
| 2000 | 3 | Group C | 31st | 7th | 4 | 1 | 1 | 2 |
| 2001 | 3 | Div II | 31st | 2nd | 5 | 4 | 1 | 0 |
| 2002 | 3 | Div II | 33rd | 3rd | 5 | 3 | 0 | 2 |
| 2003 | 3 | Div II | 33rd | 3rd | 5 | 3 | 2 | 0 |
| 2004 | 3 | Div II | 35th | 4th | 5 | 2 | 1 | 2 |
| 2005 | 3 | Div II | 37th | 5th | 5 | 1 | 0 | 4 |
| 2006 | 3 | Div II | 37th | 5th | 5 | 1 | 0 | 4 |
| 2007 | 3 | Div II | 34th | 3rd | 5 | 3 | 0 | 2 |
| 2008 | 3 | Div II | 34th | 3rd | 5 | 3 | 0 | 2 |
| 2009 | 3 | Div II | 33rd | 3rd | 5 | 3 | 0 | 2 |
| 2010 | 3 | Div II | 30th | 1st | 5 | 5 | 0 | 0 |
| 2011 | 2 | Div I | 26th | 5th | 4 | 1 | 0 | 3 |
| 2012 | 4 | Div II A | 30th | 2nd | 5 | 4 | 0 | 1 |
| 2013 | 4 | Div II A | 34th | 6th | 5 | 0 | 0 | 5 |
| 2014 | 5 | Div II B | 35th | 1st | 5 | 5 | 0 | 0 |
| 2015 | 4 | Div II A | 32nd | 4th | 5 | 2 | 0 | 3 |
| 2016 | 4 | Div II A | 30th | 2nd | 5 | 4 | 1 | 0 |
| 2017 | 4 | Div II A | 34th | 6th | 5 | 1 | 0 | 4 |
| 2018 | 5 | Div II B | 35th | 1st | 5 | 5 | 0 | 0 |
| 2019 | 4 | Div II A | 32nd | 4th | 5 | 2 | 0 | 3 |
| 2020 | 4 | Div II A | Cancelled due to the COVID-19 pandemic | | | | | |
| 2021 | 4 | Div II A | Cancelled due to the COVID-19 pandemic | | | | | |
| 2022 | 4 | Div II A | 30th | 4th | 4 | 1 | 0 | 3 |
| 2023 | 4 | Div II A | 29th | 1st | 5 | 5 | 0 | 0 |
| 2024 | 3 | Div I B | 27th | 5th | 5 | 1 | 0 | 4 |
| 2025 | 3 | Div I B | 27th | 5th | 5 | 0 | 2 | 3 |
| 2026 | 3 | Div I B | 27th | 5th | 5 | 1 | 0 | 4 |

== All-time record ==
Correct as of 7 November 2025. Overtime and game winning shot victories and losses are counted towards wins and losses. Teams in italics are defunct.

| Opponent | Played | Won | Drawn | Lost | GF | GA | GD |
|---|---|---|---|---|---|---|---|
| Australia | 18 | 10 | 3 | 5 | 78 | 51 | +27 |
| Austria | 1 | 0 | 0 | 1 | 4 | 14 | –14 |
| Belgium | 18 | 7 | 0 | 11 | 75 | 67 | +8 |
| Bulgaria | 15 | 6 | 1 | 8 | 63 | 74 | –11 |
| China | 13 | 4 | 0 | 9 | 40 | 66 | –26 |
| Chinese Taipei | 1 | 1 | 0 | 0 | 11 | 0 | +11 |
| Croatia | 14 | 4 | 1 | 9 | 38 | 52 | –14 |
| Czechoslovakia | 1 | 0 | 0 | 1 | 2 | 9 | –7 |
| Denmark | 6 | 0 | 0 | 6 | 8 | 42 | –34 |
| England | 2 | 1 | 1 | 0 | 14 | 10 | +4 |
| Estonia | 7 | 1 | 0 | 6 | 15 | 44 | –29 |
| France | 8 | 0 | 0 | 8 | 15 | 70 | –55 |
| Georgia | 2 | 2 | 0 | 0 | 7 | 1 | +6 |
| Great Britain | 5 | 1 | 0 | 4 | 17 | 46 | –29 |
| Greece | 3 | 3 | 0 | 0 | 37 | 2 | +35 |
| Hungary | 9 | 0 | 0 | 9 | 22 | 82 | –60 |
| Iceland | 11 | 9 | 0 | 2 | 64 | 27 | +37 |
| Italy | 4 | 0 | 1 | 3 | 3 | 26 | –23 |
| Israel | 9 | 7 | 1 | 1 | 76 | 17 | +59 |
| Japan | 2 | 0 | 0 | 2 | 5 | 17 | –12 |
| Kazakhstan | 2 | 0 | 0 | 2 | 0 | 31 | –31 |
| Lithuania | 6 | 0 | 0 | 6 | 6 | 36 | –30 |
| Luxembourg | 4 | 4 | 0 | 0 | 67 | 1 | +66 |
| Mexico | 8 | 7 | 0 | 1 | 62 | 17 | +45 |
| Netherlands | 10 | 3 | 0 | 7 | 22 | 65 | –43 |
| North Korea | 5 | 3 | 0 | 2 | 32 | 20 | +12 |
| Norway | 1 | 0 | 0 | 1 | 3 | 18 | –15 |
| New Zealand | 7 | 7 | 0 | 0 | 89 | 12 | +77 |
| Poland | 2 | 0 | 0 | 2 | 1 | 9 | –8 |
| Romania | 10 | 0 | 0 | 10 | 12 | 86 | –74 |
| Scotland | 2 | 0 | 0 | 2 | 7 | 9 | –2 |
| Serbia | 9 | 5 | 0 | 4 | 37 | 33 | +4 |
| Serbia and Montenegro | 8 | 1 | 2 | 5 | 15 | 37 | –22 |
| Slovenia | 1 | 0 | 0 | 1 | 0 | 12 | –12 |
| South Africa | 7 | 7 | 0 | 0 | 67 | 10 | +57 |
| South Korea | 15 | 4 | 3 | 8 | 55 | 63 | –8 |
| Sweden | 1 | 0 | 0 | 1 | 0 | 5 | –5 |
| Switzerland | 1 | 0 | 0 | 1 | 0 | 12 | –12 |
| Thailand | 1 | 1 | 0 | 0 | 15 | 2 | +13 |
| Turkey | 5 | 5 | 0 | 0 | 79 | 4 | +75 |
| Ukraine | 2 | 0 | 0 | 2 | 1 | 13 | –12 |
| Yugoslavia | 3 | 0 | 0 | 3 | 2 | 29 | –27 |
| Total | 259 | 103 | 13 | 143 | 1 166 | 1 241 | –75 |
