= Bulgaria men's national ice hockey team =

Bulgaria
- Association: Bulgarian Ice Hockey Federation
- Head coach: Ivaylo Velev
- Assistants: Kirll Hodulov; Svetlin Stoev
- Captain: Ivan Hodulov
- Most games: Stoyan Batchvarov (96)
- Top scorer: Alexei Yotov (77)
- Most points: Alexei Yotov (163)
- Team colors
- IIHF code: BUL

Ranking
- Current IIHF: 33 (▼1) (3 June 2026)
- Highest IIHF: 30 (2003, 2006)
- Lowest IIHF: 40 (2017, 2021–21)

First international
- Bulgaria 4–2 Yugoslavia (Bucharest, Romania] 17 January 1942)

Biggest win
- Bulgaria 20–0 Turkey (Pretoria, South Africa; 28 March 1998)

Biggest defeat
- Kazakhstan 31–0 Bulgaria (Poprad, Slovakia; 25 March 1994); Ukraine 31–0 Bulgaria (Spišská Nová Ves, Slovakia; 26 March 1994)

Olympics
- Appearances: 1 (first in 1976)

IIHF World Championships
- Appearances: 54 (first in 1963)
- Best result: 14th (1970)

International record (W–L–T)
- 149–268–24

The Bulgarian national ice hockey team (Bulgarian: Национален отбор по хокей на лед на България, Natsionalen otbor po khokeĭ na led na Bŭlgariya) is the national men's ice hockey team of Bulgaria. The team is controlled by the Bulgarian Ice Hockey Federation and a member of the International Ice Hockey Federation (IIHF). As of 2018, Bulgaria is ranked 38th in the IIHF World Ranking and competes in Division III of the Ice Hockey World Championships.

The team has participated once at the Olympic Winter Games. This happened in Innsbruck in 1976, when Bulgaria fell to the Czechoslovak team 14–1 in the first round. After a few more losses the team finished last in the tournament.

Sofia, the capital of Bulgaria, hosted the games of Division II, Group B of the 2009 Men's Ice Hockey World Championships. Bulgaria's opponents at the tournament were Belgium, Mexico, Spain, South Africa and South Korea. In 2011, Bulgaria was also in Division II, with Croatia, Romania, China, Ireland and Iceland.

Historically, the team has played in the second highest level four times, with their highest placement being 14th in 1970. However, the only year that they ever earned promotion (by placing 1st or 2nd in Pool C) was in 1975, which also qualified them for the 1976 Olympics. The only year that they won any games in Pool B was 1992 (at that time it was contested between nations ranked 13th to 20th), defeating Japan, China and Yugoslavia.

Goaltender Konstantin Mihailov played in 28 Ice Hockey World Championships with Bulgaria, and was inducted into the IIHF Hall of Fame in 2019, as a recipient of the Torriani Award to recognize his international hockey career.

== World Championship record ==
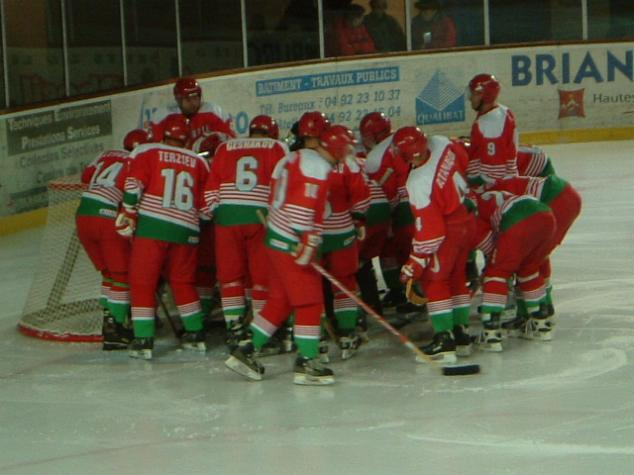
The Bulgarian national team during a qualification match for the 2006 Winter Olympics in 2004.

Year	City	Country	Result
1963	Stockholm	Sweden	4th place in Group C (19th)
1967	Vienna	Austria	3rd in Group C (19th)
1969	Skopje	Yugoslavia	5th place in Group C (19th)
1970	Bucharest	Romania	8th place in Group B (14th)
1971	Several cities	the Netherlands	5th place in Group C (19th)
1972	Miercurea Ciuc	Romania	4th place in Group C (17th)
1973	six cities	the Netherlands	4th place in Group C (18th)
1974	Grenoble, Gap, Lyon	France	3rd in Group C (17th)
1975	Sofia	Bulgaria	2nd in Group C (16th)
1976	Aarau and Biel/Bienne	Switzerland	8th place in Group B (16th)
1977	Copenhagen and Hørsholm	Denmark	3rd in Group C (20th)
1978	Las Palmas	Spain	5th place in Group C (21st)
1979	Barcelona	Spain	4th place in Group C (22nd)
1981	Beijing	China	6th place in Group C (22nd)
1982	Jaca	Spain	6th place in Group C (22nd)
1983	Budapest	Hungary	6th place in Group C (22nd)
1985	Megève, Chamonix, Saint-Gervais	France	6th place in Group C (22nd)
1986	Puigcerdà	Spain	3rd in Group C (19th)
1987	Copenhagen, Herlev, Hørsholm	Denmark	7th place in Group C (23rd)
1989	Sydney	Australia	5th place in Group C (21st)
1990	Budapest	Hungary	6th place in Group C (22nd)
1991	Brøndby Municipality	Denmark	4th place in Group C (20th)
1992	Klagenfurt	Austria	5th place in Group B (17th)
1993	Eindhoven	the Netherlands	8th place in Group B (20th)
1994	Poprad and Spišská Nová Ves	Slovakia	7th place in Group C1 (27th)
1995	Sofia	Bulgaria	9th place in Group C1 (29th)
1996	Kaunas and Elektrėnai	Lithuania	6th place in Group D (34th)
1997	Canillo	Andorra	7th place in Group D (35th)
1998	Krugersdorp and Pretoria	South Africa	1st in Group D (33rd)
1999	Eindhoven Tilburg	South Africa	8th place in Group C (32nd)
2000	Beijing	China	9th place in Group C (33rd)
2001	Bucharest	Romania	4th in Division II Group B (35th)
2002	Novi Sad	Yugoslavia	4th in Division II Group B (35th)
2003	Sofia	Bulgaria	3rd in Division II Group B (34th)
2004	Elektrėnai	Lithuania	4th in Division II Group B (36th)
2005	Zagreb	Croatia	4th in Division II Group A (35th)
2006	Sofia	Bulgaria	2nd in Division II Group A (32nd)
2007	Zagreb	Croatia	5th in Division II Group A (38th)
2008	Miercurea Ciuc	Romania	5th in Division II Group A (38th)
2009	Sofia	Bulgaria	4th in Division II Group B (36th)
2010	Naucalpan	Mexico	4th in Division II Group A (35th)
2011	Zagreb	Croatia	5th in Division II Group B (38th)
2012	Sofia	Bulgaria	3rd in Division II Group B (37th)
2013	İzmit	Turkey	6th in Division II Group B (40th)
2014	Luxembourg	Luxembourg	1st in Division III (41st)
2015	Cape Town	South Africa	4th in Division II Group B (38th)
2016	Mexico City	Mexico	6th in Division II Group B (40th)
2017	Sofia	Bulgaria	2nd in Division III (42nd)
2018	Cape Town	South Africa	2nd in Division III (42nd)
2019	Sofia	Bulgaria	1st in Division III (41st)
2020	Reykjavík	Iceland	Cancelled due to the COVID-19 pandemic
2021	Reykjavík	Iceland	Cancelled due to the COVID-19 pandemic
2022	Reykjavík	Iceland	4th in Division II Group B (35th)
2023	Istanbul	Turkey	3rd in Division II Group B (37th)
2024	Sofia	Bulgaria	4th in Division II Group B (38th)
2025	Dunedin	New Zealand	4th in Division II Group B (38th)
2026	Sofia	Bulgaria	4th in Division II Group B (38th)

== All-time record ==
As of 12 April 2026.

Opponent	Played	Won	Drawn	Lost	GF	GA	GD
Australia	11	6	2	3	60	57	+3
Austria	10	1	1	8	18	58	-40
Belgium	22	11	1	10	124	101	+23
Belarus	1	0	0	1	1	13	-12
Bosnia and Herzegovina	1	1	0	0	5	0	+5
China	22	5	2	15	69	114	-45
Chinese Taipei	6	5	0	1	35	16	+19
Croatia	7	1	0	6	16	72	-56
Czechoslovakia	1	0	0	1	1	14	−13
Denmark	32	11	2	19	88	137	-49
Estonia	3	0	0	3	1	58	-57
East Germany	4	0	0	4	13	39	-26
France	29	9	2	18	89	156	-67
Georgia	7	3	0	4	51	35	+16
Great Britain	8	6	1	1	47	36	+11
Germany	1	0	0	1	1	13	-12
Hong Kong	3	3	0	0	26	4	+22
Hungary	47	10	1	36	147	253	-106
Iceland	8	3	0	5	27	40	-13
Ireland	2	2	0	0	13	4	+9
Israel	12	3	2	7	38	54	-16
Italy	10	1	0	9	22	55	-33
Japan	11	3	0	8	29	66	-37
Kazakhstan	2	0	0	2	1	39	-38
Kyrgyzstan	1	0	0	1	3	5	-2
Lithuania	3	0	0	3	3	26	-23
Luxembourg	4	3	0	1	36	17	+19
Mexico	11	6	0	5	61	57	+4
Netherlands	17	3	1	13	51	110	-59
New Zealand	10	5	0	5	60	57	+3
North Korea	16	10	1	5	76	43	-33
Norway	5	0	1	4	11	31	-20
Poland	2	0	0	2	2	27	-25
Romania	40	4	2	34	91	249	-158
Serbia	3	0	0	3	3	25	-22
Serbia and Montenegro	11	2	2	7	31	54	-23
Slovakia	1	0	0	1	0	20	-20
Slovenia	2	0	0	2	1	27	-26
South Africa	8	7	0	1	54	14	+40
South Korea	9	5	0	4	53	48	+5
Spain	15	8	1	6	74	63	+11
Switzerland	5	0	0	5	9	32	-23
Thailand	1	1	0	0	5	3	+2
Turkey	11	9	0	2	81	26	+55
Turkmenistan	1	1	0	0	6	2	+4
United Arab Emirates	2	1	0	1	13	12	+1
Ukraine	2	0	0	2	0	48	-48
United States	1	0	0	1	1	19	−18
Yugoslavia	21	5	2	14	67	121	-54
Total	441	149	24	268	1 642	2 437	-795
