= Michael Goff (disambiguation) =

Michael Goff is a publisher and entrepreneur.

Michael Goff is also the name of:

- Mike Goff (baseball) (born 1962), baseball coach
- Mike Goff (American football) (born 1976), American football guard

== See also ==
- Michael Gough (disambiguation)
