= 2006 IIHF World Championship Division II =

Tournament details
- Host countries: Bulgaria; New Zealand
- Venue(s): 2 (in 2 host cities)
- Dates: March 27 – April 9
- Teams: 12 (two groups of 6)

The 2006 IIHF World Championship Division II was an international Ice hockey tournament run by the International Ice Hockey Federation. The tournament was contested from March 27 to April 9, 2006. Participants in this tournament were separated into two separate tournament groups. The Group A tournament was contested in Sofia, Bulgaria. Group B's games were played in Auckland, New Zealand. Romania and China finished atop of Group A and Group B respectively, gaining promotion to Division I for 2007. While South Africa finished last in Group A and hosts New Zealand last in Group B and were relegated to Division III for 2007.

== Participants ==
=== Group A ===
| Team | Qualification |
|---|---|
| Romania | Placed 6th in Division I-Group B and were relegated in 2005. |
| Serbia and Montenegro | Placed 2nd in Division II-Group B in 2005. |
| Belgium | Placed 4th in Division II-Group B in 2005. |
| Bulgaria | Host, placed 4th in Division II-Group A in 2005. |
| Spain | Placed 5th in Division II-Group B in 2005. |
| South Africa | Placed 2nd in Division III and were promoted in 2005. |

=== Group B ===
| Team | Qualification |
|---|---|
| China | Placed 6th in Division I-Group A and were relegated in 2005. |
| Australia | Placed 2nd in Division II-Group A in 2005. |
| South Korea | Placed 3rd in Division II-Group A in 2005. |
| North Korea | Placed 3rd in Division II-Group B in 2005. |
| New Zealand | Host, Placed 5th in Division II-Group A in 2005. |
| Mexico | Placed 1st in Division III and were promoted in 2005. |

== Group A tournament ==
=== Fixtures ===
All times local.

| March 27, 2006; 12:00 | Romania | 4–2 (2–0, 2–0, 0–2) | Belgium | Winter Sports Palace; Attendance: 60 |

Game reference

Andrian Catrinoi
Goalies
Bjorn Stejlen
Referee:
(France) Frederic Bachelet

| 0:38 – Basilidesz (Nagy) | 1 – 0 |
| 11:36 – Goga (Geru, Laczko) | 2 – 0 |
| 27:30 – Timaru (Basilidesz, Nicolescu) (PP1) | 3 – 0 |
| 31:57 – Peter (Moldovan, Elekes) (PP1) | 4 – 0 |
| | 4 – 1 | 45:28 – Van Buren (PP1) |
| | 4 – 2 | 57:53 – Szarzinsky (de Herdt, Vos) |

24 min
Penalties
28 min
30
Shots
25

| March 27, 2006; 15:30 | Serbia and Montenegro | 4–1 (1–1, 2–0, 1–0) | Spain | Winter Sports Palace; Attendance: 93 |

Game reference

Tihomir Zecevic
Goalies
Jose Luis Alonso
Referee:
(Denmark) Asger Krog

| | 0 – 1 | 12:33 – Armino (Brabo) |
| 16:22 – Tumbas (Juloski) | 1 – 1 |
| 28:13 – Prokic (Gabric) | 2 – 1 |
| 35:12 – Prokic (Radovic) (SH1) | 3 – 1 |
| 59:59 – Gabric (Prokic, Prokic) | 4 – 1 |

40 min
Penalties
20 min
21
Shots
12

| March 27, 2006; 19:00 | Bulgaria | 14–1 (5–0, 3–1, 6–0) | South Africa | Winter Sports Palace; Attendance: 873 |

Game reference

Konstantin Mihaylov
Goalies
David Berger
Gary Bock
Referee:
(Austria) Reinhard Kowalczyk

| 1:24 – Stoumbov (Bachvarov) (PP1) | 1 – 0 |
| 4:33 – Velev (Veselinov) (PP2) | 2 – 0 |
| 12:18 – Radkov (Polizoev) (SH1) | 3 – 0 |
| 12:51 – Bachvarov (Alexandrov) | 4 – 0 |
| 17:53 – Vasilev (Velev) (PP1) | 5 – 0 |
| 21:56 – Bachvarov (Alexandrov) | 6 – 0 |
| 25:36 – Simeonov (Veselinov) | 7 – 0 |
| | 7 – 1 | 28:40 – Booysen (Joyce) (PP1) |
| 37:23 – Radkov (Morgunov) | 8 – 1 |
| 42:00 – Morgunov (Milanov, Radkov) (PP1) | 9 – 1 |
| 46:34 – Simeonov (Milanov) (PP1) | 10 – 1 |
| 46:56 – Zinoviev (Bachvarov, Blagoev) | 11 – 1 |
| 48:01 – Simeonov (Milanov, Velev) | 12 – 1 |
| 55:57 – Petrov (PP1) | 13 – 1 |
| 59:41 – Radkov (Simeonov) | 14 – 1 |

36 min
Penalties
30 min
37
Shots
14

| March 28, 2006; 12:00 | Belgium | 2–2 (0–0, 1–0, 1–2) | Serbia and Montenegro | Winter Sports Palace; Attendance: 87 |

Game reference

Bjorn Stejlen
Goalies
Tihomir Zecevic
Referee:
(Austria) Reinhard Kowalczyk

| 25:57 – Szarzinsky (Vos) (PP1) | 1 – 0 |
| | 1 – 1 | 46:21 – Gabric (Jerkovic) (PP1) |
| | 1 – 2 | 48:32 – Gabric (Trifunovic) (PP1) |
| 53:39 – de Herdt (Lootens, Vos) | 2 – 2 |

38 min
Penalties
22 min
20
Shots
32

| March 28, 2006; 15:30 | South Africa | 3–19 (0–5, 0–6, 3–8) | Romania | Winter Sports Palace; Attendance: 79 |

Game reference

David Berger
Goalies
Viorel Radu
Referee:
(Netherlands) Ruud Vanbaast

| | 0 – 1 | 2:00 – Georgescu (Geru, Andrei) |
| | 0 – 2 | 6:01 – Geru (Andrei, Georgescu) |
| | 0 – 3 | 11:56 – Peter (Moldovan, Elekes) |
| | 0 – 4 | 15:36 – Moldovan (Elekes, Andrei) |
| | 0 – 5 | 19:27 – Andrei (Stoiculescu, Geru) (PP1) |
| | 0 – 6 | 20:36 – Timaru (Nicolescu) |
| | 0 – 7 | 23:39 – Vargyas (Nagy, Goga) |
| | 0 – 8 | 28:56 – Geru (Elekes, Peter) |
| | 0 – 9 | 32:33 – Nicolescu (Timaru) (PP2) |
| | 0 – 10 | 35:15 – Geru (Andrei) |
| | 0 – 11 | 36:08 – Goga (Vargyas, Nicolescu) |
| | 0 – 12 | 43:28 – Vargyas (Timaru, Nagy) (PP1) |
| | 0 – 13 | 43:51 – Timaru (Nicolescu, Vargyas) |
| 44:07 – Saffy (Booysen) | 1 – 13 |
| 46:03 – Kemp (Mngoma, Eeckhoven) | 2 – 13 |
| | 2 – 14 | 46:17 – Geru (Andrei, Georgescu) |
| | 2 – 15 | 47:20 – Geru (Andrei) |
| | 2 – 16 | 49:53 – Geru (Georgescu, Andrei) |
| 53:38 – Kemp (Olivier, Eeckhoven) (PP1) | 3 – 16 |
| | 3 – 17 | 54:10 – Andrei (Geru, Vargyas) |
| | 3 – 18 | 56:32 – Elekes (SH1) |
| | 3 – 19 | 57:04 – Geru (Laczko, Kostandi) |

18 min
Penalties
12 min
12
Shots
57

| March 28, 2006; 19:00 | Spain | 1–3 (0–2, 1–1, 0–0) | Bulgaria | Winter Sports Palace; Attendance: 1249 |

Game reference

Jose Luis Alonso
Goalies
Konstantin Mihaylov
Referee:
(Netherlands) Ruud Vanbaast

| | 0 – 1 | 12:42 – Simeonov (Veselinov) |
| | 0 – 2 | 15:05 – Morgunov (velev, Petrov) (PP1) |
| 27:26 – Betran (Munoz) | 1 – 2 |
| | 1 – 3 | 32:32 – Bachvarov (Milanov) (PP1) |

22 min
Penalties
36 min
30
Shots
19

| March 30, 2006; 12:00 | Romania | 16–3 (6–0, 5–0, 5–3) | Spain | Winter Sports Palace; Attendance: 54 |

Game reference

Andrian Catrinoi
Goalies
Jose Luis Alonso
Juan Gonzalez
Referee:
(Austria) Reinhard Kowalczyk

| 3:58 – Elekes | 1 – 0 |
| 7:02 – Elekes (Moldovan, Kosa) (PP1) | 2 – 0 |
| 10:42 – Nicolescu (Timaru, Basilidesz) | 3 – 0 |
| 11:45 – Elekes | 4 – 0 |
| 13:00 – Mihaly (Flinta, Balint) | 5 – 0 |
| 14:18 – Moldovan (Kosa) | 6 – 0 |
| 20:48 – Vargyas (PP1) | 7 – 0 |
| 27:07 – Moldovan (Papp) (SH1) | 8 – 0 |
| 30:01 – Geru (Goga, Vargyas) (PP1) | 9 – 0 |
| 33:50 – Kostandi (Stoiculescu, Balint) | 10 – 0 |
| 35:58 – Elekes (Vargyas) | 11 – 0 |
| 46:50 – Moldovan (SH1) | 12 – 0 |
| 52:12 – Andrei (Geru, Goga) | 13 – 0 |
| 52:50 – Geru (Goga) | 14 – 0 |
| 54:03 – Timaru (Laczko, Vargyas) (SH1) | 15 – 0 |
| 55:27 – Elekes (Vargyas) | 16 – 0 |
| | 16 – 1 | 56:25 – Stransky (Gijon, Armino) |
| | 16 – 2 | 58:43 – Gavilanes (Torres) |
| | 16 – 3 | 59:23 – Gavilanes (Salegui, Bosom) |

26 min
Penalties
24 min
36
Shots
11

| March 30, 2006; 15:30 | South Africa | 0–7 (0–3, 0–1, 0–3) | Belgium | Winter Sports Palace; Attendance: 48 |

Game reference

Gary Bock
Goalies
Bjorn Stejlen
Referee:
(Denmark) Asger Krog

| 0 – 1 | 3:16 – Morgan (Vos, Peusens) (SH1) |
| 0 – 2 | 12:12 – Nuyts (Mertens, Kustermans) (PP1) |
| 0 – 3 | 18:51 – de Herdt (SH1) |
| 0 – 4 | 30:31 – Mertens (Steijen) (SH1) |
| 0 – 5 | 41:50 – Van Buren |
| 0 – 6 | 50:29 – Morgan |
| 0 – 7 | 52:47 – Kustermans |

12 min
Penalties
20 min
10
Shots
33

| March 30, 2006; 19:00 | Serbia and Montenegro | 2–4 (0–1, 1–2, 1–1) | Bulgaria | Winter Sports Palace; Attendance: 589 |

Game reference

Tihomir Zecevic
Milan Lukovic
Goalies
Konstantin Mihaylov
Referee:
(Netherlands) Ruud Vanbaast

| | 0 – 1 | 4:49 – Alexandrov (Bachvarov, Blagoev) (PP1) |
| 23:28 – Gabric (Prokic, Prokic) | 1 – 1 |
| | 1 – 2 | 28:53 – Radkov (Stoumbov, Polizoev) (SH1) |
| | 1 – 3 | 33:46 – Morgunov (Milanov, Radkov) |
| | 1 – 4 | 46:00 – Veselinov (PP1) |
| 49:26 – Rus (Ilic, Prokic) (PP1) | 2 – 4 |

18 min
Penalties
18 min
22
Shots
23

| April 1, 2006; 12:00 | Serbia and Montenegro | 14–5 (3–1, 8–1, 3–3) | South Africa | Winter Sports Palace; Attendance: 62 |

Game reference

Milan Lukvic
Goalies
David Berger
Referee:
(France) Frederic Bachelet

| 15:38 – Radovic (Milojkovic, Petrovic) | 1 – 0 |
| 15:54 – Prokic (Gabric) | 2 – 0 |
| 17:25 – Rus (Prokic) | 3 – 0 |
| | 3 – 1 | 19:35 – Vervey (Edwards) |
| 22:20 – Radovic (PP1) | 4 – 1 |
| 28:35 – Juloski (Banovic, Bogdanovic) | 5 – 1 |
| | 5 – 2 | 30:31 – Mngoma (Booysen) |
| 31:44 – Rakovic (Radovic) | 6 – 2 |
| 32:42 – Bogdanovic (Juloski) | 7 – 2 |
| 34:08 – Gabric (Prokic, Rus) | 8 – 2 |
| 35:50 – Bogdanovic (Banovic, Ilic) (PP1) | 9 – 2 |
| 37:13 – Rus (Prokic) | 10 – 2 |
| 38:15 – Savic (Milojkovic) | 11 – 2 |
| 42:16 – Milokovic (Savic, Radovic) | 12 – 2 |
| | 12 – 3 | 46:19 – Lyon (Edwards) |
| | 12 – 4 | 47:02 – Kemp |
| 51:54 – Rakovic (Milojkovic, Prokic) | 13 – 4 |
| 53:47 – Juloski (Bogdanovic, Banovic) | 14 – 4 |
| | 14 – 5 | 57:50 – Joyce |

0 min
Penalties
10 min
52
Shots
17

| April 1, 2006; 15:30 | Belgium | 4–0 (2–0, 0–0, 2–0) | Spain | Winter Sports Palace; Attendance: 137 |

Game reference

Bjorn Stejlen
Goalies
Jose Luis Alonso
Referee:
(Netherlands) Ruud Vanbaast

| 6:37 – Kustermans (Szarzinsky, Peusens) (PP1) | 1 – 0 |
| 17:56 – Steijnen (PP1) | 2 – 0 |
| 42:57 – Steijnen (Mertens) (PP1) | 3 – 0 |
| 46:18 – Mertens (Nuyts, Steijnen) (PP1) | 4 – 0 |

24 min
Penalties
32 min
35
Shots
14

| April 1, 2006; 19:00 | Bulgaria | 0–9 (0–1, 0–1, 0–7) | Romania | Winter Sports Palace; Attendance: 1843 |

Game reference

Konstantin Mihaylov
Ivaylo Asenov
Goalies
Viorel Radu
Referee:
(Denmark) Asger Krog

| 0–1 | 12:30 – Timaru (Goga, Geru) |
| 0–2 | 37:37 – Timaru (Nicolescu) (PP1) |
| 0–3 | 42:46 – Timaru (Nicolescu, Andrei) |
| 0–4 | 43:54 – Basilidesz |
| 0–5 | 45:22 – Geru (Goga, Andrei) |
| 0–6 | 46:55 – Moldovan (Elekes, Andrei) |
| 0–7 | 47:07 – Basilidesz (Laczko, Georgescu) |
| 0–8 | 51:21 – Georgescu (Vargyas) |
| 0–9 | 52:11 – Vargyas (Stoiculescu, Timaru) (PP1) |

55 min
Penalties
18 min
10
Shots
59

| April 2, 2006; 12:00 | Spain | 5–3 (2–1, 2–0, 1–2) | South Africa | Winter Sports Palace; Attendance: 43 |

Game reference

Jose Luis Alonso
Goalies
Gary Bock
Referee:
(Denmark) Asger Krog

| 4:55 – Echevarria (Lizundia, Zapata) | 1 – 0 |
| 6:12 – Gavilanes (Brabo, Salegui) | 2 – 0 |
| | 2 – 1 | 8:12 – Edwards (SH1) |
| 32:16 – Lizundia (Stransky) (PP1) | 3 – 1 |
| 35:58 – Bosom (Codina) (PP1) | 4 – 1 |
| | 4 – 2 | 42:08 – Edwards (Vervey, Olivier) |
| | 4 – 3 | 45:07 – Vervey (Edwards, Matthews) |
| 58:17 – Munoz | 5 – 3 |

10 min
Penalties
24 min
38
Shots
13

| April 2, 2006; 15:30 | Romania | 11–1 (3–1, 3–0, 5–0) | Serbia and Montenegro | Winter Sports Palace; Attendance: 213 |

Game reference

Adrian Catrinoi
Viorel Radu
Goalies
Tihomir Zecevic
Milan Lukovic
Referee:
(Austria) Reinhard Kowalczyk

| | 0 – 1 | 1:13 – Prokic (Gabric, Rus) (PP1) |
| 6:37 – Basilidesz (Nicolescu, Timaru) | 1 – 1 |
| 11:28 – Basilidesz (Nicolescu, Timaru) | 2 – 1 |
| 13:31 – Andrei (Goga, Georgescu) (PP1) | 3 – 1 |
| 22:33 – Geru (Andrei) | 4 – 1 |
| 32:34 – Goga (Geru) | 5 – 1 |
| 36:06 – Geru (Andrei, Georgescu) (PP1) | 6 – 1 |
| 43:55 – Mihaly (Balint, Kosa) | 7 – 1 |
| 46:08 – Moldovan (Elekes, Peter) (PP1) | 8 – 1 |
| 52:42 – Geru (Andrei) | 9 – 1 |
| 53:15 – Elekes (Peter) | 10 – 1 |
| 58:14 – Andrei (Geru) | 11 – 1 |

28 min
Penalties
24 min
37
Shots
17

| April 2, 2006; 19:00 | Bulgaria | 4–4 (2–2, 1–1, 1–1) | Belgium | Winter Sports Palace; Attendance: 797 |

Game reference

Konstantin Mihaylov
Goalies
Bjorn Stejlen
Referee:
(France) Frederic Bachelet

| | 0 – 1 | 4:31 – Peusens (Vos, Szarzinsky) (PP1) |
| 7:13 – Velev (Simeonov) | 1 – 1 |
| 14:01 – Radkov (Milanov, Atanasov) (PP1) | 2 – 1 |
| | 2 – 2 | 18:42 – Nuyts (Mertens, Steijnen) (PP1) |
| | 2 – 3 | 20:17 – Peusens (Szarzinsky, Vos) (PP1) |
| 28:14 – Zinoviev (Bachvarov, Stoumbov) | 3 – 3 |
| 44:23 – Polizoev (Milanov) (PP1) | 4 – 3 |
| | 4 – 4 | 59:37 – Van Looy (de Herdt, Morgan) |

41 min
Penalties
12 min
18
Shots
44

=== Ranking and statistics ===
| Promoted to Division I for 2007 |
| Relegated to Division III for 2007 |

| Team | GP | W | T | L | GF | GA | GDF | PTS |
|---|---|---|---|---|---|---|---|---|
| Romania | 5 | 5 | 0 | 0 | 59 | 9 | 50 | 10 |
| Bulgaria | 5 | 3 | 1 | 1 | 25 | 17 | 8 | 7 |
| Belgium | 5 | 2 | 2 | 1 | 19 | 10 | 9 | 6 |
| Serbia and Montenegro | 5 | 2 | 1 | 2 | 23 | 23 | 0 | 5 |
| Spain | 5 | 1 | 0 | 4 | 10 | 30 | −20 | 2 |
| South Africa | 5 | 0 | 0 | 5 | 12 | 59 | −47 | 0 |

==== Scoring leaders ====
List shows the top skaters sorted by points, then goals. If the list exceeds 10 skaters because of a tie in points, all of the tied skaters are left out.

| Player | GP | G | A | Pts | +/− | PIM | POS |
|---|---|---|---|---|---|---|---|
| (Romania) Catalin Geru | 5 | 13 | 8 | 21 | +19 | 4 | F |
| (Romania) Nutu Andrei | 5 | 5 | 13 | 18 | +20 | 0 | F |
| (Romania) Ioan Timaru | 5 | 7 | 6 | 13 | +11 | 2 | F |
| (Romania) Levente Elekes | 5 | 7 | 6 | 13 | +8 | 4 | F |
| (Romania) Laszlo Vargyas | 5 | 4 | 8 | 12 | +17 | 0 | D |
| (Serbia and Montenegro) Ivan Prokić | 5 | 4 | 7 | 11 | +5 | 22 | F |
| (Romania) Attila Goga | 5 | 3 | 7 | 10 | +12 | 8 | D |
| (Romania) Viorel Nicolescu | 5 | 2 | 8 | 10 | +8 | 0 | F |
| (Romania) Ervin Moldovan | 5 | 6 | 3 | 9 | +9 | 0 | F |

GP = Games played; G = Goals; A = Assists; Pts = Points; +/− = Plus/minus; PIM = Penalties in minutes; POS = Position
Source: IIHF.com

==== Leading goaltenders ====
Only the top five goaltenders, based on save percentage, who have played 40% of their team's minutes are included in this list.

| Player | TOI | SA | GA | GAA | Sv% | SO |
|---|---|---|---|---|---|---|
| (Bulgaria) Konstantin Mihaylov | 280:00 | 151 | 10 | 2.14 | 93.38 | 0 |
| (Belgium) Bjorn Stejlen | 299:16 | 104 | 10 | 2.00 | 90.38 | 2 |
| (Romania) Viorel Radu | 140:00 | 28 | 3 | 1.29 | 89.29 | 2 |
| (Romania) Adrian Catrinoi | 160:00 | 47 | 6 | 2.25 | 87.23 | 0 |
| (Spain) Jose Luis Alonso | 250.42 | 92 | 17 | 4.07 | 81.52 | 0 |

TOI = Time On Ice (minutes:seconds); SA = Shots against; GA = Goals against; GAA = Goals against average; Sv% = Save percentage; SO = Shutouts
Source: IIHF.com

== Group B tournament ==
=== Fixtures ===
All times local.

| April 3, 2006; 12:00 | North Korea | 1–5 (0–3, 0–1, 1–1) | Australia | Botany; Attendance: 150 |

Game reference

Song Chol Ri
Goalies
Matthew Ezzy
Referee:
(United States) Travis Smith

| | 0 – 1 | 1:42 – Hughes (Matus) |
| | 0 – 2 | 8:02 – Sekura (PP1) |
| | 0 – 3 | 9:37 – Nelson Bond (James Keane, Brlecic) |
| | 0 – 4 | 29:06 – Nelson Bond |
| | 0 – 5 | 46:00 – Rummukainen (PP2) |
| 48:12 – Ri (Han) | 1 – 5 |

18 min
Penalties
18 min
18
Shots
46

| April 3, 2006; 15:30 | Mexico | 1–4 (0–2, 1–2, 0–0) | China | Botany; Attendance: 120 |

Game reference

Alfonso de Alba
Goalies
Yang Yu
Referee:
(Japan) Kazuhiko Kawamura

| | 0 – 1 | 1:35 – Meng (Zhang) |
| | 0 – 2 | 2:53 – Yin (Liu) |
| | 0 – 3 | 21:01 – Zhou (Yin) (PP1) |
| 33:52 – Pineyro (Cervantes) (SH1) | 1 – 3 |
| | 1 – 4 | 35:35 – Wang (Chen) (PP1) |

34 min
Penalties
40 min
34
Shots
36

| April 3, 2006; 19:00 | New Zealand | 1–8 (0–5, 1–1, 0–2) | South Korea | Botany; Attendance: 570 |

Game reference

Mike Parsons
Goalies
Ho-Seung Son
Referee:
(Czech Republic) Miroslav Jebavy

| | 0 – 1 | 0:51 – KS Kim (SH1) |
| | 0 – 2 | 2:57 – YH Kim (KS Kim) |
| | 0 – 3 | 4:11 – HS Kim (MK Kim) |
| | 0 – 4 | 6:18 – Kwak (KH Kim) |
| | 0 – 5 | 7:13 – KS Kim (Lee) |
| 20:27 – Speirs (Sam, Glass) | 1 – 5 |
| | 1 – 6 | 38:16 – MK Kim (DH Kim, KS Kim) (PP1) |
| | 1 – 7 | 42:38 – KH Kim (MK Kim) |
| | 1 – 8 | 55:33 – Lee (KS Kim) |

12 min
Penalties
16 min
11
Shots
78

| April 4, 2006; 12:00 | China | 14–2 (6–0, 4–1, 4–1) | North Korea | Botany; Attendance: 85 |

Game reference

Ming Xie
Goalies
Song Chol Ri
Kun Hyok Pak
Referee:
(Czech Republic) Miroslav Jebavy

| 4:13 – Zhang (Hou) (PP1) | 1 – 0 |
| 4:27 – Chen (Hao) | 2 – 0 |
| 11:49 – Chao du (Zhang) | 3 – 0 |
| 12:48 – Liu (Dong) | 4 – 0 |
| 13:55 – Wang (Zhang) | 5 – 0 |
| 19:59 – Dong | 6 – 0 |
| 24:09 – Zhang | 7 – 0 |
| | 7 – 1 | 26:26 – Kim (Ri) (PP2) |
| 28:19 – Wang (PP1) | 8 – 1 |
| 36:46 – Zhang (Yin, Li) (PP1) | 9 – 1 |
| 37:09 – Wang (Wang) | 10 – 1 |
| 44:56 – Su (Chao du) | 11 – 1 |
| 47:11 – Chen (Wang) | 12 – 1 |
| | 12 – 2 | 54:45 – Kim |
| 55:19 – Chao du (Wang) (PP1) | 13 – 2 |
| 59:31 – Dong (Chen, Wang) (PP1) | 14 – 2 |

22 min
Penalties
26 min
39
Shots
23

| April 4, 2006; 15:30 | South Korea | 15–2 (5–0, 7–2, 3–0) | Mexico | Botany; Attendance: 110 |

Game reference

Sung-Bae Kim
Ho-Seung Son
Goalies
Alfonso de Alba
Andres de la Garma
Referee:
(United States) Travis Smith

| 7:00 – Lee (KH Kim, HI Kim) (PP1) | 1 – 0 |
| 7:59 – DH Kim (Choi, HS Kim) | 2 – 0 |
| 13:17 – KH Kim (Jang) (SH1) | 3 – 0 |
| 14:58 – Bae (Lee, HI Kim) | 4 – 0 |
| 16:20 – Pyo (Choi, HS Kim) | 5 – 0 |
| 21:35 – Lee (KS Kim, KT Kim) | 6 – 0 |
| 25:02 – Kwak (Jang, KH Kim) (PP1) | 7 – 0 |
| 25:20 – KS Kim | 8 – 0 |
| 25:27 – KS Kim (KT Kim) | 9 – 0 |
| 32:36 – KT Kim (Lee, KS Kim) | 10 – 0 |
| 33:30 – KT Kim (KS Kim, Lee) | 11 – 0 |
| | 11 – 1 | 36:15 – Cervantes (Chabat, Ugarte) (PP1) |
| | 11 – 2 | 37:12 – de la Vega (Sierra, Meza) |
| 38:08 – KT Kim (KS Kim, HI Kim) | 12 – 2 |
| 43:48 – KS Kim (KH Kim, DY Kim) | 13 – 2 |
| 46:58 – DY Kim (KS Kim, KH Kim) | 14 – 2 |
| 53:00 – MK Kim (Choi, Pyo) | 15 – 2 |

14 min
Penalties
10 min
54
Shots
19

| April 4, 2006; 19:00 | Australia | 6–2 (1–0, 2–0, 3–2) | New Zealand | Botany; Attendance: 1200 |

Game reference

Stuart Denman
Goalies
Gareth Livingstone
Referee:
(Japan) Koji Yamada

| 13:59 – Oddy | 1 – 0 |
| 38:09 – Oddy (Lovering) | 2 – 0 |
| 39:44 – Hughes (Rummukainen, Nelson Bond) | 3 – 0 |
| | 3 – 1 | 41:15 – Lee (Smith) |
| 41:59 – Hughes (Rummukainen) | 4 – 1 |
| 47:20 – Sekura (Lovering, Thilthorpe) (PP1) | 5 – 1 |
| | 5 – 2 | 51:24 – Speirs (Glass, Sam) |
| 52:03 – Thilthorpe (Oddy) | 6 – 2 |

24 min
Penalties
22 min
74
Shots
14

| April 6, 2006; 12:00 | Australia | 2–4 (0–3, 1–0, 1–1) | South Korea | Botany; Attendance: 108 |

Game reference

Matthew Ezzy
Goalies
Ho-Seung Son
Referee:
(United States) Travis Smith

| | 0 – 1 | 2:56 – KH Kim (Kwak) |
| | 0 – 2 | 16:56 – HI Kim (Bae) |
| | 0 – 3 | 17:24 – KH Kim (Kwak) |
| 39:58 – White (Rummukainen, Webster) | 1 – 3 |
| 46:20 – Brlecic (Rubes) (PP1) | 2 – 3 |
| | 2 – 4 | 57:48 – KH Kim |

14 min
Penalties
24 min
32
Shots
39

| April 6, 2006; 15:30 | Mexico | 0–3 (0–2, 0–0, 0–1) | North Korea | Botany; Attendance: 100 |

Game reference

Alfonso de Alba
Goalies
Song Chol Ri
Referee:
(Japan) Koji Yamada

| 0 – 1 | 3:12 – SCI Ri |
| 0 – 2 | 9:43 – Song |
| 0 – 3 | 55:39 – Mun (KS Ri) |

18 min
Penalties
16 min
21
Shots
31

| April 6, 2006; 19:00 | China | 5–0 (1–0, 2–0, 2–0) | New Zealand | Botany; Attendance: 550 |

Game reference

Yang Yu
Goalies
Mike Parsons
Gareth Livingstone
Referee:
(Japan) Kazuhiko Kawamura

| 4:02 – Meng (Li) | 1 – 0 |
| 28:03 – Zhang (Yin) | 2 – 0 |
| 33:31 – Z Wang (Dong) | 3 – 0 |
| 43:13 – Chao du (D Wang) | 4 – 0 |
| 48:04 – Z Wang (Chen) | 5 – 0 |

2 min
Penalties
8 min
70
Shots
13

| April 7, 2006; 12:00 | Australia | 9–2 (2–0, 4–0, 3–2) | Mexico | Botany; Attendance: 120 |

Game reference

Stuart Denman
Goalies
Andreas de la Garma
Alfonso de Alba
Referee:
(Japan) Kazuhiko Kawamura

| 6:04 – Walsh | 1 – 0 |
| 18:08 – Wand (Rubes) | 2 – 0 |
| 26:28 – Hughes (Matus, Webster) (PP1) | 3 – 0 |
| 30:22 – Webster (Harding) | 4 – 0 |
| 32:11 – Oddy (Walsh) (SH1) | 5 – 0 |
| 38:31 – Wand (Rubes) | 6 – 0 |
| 49:45 – Sekura (Thilthorpe) | 7 – 0 |
| 53:18 – Thilthorpe (Walsh, Lovering) (PP1) | 8 – 0 |
| 54:26 – Rubes (Wand) | 9 – 0 |
| | 9 – 1 | 58:20 – Sierra (Cervantes, Pineyro) |
| | 9 – 2 | 58:43 – Cervantes |

16 min
Penalties
20 min
45
Shots
21

| April 7, 2006; 15:30 | South Korea | 3–6 (1–0, 1–4, 1–2) | China | Botany; Attendance: 250 |

Game reference

Sung-Bae Kim
Goalies
Yang Yu
Referee:
(Czech Republic) Miroslav Jebavy

| 17:32 – KS Kim (KT Kim) (SH1) | 1 – 0 |
| | 1 – 1 | 21:41 – Yin (Li, Zhou) (PP1) |
| | 1 – 2 | 24:00 – Yin (SH1) |
| 34:07 – Lee (DY Kim) | 2 – 2 |
| | 2 – 3 | 36:48 – Zhang (Zhou) |
| | 2 – 4 | 38:22 – Liu (Chen) |
| | 2 – 5 | 55:40 – Liu (Zhou) |
| | 2 – 6 | 57:50 – Chao du (D Wang) (PP1) |
| 59:45 – KS Kim (KT Kim) | 3 – 6 |

42 min
Penalties
34 min
32
Shots
34

| April 7, 2006; 19:00 | North Korea | 3–0 (0–0, 1–0, 2–0) | New Zealand | Botany; Attendance: 800 |

Game reference

Song Chol Ri
Goalies
Mike Parsons
Referee:
(Japan) Koji Yamada

| 20:51 – Kim | 1 – 0 |
| 43:34 – Ri (Ho) | 2 – 0 |
| 49:57 – Ku (Yun, Kim) | 3 – 0 |

8 min
Penalties
12 min
46
Shots
18

| April 9, 2006; 12:00 | South Korea | 5–1 (2–1, 2–0, 1–0) | North Korea | Botany; Attendance: 600 |

Game reference

Sung-Bae Kim
Goalies
Song Chol Ri
Referee:
(United States) Travis Smith

| 1:46 – Choi (Lee) | 1 – 0 |
| | 1 – 1 | 5:30 – Song (Ri) |
| 6:34 – KS Kim (Pyo, DH Kim) | 2 – 1 |
| 25:17 – KS Kim (Lee, KT Kim) | 3 – 1 |
| 29:04 – Lee (KT Kim, Kwak) | 4 – 1 |
| 58:59 – KS Kim | 5 – 1 |

4 min
Penalties
4 min
45
Shots
16

| April 9, 2006; 15:30 | China | 5–5 (2–2, 1–1, 2–2) | Australia | Botany; Attendance: 550 |

Game reference

Yang Yu
Goalies
Matthew Ezzy
Referee:
(Czech Republic) Miroslav Jebavy

| 1:49 – Dong (Chen) | 1 – 0 |
| | 1 – 1 | 4:07 – Hughes (Matus) (PP1) |
| 10:14 – Chao du (PP1) | 2 – 1 |
| | 2 – 2 | 14:49 – Wand (Rubes) (PP1) |
| | 2 – 3 | 26:07 – Oddy (White) (PP1) |
| 27:10 – Z Wang (Chen) | 3 – 3 |
| | 3 – 4 | 40:20 – Sekura (Lovering, Thilthorpe) (PP1) |
| 49:06 – Chao du (D Wang) | 4 – 4 |
| | 4 – 5 | 51:05 – Sekura |
| 57:59 – Li (Chao du) (PP1) | 5 – 5 |

34 min
Penalties
48 min
40
Shots
44

| April 9, 2006; 19:00 | New Zealand | 3–4 (0–2, 1–2, 2–0) | Mexico | Botany; Attendance: 1200 |

Game reference

Mike Parsons
Goalies
Alfonso de Alba
Referee:
(Japan) Koji Yamada

| | 0 – 1 | 13:16 – Miller (Chabat) |
| | 0 – 2 | 17:11 – Sierra (Ugarte, Chabat) (PP1) |
| | 0 – 3 | 22:07 – Cervantes (Pineyro) |
| 27:46 – Glass (Speirs, Sam) (PP1) | 1 – 3 |
| | 1 – 4 | 30:15 – Ehlers (Ortega) |
| 48:35 – Speirs | 2 – 4 |
| 58:01 – Hay | 3 – 4 |

10 min
Penalties
22 min
28
Shots
34

=== Ranking and statistics ===
| Promoted to Division I for 2007 |
| Relegated to Division III for 2007 |

| Team | GP | W | T | L | GF | GA | GDF | PTS |
|---|---|---|---|---|---|---|---|---|
| China | 5 | 4 | 1 | 0 | 34 | 11 | 23 | 9 |
| South Korea | 5 | 4 | 0 | 1 | 35 | 12 | 23 | 8 |
| Australia | 5 | 3 | 1 | 1 | 27 | 14 | 13 | 7 |
| North Korea | 5 | 2 | 0 | 3 | 10 | 24 | −14 | 4 |
| Mexico | 5 | 1 | 0 | 4 | 9 | 34 | −25 | 2 |
| New Zealand | 5 | 0 | 0 | 5 | 6 | 26 | −20 | 0 |

GP = Games played; W = Wins; T = Ties;L = Losses; GF = Goals for; GA = Goals against; GDF = Goal difference; PTS = Points

==== Scoring leaders ====
List shows the top skaters sorted by points, then goals. If the list exceeds 10 skaters because of a tie in points, all of the tied skaters are left out.

| Player | GP | G | A | Pts | +/− | PIM | POS |
|---|---|---|---|---|---|---|---|
| (South Korea) Kim Ki-sung | 5 | 10 | 8 | 18 | +16 | 4 | F |
| (South Korea) Kim Kyu-hun | 5 | 5 | 5 | 10 | +4 | 6 | F |
| (South Korea) Kim Kyung-tae | 5 | 3 | 6 | 9 | +12 | 2 | F |
| (China) Du Chao | 5 | 6 | 2 | 8 | +5 | 12 | F |
| (China) Chen Lei | 5 | 2 | 6 | 8 | +7 | 14 | F |
| (China) Wang Zhiqiang | 5 | 6 | 1 | 7 | +3 | 4 | F |
| (South Korea) Lee Yong-jun | 5 | 3 | 4 | 7 | +7 | 6 | D |
| (China) Yin Kai | 5 | 3 | 3 | 6 | +8 | 6 | D |
| (Australia) Joseph Hughes | 5 | 5 | 0 | 5 | +3 | 0 | F |
| (Australia) Chris Sekura | 5 | 5 | 0 | 5 | +2 | 2 | F |

GP = Games played; G = Goals; A = Assists; Pts = Points; +/− = Plus/minus; PIM = Penalties in minutes; POS = Position
Source: IIHF.com

==== Leading goaltenders ====
Only the top five goaltenders, based on save percentage, who have played 40% of their team's minutes are included in this list.

| Player | TOI | SA | GA | GAA | Sv% | SO |
|---|---|---|---|---|---|---|
| (China) Yu Yang | 240:00 | 123 | 9 | 2.25 | 92.68 | 1 |
| (South Korea) Son Ho-seung | 220:00 | 76 | 6 | 1.64 | 92.11 | 0 |
| (New Zealand) Mike Parsons | 220:00 | 208 | 18 | 4.91 | 91.35 | 0 |
| (Australia) Matthew Ezzy | 179:31 | 96 | 9 | 3.01 | 90.62 | 0 |
| (Australia) Stuart Denman | 120:00 | 35 | 4 | 2.00 | 88.57 | 0 |

TOI = Time On Ice (minutes:seconds); SA = Shots against; GA = Goals against; GAA = Goals against average; Sv% = Save percentage; SO = Shutouts
Source: IIHF.com
