= 2015 IIHF World Championship Division II =

Tournament details
- Host countries: Iceland; South Africa
- Venues: 2 (in 2 host cities)
- Dates: 13–19 April
- Teams: 12

The 2015 IIHF World Championship Division II was an international Ice hockey tournament run by the International Ice Hockey Federation. Group A was contested in Reykjavík, Iceland, and Group B in Cape Town, South Africa, with both groups being played 13 to 19 April 2015.

== Venues ==
Group A	Group B
Reykjavík	Cape Town
Laugardalur Arena; Capacity: 1,000	Grandwest Ice Arena; Capacity: 2,800

== Division II A ==
2015 IIHF World Championship Division II A

Tournament details
- Host country: Iceland
- Venue: 1 (in 1 host city)
- Dates: 13–19 April
- Teams: 6

Tournament statistics
- Games played: 15
- Goals scored: 111 (7.4 per game)
- Attendance: 4,958 (331 per game)
- Scoring leader: (Belgium) Mitch Morgan (10 points)

Official website
- IIHF.com

=== Participants ===
Team	Qualification
Romania	Placed 6th in Division I B and were relegated.
Iceland	Host, placed 2nd in Division II A last year.
Serbia	Placed 3rd in Division II A last year.
Australia	Placed 4th in Division II A last year.
Belgium	Placed 5th in Division II A last year.
Spain	Placed 1st in Division II B last year and were promoted.

=== Match officials ===
4 referees and 7 linesmen were selected for the tournament.

Referees

- (Norway) Roy Hansen
- (Croatia) Vedran Krčelić
- (Poland) Paweł Meszyński
- (United Kingdom) Liam Sewell

Linesmen

- (Latvia) Maksims Bogdanovs
- (France) Thomas Caillot
- (Norway) Havar Dahl
- (Iceland) Sindri Gunnarsson
- (Austria) Michael Johnstone
- (Croatia) Marko Sakovic
- (Iceland) Orri Sigmarsson

=== Standings ===
Team	Pld	W	OTW	OTL	L	GF	GA	GD	Pts	Promotion or relegation
Romania	5	4	1	0	0	27	11	+16	14	Promoted to Division I B for 2016
Belgium	5	2	1	0	2	22	15	+7	8	
Serbia	5	1	1	2	1	18	22	−4	7	
Spain	5	2	0	1	2	16	20	−4	7	
Iceland	5	2	0	1	2	17	13	+4	7	
Australia	5	0	1	0	4	11	30	−19	2	Relegated to Division II B for 2016

Source: IIHF

=== Results ===
All times are local (UTC±0).

13 April 2015; 13:00	Spain	6–1 (2–1, 1–0, 3–0)	Australia	Laugardalur Arena, Reykjavík; Attendance: 121

Game reference

Ander Alcaine
Goalies
Fraser Carson
Referee:
(Croatia) Vedran Krčelić
Linesmen:
(Austria) Michael Johnstone
(Iceland) Orri Sigmarsson

G. Betran (PP) – 05:00	1–0
	1–1	05:55 – Todd (Funes)
G. González (A. Betran, Hernández) – 18:37	2–1
A. Garcia (Carbonell) – 24:32	3–1
Puyuelo (P. González) – 46:40	4–1
Boronat (Solórzano, Vicente) – 47:25	5–1
Anglès (Barnola) – 47:52	6–1

4 min
Penalties
8 min
26
Shots
21

13 April 2015; 16:30	Serbia	4–8 (0–3, 2–3, 2–2)	Romania	Laugardalur Arena, Reykjavík; Attendance: 146

Game reference

Arsenije Ranković
Milan Luković
Goalies
Adrian Catrinoi
Referee:
(United Kingdom) Liam Sewell
Linesmen:
(Latvia) Maksims Bogdanovs
(Iceland) Sindri Gunnarsson

	0–1	01:46 – Bíró (Molnár)
	0–2	04:47 – Lorincz (Trancă, Flinta)
	0–3	08:16 – Zsók (Timaru)
	0–4	23:57 – Mihály (Zsók)
Filipović (Sretovic) (PP) – 28:16	1–4
	1–5	28:38 – Papp (Zsók)
Ilić (Ogrizović) – 30:55	2–5
	2–6	38:28 – Lorincz (Trancă, Flinta)
	2–7	41:35 – Timaru (Bíró)
	2–8	44:34 – Bíró (Timaru, Bors)
Gabrić – 46:05	3–8
Popravka (Babić, Sretovic) – 56:31	4–8

6 min
Penalties
2 min
25
Shots
38

13 April 2015; 20:00	Iceland	3–0 (0–0, 0–0, 3–0)	Belgium	Laugardalur Arena, Reykjavík; Attendance: 632

Game reference

Dennis Hedström
Goalies
Arthur Legrand
Referee:
(Poland) Paweł Meszyński
Linesmen:
(Norway) Havar Dahl
(Croatia) Marko Sakovic

Sigurðarson (þormóðsson, Maack) – 40:57	1–0
Alengard (Sigurðarson) (ENG) – 59:07	2–0
Gislason (Sigurðarson, Jónsson) (ENG) – 59:20	3–0

20 min
Penalties
10 min
36
Shots
29

14 April 2015; 13:00	Romania	5–1 (2–0, 0–0, 3–1)	Australia	Laugardalur Arena, Reykjavík; Attendance: 189

Game reference

Ottó Ónodi
Goalies
Fraser Carson
Referee:
(Norway) Roy Hansen
Linesmen:
(Latvia) Maksims Bogdanovs
(Norway) Havar Dahl

Gliga (Góga) – 06:02	1–0
Lorincz (Bors, Góga) – 07:15	2–0
Góga (Bors, Mihály) (PP) – 46:18	3–0
	3–1	48:30 – Humphries (McDowell, Todd)
Mihály (Zsók, Gliga) – 49:43	4–1
Flinta (Timaru, Pysarenko) – 57:21	5–1

12 min
Penalties
8 min
34
Shots
20

14 April 2015; 16:30	Belgium	6–2 (3–0, 2–0, 1–2)	Spain	Laugardalur Arena, Reykjavík; Attendance: 202

Game reference

Jean Cornelis
Goalies
Ander Alcaine
Referee:
(United Kingdom) Liam Sewell
Linesmen:
(France) Thomas Caillot
(Iceland) Sindri Gunnarsson

Dewin (Everart, Paulus) – 02:54	1–0
Vercammen (Kolodziejczyk) (SH) – 08:35	2–0
Morgan (Gyesbreghs, Bremer) (PP) – 12:10	3–0
Pellegrims (Morgan, Engelen) (SH) – 30:10	4–0
Gyesbreghs (Engelen) – 35:15	5–0
	5–1	42:31 – Hernández (Boronat, Muñoz) (PP)
Van Loof (De Smet, Gyesbreghs) – 54:01	6–1
	6–2	56:14 – Palacin (Angles)

37 min
Penalties
20 min
34
Shots
26

14 April 2015; 20:00	Iceland	4–5 (2–2, 2–1, 0–2)	Serbia	Laugardalur Arena, Reykjavík; Attendance: 607

Game reference

Dennis Hedström
Goalies
Arsenije Ranković
Referee:
(Croatia) Vedran Krčelić
Linesmen:
(Austria) Michael Johnstone
(Croatia) Marko Sakovic

þormóðsson (Sigurðarson) – 05:03	1–0
Maack (Helgason, Sigurðarson) – 11:11	2–0
	2–1	18:04 – Luković (Filipović, Vucurević)
	2–2	19:29 – Babić (Sretovic)
Jónsson (R. Hedström, Alengard) (PP2) – 30:51	3–2
	3–3	37:42 – Filipović (Popravka, Luković)
Andrésson (Alengard, Jónsson) – 39:39	4–3
	4–4	45:50 – Brkusanin (Sretovic, Popravka)
	4–5	59:41 – Sretovic (Popravka, Babić)

6 min
Penalties
6 min
32
Shots
25

16 April 2015; 13:00	Romania	4–3 (3–0, 0–2, 1–1)	Belgium	Laugardalur Arena, Reykjavík; Attendance: 102

Game reference

Otto Onodi
Goalies
Jean Cornelis
Referee:
(Croatia) Vedran Krčelić
Linesmen:
(France) Thomas Caillot
(Iceland) Sindri Gunnarsson

Mihály (Góga, Zsók) (PP) – 03:48	1–0
Imecs (Trancă, Lorincz) – 08:46	2–0
Gliga (Mihály, Góga) – 17:23	3–0
	3–1	22:09 – Pellegrims (Gyesbreghs, Kolodziejczyk) (PP)
	3–2	25:53 – Paulus
Gliga (Zsók) – 43:15	4–2
	4–3	47:35 – Morgan (Engelen)

22 min
Penalties
6 min
33
Shots
21

16 April 2015; 16:30	Serbia	3–4 GWS (1–1, 1–1, 1–1) (OT 0–0) (SO: 0–1)	Australia	Laugardalur Arena, Reykjavík; Attendance: 182

Game reference

Arsenije Ranković
Goalies
Fraser Carson
Referee:
(Poland) Paweł Meszyński
Linesmen:
(Croatia) Marko Sakovic
(Iceland) Orri Sigmarsson

	0–1	02:26 – Malloy (Oddy, Dunwoodie)
Sretovic (Babić) (SH) – 08:57	1–1
	1–2	27:33 – McDowell (Malloy)
Filipović (Milovanović, Vucurević) – 39:57	2–2
	2–3	42:01 – Oddy (Malloy, Darge)
Babić (Sretovic, Popravka) – 49:00	3–3

Popravka (miss)
Sretovic
Filipović (miss)
Shootout
McDowell
(miss) Darge
Malloy
10 min
Penalties
10 min
36
Shots
33

16 April 2015; 20:00	Iceland	2–4 (0–1, 1–1, 1–2)	Spain	Laugardalur Arena, Reykjavík; Attendance: 672

Game reference

Dennis Hedström
Goalies
Ander Alcaine
Referee:
(Norway) Roy Hansen
Linesmen:
(Latvia) Maksims Bogdanovs
(Norway) Havar Dahl

	0–1	19:19 – G. Betran (Muñoz, P. González) (PP)
	0–2	24:15 – Solorzano (Puyuelo, Fuentes)
Gislason (Sigurðarson) – 37:35	1–2
	1–3	40:42 – P. González (Muñoz) (PP)
B. Árnason (Leifsson) (PP) – 51:54	2–3
	2–4	59:46 – Puyuelo (ENG)

8 min
Penalties
12 min
23
Shots
30

17 April 2015; 13:00	Belgium	3–2 OT (1–1, 1–1, 0–0) (OT 1–0)	Serbia	Laugardalur Arena, Reykjavík; Attendance: 174

Game reference

Arthur Legrand
Goalies
Arsenije Ranković
Referee:
(United Kingdom) Liam Sewell
Linesmen:
(Austria) Michael Johnstone
(Iceland) Orri Sigmarsson

	0–1	13:51 – Filipović (Milovanović, Vucurević)
Pellegrims (Neven, Kolodziejczyk) (PP) – 17:31	1–1
Kolodziejczyk (Morgan, Pellegrims) – 24:32	2–1
	2–2	26:28 – Milovanović (Luković, Brkusanin)
Morgan (Kolodziejczyk) – 63:44	3–2

10 min
Penalties
8 min
47
Shots
48

17 April 2015; 16:30	Spain	1–7 (0–2, 0–0, 1–5)	Romania	Laugardalur Arena, Reykjavík; Attendance: 127

Game reference

Ander Alcaine
Ignacio García
Goalies
Adrian Catrinoi
Referee:
(Poland) Paweł Meszyński
Linesmen:
(Latvia) Maksims Bogdanovs
(Iceland) Sindri Gunnarsson

	0–1	05:06 – Mihály (Gliga)
	0–2	13:45 – Mihály (Gliga, Bors)
Muñoz (Boronat) – 42:50	1–2
	1–3	47:29 – Mihály (Gliga, Zsók)
	1–4	51:40 – Bíró (Timaru, Molnár)
	1–5	55:09 – Trancă (Góga, Mihály) (EA)
	1–6	55:38 – Lorincz (Pysarenko, Trancă)
	1–7	59:48 – Molnár (Bíró, Papp) (PP)

6 min
Penalties
4 min
25
Shots
40

17 April 2015; 20:00	Australia	1–6 (1–2, 0–2, 0–2)	Iceland	Laugardalur Arena, Reykjavík; Attendance: 717

Game reference

Fraser Carson
Goalies
Dennis Hedström
Referee:
(Norway) Roy Hansen
Linesmen:
(France) Thomas Caillot
(Norway) Havar Dahl

	0–1	06:06 – Alengard (Gislason) (PP)
	0–2	17:20 – þormóðsson (Magnússon)
McKenzie (Humphries) – 18:55	1–2
	1–3	29:05 – R. Hedström (Gislason)
	1–4	30:28 – Sigurðarson (SH)
	1–5	50:52 – I. Árnason (R. Hedström)
	1–6	53:15 – Alengard (Jónsson, R. Hedström) (PP)

12 min
Penalties
10 min
28
Shots
25

19 April 2015; 13:00	Serbia	4–3 GWS (0–1, 1–2, 2–0) (OT 0–0) (SO: 1–0)	Spain	Laugardalur Arena, Reykjavík; Attendance: 107

Game reference

Arsenije Ranković
Goalies
Ignacio García
Referee:
(Norway) Roy Hansen
Linesmen:
(Norway) Havar Dahl
(Iceland) Orri Sigmarsson

	0–1	09:09 – Angles (Puyuelo)
20:19 – Popravka (Babić, Sretovic)	1–1
	1–2	22:23 – Solorzano (Puyuelo, Fuentes)
	1–3	38:45 – G. González (Muñoz)
45:44 – Babić (Sretovic, Popravka)	2–3
51:36 – Janković (Ogrizović, Raković)	3–3

Sretovic
Milovanović (miss)
Babić (miss)
Shootout
(miss) Boronat
(miss) Puyuelo
(miss) Carbonell
6 min
Penalties
6 min
61
Shots
36

19 April 2015; 16:30	Australia	4–10 (1–4, 1–3, 2–3)	Belgium	Laugardalur Arena, Reykjavík; Attendance: 146

Game reference

Fraser Carson
Joshua Broekman
Goalies
Arthur Legrand
Referee:
(Poland) Paweł Meszyński
Linesmen:
(Latvia) Maksims Bogdanovs
(France) Thomas Caillot

	0–1	06:43 – Morgan
	0–2	09:27 – Pellegrims (Morgan, Kolodziejczyk)
	0–3	14:03 – Vercammen (PS)
	0–4	18:17 – Pellegrims (Kolodziejczyk, Engelen)
Webster (Todd, Powell) – 18:35	1–4
	1–5	20:47 – Neven (Kolodziejczyk, Morgan) (PP)
	1–6	25:57 – Bremer (Dewin)
	1–7	29:49 – Bremer (Van Looy, Engelen)
Geric (Todd) – 35:53	2–7
	2–8	41:50 – Morgan (Kolodziejczyk, Gyesbreghs)
	2–9	46:45 – Van Noten (Paulus, Engelen) (PP)
Powell (Todd, Webster) – 51:49	3–9
	3–10	58:34 – Morgan (Paulus, Pellegrims)
Geric (Darge, Malloy) (PP) – 59:50	4–10

14 min
Penalties
16 min
37
Shots
35

19 April 2015; 20:00	Romania	3–2 OT (1–0, 1–1, 0–1) (OT 1–0)	Iceland	Laugardalur Arena, Reykjavík; Attendance: 834

Game reference

Adrian Catrinoi
Otto Onodi
Goalies
Snorri Sigurbergsson
Referee:
(United Kingdom) Liam Sewell
Linesmen:
(Austria) Michael Johnstone
(Croatia) Marko Sakovic

Csergo (Tapu, Irimia) – 09:55	1–0
	1–1	24:00 – Alengard (R. Hedström)
Munteanu (Pysarenko) – 29:11	2–1
	2–2	53:58 – R. Hedström (Helgason, Alengard)
Gliga (Zsók, Góga) – 62:45	3–2

4 min
Penalties
4 min
38
Shots
30

=== Awards and statistics ===
==== Awards ====
- Best players selected by the directorate:
  - Best Goaltender: (Belgium) Arthur Legrand
  - Best Defenceman: (Romania) Attila Góga
  - Best Forward: (Iceland) Björn Sigurðarson

Source: IIHF.com

==== Scoring leaders ====
List shows the top skaters sorted by points, then goals.

Player	GP	G	A	Pts	+/−	PIM	POS
(Belgium) Mitch Morgan	5	6	4	10	+3	0	F
(Serbia) Marko Sretovic	5	3	7	10	−3	4	F
(Belgium) Bryan Kolodziejczyk	5	1	9	10	+4	4	F
(Romania) Ede Mihály	5	6	3	9	+7	0	F
(Romania) Roberto Gliga	5	4	5	9	+6	9	F
(Romania) Levente Zsók	5	1	7	8	+7	2	F
(Iceland) Emil Alengard	5	4	3	7	+3	0	F
(Belgium) Maxime Pellegrims	5	4	3	7	1	2	F
(Serbia) Miloš Babić	5	3	4	7	+1	2	F
(Iceland) Robin Hedström	5	2	5	7	+2	0	F
(Serbia) Pavel Popravka	5	2	5	7	+1	4	F
(Iceland) Björn Sigurðarson	5	2	5	7	+4	4	F

GP = Games played; G = Goals; A = Assists; Pts = Points; +/− = Plus/minus; PIM = Penalties in minutes; POS = Position
Source: IIHF.com

==== Goaltending leaders ====
Only the top five goaltenders, based on save percentage, who have played at least 40% of their team's minutes, are included in this list.

Player	TOI	GA	GAA	SA	Sv%	SO
(Belgium) Arthur Legrand	183:26	7	2.29	121	94.21	0
(Iceland) Dennis Hedström	239:15	9	2.26	112	91.96	0
(Romania) Otto Onodi	152:47	5	1.96	59	91.53	0
(Romania) Adrian Catrinoi	149:58	6	2.40	62	90.32	0
(Serbia) Arsenije Ranković	284:39	19	4.00	168	88.69	0

TOI = Time on ice (minutes:seconds); SA = Shots against; GA = Goals against; GAA = Goals against average; Sv% = Save percentage; SO = Shutouts
Source: IIHF.com

== Division II B ==
2015 IIHF World Championship Division II B

Tournament details
- Host country: South Africa
- Venue: 1 (in 1 host city)
- Dates: 13–19 April
- Teams: 6

Tournament statistics
- Games played: 15
- Goals scored: 126 (8.4 per game)
- Attendance: 4,263 (284 per game)
- Scoring leader: (Bulgaria) Ivan Hodulov (11 points)

Official website
- IIHF.com

=== Participants ===
Team	Qualification
Israel	Placed 6th in Division II A last year and were relegated.
Mexico	Placed 2nd in Division II B last year.
New Zealand	Placed 3rd in Division II B last year.
China	Placed 4th in Division II B last year.
South Africa	Host, placed 5th in Division II B last year.
Bulgaria	Placed 1st in Division III last year and were promoted.

=== Match officials ===
4 referees and 7 linesmen were selected for the tournament.

Referees

- (Austria) Manuel Nikolic
- (Slovakia) Tomáš Orolin
- (Spain) Alexey Roshchyn
- (Lithuania) Andrej Simankov

Linesman

- (South Africa) Jonathan Burger
- (Germany) Christoffer Hurtik
- (Lithuania) Benas Jakšys
- (Lithuania) Vytautas Lukoševičius
- (Italy) Marco Mori
- (South Korea) Park Jun-soo
- (Switzerland) Marc-Henri Progin

=== Standings ===
Team	Pld	W	OTW	OTL	L	GF	GA	GD	Pts	Promotion or relegation
China	5	4	1	0	0	33	15	+18	14	Promoted to Division II A for 2016
New Zealand	5	3	0	0	2	21	17	+4	9	
Mexico	5	3	0	0	2	24	15	+9	9	
Bulgaria	5	2	0	0	3	17	30	−13	6	
Israel	5	1	0	1	3	20	29	−9	4	
South Africa	5	1	0	0	4	11	20	−9	3	Relegated to Division III for 2016

Source: IIHF

=== Results ===
All times are local (UTC+2).

13 April 2015; 13:00	New Zealand	6–3 (1–1, 3–1, 2–1)	Israel	Grandwest Ice Arena, Cape Town; Attendance: 110

Game reference

Richard Parry
Goalies
Boris Amromin
Alexander Loginov
Referee:
(Slovakia) Tomáš Orolin
Linesmen:
(Republic of Ireland) Vytautas Lukoševičius
(Switzerland) Marc-Henri Progin

	0–1	06:56 – Frenkel (PP)
Henderson (Harrop) – 08:10	1–1
Henderson (Challis, Harrop) (PP) – 24:27	2–1
	2–2	26:34 – Spektor (Maaravi, Aharonovich) (PP)
Heyd (Henderson, Cox) – 36:27	3–2
J. Hay (Chai, Attwell) – 39:08	4–2
Chai (Attwell) – 47:19	5–2
Cox (Henderson, Heyd) – 47:32	6–2
	6–3	52:45 – Pyshkin (Mazour, S. Levy)

12 min
Penalties
8 min
39
Shots
16

13 April 2015; 16:15	Bulgaria	3–10 (1–3, 1–3, 1–4)	China	Grandwest Ice Arena, Cape Town; Attendance: 80

Game reference

Nikola Nikolov
Dimitar Dimitrov
Goalies
Liu Zhiwei
Xia Shengrong
Referee:
(Austria) Manuel Nikolic
Linesmen:
(South Africa) Jonathan Burger
(Germany) Christoffer Hurtik

	0–1	02:20 – Yang (Zhang H.) (SH)
	0–2	02:57 – Liu L. (Chen, Xia T.)
	0–3	04:59 – Zhang H. (Yang, Qu)
Hodulov (Boyadjiev, Mihov) (PP) – 16:19	1–3
Panev (Gatchev, Stefanov) – 34:43	2–3
	2–4	36:22 – Qu (Li Z., Xia T.)
	2–5	38:05 – Ji
	2–6	38:53 – Xia T. (Qu)
	2–7	42:36 – Zhu (Guan, Fu)
Nikolov (Hodulov, Dikov) (PP) – 44:41	3–7
	3–8	54:37 – Xia T. (Zhang H., Bao)
	3–9	56:06 – Li H.
	3–10	58:41 – Li H. (Cui, Liu Q.)

2 min
Penalties
14 min
19
Shots
29

13 April 2015; 20:00	Mexico	4–1 (1–0, 2–1, 1–0)	South Africa	Grandwest Ice Arena, Cape Town; Attendance: 375

Game reference

Alfonso de Alba
Goalies
Ashley Bock
Referee:
(Lithuania) Andrej Simankov
Linesmen:
(Italy) Marco Mori
(South Korea) Park Jun-soo

Colás (Gómez) – 04:17	1–0
Gómez (de la Vega) (PP) – 23:55	2–0
Arroyo (Chabat) – 25:12	3–0
	3–1	27:19 – Krotz (Carelse) (PP2)
Cervantes (Majul) – 45:30	4–1

26 min
Penalties
20 min
20
Shots
33

14 April 2015; 13:00	Israel	3–4 GWS (0–1, 1–0, 2–2) (OT 0–0) (SO: 0–1)	China	Grandwest Ice Arena, Cape Town; Attendance: 57

Game reference

Alexander Loginov
Goalies
Liu Zhiwei
Referee:
(Spain) Alexey Roshchyn
Linesmen:
(South Africa) Jonathan Burger
(Lithuania) Benas Jakšys

	0–1	06:13 – Li H. (Cui, Liu Q.) (PP)
Aharonovich – 31:48	1–1
	1–2	41:37 – Cui (Li H.) (SH)
Pyshkin (Maaravi) – 44:08	2–2
Spektor (Pyshkin) – 56:09	3–2
	3–3	57:56 – Xia T. (Qu, Zhang H.) (PP)

Pyshkin
Mazour (miss)
Spektor (miss)
Shootout
Chen
(miss) Qu
Zhang C.
20 min
Penalties
14 min
23
Shots
46

14 April 2015; 16:15	Mexico	3–5 (1–2, 1–2, 1–1)	New Zealand	Grandwest Ice Arena, Cape Town; Attendance: 77

Game reference

Andrés de la Garma
Goalies
Richard Parry
Referee:
(Austria) Manuel Nikolic
Linesmen:
(Germany) Christoffer Hurtik
(South Korea) Park Jun-soo

de la Vega (Gómez, Sierra) – 03:43	1–0
	1–1	06:46 – Henderson (J. Hay, Haines)
	1–2	13:19 – Heyd
Majul (Chabat, Ugarte) – 21:34	2–2
	2–3	24:55 – Frear (Lawrence)
	2–4	39:14 – Challis
Chabat (Majul) (PP) – 40:42	3–4
	3–5	55:46 – Heyd (Cox, Henderson)

20 min
Penalties
16 min
42
Shots
27

14 April 2015; 20:00	South Africa	1–2 (0–0, 1–1, 0–1)	Bulgaria	Grandwest Ice Arena, Cape Town; Attendance: 275

Game reference

Ashley Bock
Goalies
Dimitar Dimitrov
Referee:
(Slovakia) Tomáš Orolin
Linesmen:
(Republic of Ireland) Vytautas Lukoševičius
(Switzerland) Marc-Henri Progin

	0–1	27:33 – Nikolov (Hodulov)
Nebe – 36:57	1–1
	1–2	58:49 – Nikolov (Boyadjiev, Stefanov) (PP2)

18 min
Penalties
22 min
53
Shots
26

16 April 2015; 13:00	Mexico	9–1 (3–0, 0–0, 6–1)	Bulgaria	Grandwest Ice Arena, Cape Town; Attendance: 75

Game reference

Andrés de la Garma
Goalies
Dimitar Dimitrov
Referee:
(Spain) Alexei Roshchyn
Linesmen:
(South Africa) Jonathan Burger
(South Korea) Pard Jun-soo

Gómez (Arroyo, Chabat) – 12:25	1–0
Linares (Smithers, Cervantes) – 12:57	2–0
Sierra (Cervantes, de la Vega) – 19:51	3–0
Chabat – 41:09	4–0
	4–1	42:15 – Stefanov (Nikolov, Bozhanov)
Chabat (Tommasi, Gómez) – 55:03	5–1
Majul (Gómez, Cervantes) – 57:19	6–1
Gómez (Chabat, Linares) – 58:10	7–1
Smithers (Carrero) – 58:22	8–1
Majul (Cervantes) – 59:26	9–1

18 min
Penalties
12 min
54
Shots
15

16 April 2015; 16:15	New Zealand	4–7 (1–2, 3–1, 0–4)	China	Grandwest Ice Arena, Cape Town; Attendance: 112

Game reference

Jaden Pine-Murphy
Richard Parry
Goalies
Liu Zhiwei
Referee:
(Lithuania) Andrej Simankov
Linesmen:
(Italy) Marco Mori
(Switzerland) Marc-Henri Progin

Harrison (J. Hay, Harrop) – 08:04	1–0
	1–1	10:23 – Zhu (Guan) (PP)
	1–2	18:39 – Chen (Liu Q., Liu L.)
	1–3	22:04 – Ji (Li X.) (PP)
Haines (Heyd, Parry) (PP) – 34:27	2–3
Wannamaker (Cox) (PP) – 36:15	3–3
Cox (Heyd) – 37:04	4–3
	4–4	49:38 – Liu L. (Cui)
	4–5	51:11 – Cui
	4–6	53:24 – Yang (Qu) (PP)
	4–7	54:14 – Li H. (Cui)

36 min
Penalties
26 min
46
Shots
45

16 April 2015; 20:00	Israel	6–3 (1–1, 4–0, 1–2)	South Africa	Grandwest Ice Arena, Cape Town; Attendance: 922

Game reference

Alexander Loginov
Goalies
Ashley Bock
Marcello Strydom
Referee:
(Austria) Manuel Nikolic
Linesmen:
(Germany) Christoffer Hurtik
(Lithuania) Benas Jakšys

	0–1	04:49 – Krotz (Magmoed, Birrell) (PP)
Spivak (Frenkel) (PP) – 09:40	1–1
Spivak (Avneri, Mazour) – 23:48	2–1
Frenkel (I. Levy, S. Levy) – 24:18	3–1
Mazour (Spivak, Pyshkin) (PP) – 31:01	4–1
Aharonovich (Spektor) – 31:57	5–1
Mazour (Frenkel, Pyshkin) (PP) – 46:04	6–1
	6–2	53:31 – Giot (Krotz, Marais)
	6–3	59:23 – Marais

16 min
Penalties
10 min
26
Shots
39

17 April 2015; 13:00	China	5–2 (2–0, 2–2, 1–0)	Mexico	Grandwest Ice Arena, Cape Town; Attendance: 48

Game reference

Liu Zhiwei
Goalies
Alfonso de Alba
Referee:
(Slovakia) Tomáš Orolin
Linesmen:
(South Africa) Jonathan Burger
(Lithuania) Vytautas Lukoševičius

Cui (Na) – 03:30	1–0
Cui – 09:10	2–0
	2–1	23:04 – Carrero (Cervantes)
	2–2	24:56 – Rosette (Cervantes, Majul)
Zhu – 31:08	3–2
Chen – 32:54	4–2
Li X. – 41:33	5–2

22 min
Penalties
2 min
50
Shots
52

17 April 2015; 16:15	Bulgaria	10–5 (6–1, 2–2, 2–2)	Israel	Grandwest Ice Arena, Cape Town; Attendance: 43

Game reference

Dimitar Dimitrov
Goalies
Alexander Loginov
Boris Amromin
Referee:
(Lithuania) Andrej Simankov
Linesmen:
(Germany) Christoffer Hurtik
(Italy) Marco Mori

Boyadjiev (Hodulov) – 04:12	1–0
Gatchev (Nikolov) – 04:36	2–0
Hodulov (Boyadjiev) – 04:59	3–0
Blagoev (Boyadjiev, Hodulov) – 06:36	4–0
Boyadjiev (Blagoev) – 11:37	5–0
Hodulov (Nikolov, Boyadjiev) (PP) – 15:13	6–0
	6–1	15:28 – Aharonovich (Oz, Spivak)
Hodulov (Nikolov) (SH) – 24:14	7–1
	7–2	27:09 – Avneri (I. Levy, S. Levy)
Hodulov (Blagoev) – 30:51	8–2
	8–3	32:53 – Spektor (SH)
Nikolov (Gatchev) – 44:44	9–3
	9–4	47:04 – Frenkel (Spivak, Pyshkin) (PP)
	9–5	52:28 – Spivak (Spektor, S. Levy)
Hodulov (Boyadjiev) (PP) – 58:39	10–5

16 min
Penalties
36 min
37
Shots
68

17 April 2015; 20:00	South Africa	3–1 (0–0, 2–0, 1–1)	New Zealand	Grandwest Ice Arena, Cape Town; Attendance: 985

Game reference

Richard Parry
Goalies
Ashley Bock
Referee:
(Spain) Alexey Roshchyn
Linesmen:
(Lithuania) Benas Jakšys
(Switzerland) Marc-Henri Progin

Samaai (Birrell, Magmoed) – 34:07	1–0
Samaai (Krotz, Marais) (PP) – 39:26	2–0
	2–1	47:30 – Harrison (Heyd) (PP)
Samaai (Bremner, Nebe) (ENG) – 59:53	3–1

10 min
Penalties
14 min
36
Shots
52

19 April 2015; 13:00	New Zealand	5–1 (0–0, 2–1, 3–0)	Bulgaria	Grandwest Ice Arena, Cape Town; Attendance: 69

Game reference

Jaden Pine-Murphy
Goalies
Dimitar Dimitrov
Referee:
(Slovakia) Tomáš Orolin
Linesmen:
(South Africa) Jonathan Burger
(Lithuania) Vytautas Lukoševičius

Challis (Henderson, Lawrence) (PP) – 21:03	1–0
Frear (Cox) – 31:54	2–0
	2–1	36:01 – Hodulov (Boyadjiev)
Henderson (Attwell) – 49:34	3–1
Cox (Heyd, Henderson) – 49:53	4–1
Frear (Henderson) – 58:18	5–1

12 min
Penalties
10 min
46
Shots
31

19 April 2015; 16:15	Israel	3–6 (1–1, 0–2, 2–3)	Mexico	Grandwest Ice Arena, Cape Town; Attendance: 67

Game reference

Alexander Loginov
Goalies
Alfonso de Alba
Referee:
(Austria) Manuel Nikolic
Linesmen:
(South Korea) Park Jun-soo
(Switzerland) Marc-Henri Progin

I. Levy (Avneri) – 02:10	1–0
	1–1	14:51 – Colás (Cervantes, Rosette)
	1–2	32:56 – de la Vega (Gómez, Sierra) (PP)
	1–3	34:25 – Colás (Escandon)
Mazour (S. Levy) – 52:07	2–3
	2–4	52:02 – Majul (Escandon)
	2–5	54:35 – Chabat (Arroyo, Ugarte) (PP)
Mazour (Spivak, Frenkel) (PP) – 58:03	3–5
	3–6	59:44 – Gómez (Majul, Cervantes) (ENG)

12 min
Penalties
6 min
31
Shots
45

19 April 2015; 20:00	China	7–3 (3–1, 3–2, 1–0)	South Africa	Grandwest Ice Arena, Cape Town; Attendance: 968

Game reference

Liu Zhiwei
Goalies
Ashley Bock
Referee:
(Spain) Alexey Roshchyn
Linesmen:
(Lithuania) Benas Jakšys
(Italy) Marco Mori

Liu L. (Fu) (PP) – 02:25	1–0
Xia T. (Qu, Zhang H.) (PP) – 15:20	2–0
	2–1	16:06 – Samaai
Xia T. (Qu, Liu L.) (PP) – 17:58	3–1
Chen (Cui, Li H.) – 21:49	4–1
Li X. (Ji, Zhu) – 22:35	5–1
Liu L. (Chen, Cui) – 23:50	6–1
	6–2	26:02 – Reeves (Birrell) (PP)
	6–3	32:01 – Birrell (Marais, Samaai)
Bao (Zhang C., Fu) – 45:14	7–3

14 min
Penalties
26 min
35
Shots
26

=== Awards and statistics ===
==== Awards ====
- Best players selected by the directorate:
  - Best Goaltender: (Bulgaria) Dimitar Dimitrov
  - Best Defenceman: (Israel) Daniel Spivak
  - Best Forward: (Mexico) Héctor Majul

Source: IIHF.com

==== Scoring leaders ====
List shows the top skaters sorted by points, then goals.

Player	GP	G	A	Pts	+/−	PIM	POS
(Bulgaria) Ivan Hodulov	5	6	5	11	+1	4	F
(China) Cui Xijun	5	4	6	10	+7	8	F
(New Zealand) Nicholas Henderson	5	4	6	10	+9	0	F
(Mexico) Héctor Majul	5	5	4	9	+4	14	F
(Mexico) Carlos Gómez	5	4	5	9	+4	6	F
(Bulgaria) Martin Boyadjiev	5	2	7	9	−3	10	F
(Mexico) Adrian Cervantes	5	1	8	9	+4	4	F
(Mexico) Roberto Chabat	5	4	4	8	0	0	F
(Bulgaria) Martin Nikolov	5	4	4	8	−2	6	F
(New Zealand) Andrew Cox	5	3	5	8	+5	14	F
(New Zealand) Paris Heyd	5	3	5	8	+2	10	F

GP = Games played; G = Goals; A = Assists; Pts = Points; +/− = Plus/minus; PIM = Penalties in minutes; POS = Position
Source: IIHF.com

==== Goaltending leaders ====
Only the top five goaltenders, based on save percentage, who have played at least 40% of their team's minutes, are included in this list.

Player	TOI	GA	GAA	SA	Sv%	SO
(China) Liu Zhiwei	285:00	14	2.95	160	91.25	0
(New Zealand) Richard Parry	219:57	13	3.55	130	90.00	0
(Bulgaria) Dimitar Dimitrov	295:01	27	5.49	254	89.37	0
(Mexico) Alfonso de Alba	180:00	9	3.00	84	89.29	0
(Israel) Alexander Loginov	250:24	22	5.27	170	87.06	0

TOI = Time on ice (minutes:seconds); SA = Shots against; GA = Goals against; GAA = Goals against average; Sv% = Save percentage; SO = Shutouts
Source: IIHF.com
