= 1990 Men's Ice Hockey World Championships =

1990 edition of the Men's World Ice Hockey Championships

Tournament details
- Host country: Switzerland
- Venues: 2 (in 2 host cities)
- Dates: 16 April – 2 May
- Teams: 8

Final positions
- Champions: Soviet Union (22nd title)
- Runners-up: Sweden
- Third place: Czechoslovakia
- Fourth place: Canada

Tournament statistics
- Games played: 40
- Goals scored: 276 (6.9 per game)
- Attendance: 250,309 (6,258 per game)
- Scoring leader: (Canada) Steve Yzerman 19 points

The 1990 Men's Ice Hockey World Championships was the 54th such event sanctioned by the International Ice Hockey Federation (IIHF), and at the same time served as the 65th Ice Hockey European Championships. Teams representing 28 countries participated in several levels of competition. The competition also served as qualifications for group placements in the 1991 competition.

The top Championship Group A tournament took place in Switzerland from 16 April to 2 May 1990, with games played in Bern and Fribourg. Eight teams took part, with each team playing each other once. The four best teams then played each other once more. The Soviet Union became world champions for the 22nd and last time, and Sweden won their tenth European title. In the European Championships, only matches between European teams in the first round were counted towards scoring.

Group B saw East Germany participate in the World Championships for the final time.

== World Championship Group A (Switzerland) ==
=== First round ===
Pos	Team	Pld	W	D	L	GF	GA	GD	Pts
1	Canada	7	6	1	0	36	16	+20	13
2	Sweden	7	6	0	1	29	11	+18	12
3	Soviet Union	7	5	1	1	38	12	+26	11
4	Czechoslovakia	7	4	0	3	28	18	+10	8
5	United States	7	3	0	4	23	37	−14	6
6	Finland	7	1	1	5	18	27	−9	3
7	Norway	7	1	1	5	19	45	−26	3
8	West Germany	7	0	0	7	11	36	−25	0

16 April	Canada	5–1	West Germany

16 April	Soviet Union	9–1	Norway

16 April	Czechoslovakia	7–1	United States

16 April	Sweden	4–2	Finland

17 April	Canada	6–3	United States

17 April	Soviet Union	5–2	West Germany

17 April	Sweden	4–3	Norway

17 April	Czechoslovakia	4–2	Finland

19 April	Canada	6–5	Finland

19 April	Soviet Union	10–1	United States

19 April	Czechoslovakia	9–1	Norway

19 April	Sweden	6–0	West Germany

20 April	Canada	8–0	Norway

20 April	Sweden	6–1	United States

20 April	Czechoslovakia	3–0	West Germany

20 April	Soviet Union	6–1	Finland

22 April	Canada	5–3	Czechoslovakia

22 April	Sweden	3–1	Soviet Union

22 April	United States	6–3	West Germany

22 April	Norway	3–3	Finland

23 April	United States	9–4	Norway

23 April	Finland	4–2	West Germany

24 April	Canada	3–1	Sweden

24 April	Soviet Union	4–1	Czechoslovakia

25 April	Norway	7–3	West Germany

25 April	United States	2–1	Finland

26 April	Canada	3–3	Soviet Union

26 April	Sweden	5–1	Czechoslovakia

=== Final Round ===
Pos	Team	Pld	W	D	L	GF	GA	GD	Pts
1	Soviet Union	3	3	0	0	15	1	+14	6
2	Sweden	3	1	1	1	11	12	−1	3
3	Czechoslovakia	3	1	1	1	8	12	−4	3
4	Canada	3	0	0	3	7	16	−9	0

28 April	Czechoslovakia	3–2	Canada

28 April	Soviet Union	3–0	Sweden

30 April	Soviet Union	7–1	Canada

30 April	Sweden	5–5	Czechoslovakia

2 May	Sweden	6–4	Canada

2 May	Soviet Union	5–0	Czechoslovakia

=== Consolation round ===
Pos	Team	Pld	W	D	L	GF	GA	GD	Pts
5	United States	10	6	0	4	35	43	−8	12
6	Finland	10	2	2	6	29	32	−3	6
7	West Germany	10	1	1	8	19	42	−23	3
8	Norway	10	1	1	8	21	61	−40	3

Norway needing to keep their final game within four goals, lost four to nothing to the Germans, and were relegated.

- Following the reunification of Germany, the Federal Republic of Germany ceased being referred to as West Germany and, starting in 1991, was simply referred to as Germany

27 April	Finland	8–1	Norway

27 April	United States	5–3	West Germany

29 April	Finland	1–1	West Germany

29 April	United States	4–1	Norway

1 May	United States	3–2	Finland

1 May	West Germany	4–0	Norway

== World Championship Group B (France) ==
Played in Lyon and Megève 29 March to 8 April.

Pos	Team	Pld	W	D	L	GF	GA	GD	Pts
9	Switzerland	7	5	2	0	30	14	+16	12
10	Italy	7	5	1	1	41	18	+23	11
11	Austria	7	4	2	1	30	14	+16	10
12	France	7	4	1	2	19	20	−1	9
13	East Germany	7	2	2	3	22	19	+3	6
14	Poland	7	2	2	3	25	25	0	6
15	Japan	7	0	1	6	13	41	−28	1
16	Netherlands	7	0	1	6	14	43	−29	1

Switzerland was promoted to Group A. The Netherlands would have been relegated but gained a reprieve when East Germany ceased to participate because of the reunification of Germany.

29 March	France	4–3	Austria

29 March	Italy	7–1	Japan

29 March	Poland	7–1	Netherlands

29 March	Switzerland	2–2	East Germany

30 March	Switzerland	6–1	Netherlands

31 March	East Germany	2–3	France

31 March	Austria	3–3	Italy

31 March	Japan	2–8	Poland

1 April	France	4–2	Netherlands

1 April	Italy	6–3	East Germany

1 April	Switzerland	6–1	Japan

2 April	Poland	1–4	Austria

3 April	Italy	8–3	Netherlands

3 April	East Germany	1–1	Poland

3 April	Japan	2–3	France

3 April	Austria	2–2	Switzerland

5 April	Netherlands	3–6	East Germany

5 April	Austria	7–2	Japan

5 April	Poland	3–5	Switzerland

5 April	Italy	4–1	France

6 April	Netherlands	0–8	Austria

6 April	Japan	1–6	East Germany

7 April	Switzerland	5–4	Italy

7 April	France	3–3	Poland

8 April	East Germany	2–3	Austria

8 April	Netherlands	4–4	Japan

8 April	France	1–4	Switzerland

8 April	Poland	2–9	Italy

== World Championship Group C (Hungary) ==
Played in Budapest Hungary 28 March to 8 April.

Pos	Team	Pld	W	D	L	GF	GA	GD	Pts
17	Yugoslavia	8	7	1	0	57	16	+41	15
18	Denmark	8	7	0	1	55	14	+41	14
19	China	8	4	1	3	34	29	+5	9
20	Romania	8	4	1	3	36	27	+9	9
21	North Korea	8	4	0	4	27	35	−8	8
22	Bulgaria	8	4	0	4	31	38	−7	8
23	Hungary	8	2	1	5	33	28	+5	5
24	Belgium	8	1	0	7	16	67	−51	2
25	South Korea	8	1	0	7	22	57	−35	2

Yugoslavia was promoted to Group B. Both Belgium and South Korea were reprieved from relegation as the reunification of Germany left Group B one team short, and Group D was shut down as there were not enough teams.

28 March	China	2–3	Bulgaria

28 March	Hungary	11–0	Belgium

28 March	Yugoslavia	4–2	South Korea

29 March	Denmark	15–1	Belgium

29 March	Romania	2–4	China

29 March	Bulgaria	3–5	North Korea

30 March	Yugoslavia	6–3	Romania

30 March	South Korea	2–10	Hungary

30 March	Denmark	8–0	North Korea

31 March	Hungary	2–3	China

31 March	Bulgaria	3–6	Yugoslavia

31 March	South Korea	1–6	Belgium

1 April	Romania	2–4	Denmark

1 April	North Korea	6–3	China

1 April	Belgium	3–5	Bulgaria

2 April	Yugoslavia	8–2	North Korea

2 April	Denmark	10–1	South Korea

2 April	Romania	2–2	Hungary

3 April	Yugoslavia	17–1	Belgium

3 April	China	10–3	South Korea

3 April	Hungary	3–5	Bulgaria

4 April	Belgium	0–3	North Korea

4 April	Bulgaria	2–7	Romania

4 April	Denmark	6–1	China

5 April	South Korea	4–6	Romania

5 April	North Korea	4–2	Hungary

5 April	Yugoslavia	5–1	Denmark

6 April	Bulgaria	8–5	South Korea

6 April	Hungary	1–8	Yugoslavia

6 April	Belgium	4–8	China

7 April	North Korea	4–7	Romania

7 April	Denmark	7–2	Bulgaria

8 April	South Korea	4–3	North Korea

8 April	Belgium	1–7	Romania

8 April	Yugoslavia	3–3	China

8 April	Denmark	4–2	Hungary

== World Championship Group D (Great Britain) ==
Played in Cardiff, Great Britain 20–25 March.

Pos	Team	Pld	W	D	L	GF	GA	GD	Pts
26	Great Britain	4	4	0	0	57	7	+50	8
27	Australia	4	0	2	2	10	34	−24	2
28	Spain	4	0	2	2	11	37	−26	2

Great Britain was promoted to Group C.

20 March	Australia	2–2	Spain

21 March	Great Britain	14–0	Australia

22 March	Spain	1–13	Great Britain

23 March	Spain	5–5	Australia

24 March	Australia	3–13	Great Britain

25 March	Great Britain	17–3	Spain

== Ranking and statistics ==
1990 IIHF World Championship winners

Soviet Union
22nd title

=== Tournament Awards ===
- Best players selected by the directorate:
  - Best Goaltender: (Soviet Union) Artūrs Irbe
  - Best Defenceman: (Soviet Union) Mikhail Tatarinov
  - Best Forward: (Canada) Steve Yzerman
- Media All-Star Team:
  - Goaltender: (Czechoslovakia) Dominik Hašek
  - Defence: (Soviet Union) Viacheslav Fetisov, (Soviet Union) Mikhail Tatarinov
  - Forwards: (Soviet Union) Andrei Khomutov, (Czechoslovakia) Robert Reichel, (Canada) Steve Yzerman

=== Final standings ===
The final standings of the tournament according to IIHF:

1st place, gold medalist(s)	Soviet Union
2nd place, silver medalist(s)	Sweden
3rd place, bronze medalist(s)	Czechoslovakia
4	Canada
5	United States
6	Finland
7	West Germany
8	Norway

=== European championships final standings ===
The final standings of the European championships according to IIHF:

Gold medal	Sweden
Silver medal	Soviet Union
Bronze medal	Czechoslovakia
4	Finland
5	Norway
6	West Germany

=== Scoring leaders ===
List shows the top skaters sorted by points, then goals.

Player	GP	G	A	Pts	+/−	PIM	POS
(Canada) Steve Yzerman	10	9	10	19	+6	8	F
(Soviet Union) Andrei Khomutov	10	11	5	16	+18	4	F
(Sweden) Kent Nilsson	10	10	2	12	+12	6	F
(Czechoslovakia) Robert Reichel	10	5	6	11	+4	4	F
(Sweden) Håkan Loob	10	4	7	11	+10	10	F
(Canada) Theoren Fleury	9	4	7	11	+9	10	F
(Sweden) Thomas Rundqvist	10	3	8	11	+9	6	F
(Soviet Union) Mikhail Tatarinov	10	3	8	11	+23	20	D
(West Germany) Gerd Truntschka	10	4	6	10	−1	15	F
(Soviet Union) Viacheslav Fetisov	8	2	8	10	+20	8	D

=== Leading goaltenders ===
Only the top five goaltenders, based on save percentage, who have played 50% of their team's minutes are included in this list.

Player	MIP	GA	GAA	SVS%	SO
(Soviet Union) Artūrs Irbe	316	5	0.95	.950	2
(United States) Jon Casey	335	15	2.69	.914	0
(Sweden) Rolf Ridderwall	419	16	2.29	.911	1
(Czechoslovakia) Dominik Hašek	480	20	2.50	.904	1
(Finland) Sakari Lindfors	378	15	2.38	.903	0
