= 2008 IIHF World Championship Division II =

Tournament details
- Host countries: Romania; Australia
- Venue(s): 2 (in 2 host cities)
- Dates: 7–13 April 2008
- Teams: 12

The 2008 IIHF World Championship Division II was two international ice hockey tournaments organized by the International Ice Hockey Federation. Division II represents the third level of the Ice Hockey World Championships. For each tournament, the team which placed first was promoted to Division I, while the team which placed last was relegated to Division III for 2009.

== Group A tournament ==
The Group A tournament was played in Miercurea Ciuc, Romania, from 7 to 13 April 2008.

=== Participating teams ===
Team	Qualification
Romania	Hosts; placed 6th in Division I Group B last year and were relegated
Belgium	Placed 2nd in Division II Group A last year
Israel	Placed 3rd in Division II Group B last year
Serbia	Placed 4th in Division II Group A last year
Bulgaria	Placed 5th in Division II Group A last year
Ireland	Placed 2nd in Division III last year and were promoted

=== Final standings ===
Pos	Team	Pld	W	OTW	OTL	L	GF	GA	GD	Pts	Promotion or relegation
1	Romania (H)	5	5	0	0	0	65	2	+63	15	Promoted to the 2009 Division I
2	Belgium	5	3	1	0	1	29	14	+15	11	
3	Serbia	5	3	0	1	1	32	19	+13	10	
4	Israel	5	1	1	0	3	16	28	−12	5	
5	Bulgaria	5	1	0	1	3	14	44	−30	4	
6	Ireland	5	0	0	0	5	8	57	−49	0	Relegated to the 2009 Division III

Source: IIHF
(H) Host

=== Match results ===
All times are local.

7 April 2008; 13:30	Ireland	1–13 (1–2, 0–3, 0–8)	Serbia	Lajos Vákár Ice Hall

Game reference

7 April 2008; 17:00	Belgium	8–1 (4–0, 1–1, 3–0)	Bulgaria	Lajos Vákár Ice Hall

Game reference

7 April 2008; 20:30	Israel	0–13 (0–4, 0–5, 0–4)	Romania	Lajos Vákár Ice Hall

Game reference

8 April 2008; 13:30	Bulgaria	7–4 (2–1, 1–1, 4–2)	Ireland	Lajos Vákár Ice Hall

Game reference

8 April 2008; 17:00	Romania	10–0 (3–0, 4–0, 3–0)	Serbia	Lajos Vákár Ice Hall

Game reference

8 April 2008; 20:30	Belgium	6–3 (2–2, 3–1, 1–0)	Israel	Lajos Vákár Ice Hall

Game reference

10 April 2008; 13:30	Belgium	9–1 (3–0, 4–1, 2–0)	Ireland	Lajos Vákár Ice Hall

Game reference

10 April 2008; 17:00	Israel	1–4 (1–0, 0–3, 0–1)	Serbia	Lajos Vákár Ice Hall

Game reference

10 April 2008; 20:30	Romania	16–0 (7–0, 4–0, 5–0)	Bulgaria	Lajos Vákár Ice Hall

Game reference

11 April 2008; 13:30	Serbia	4–5 (GWS) (3–1, 1–2, 0–1) (0–0, 0–1)	Belgium	Lajos Vákár Ice Hall

Game reference

11 April 2008; 17:00	Bulgaria	4–5 (OT) (1–2, 1–0, 2–2) (0–1)	Israel	Lajos Vákár Ice Hall

Game reference

11 April 2008; 20:30	Ireland	1–21 (0–7, 1–5, 0–9)	Romania	Lajos Vákár Ice Hall

Game reference

13 April 2008; 13:30	Serbia	11–2 (6–0, 5–0, 0–2)	Bulgaria	Lajos Vákár Ice Hall

Game reference

13 April 2008; 17:00	Israel	7–1 (2–0, 4–1, 1–0)	Ireland	Lajos Vákár Ice Hall

Game reference

13 April 2008; 20:30	Romania	5–1 (2–1, 1–0, 2–0)	Belgium	Lajos Vákár Ice Hall

Game reference

== Group B Tournament ==
The Group B tournament was played in Newcastle, Australia, from 7 to 13 April 2008.

=== Participating teams ===
Team	Qualification
China	Placed 6th in Division I Group A last year and were relegated
Australia	Hosts; placed 2nd in Division II Group B last year
Spain	Placed 3rd in Division II Group A last year
Iceland	Placed 4th in Division II Group B last year
Mexico	Placed 5th in Division II Group B last year
New Zealand	Placed 1st in Division III last year and were promoted

=== Final standings ===
Pos	Team	Pld	W	OTW	OTL	L	GF	GA	GD	Pts	Promotion or relegation
1	Australia (H)	5	5	0	0	0	20	6	+14	15	Promoted to the 2009 Division I
2	China	5	2	2	0	1	21	14	+7	10	
3	Spain	5	3	0	1	1	20	19	+1	10	
4	Mexico	5	2	0	0	3	14	20	−6	6	
5	Iceland	5	1	0	1	3	17	21	−4	4	
6	New Zealand	5	0	0	0	5	11	23	−12	0	Relegated to the 2009 Division III

Source: IIHF
(H) Host

=== Match results ===
All times are local.

7 April 2008; 13:00	Spain	4–5 (GWS) (1–0, 2–3, 1–1) (0–0, 0–1)	China	HISS Arena

Game reference

7 April 2008; 16:30	New Zealand	3–6 (1–2, 1–3, 1–1)	Iceland	HISS Arena

Game reference

7 April 2008; 20:00	Australia	7–1 (2–0, 3–1, 2–0)	Mexico	HISS Arena

Game reference

9 April 2008; 13:00	China	5–4 (GWS) (2–1, 1–1, 1–2) (0–0, 1–0)	Iceland	HISS Arena

Game reference

9 April 2008; 16:30	Mexico	2–0 (1–0, 1–0, 0–0)	New Zealand	HISS Arena

Game reference

9 April 2008; 20:00	Australia	5–3 (1–1, 1–2, 3–0)	Spain	HISS Arena

Game reference

10 April 2008; 13:00	China	5–3 (1–3, 2–0, 2–0)	Mexico	HISS Arena

Game reference

10 April 2008; 16:30	Spain	4–3 (1–0, 3–0, 0–3)	Iceland	HISS Arena

Game reference

10 April 2008; 20:00	Australia	4–2 (1–0, 1–2, 2–0)	New Zealand	HISS Arena

Game reference

12 April 2008; 13:00	Mexico	2–4 (1–1, 1–2, 0–1)	Spain	HISS Arena

Game reference

12 April 2008; 16:30	New Zealand	2–6 (2–1, 0–3, 0–2)	China	HISS Arena

Game reference

12 April 2008; 20:00	Iceland	0–3 (0–1, 0–1, 0–1)	Australia	HISS Arena

Game reference

13 April 2008; 13:00	Iceland	4–6 (1–4, 3–1, 0–1)	Mexico	HISS Arena

Game reference

13 April 2008; 16:30	Spain	5–4 (1–1, 1–0, 3–3)	New Zealand	HISS Arena

Game reference

13 April 2008; 20:00	China	0–1 (0–1, 0–0, 0–0)	Australia	HISS Arena

Game reference
