= 2007 IIHF World Championship Division II =

Tournament details
- Host countries: Croatia; South Korea
- Venues: 2 (in 2 host cities)
- Dates: April 11 – April 17; April 2 – April 8
- Teams: 12 (two groups of 6)

The 2007 IIHF World Championship Division II tournament consisted of two groups of six teams. Group A was held in Zagreb, Croatia from April 11 to 17, 2007, while Group B was held in Seoul, South Korea from April 2 to April 8, 2007. Croatia won Group A and South Korea won Group B, with both teams being promoted to the Division I tournament. Turkey was relegated to Division III, as was North Korea, though the latter did not participate and was automatically relegated as a result.

== Group A ==
The IIHF entered Serbia in the 2007 tournament as the successor to the Serbia and Montenegro national team.

=== Standings ===
Team	Pld	W	OTW	OTL	L	GF	GA	GD	Pts	CRO	BEL	ESP	SRB	BUL	TUR
Croatia	5	5	0	0	0	58	10	+48	15	—	13–4	8–2	2–0	10–2	25–2
Belgium	5	4	0	0	1	25	18	+7	12	4–13	—	3–2	2–1	6–0	10–2
Spain	5	3	0	0	2	25	17	+8	9	2–8	2–3	—	7–4	4–0	10–2
Serbia	5	2	0	0	3	18	16	+2	6	0–2	1–2	4–7	—	7–1	6–4
Bulgaria	5	1	0	0	4	10	32	−22	3	2–10	0–6	0–4	1–7	—	7–5
Turkey	5	0	0	0	5	15	58	−43	0	2–25	2–10	2–10	4–6	5–7	—

- Croatia promoted to Division I.
- Turkey demoted to Division III.

== Scoring leaders ==
Player	Country	GP	G	A	Pts	PIM
Marko Lovrencic	Croatia	5	10	7	17	2
Oliver Ciganovic	Croatia	5	7	9	16	14
Damir Gojanovic	Croatia	5	3	11	14	2
Cengiz Ciplak	Turkey	5	9	2	11	6
Kresimir Svigir	Croatia	5	5	6	11	4

== Group B ==
=== Standings ===
Team	Pld	W	OTW	OTL	L	GF	GA	GD	Pts	KOR	AUS	ISR	ISL	MEX	PRK
South Korea	4	4	0	0	0	33	9	+24	12	—	5–4	5–2	17–2	6–1	
Australia	4	3	0	0	1	25	11	+14	9	4–5	—	4–1	5–3	12–2	
Israel	4	2	0	0	2	11	11	0	6	2–5	1–4	—	5–1	3–1	
Iceland	4	1	0	0	3	9	29	−20	3	2–17	3–5	1–5	—	3–2	
Mexico	4	0	0	0	4	6	24	−18	0	1–6	2–12	1–3	2–3	—	
North Korea (W)	0	0	0	0	0	0	0	0	0						—

(W) Withdrew
- South Korea promoted to Division I.
- North Korea demoted to Division III.

== Scoring leaders ==
Player	Country	GP	G	A	Pts	PIM
Kim Kyu-hun	South Korea	4	5	6	11	6
Kim Ki-sung	South Korea	4	5	5	10	0
Park Woo-sang	South Korea	4	3	6	9	2
Kim Eun-jun	South Korea	4	6	2	8	2
Lee Yu-won	South Korea	4	3	5	8	4
