= IIHF World Championship Division II =

Third tier of the IIHF World Championships

- Upcoming season or competition: 2027 IIHF World Championship Division II
- Sport: Ice hockey
- Founded: 1961 (Pool C); 2001 (Division II)
- No. of teams: 12
- Most recent champion: Croatia
- Most titles: Romania (8)
- Promotion to: Division I
- Relegation to: Division III
- Website: IIHF.com

The IIHF World Championship Division II are an annual sports event organized by the International Ice Hockey Federation. The division championships are played in two groups, part of the Ice Hockey World Championships.

From 2001 until 2011, the two national teams that finished last in their groups in Division I were relegated to Division II for next year's World Championships. At the Division II Championship, the winner of each group was promoted to next year's Division I. In contrast, the loser of each group was relegated to the IIHF World Championship Division III. Beginning in 2012, the Group A champion was promoted to Division I Group B, and was replaced by that tournament's last placed team. The Group B champion was promoted to Group A, and was replaced by the team relegated from there. Last place in Group B is relegated to Division III, being replaced by their champion.

The Division II World championships have been played in their current format since 2001. Division II was formed from the teams ranked 29th to 40th, which were the five lowest-placing teams in Pool C, and the seven best teams from Pool D. Beginning in 2012, the two groups became tiered rather than parallel. Teams qualified for Group A by either being relegated from Division I, or placing 2nd or 3rd in their 2011 groups. Group B teams were formed from the teams placing 4th, 5th, or promoted from Division III.

== Results ==
Year	Promoted		Relegated	
2001	South Korea	Romania	New Zealand	Mexico
2002	Estonia	Lithuania	Turkey	Luxembourg
2003	South Korea	Belgium	Mexico	Iceland
2004	China	Lithuania	Luxembourg	South Africa
2005	Croatia	Israel	Turkey	Iceland
2006	Romania	China	South Africa	New Zealand
2007	Croatia	South Korea	Turkey	North Korea
2008	Romania	Australia	Ireland	New Zealand
2009	Serbia	South Korea	North Korea	South Africa
2010	Spain	Estonia	Turkey	Israel
2011	Australia	Romania	North Korea	Ireland

Year	Promoted		Relegated	
Year	To Division I B	To Division II A	To Division II B	To Division III
2012	Estonia	Belgium	New Zealand	South Africa
2013	Croatia	Israel	Spain	Bulgaria
2014	Estonia	Spain	Israel	Turkey
2015	Romania	China	Australia	South Africa
2016	Netherlands	Australia	China	Bulgaria
2017	Romania	China	Spain	Turkey
2018	Netherlands	Spain	Iceland	Luxembourg
2019	Serbia	Israel	Belgium	North Korea
2020	Cancelled due to the COVID-19 pandemic.			
2021	Cancelled due to the COVID-19 pandemic.			
2022	China, Netherlands	Georgia, Iceland	-	-
2023	Spain	United Arab Emirates	Georgia	Mexico
2024	Croatia	Belgium	Iceland	Turkey
2025	Netherlands	Georgia	Israel	Thailand
2026	Tournamanet cancelled	No team promoted	Tournamanet cancelled	Chinese Taipei

== Pool C ==
=== Champions (1961–2000) ===
Following the year 2000, Pool C became Division II and was split into two sections as a result of an influx of competing teams.

Year	National team
1961	Romania
1963	Austria
1966	Italy
1967	Japan
1969	Japan
1970	Austria
1971	Romania
1972	Austria
1973	Norway
1974	Switzerland
1975	Norway
1976	Austria
1977	Italy
1978	Netherlands
1979	Yugoslavia
1981	Austria
1982	Japan
1983	Netherlands
1985	France
1986	Norway
1987	Japan
1989	Netherlands
1990	Yugoslavia
1991	Denmark
1992	Great Britain
1993	Latvia
1994	Slovakia
1995	Belarus
1996	Kazakhstan
1997	Ukraine
1998	Hungary
1999	Netherlands
2000	Hungary

== Summary of participation ==
52 championships

- In 1992, 1994, and 1995, Group C was played in two independent tiers, the results for the nations who were not given the opportunity to win Group C (known as Group C2) in those years are presented along with Group D/Division III.
- Division II teams (2001–present) are ranked one through twelve, with this chart assessing gold, silver, and bronze to the nations who ranked 29th, 30th, and 31st overall.

Team	Times	First	Last	Gold	Silver	Bronze	Total	Best finish (first/last)	Hosted^{[N2]}
Australia	27	1974	2025	0	4	3	7	2nd (2008/2018)	3
Austria	7	1963	1981	5	1	1	7	1st (1963/1981)	1
Belgium	33	1961	2025	0	3	3	6	2nd (2003/2015)	0
Belarus	2	1994	1995	1	1	0	2	1st (1994)	0
Bulgaria	43	1963	2026	0	1	4	5	2nd (1975)	5
China	31	1972	2022	1	6	4	11	1st (2022)	2
Chinese Taipei	3	2024	2026	0	0	0	0	11th (2024)	0
Croatia	14	2001	2024	4	1	5	10	1st (2005/2013/2024)	5
Denmark	20	1963	1991	1	3	5	9	1st (1991)	3
Estonia	8	1995	2014	4	0	2	6	1st (2002/2014)	2
France	16	1961	1985	1	2	2	5	1st (1985)	2
Georgia	5	2019	2025	0	0	0	0	8th (2022)	0
Great Britain	8	1971	1992	1	0	0	1	1st (1992)	1
Hungary	25	1963	2000	2	3	6	11	1st (1998/2000)	3
Ireland	2	2008	2011	0	0	0	0	12th (2008/2011)	0
Iceland	21	2001	2026	0	1	1	2	2nd (2014)	1
Israel	22	1993	2026	0	1	0	1	2nd (2005)	0
Italy	6	1966	1979	2	4	0	6	1st (1966/1977)	0
Japan	5	1967	1997	4	0	0	4	1st (1967/1987)	0
Kazakhstan	4	1993	1996	1	1	1	3	1st (1996)	0
Kyrgyzstan	1	2026		0	0	0	0	11th (2026)	0
Latvia	1	1993		1	0	0	1	1st (1993)	0
Lithuania	6	1997	2004	1	1	2	4	1st (2004)	1
Luxembourg	3	2002	2018	0	0	0	0	11th (2004)	0
Mexico	17	2001	2023	0	0	0	0	7th (2008)	2
Netherlands	16	1961	2025	7	2	0	9	1st (1978/2025)	3
Norway	3	1973	1986	3	0	0	3	1st (1973/1986)	0
New Zealand	18	2001	2026	0	0	0	0	4th (2011)	2
North Korea	20	1974	2019	0	1	0	1	2nd (1992)	0
Romania	18	1961	2017	8	2	3	13	1st (1961/2017)	5
South Africa	11	1961	2015	0	0	1	1	3rd (1966)	1
Serbia^{[N1]}	13	2007	2025	1	3	4	8	1st (2019)	4
Serbia and Montenegro^{[N1]}	9	1995	2006	0	0	1	1	3rd (2003)	2
Slovenia	5	1993	1997	0	1	1	2	2nd (1997)	2
South Korea	17	1979	2009	2	2	1	5	1st (2003/2009)	2
Spain	29	1977	2023	1	3	1	5	1st (2023)	10
Switzerland	2	1969	1974	1	1	0	2	1st (1974)	2
Slovakia	1	1994		1	0	0	1	1st (1994)	1
Thailand	1	2025		0	0	0	0		0
Turkey	9	2002	2024	0	0	0	0	11th (2002/2023)	2
Ukraine	5	1993	1997	1	2	2	5	1st (1997)	0
United Arab Emirates	3	2023	2025	0	0	2	2	3rd (2024/2025)	0
Yugoslavia^{[N1]}	7	1961	1990	2	3	1	6	1st (1979/1990)	2

- Note 1. The Federal Republic of Yugoslavia assumed the Socialist Federal Republic of Yugoslavia's position in Group C after a two-year absence in 1995. In 2003 it was reconstituted as the State Union of Serbia and Montenegro. After the state's dissolution, Serbia assumed their position in Division II, beginning play in 2007.
- Note 2. Both Poland and Sweden hosted a tournament at this level also.

== See also ==
- Ice Hockey World Championships
- IIHF World Championship Division I
- IIHF World Championship Division III
