= IIHF World Championship Division I =

Second tier of the IIHF World Championships

- Upcoming season or competition: 2027 IIHF World Championship Division I
- Sport: Ice hockey
- Founded: 1951 (Pool B); 2001 (Division I)
- No. of teams: 12
- Continent: Worldwide
- Most recent champions: Kazakhstan (Group A); Estonia (Group B)
- Most titles: Slovenia (Group A) (8 titles)
- Promotion to: Top Division
- Relegation to: Division II
- Website: IIHF.com

The IIHF World Championship Division I is an annual sports event organized by the International Ice Hockey Federation. The divisional championship is played in two groups.

== History ==
From 2001 until 2011 the two national teams that lost the relegation round at the IIHF World Championship were relegated to Division I for the following year's World Championships. At the Division I Championship, the winner of each group was promoted to the following year's IIHF World Championship, while the loser of each group was relegated to the Division II. Beginning in 2012, the last place team from each group in the world championship is relegated to Division I A, to be replaced by first and second place in Division I A. Sixth place in I A is relegated (now) to group I B, replaced by its winner, while sixth in I B is relegated to Division II.

The Division I World Championship was formed in 2001 from Pool B and the top four Pool C teams. Beginning in 2012 the two groups became tiered rather than parallel. Group A teams were the nations who either were relegated from the World Championship, or placed 2nd and 3rd in their 2011 groups. Group B was formed from the 4th and 5th placed teams, as well as the teams promoted from Division II. Japan qualified for group A because the IIHF council voted unanimously to allow Japan to maintain their seeded position (3rd) in their respective tournaments for 2012.

IIHF Annual Congress in Zurich for the 2026-2027 season, the International Ice Hockey Federation is implementing a major structural overhaul for the 2027-2028 season in the lower divisions. The most significant change is the merger of Division I/A and Division I/B. Division I will now function as a single, unified tier. The tournament will be organized into four groups (A, B, C, and D), hosted across two cities.

== Results ==
Year	Promoted		Relegated	
Year	To Top Division	To Division I A	To Division I B	To Division II
2001	Poland, Slovenia			Estonia, Lithuania
2002	Belarus, Denmark			China South Korea
2003	France, Kazakhstan			Croatia, Lithuania
2004	Belarus, Slovenia			Belgium, South Korea
2005	Italy, Norway			China, Romania
2006	Austria, Germany			Croatia, Israel
2007	France, Slovenia			China, Romania
2008	Austria, Hungary			Estonia, South Korea
2009	Italy, Kazakhstan			Australia, Romania
2010	Austria, Slovenia			Croatia, Serbia
2011	Italy, Kazakhstan			Estonia, Spain
2012	Slovenia, Austria	South Korea	Ukraine	Australia
2013	Kazakhstan, Italy	Ukraine	Great Britain	Estonia
2014	Slovenia, Austria	Poland	South Korea	Romania
2015	Kazakhstan, Hungary	South Korea	Ukraine	Netherlands
2016	Slovenia, Italy	Ukraine	Japan	Romania
2017	Austria, South Korea	Great Britain	Ukraine	Netherlands
2018	Great Britain, Italy	Lithuania	Poland	Croatia
2019	Kazakhstan, Belarus	Romania	Lithuania	Netherlands
2020	Cancelled due to the COVID-19 pandemic.			
2021	Cancelled due to the COVID-19 pandemic.			
2022	Slovenia, Hungary	Poland		
2023	Great Britain, Poland	Japan	Lithuania	Serbia
2024	Hungary, Slovenia	Ukraine	South Korea	Netherlands
2025	Great Britain, Italy	Lithuania	Romania	Croatia
2026	Kazakhstan, Ukraine	Estonia	Japan	Netherlands
2027				

== Pool B ==
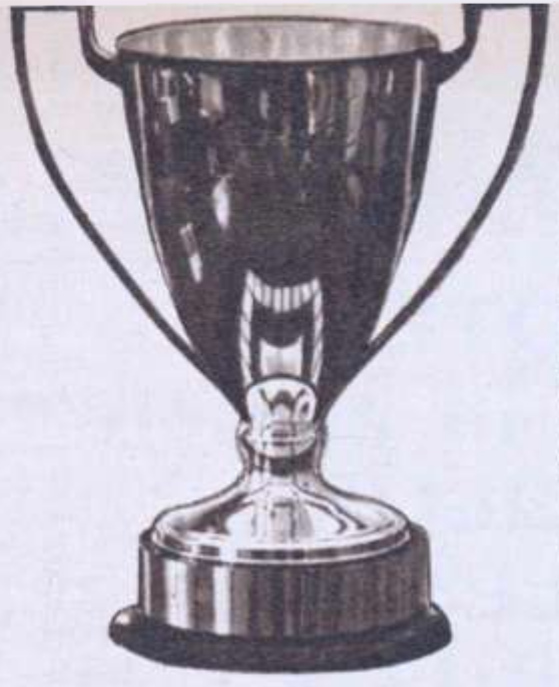
Ice Hockey World Champion Pool B trophy (1970s)

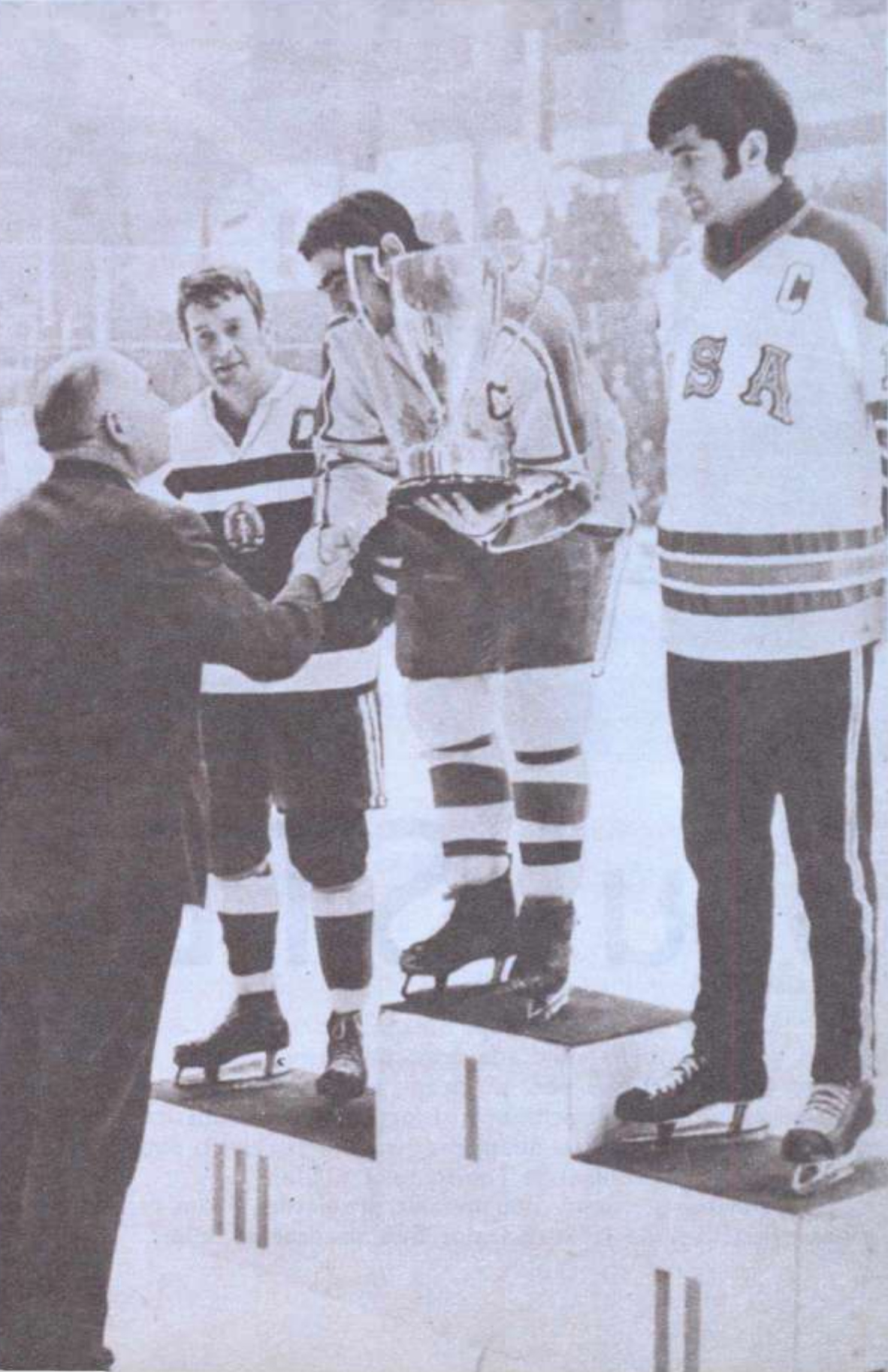
1972 Ice Hockey World Champion Pool B

=== Champions (1951–2000) ===
Year	National team
1951	Italy
1952	Great Britain
1953	Italy
1955	Italy
1956	East Germany
1959	Romania
1961	Norway
1962	Japan
1963	Norway
1964	Poland
1965	Poland
1966	West Germany
1967	Poland
1969	East Germany
1970	United States
1971	Switzerland
1972	Poland
1973	East Germany
1974	United States
1975	East Germany
1976	Romania
1977	East Germany
1978	Poland
1979	Netherlands
1981	Italy
1982	East Germany
1983	United States
1985	Poland
1986	Switzerland
1987	Poland
1989	Norway
1990	Switzerland
1991	Italy
1992	Austria
1993	Great Britain
1994	Switzerland
1995	Slovakia
1996	Latvia
1997	Belarus
1998	Ukraine
1999	Denmark
2000	Germany

== Summary of participation ==
60 championships

- Division I teams (2001–present) are ranked one through twelve, with this chart assessing gold, silver, and bronze to the nations who ranked 17th, 18th, and 19th overall.

Team	Times	First	Last	Gold	Silver	Bronze	Total	Best finish (first/last)	Hosted^{[N2]}
Australia	3	1962	2012	0	0	0	0	5th (1962)	0
Austria	34	1951	2017	4	7	5	16	1st (1992/2017)	5
Belgium	5	1951	2004	0	0	1	1	3rd (1956)	1
Belarus	5	1996	2019	2	2	1	5	1st (1997/2002)	0
Bulgaria	4	1970	1993	0	0	0	0	5th (1992)	0
China	14	1979	2026	0	0	0	0	6th (1982)	1
Croatia	12	2001	2025	0	0	0	0	8th (2001/2014)	1
Denmark	14	1949	2002	1	1	0	2	1st (1999)	2
Estonia	21	1998	2026	0	0	1	1	3rd (1998)	3
France	19	1951	2026	0	3	5	8	2nd (1951/2007)	4
Great Britain	32	1952	2025	5	3	2	10	1st (1952/2025)	2
East Germany	14	1956	1990	6	1	3	10	1st (1956/1982)	1
Germany^{[N1]}	9	1965	2006	3	2	2	7	1st (1966/2006)	1
Hungary	28	1959	2024	1	4	4	9	1st (2024)	6
Israel	1	2006	2006	0	0	0	0	12th (2006)	0
Italy	31	1951	2025	5	10	5	20	1st (1951/1991)	3
Japan	31	1962	2026	1	2	2	5	1st (1962)	4
Kazakhstan	15	1997	2026	7	3	3	12	1st (2003/2026)	1
Latvia	3	1994	1996	1	2	0	3	1st (1996)	0
Lithuania	21	2001	2026	1	0	2	3	3rd (2006/2022)	3
Netherlands	42	1951	2026	1	1	3	5	1st (1979)	6
Norway	27	1956	2005	4	4	4	12	1st (1963/2005)	2
Poland	45	1961	2026	6	8	7	21	1st (1965/1987)	7
Romania	37	1959	2026	2	2	2	6	1st (1959/1976)	4
Serbia	3	2010	2023	0	0	0	0	10th (2022)	0
Slovenia	15	1998	2024	7	3	1	11	1st (2001/2022)	6
Slovakia	1	1995	1995	1	0	0	1	1st (1995)	1
South Korea	16	2002	2026	0	1	1	2	2nd (2017)	1
Spain	4	2011	2026	0	0	0	0	10th (2011)	0
Switzerland	23	1961	1997	4	5	4	13	1st (1971/1990)	5
Ukraine	17	1998	2026	1	1	3	5	1st (1998)	3
United States	5	1970	1983	3	2	0	5	1st (1970/1983)	1
Yugoslavia	21	1951	1992	0	1	3	4	2nd (1974)	5

- Note 1. The Federal Republic of Germany competed as West Germany from 1953 until 1990.
- Note 2. Czechoslovakia, Sweden, and Finland each hosted this level on one occasion each.

== See also ==
- Ice Hockey World Championships
- IIHF World Championship Division II
- IIHF World Championship Division III
