= 2009 Men's Ice Hockey World Championships =

2009 edition of the Men's World Ice Hockey Championships

The 2009 Men's Ice Hockey World Championships was the 73rd such event hosted by the International Ice Hockey Federation. Teams representing 46 countries participated in four levels of competition. The competition also served as qualifications for division placements in the 2010 competition. In the Division I Championship held in April, Kazakhstan and Italy were promoted to the Championship division, while Australia and Romania were demoted to Division II. In the Division II competition, Serbia and South Korea were promoted, North Korea and South Africa were relegated to Division III. In the Division III competition, New Zealand and Turkey were promoted to Division II for 2009.

The 2009 IIHF World Championship was held in Switzerland between April 24 and May 10, 2009 with events being held in both Bern and Kloten. Russia won the championship with a 2–1 victory in the final against Canada.

== Championship ==
The Championship division was contested from April 24 to May 10, 2009. Participants in this tournament were placed into groups of four with the top three teams in each group advancing to the qualifying round. Teams which finished last in the group were sent to the relegation round where the top bottom teams were relegated to the 2010 Division I tournament. Within the qualifying round teams where split into two groups of six with the top four advancing to the playoff round and the bottom two eliminated from advancing. The playoff round was a knockout stage towards the gold medal game. The Championship was played in Bern and Kloten, Switzerland. Russia won the gold medal game, defeating Canada 2–1. Although Austria and Hungary were relegated to Division I for 2010. After being out of the Championship division for 70 years Hungary was promoted only to be demoted again for the 2010 competition.

Final standings

1. Russia
2. Canada
3. Sweden
4. United States
5. Finland
6. Czech Republic
7. Latvia
8. Belarus
9. Switzerland
10. Slovakia
11. Norway
12. France
13. Denmark
14. Austria — relegated to Division I for 2010
15. Germany*
16. Hungary — relegated to Division I for 2010

* Hosts of the 2010 WC, therefore exempt from relegation.

== Division I ==
Division I was contested from April 11 to April 17, 2009. Participants in this tournament were separated into two separate tournament groups. The Group A tournament was contested in Vilnius, Lithuania. Group B's games were played in Toruń, Poland. Kazakhstan and Italy finished atop of Group A and Group B respectively, gaining promotion to the 2010 Championship division. Although Australia finished last in Group A and Romania last in Group B and were relegated to Division II for 2010.

Final standings

Group A

1. Kazakhstan — promoted to Championship pool for 2010
2. Slovenia
3. Japan
4. Lithuania
5. Croatia
6. Australia — relegated to Division II for 2010

Group B

1. Italy — promoted to Championship pool for 2010
2. Ukraine
3. Great Britain
4. Poland
5. Netherlands
6. Romania — relegated to Division II for 2010

== Division II ==
Division II was contested from April 6 to April 13, 2009. Participants in this tournament were separated into two separate tournament groups. The Group A tournament was contested in Novi Sad, Serbia. Group B's games were played in Sofia, Bulgaria. Serbia and South Korea finished atop of Group A and Group B respectively, gaining promotion to Division I for 2010. Although North Korea finished last in Group A and South Africa last in Group B and were relegated to Division III for 2010.

Final standings

Group A

1. Serbia — promoted to Division I for 2010
2. Estonia
3. China
4. Iceland
5. Israel
6. North Korea — relegated to Division III for 2010

Group B

1. South Korea — promoted to Division I for 2010
2. Belgium
3. Spain
4. Bulgaria
5. Mexico
6. South Africa — relegated to Division III for 2010

== Division III ==
Division III was contested from April 10 to April 16, 2009 in Dunedin, New Zealand. New Zealand won the championship and gained promotion, along with Turkey, into the 2010 Division II tournament.

Final standings

1. New Zealand — promoted to Division II for 2010
2. Turkey — promoted to Division II for 2010
3. Luxembourg
4. Greece
5. Ireland
6. Mongolia

== See also ==
- The 32nd World Junior Ice Hockey Championships was held in 2009 in Ottawa, Ontario, Canada.
- The 11th World U18 Championships was held in Fargo, North Dakota and Moorhead, Minnesota, United States.
- The 12th Women's World Ice Hockey Championships was held in Hämeenlinna, Finland.
- The 2nd World Women's U18 Championship was held in Füssen, Germany.
