= 2009 World Ice Hockey Championships =

2009 World Ice Hockey Championships may refer to:

- 2009 Men's World Ice Hockey Championships
- 2009 Women's World Ice Hockey Championships
- 2009 World Junior Ice Hockey Championships
- 2009 IIHF World U18 Championships
