= 2027 IIHF World Championship Division II =

Tournament details
- Host countries: United Arab Emirates; Kyrgyzstan
- Venues: 2 (in 2 host cities)
- Dates: TBD
- Teams: 12

The 2027 IIHF World Championship Division II consists of two international ice hockey tournaments organized by the International Ice Hockey Federation. Divisions II A and II B represent the fourth and the fifth tier of the IIHF Ice Hockey World Championships.

This will mark the first year that the format is changed from having a single group with a round-robin, to a two-group group stage with three teams per group. The teams play the teams from the other group once. The top two placed teams qualify for the semifinals, which will be played against the team from the same group. The winners move on to the final to determine the promoted team. Third-placed teams from both groups face each other in a two-legged tie to play out the relegated team.

== Group A tournament ==
2026 IIHF World Championship Division II A
Tournament details
- Host country: United Arab Emirates
- City: Al Ain
- Venue: 1 (in 1 host city)
- Teams: 7

The tournament will be played in Al Ain, United Arab Emirates.

=== Participants ===
As the 2026 II A tournament was cancelled, this tournament will be played with seven teams after Israel was promoted.

Team	Qualification
Croatia	Placed 6th in Division I B in 2025 and were relegated.
Serbia	Placed 2nd in Division II A in 2025.
United Arab Emirates	Host, placed 3rd in Division II A in 2025.
Belgium	Placed 4th in Division II A in 2025.
Australia	Placed 5th in Division II A in 2025.
Georgia	Placed 1st in Division II B in 2025 and were promoted.
Israel	Placed 1st in Division II B in 2026 and were promoted.

=== Standings ===
Pos	Team	Pld	W	OTW	OTL	L	GF	GA	GD	Pts	Promotion or relegation
1	Croatia	0	0	0	0	0	0	0	0	0	Promoted to 2028 Division I B
2	Serbia	0	0	0	0	0	0	0	0	0	
3	United Arab Emirates (H)	0	0	0	0	0	0	0	0	0	
4	Belgium	0	0	0	0	0	0	0	0	0	
5	Australia	0	0	0	0	0	0	0	0	0	
6	Georgia	0	0	0	0	0	0	0	0	0	Relegated to 2028 Division II B
7	Israel	0	0	0	0	0	0	0	0	0	Relegated to 2028 Division II B

First match(es) will be played: 2027. Source:
Rules for classification: 1) points; 2) head-to-head points; 3) head-to-head goal difference; 4) head-to-head number of goals scored; 5) result against closest best-ranked team outside tied teams; 6) result against second-best ranked team outside tied teams; 7) seeding before tournament.
(H) Host

== Group B tournament ==
2027 IIHF World Championship Division II B
Tournament details
- Host country: Kyrgyzstan
- City: Bishkek
- Venue: 1 (in 1 host city)
- Dates: TBD
- Teams: 5

The tournament will be played in Bishkek, Kyrgyzstan.

=== Participants ===
As the 2026 II A tournament was cancelled, this year will feature five teams as Israel was promoted.

Team	Qualification
New Zealand	Placed 2nd in Division II B in 2026.
Iceland	Placed 3rd in Division II B in 2026.
Bulgaria	Placed 4th in Division II B in 2026.
Kyrgyzstan	Host, placed 5th in Division II B in 2026.
Turkey	Placed 6th in Division III A in 2026 was promoted.

=== Standings ===
Pos	Team	Pld	W	OTW	OTL	L	GF	GA	GD	Pts	Promotion
1	New Zealand	0	0	0	0	0	0	0	0	0	Promoted to 2028 Division II A
2	Iceland	0	0	0	0	0	0	0	0	0	
3	Bulgaria	0	0	0	0	0	0	0	0	0	
4	Kyrgyzstan (H)	0	0	0	0	0	0	0	0	0	
5	Turkey	0	0	0	0	0	0	0	0	0	

First match(es) will be played: 2027. Source:
Rules for classification: 1) points; 2) head-to-head points; 3) head-to-head goal difference; 4) head-to-head number of goals scored; 5) result against closest best-ranked team outside tied teams; 6) result against second-best ranked team outside tied teams; 7) seeding before tournament.
(H) Host
