= 2020 IIHF World Championship Division II =

Tournament details
- Host countries: Croatia; Iceland
- Venues: 2 (in 2 host cities)
- Dates: 19–25 April (cancelled)
- Teams: 12

The 2020 IIHF World Championship Division II was an international ice hockey tournament run by the International Ice Hockey Federation.

The Group A tournament would have been held in Zagreb, Croatia and the Group B tournament in Reykjavík, Iceland from 19 to 25 April 2020.

Both tournaments were cancelled on 13 March 2020 due to the COVID-19 pandemic.

== Group A tournament ==
2020 IIHF World Championship Division II A

Tournament details
- Host country: Croatia
- Venue: 1 (in 1 host city)
- Dates: 19–25 April (cancelled)
- Teams: 6

Official website
- Website

=== Participants ===
Team	Qualification
Netherlands	Placed 6th in Division I B previous year and was relegated.
Croatia	Host, placed 2nd in Division II A previous year.
Australia	Placed 3rd in Division II A previous year.
Spain	Placed 4th in Division II A previous year.
China	Placed 5th in Division II A previous year.
Israel	Placed 1st in Division II B previous year and was promoted.

=== Match officials ===
Four referees and seven linesmen are selected for the tournament.

Referees	Linesmen
(Austria) Miroslav Stolc; (Estonia) Maksim Toode; (Finland) Jukka-Pekka Koistinen; (Germany) Benjamin Hoppe	(Austria) David Nothegger; (Croatia) Tomislav Grozaj; (Croatia) Krešimir Polašek; (Czech Republic) Tomáš Brejcha; (Japan) Naoki Sawayama; (Serbia) David Perduv; (Slovakia) Matúš Stanzel

=== Standings ===
Pos	Team	Pld	W	OTW	OTL	L	GF	GA	GD	Pts	Qualification or relegation
1	Netherlands	0	0	0	0	0	0	0	0	0	Promotion to 2021 Division I B
2	Croatia (H)	0	0	0	0	0	0	0	0	0	
3	Australia	0	0	0	0	0	0	0	0	0	
4	Spain	0	0	0	0	0	0	0	0	0	
5	China	0	0	0	0	0	0	0	0	0	
6	Israel	0	0	0	0	0	0	0	0	0	Relegation to 2021 Division II B

Source: N/A
Rules for classification: 1) points; 2) head-to-head points; 3) head-to-head goal difference; 4) head-to-head number of goals scored; 5) result against closest best-ranked team outside tied teams; 6) result against second-best ranked team outside tied teams; 7) seeding before tournament.
(H) Host

=== Results ===
All times are local (UTC+2).

19 April 2020; 13:00	Israel	Cancelled	Spain	Dom Sportova, Zagreb

19 April 2020; 16:30	Australia	Cancelled	Netherlands	Dom Sportova, Zagreb

19 April 2020; 20:00	Croatia	Cancelled	China	Dom Sportova, Zagreb

20 April 2020; 13:00	Netherlands	Cancelled	Spain	Dom Sportova, Zagreb

20 April 2020; 16:30	China	Cancelled	Israel	Dom Sportova, Zagreb

20 April 2020; 20:00	Croatia	Cancelled	Australia	Dom Sportova, Zagreb

22 April 2020; 13:00	Netherlands	Cancelled	China	Dom Sportova, Zagreb

22 April 2020; 16:30	Australia	Cancelled	Spain	Dom Sportova, Zagreb

22 April 2020; 20:00	Croatia	Cancelled	Israel	Dom Sportova, Zagreb

24 April 2020; 13:00	China	Cancelled	Australia	Dom Sportova, Zagreb

24 April 2020; 16:30	Israel	Cancelled	Netherlands	Dom Sportova, Zagreb

24 April 2020; 20:00	Spain	Cancelled	Croatia	Dom Sportova, Zagreb

25 April 2020; 13:00	Australia	Cancelled	Israel	Dom Sportova, Zagreb

25 April 2020; 16:30	Spain	Cancelled	China	Dom Sportova, Zagreb

25 April 2020; 20:00	Netherlands	Cancelled	Croatia	Dom Sportova, Zagreb

== Group B tournament ==
2020 IIHF World Championship Division II B

Tournament details
- Host country: Iceland
- Venue: 1 (in 1 host city)
- Dates: 19–25 April (cancelled)
- Teams: 6

Official website
- Website

=== Participants ===
Team	Qualification
Belgium	Placed 6th in Division II A previous year and was relegated.
Iceland	Host, placed 2nd in Division II B previous year.
New Zealand	Placed 3rd in Division II B previous year.
Georgia	Placed 4th in Division II B previous year.
Mexico	Placed 5th in Division II B previous year.
Bulgaria	Placed 1st in Division III previous year and was promoted.

=== Match officials ===
Four referees and seven linesmen are selected for the tournament.

Referees	Linesmen
(Denmark) Martin Christensen; (Japan) Kenji Kosaka; (Malaysia) Lim Yong Chun; (Norway) Christian Persson	(Austria) Jakob Schauer; (China) Liu Tiange; (Iceland) Oli Gunnarsson; (Iceland) Sindri Gunnarsson; (Iceland) Leon Hafsteinsson; (Slovakia) Martin Jobbágy; (Sweden) Anders Nyqvist

=== Standings ===
Pos	Team	Pld	W	OTW	OTL	L	GF	GA	GD	Pts	Qualification or relegation
1	Belgium	0	0	0	0	0	0	0	0	0	Promotion to 2021 Division II A
2	Iceland	0	0	0	0	0	0	0	0	0	
3	New Zealand	0	0	0	0	0	0	0	0	0	
4	Georgia	0	0	0	0	0	0	0	0	0	
5	Mexico	0	0	0	0	0	0	0	0	0	
6	Bulgaria	0	0	0	0	0	0	0	0	0	Relegation to 2021 Division III A

Source: N/A
Rules for classification: 1) points; 2) head-to-head points; 3) head-to-head goal difference; 4) head-to-head number of goals scored; 5) result against closest best-ranked team outside tied teams; 6) result against second-best ranked team outside tied teams; 7) seeding before tournament.

=== Results ===
All times are local (UTC+2).

19 April 2020; 13:00	Bulgaria	Cancelled	Georgia	Laugardalur Arena, Reykjavík

19 April 2020; 16:30	New Zealand	Cancelled	Belgium	Laugardalur Arena, Reykjavík

19 April 2020; 20:00	Iceland	Cancelled	Mexico	Laugardalur Arena, Reykjavík

20 April 2020; 13:00	Belgium	Cancelled	Georgia	Laugardalur Arena, Reykjavík

20 April 2020; 16:30	Mexico	Cancelled	Bulgaria	Laugardalur Arena, Reykjavík

20 April 2020; 20:00	Iceland	Cancelled	New Zealand	Laugardalur Arena, Reykjavík

22 April 2020; 13:00	New Zealand	Cancelled	Georgia	Laugardalur Arena, Reykjavík

22 April 2020; 16:30	Belgium	Cancelled	Mexico	Laugardalur Arena, Reykjavík

22 April 2020; 20:00	Iceland	Cancelled	Bulgaria	Laugardalur Arena, Reykjavík

24 April 2020; 13:00	Mexico	Cancelled	New Zealand	Laugardalur Arena, Reykjavík

24 April 2020; 16:30	Bulgaria	Cancelled	Belgium	Laugardalur Arena, Reykjavík

24 April 2020; 20:00	Georgia	Cancelled	Iceland	Laugardalur Arena, Reykjavík

25 April 2020; 13:00	New Zealand	Cancelled	Bulgaria	Laugardalur Arena, Reykjavík

25 April 2020; 16:30	Georgia	Cancelled	Mexico	Laugardalur Arena, Reykjavík

25 April 2020; 20:00	Belgium	Cancelled	Iceland	Laugardalur Arena, Reykjavík
