= 2010 IIHF World Championship Division II =

Tournament details
- Host countries: Mexico; Estonia
- Venue(s): 2 (in 2 host cities)
- Dates: 11–17 April 2010 (A); 10–16 April 2010 (B)
- Teams: 12

The 2010 IIHF World Championship Division II was a pair of international ice hockey tournaments organized by the International Ice Hockey Federation. The tournaments were contested between 10 and 17 April 2010. Participants in this championship were drawn into two separate tournament groups. The Group A tournament was contested in Naucalpan, Mexico. Group B's games were played in Narva, Estonia. Spain and Estonia won Group A and Group B, respectively, to earn promotion to Division I at the 2011 IIHF World Championship. Meanwhile, Turkey and Israel finished last in Group A and B and were relegated to Division III for 2011. These four teams were replaced by Serbia and Croatia, which were relegated from Division I, and Ireland and North Korea which earned promotion from Division III.

== Group A ==
The Group A tournament was played in Naucalpan, Mexico, from 11 to 17 April 2010.

=== Participating teams ===
Team	Qualification
Australia	Placed 6th in Division I Group A last year and were relegated
Belgium	Placed 2nd in Division II Group B last year
Spain	Placed 3rd in Division II Group B last year
Bulgaria	Placed 4th in Division II Group B last year
Mexico	Hosts; placed 5th in Division II Group B last year
Turkey	Placed 2nd in Division III last year and were promoted

=== Final standings ===
Pos	Team	Pld	W	OTW	OTL	L	GF	GA	GD	Pts	Promotion or relegation
1	Spain	5	5	0	0	0	35	7	+28	15	Promoted to the 2011 Division I
2	Australia	5	4	0	0	1	31	15	+16	12	
3	Belgium	5	3	0	0	2	26	18	+8	9	
4	Bulgaria	5	2	0	0	3	28	31	−3	6	
5	Mexico (H)	5	1	0	0	4	17	21	−4	3	
6	Turkey	5	0	0	0	5	8	53	−45	0	Relegated to the 2011 Division III

Source: IIHF
(H) Host

=== Match results ===
All times are local.

11 April 2010; 13:00	Spain	6–0 (2–0, 1–0, 3–0)	Australia	Lomas Verdes; Attendance: 640

Game reference

Ander Alcaine
Goalies
Matthew Ezzy
Referee:
(United States) Shane Warschaw

1:13 – Martin	1 – 0
6:15 – Munoz (Barnola, Perez) (PP)	2 – 0
28:01 – Munoz	3 – 0
41:04 – Betran (Pedraz)	4 – 0
46:53 – Munoz (Pedraz)	5 – 0
52:14 – Munoz (Betran)	6 – 0

43 min
Penalties
20 min
59
Shots
55

11 April 2010; 16:30	Turkey	3–12 (0–4, 2–2, 1–6)	Bulgaria	Lomas Verdes; Attendance: 750

Game reference

Baris Ucele
Cagil Uyar
Goalies
Konstantin Mihaylov
Referee:
(Japan) Kimmo Hokkanen

	0 – 1	6:23 – Muhachov (Asenov) (PP)
	0 – 2	8:29 – Yotov (Muhachov) (PP)
	0 – 3	9:58 – Hadzhitonev (Boyadjiev)
	0 – 4	19:37 – Muhachov
25:50 – Ozmen (Coskun)	1 – 4
	1 – 5	26:27 – Hadzhitonev (Boyadjiev)
37:40 – Ozturk (Yapicilar) (PP)	2 – 5
	2 – 6	39:31 – Asenov (Yotov, Muhachov)
43:53 – Tasdemir (Baykan)	3 – 6
	3 – 7	46:41 – Hadzhitonev (Boyadjiev, Giurov)
	3 – 8	49:34 – Yotov (Mladenov, Muhachov)
	3 – 9	52:29 – Slavchev
	3 – 10	57:30 – Boyadjiev
	3 – 11	59:09 – Morgunov (Muhachov)
	3 – 12	59:45 – Yotov (Muhachov, Morgunov)

22 min
Penalties
14 min
81
Shots
71

11 April 2010; 20:00	Belgium	5–2 (2–1, 2–0, 1–1)	Mexico	Lomas Verdes; Attendance: 2400

Game reference

Bjorn Steijlen
Kevin van Looveren
Goalies
Andres de la Garma
Referee:
(Canada) Graham Skilliter

0:36 – M. Morgan (V. Morgan, Peussens)	1 – 0
1:24 – V. Camelbeeck (Kolodziejczyk)	2 – 0
	2 – 1	7:16 – Cervantes (Arroyo) (PP2)
36:57 – Peussens (M. Morgan, V. Morgan)	3 – 1
38:08 – Gyesbreghs (Engelen)	4 – 1
	4 – 2	44:16 – Ortega (Sierra)
48:28 – van Buren (V. Camelbeeck)	5 – 2

30 min
Penalties
12 min
47
Shots
47

12 April 2010; 13:00	Australia	11–4 (3–0, 6–3, 2–1)	Bulgaria	Lomas Verdes; Attendance: 100

Game reference

Anthony Kimlin
Goalies
Todor Petkov, Konstantin Mihaylov
Referee:
(Slovenia) Igor Dremelj

5:34 – Darge (Powell) (PP)	1 – 0
5:56 – T. Stephenson (Villani, S. Stephenson)	2 – 0
12:57 – Webster (Wilson, Franchini) (PP)	3 – 0
24:09 – Darge (Franchini)	4 – 0
26:45 – Webster	5 – 0
27:41 – Darge (Wilson, Powell)	6 – 0
28:39 – Bourke (Beaton, Delsar)	7 – 0
	7 – 1	29:39 – Yotov (Stefanov)
33:17 – Webster (Starke, Wilson) (PP2)	8 – 1
	8 – 2	33:44 – Muhachov (Yotov, Morgunov) (SH)
35:23 – Beaton (Delsar, Bourke) (PP)	9 – 2
	9 – 3	36:49 – Boyadjiev (Mladenov, Vasilev)
42:03 – Franchini (Darge, Powell)	10 – 3
	10 – 4	51:39 – Muhachov (Yotov, Stoev)
54:30 – Oddy (Sekura, Webster)	11 – 4

16 min
Penalties
34 min
67
Shots
38

12 April 2010; 16:30	Belgium	1–6 (0–0, 1–2, 0–4)	Spain	Lomas Verdes; Attendance: 200

Game reference

Bjorn Steijlen
Kevin van Looveren
Goalies
Ander Alcaine
Referee:
(Japan) Kimmo Hokkanen

	0 – 1	22:05 – Betran (J. Munoz, Pedraz)
26:07 – van Buren (Steijnen, Gyesbreghs) (PP)	1 – 1
	1 – 2	31:42 – Parra (Perez) (PP)
	1 – 3	50:31 – J. Munoz
	1 – 4	54:19 – J. Munoz (Pedraz)
	1 – 5	54:51 – Echevarria (Brabo)
	1 – 6	56:52 – Pedraz (Betran, J. Munoz) (PP)

46 min
Penalties
12 min
25
Shots
36

12 April 2010; 20:00	Mexico	9–2 (2–1, 3–1, 4–0)	Turkey	Lomas Verdes; Attendance: 1000

Game reference

Alfonso de Alba
Goalies
Baris Ucele
Referee:
(United States) Shane Warschaw

15:20 – Chabat (Arroyo, Ugarte) (PP)	1 – 0
	1 – 1	17:19 – Akturk (Kosemen, Solak) (PP)
18:25 – Cervantes (PP)	2 – 1
21:07 – Ortega (Arroyo) (PP)	3 – 1
24:49 – Cervantes (Arroyo) (PP2)	4 – 1
29:49 – Sierra (de la Vega) (PP2)	5 – 1
	5 – 2	35:24 – Tasdemir (Coskun) (PP)
47:25 – Arroyo (de la Vega, Ugarte) (PP)	6 – 2
57:10 – Cervantes (Chabat)	7 – 2
57:27 – Arroyo (Sierra)	8 – 2
57:35 – Ortega (Arroyo, Sierra)	9 – 2

32 min
Penalties
104 min
47
Shots
26

14 April 2010; 13:00	Belgium	13–1 (3–1, 6–0, 4–0)	Turkey	Lomas Verdes; Attendance: 100

Game reference

Kevin van Looveren
Goalies
Baris Ucele
Referee:
(Japan) Kimmo Hokkanen

1:58 – Raekelboom (Camelbeeck, van Buren) (PP)	1 – 0
11:52 – Vercammen	2 – 0
	2 – 1	13:30 – Gumus (Ozturk)
15:34 – V. Morgan (Lipsonen, Peussens)	3 – 1
20:26 – M. Morgan (V. Morgan, Peussens)	4 – 1
24:21 – M. Morgan (Peussens, Lipsonen)	5 – 1
25:29 – van Buren (Steijnen, Kolodziejczyk)	6 – 1
29:16 – van Buren (Camelbeeck, Raekelboom)	7 – 1
31:07 – Vroemans (Peussens, van Buren) (PP)	8 – 1
34:27 – Steijnen (Camelbeeck, Vos) (PP)	9 – 1
45:07 – M. Morgan (V. Morgan, Peussens)	10 – 1
46:05 – Kolodziejczyk (Steijnen)	11 – 1
51:32 – Lipsonen (M. Morgan, V. Morgan) (PP)	12 – 1
53:40 – Raekelboom (Steijnen, van Buren) (PP)	13 – 1

8 min
Penalties
34 min
73
Shots
14

14 April 2010; 16:30	Spain	10–3 (3–2, 1–0, 6–1)	Bulgaria	Lomas Verdes; Attendance: 200

Game reference

Ander Alcaine
Goalies
Konstantin Mihaylov
Referee:
(Canada) Graham Skilliter

4:35 – J. Munoz (Pedraz, Boronat) (PP)	1 – 0
	1 – 1	16:21 – Yotov (Stefanov)
	1 – 2	17:13 – Asenov (Muhachov, Yotov) (PP)
17:29 – P. Munoz (Echevarria, Barnola)	2 – 2
18:46 – Pedraz (J. Munoz, Betran)	3 – 2
28:25 – Barnola (Brabo, Echevarria)	4 – 2
47:38 – P. Munoz (Echevarria, Barnola)	5 – 2
	5 – 3	49:15 – Muhachov
51:35 – Parra (J. Munoz)	6 – 3
56:30 – Echevarria (P. Munoz, Barnola) (PP)	7 – 3
58:44 – Parra (Betran, J. Munoz) (SH)	8 – 3
58:58 – Ribot-Tona	9 – 3
59:47 – Parra (PS)	10 – 3

30 min
Penalties
26 min
68
Shots
21

14 April 2010; 20:00	Australia	5–2 (3–1, 0–0, 2–1)	Mexico	Lomas Verdes; Attendance: 2000

Game reference

Matthew Ezzy
Goalies
Alfonso de Alba
Referee:
(Slovenia) Igor Dremelj

4:54 – Oddy (Wilson) (PP)	1 – 0
11:51 – Peterson (Powell)	2 – 0
	2 – 1	15:05 – Glennie (Cervantes, Ugarte) (PP)
16:25 – Huxley (Oddy)	3 – 1
	3 – 2	48:47 – Arroyo (M. Sierra, Rosette)
50:37 – Webster	4 – 2
55:32 – Darge (Powell, Franchini)	5 – 2

18 min
Penalties
24 min
24
Shots
37

16 April 2010; 13:00	Bulgaria	4–5 (1–3, 3–1, 0–1)	Belgium	Lomas Verdes; Attendance: 150

Game reference

Konstantin Mihyalov
Goalies
Kevin van Looveren
Referee:
(Slovenia) Igor Dremelj

	0 – 1	6:48 – van Buren (Steijnen, Raekelboom)
	0 – 2	10:06 – Gyesbreghs (M. Morgan, V. Morgan) (PP)
17:39 – Yotov	1 – 2
	1 – 3	18:11 – van Buren (Steijnen, Raekelboom)
27:35 – Yotov (Muhachov, Morgunov) (PP)	2 – 3
34:05 – Asenov (Yotov, Muhachov) (PP)	3 – 3
	3 – 4	36:06 – van Buren
38:31 – Muhachov	4 – 4
	4 – 5	53:08 – M. Morgan (V. Morgan, Paulus) (PP)

51 min
Penalties
12 min
15
Shots
51

16 April 2010; 16:30	Turkey	1–10 (0–3, 0–4, 1–3)	Australia	Lomas Verdes; Attendance: 500

Game reference

Baris Ucele
Goalies
Anthony Kimlin
Referee:
(Canada) Graham Skilliter

	0 – 1	0:55 – Webster (Oddy)
	0 – 2	7:26 – Powell (Franchini, Peterson)
	0 – 3	11:54 – Webster (Oddy, Huxley)
	0 – 4	21:42 – Webster (Wilson)
	0 – 5	22:58 – Wilson (S. Stephenson, T. Stephenson) (PP)
	0 – 6	29:43 – S. Stephenson (Beaton, T. Stephenson)
	0 – 7	34:19 – Powell (S. Stephenson, Huxley)
	0 – 8	45:21 – Bourke (SH)
49:32 – Gumus (PP)	1 – 8
	1 – 9	54:19 – Delsar (Beaton, Price) (PP)
	1 – 10	59:40 – Bourke

14 min
Penalties
18 min
22
Shots
49

16 April 2010; 20:00	Mexico	2–4 (0–1, 1–1, 1–2)	Spain	Lomas Verdes; Attendance: 3000

Game reference

Andres de la Garma
Goalies
Ander Alcaine
Referee:
(United States) Shane Warschaw

	0 – 1	6:58 – Brabo (Martin) (PP)
	0 – 2	Munoz (Betran, Pedraz)
39:40 – Ugarte (Cervantes, Arroyo) (PP)	1 – 2
45:07 – Ortega	2 – 2
	2 – 3	51:26 – Perez (Martin)
	2 – 4	59:54 – Martin (EN)

16 min
Penalties
68 min
35
Shots
26

17 April 2010; 13:00	Australia	5–2 (3–1, 2–0, 0–1)	Belgium	Lomas Verdes; Attendance: 200

Game reference

Matthew Ezzy
Goalies
Kevin van Looveren
Referee:
(Canada) Graham Skillitier

3:45 – T. Stephenson (S. Stephenson, Villani)	1 – 0
5:53 – Sekura (Oddy, Webster) (PP)	2 – 0
10:21 – Franchini (Darge, Powell)	3 – 0
	3 – 1	13:13 – V. Morgan (Engelen)
29:02 – T. Stephenson (S. Stephenson, Villani)	4 – 1
32:02 – T. Stephenson (Manco)	5 – 1
	5 – 2	54:36 – M. Morgan (Gyesbreghs)

6 min
Penalties
4 min
37
Shots
54

17 April 2010; 16:30	Spain	9–1 (6–0, 1–0, 2–1)	Turkey	Lomas Verdes; Attendance: 500

Game reference

Jose Luis Alonso
Goalies
Baris Ucele
Referee:
(Slovenia) Igor Dremelj

7:42 – Betran (Munoz, Pedraz)	1 – 0
8:19 – Perez (Martin, Brabo)	2 – 0
8:49 – Valle (Matrin, Perez)	3 – 0
10:19 – Munoz (Pedraz, Parra)	4 – 0
14:51 – Boronat (Ribot-Tona, Vazquez)	5 – 0
16:08 – Munoz (Echevarria, Roshchyn)	6 – 0
34:33 – Munoz (Pedraz, Boronat)	7 – 0
	7 – 1	44:24 – Solak (Halil, Aktepe)
44:57 – Munoz (Pedraz, Betran)	8 – 1
54:43 – Boronat (Vazquez)	9 – 1

8 min
Penalties
16 min
56
Shots
28

17 April 2010; 20:00	Bulgaria	5–2 (4–1, 0–0, 1–1)	Mexico	Lomas Verdes; Attendance: 3000

Game reference

Konstantin Mihaylov
Goalies
Andres de la Garma
Referee:
(Japan) Kimmo Hokkanen

	0 – 1	5:08 – Arroyo (Ortega, Miller)
6:29 – Yotov (Kanchev)	1 – 1
12:29 – Asenov (Vasilev, Yotov) (PP)	2 – 1
15:03 – Muhachov (Yotov, Asenov)	3 – 1
19:46 – Boyadjiev (Hadzhitonev)	4 – 1
	4 – 2	48:20 – Arroyo (Ortega, M. Sierra)
59:24 – Slavchev (EN)	5 – 2

16 min
Penalties
10 min
23
Shots
52

=== Tournament awards ===
Best players selected by the directorate

- Best Goaltender: Andres de la Garma Mexico (82 saves from 92 shots on goal)
- Best Forward: Juan Munoz Spain (10 goals, 6 assists)
- Best Defenceman: Anthony Wilson Australia (1 goal, 5 assists)

=== Scoring leaders ===
List shows the top skaters sorted by points, then goals.

Player	GP	G	A	Pts	+/−	PIM
(Spain) Juan Muñoz	5	10	6	16	+13	4
(Bulgaria) Alexei Yotov	5	8	7	15	+10	12
(Bulgaria) Stanislav Muhachov	5	7	8	15	+9	6
(Spain) Alejandro Pedraz	5	2	10	12	+11	0
(Mexico) Brian Arroyo	5	5	6	11	0	2
(Belgium) Sven van Buren	5	7	3	10	+3	14
(Australia) Lliam Webster	5	7	2	9	+5	12
(Belgium) Mitch Morgan	5	6	3	9	+6	6
(Spain) Adrian Betran	5	3	6	9	+15	2
(Belgium) Vincent Morgan	5	2	7	8	+5	6

GP = Games played; G = Goals; A = Assists; Pts = Points; +/− = Plus/minus; PIM = Penalties in minutes; POS = Position
Source: IIHF.com

=== Leading goalkeepers ===
Only the top five goalkeepers, based on save percentage, who have played 40% of their team's minutes are included in this list.

Player	TOI	SA	GA	GAA	Sv%	SO
(Spain) Ander Alcaine	240:00	136	6	1.50	95.59	1
(Australia) Matthew Ezzy	180:00	150	10	3.33	93.33	0
(Australia) Anthony Kimlin	120:00	120	5	2.50	91.67	0
(Bulgaria) Konstantin Mihailov	271:21	270	24	5.31	91.11	0
(Mexico) Andres de la Garma	178:09	94	12	4.04	87.23	0

TOI = Time On Ice (minutes:seconds); SA = Shots against; GA = Goals against; GAA = Goals against average; Sv% = Save percentage; SO = Shutouts
Source: IIHF.com

== Group B ==
The Group B tournament was played in Narva, Estonia, from 10 to 16 April 2010.

=== Participating teams ===
Team	Qualification
Romania	Placed 6th in Division I Group B last year and were relegated
Estonia	Hosts; placed 2nd in Division II Group A last year
China	Placed 3rd in Division II Group A last year
Iceland	Placed 4th in Division II Group A last year
Israel	Placed 5th in Division II Group A last year
New Zealand	Placed 1st in Division III last year and were promoted

=== Final standings ===
Pos	Team	Pld	W	OTW	OTL	L	GF	GA	GD	Pts	Promotion or relegation
1	Estonia (H)	5	5	0	0	0	62	5	+57	15	Promoted to the 2011 Division I
2	Romania	5	4	0	0	1	47	14	+33	12	
3	Iceland	5	3	0	0	2	16	18	−2	9	
4	New Zealand	5	2	0	0	3	9	39	−30	6	
5	China	5	1	0	0	4	12	26	−14	3	
6	Israel	5	0	0	0	5	11	55	−44	0	Relegated to the 2011 Division III

Source: IIHF
(H) Host

=== Match results ===
All times are local.

10 April 2010; 13:00	New Zealand	1–3 (0–0, 0–2, 1–1)	Iceland	Kreenholm Ice Hall; Attendance: 128

Game reference

Zak Nothling
Goalies
Dennis Hedstrom
Referee:
(Poland) Pawel Meszynski

	0 – 1	24:54 – Magnusson (Gislason)
	0 – 2	33:37 – Jonsson (Alengaarde)
44:17 – Huber (SH)	1 – 2
	1 – 3	57:32 – Magnusson

10 min
Penalties
14 min
29
Shots
38

10 April 2010; 16:30	China	3–4 (2–0, 1–1, 0–3)	Romania	Kreenholm Ice Hall; Attendance: 253

Game reference

Xue Liu
Goalies
Adrian Catrinoi Cornea
Referee:
(Netherlands) Ruud van Baast

4:10 – Fu (Chen, Yin) (PP)	1 – 0
11:49 – Jiang (Cui, Fu)	2 – 0
22:06 – Chen (Cui, Fu) (PP)	3 – 0
	3 – 1	33:38 – C. Nagy (Hozo, Kosa)
	3 – 2	43:43 – Moldovan (L. Peter, Kosa)
	3 – 3	49:26 – Virag (Molnar, Z. Antal)
	3 – 4	50:00 – Hozo (Szocs, Adorjan)

12 min
Penalties
10 min
28
Shots
48

10 April 2010; 20:00	Estonia	17–3 (5–0, 4–2, 8–1)	Israel	Kreenholm Ice Hall; Attendance: 852

Game reference

Villem-Henrik Koitmaa
Goalies
Avihu Sorotzki
Boris Amromin
Referee:
(Latvia) Andris Ansons

3:31 – Makrov (Petrov, Suur) (PP)	1 – 0
4:27 – Suur (Titarenko)	2 – 0
6:44 – Titarenko (Nekrassov, Semjonov) (PP)	3 – 0
11:31 – Titarenko (Nekrassov, Suur)	4 – 0
12:26 – Kolpakov (Sibirtsev, Kaljuste)	5 – 0
	5 – 1	20:50 – Frenkel (Sherbatov, Korotin)
23:00 – Sibirtsev (Sorokin)	6 – 1
24:33 – Nekrassov (Semjonov)	7 – 1
	7 – 2	32:15 – Sherbatov (Norman)
35:45 – Sorokin (Nekrassov) (SH)	8 – 2
36:31 – Suur (Makrov, Sildre) (SH)	9 – 2
42:28 – Titarenko (Kolpakov, Semjonov)	10 – 2
44:02 – Petrov (Ivanov, Pankov)	11 – 2
48:51 – Ivanov (Suur)	12 – 2
	12 – 3	52:10 – Norman (Nemenoff, Frenkel)
52:30 – Makrov (Ossipov)	13 – 3
52:48 – Ivanov (Makrov, Petrov)	14 – 3
53:18 – Petrov (Makrov, Ivanov)	15 – 3
56:43 – Suur	16 – 3
59:46 – Sorokin (Makrov, Suur)	17 – 3

8 min
Penalties
6 min
97
Shots
16

11 April 2010; 13:00	Romania	8–3 (2–0, 2–1, 4–2)	Iceland	Kreenholm Ice Hall; Attendance: 88

Game reference

Adrian Catrinoi Cornea
Goalies
Dennis Hedstrom
Referee:
(Poland) Pawel Meszynski

5:15 – Virag	1 – 0
8:56 – Virag (Antal)	2 – 0
29:57 – Antal (Molnar, Virag)	3 – 0
31:43 – Goga (L. Peter)	4 – 0
	4 – 1	39:03 – R. Hedstrom (Magnusson, Alengaard) (PP)
42:36 – I. Nagy (Molnar)	5 – 1
43:56 – Zsok (Basilidesz, Mihaly)	6 – 1
	6 – 2	45:35 – Alengaard (Maack)
	6 – 3	52:36 – Thormodsson (Magnusson) (PP)
55:10 – Molnar (Hozo)	7 – 3
59:49 – Papp (Mihaly, Zsok)	8 – 3

24 min
Penalties
20 min
59
Shots
23

11 April 2010; 16:30	Israel	4–5 (0–1, 3–3, 1–1)	New Zealand	Kreenholm Ice Hall

Game reference

Avihu Sorotzki
Goalies
Zak Nothling
Referee:
(Netherlands) Ruud van Baast

	0 – 1	19:39 – Huber (Eaden, Speirs)
23:20 – Sherbatov (Belo, Frenkel)	1 – 1
24:43 – Spivak (Sherbatov, Levy) (PP)	2 – 1
26:07 – Revniaga (Norman, Belo)	3 – 1
	3 – 2	30:20 – Wannamaker (Down, Huber)
	3 – 3	33:36 – Wannamaker (Hay, Haines)
	3 – 4	39:33 – Eaden (Speirs, Idoine)
47:47 – Frenkel (Levy, Sherbatov)	4 – 4
	4 – 5	52:50 – Eaden (Speirs, Huber)

10 min
Penalties
10 min
40
Shots
49

11 April 2010; 20:00	Estonia	15–0 (5–0, 6–0, 4–0)	China	Kreenholm Ice Hall; Attendance: 1267

Game reference

Mark Rajevski
Goalies
Xue Liu
Referee:
(Denmark) Asger Krog

2:15 – Nekrassov (Titarenko, Semjonov)	1 – 0
2:35 – Makrov (Ossipov)	2 – 0
10:27 – Petrov (Makrov, Ivanov)	3 – 0
12:16 – Makrov (Kolpakov)	4 – 0
16:43 – Makrov (Petrov)	5 – 0
20:51 – Makrov (Ivanov, Suur) (PP)	6 – 0
22:02 – Rooba (SH)	7 – 0
24:28 – Ivanov (Makrov, Petrov)	8 – 0
29:16 – Suur (Petrov, Ivanov) (PP)	9 – 0
37:43 – Semjonov (Sildre, Titarenko) (PP)	10 – 0
39:43 – Makrov (Suur) (PP)	11 – 0
46:43 – Suur (Petrov) (PP)	12 – 0
50:35 – Ossipov	13 – 0
53:14 – Petrov (Makrov, Suur)	14 – 0
54:14 – Ossipov (PP)	15 – 0

18 min
Penalties
32 min
71
Shots
21

13 April 2010; 13:00	Romania	20–0 (7–0, 8–0, 5–0)	Israel	Kreenholm Ice Hall; Attendance: 87

Game reference

Rajmond Fulop
Goalies
Avihu Sorotzki
Boris Amromin
Referee:
(Denmark) Asger Krog

4:06 – Virag (I. Antal, Molnar)	1 – 0
5:05 – Szocs (Basildesz) (SH)	2 – 0
8:53 – Molnar (Z. Antal, I, Antal)	3 – 0
10:34 – Basilidesz	4 – 0
12:29 – Timaru (Moldovan) (SH)	5 – 0
18:04 – Z. Antal (Szocs) (SH)	6 – 0
19:27 – Gliga (R. Peter, I Nagy)	7 – 0
22:37 – Timaru (L. Peter, Moldovan)	8 – 0
23:09 – Z. Antal (Adorjan)	9 – 0
25:52 – Basilidesz (Zsok, Mihaly) (PP)	10 – 0
26:26 – Moldovan (Adorjan, L. Peter)	11 – 0
29:39 – C. Nagy (Adorjan, I. Antal)	12 – 0
36:01 – Gliga	13 – 0
37:48 – Moldovan (I. Nagy)	14 – 0
39:34 – I. Antal (Virag)	15 – 0
41:15 – Mihaly	16 – 0
43:57 – Virag (Adorjan)	17 – 0
45:07 – Gliga (R. Peter) (PP)	18 – 0
46:03 – Basilidesz (Zsok) (PP)	19 – 0
48:48 – R. Peter (Gliga, Hozo)	20 – 0

14 min
Penalties
22 min
90
Shots
14

13 April 2010; 16:30	China	1–3 (0–0, 0–1, 1–2)	Iceland	Kreenholm Ice Hall; Attendance: 134

Game reference

Xue Liu
Goalies
Dennis Hedstrom
Referee:
(Latvia) Andris Ansons

	0 – 1	38:40 – Gislason (Aedel)
	0 – 2	45:34 – Mikaelsson (Alengaard)
	0 – 3	48:22 – Alengaard (Hedstrom, Jonsson) (PP2)
54:27 – Yin (Li, Cui) (PP)	1 – 3

49 min
Penalties
26 min
27
Shots
49

13 April 2010; 20:00	Estonia	17–0 (3–0, 8–0, 6–0)	New Zealand	Kreenholm Ice Hall

Game reference

Mark Rajevski
Goalies
Zak Nothling
Referee:
(Poland) Pawel Meszynski

1:41 – Semjonov (Titarenko) (PP)	1 – 0
3:40 – Makrov (Petrov)	2 – 0
12:10 – Nekrassov (Ossipov, Titarenko)	3 – 0
29:13 – Kolpakov (Semjonov, Karik)	4 – 0
31:30 – Petrov (Makrov, Ossipov) (PP)	5 – 0
32:08 – Kaljuste (Suvaoja)	6 – 0
32:28 – Makrov (Semjonov, Suur)	7 – 0
34:02 – Nekrassov (Kolpakov)	8 – 0
34:59 – Rooba (Makrov, Ossipov)	9 – 0
39:17 – Semjonov (Sildre, Pankov)	10 – 0
39:33 – Pankov (Karik)	11 – 0
43:48 – Suvaoja (Kolpakov)	12 – 0
53:30 – Suvaoja (Semjonov, Suur)	13 – 0
54:38 – Semjonov (Sibrtsev)	14 – 0
55:08 – Nekrassov (Rooba)	15 – 0
55:47 – Nekrassov (Karik, Rooba)	16 – 0
59:13 – Makrov (Suur) (PP)	17 – 0

16 min
Penalties
18 min
88
Shots
22

14 April 2010; 13:00	Israel	2–7 (2–2, 0–1, 0–4)	China	Kreenholm Ice Hall; Attendance: 104

Game reference

Avihu Sorotzki
Goalies
Ming Xie
Referee:
(Poland) Pawel Meszynski

8:44 – Sherbatov (Frenkel) (PP)	1 – 0
	1 – 1	10:38 – Guo (Lang, Wang)
11:24 – Frenkel (Spivak)	2 – 1
	2 – 2	13:28 – Cui (L. Chen, Li) (PP)
	2 – 3	37:43 – Yin (Qu)
	2 – 4	41:48 – Fu (Li, Cui)
	2 – 5	55:45 – Li (Wang)
	2 – 6	56:44 – Wang (L. Chen, Z. Chen) (PP)
	2 – 7	57:44 – Yin (Fu, Li)

16 min
Penalties
20 min
31
Shots
40

14 April 2010; 16:30	New Zealand	1–14 (0–2, 1–8, 0–4)	Romania	Kreenholm Ice Hall; Attendance: 147

Game reference

Zak Nothling
Goalies
Adrian Catrinoi Cornea
Rajmond Fulop
Referee:
(Latvia) Andris Ansons

	0 – 1	3:04 – Molnar (PS)
	0 – 2	4:17 – Mihaly (Moldovan, Adorjan)
	0 – 3	21:07 – R. Peter (Z. Antal, Hozo)
	0 – 4	23:06 – C. Nagy (Moldovan, L. Peter)
	0 – 5	23:25 – Timaru (C. Nagy, L. Peter)
23:44 – Speirs (Eaden, Down)	1 – 5
	1 – 6	25:54 – Timaru (L. Peter, Virag)
	1 – 7	27:33 – Molnar (Virag, C. Nagy)
	1 – 8	28:58 – Mihaly (Moldovan)
	1 – 9	32:27 – Virag (I. Antal, Z. Antal)
	1 – 10	38:07 – Mihaly (Zsok, Badilidesz)
	1 – 11	43:25 – Mihaly (Adorjan, Fulop)
	1 – 12	45:57 – Gliga (R. Peter, I. Nagy)
	1 – 13	48:44 – Timaru (I. Antal) (PP)
	1 – 14	51:45 – R. Peter (Szocs, Gliga)

8 min
Penalties
10 min
19
Shots
57

14 April 2010; 20:00	Iceland	1–6 (1–3, 0–1, 0–2)	Estonia	Kreenholm Ice Hall; Attendance: 683

Game reference

Aevar Bjornsson
Goalies
Mark Rajevski
Referee:
(Netherlands) Ruud van Baast

	0 – 1	6:15 – Rooba (Sorokin) (SH)
7:20 – Hedstrom (Mikaelsson, Alengaard) (PP)	1 – 1
	1 – 2	16:01 – Titarenko (Makrov, Suur) (PP)
	1 – 3	19:54 – Sildre (Suur, Makrov)
	1 – 4	24:55 – Makrov (Sildre, Petrov)
	1 – 5	51:02 – Sildre (Makrov, Petrov)
	1 – 6	54:04 – Sorokin (Makrov, Sildre) (PP)

12 min
Penalties
10 min
28
Shots
59

16 April 2010; 13:00	China	1–2 (0–1, 1–0, 0–1)	New Zealand	Kreenholm Ice Hall; Attendance: 83

Game reference

Ming Xie
Goalies
Zak Nothling
Referee:
(Netherlands) Ruud van Baast

	0 – 1	4:54 – Huber (Haines, Eden)
33:00 – Wang (Zhang, Chen) (PP)	1 – 1
	1 – 2	47:40 – Speirs (Eaden, Down) (PP2)

6 min
Penalties
31 min
35
Shots
21

16 April 2010; 16:30	Iceland	6–2 (3–0, 1–2, 2–0)	Israel	Kreenholm Ice Hall; Attendance: 97

Game reference

Dennis Hedstrom
Goalies
Avihu Sorotzki
Referee:
(Poland) Pawel Meszynski

0:17 – Alengaard (Mikaelsson)	1 – 0
7:09 – Alengaard (Jonsson)	2 – 0
19:36 – Alengaard	3 – 0
	3 – 1	20:38 – Frenkel (Levy, Avneri)
	3 – 2	31:32 – Frenkel (Korotin)
37:27 – Alengaard (Arnason) (PP)	4 – 2
43:38 – R. Hedstrom (Alengaard)	5 – 2
55:07 – R. Hedstrom (Alengaard, Mikaelsson) (PP)	6 – 2

12 min
Penalties
18 min
48
Shots
26

16 April 2010; 20:00	Romania	1–7 (0–2, 1–4, 0–1)	Estonia	Kreenholm Ice Hall

Game reference

Adrian Catrinoi Cornea
Rajmond Fulop
Goalies
Mark Rajevski
Referee:
(Denmark) Asger Krog

	0 – 1	9:59 – Makrov (Ivanov)
	0 – 2	17:16 – Makrov (Ivanov)
	0 – 3	22:55 – Petrov (Suur, Makrov) (PP)
	0 – 4	23:05 – Semjonov (Sildre)
	0 – 5	23:21 – Makrov (Ivanov, Petrov)
	0 – 6	30:01 – Ivanov (Petrov)
36:33 – Hozo (R. Peter, Szocs) (PP)	1 – 6
	1 – 7	53:57 – Nekrassov (Kolpakov)

24 min
Penalties
37 min
18
Shots
49

=== Tournament awards ===
Best players selected by the directorate

- MVP: Andrei Makrov Estonia
- Best Goaltender: Mark Rajevski Estonia (87 saves from 89 shots on goal)
- Best Forward: Andrei Makrov Estonia (14 goals, 14 assists, 53 shots)
- Best Defenceman: Dmitri Suur Estonia (5 goals, 13 assists, 27 shots)

=== Scoring leaders ===
List shows the top skaters sorted by points, then goals.

Player	GP	G	A	Pts	+/−	PIM
(Estonia) Andrei Makrov	5	14	14	28	+21	12
(Estonia) Dmitri Suur	5	5	13	18	+17	2
(Estonia) Aleksandr Petrov	5	6	11	17	+19	4
(Iceland) Emil Alengaard	5	6	6	12	+1	8
(Estonia) Maksim Ivanov	5	4	8	12	+14	6
(Estonia) Anton Nekrassov	5	8	3	11	+13	0
(Estonia) Maksim Semjonov	5	4	7	11	+14	2
(Romania) Csanad Virag	5	6	4	10	+11	12
(Estonia) Vassili Titarenko	5	4	5	9	+8	0
(Israel) Sergei Frenkel	5	5	3	8	−12	6
(Romania) Ede Mihaly	5	5	3	8	+8	4

GP = Games played; G = Goals; A = Assists; Pts = Points; +/− = Plus/minus; PIM = Penalties in minutes; POS = Position
Source: IIHF.com

=== Leading goalkeepers ===
Only the top five goalkeepers, based on save percentage, who have played 40% of their team's minutes are included in this list.

Player	TOI	SA	GA	GAA	Sv%	SO
(Estonia) Mark Rajevski	240:00	89	2	0.50	97.75	2
(China) Xie Ming	120:00	52	4	2.00	92.31	0
(Iceland) Dennis Hedstrom	240:00	141	12	3.00	91.49	0
(Romania) Adrian Catrinoi Cornea	188:29	101	12	3.82	88.12	0
(China) Liu Xue	180:00	168	22	7.33	86.90	0

TOI = Time On Ice (minutes:seconds); SA = Shots against; GA = Goals against; GAA = Goals against average; Sv% = Save percentage; SO = Shutouts
Source: IIHF.com
