= New Zealand men's national ice hockey team =

New Zealand
- Nickname: Ice Blacks
- Association: New Zealand Ice Hockey Federation
- General manager: Neil Carey
- Head coach: Andrew Spiller
- Assistants: Guillaume Leclancher; Anton Purver
- Captain: Stefan Amston
- Most games: Andrew Hay (74)
- Top scorer: Andrew Cox (30)
- Most points: Andrew Cox (50)
- Team colors
- IIHF code: NZL

Ranking
- Current IIHF: 42 (3 June 2026)
- Highest IIHF: 35 (2013)
- Lowest IIHF: 42 (2022–23)

First international
- South Korea 35–2 New Zealand (Perth, Australia; 13 March 1987)

Biggest win
- New Zealand 19–0 Hong Kong (Perth, Australia; 15 March 1987)

Biggest defeat
- Australia 58–0 New Zealand (Perth, Australia; 14 March 1987)

IIHF World Championships
- Appearances: 31 (first in 1987)
- Best result: 27th (1987)

International record (W–L–T)
- 58–87–2

The New Zealand men's national ice hockey team is the national ice hockey team for New Zealand. As of 2024, the New Zealand team is ranked 41st in the IIHF World Rankings. The official nickname of New Zealand's national ice hockey team is the Ice Blacks. The "Ice Blacks" nickname is one of many national team nicknames related to the All Blacks.

== History ==
The 2016 documentary film "Ice Blacks" covers the history of the team, their rivalry with Australia and their difficulties in competing at international level because of New Zealand's geographic distance from the rest of the traditional ice hockey playing countries.

New Zealand has competed in the Division II World Championships since 2001. From 2007 to 2011, New Zealand was coached by Jeff Bonazzo. In his last year coaching at the 2011 Division II World Championships, New Zealand won three games and lost two, finishing second in their group behind host nation and rival Australia and missing promotion to Division I.

New Zealand hosted the 2003 IIHF World Championship Division III, which was held in Auckland. The Ice Blacks finished first and captured their first gold medal and were promoted to Division II.

New Zealand hosted the 2006 IIHF World Championship Division II Group B, which was held in Auckland. The Ice Blacks finished last and were relegated to Division III.

New Zealand hosted the 2009 IIHF World Championship Division III, which was held in Dunedin. The Ice Blacks finished first and captured their third gold medal by winning all five games and were promoted to Division II.

New Zealand hosted the 2017 IIHF World Championship Division II Group B, which was held in Auckland. The Ice Blacks finished second behind China, capturing their fourth silver medal.

New Zealand hosted the 2025 IIHF World Championship Division II Group B, which was held in Dunedin.

== Tournament record ==
=== New Zealand Winter Games ===
Games	GP	W	OTW/SOW	OTL/SOL	L	GF	GA	Coach	Captain	Rank
2009 Winter Games	2	1	0	0	1	7	12	Jeff Bonazzo	Simon Glass	2nd
2011 Winter Games	4	2	0	0	2	17	16	Jeff Bonazzo	Corey Down	2nd
2017 Winter Games	3	1	0	1	1	7	6	Maru Rout	Berton Haines	2nd
2018 Winter Games	3	2	0	0	1	13	9	Anatoly Khorozov	Paris Heyd	1st

=== World Championship record ===
- 1987 – 27th place (3rd in "Pool D")
- 1989 – 29th place (5th in "Pool D")
- 1995 – 39th place (10th in "Pool C2")
- 1996 – Not ranked (2nd in "Pool D" group 1 qualifier)
- 1997 – Not ranked (2nd in unofficial "Pool E")
- 1998 – 38th place (6th in "Pool D")
- 1999 – 38th place (6th in "Pool D")
- 2000 – 39th place (6th in "Pool D")
- 2001 – 39th place (5th in Division II Group A)
- 2002 – 43rd place (3rd in Division II qualification)
- 2003 – 41st place (1st in Division III)
- 2004 – 37th place (5th in Division II Group B)
- 2005 – 38th place (5th in Division II Group A)
- 2006 – 39th place (6th in Division II Group B)
- 2007 – 41st place (1st in Division III)
- 2008 – 39th place (6th in Division II Group B)
- 2009 – 41st place (1st in Division III)
- 2010 – 36th place (4th in Division II Group B)
- 2011 – 32nd place (2nd in Division II Group A)
- 2012 – 34th place (6th in Division II Group A)
- 2013 – 36th place (2nd in Division II Group B)
- 2014 – 37th place (3rd in Division II Group B)
- 2015 – 36th place (2nd in Division II Group B)
- 2016 – 38th place (4th in Division II Group B)
- 2017 – 36th place (2nd in Division II Group B)
- 2018 – 36th place (2nd in Division II Group B)
- 2019 – 37th place (3rd in Division II Group B)
- 2020 – Cancelled due to the COVID-19 pandemic
- 2021 – Cancelled due to the COVID-19 pandemic
- 2022 – Withdrawn due to the COVID-19 pandemic
- 2023 – 38th place (4th in Division II Group B)
- 2024 – 36th place (2nd in Division II Group B)
- 2025 – 37th place (3rd in Division II Group B)
- 2026 – 36th place (2nd in Division II Group B)

== All-time record against other nations ==
As of 12 April 2026

Opponent	Played	Won	Drawn	Lost	GF	GA
Australia	36	7	0	29	67	250
Belgium	5	1	0	4	9	41
Bulgaria	10	5	0	5	57	60
China	9	5	0	4	33	35
Chinese Taipei	4	4	0	0	29	5
Croatia	3	0	0	3	8	45
Estonia	2	0	0	2	2	36
Georgia	3	2	0	1	12	9
Great Britain	1	0	0	1	0	26
Greece	4	3	0	1	22	16
Hong Kong	2	2	0	0	38	0
Iceland	8	0	0	8	14	39
Ireland	2	2	0	0	13	2
Israel	9	5	0	4	38	41
Kyrgyzstan	1	1	0	0	5	4
Lithuania	1	0	0	1	2	21
Luxembourg	5	5	0	0	32	9
Mexico	12	7	1	4	47	31
Mongolia	2	2	0	0	15	1
North Korea	8	4	0	4	42	38
Romania	2	0	0	2	2	66
Serbia	3	0	0	3	6	43
South Africa	13	3	1	9	38	56
South Korea	6	0	0	6	5	99
Spain	7	0	0	7	12	89
Thailand	1	1	0	0	7	1
Turkey	11	10	0	1	65	30
United Arab Emirates	1	0	0	1	1	7
Total	171	69	2	100	621	1100

== All-time record against other clubs ==
As of 15 April 2019

Opponent	Played	Won	Drawn	Lost	Win %	For	Aga	Diff
Canada Moose	11	6	2	3	54.55%	42	26	+16
(Italy) SG Cortina	1	0	0	1	0.00%	4	15	−11
(Italy) Cavalese All Stars	1	0	0	1	0.00%	3	5	−2
(Italy) HC Fassa	1	0	0	1	0.00%	4	10	−6
Australia Selects	4	1	0	3	25.00%	10	24	−14
(New Zealand) Southern Stampede	2	0	0	2	0.00%	6	9	−3
(Australia) Perth Thunder	3	1	0	2	33.33%	11	17	−6
(Canada) Calgary Flames Alumni	1	0	0	1	0.00%	2	9	−7
(Australia) Melbourne Mustangs	2	0	0	2	0.00%	8	10	−2
(Australia) Melbourne Ice	2	1	0	1	50.00%	10	3	+7
(United States) Vail Yeti	2	1	0	1	50.00%	11	14	−3
Total	30	10	2	18	30.00%	111	142	-32
