= 1987 Ice Hockey World Championships =

1987 edition of the World Ice Hockey Championships

Tournament details
- Host country: Austria
- Venues: 2 (in 1 host city)
- Dates: 17 April – 3 May
- Teams: 8

Final positions
- Champions: Sweden (4th title)
- Runners-up: Soviet Union
- Third place: Czechoslovakia
- Fourth place: Canada

Tournament statistics
- Games played: 40
- Goals scored: 282 (7.05 per game)
- Attendance: 205,401 (5,135 per game)
- Scoring leader: (Soviet Union) Vladimir Krutov 15 points

The 1987 Ice Hockey World Championships was the 52nd such event hosted by the International Ice Hockey Federation. It was also the 63rd European Championships. Teams representing 28 countries participated in four levels of competition.

In the Division A Championship held 17 April to 3 May in Vienna, Austria, each team played each other once in the preliminary round. The four best placed teams then played each other once in a championship round and, unlike the relegation round, the first round of results were not counted. Sweden won the gold medal for the fourth time and the Soviet Union won their 25th European title. In the European Championships, only the games of the first round between European teams counted. Switzerland was demoted to Division B.

Sweden's victory was a controversial one. The Germans had beaten both Canada and Finland when it was revealed that forward Miroslav Sikora had played for the Polish junior team in 1977. He was suspended, and the IIHF stripped West Germany of their two wins. The Germans took the matter to court, stating that they had been granted permission. Though Sikora remained suspended, the IIHF reinstated the two victories. If the courts had not intervened, Finland would have replaced Sweden in the medal round. Additionally, the Swedes earned the Gold over the Soviets by goal differential when the Soviets had gone undefeated and the Swedes had lost three preliminary round games. This led to further discussion of a change of format. The IIHF's account of the finale states that, "Sweden won thanks to an inflated score against Canada," however Sweden only needed to win by two (the same margin that the Czechoslovaks beat Canada by) for the Gold. In reality, the Soviets had to come from behind to capture Silver and deprive the Czechoslovaks of the Gold, and the Swedes winning by more than two ensured that the Czechoslovaks could not play to a tie and capture Gold.

Promotion and relegation was effective for 1989 as the IIHF did not run a championship in Olympic years at this time. Nations that did not participate in the Calgary Olympics were invited to compete in the final Thayer Tutt Trophy.

== World Championship Group A (Austria) ==
=== First round ===
Pos	Team	Pld	W	D	L	GF	GA	GD	Pts
1	Soviet Union	7	7	0	0	48	12	+36	14
2	Czechoslovakia	7	5	1	1	24	15	+9	11
3	Sweden	7	4	0	3	30	17	+13	8
4	Canada	7	3	1	3	25	17	+8	7
5	West Germany	7	3	0	4	18	28	−10	6
6	Finland	7	3	0	4	17	24	−7	6
7	United States	7	2	0	5	19	36	−17	4
8	Switzerland	7	0	0	7	17	49	−32	0

17 April	Soviet Union	13–5	Switzerland	Wiener Stadhalle; Attendance: 2,944

17 April	Sweden	3–0	West Germany	Wiener Stadhalle; Attendance: 4,000

17 April	Finland	2–5	Czechoslovakia

17 April	Canada	3–1	United States

18 April	Finland	3–2	Switzerland

18 April	United States	2–6	Sweden

18 April	West Germany	0–7	Soviet Union	Donauparkhalle; Attendance: 3,151

18 April	Czechoslovakia	1–1	Canada

20 April	Finland	1–3	West Germany

20 April	Soviet Union	11–2	United States

20 April	Canada	6–1	Switzerland	Donauparkhalle; Attendance: 2,203

20 April	Sweden	2–3	Czechoslovakia

21 April	West Germany	5–3	Canada

21 April	Sweden	12–1	Switzerland

21 April	United States	2–5	Finland	Donauparkhalle; Attendance: 1731

21 April	Czechoslovakia	1–6	Soviet Union

23 April	Soviet Union	4–0	Finland

23 April	United States	6–4	West Germany

23 April	Switzerland	2–5	Czechoslovakia	Donauparkhalle; Attendance: 2,600

23 April	Sweden	4–3	Canada

24 April	Finland	4–1	Sweden

24 April	Canada	2–3	Soviet Union

25 April	Switzerland	3–6	United States

25 April	West Germany	2–5	Czechoslovakia

26 April	Canada	7–2	Finland

26 April	Soviet Union	4–2	Sweden

27 April	Switzerland	3–4	West Germany

27 April	Czechoslovakia	4–2	United States

=== Final Round ===
Pos	Team	Pld	W	D	L	GF	GA	GD	Pts
1	Sweden	3	1	2	0	14	5	+9	4
2	Soviet Union	3	1	2	0	4	3	+1	4
3	Czechoslovakia	3	1	1	1	8	7	+1	3
4	Canada	3	0	1	2	2	13	−11	1

29 April	Soviet Union	0–0	Canada

29 April	Czechoslovakia	3–3	Sweden

1 May	Czechoslovakia	4–2	Canada

1 May	Sweden	2–2	Soviet Union

3 May	Canada	0–9	Sweden

3 May	Soviet Union	2–1	Czechoslovakia

=== Consolation round ===
Pos	Team	Pld	W	D	L	GF	GA	GD	Pts
5	Finland	10	5	1	4	32	34	−2	11
6	West Germany	10	4	1	5	31	37	−6	9
7	United States	10	4	0	6	36	49	−13	8
8	Switzerland	10	0	0	10	26	71	−45	0

Switzerland was relegated to Group B.

28 April	West Germany	8–1	Switzerland

28 April	Finland	6–4	United States

30 April	Finland	7–4	Switzerland

30 April	United States	6–3	West Germany

2 May	Switzerland	4–7	United States

2 May	West Germany	2–2	Finland

== World Championship Group B (Italy) ==
Played in Canazei 26 March to 5 April. The top three teams earned Olympic berths, and the fourth place team played off against the Group C winner to join them.

Pos	Team	Pld	W	D	L	GF	GA	GD	Pts
9	Poland	7	6	0	1	39	11	+28	12
10	Norway	7	5	1	1	33	25	+8	11
11	Austria	7	5	0	2	41	27	+14	10
12	France	7	4	1	2	37	26	+11	9
13	East Germany	7	2	2	3	25	31	−6	6
14	Italy	7	2	1	4	28	30	−2	5
15	Netherlands	7	1	1	5	30	37	−7	3
16	China	7	0	0	7	14	60	−46	0

Poland was promoted to Group A, and both the Netherlands and China were relegated to Group C.

26 March	France	5–5	Norway

26 March	Italy	7–3	China

27 March	Austria	6–5	France

27 March	Poland	14–0	China

27 March	East Germany	6–6	Netherlands

28 March	Norway	6–2	East Germany

28 March	Italy	8–6	Netherlands

29 March	Poland	5–1	Norway

29 March	China	3–11	Austria

29 March	Italy	1–3	France

30 March	Austria	6–4	Netherlands

30 March	East Germany	2–1	Poland

31 March	China	2–4	Norway

31 March	Netherlands	3–5	France

31 March	Italy	5–5	East Germany

1 April	Poland	6–2	France

1 April	Austria	3–5	Norway

2 April	Netherlands	0–3	Poland

2 April	East Germany	5–1	China

2 April	Italy	1–4	Austria

3 April	East Germany	2–5	France

3 April	Norway	7–4	Netherlands

4 April	France	12–3	China

4 April	Poland	6–4	Austria

4 April	Italy	4–5	Norway

5 April	China	2–7	Netherlands

5 April	Austria	7–3	East Germany

5 April	Italy	2–4	Poland

== World Championship Group C (Denmark) ==
Played in Copenhagen, Herlev and Hørsholm 20–29 March. In addition to being promoted, the winner played off against the fourth placed Group B team for the final Olympic berth.

Pos	Team	Pld	W	D	L	GF	GA	GD	Pts
17	Japan	7	5	1	1	61	13	+48	11 (Note: Japan, Denmark, and Romania were tied with 2 head-to-head points each, and were ranked on head-to-head goal difference: Japan (+4), Denmark (0), and Romania (–4))
18	Denmark	7	5	1	1	47	23	+24	11
19	Romania	7	5	1	1	48	22	+26	11
20	Yugoslavia	7	3	4	0	60	23	+37	10
21	Hungary	7	3	0	4	33	28	+5	6
22	North Korea	7	2	0	5	13	45	−32	4
23	Bulgaria	7	1	1	5	21	40	−19	3
24	Belgium	7	0	0	7	8	97	−89	0

Notes:

Both Japan and Denmark were promoted to Group B. On the final day, if either Romania or Yugoslavia had won, they would have been promoted, but they tied each other. Belgium was relegated to Group D, and later Romania chose to compete in Group D as well, for financial reasons.

20 March	Bulgaria	3–7	Romania

20 March	Japan	24–0	Belgium

20 March	Yugoslavia	6–2	Hungary

20 March	Denmark	9–1	North Korea

21 March	Japan	11–2	Bulgaria

21 March	Romania	19–1	Belgium

22 March	North Korea	2–8	Yugoslavia

22 March	Hungary	4–6	Denmark

23 March	Romania	5–3	Japan

23 March	Belgium	0–6	Bulgaria

23 March	Hungary	9–3	North Korea

23 March	Denmark	6–6	Yugoslavia

25 March	Romania	7–1	North Korea

25 March	Bulgaria	3–3	Yugoslavia

25 March	Japan	3–1	Hungary

25 March	Belgium	1–8	Denmark

26 March	Yugoslavia	5–5	Japan

26 March	Hungary	9–4	Belgium

26 March	North Korea	3–2	Bulgaria

26 March	Romania	2–8	Denmark

28 March	Romania	4–2	Hungary

28 March	Belgium	1–28	Yugoslavia

28 March	Japan	9–0	North Korea

28 March	Bulgaria	3–10	Denmark

29 March	North Korea	3–1	Belgium

29 March	Yugoslavia	4–4	Romania

29 March	Hungary	6–2	Bulgaria

29 March	Denmark	0–6	Japan

== World Championship Group D (Australia) ==
Played in Perth, Western Australia 13–20 March. Chinese Taipei also played four games as exhibition contests. They lost 31–3 to Australia, 24–0 to South Korea, 12–1 to New Zealand, and tied Hong Kong 2–2.

Pos	Team	Pld	W	D	L	GF	GA	GD	Pts
25	Australia	6	5	1	0	177	6	+171	11
26	South Korea	6	4	1	1	130	16	+114	9
27	New Zealand	6	2	0	4	42	143	−101	4
28	Hong Kong	6	0	0	6	1	185	−184	0

Australia was promoted to Group C. Later, when Romania declined to travel to Australia for the 1989 World Ice Hockey Championships Group C for financial reasons, South Korea was promoted to take their place.

13 March	Australia	37–0	Hong Kong

13 March	South Korea	35–2	New Zealand

14 March	Australia	58–0	New Zealand

14 March	South Korea	44–0	Hong Kong

15 March	New Zealand	19–0	Hong Kong

15 March	Australia	7–2	South Korea

17 March	Australia	42–0	Hong Kong

17 March	South Korea	21–2	New Zealand

18 March	Australia	29–0	New Zealand

18 March	South Korea	24–1	Hong Kong

20 March	Australia	4–4	South Korea

20 March	New Zealand	19–0	Hong Kong

== Ranking and statistics ==
1987 IIHF World Championship winners

Sweden
4th title

=== Tournament Awards ===
- Best players selected by the directorate:
  - Best Goaltender: (Czechoslovakia) Dominik Hašek
  - Best Defenceman: (Canada) Craig Hartsburg
  - Best Forward: (Soviet Union) Vladimir Krutov
- Media All-Star Team:
  - Goaltender: (Czechoslovakia) Dominik Hašek
  - Defence: (West Germany) Udo Kiessling, (Soviet Union) Viacheslav Fetisov
  - Forwards: (Soviet Union) Vladimir Krutov, (Soviet Union) Sergei Makarov, (West Germany) Gerd Truntschka

=== Final standings ===
The final standings of the tournament according to IIHF:

1st place, gold medalist(s)	Sweden
2nd place, silver medalist(s)	Soviet Union
3rd place, bronze medalist(s)	Czechoslovakia
4	Canada
5	Finland
6	West Germany
7	United States
8	Switzerland

=== European championships final standings ===
The final standings of the European championships according to IIHF:

Gold medal	Soviet Union
Silver medal	Czechoslovakia
Bronze medal	Finland
4	Sweden
5	West Germany
6	Switzerland

=== Scoring leaders ===
List shows the top skaters sorted by points, then goals.

Player	GP	G	A	Pts	+/−	PIM	POS
(Soviet Union) Vladimir Krutov	10	11	4	15	+15	8	F
(Soviet Union) Sergei Makarov	10	4	10	14	+19	8	F
(Soviet Union) Igor Larionov	10	4	8	12	+16	2	F
(United States) Aaron Broten	10	5	6	11	+6	6	F
(Soviet Union) Vyacheslav Bykov	10	5	6	11	+13	0	F
(Sweden) Bengt-Åke Gustafsson	10	3	8	11	+9	4	F
(West Germany) Gerd Truntschka	10	3	8	11	+6	13	F
(West Germany) Helmut Steiger	10	5	5	10	+2	12	F
(Sweden) Tomas Sandström	8	4	6	10	+11	6	F
(Soviet Union) Viacheslav Fetisov	10	2	8	10	+13	2	D

=== Leading goaltenders ===
Only the top five goaltenders, based on save percentage, who have played 50% of their team's minutes are included in this list.

Player	MIP	GA	GAA	SVS%	SO
(Soviet Union) Yevgeni Belosheikin	600	15	1.50	.923	3
(Czechoslovakia) Dominik Hašek	520	19	2.19	.923	0
(Sweden) Peter Lindmark	399	14	2.11	.901	2
(Finland) Jarmo Myllys	464	27	3.49	.895	0
(Canada) Sean Burke	300	12	2.40	.895	0
