= 2009 IIHF World Championship Division I =

Tournament details
- Host countries: Lithuania; Poland
- Venues: 2 (in 2 host cities)
- Dates: 11–17 April 2009
- Teams: 12

Tournament statistics
- Games played: 30
- Goals scored: 194 (6.47 per game)
- Attendance: 65,209 (2,174 per game)

The 2009 IIHF World Championship Division I was two ice hockey tournaments under the authority of the International Ice Hockey Federation. The Division I was played amongst two separate groups. The Group A tournament was held in Vilnius, Lithuania and the Group B tournament was hosted by Toruń, Poland. Division I represents the second level of the Ice Hockey World Championships.

== Group A ==
The Group A tournament was played in Vilnius, Lithuania, from 11 to 17 April 2009.

=== Participating teams ===
Team	Qualification
Slovenia	Placed 15th in Top Division last year and were relegated
Kazakhstan	Placed 2nd in Division I Group A last year
Japan	Placed 3rd in Division I Group B last year
Lithuania	Hosts; placed 4th in Division I Group B last year
Croatia	Placed 5th in Division I Group B last year
Australia	Placed 1st in Division II Group B last year and were promoted

=== Final standings ===
Pos	Team	Pld	W	OTW	OTL	L	GF	GA	GD	Pts	Promotion or relegation
1	Kazakhstan	5	5	0	0	0	29	6	+23	15	Promoted to the 2010 Top Division
2	Slovenia	5	4	0	0	1	21	7	+14	12	
3	Japan	5	3	0	0	2	21	8	+13	9	
4	Lithuania (H)	5	2	0	0	3	20	23	−3	6	
5	Croatia	5	1	0	0	4	11	25	−14	3	
6	Australia	5	0	0	0	5	7	40	−33	0	Relegated to the 2010 Division II

Source: IIHF
(H) Host

=== Match results ===
All times are local.

11 April 2009; 13:00	Croatia	1–7 (1–1, 0–4, 0–2)	Japan	Siemens Arena

Game reference

11 April 2009; 16:30	Australia	0–6 (0–3, 0–3, 0–0)	Slovenia	Siemens Arena

Game reference

11 April 2009; 20:00	Lithuania	1–5 (0–2, 0–1, 1–2)	Kazakhstan	Siemens Arena

Game reference

12 April 2009; 13:00	Japan	7–1 (3–0, 3–1, 1–0)	Australia	Siemens Arena

Game reference

12 April 2009; 16:30	Kazakhstan	6–1 (3–0, 3–1, 0–0)	Croatia	Siemens Arena

Game reference

12 April 2009; 20:00	Slovenia	8–2 (0–0, 4–0, 4–2)	Lithuania	Siemens Arena

Game reference

14 April 2009; 13:00	Kazakhstan	3–1 (1–0, 1–1, 1–0)	Japan	Siemens Arena

Game reference

14 April 2009; 16:30	Slovenia	4–2 (1–0, 1–2, 2–0)	Croatia	Siemens Arena

Game reference

14 April 2009; 20:00	Australia	3–9 (0–5, 1–2, 2–2)	Lithuania	Siemens Arena

Game reference

15 April 2009; 13:00	Japan	1–2 (0–1, 1–1, 0–0)	Slovenia	Siemens Arena

Game reference

15 April 2009; 16:30	Kazakhstan	13–2 (5–0, 2–0, 6–2)	Australia	Siemens Arena

Game reference

15 April 2009; 20:00	Lithuania	7–2 (2–1, 1–0, 4–1)	Croatia	Siemens Arena

Game reference

17 April 2009; 13:00	Croatia	5–1 (1–0, 2–1, 2–0)	Australia	Siemens Arena

Game reference

17 April 2009; 16:30	Slovenia	1–2 (0–1, 0–1, 1–0)	Kazakhstan	Siemens Arena

Game reference

17 April 2009; 20:00	Japan	5–1 (1–0, 3–1, 1–0)	Lithuania	Siemens Arena

Game reference

== Group B ==
The Group B tournament was played in Toruń, Poland, from 11 to 17 April 2009.

=== Participating teams ===
Team	Qualification
Italy	Placed 16th in Top Division last year and were relegated
Ukraine	Placed 2nd in Division I Group B last year
Poland	Hosts; placed 3rd in Division I Group A last year
Great Britain	Placed 4th in Division I Group A last year
Netherlands	Placed 5th in Division I Group A last year
Romania	Placed 1st in Division II Group A last year and were promoted

=== Final standings ===
Pos	Team	Pld	W	OTW	OTL	L	GF	GA	GD	Pts	Promotion or relegation
1	Italy	5	5	0	0	0	26	4	+22	15	Promoted to the 2010 Top Division
2	Ukraine	5	3	1	0	1	18	6	+12	11	
3	Great Britain	5	2	1	0	2	17	12	+5	8	
4	Poland (H)	5	2	0	2	1	14	9	+5	8	
5	Netherlands	5	1	0	0	4	9	16	−7	3	
6	Romania	5	0	0	0	5	1	38	−37	0	Relegated to the 2010 Division II

Source: IIHF
(H) Host

=== Match results ===
All times are local.

11 April 2009; 13:00	Great Britain	2–4 (0–0, 1–1, 1–3)	Ukraine	Arena Toruń

Game reference

11 April 2009; 16:30	Romania	0–11 (0–5, 0–4, 0–2)	Italy	Arena Toruń

Game reference

11 April 2009; 20:00	Netherlands	1–3 (0–1, 1–1, 0–1)	Poland	Arena Toruń

Game reference

13 April 2009; 13:00	Italy	5–2 (3–0, 2–1, 0–1)	Great Britain	Arena Toruń

Game reference

13 April 2009; 16:30	Ukraine	5–1 (1–0, 3–0, 1–1)	Netherlands	Arena Toruń

Game reference

13 April 2009; 20:00	Poland	7–0 (2–0, 4–0, 1–0)	Romania	Arena Toruń

Game reference

14 April 2009; 13:00	Italy	4–0 (3–0, 0–0, 1–0)	Netherlands	Arena Toruń

Game reference

14 April 2009; 16:30	Romania	0–8 (0–0, 0–3, 0–5)	Great Britain	Arena Toruń

Game reference

14 April 2009; 20:00	Ukraine	2–1 (GWS) (1–1, 0–0, 0–0) (0–0, 1–0)	Poland	Arena Toruń

Game reference

16 April 2009; 13:00	Great Britain	3–2 (3–0, 0–1, 0–1)	Netherlands	Arena Toruń

Game reference

16 April 2009; 16:30	Ukraine	7–0 (2–0, 3–0, 2–0)	Romania	Arena Toruń

Game reference

16 April 2009; 20:00	Poland	2–4 (1–0, 0–2, 1–2)	Italy	Arena Toruń

Game reference

17 April 2009; 13:00	Netherlands	5–1 (1–0, 2–0, 2–1)	Romania	Arena Toruń

Game reference

17 April 2009; 16:30	Italy	2–0 (0–0, 1–0, 1–0)	Ukraine	Arena Toruń

Game reference

17 April 2009; 20:00	Poland	1–2 (OT) (0–0, 0–1, 1–0) (0–1)	Great Britain	Arena Toruń

Game reference
