= Australia men's national ice hockey team =

Australia
- Nickname: Mighty Roos
- Association: Ice Hockey Australia
- Head coach: Matti Luoma
- Assistants: Mark Rummukainen
- Captain: Cameron Todd
- Most games: Glen Foll (80)
- Top scorer: Greg Oddy (71)
- Most points: Greg Oddy (129)
- Team colors
- IIHF code: AUS
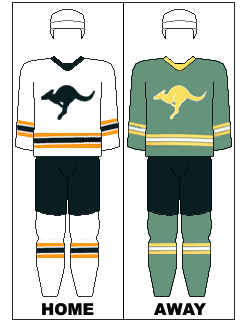

Ranking
- Current IIHF: 39 (▼1) (3 June 2026)
- Highest IIHF: 31 (2009)
- Lowest IIHF: 38 (2018)

First international
- Czechoslovakia 18–1 Australia (Squaw Valley, United States; 20 February 1960)

Biggest win
- Australia 58–0 New Zealand (Perth, Australia; 14 March 1987)

Biggest defeat
- Kazakhstan 23–1 Australia (Ljubljana, Slovenia; 15 March 1993)

Olympics
- Appearances: 1 (first in 1960)

IIHF World Championships
- Appearances: 39 (first in 1960)
- Best result: 9th (1960)

International record (W–L–T)
- 104–125–10

The Australian men's national ice hockey team (nicknamed the Mighty Roos) represent Australia in the sport of ice hockey under the jurisdiction of Ice Hockey Australia which is a part of the International Ice Hockey Federation (IIHF). Australia competed in the Winter Olympics once, in 1960, when the team lost all of their matches. They have also competed in the Ice Hockey World Championships, 33 times with their best result being a ninth-place finish at the same Olympics with a 13th place (or 5th in Pool B) in 1962. The national team currently are in division two after being relegated from division one in 2013 with the team being currently ranked 35th in the IIHF World Rankings.

== History ==
Some Australian national team players are expatriates of Canada and other hockey-playing nations, who have since become outright citizens of Australia or who hold dual citizenship. Australia's ice hockey team has participated in just one Winter Olympics: the 1960 Games in Squaw Valley, California. Australia lost both their games against powerhouses Czechoslovakia (18–1) and eventual gold medalists, the United States (12–1). The team had previously tried to attend the 1956 games in Cortina d'Ampezzo, Italy, but never received approval from the Australian Olympic Committee.

Australia has competed in the Division II World Championships since 2001. In 2007, they were coached by Steve McKenna, a former eight-year veteran of the National Hockey League. At the 2007 Division II World Championships, Australia won three games and lost one, finishing second in their group behind host nation South Korea and narrowly missing promotion to Division I.

Australia hosted the 2008 IIHF World Championship Division II Group B, which was held in Newcastle. The Mighty Roos finished first and captured the gold medal by winning all five games and were promoted to Division I for the first time ever.

== World records ==
Australia previously held the distinction of holding a world record for most goals and highest winning margin in a IIHF World Championship game; they defeated New Zealand by a score of 58–0 in 1987, breaking the record held by Canada (47 goals against Denmark) since 1949. However this was surpassed in 2008 by the Slovak women's team (82 goals against Bulgaria).

== Tournament record ==
=== Olympic Games ===
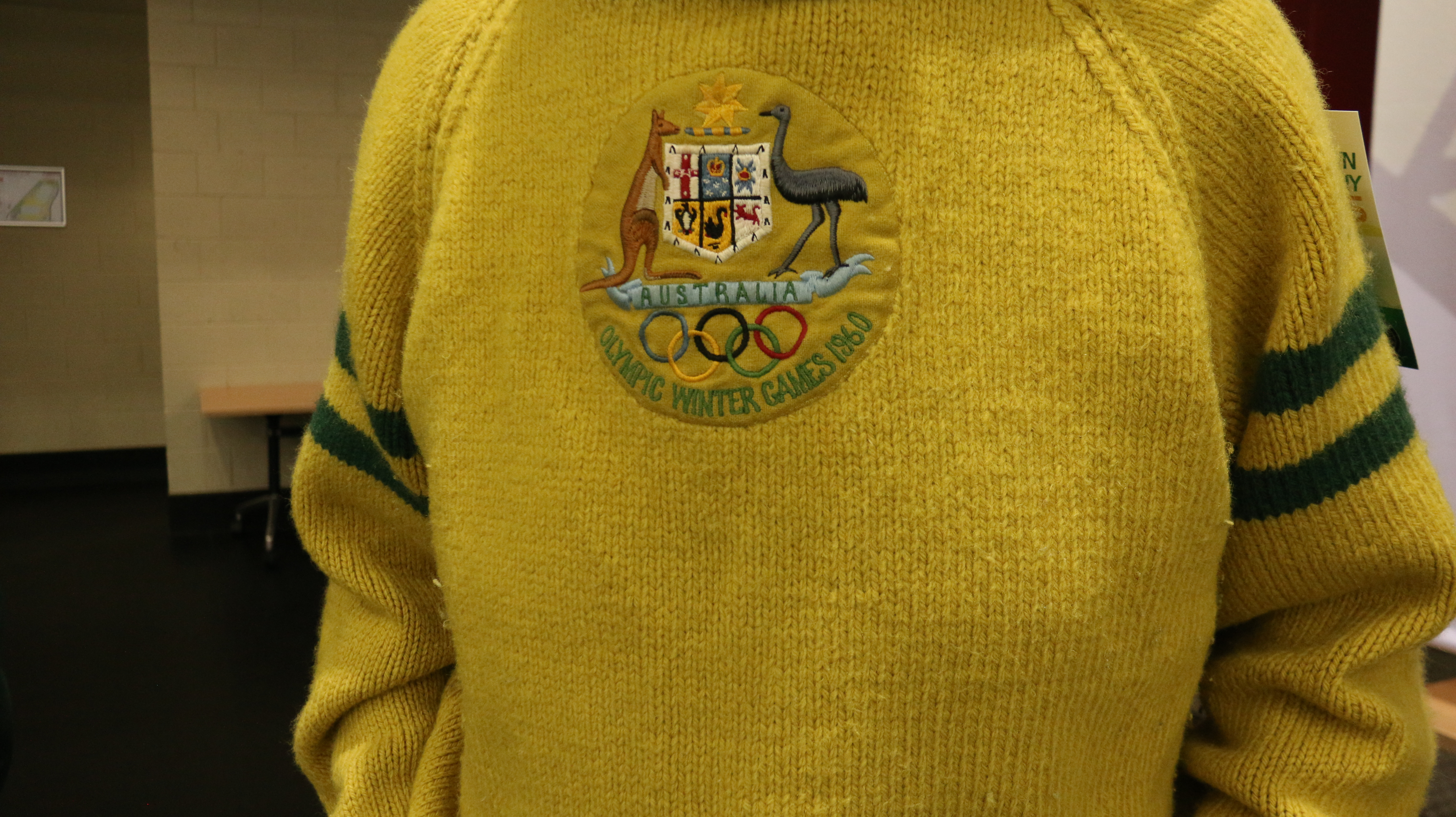
An original Australian ice hockey team sweater from 1960 Winter Olympics

Games	GP	W	T	L	GF	GA	Coach	Captain	Finish	Rank
(United States) 1960 Squaw Valley	6	0	0	6	10	87	William McEachern	N/A	Consolation Round	9th

=== World Championships ===
- 1962 – 13th place (5th in Pool B)
- 1974 – 21st place (7th in Pool C)
- 1979 – 26th place (8th in Pool C)
- 1986 – 26th place (10th in Pool C)
- 1987 – 25th place (1st in Pool D)
- 1989 – 24th place (8th in Pool C)
- 1990 – 27th place (2nd in Pool D)
- 1992 – 23rd place (3rd in Pool C)
- 1993 – 27th place (7th in Pool C)
- 1994 – 33rd place (13th in Pool C)
- 1995 – 36th place (16th in Pool C)
- 1996 – 36th place (8th in Pool D)
- 1997 – 34th place (6th in Pool D)
- 1998 – 34th place (2nd in Pool D)
- 1999 – 34th place (3rd in Pool D)
- 2000 – 36th place (3rd in Pool D)
- 2001 – 33rd place (3rd in Division II, Group A)
- 2002 – 36th place (4th in Division II, Group A)
- 2003 – 36th place (4th in Division II, Group A)
- 2004 – 33rd place (3rd in Division II, Group A)
- 2005 – 31st place (2nd in Division II, Group A)
- 2006 – 32nd place (3rd in Division II, Group B)
- 2007 – 32nd place (2nd in Division II, Group B)
- 2008 – 30th place (1st in Division II, Group B)
- 2009 – 27th place (6th in Division I, Group A)
- 2010 – 32nd place (2nd in Division II, Group A)
- 2011 – 30th place (1st in Division II, Group A)
- 2012 – 28th place (6th in Division IB)
- 2013 – 32nd place (4th in Division IIA)
- 2014 – 32nd place (4th in Division IIA)
- 2015 – 34th place (6th in Division IIA)
- 2016 – 35th place (1st in Division IIB)
- 2017 – 30th place (2nd in Division IIA)
- 2018 – 30th place (2nd in Division IIA)
- 2019 – 31st place (3rd in Division IIA)
- 2020 – Cancelled due to the COVID-19 pandemic
- 2021 – Cancelled due to the COVID-19 pandemic
- 2022 – Withdrawn
- 2023 – 32nd place (4th in Division IIA)
- 2024 – 33rd place (5th in Division IIA)
- 2025 – 33rd place (5th in Division IIA)
- 2026 – Cancelled due to the 2026 Iran War

Also played in 1964 Winter Olympics/World Championships qualification, where lost 2 games with aggregate score 7-34.

== Team ==
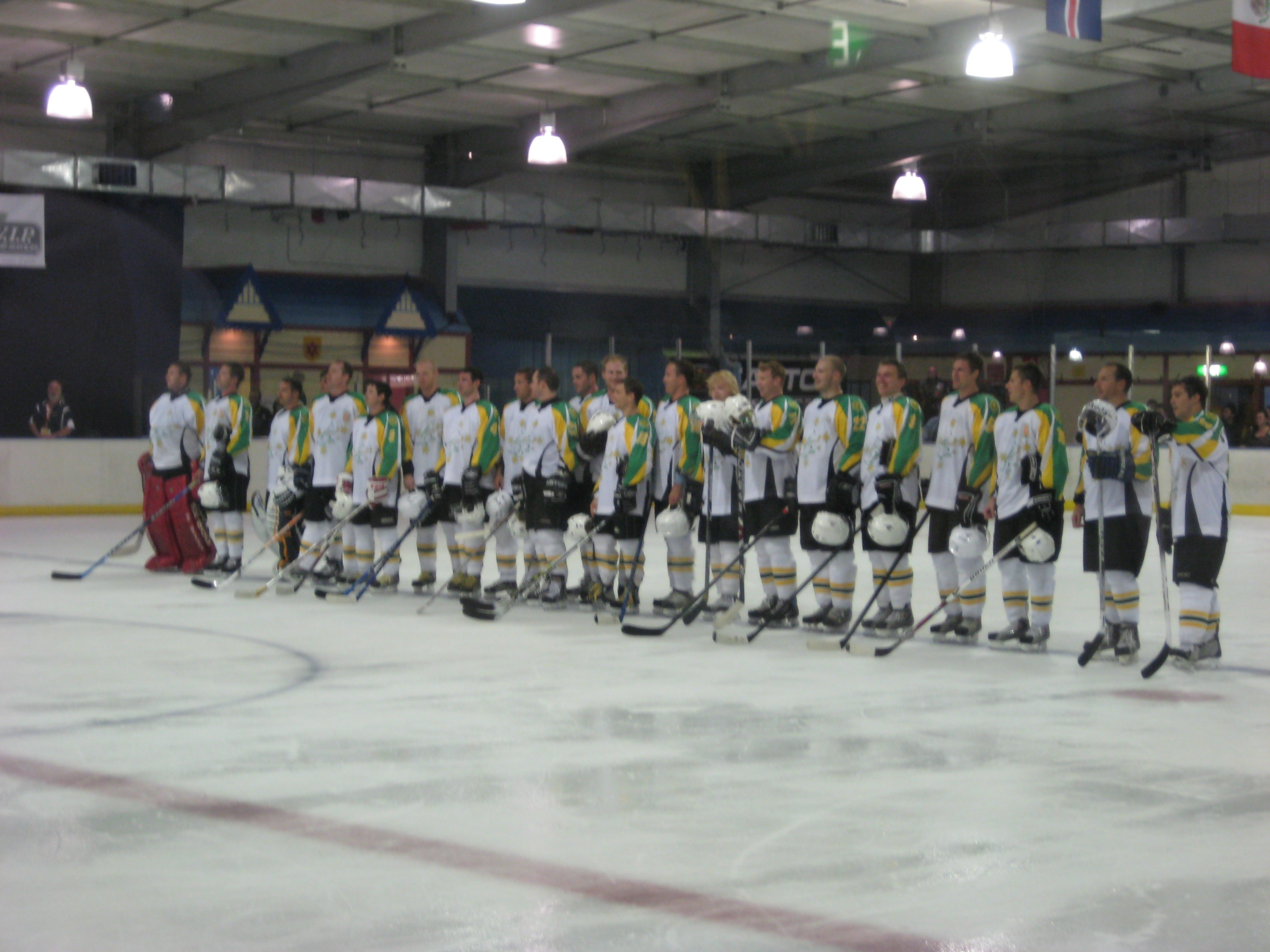
Australia at the 2008 World Championship Division II, Group B.

== All-time record against other nations ==
As of 15 March 2026 Teams named in italics are no longer active.

Team	GP	W	T	L	GF	GA
Austria	1	0	0	1	0	17
Belgium	17	8	0	9	60	67
Bulgaria	11	3	2	6	57	60
China	9	4	1	4	23	49
Chinese Taipei	1	1	0	0	31	3
Croatia	11	1	0	10	22	45
Czechoslovakia	1	0	0	1	1	18
Denmark	2	1	0	1	7	10
Estonia	2	0	0	2	5	25
Finland	2	0	0	2	3	33
France	3	0	0	3	4	32
Georgia	1	0	0	1	2	3
Great Britain	4	0	0	4	8	42
Greece	1	1	0	0	10	2
Hong Kong	2	2	0	0	79	0
Hungary	5	1	0	4	18	39
Iceland	10	6	0	4	30	25
Italy	2	0	0	2	4	25
Israel	15	9	0	6	73	53
Japan	7	0	0	7	17	93
Kazakhstan	2	0	0	2	3	36
Lithuania	3	0	0	3	7	20
Luxembourg	2	2	0	0	29	0
Mexico	7	7	0	0	60	12
Netherlands	6	0	0	6	11	49
New Zealand	36	29	0	7	250	67
North Korea	8	4	1	3	42	30
Poland	1	0	0	1	3	5
Romania	3	0	0	3	5	15
Serbia	11	5	0	6	29	42
Slovenia	2	0	0	2	2	21
South Africa	7	7	0	0	63	23
South Korea	14	2	3	9	55	84
Spain	19	6	3	10	59	83
Switzerland	1	0	0	1	0	20
Turkey	5	5	0	0	75	4
United Arab Emirates	2	0	0	2	5	8
United States	1	0	0	1	1	12
Yugoslavia	2	0	0	2	2	18
Total	213	92	10	111	1169	1123

== All-time record against other clubs ==
As of 11 April 2013

Team	GP	W	T	L	GF	GA
(United States) Denver Pioneers	2	0	0	2	6	14
(Czech Republic) HC Poruba	1	0	0	1	4	5
(Czech Republic) HC Vítkovice Steel U25	2	0	0	2	5	12
(Australia) Victoria All Stars	1	1	0	0	4	3
Total	6	1	0	5	19	34
