= Serbia men's national ice hockey team =

National sports team

Serbia
- Nickname: Beli Orlovi (White Eagles)
- Association: Serbian Ice Hockey Association
- Head coach: Fred Perowne
- Assistants: Stefan Ilić
- Captain: Nemanja Vučurević
- Most games: Nemanja Vučurević (92)
- Top scorer: Marko Kovačević (39)
- Most points: Nemanja Vučurević (72)
- Team colors
- IIHF code: SRB
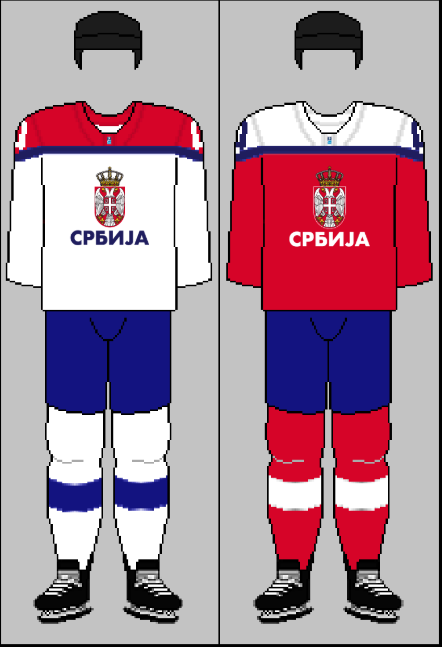

Ranking
- Current IIHF: 30 ▼1 (3 June 2026)
- Highest IIHF: 29 (2010, 2021)
- Lowest IIHF: 32 (2009)

First international
- Serbia 6–4 Turkey (Zagreb, Croatia; 11 April 2007)

Biggest win
- Serbia 17–0 New Zealand (Reykjavík, Iceland; 18 April 2012)

Biggest defeat
- Austria 13–0 Serbia (Tilburg, Netherlands; 19 April 2010); Ukraine 15–2 Serbia (Tilburg, Netherlands; 22 April 2010)

IIHF World Championships
- Appearances: 17 (first in 2007)
- Best result: 26th (2022)

International record (W–L–T)
- 83–96–8

The Serbia men's national ice hockey team is the national men's ice hockey team of Serbia, and a member of the International Ice Hockey Federation. They are currently ranked 30th in the IIHF World Rankings and competes in IIHF World Championship Division II.

== Tournament record ==
=== Olympic Games ===
Year	Position
1924–1992	As part of Yugoslavia
1995–2006	As part of FR Yugoslavia/Serbia and Montenegro
(Canada) 2010 Vancouver	did not qualify
(Russia) 2014 Sochi	did not qualify
(South Korea) 2018 Pyeongchang	did not qualify
(China) 2022 Beijing	did not qualify
(Italy) 2026 Milan / Cortina	did not qualify
(France) 2030 French Alps	Future event

=== World Championships ===
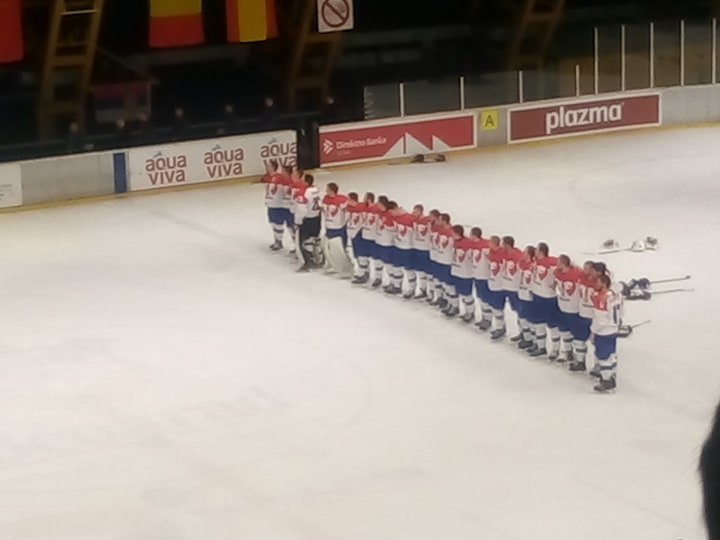
Serbia - China at 2019 IIHF World Championship Division IIA

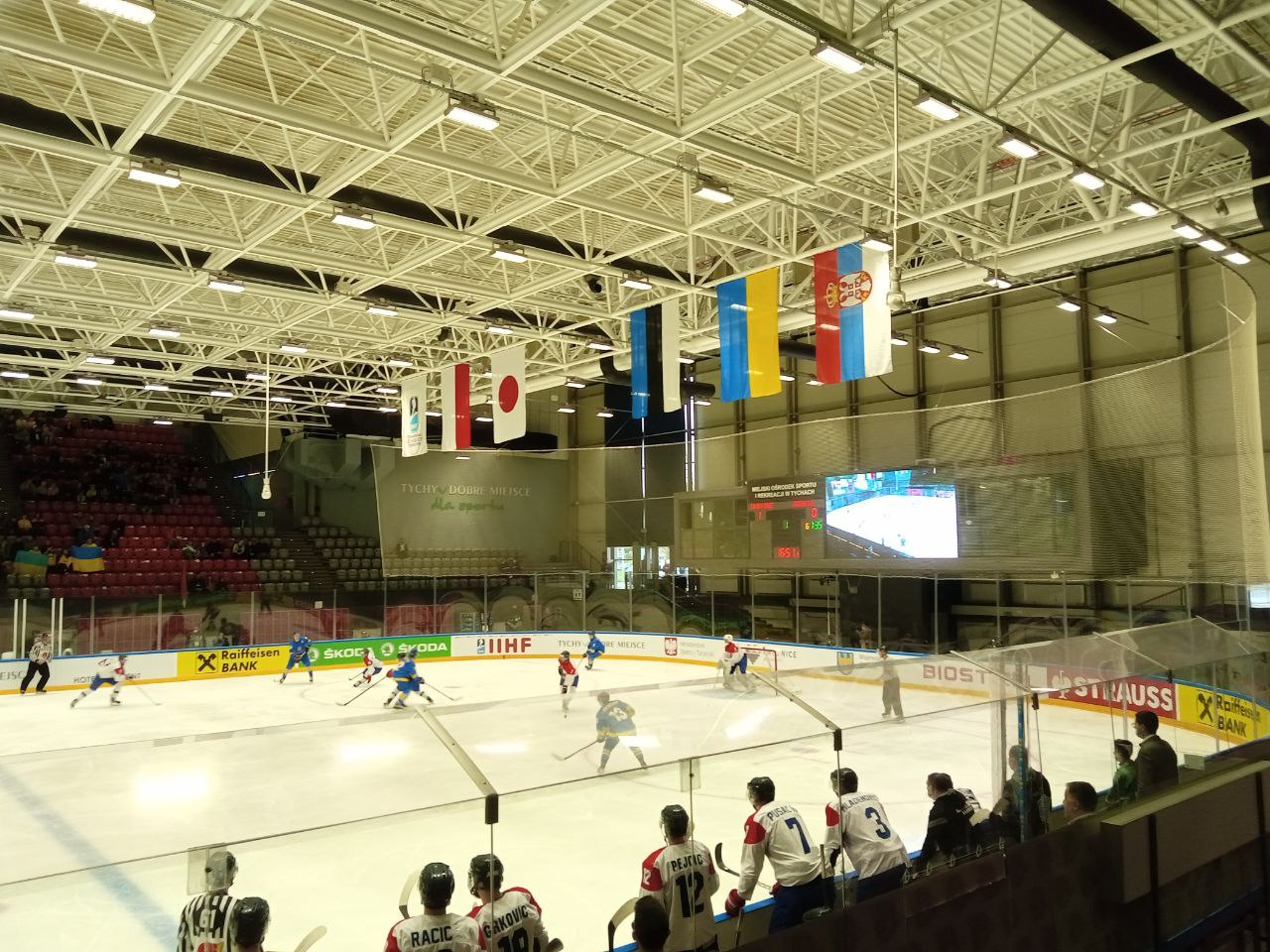
Ukraine against Serbia in 2022

Key: Division I Division II

Year	Division	GP	W	OTW	OTL	L	GF	GA	Pts	Finish	Rank	Movement
1939–1992	as part of Yugoslavia											
1993–2006	as part of Serbia and Montenegro											
2007	Division II, Group A	5	2	0	0	3	18	16	6	4th	35th	—
2008	Division II, Group A	5	3	0	1	1	32	19	10	3rd	33rd	—
2009	Division II, Group A	5	4	1	0	0	40	11	14	1st	30th	▲
2010	Division I, Group A	5	0	0	1	4	8	46	1	6th	27th	▼
2011	Division II, Group A	5	3	0	0	2	22	11	9	3rd	33rd	—
2012	Division II, Group A	5	1	0	0	4	27	20	3	5th	33rd	—
2013	Division II, Group A	5	2	0	0	3	14	21	6	5th	33rd	—
2014	Division II, Group A	5	2	0	1	2	19	23	7	3rd	31st	—
2015	Division II, Group A	5	2	1	2	1	18	22	7	3rd	31st	—
2016	Division II, Group A	5	2	0	1	2	16	14	7	4th	32nd	—
2017	Division II, Group A	5	2	0	2	1	23	15	8	3rd	31st	—
2018	Division II, Group A	5	3	0	1	1	16	14	10	3rd	31st	—
2019	Division II, Group A	5	3	1	0	1	20	14	11	1st	29th	▲
2020	Division I, Group B	Cancelled due to the COVID-19 pandemic										
2021	Division I, Group B	Cancelled due to the COVID-19 pandemic										
2022	Division I, Group B	4	0	0	0	4	4	29	0	4th	26th	—
2023	Division I, Group B	5	0	1	1	3	7	24	3	6th	28th	▼
2024	Division II, Group A	5	4	0	0	1	23	11	12	2nd	30th	—
2025	Division II, Group A	5	4	0	0	1	12	5	12	2nd	30th	—
2026	Division II, Group A	Cancelled due to the 2026 Iran War										
2027	Division II, Group A											—

== All-time record ==
Updated as of 16 April 2025. Teams in italics are no longer actively competing. Overtime and game winning shot victories and losses are counted towards wins and losses. Records of Serbia and Montenegro and Yugoslavia are listed on individual pages.

Opponent	Played	Won	Drawn	Lost	GF	GA	GD
Australia	8	3	0	5	24	25	–1
Austria	1	0	0	1	0	13	–3
Belgium	10	3	0	7	33	35	–2
Bulgaria	3	3	0	0	25	3	+22
China	7	5	0	2	22	22	0
Chinese Taipei	1	1	0	0	6	0	+6
Croatia	17	5	0	12	38	60	–22
Estonia	5	1	0	4	12	20	–8
Great Britain	2	0	0	2	2	17	–15
Hungary	1	0	0	1	1	9	–8
Iceland	11	8	0	3	59	32	+27
Ireland	1	1	0	0	13	1	+12
Israel	5	5	0	0	38	10	+28
Italy	1	0	0	1	0	8	–8
Japan	3	0	0	3	3	21	–18
Lithuania	2	0	0	2	6	17	–11
Mexico	2	1	0	1	10	5	+5
Netherlands	5	1	0	4	10	20	–10
New Zealand	2	2	0	0	23	4	+19
North Korea	2	2	0	0	17	2	+15
Poland	1	0	0	1	2	10	–8
Romania	5	0	0	5	6	28	–22
Spain	9	4	0	5	33	37	–4
Turkey	3	3	0	0	19	7	+12
Ukraine	3	0	0	3	2	29	–27
United Arab Emirates	1	1	0	0	5	2	+3
Total	110	49	0	62	409	437	–28
