= 2003 Men's Ice Hockey World Championships =

2003 edition of the Men's World Ice Hockey Championships

The 2003 Men's Ice Hockey World Championships was the 67th such event sanctioned by the International Ice Hockey Federation (IIHF). The competition also served as qualification for division placements in the 2004 competition. Canada won the gold medal, beating Sweden 3–2 in the final.

== Championship ==
Final standings

1. Canada
2. Sweden
3. Slovakia
4. Czech Republic
5. Finland
6. Germany
7. Russia
8. Switzerland
9. Latvia
10. Austria
11. Denmark
12. Ukraine
13. United States
14. Belarus — relegated to Division I for 2004
15. Slovenia — relegated to Division I for 2004
16. Japan

== Division I ==
=== Group A ===
Played in Budapest, Hungary (April 15–21).

Team	Pld	W	L	D	GF	GA	GD	Pts
Kazakhstan	5	5	0	0	34	9	+25	10
Poland	5	4	1	0	24	9	+15	8
Hungary	5	2	2	1	14	13	+1	5
Netherlands	5	1	3	1	17	22	−5	3
Romania	5	1	3	1	13	26	−13	3
Lithuania	5	0	4	1	7	30	−23	1

Source: IIHF

=== Group B ===
Played in Zagreb, Croatia (April 13–20).

Team	Pld	W	L	D	GF	GA	GD	Pts
France	5	4	0	1	21	5	+16	9
Norway	5	4	1	0	19	9	+10	8
Estonia	5	2	3	0	12	20	−8	4
Italy	5	2	3	0	16	11	+5	4
Great Britain	5	1	3	1	16	14	+2	3
Croatia	5	1	4	0	10	35	−25	2

Source: IIHF

France and Kazakhstan were promoted to the 2004 Men's World Ice Hockey Championships, while Croatia and Lithuania were demoted to Division II.

== Division II ==
=== Group A ===
Played in Seoul, South Korea (April 5–12).

Team	Pld	W	L	D	GF	GA	GD	Pts
South Korea	5	5	0	0	50	10	+40	10
Serbia and Montenegro	5	4	1	0	46	11	+35	8
Spain	5	3	2	0	27	23	+4	6
Australia	5	2	3	0	25	26	−1	4
South Africa	5	1	4	0	19	32	−13	2
Mexico	5	0	5	0	5	70	−65	0

Source: IIHF

=== Group B ===
Played in Sofia, Bulgaria (March 24–30).

Team	Pld	W	L	D	GF	GA	GD	Pts
Belgium	5	4	1	0	29	8	+21	8
China	5	4	1	0	19	13	+6	8
Bulgaria	5	2	2	1	15	10	+5	5
North Korea	5	2	2	1	16	13	+3	5
Israel	5	1	2	2	11	19	−8	4
Iceland	5	0	5	0	4	31	−27	0

Source: IIHF

Belgium and South Korea were promoted to Division I, while Iceland and Mexico were demoted to Division III.

== Division III ==
Played in Auckland, New Zealand (April 3–6).

Team	Pld	W	L	D	GF	GA	GD	Pts
New Zealand	2	2	0	0	14	3	+11	4
Luxembourg	2	1	1	0	7	10	−3	2
Turkey	2	0	2	0	4	12	−8	0

Source: IIHF

Luxembourg and New Zealand were promoted to Division II.
