= 1989 Ice Hockey World Championships =

1989 edition of the World Ice Hockey Championships

Tournament details
- Host country: Sweden
- Venues: 2 (in 2 host cities)
- Dates: 15 April – 1 May
- Teams: 8

Final positions
- Champions: Soviet Union (21st title)
- Runners-up: Canada
- Third place: Czechoslovakia
- Fourth place: Sweden

Tournament statistics
- Games played: 40
- Goals scored: 282 (7.05 per game)
- Attendance: 388,563 (9,714 per game)
- Scoring leader: (Canada) Brian Bellows 14 points

The 1989 Ice Hockey World Championships took place in Sweden from 15 April – 1 May. The games were played in Södertälje and Stockholm, in the newly built arena Globen. Eight teams took part, and each team played each other once. The four best teams then played each other again. This was the 53rd World Championships, and also the 64th European Championships. The Soviet Union became world champions for the 21st time, and also European champions for the 26th time.

The tournament was marred by positive drug tests. Only the goal totals of the Americans were affected in the end. Their losses against the Czechoslovaks and the Canadians were ruled as shutouts because of Corey Millen's high testosterone levels. Canadian Randy Carlyle also came under suspicion, but his A and B samples did not match, and he was cleared of wrongdoing. The Soviet team won all ten of their games.

At the end of the tournament, Soviet star Alexander Mogilny defected to the United States by getting on a plane with two Buffalo Sabres executives. The Sabres had drafted Mogilny the year before. He joined the team and went on to score 1032 points in his NHL career.

== World Championship Group A (Sweden) ==
=== First round ===
Pos	Team	Pld	W	D	L	GF	GA	GD	Pts
1	Soviet Union	7	7	0	0	36	12	+24	14
2	Sweden	7	4	2	1	29	20	+9	10
3	Canada	7	5	0	2	45	18	+27	10
4	Czechoslovakia	7	3	2	2	33	15	+18	8
5	Finland	7	2	1	4	22	25	−3	5
6	United States	7	2	1	4	20	29	−9	5
7	Poland	7	1	0	6	10	59	−49	2
8	West Germany	7	0	2	5	17	34	−17	2

15 April	Canada	6-4	Finland

15 April	Czechoslovakia	3-3	West Germany

15 April	Soviet Union	4-2	United States

15 April	Sweden	5-1	Poland

16 April	Canada	11-0	Poland

16 April	Sweden	4-2	United States

16 April	Czechoslovakia	3-1	Finland

16 April	Soviet Union	5-1	West Germany

18 April	Canada	8-0	United States

18 April	Czechoslovakia	15-0	Poland

18 April	Soviet Union	4-1	Finland

18 April	Sweden	3-3	West Germany

19 April	Canada	8-2	West Germany

19 April	Soviet Union	12-1	Poland

19 April	Czechoslovakia	5-0	United States

19 April	Sweden	6-3	Finland

21 April	Sweden	6-5	Canada

21 April	Soviet Union	4-2	Czechoslovakia

21 April	Finland	7-2	Poland

21 April	United States	7-4	West Germany

22 April	Soviet Union	4-3	Canada

22 April	Czechoslovakia	3-3	Sweden

23 April	Finland	3-3	United States

23 April	Poland	5-3	West Germany

24 April	Canada	4-2	Czechoslovakia

24 April	Soviet Union	3-2	Sweden

25 April	United States	6-1	Poland

25 April	Finland	3-1	West Germany

=== Final Round ===
Pos	Team	Pld	W	D	L	GF	GA	GD	Pts
1	Soviet Union	3	3	0	0	11	4	+7	6
2	Canada	3	2	0	1	12	11	+1	4
3	Czechoslovakia	3	1	0	2	5	6	−1	2
4	Sweden	3	0	0	3	5	12	−7	0

27 April	Canada	5-3	Sweden

27 April	Soviet Union	1-0	Czechoslovakia

29 April	Soviet Union	5-3	Canada

29 April	Czechoslovakia	2-1 (2-0, 0-0, 0-1)	Sweden	Attendance: 13,856

Dominik Hašek
Goalies
Peter Lindmark

Jelínek – 13:37	1 – 0
Svitek – 14:00	2 – 0
	2 – 1	48:53 – Rundqvist

24
Shots
27

1 May	Canada	4-3	Czechoslovakia

1 May	Soviet Union	5-1	Sweden

=== Consolation round ===
Pos	Team	Pld	W	D	L	GF	GA	GD	Pts
5	Finland	10	5	1	4	35	27	+8	11
6	United States	10	4	1	5	37	40	−3	9
7	West Germany	10	1	2	7	22	41	−19	4
8	Poland	10	1	0	9	12	76	−64	2

Poland was relegated to Group B.

26 April	United States	11-2	Poland

26 April	Finland	3-0	West Germany

28 April	United States	4-3	West Germany

28 April	Finland	4-0	Poland

30 April	Finland	6-2	United States

30 April	West Germany	2-0	Poland

== World Championship Group B (Norway) ==
Played in Oslo and Lillehammer 30 March to 9 April. The 5 April game between Norway and Austria was officially adjusted to 8-0 for Norway because of Siegfried Haberl's positive drug test. Standard procedure, since 1969, had been for Group B and Group C to exchange two teams, but that stopped this year.

Pos	Team	Pld	W	D	L	GF	GA	GD	Pts
9	Norway	7	5	1	1	28	16	+12	11
10	Italy	7	5	1	1	37	16	+21	11
11	France	7	4	2	1	29	18	+11	10
12	Switzerland	7	5	0	2	40	21	+19	10
13	East Germany	7	3	0	4	22	29	−7	6
14	Austria	7	2	0	5	25	32	−7	4
15	Japan	7	2	0	5	20	34	−14	4
16	Denmark	7	0	0	7	9	44	−35	0

Norway was promoted to Group A and Denmark was relegated to Group C.

30 March	Austria	3-4	Italy

30 March	Norway	7-4	Japan

30 March	France	3-5	East Germany

30 March	Switzerland	6-3	Denmark

31 March	Norway	3-1	Italy

31 March	France	8-0	Denmark

1 April	Japan	0-10	Switzerland

1 April	East Germany	4-0	Austria

2 April	Austria	10-3	Denmark

2 April	Norway	5-2	East Germany

2 April	France	5-4	Japan

3 April	Switzerland	6-7	Italy

4 April	Italy	3-3	France

4 April	East Germany	0-3	Switzerland

4 April	Japan	2-4	Austria

4 April	Norway	3-2	Denmark

5 April	Norway	8-2	Austria

6 April	Italy	6-0	Japan

6 April	Denmark	0-9	East Germany

6 April	Switzerland	2-5	France

7 April	Denmark	0-6	Italy

7 April	Norway	1-1	France

8 April	Japan	8-1	East Germany

8 April	Austria	5-7	Switzerland

9 April	Denmark	1-2	Japan

9 April	East Germany	1-10	Italy

9 April	Austria	3-4	France

9 April	Norway	1-6	Switzerland

== World Championship Group C (Australia) ==
Played in Sydney 18–27 March.

Pos	Team	Pld	W	D	L	GF	GA	GD	Pts
17	Netherlands	7	7	0	0	48	15	+33	14
18	Yugoslavia	7	6	0	1	55	15	+40	12
19	China	7	4	1	2	31	29	+2	9
20	Hungary	7	3	1	3	32	30	+2	7
21	Bulgaria	7	3	1	3	35	35	0	7
22	North Korea	7	2	0	5	26	40	−14	4
23	South Korea	7	1	1	5	27	46	−19	3
24	Australia	7	0	0	7	14	58	−44	0

The Netherlands were promoted to Group B, and Australia was relegated to Group D.

18 March	Yugoslavia	8-1	Bulgaria

18 March	Hungary	6-3	North Korea

18 March	Netherlands	5-2	South Korea

18 March	Australia	1-3	China

19 March	Yugoslavia	11-2	South Korea

19 March	Australia	2-9	Hungary

20 March	Bulgaria	3-3	China

20 March	Netherlands	3-1	North Korea

21 March	China	5-3	Hungary

21 March	Netherlands	4-1	Bulgaria

21 March	North Korea	7-4	South Korea

21 March	Australia	2-8	Yugoslavia

22 March	Hungary	0-3	Yugoslavia

22 March	Australia	2-6	South Korea

23 March	China	5-8	Netherlands

23 March	Bulgaria	8-4	North Korea

24 March	South Korea	4-10	China

24 March	Yugoslavia	14-1	North Korea

24 March	Hungary	7-4	Bulgaria

24 March	Australia	1-12	Netherlands

26 March	Bulgaria	6-4	South Korea

26 March	China	1-8	Yugoslavia

26 March	Netherlands	8-2	Hungary

26 March	Australia	1-8	North Korea

27 March	North Korea	2-4	China

27 March	South Korea	5-5	Hungary

27 March	Yugoslavia	3-8	Netherlands

27 March	Australia	5-12	Bulgaria

== World Championship Group D (Belgium) ==
Played in Geel and Heist-op-den-Berg 16–21 March.

Positive drug tests wiped out the results of the first day: both games were officially rendered scoreless, and were counted as losses for all four teams.

Pos	Team	Pld	W	D	L	GF	GA	GD	Pts
25	Belgium	4	3	0	1	35	9	+26	6
26	Romania	4	2	1	1	69	7	+62	5
27	Great Britain	4	1	1	2	19	16	+3	3
28	Spain	4	1	0	3	29	27	+2	2
29	New Zealand	4	0	0	4	3	96	−93	0

Both Belgium and Romania were promoted to Group C.

16 March	New Zealand	0-26	Great Britain

16 March	Belgium	3-8	Romania

17 March	Spain	23-0	New Zealand

17 March	Great Britain	6-6	Romania

18 March	Belgium	8-2	Spain

19 March	New Zealand	1-52	Romania

19 March	Great Britain	5-6	Belgium

20 March	Spain	0-11	Romania

21 March	Spain	4-8	Great Britain

21 March	Belgium	21-2	New Zealand

== Ranking and statistics ==
1989 IIHF World Championship winners

Soviet Union
21st title

=== Tournament Awards ===
- Best players selected by the directorate:
  - Best Goaltender: (Czechoslovakia) Dominik Hašek
  - Best Defenceman: (Soviet Union) Viacheslav Fetisov
  - Best Forward: (Canada) Brian Bellows
- Media All-Star Team:
  - Goaltender: (Czechoslovakia) Dominik Hašek
  - Defence: (Sweden) Anders Eldebrink, (Soviet Union) Viacheslav Fetisov
  - Forwards: (Soviet Union) Vyacheslav Bykov, (Soviet Union) Sergei Makarov, (Canada) Steve Yzerman

=== Final standings ===
The final standings of the tournament according to IIHF:

1st place, gold medalist(s)	Soviet Union
2nd place, silver medalist(s)	Canada
3rd place, bronze medalist(s)	Czechoslovakia
4	Sweden
5	Finland
6	United States
7	West Germany
8	Poland

=== European championships final standings ===
The final standings of the European Championship were determined by the points earned in games played solely between European teams.

Gold medal	Soviet Union
Silver medal	Czechoslovakia
Bronze medal	Sweden
4	Finland
5	Poland
6	West Germany

=== Scoring leaders ===
List shows the top skaters sorted by points, then goals.

Player	GP	G	A	Pts	+/−	PIM	POS
(Canada) Brian Bellows	10	8	6	14	+12	2	F
(Czechoslovakia) Vladimír Růžička	10	7	7	14	+11	2	F
(Finland) Kari Jalonen	10	5	9	14	+14	0	F
(Sweden) Kent Nilsson	10	3	11	14	+7	0	F
(Soviet Union) Vyacheslav Bykov	10	6	6	12	+9	2	F
(Canada) Steve Yzerman	8	5	7	12	+5	2	F
(Canada) Dale Hawerchuk	10	4	8	12	+10	6	F
(Canada) Kirk Muller	9	6	4	10	+12	6	F
(Finland) Jukka Vilander	10	6	4	10	0	0	F
(Czechoslovakia) Vladimír Svitek	10	4	6	10	+10	0	F

=== Leading goaltenders ===
Only the top five goaltenders, based on save percentage, who have played 50% of their team's minutes are included in this list.

Player	MIP	GA	GAA	SVS%	SO
(Soviet Union) Sergei Mylnikov	420	11	1.57	.922	1
(Canada) Sean Burke	275	10	2.18	.918	1
(Finland) Jukka Tammi	520	23	2.65	.916	2
(Czechoslovakia) Dominik Hašek	600	21	2.10	.915	2
(Sweden) Peter Lindmark	299	15	3.01	.900	0
