= 2021 IIHF World Championship Division II =

Cancelled ice hockey tournament

Tournament details
- Host countries: China; Iceland
- Venues: 2 (in 2 host cities)
- Dates: 10–16 April (cancelled); 18–24 April (cancelled)
- Teams: 12

The 2021 IIHF World Championship Division II was scheduled to be an international ice hockey tournament run by the International Ice Hockey Federation.

The Group A tournament would have been held in Beijing, China from 10 to 16 April and the Group B tournament in Reykjavík, Iceland from 18 to 24 April 2021.

On 18 November 2020, both tournaments were cancelled due to the COVID-19 pandemic.

== Group A tournament ==
2021 IIHF World Championship Division II A
Tournament details
- Host country: China
- Venue: 1 (in 1 host city)
- Dates: 10–16 April (cancelled)
- Teams: 6

=== Participants ===
Team	Qualification
Netherlands	Placed 6th in Division I B previous year and was relegated.
Croatia	Placed 2nd in Division II A previous year.
Australia	Placed 3rd in Division II A previous year.
Spain	Placed 4th in Division II A previous year.
China	Host, placed 5th in Division II A previous year.
Israel	Placed 1st in Division II B previous year and was promoted.

=== Standings ===
Pos	Team	Pld	W	OTW	OTL	L	GF	GA	GD	Pts	Qualification or relegation
1	Netherlands	0	0	0	0	0	0	0	0	0	Promotion to 2022 Division I B
2	Croatia	0	0	0	0	0	0	0	0	0	
3	Australia	0	0	0	0	0	0	0	0	0	
4	Spain	0	0	0	0	0	0	0	0	0	
5	China (H)	0	0	0	0	0	0	0	0	0	
6	Israel	0	0	0	0	0	0	0	0	0	Relegation to 2022 Division II B

Rules for classification: 1) points; 2) head-to-head points; 3) head-to-head goal difference; 4) head-to-head number of goals scored; 5) result against closest best-ranked team outside tied teams; 6) result against second-best ranked team outside tied teams; 7) seeding before tournament.
(H) Host

== Group B tournament ==
2021 IIHF World Championship Division II B
Tournament details
- Host country: Iceland
- Venue: 1 (in 1 host city)
- Dates: 18–24 April (cancelled)
- Teams: 6

=== Participants ===
Team	Qualification
Belgium	Placed 6th in Division II A previous year and was relegated.
Iceland	Host, placed 2nd in Division II B previous year.
New Zealand	Placed 3rd in Division II B previous year.
Georgia	Placed 4th in Division II B previous year.
Mexico	Placed 5th in Division II B previous year.
Bulgaria	Placed 1st in Division III previous year and was promoted.

=== Standings ===
Pos	Team	Pld	W	OTW	OTL	L	GF	GA	GD	Pts	Qualification or relegation
1	Belgium	0	0	0	0	0	0	0	0	0	Promotion to 2022 Division II A
2	Iceland (H)	0	0	0	0	0	0	0	0	0	
3	New Zealand	0	0	0	0	0	0	0	0	0	
4	Mexico	0	0	0	0	0	0	0	0	0	
5	Georgia	0	0	0	0	0	0	0	0	0	
6	Bulgaria	0	0	0	0	0	0	0	0	0	Relegation to 2022 Division III A

Rules for classification: 1) points; 2) head-to-head points; 3) head-to-head goal difference; 4) head-to-head number of goals scored; 5) result against closest best-ranked team outside tied teams; 6) result against second-best ranked team outside tied teams; 7) seeding before tournament.
(H) Host
