= 2009 IIHF World Championship Division II =

Tournament details
- Host countries: Serbia; Bulgaria
- Venue(s): 2 (in 2 host cities)
- Dates: 7–13 April 2009 (A); 6–12 April 2009 (B)
- Teams: 12

The 2009 IIHF World Championship Division II was two international ice hockey tournaments organized by the International Ice Hockey Federation. The Division II was played in two separate groups. The Group A tournament was held in Novi Sad, Serbia and the Group B tournament was hosted by Sofia, Bulgaria. Division II represents the third level of the Ice Hockey World Championships.

== Group A ==
The Group A tournament was played in Novi Sad, Serbia, from 7 to 13 April 2009.

=== Participating teams ===
Team	Qualification
Estonia	Placed 6th in Division I Group B last year and were relegated
China	Placed 2nd in Division II Group B last year
Serbia	Hosts; placed 3rd in Division II Group A last year
Israel	Placed 4th in Division II Group A last year
Iceland	Placed 5th in Division II Group B last year
North Korea	Placed 1st in Division III last year and were promoted

=== Final standings ===
Pos	Team	Pld	W	OTW	OTL	L	GF	GA	GD	Pts	Promotion or relegation
1	Serbia (H)	5	4	1	0	0	40	11	+29	14	Promoted to the 2010 Division I
2	Estonia	5	4	0	1	0	68	12	+56	13	
3	China	5	2	1	0	2	21	29	−8	8	
4	Iceland	5	2	0	1	2	11	30	−19	7	
5	Israel	5	1	0	0	4	9	38	−29	3	
6	North Korea	5	0	0	0	5	11	40	−29	0	Relegated to the 2010 Division III

Source: IIHF
(H) Host

=== Match results ===
All times are local.

7 April 2009; 13:30	China	3–2 (OT) (1–1, 0–0, 1–1) (1–0)	Iceland	Novi Sad Arena

Game reference

7 April 2009; 17:00	North Korea	1–2 (1–1, 0–1, 0–0)	Israel	Novi Sad Arena

Game reference

7 April 2009; 20:30	Serbia	5–4 (GWS) (1–0, 1–4, 2–0) (0–0, 1–0)	Estonia	Novi Sad Arena

Game reference

8 April 2009; 13:30	Iceland	3–2 (1–2, 1–0, 1–0)	North Korea	Novi Sad Arena

Game reference

8 April 2009; 17:00	Estonia	16–2 (6–1, 7–1, 3–0)	Israel	Novi Sad Arena

Game reference

8 April 2009; 20:30	China	3–5 (2–1, 1–3, 0–1)	Serbia	Novi Sad Arena

Game reference

10 April 2009; 13:30	China	7–5 (2–1, 4–1, 1–3)	North Korea	Novi Sad Arena

Game reference

10 April 2009; 17:00	Estonia	16–1 (4–1, 5–0, 7–0)	Iceland	Novi Sad Arena

Game reference

10 April 2009; 20:30	Serbia	12–1 (4–0, 5–0, 3–1)	Israel	Novi Sad Arena

Game reference

11 April 2009; 13:30	North Korea	1–16 (1–5, 0–5, 0–6)	Estonia	Novi Sad Arena

Game reference

11 April 2009; 17:00	Israel	1–5 (1–0, 0–3, 0–2)	China	Novi Sad Arena

Game reference

11 April 2009; 20:30	Iceland	1–6 (0–3, 1–1, 0–2)	Serbia	Novi Sad Arena

Game reference

13 April 2009; 13:30	Estonia	16–3 (2–0, 9–1, 5–2)	China	Novi Sad Arena

Game reference

13 April 2009; 17:00	Israel	3–4 (0–2, 1–1, 2–1)	Iceland	Novi Sad Arena

Game reference

13 April 2009; 20:30	Serbia	12–2 (8–0, 2–2, 2–0)	North Korea	Novi Sad Arena

Game reference

== Group B ==
The Group B tournament was played in Sofia, Bulgaria, from 6 to 12 April 2009.

=== Participating teams ===
Team	Qualification
South Korea	Placed 6th in Division I Group A last year and were relegated
Belgium	Placed 2nd in Division II Group A last year
Spain	Placed 3rd in Division II Group B last year
Mexico	Placed 4th in Division II Group B last year
Bulgaria	Hosts; placed 5th in Division II Group A last year
South Africa	Placed 2nd in Division III last year and were promoted

=== Final standings ===
Pos	Team	Pld	W	OTW	OTL	L	GF	GA	GD	Pts	Promotion or relegation
1	South Korea	5	5	0	0	0	48	10	+38	15	Promoted to the 2010 Division I
2	Belgium	5	4	0	0	1	31	11	+20	12	
3	Spain	5	3	0	0	2	28	15	+13	9	
4	Bulgaria (H)	5	2	0	0	3	30	33	−3	6	
5	Mexico	5	1	0	0	4	11	33	−22	3	
6	South Africa	5	0	0	0	5	8	54	−46	0	Relegated to the 2010 Division III

Source: IIHF
(H) Host

=== Match results ===
All times are local.

6 April 2009; 12:00	Spain	4–6 (0–2, 1–1, 3–3)	South Korea	Winter Sports Palace

Game reference

6 April 2009; 15:30	South Africa	2–4 (0–2, 1–0, 1–2)	Mexico	Winter Sports Palace

Game reference

6 April 2009; 19:00	Belgium	6–3 (3–2, 3–1, 0–0)	Bulgaria	Winter Sports Palace

Game reference

7 April 2009; 12:00	South Korea	8–2 (1–0, 2–0, 5–2)	Mexico	Winter Sports Palace

Game reference

7 April 2009; 15:30	Belgium	3–1 (1–0, 2–0, 0–1)	Spain	Winter Sports Palace

Game reference

7 April 2009; 19:00	Bulgaria	12–3 (2–0, 4–3, 6–0)	South Africa	Winter Sports Palace

Game reference

9 April 2009; 12:00	Belgium	11–1 (5–0, 2–1, 4–0)	South Africa	Winter Sports Palace

Game reference

9 April 2009; 15:30	Spain	4–1 (2–0, 1–0, 1–1)	Mexico	Winter Sports Palace

Game reference

9 April 2009; 19:00	South Korea	14–2 (3–1, 4–0, 7–1)	Bulgaria	Winter Sports Palace

Game reference

10 April 2009; 12:00	Mexico	1–9 (0–2, 1–5, 0–2)	Belgium	Winter Sports Palace

Game reference

10 April 2009; 15:30	South Africa	0–15 (0–7, 0–4, 0–4)	South Korea	Winter Sports Palace

Game reference

10 April 2009; 19:00	Bulgaria	3–7 (1–1, 1–2, 1–4)	Spain	Winter Sports Palace

Game reference

12 April 2009; 12:00	Spain	12–2 (4–1, 3–0, 5–1)	South Africa	Winter Sports Palace

Game reference

12 April 2009; 15:30	South Korea	5–2 (2–1, 1–0, 2–1)	Belgium	Winter Sports Palace

Game reference

12 April 2009; 19:00	Mexico	3–10 (1–1, 0–3, 2–6)	Bulgaria	Winter Sports Palace

Game reference
