= Tutt =

Tutt may refer to:

== People ==
- Andy Tutt (born 1968), British cricketer
- Charles L. Tutt Sr. (1864–1909), American businessman, miner, real estate investor
- Charles L. Tutt Jr. (1889–1961), American businessman and philanthropist
- Charles L. Tutt III (1911–1993), American engineer, educator, president of the American Society of Mechanical Engineers
- J. W. Tutt (1858–1911), British entomologist
- Jason Tutt (born 1991), Australian rules footballer
- Ron Tutt (1938–2021), American drummer for Elvis Presley and Neil Diamond
- William Thayer Tutt (1912–1989), American ice hockey executive
- Julian Rhind-Tutt (born 1967), British actor
- Tutt Brothers (1882–1951), American vaudeville producers, writers, and performers from Indiana

== Other uses ==
- Tutt (clan), a Sikh Jat clan
- River Tutt, a tributary of the River Ure, North Yorkshire, England
- Tropical upper tropospheric trough, in meteorology
- T_{UTT} (linguistics), the time of utterance in linguistics
- Tutt Building in Pueblo, Colorado, US; NRHP-listed
- Tutt Library at Colorado College, Colorado Springs, Colorado, U.S.

== See also ==
- Tutt Hill, Bracelet Bay, Wales
