= Charles Tutt =

Charles Tutt may refer to:

- Charles L. Tutt Sr. (1864–1909), miner and prominent citizen in Colorado Springs
- Charles L. Tutt Jr. (1889–1961), his son, American philanthropist
- Charles L. Tutt III (1911–1993), his son, president of the American Society of Mechanical Engineers
