= Golden Fleece Mining and Milling Company =

Golden Fleece Mining and Milling Company may refer to:

- Golden Fleece Mining and Milling Company (Iowa), incorporated in 1893
- Golden Fleece Mining and Milling Company (New York), incorporated in 1882
