= Golden Fleece (disambiguation) =

The Golden Fleece is an element of Greek mythology.

Golden Fleece may also refer to:

== Buildings ==
- Golden Fleece Inn, York, an inn in England
- Golden Fleece, Thirsk, a hotel in England

== Companies ==
- Golden Fleece Company, a defunct Australian retail fuel chain
- Golden Fleece Ltd., a New York-based arts organization
- Golden Fleece Mining and Milling Company (Iowa)

== Vehicles ==
- Golden Fleece (clipper), an 1855 California clipper that caught fire with a cargo of ice
- Golden Fleece (pirate ship), a pirate ship captained by Joseph Bannister in the late 1600s
- Golden Fleece, a LNER Class A4 steam locomotive

== Books ==
- William Vaughan under the pseudonym "Orpheus Junior" wrote:
  - The Golden Fleece (1600),
  - The Golden Fleece... transported from Cambriol Colchis, by Orpheus Junior (1626)
- The Golden Fleece, an 1892 novel by Julian Hawthorne
- Golden Fleece, a 1999 science fiction novel by Robert J. Sawyer
- The Golden Fleece, a 1961 novel by John Boland
- The Golden Fleece, a 1944 novel by Robert Graves
- The Golden Fleece, Tales from Caucasus, a 1971 book translated from Russian to English by Avril Pyman

== Other uses ==
- The Golden Fleece (trilogy of plays), an 1821 trilogy of plays by Franz Grillparzer
- Golden Fleece (horse), an Irish racehorse
- The Golden Fleece (painting), an 1894 painting by Tom Roberts
- Golden Fleece, Queensland, a locality in the North Burnett Region, Queensland, Australia
- Golden Fleece Award, a dubious recognition in American politics
- Golden Fleece Award, an Irish arts and crafts award established by Lillias Mitchell
- Golden Fleece Historical Adventure, or simply Golden Fleece, American 1930s pulp magazine
- Golden Fleece Mine (Colorado), a gold mine in Hinsdale County, Colorado, US
- Goldenfleece or Ericameria arborescens, a species of plant
- Operation Golden Fleece, a 1993 non-combatant evacuation operation of the Hellenic Navy in Georgia
- "The Golden Fleece", a 1963 episode of the British thriller series The Avengers.

== See also ==
- Golden ram (disambiguation)
- Order of the Golden Fleece
- Order of the Golden Fleece (Georgia)
- The Golden Fleecing (disambiguation)
