= 1988 in ice hockey =

The following is a chronicle of events during the year 1988 in ice hockey.

== Olympics ==
Hosted in Calgary, Alberta, Canada, the ice hockey at the 1998 Winter Olympics event saw games contested at the Olympic Saddledome, Stampede Corral and Father David Bauer Olympic Arena. The Soviet Union won their seventh gold medal. Sweden defeated host country Canada for the bronze medal. Vladimir Krutov was the leading scorer.

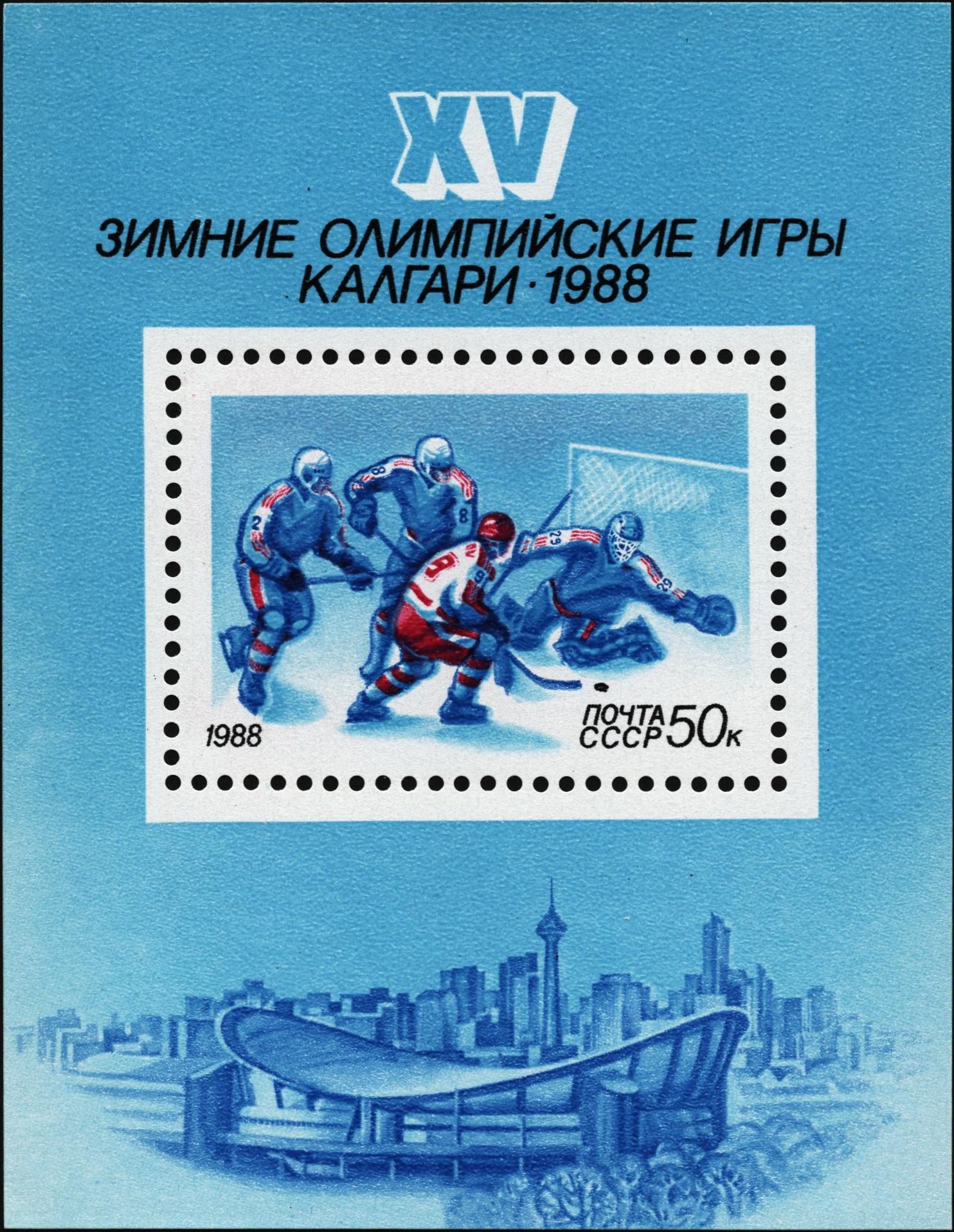

== National Hockey League ==
- Art Ross Trophy as the NHL's leading scorer during the regular season: Mario Lemieux, Pittsburgh Penguins
- Hart Memorial Trophy: for the NHL's Most Valuable Player: Mario Lemieux, Pittsburgh Penguins
- Stanley Cup - Edmonton Oilers defeat the Boston Bruins in the 1988 Stanley Cup Finals
- The Minnesota North Stars selected Mike Modano with the first pick overall in the 1988 NHL Draft

== Canadian Hockey League ==
- Ontario Hockey League: The Windsor Spitfires captured the J. Ross Robertson Cup.
- Quebec Major Junior Hockey League: The Hull Olympiques won the President's Cup (QMJHL)
- Western Hockey League: The Medicine Hat Tigers won the President's Cup (WHL)
- Memorial Cup: The Chicoutimi Saguenéens served as host team for the 1988 Memorial Cup, which was won by the Medicine Hat Tigers

== International hockey ==
Nations that did not participate in the Calgary Olympics ice hockey tournament were invited to compete in the 1988 Thayer Tutt Trophy tournament. Held from March 20–27, 1988 in Eindhoven and Tilburg, Netherlands, Italy finished first, Japan finished second, and the Netherlands finished third.

=== World Hockey Championship ===
  - Men's champion: Olympic year, no tournament
  - Junior Men's champion:

== Junior A hockey ==
- The Notre Dame Hounds won the Royal Bank Cup.

== University hockey ==
- Robb Stauber of the Minnesota Golden Gophers men's ice hockey program won the Hobey Baker Award.

== Season articles ==
1987–88 NHL season	1988–89 NHL season
1987–88 AHL season	1988–89 AHL season

== Births ==
- July 14 – Mikko Tolvanen, Finnish professional ice hockey goaltender

== See also ==
- 1988 in sports
