= Tolvanen =

Tolvanen is a Finnish surname. Notable people with the surname include:

- Eeli Tolvanen (born 1999), Finnish ice hockey forward
- Kari Tolvanen (born 1961), Finnish politician
- Marianna Tolvanen (born 1992), Finnish football player
- Mikko Tolvanen (born 1988), Finnish ice hockey goaltender
- Reino Tolvanen (1920–1974), Finnish actor
