= Golden Fleece Tunnel (California) =

The Golden Fleece Tunnel, is a gold mining site in the Westville gold mining district in Placer County, California. The mine is located 2 miles northeast of the former mining town Westville, California, north to the Foresthill Divide Road. It has a 3,000 ft (910 m) tunnel and was operated successfully by the Golden Fleece Mining and Milling Company (New York). The mine is no longer in operation. Other nearby mines are the Hogsback Tunnel and the Union Tunnel.

Other Golden Fleece mines include:

- Golden Fleece Mine (Colorado).
- Golden Fleece Mine, San Bernardino County, California, near Essex, is a mining site with several tunnels and a central mill, not in production anymore 34.6248°N 115.1721°W.
