= 1979 Ice Hockey World Championships =

1979 edition of the World Ice Hockey Championships

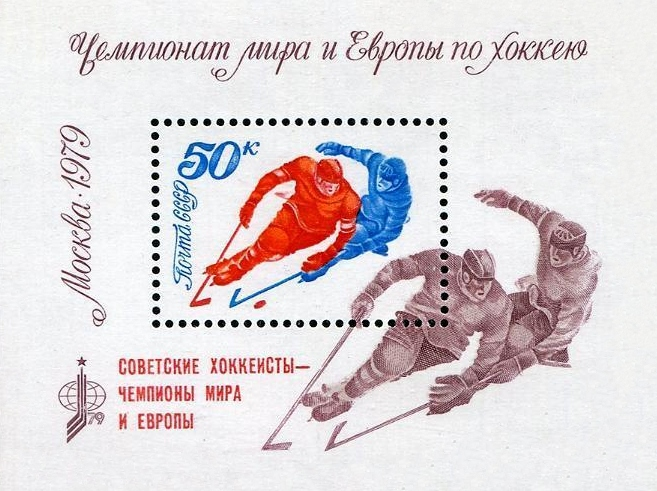
- Soviet stamp sheet dedicated to the 1979 World Ice Hockey Championships

Tournament details
- Host country: Soviet Union
- Venues: 2 (in 1 host city)
- Dates: 14–27 April
- Teams: 8

Final positions
- Champions: Soviet Union (16th title)
- Runners-up: Czechoslovakia
- Third place: Sweden
- Fourth place: Canada

Tournament statistics
- Games played: 32
- Goals scored: 263 (8.22 per game)
- Attendance: 354,500 (11,078 per game)
- Scoring leader: (Soviet Union) Vladimir Petrov 15 points

The 1979 Ice Hockey World Championships took place at the Palace of Sports of the Central Lenin Stadium in Moscow, Soviet Union from 14 to 27 April. Eight teams took part, with the first round split into two groups of four, and the best two from each group advancing to the final group. The four best teams then played each other twice in the final round. This was the 46th World Championship and at the same time, the 57th European Championship. In the May 1978 congress many rules were aligned with NHL practices and archaic rules (like changing ends half way the third period) were finally officially abandoned. The games were very well attended, setting a record by averaging over eleven thousand spectators per game.

The Soviets wished the tournament to be finished before the May Day celebrations began, so the schedule was moved up one week allowing for less NHL players being eligible. The hosts won all seven games they played capturing their 16th title, the only game that was even close was their early match with West Germany, which they won three to two. The competition for the bronze (at least) was tight with Sweden edging out the Canadians. After the tournament NHL star Marcel Dionne praised the level of play and offered the following criticism of North American play, "only the media can change things here. Tell them how the European teams play with so much talent. Tell them that they play without a fight. Let them realize that if a kid does not know how to skate and shoot, but just to fight, he should not be allowed to be a hockey player. There are so many idiots who run hockey, so stupid, so stupid. Tell them."

Promotion and relegation was effective for 1981 as the IIHF ceased running a championship in Olympic years. Nations that did not participate in the Lake Placid Olympics were invited to compete in the inaugural Thayer Tutt Trophy.

== World Championship Group A (Soviet Union) ==
=== First round ===
Results between countries that moved on to the same group in the second round were carried forward.

=== Group 1 ===
Pos	Team	Pld	W	D	L	GF	GA	GD	Pts
1	Soviet Union	3	3	0	0	19	5	+14	6
2	Sweden	3	2	0	1	16	17	−1	4
3	West Germany	3	0	1	2	8	13	−5	1
4	Poland	3	0	1	2	8	16	−8	1

14 April	Soviet Union	7-0	Poland

14 April	Sweden	7-3	West Germany

15 April	Sweden	6-5	Poland

15 April	Soviet Union	3-2	West Germany

17 April	West Germany	3-3	Poland

17 April	Soviet Union	9-3	Sweden

=== Group 2 ===
Pos	Team	Pld	W	D	L	GF	GA	GD	Pts
1	Czechoslovakia	3	2	1	0	11	3	+8	5
2	Canada	3	2	0	1	12	11	+1	4
3	United States	3	0	2	1	6	9	−3	2
4	Finland	3	0	1	2	5	11	−6	1

14 April	Canada	6-3	United States

14 April	Czechoslovakia	5-0	Finland

15 April	Czechoslovakia	4-1	Canada

15 April	United States	1-1	Finland

17 April	Canada	5-4	Finland

17 April	Czechoslovakia	2-2	United States

=== Final round ===
Pos	Team	Pld	W	D	L	GF	GA	GD	Pts
1	Soviet Union	6	6	0	0	51	12	+39	12
2	Czechoslovakia	6	3	1	2	25	30	−5	7
3	Sweden	6	1	1	4	20	38	−18	3
4	Canada	6	1	0	5	20	36	−16	2

19 April	Soviet Union	5-2	Canada

19 April	Czechoslovakia	3-3	Sweden

21 April	Sweden	5-3	Canada

21 April	Soviet Union	11-1	Czechoslovakia

23 April	Czechoslovakia	10-6	Canada

23 April	Soviet Union	11-3	Sweden

25 April	Soviet Union	9-2	Canada

25 April	Czechoslovakia	6-3	Sweden

27 April	Canada	6-3	Sweden

27 April	Soviet Union	6-1	Czechoslovakia

=== Consolation round ===
Pos	Team	Pld	W	D	L	GF	GA	GD	Pts
5	Finland	6	4	1	1	23	17	+6	9
6	West Germany	6	3	1	2	27	21	+6	7
7	United States	6	2	2	2	22	20	+2	6
8	Poland	6	0	2	4	15	29	−14	2

18 April	Poland	5-5	United States

18 April	Finland	5-2	West Germany

20 April	Poland	3-4	Finland

20 April	West Germany	6-3	United States

22 April	United States	6-2	Finland

22 April	West Germany	8-1	Poland

24 April	United States	5-1	Poland

24 April	Finland	7-3	West Germany

26 April	Finland	4-2	Poland

26 April	West Germany	5-2	United States

== World Championship Group B (Romania) ==
Played in Galați March 16–24. This year's tournament was expanded to ten teams to try to avoid hostilities between China and South Korea, and to address a complaint by the Danes that Austria had used an ineligible player in achieving promotion in 1978. China and Denmark were both elevated with the consequence that four teams would be relegated.

=== First round ===
The ten teams were split into groups of five, the top two of each battled for promotion to Group A, the next two played in a group to decide fifth through eighth, and both bottom place teams were simply relegated without playing further. Additionally, the top two in each group joined all Group A teams at the Lake Placid Olympics.

=== Group 1 ===
Pos	Team	Pld	W	D	L	GF	GA	GD	Pts
1	East Germany	4	4	0	0	30	6	+24	8
2	Romania	4	2	1	1	22	16	+6	5
3	Austria	4	2	1	1	15	20	−5	5
4	Denmark	4	1	0	3	8	18	−10	2
5	Hungary	4	0	0	4	10	25	−15	0

Hungary was relegated to Group C.

16 March	Hungary	2-10	East Germany

16 March	Romania	7-7	Austria

17 March	Austria	4-3	Hungary

17 March	Denmark	1-9	East Germany

18 March	Romania	4-1	Denmark

19 March	Romania	8-4	Hungary

19 March	Austria	0-7	East Germany

20 March	Hungary	1-3	Denmark

21 March	Austria	4-3	Denmark

21 March	Romania	3-4	East Germany

=== Group 2 ===
Pos	Team	Pld	W	D	L	GF	GA	GD	Pts
1	Netherlands	4	4	0	0	29	8	+21	8
2	Norway	4	3	0	1	16	13	+3	6
3	Switzerland	4	2	0	2	13	17	−4	4
4	Japan	4	1	0	3	20	17	+3	2
5	China	4	0	0	4	8	31	−23	0

China was relegated to Group C.

16 March	Norway	5-1	Switzerland

16 March	Japan	5-6	Netherlands

17 March	Netherlands	8-1	Norway

17 March	China	4-6	Switzerland

18 March	Japan	9-3	China

19 March	Japan	3-4	Norway

19 March	Netherlands	5-2	Switzerland

20 March	Norway	6-1	China

21 March	Netherlands	10-0	China

21 March	Japan	3-4	Switzerland

=== Final round ===
Pos	Team	Pld	W	D	L	GF	GA	GD	Pts
9	Netherlands	3	3	0	0	15	6	+9	6
10	East Germany	3	2	0	1	16	9	+7	4
11	Romania	3	1	0	2	8	9	−1	2
12	Norway	3	0	0	3	5	20	−15	0

The Netherlands were promoted to Group A.

23 March	East Germany	9-2	Norway

23 March	Romania	2-3	Netherlands

24 March	East Germany	3-4	Netherlands

24 March	Romania	3-2	Norway

=== Consolation round ===
Pos	Team	Pld	W	D	L	GF	GA	GD	Pts
13	Switzerland	3	3	0	0	14	6	+8	6
14	Japan	3	2	0	1	17	10	+7	4
15	Austria	3	1	0	2	8	13	−5	2
16	Denmark	3	0	0	3	8	18	−10	0

Both Austria and Denmark were relegated to Group C.

23 March	Denmark	1-3	Switzerland

23 March	Austria	2-3	Japan

24 March	Denmark	4-11	Japan

24 March	Austria	2-7	Switzerland

== World Championship Group C (Spain) ==
Played in Barcelona March 16–25. This tournament was supposed to be played in China but the Chinese said that they would deny entrance to the South Korean team. To avoid political issues with the two playing each other, both China and Denmark (last year's 3rd and 4th place teams) were elevated to Group B and two extra nations were allowed to participate in Group C.

Pos	Team	Pld	W	D	L	GF	GA	GD	Pts
19	Yugoslavia	7	7	0	0	83	10	+73	14
20	Italy	7	6	0	1	64	17	+47	12
21	France	7	5	0	2	59	27	+32	10
22	Bulgaria	7	4	0	3	35	28	+7	8
23	Great Britain	7	2	0	5	23	68	−45	4
24	Spain	7	2	0	5	25	48	−23	4
25	South Korea	7	1	1	5	16	67	−51	3
26	Australia	7	0	1	6	13	53	−40	1

Both Yugoslavia and Italy were promoted to Group B.

16 March	Spain	7-1	South Korea

16 March	Bulgaria	0-3	France

16 March	Great Britain	0-12	Italy

16 March	Australia	0-10	Yugoslavia

17 March	Australia	4-12	Italy

17 March	France	5-7	Yugoslavia

18 March	South Korea	9-6	Great Britain

18 March	Bulgaria	5-4	Spain

19 March	France	9-3	Australia

19 March	Great Britain	2-4	Bulgaria

19 March	Yugoslavia	18-0	South Korea

19 March	Spain	1-10	Italy

20 March	Australia	3-5	Great Britain

20 March	Italy	11-0	South Korea

21 March	Bulgaria	1-7	Yugoslavia

21 March	France	8-2	Spain

22 March	South Korea	0-0	Australia

22 March	Italy	8-4	Bulgaria

22 March	Great Britain	3-15	France

22 March	Yugoslavia	16-1	Spain

24 March	Spain	4-6	Great Britain

24 March	Yugoslavia	4-2	Italy

24 March	South Korea	3-15	France

24 March	Australia	1-11	Bulgaria

25 March	Great Britain	1-21	Yugoslavia

25 March	France	4-9	Italy

25 March	South Korea	3-10	Bulgaria

25 March	Spain	6-2	Australia

== Ranking and statistics ==
1979 IIHF World Championship winners

Soviet Union
16th title

=== Tournament Awards ===
- Best players selected by the directorate:
  - Best Goaltender: (Soviet Union) Vladislav Tretiak
  - Best Defenceman: (Soviet Union) Valeri Vasiliev
  - Best Forward: (Canada) Wilf Paiement
- Media All-Star Team:
  - Goaltender: (Soviet Union) Vladislav Tretiak
  - Defence: (Czechoslovakia) Jiří Bubla, (Soviet Union) Valeri Vasiliev
  - Forwards: (Soviet Union) Sergei Makarov, (Soviet Union) Boris Mikhailov, (Soviet Union) Vladimir Petrov

=== Final standings ===
The final standings of the tournament according to IIHF:

1st place, gold medalist(s)	Soviet Union
2nd place, silver medalist(s)	Czechoslovakia
3rd place, bronze medalist(s)	Sweden
4	Canada
5	Finland
6	West Germany
7	United States
8	Poland

=== European championships final standings ===
The final standings of the European championships according to IIHF:

Gold medal	Soviet Union
Silver medal	Czechoslovakia
Bronze medal	Sweden
4	Finland
5	West Germany
6	Poland
