= Golden ram =

Golden ram or Golden Ram may refer to:

== Culture ==
- Chrysomallos, mythical golden-fleeced ram
- The Golden Ram, name for the Russian Guild of Film Critics awards from 1998 ton 2004

== Mascots ==
- West Chester Golden Rams of West Chester University of Pennsylvania
- Albany State Golden Rams of Albany State University
- Golden Rams of Spring-Ford Area School District

== See also ==
- Gold ram, a variety of Ram cichlid, a freshwater fish
- Golden Fleece (disambiguation)
