= 1980 Thayer Tutt Trophy =

The 1980 Thayer Tutt Trophy was the first edition of the Thayer Tutt Trophy. It was held from March 8–16, 1980 in Ljubljana, Yugoslavia (present-day Slovenia). Switzerland finished first, East Germany finished second, and Yugoslavia finished third.

== First round ==
=== Group A ===
Pl.	Team	GP	W	T	L	Goals	Pts
1.	Yugoslavia	4	2	2	0	25:13	6
2.	Austria	4	2	1	1	21:18	5
3.	China	4	1	2	1	19:16	4
4.	Italy	4	0	3	1	15:16	3
5.	Bulgaria	4	1	0	3	10:27	2

=== Group B ===
Pl.	Team	GP	W	T	L	Goals	Pts
1.	Switzerland	4	4	0	0	28:12	8
2.	East Germany	4	3	0	1	49:8	6
3.	Hungary	4	1	1	2	17:29	3
4.	France	4	1	0	3	11:42	2
5.	Denmark	4	0	1	3	12:26	1

== Final round ==
=== Championship round ===
(games against previous opponents carried over from first round)

Pl.	Team	GP	W	T	L	Goals	Pts
1.	Switzerland	3	2	1	0	11:5	5
2.	East Germany	3	2	0	1	12:6	4
3.	Yugoslavia	3	1	1	1	13:8	3
4.	Austria	3	0	0	3	3:20	0

=== Placing round ===
(games against previous opponents carried over from first round)

Pl.	Team	GP	W	T	L	Goals	Pts
5.	Italy	3	2	1	0	21:8	5
6.	Hungary	3	2	0	1	14:12	4
7.	France	3	1	0	2	16:21	2
8.	China	3	0	1	2	9:19	1
