= 1984 Thayer Tutt Trophy =

The 1984 Thayer Tutt Trophy was the second edition of the Thayer Tutt Trophy. It was held from March 20–29, 1984 in Briançon, Gap, Grenoble, and Villard-de-Lans, France. East Germany finished first, Switzerland finished second, and Romania finished third.

== Results ==
=== Final table ===
Pl.	Team	GP	W	T	L	Goals	Pts
1.	East Germany	7	6	1	0	58:19	13
2.	Switzerland	7	6	0	1	43:19	12
3.	Romania	7	4	1	2	40:38	9
4.	Netherlands	7	4	1	2	30:22	9
5.	Hungary	7	2	0	5	23:44	4
6.	Japan	7	1	1	5	27:41	3
7.	France	7	1	1	5	26:39	3
8.	China	7	1	1	5	25:50	3
