= Thayer Tutt Trophy =

Ice Hockey Competition

- Status: inactive
- Genre: sports event
- Date: March
- Frequency: every fourth year
- Location: various
- Inaugurated: 1980
- Most recent: 1988
- Organiser: IIHF

The Thayer Tutt Trophy was an international ice hockey tournament contested in 1980, 1984, and 1988 for national teams that did not qualify for the Olympic Games.

The tournament was named after William Thayer Tutt, who was the president of the International Ice Hockey Federation from 1966 to 1969.

== Results ==
Year	Host	(gold) Gold	(silver) Silver	(bronze) Bronze
1980; Details	(Socialist Federal Republic of Yugoslavia) Ljubljana	Switzerland	East Germany	Yugoslavia
1984; Details	(France) Grenoble	East Germany	Switzerland	Romania
1988; Details	(Netherlands) Eindhoven, Tilburg	Italy	Japan	Netherlands
