= Cristiano DiGiacinto =

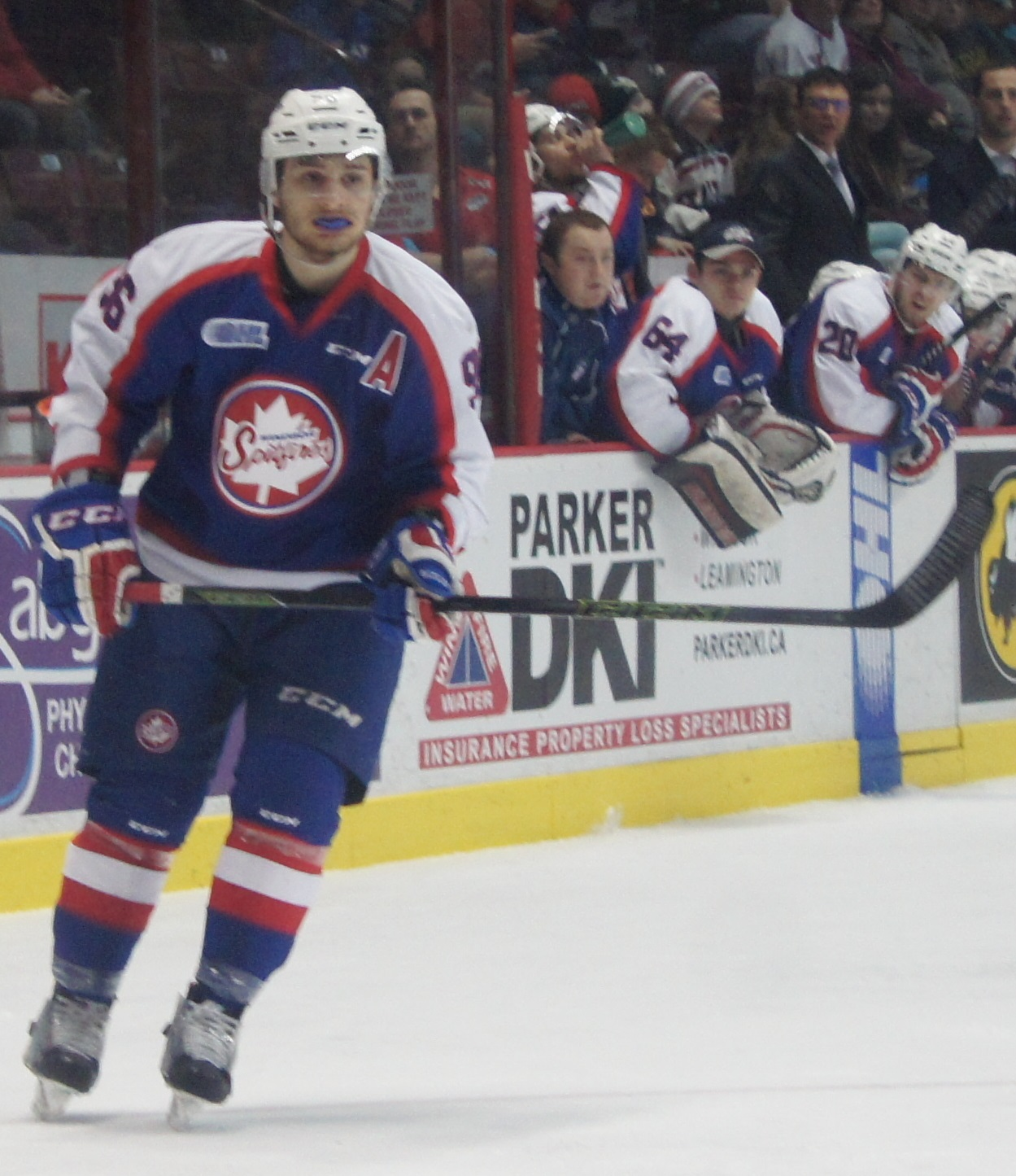
- DiGiacinto with the Windsor Spitfires in 2016
- Born: January 10, 1996 (age 30) Hamilton, Ontario, Canada
- Height: 5 ft 11 in (180 cm)
- Weight: 183 lb (83 kg; 13 st 1 lb)
- Position: Forward
- Shoots: Left
- ICEHL team Former teams: HC Bolzano; Hartford Wolf Pack
- National team: Italy
- NHL draft: 170th overall, 2014; Tampa Bay Lightning
- Playing career: 2017–present

Cristiano DiGiacinto (born January 10, 1996) is an Italian-Canadian professional ice hockey player who is a forward for HC Bozen–Bolzano of the ICE Hockey League (ICEHL).

== Playing career ==
DiGiacinto is from Hamilton, Ontario, and played AAA hockey for the Hamilton Reps and Hamilton Huskies. After going unselected in the OHL Draft, and being cut from Erie Otters training camp, he played for the Hamilton Red Wings, before being signed by the Windsor Spitfires in October 2013. On January 12, 2014, DiGiacinto checked Erie Otters player André Burakovsky in the head and received an eight-game suspension. On March 22, 2014, DiGiacinto instigated a fight with London Knights player Gemel Smith and was suspended for five games.

He was drafted by the Tampa Bay Lightning in the sixth round (170th overall) of the 2014 NHL entry draft.

On February 19, 2017, DiGiacinto checked Guelph Storm player Nic Sicoly in the head and received a ten-game suspension.

== International play ==
DiGiacinto represented the Italy national team at the 2026 Winter Olympics. On 13 February 2026, DiGiacinto delivered an illegal check to the head of Slovakia's Martin Fehérváry and received a one-game suspension.

== Personal life ==
DiGiacinto is of Italian descent.

== Career statistics ==
=== Regular season and playoffs ===
			Regular season					Playoffs
Season	Team	League	GP	G	A	Pts	PIM	GP	G	A	Pts	PIM
2010–11	Hamilton Reps U16 AAA	Alliance U16	0	0	0	0	0	1	0	0	0	0
2011–12	Hamilton Reps U16 AAA	Alliance U16	15	6	6	12	48	8	0	2	2	32
2011–12	Hamilton Reps U18 AAA	Alliance U18	0	0	0	0	0	2	1	0	1	6
2012–13	Hamilton Huskies U18 AAA	Alliance U18	29	22	19	41	52	5	3	3	6	6
2013–14	Hamilton Red Wings	OJHL	9	8	3	11	37	—	—	—	—	—
2013–14	Windsor Spitfires	OHL	50	17	11	28	101	2	0	0	0	9
2014–15	Windsor Spitfires	OHL	63	21	24	45	100	—	—	—	—	—
2015–16	Windsor Spitfires	OHL	63	16	26	42	107	5	0	1	1	2
2016–17	Windsor Spitfires	OHL	47	13	21	34	61	7	1	2	3	13
2017–18	Jacksonville Icemen	ECHL	12	1	5	6	30	—	—	—	—	—
2017–18	Acadia University	U Sports	12	1	5	6	14	10	3	6	9	14
2018–19	Acadia University	U Sports	25	6	4	10	96	3	2	0	2	2
2019–20	Acadia University	U Sports	30	20	17	37	80	7	5	1	6	10
2020–21	Acadia University	U Sports	0	0	0	0	0	—	—	—	—	—
2021–22	Hartford Wolf Pack	AHL	47	6	7	13	47	—	—	—	—	—
2022–23	Hartford Wolf Pack	AHL	36	3	9	12	44	—	—	—	—	—
2022–23	Jacksonville Icemen	ECHL	19	5	10	15	24	12	1	2	3	14
2023–24	Hartford Wolf Pack	AHL	9	1	1	2	2	—	—	—	—	—
2023–24	Cincinnati Cyclones	ECHL	21	5	12	17	31	—	—	—	—	—
2023–24	HC Bolzano	ICEHL	5	0	1	1	2	10	2	4	6	8
2024–25	HC Bolzano	ICEHL	48	13	18	31	33	11	0	4	4	13
2025–26	HC Bolzano	ICEHL	46	8	14	22	49	5	2	0	2	22
AHL totals			92	10	17	27	93	—	—	—	—	—
ICEHL totals			99	21	33	54	84	26	4	8	12	43

=== International ===
Year	Team	Event	GP	G	A	Pts	PIM
2026	Italy	OG	3	0	0	0	2
2026	Italy	WC	5	0	0	0	2
Senior totals			8	0	0	0	4
