= The Golden Fleecing (disambiguation) =

The Golden Fleecing may refer to:

- The Golden Fleecing, a Scrooge McDuck comic book story
- The Golden Fleecing (DuckTales episode), a DuckTales episode
- The Golden Fleecing (film), a 1940 film, directed by Leslie Fenton
- The Golden Fleecing, an episode of Top Cat where Benny becomes infatuated with a showgirl

== See also ==
- Golden Fleece (disambiguation)
