= France men's national ice hockey team =

Men's national ice hockey team representing France

France
- Nickname: Les Bleus (The Blues)
- Association: Fédération Française de Hockey sur Glace
- General manager: Renaud Jacquin
- Head coach: Yorick Treille
- Assistants: Luc Tardif Jr.; Ivano Zanatta
- Captain: Jordann Perret
- Most games: Denis Perez (297)
- Top scorer: Philippe Bozon (115)
- Most points: Philippe Bozon (170)
- Team colors
- IIHF code: FRA
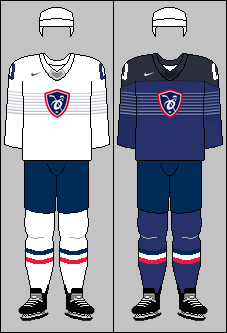

Ranking
- Current IIHF: 15 ▼2 (3 June 2026)
- Highest IIHF: 12 (2014–15, 2018)
- Lowest IIHF: 19 (2006–07)

First international
- Belgium 3–0 France (Brussels, Belgium; 4 March 1905)

Biggest win
- France 24–1 North Korea (Budapest, Hungary; 15 March 1983)

Biggest defeat
- United States 22–0 France (Chamonix, France; 30 January 1924)

Olympics
- Appearances: 10 (first in 1920)

IIHF World Championships
- Appearances: 62 (first in 1930)
- Best result: 6th (1930)

European Championships
- Appearances: 4 (first in 1923)
- Best result: (1924)

International record (W–L–T)
- 501–678–91

The France men's national ice hockey team has participated in the IIHF European Championships, the IIHF World Hockey Championships and the Olympic Games. As of 2016, it is ranked 14th in the world in the IIHF World Rankings. The team is overseen by the Fédération Française de Hockey sur Glace. Notable recent wins include upsets against Russia at the 2013 IIHF World Championship, Canada at the 2014 IIHF World Championship, and a triumphant 5–1 over Finland as the tournament host of 2017 IIHF World Championship.

Patrick Francheterre coached the national team in 1985 and 1986, then managed the team from 1993 to 1997 and from 2004 to 2014, and received the Paul Loicq Award in 2017.

== Tournament record ==
=== Olympic Games ===
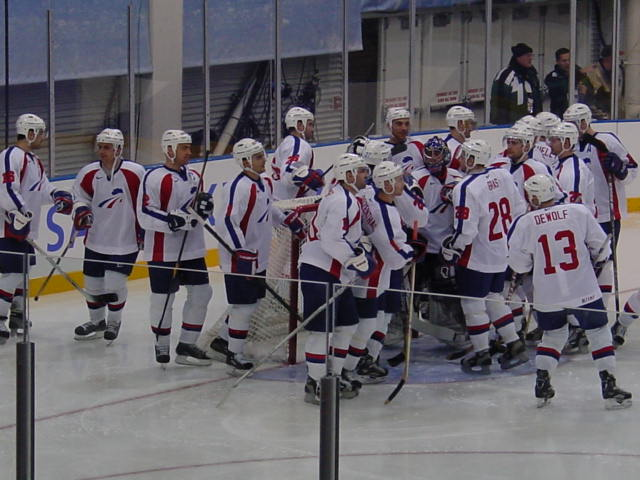
The French team at the 2002 Winter Olympics

Games	Finish
(Belgium) 1920 Antwerp	5th place (tied)
(France) 1924 Chamonix	6th place
(Switzerland) 1928 St. Moritz	5th place
(Germany) 1936 Garmisch-Partenkirchen	9th place
(France) 1968 Grenoble	14th place
(United States) 1980 Lake Placid	did not qualify, took part in Thayer Tutt Trophy
(Socialist Federal Republic of Yugoslavia) 1984 Sarajevo	did not qualify, took part in Thayer Tutt Trophy
(Canada) 1988 Calgary	11th place
(France) 1992 Albertville	8th place
(Norway) 1994 Lillehammer	10th place
(Japan) 1998 Nagano	11th place
(United States) 2002 Salt Lake City	14th place
(Italy) 2026 Milan / Cortina d'Ampezzo	11th place
(France) 2030 French Alps	Qualified as hosts

=== World Championship ===
See: Ice Hockey World Championships and List of IIHF World Championship medalists
Note: Between 1920 and 1968, the Olympic hockey tournament was also considered the World Championship for that year. World Championship tournaments were not held in the Olympic years of 1980, 1984, and 1988.

Championship	Finish	Rank
(France) / (Austria) / (Germany) 1930 Chamonix/Vienna/Berlin	First round	6th
(Poland) 1931 Krynica-Zdrój	Consolation round	9th
(Italy) 1934 Milan	Consolation round	11th
(Switzerland) 1935 Davos	Consolation round	7th
(United Kingdom) 1937 London	Consolation round	7th
(United Kingdom) 1950 London	Consolation round	9th
(France) 1951 Paris	2nd in the Pool B	9th
(Belgium) 1952 Liege	6th in the Pool B	15th
(Switzerland) 1953 Zürich/Basel	5th in the Pool B	8th
(Switzerland) 1961 Geneva/Lausanne	2nd in the Pool C	16th
(United States) 1962 Denver/Colorado Springs	3rd in the Pool B	11th
(Sweden) 1963 Stockholm	6th in the Pool B	14th
(Finland) 1965 Tampere	9th in the Pool B	17th
(Romania) 1966 Bucharest	Qualifying round Group B/C	—
(Austria) 1967 Vienna	4th in the Pool C	20th
(Romania) 1970 Galaţi	3rd in the Pool C	17th
(Netherlands) 1971 Eindhoven	2nd in the Pool C	16th
(Netherlands) 1973 Geleen/Rotterdam/Nijmegen/Utrecht/Tilburg/The Hague	6th in the Pool C	20th
(France) 1974 Grenoble/Gap/Lyon	5th in the Pool C	19th
(Bulgaria) 1975 Sofia	5th in the Pool C	19th
(Poland) 1976 Gdańsk	3rd in the Pool C	19th
(Denmark) 1977 Copenhagen/Hørsholm	4th in the Pool C	21st
(Spain) 1978 Canary Islands	6th in the Pool B	22nd
(Spain) 1979 Barcelona	3rd in the Pool C	21st
(China) 1981 Beijing	5th in the Pool C	21st
(Spain) 1982 Jaca	4th in the Pool C	20th
(Hungary) 1983 Budapest	5th in the Pool C	21st
(France) 1985 Megève/Chamonix/Saint-Gervais	1st in the Pool C	17th
(Netherlands) 1986 Eindhoven	4th in the Pool B	12th
(Italy) 1987 Canazei	4th in the Pool B	12th
(Norway) 1989 Oslo/Lillehammer	3rd in the Pool B	11th
(France) 1990 Lyon/Megève	4th in the Pool B	12th
(Socialist Federal Republic of Yugoslavia) 1991 Ljubljana/Bled/Jesenice	3rd in the Pool B	11th
(Czechoslovakia) 1992 Prague/Bratislava	Consolation round	11th
(Germany) 1993 Munich/Dortmund	Consolation round	10th
(Italy) 1994 Bolzano/Canazei/Milan	First round	10th
(Sweden) 1995 Stockholm	Quarterfinals	8th
(Austria) 1996 Vienna	Consolation round	11th
(Finland) 1997 Helsinki/Tampere/Turku	Consolation round	10th
(Switzerland) 1998 Zürich/Basel	First round	13th
(Norway) 1999 Hamar/Lillehammer	Qualifying Round	15th
(Russia) 2000 Saint Petersburg	Consolation round	15th
(France) 2001 Grenoble	2nd in Division I, Group A	20th
(Netherlands) 2002 Eindhoven	2nd in Division I, Group A	19th
(Croatia) 2003 Zagreb	1st in Division I, Group B	18st
(Czech Republic) 2004 Prague/Ostrava	Relegation round	16th
(Netherlands) 2005 Eindhoven	2nd in Division I, Group B	19th
(France) 2006 Amiens	2nd in Division I, Group A	20th
(China) 2007 Qiqihar	1st in Division I, Group A	18th
(Canada) 2008 Halifax/Quebec	Relegation round	14th
(Switzerland) 2009 Bern/Schluefweg/Kloten	Qualifying round	12th
(Germany) 2010 Cologne/Mannheim/Gelsenkirchen	Relegation round	14th
(Slovakia) 2011 Bratislava/Košice	Qualifying round	12th
(Finland) / (Sweden) 2012 Helsinki/Stockholm	Preliminary round	9th
(Sweden) / (Finland) 2013 Stockholm/Helsinki	Preliminary round	13th
(Belarus) 2014 Minsk	Quarterfinals	8th
(Czech Republic) 2015 Prague/Ostrava	Preliminary round	12th
(Russia) 2016 Moscow/Saint Petersburg	Preliminary round	14th
(Germany) / (France) 2017 Cologne/Paris	Preliminary round	9th
(Denmark) 2018 Copenhagen/Herning	Preliminary round	12th
(Slovakia) 2019 Bratislava/Košice	Relegation (but was later promoted back after Russia and Belarus were disqualified due to the invasion of Ukraine)	15th
~~(Slovenia) 2020 Ljubljana~~	Cancelled due to the COVID-19 pandemic	
~~(Slovenia) 2021 Ljubljana~~	Cancelled due to the COVID-19 pandemic	
(Finland) 2022 Tampere/Helsinki	Preliminary round	12th
(Finland) / (Latvia) 2023 Tampere/Riga	Preliminary round	12th
(Czech Republic) 2024 Prague/Ostrava	Preliminary round	14th
(Sweden) / (Denmark) 2025 Stockholm/Herning	Preliminary round	16th
(Poland) 2026 Sosnowiec	3rd in Division I, Group A	19th
(Estonia) 2027 Tallinn	Division I, Group A	

=== European Championship ===
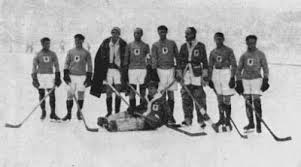
The French ice hockey team, 1924

Games	GP	W	T	L	GF	GA	Finish	Rank
1910–1922	did not participate							
(Belgium) 1923 Antwerp	4	3	0	1	13	8	Round-robin	2nd place, silver medalist(s)
(Italy) 1924 Milan	3	3	0	0	17	1	Final	1st place, gold medalist(s)
(Czechoslovakia) 1925 Štrbské Pleso, Starý Smokovec	did not participate							
(Switzerland) 1926 Davos	4	2	0	2	5	6	Second round	5th
(Austria) 1927 Wien	did not participate							
(Hungary) 1929 Budapest	did not participate							
(Germany) 1932 Berlin	4	2	2	0	10	4	Consolation round	6th

== 2026 Olympics roster ==
The first six players of France's roster were announced on 16 June 2025. France's full roster was later revealed on 23 December 2025. Pierre-Édouard Bellemare served as France's captain, continuing in the role from Olympic qualifiers in 2024. Yohann Auvitu, Stéphane Da Costa, and Alexandre Texier served as alternate captains.

Head coach: Yorick Treille

No.	Pos.	Name	Height	Weight	Birthdate	Team
3	F	Charles Bertrand	1.85 m (6 ft 1 in)	92 kg (203 lb)	5 February 1991 (aged 34)	(Finland) Vaasan Sport
5	D	Enzo Guebey	1.83 m (6 ft 0 in)	88 kg (194 lb)	6 May 1999 (aged 26)	(Switzerland) HC Davos
7	D	Pierre Crinon	1.96 m (6 ft 5 in)	102 kg (225 lb)	2 August 1995 (aged 29)	(France) Brûleurs de Loups
8	D	Hugo Gallet	1.93 m (6 ft 4 in)	93 kg (205 lb)	20 June 1997 (aged 28)	(Finland) KalPa
14	F	Stéphane Da Costa – A	1.80 m (5 ft 11 in)	82 kg (181 lb)	11 July 1989 (aged 36)	(Russia) Avtomobilist Yekaterinburg
18	D	Yohann Auvitu – A	1.83 m (6 ft 0 in)	88 kg (194 lb)	27 July 1989 (aged 36)	(Austria) Black Wings Linz
19	D	Enzo Cantagallo	1.80 m (5 ft 11 in)	85 kg (187 lb)	19 October 1998 (aged 27)	(France) Spartiates de Marseille
24	F	Justin Addamo	1.98 m (6 ft 6 in)	112 kg (247 lb)	27 May 1998 (aged 27)	(Finland) Jukurit
25	F	Nicolas Ritz	1.80 m (5 ft 11 in)	88 kg (194 lb)	26 February 1992 (aged 33)	(France) Ducs d'Angers
27	D	Jules Boscq	1.83 m (6 ft 0 in)	81 kg (179 lb)	22 February 2002 (aged 23)	(France) Boxers de Bordeaux
29	F	Louis Boudon	1.80 m (5 ft 11 in)	85 kg (187 lb)	4 October 1998 (aged 26)	(Finland) Jukurit
30	G	Antoine Keller	1.88 m (6 ft 2 in)	74 kg (163 lb)	6 October 2004 (aged 21)	(Switzerland) HC Ajoie
33	G	Julian Junca	1.96 m (6 ft 5 in)	97 kg (214 lb)	15 February 1998 (aged 27)	(Slovakia) Dukla Trenčín
36	G	Martin Neckar	1.83 m (6 ft 0 in)	80 kg (176 lb)	12 September 2005 (aged 20)	(Switzerland) SCL Tigers
41	F	Pierre-Édouard Bellemare – C	1.83 m (6 ft 0 in)	84 kg (185 lb)	6 March 1985 (aged 40)	(Switzerland) HC Ajoie
62	D	Florian Chakiachvili	1.85 m (6 ft 1 in)	86 kg (190 lb)	18 March 1992 (aged 33)	(France) Dragons de Rouen
72	F	Jordann Perret	1.78 m (5 ft 10 in)	81 kg (179 lb)	15 October 1994 (aged 31)	(Czech Republic) Mountfield HK
74	D	Thomas Thiry	1.91 m (6 ft 3 in)	105 kg (231 lb)	9 September 1997 (aged 27)	(Switzerland) HC Ajoie
77	F	Sacha Treille	1.91 m (6 ft 3 in)	80 kg (176 lb)	6 November 1987 (aged 37)	(France) Brûleurs de Loups
78	F	Dylan Fabre	1.78 m (5 ft 10 in)	78 kg (172 lb)	10 November 2000 (aged 24)	(Finland) Porin Ässät
81	F	Anthony Rech	1.80 m (5 ft 11 in)	86 kg (190 lb)	9 July 1992 (aged 32)	(France) Dragons de Rouen
85	F	Alexandre Texier – A	1.85 m (6 ft 1 in)	88 kg (194 lb)	13 September 1999 (aged 26)	(Canada) Montreal Canadiens
90	F	Aurélien Dair	1.88 m (6 ft 2 in)	84 kg (185 lb)	10 September 1999 (aged 25)	(France) Brûleurs de Loups
91	F	Floran Douay	1.91 m (6 ft 3 in)	98 kg (216 lb)	7 February 1995 (aged 30)	(Switzerland) Lausanne HC
95	F	Kévin Bozon	1.88 m (6 ft 2 in)	90 kg (198 lb)	30 December 1995 (aged 29)	(Switzerland) HC Ajoie

== All-time record ==
As of 8 November 2025.

Opponent	Played	Won	Drawn	Lost	GF	GA	GD
Australia	3	3	0	0	32	4	+28
Austria	70	24	10	36	196	264	-68
Belarus	32	9	1	22	59	101	-42
Belgium	53	37	2	14	303	115	+188
Bohemia	1	1	0	0	8	1	+7
Bulgaria	29	18	2	9	156	89	+67
Canada	56	11	5	40	100	252	-152
China	11	6	2	3	67	41	+26
Croatia	4	4	0	0	29	3	+26
Czech Republic	15	1	0	14	29	84	−55
Czechoslovakia	12	1	3	8	22	43	−21
Denmark	86	44	5	37	294	243	+51
East Germany	11	3	0	8	26	58	-32
England	17	12	1	4	53	28	+25
Estonia	4	2	1	1	19	7	+12
Finland	22	1	0	22	29	120	−91
Germany	45	15	4	26	89	131	-42
Great Britain	33	15	3	15	117	130	-13
Hungary	53	22	4	27	207	222	-15
Israel	1	1	0	0	9	0	+9
Italy	92	36	6	50	257	313	-56
Japan	30	17	2	11	120	101	+19
Kazakhstan	19	10	1	8	54	51	+3
Latvia	56	16	4	37	115	195	-80
Lithuania	4	4	0	0	24	8	+16
Netherlands	43	26	4	13	222	159	+63
North Korea	4	4	0	0	65	6	+59
Norway	101	27	14	60	232	343	-111
Poland	54	27	6	21	154	146	+8
Romania	28	12	4	12	114	139	-25
Russia	15	2	0	13	14	75	−61
Slovakia	38	5	3	30	48	167	-119
Slovenia	35	20	1	14	102	80	+22
South Africa	1	1	0	0	11	2	+9
South Korea	4	4	0	0	49	9	+40
Spain	8	8	0	0	70	15	+55
Sweden	23	3	0	20	31	100	−69
Switzerland	69	18	2	49	138	283	-145
Ukraine	17	11	0	6	48	49	-1
United States	26	1	2	23	39	142	−103
Yugoslavia	24	11	0	13	105	115	-10
Total	1 240	490	92	658	3 829	4 400	-571

== Uniform evolution ==
National team jerseys

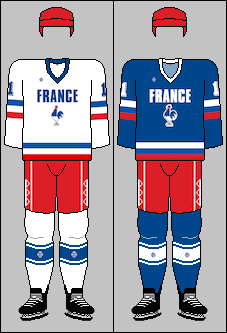
1988 Olympic jersey

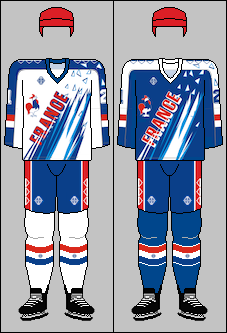
1992 Olympic jersey

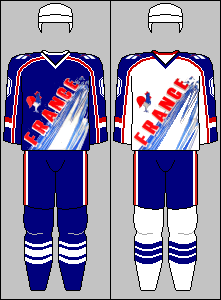
1994 Olympic jersey

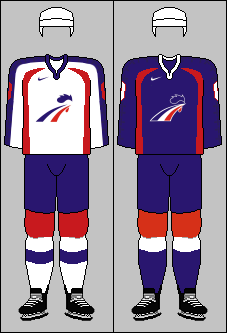
1998–2001 IIHF jerseys

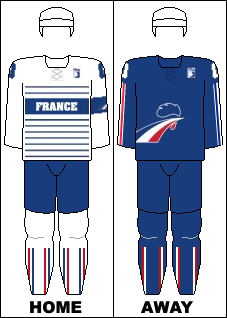
2014–2016 IIHF jerseys

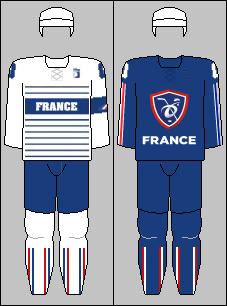
2016–2019 IIHF jerseys

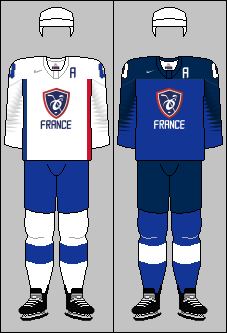
2019–2022 IIHF jerseys

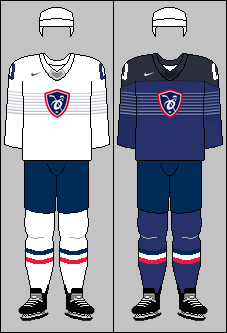
2022– IIHF jerseys
