= Italy men's national ice hockey team =

Men's national ice hockey team representing Italy

Italy
- Nickname: Gli Azzurri (The Blues)
- Association: Federazione Italiana Sport del Ghiaccio
- General manager: Stefan Zisser
- Head coach: Jukka Jalonen
- Assistants: Giorgio de Bettin; Stefan Mair
- Captain: Alex Trivellato
- Most games: Lucio Topatigh (353)
- Top scorer: Alberto Da Rin (123)
- Most points: Bruno Zarrillo (187)
- Team colors
- IIHF code: ITA
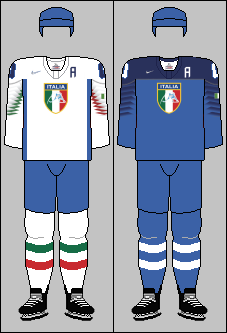

Ranking
- Current IIHF: 16 ▲2 (3 June 2026)
- Highest IIHF: 13 (2007)
- Lowest IIHF: 20 (2024–2025)

First international
- Italy 1–7 Sweden (Milan, Italy; 14 March 1924)

Biggest win
- Italy 28–0 Belgium (Düsseldorf, Germany; 1 March 1955)

Biggest defeat
- United States 31–1 Italy (St. Moritz, Switzerland; 1 February 1948)

Olympics
- Appearances: 10 (first in 1936)

IIHF World Championships
- Appearances: 68 (first in 1930)
- Best result: 4th (1953)

IIHF European Championships
- Appearances: 3 (first in 1924)
- Best result: 4th (1929)

International record (W–L–T)
- 423–543–84

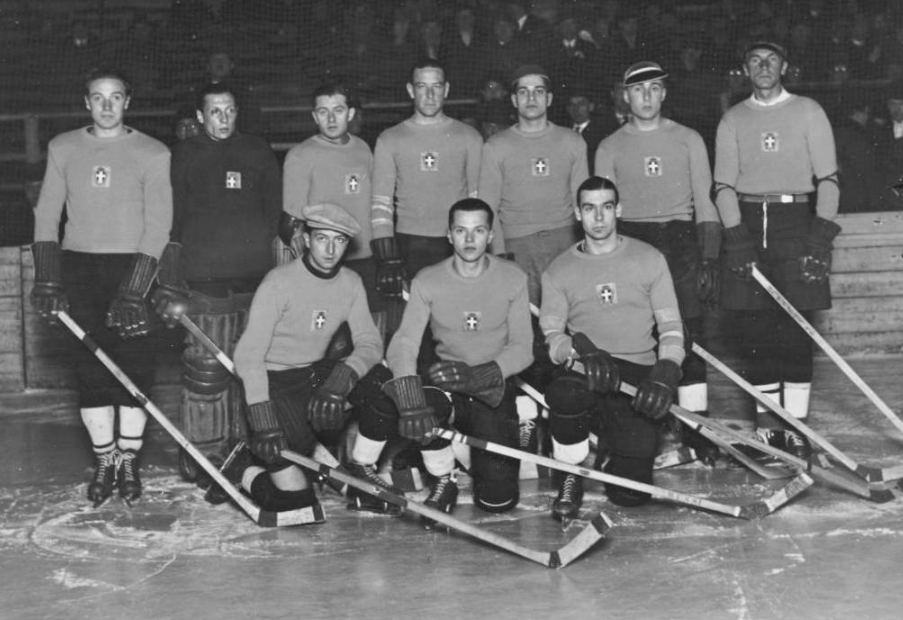
Italy Ice Hockey Team in 1933 World Ice Hockey Championships

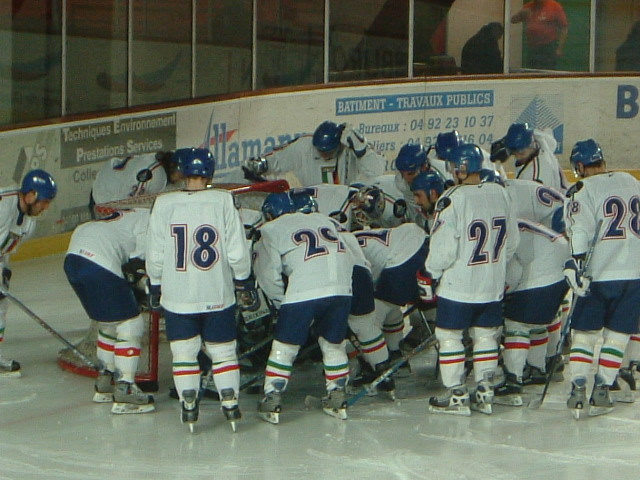
The Blue Team during 2003 Euro Ice Hockey Challenge

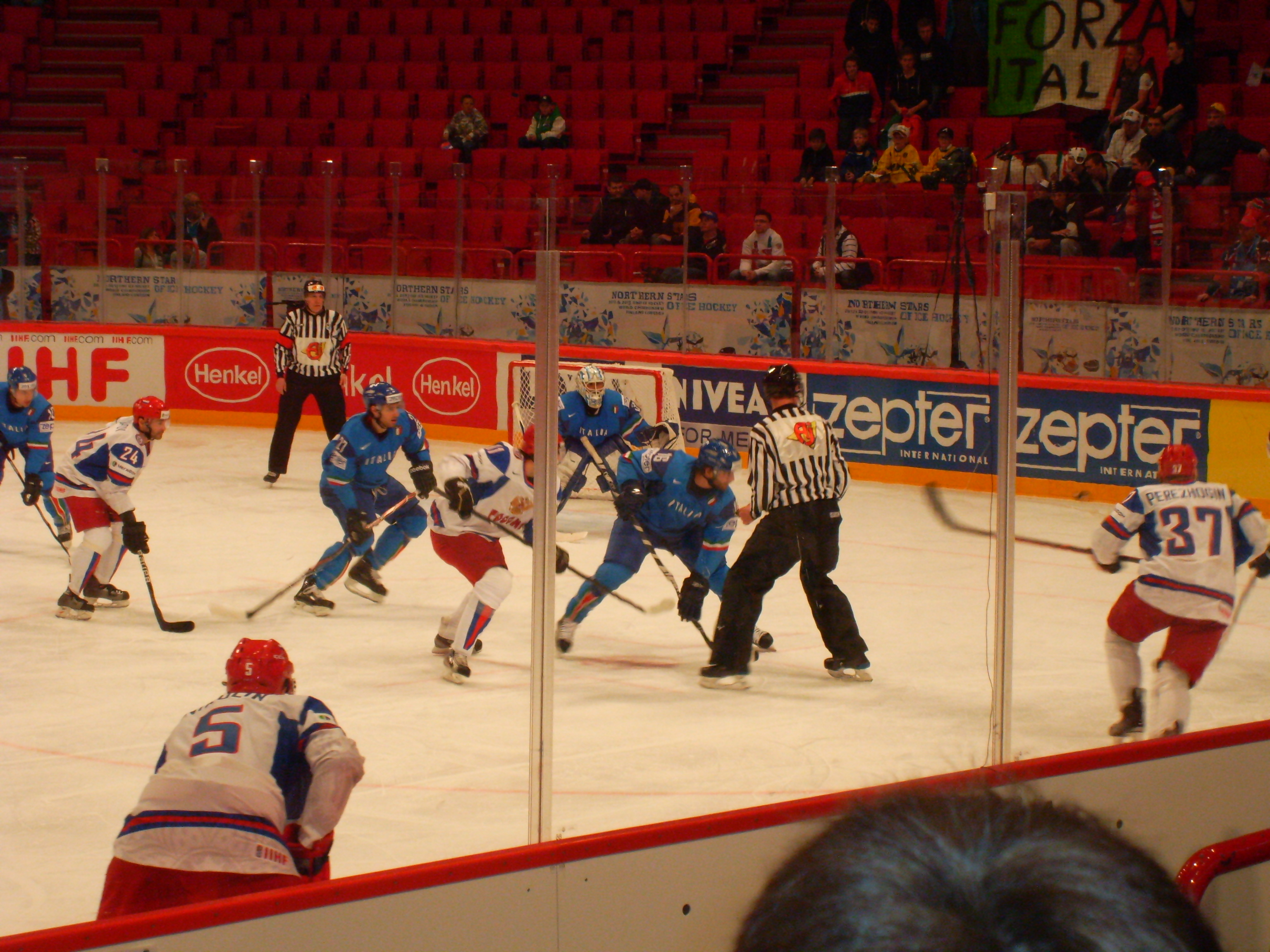
Game between Italy vs Russia.

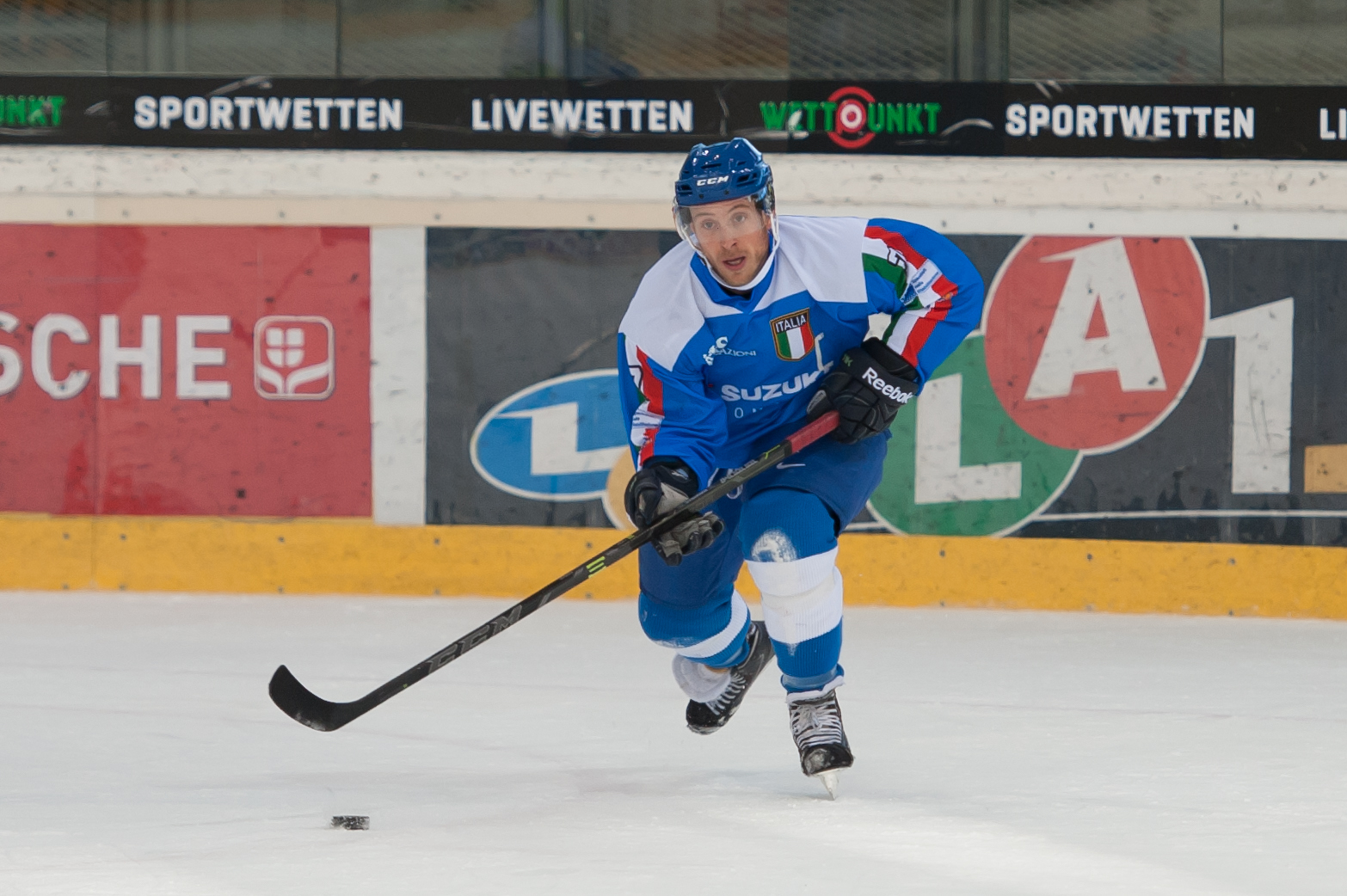
Christian Borgatello in 2015

The Italian men's national ice hockey team is the national ice hockey team of Italy, and is controlled by the Federazione Italiana Sport del Ghiaccio (FISG), a member of the International Ice Hockey Federation.

== Tournament record ==
=== Olympic Games ===
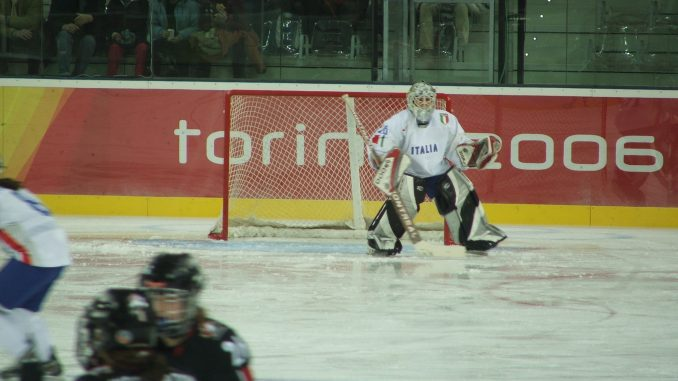
Italian goalkeeper at 2006 Turin Olympics

Games	Head coach	Finish
(Germany) 1936 Garmisch-Partenkirchen	(Italy) Giampiero Medri	9th place
(Switzerland) 1948 St. Moritz	(Switzerland) Othmar Delnon	8th place
(Italy) 1956 Cortina d'Ampezzo	(Switzerland) Bibi Torriani	7th place
(Austria) 1964 Innsbruck	(Czechoslovakia) Slavomír Bartoň	15th place
(United States) 1980 Lake Placid	did not qualify, took part in Thayer Tutt Trophy.	
(Socialist Federal Republic of Yugoslavia) 1984 Sarajevo	(Canada) Ron Ivany	9th place
(Canada) 1988 Calgary	did not qualify, took part in Thayer Tutt Trophy.	
(France) 1992 Albertville	(Canada) Gene Ubriaco	12th place
(Norway) 1994 Lillehammer	(Canada) Bryan Lefley	9th place
(Japan) 1998 Nagano	(Italy) Adolf Insam	12th place
(Italy) 2006 Turin	(Canada) Michel Goulet	11th place
(Italy) 2026 Milan / Cortina d'Ampezzo	(Finland) Jukka Jalonen	12th place

=== World Championship ===
Championship	Finish	Rank
(France) / (Austria) / (Germany) 1930 Chamonix/Vienna/Berlin	First round	10th
(Czechoslovakia) 1933 Prague	Consolation round	11th
(Italy) 1934 Milan	Consolation round	9th
(Switzerland) 1935 Davos	Consolation round	7th
(Germany) 1936 Garmisch-Partenkirchen	First round	9th
(Switzerland) 1939 Zürich/Basel	Consolation round	9th
(Switzerland) 1948 St. Moritz	Final Tournament	9th
(France) 1951 Paris	1st in the Pool B	8th
(Belgium) 1952 Liege	3rd in the Pool B	12th
(Switzerland) 1953 Zürich/Basel	1st in the Pool B	4th
(West Germany) 1955 Krefeld/Dortmund/Cologne	1st in the Pool B	10th
(Italy) 1956 Cortina d'Ampezzo	Consolation round	7th
(Czechoslovakia) 1959 Prague/Bratislava/Brno/Ostrava	Consolation round	10th
(Switzerland) 1961 Geneva/Lausanne	4th in the Pool B	12th
(Austria) 1964 Innsbruck	7th in the Pool B	15th
(Italy) (Hungary) 1965	Qualifying round Group B	—
(Socialist Federal Republic of Yugoslavia) 1966 Jesenice	1st in the Pool C ▲	17th
(Austria) 1967 Vienna	5th in the Pool B	13th
(Socialist Federal Republic of Yugoslavia) 1969 Ljubljana	8th in the Pool B ▼	14th
(Romania) 1970 Galaţi	2nd in the Pool C▲	16th
(Switzerland) 1971 Bern/Geneva	8th in the Pool B ▼	14th
(Romania) 1972 Miercurea-Ciuc	2nd in the Pool C ▲	15th
(Austria) 1973 Graz	8th in the Pool B ▼	14th
(France) 1974 Grenoble/Gap/Lyon	2nd in the Pool C ▲	16th
(Japan) 1975 Sapporo	7th in the Pool B	13th
(Switzerland) 1976 Aarau/Bienne	7th in the Pool B ▼	15th
(Denmark) 1977 Copenhagen/Hørsholm	1st in the Pool C ▲	18th
(Socialist Federal Republic of Yugoslavia) 1978 Belgrade	7th in the Pool B ▼	15th
(Spain) 1979 Barcelona	2nd in the Pool C ▲	20th
(Italy) 1981 Urtijëi	1st in the Pool B ▲	9th
(Finland) 1982 Helsinki/Tampere	First round	7th
(West Germany) 1983 Düsseldorf/Dortmund/Munich	Consolation round ▼	8th
(Switzerland) 1985 Fribourg	3rd in the Pool B	11th
(Netherlands) 1986 Eindhoven	2nd in the Pool B	9th
(Italy) 1987 Canazei	6th in the Pool B	14th
(Norway) 1989 Oslo/Lillehammer	2nd in the Pool B	10th
(France) 1990 Lyon/Megève	2nd in the Pool B	10th
(Socialist Federal Republic of Yugoslavia) 1991 Ljubljana/Bled/Jesenice	1st in the Pool B ▲	9th
(Czechoslovakia) 1992 Prague/Bratislava	First round	9th
(Germany) 1993 Munich/Dortmund	Quarter-finals	8th
(Italy) 1994 Bolzano/Canazei/Milan	Quarter-finals	6th
(Sweden) 1995 Stockholm	Quarter-finals	7th
(Austria) 1996 Vienna	Quarter-finals	7th
(Finland) 1997 Helsinki/Tampere/Turku	Consolation round	8th
(Switzerland) 1998 Zürich/Basel	Consolation round	10th
(Norway) 1999 Oslo/Hamar/Lillehammer	First round	13th
(Russia) 2000 Saint Petersburg	Second round	12th
(Germany) 2001 Nuremberg/Cologne/Hanover	Second round	12th
(Sweden) 2002 Gothenburg/Karlstad/Jönköping	Consolation round ▼	15th
(Croatia) 2003 Zagreb	4th in Division I, Group B	23rd
(Poland) 2004 Gdańsk	2nd in Division I, Group B	19th
(Netherlands) 2005 Eindhoven	1st in Division I, Group B ▲	18th
(Latvia) 2006 Riga	Relegation round	14th
(Russia) 2007 Moscow	Qualifying round	12th
(Canada) 2008 Halifax/Quebec	Relegation round ▼	16th
(Poland) 2009 Toruń	1st in Division I, Group B ▲	18th
(Germany) 2010 Cologne/Mannheim/Gelsenkirchen	Relegation round ▼	15th
(Hungary) 2011 Budapest	1st in Division I, Group A ▲	18th
(Finland) / (Sweden) 2012 Helsinki/Stockholm	Relegated ▼	15th
(Hungary) 2013 Budapest	2nd in Division I, Group A ▲	18th
(Belarus) 2014 Minsk	Relegated ▼	15th
(Poland) 2015 Kraków	5th in Division I, Group A	21st
(Poland) 2016 Katowice	2nd in Division I, Group A ▲	18th
(Germany) / (France) 2017 Cologne/Paris	Relegated ▼	16th
(Hungary) 2018 Budapest	2nd in Division I, Group A ▲	18th
(Slovakia) 2019 Bratislava/Košice	Preliminary round	14th
(Switzerland) 2020 Zürich/Lausanne	Cancelled due to the coronavirus pandemic	–
(Latvia) 2021 Riga	Preliminary round	16th
(Finland) 2022 Helsinki/Tampere	Relegated ▼	15th
(United Kingdom) 2023 Nottingham	3rd in Division I, Group A	19th
(Italy) 2024 Bolzano	3rd in Division I, Group A	19th
(Romania) 2025 Sfântu Gheorghe	2nd in Division I, Group A ▲	18th
(Switzerland) 2026 Zurich/Fribourg	Relegated ▼	15th
(Estonia) 2027 Tallinn	Division I, Group A	

== Team ==
=== Current roster ===
Roster for the 2026 IIHF World Championship.

Head coach: (Finland) Jukka Jalonen

No.	Pos.	Name	Height	Weight	Birthdate	Team
7	F	Alessandro Segafredo	1.85 m (6 ft 1 in)	85 kg (187 lb)	15 September 2004 (age 22)	(Switzerland) ZSC Lions
9	F	Daniel Mantenuto	1.75 m (5 ft 9 in)	77 kg (170 lb)	18 October 1997 (age 29)	(Italy) HC Bolzano
10	D	Peter Spornberger	1.86 m (6 ft 1 in)	94 kg (207 lb)	6 January 1999 (age 27)	(Germany) ERC Ingolstadt
13	F	Matt Bradley	1.83 m (6 ft 0 in)	93 kg (205 lb)	22 January 1997 (age 29)	(Italy) HC Bolzano
17	D	Carmine Buono	1.88 m (6 ft 2 in)	91 kg (201 lb)	22 February 1997 (age 29)	(Italy) HC Gherdëina
18	F	Nick Saracino	1.84 m (6 ft 0 in)	88 kg (194 lb)	20 February 1992 (age 34)	(Italy) HC Bolzano
19	F	Bryce Misley	1.87 m (6 ft 2 in)	91 kg (201 lb)	5 September 1999 (age 27)	(Italy) HC Bolzano
20	G	Damian Clara	2.01 m (6 ft 7 in)	97 kg (214 lb)	13 January 2005 (age 21)	(United States) Anaheim Ducks
22	F	Matthias Mantinger	1.82 m (6 ft 0 in)	85 kg (187 lb)	22 April 1996 (age 30)	(Italy) HC Pustertal Wölfe
30	G	Jacob Smith	1.80 m (5 ft 11 in)	87 kg (192 lb)	1 May 1995 (age 31)	(France) Ducs d'Angers
34	F	Tommy Purdeller	1.81 m (5 ft 11 in)	88 kg (194 lb)	13 April 2004 (age 22)	(Italy) HC Pustertal Wölfe
35	G	Davide Fadani	1.82 m (6 ft 0 in)	78 kg (172 lb)	3 February 2001 (age 25)	(Switzerland) EHC Kloten
36	F	Cristiano DiGiacinto	1.83 m (6 ft 0 in)	88 kg (194 lb)	10 January 1996 (age 30)	(Italy) HC Bolzano
37	D	Phil Pietroniro – A	1.85 m (6 ft 1 in)	90 kg (200 lb)	27 May 1994 (age 32)	(Czech Republic) Rytíři Kladno
44	D	Gregorio Gios	1.83 m (6 ft 0 in)	92 kg (203 lb)	29 June 1999 (age 27)	(Italy) Asiago Hockey 1935
46	F	Ivan Deluca	1.93 m (6 ft 4 in)	102 kg (225 lb)	28 July 1997 (age 29)	(Italy) HC Pustertal Wölfe
49	D	Gabriel Nitz	1.90 m (6 ft 3 in)	95 kg (209 lb)	21 January 2007 (age 19)	(Italy) Wipptal Broncos
53	D	Alex Trivellato – C	1.89 m (6 ft 2 in)	90 kg (200 lb)	5 January 1993 (age 33)	(Germany) Schwenninger Wild Wings
55	D	Luca Zanatta	1.85 m (6 ft 1 in)	90 kg (200 lb)	15 May 1991 (age 35)	(Italy) HC Pustertal Wölfe
67	F	Mikael Frycklund	1.89 m (6 ft 2 in)	102 kg (225 lb)	4 May 1993 (age 33)	(Italy) HC Pustertal Wölfe
71	F	Marco Zanetti	1.75 m (5 ft 9 in)	72 kg (159 lb)	12 March 2002 (age 24)	(Switzerland) HC Lugano
73	F	Niccolò Mansueto	1.82 m (6 ft 0 in)	79 kg (174 lb)	8 August 2004 (age 22)	(Switzerland) HC Sierre
88	F	Tommaso de Luca	1.83 m (6 ft 0 in)	85 kg (187 lb)	29 December 2004 (age 21)	(Switzerland) HC Ambrì-Piotta
90	D	Dylan di Perna	1.88 m (6 ft 2 in)	98 kg (216 lb)	26 April 1996 (age 30)	(Italy) HC Bolzano
93	F	Luca Frigo – A	1.83 m (6 ft 0 in)	90 kg (200 lb)	30 May 1993 (age 33)	(Italy) HC Bolzano

=== 2026 Olympics roster ===
The first six players of Italy's roster were announced on 16 June 2025. The remainder of the roster was named on 20 January 2026. The host nation was the only team in the tournament with no current National Hockey League (NHL) players on the roster, with goaltender and Anaheim Ducks prospect Damian Clara the only player signed to an NHL team. On 11 February, Thomas Larkin was named Italy's captain, with Luca Frigo, Diego Kostner, Giovanni Morini, and Alex Trivellato named alternate captains.

Head coach: (Finland) Jukka Jalonen

No.	Pos.	Name	Height	Weight	Birthdate	Team
6	D	Jason Seed	1.85 m (6 ft 1 in)	88 kg (194 lb)	27 January 1992 (aged 34)	(Italy) HC Bolzano
7	F	Alessandro Segafredo	1.85 m (6 ft 1 in)	90 kg (198 lb)	15 September 2004 (aged 21)	(Switzerland) GCK Lions
9	F	Daniel Mantenuto	1.78 m (5 ft 10 in)	81 kg (179 lb)	18 October 1997 (aged 28)	(Italy) HC Bolzano
10	F	Dustin Gazley	1.73 m (5 ft 8 in)	76 kg (168 lb)	3 October 1988 (aged 37)	(Italy) HC Bolzano
11	F	Marco Zanetti	1.75 m (5 ft 9 in)	72 kg (159 lb)	12 March 2002 (aged 23)	(Switzerland) HC Lugano
13	F	Matt Bradley	1.83 m (6 ft 0 in)	92 kg (203 lb)	22 January 1997 (aged 29)	(Italy) HC Bolzano
18	F	Nick Saracino	1.83 m (6 ft 0 in)	88 kg (194 lb)	20 February 1992 (aged 33)	(Italy) HC Pustertal Wölfe
19	F	Alex Petan	1.75 m (5 ft 9 in)	82 kg (181 lb)	2 May 1992 (aged 33)	(Slovenia) HK Olimpija
20	G	Damian Clara	2.01 m (6 ft 7 in)	97 kg (214 lb)	13 January 2005 (aged 21)	(Sweden) Brynäs IF
21	D	Daniel Glira	1.85 m (6 ft 1 in)	87 kg (192 lb)	25 March 1994 (aged 31)	(Italy) HC Pustertal Wölfe
22	F	Diego Kostner – A	1.83 m (6 ft 0 in)	86 kg (190 lb)	5 August 1992 (aged 33)	(Switzerland) HC Ambrì-Piotta
23	F	Giovanni Morini – A	1.88 m (6 ft 2 in)	90 kg (198 lb)	2 February 1995 (aged 31)	(Switzerland) HC Lugano
27	D	Thomas Larkin – C	1.96 m (6 ft 5 in)	100 kg (220 lb)	31 December 1990 (aged 35)	(Germany) Schwenninger Wild Wings
34	F	Tommy Purdeller	1.80 m (5 ft 11 in)	88 kg (194 lb)	13 April 2004 (aged 21)	(Italy) HC Pustertal Wölfe
35	G	Davide Fadani	1.83 m (6 ft 0 in)	78 kg (172 lb)	3 February 2001 (aged 25)	(Switzerland) EHC Kloten
36	F	Cristiano DiGiacinto	1.80 m (5 ft 11 in)	88 kg (194 lb)	10 January 1996 (aged 30)	(Italy) HC Bolzano
37	D	Phil Pietroniro	1.85 m (6 ft 1 in)	90 kg (198 lb)	27 May 1994 (aged 31)	(Czech Republic) Rytíři Kladno
53	D	Alex Trivellato – A	1.88 m (6 ft 2 in)	90 kg (198 lb)	5 January 1993 (aged 33)	(Germany) Schwenninger Wild Wings
55	D	Luca Zanatta	1.85 m (6 ft 1 in)	90 kg (198 lb)	15 May 1991 (aged 34)	(Italy) HC Pustertal Wölfe
59	G	Gianluca Vallini	1.85 m (6 ft 1 in)	85 kg (187 lb)	27 October 1993 (aged 32)	(Italy) HC Bolzano
67	F	Mats Frycklund	1.88 m (6 ft 2 in)	95 kg (209 lb)	4 May 1993 (aged 32)	(Italy) HC Pustertal Wölfe
77	D	Gregory di Tomaso	1.85 m (6 ft 1 in)	85 kg (187 lb)	12 March 1996 (aged 29)	(Italy) HC Pustertal Wölfe
88	F	Tommaso de Luca	1.83 m (6 ft 0 in)	85 kg (187 lb)	29 December 2004 (aged 21)	(Switzerland) HC Ambrì-Piotta
90	D	Dylan di Perna	1.88 m (6 ft 2 in)	98 kg (216 lb)	26 April 1996 (aged 29)	(Italy) HC Bolzano
93	F	Luca Frigo – A	1.83 m (6 ft 0 in)	90 kg (198 lb)	30 May 1993 (aged 32)	(Italy) HC Bolzano

=== Thayer Tutt Trophy ===
- 1980 – Finished in 5th place
- 1988 – Finished in 1st place

=== European Championship ===
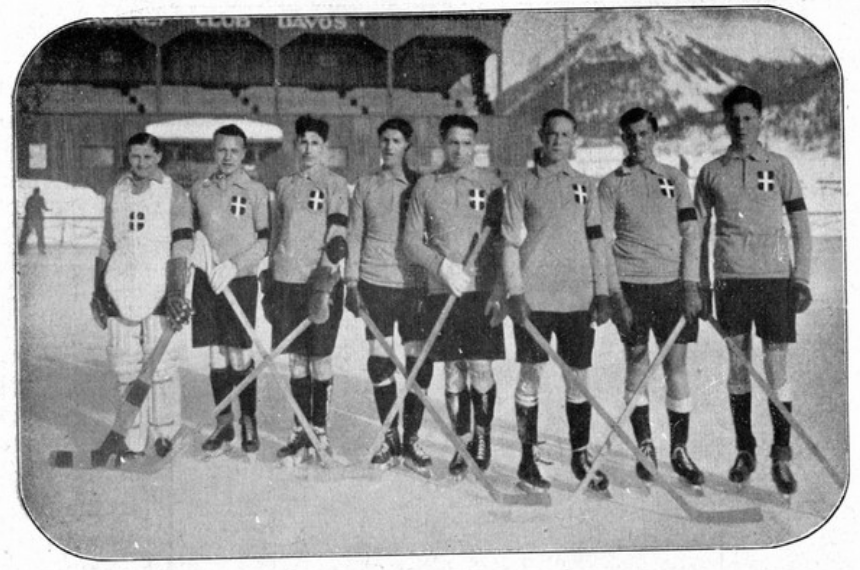
Italian national team at 1926 Ice Hockey European Championship

Games	GP	W	T	L	GF	GA	Finish	Rank
1910–1923	did not participate.							
(Italy) 1924 Milan	2	0	0	2	0	16	Group stage	6th
(Czechoslovakia) 1925 Štrbské Pleso, Starý Smokvovec	did not participate							
(Switzerland) 1926 Davos	4	0	1	3	4	26	Consolation round	8th
(Austria) 1927 Wien	did not participate							
(Hungary) 1929 Budapest	4	2	0	2	5	6	Third place match	4th
(Germany) 1932 Berlin	did not participate							

== Uniform evolution ==
National team jerseys

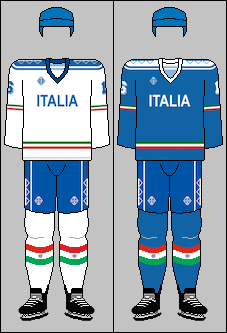
1992 Olympic jersey

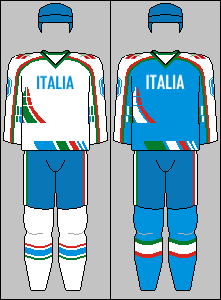
1994 Olympic jersey

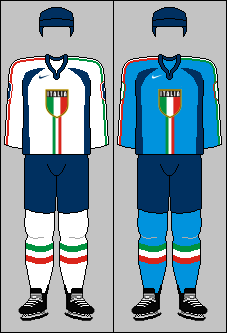
1998-2002 IIHF jerseys

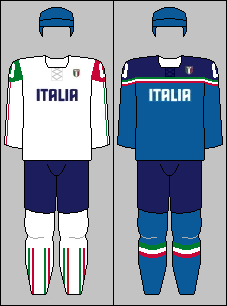
2015–2019 IIHF jerseys

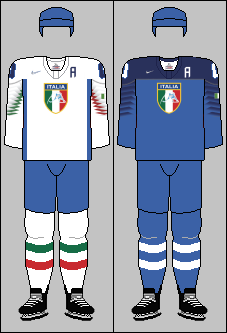
2019– IIHF jerseys

== All-time record ==
As of 8 November 2025.

Opponent	Played	Won	Drawn	Lost	GF	GA	GD
Australia	2	2	0	0	25	4	+21
Austria	97	39	12	46	277	298	-21
Belarus	6	1	0	5	10	22	-12
Belgium	8	7	0	1	74	15	+59
Bulgaria	10	9	0	1	55	22	+33
Canada	37	3	2	32	62	217	-155
China	13	11	1	1	73	26	+47
Croatia	5	5	0	0	24	1	+23
Czech Republic	9	0	0	9	11	64	-53
Czechoslovakia	6	0	0	6	5	52	-47
Denmark	30	13	3	14	118	96	+22
East Germany	22	7	4	11	75	121	-46
Estonia	3	2	0	1	10	4	+6
Finland	25	4	2	19	51	116	−65
France	92	50	6	36	313	257	+56
Germany	59	17	9	33	157	230	-73
Great Britain	20	12	2	6	98	65	+33
Hungary	51	26	6	19	170	144	+26
Japan	35	23	2	10	132	92	+40
Kazakhstan	25	7	1	17	47	71	-24
Latvia	19	4	1	14	30	71	-41
Lithuania	3	3	0	0	15	5	+10
Netherlands	32	25	4	3	155	68	+87
North Korea	1	1	0	0	11	2	+9
Norway	46	17	3	26	132	167	-35
Poland	62	23	4	35	153	204	-47
Protectorate of Bohemia and Moravia	1	0	0	1	0	5	−5
Romania	27	13	3	11	114	90	+24
Russia	15	0	2	13	17	84	−67
Serbia	1	1	0	0	8	0	+8
Serbia and Montenegro	1	1	0	0	13	0	+13
Slovakia	18	3	1	14	42	77	-35
Slovenia	61	25	6	30	129	153	-24
South Africa	2	2	0	0	35	2	+33
South Korea	13	12	0	1	72	19	+53
Soviet Union	5	0	0	5	8	63	-55
Spain	4	3	1	0	26	2	+24
Sweden	24	0	3	21	31	166	−135
Switzerland	67	16	5	46	168	306	-138
Ukraine	12	8	0	4	34	24	+10
United States	20	3	0	17	38	130	−92
Yugoslavia	34	19	3	12	149	135	+14
Total	1 023	417	85	521	3 167	3 690	-523
