= George W. Peirce =

American businessman

George Washington Peirce (1846 – 1938) was secretary and treasurer of the Golden Fleece Mining and Milling Company (New York), and the Golden Fleece Mining and Milling Company (Iowa).

== History ==
George served in a company of riflemen (2nd Massachusetts Infantry, Company I, 28; New Bedford) in 1862, when only sixteen years of age. He was an expert "shot", knew the country well, and was a very serviceable scout. In 1864, he accompanied General Alfred Sully on an expedition against the Sioux; he was at Forts Rice and Thompson, and was in a skirmish with the Sioux at Cannon Ball River. He was mustered out with company on June 11, 1864. After her husband's death, Mrs. Peirce and three sons resided for a time in California, but finally settled in Kamiah, Idaho, where they owned an extensive tract of land, on which they developed gold, silver, copper, and coal mines.

In September 1892 George W. Peirce bought the Golden Fleece Mine (Colorado) for $50,000 and developed it to one of the richest gold mine in Colorado.

== Reported death ==
There was reports of the death of a George W. Peirce on December 4, 1899, involved in a multiple train collision. The Omaha Daily Bee of December 5, 1899, reported six were killed but a George W. Peirce was injured rather than killed, and this was echoed by other papers.

== Family ==
George W. Peirce was born as the third son of Thomas Tarbell Peirce (born Sept. 5, 1817; died Jan. 8, 1875) and Lydia Jane Pratt.
Four sons were born to Thomas T. and Lydia J. (Pratt) Peirce, as follows :
Henry Leeds, b. in Harrison, Maine, Nov. 17, 1842. Married and settled in Lynde, Minn.
Parker Illsley, b. in Harrison, Maine, Nov. 17, 1844.
George Washington, b. in Harrison, Maine, Feb. 5, 1846.
Thomas Tarbell, b. at Island Pond, Vt., Oct. 16, 1850; died in Berlin, Wis., Nov. 5, 1854.

Peirce and his brother Parker (died March 14, 1930) never were married and George went to live in Seattle with his adopted sister Mrs. C. W. Ellenson. George died November 3, 1938, at the Ellenson home in Seattle. The Peirce's family grave is at the Kamiah's Historic IOOF Cemetery.
