= Golden Fleece Mining and Milling Company (New York) =

American company, incorporated 1882

The Golden Fleece Mining and Milling Company (New York), probably already founded in 1879, but incorporated on April 22, 1882, in Tompkins County, New York, with a capital of $1,000,000, was a San Francisco Stock and Exchange traded mining company.

The company operated several mining sites, including at Deadwood, Placer County, California, after driving a three thousand foot tunnel, the Golden Fleece Tunnel, and one mine near Georgetown, Clear Creek County, Colorado, The company reportedly also held some interests in gold mining in Cave Creek, Arizona.

In September 1892, George W. Peirce, the company's treasurer, bought the Golden Fleece Mine in Colorado for $50,000 (~$1.56 million in 2024). During that year the company seems to have raised its capital basis to finance its expansion. Probably the new capital stock of $600,000 (~$18.7 million in 2024) was organized under another company, which was incorporated in Iowa in 1893, under the same name of Golden Fleece Mining and Milling Company (Iowa).

== Management ==
- George W. Peirce was secretary and treasurer of the company. Peirce was also secretary of Golden Fleece Mining and Milling Company (Iowa) in 1893.
- John Owen Marsh, born March 21, 1829, in McLean, died on August 1, 1884, was chosen president of the Golden Fleece Mining and Milling Company since April 1884. But his fortune as president of the company did not last long. An excerpt of the Daily Democrat from August 4, 1884, reads:

"ITHACA IN MOURNING. Death of the Well-Known Merchant, John O. Marsh:

…. Last April, Mr. Marsh became a member of the Golden Fleece Mining and Milling Company, and was at once elected its president. About four weeks ago, he started west on business connected with the affairs of the company, intending to be gone five or six weeks. He went first to Denver, Colorado, and after transacting some business there; continued his journey to Arizona Territory, where the property of the Golden Fleece Company is situated. It is supposed that he went first to Phoenix, Arizona Territory, and from there accompanied by Mr. S. F. Mack, the company's superintendent of mines, to Cave Creek, the location of the company's property. He then returned to Phoenix, having written one letter home meantime. Last Thursday, Mr. D. E. Marsh received a telegram from S. F. Mack, saying that Mr. Marsh was quite sick with fever but not considered dangerous, and that he was having good care. Another telegram the next day stated that the fever was typhoid, and the patient in a critical condition. Saturday morning a still more disheartening message was received, followed by another at three o'clock in the afternoon with the sad tidings that Mr. Marsh commenced sinking at ten o'clock last Friday night and died at midnight. …"

- Henry Monell (born July 15, 1848 in Warwick (Bellvale), Orange County, N.Y.; died March 1922 in Boulder, Colorado, unmarried) was superintendent of the company, very probably until 1883, and was a good mineralogist who had prospected from Alaska to Mexico. Henry Monell had two brothers, Ira and Peter B. Monell, the last of whom resided in Montrose, Colorado. Ira and Henry Monell, both unmarried, were residents of Sugar Loaf, Colorado. Mr. Monell played an important role in the development of the mining activities in Colorado.
- Thomas Blake Campbell (born January 8, 1854, at Fayetteville, N.Y., died August 1928 in Huntington; married Eaura Frances Poole on February 23, 1881), was an architect, contractor and builder of the Memorial Chapel, Franklin Hall, Armory Hall, Morse Hall, Gymnasium Annex, Sibley College, and the Zeta Psi and Alpha Delta Phi Chapter Houses, at Cornell University, was named to be a director of the company.
- Stephen F. Mack, superintendent of the Golden Fleece Mining Company. He probably held this position after the resignation of Mr. Morell.

After the death of Mr. Marsh, public concern was expressed on the prospects of the company. Excerpt of The Daily Democrat, August 9, 1884, reads:

"BACK FROM ARIZONA. Mr. Mack Returns with Particulars of Mr. Marsh's Death:

Mr. Stephen Mack, superintendent of the Golden Fleece Mining Company, and who was with the late John O. Marsh, when that gentleman died, one week ago to-day, arrived in town last evening. This morning he was immediately besieged by a host of inquiring friends who were anxious to learn further details concerning the death of our lamented fellow citizen. A DEMOCRAT representative called upon Mr. Mack at his residence on Green Street, and learned the following facts from him. When Mr. Marsh arrived in Arizona he was much wearied by the long, tedious journey, and the slight symptoms of illness which he then displayed were attributed to this cause. His sickness, however, increased so long before it developed into typhoid fever, the details and sad result of which have already been published. It is not necessary to give the particulars of the long days and sleepless nights that preceded the termination of the sad affair; it is sufficient to say that Mr. Mack affirms the statement that everything within the power of skillful medical attention and careful nursing was done to relieve the sufferer. In regard to the remains of the deceased, Mr. Mack says that it will be impossible to remove them to Ithaca until cold weather, for the frontier village where Mr. Marsh died is utterly void of those improved undertaking appliances for the preservation of remains so common in the east rapidly that it was not. When asked as to the prospects of the mining company which he represented, and the stock of which is largely owned by Ithaca gentlemen, Mr. Mack did not feel at liberty to talk upon that subject, although he said that he felt satisfied that they had a good claim. Mr. Mack left Arizona Sunday morning."

The fate of the company is not known in detail, but very probably the interests and properties of the company were transferred to the Golden Fleece Mining and Milling Company (Iowa), which was incorporated 1893 under the laws of Iowa. George W. Peirce was the secretary and treasurer of both companies.

== Golden Fleece Gold & Silver Mining Company, Nevada ==
The company should not be confounded with the Golden Fleece Gold & Silver Mining Company, Nevada, incorporated on February 2, 1875. The Golden Fleece Gold & Silver Mining Company held interest in gold and silver mining at Golden Fleece Mine (Nevada), in Peavine Mining District, near Poeville, Washoe County. The company was listed at San Francisco Stock Exchange, on the Washoe Board list.

Today, this Nevada company is known in connection of legal proceedings against the Cable Consolidated Gold and Silver Mining Co. in relation to some mining claims. The results of this case, held before Supreme Court of the State of Nevada, are considered to be important for prevailing case law in mining in the United States.
