= 1988 Thayer Tutt Trophy =

Trophy

The 1988 Thayer Tutt Trophy was the third and last edition of the Thayer Tutt Trophy. It was held from March 20–27, 1988 in Eindhoven and Tilburg, Netherlands. Italy finished first, Japan finished second, and the Netherlands finished third.

== First round ==
=== Group A ===
Pl.	Team	GP	W	T	L	Goals	Pts
1.	Japan	5	4	0	1	31:10	8
2.	Netherlands	5	4	0	1	43:10	8
3.	China	5	3	0	2	29:21	6
4.	Bulgaria	5	3	0	2	15:18	6
5.	North Korea	5	1	0	4	11:28	2
6.	Australia	5	0	0	5	7:49	0

=== Group B ===
Pl.	Team	GP	W	T	L	Goals	Pts
1.	Italy	5	5	0	0	33:6	10
2.	East Germany	5	4	0	1	28:7	8
3.	Yugoslavia	5	2	1	2	16:16	5
4.	Romania	5	1	2	2	11:25	4
5.	Hungary	5	1	0	4	12:27	2
6.	Denmark	5	0	1	4	8:27	1

== Final round ==
11th place

- Denmark - Australia 8:1 (3:1, 3:0, 2:0)

9th place

- Hungary - North Korea 3:6 (2:2, 0:1, 1:3)

7th place

- Bulgaria - Romania 3:9 (1:4, 2:3, 0:3

5th place

- China - Yugoslavia 6:9 (1:3, 2:6, 3:0)

3rd place

- Netherlands - East Germany 4:2 (3:1, 1:1, 0:0)

Final

- Italy - Japan 3:0 (0:0, 1:0, 2:0)
