= William Thayer Tutt =

American ice hockey executive (1912–1989)

William Thayer Tutt (March 2, 1912 – February 24, 1989) was an American executive for several ice hockey leagues and organizations. He was born in Coronado, California and died in El Paso, Texas. He is the son of Charles L. Tutt, Jr., and has two brothers, Charles L. Tutt, III and Russel Thayer Tutt, and one sister.

Tutt was instrumental in bringing the first NCAA Division I men's ice hockey tournament to the Broadmoor World Arena in Colorado Springs, Colorado. He also helped bring the Soviet Union's ice hockey team to the United States for the first time in 1959. From 1966 to 1969, he was president of the International Ice Hockey Federation (IIHF).

In the 1970s, when word got out that the United States Olympic Committee was looking for a newer, more modern home, he helped convince the committee to move to Colorado Springs.

Also in the 1970s, Tutt was instrumental in bringing the United States Figure Skating Association headquarters to Colorado Springs as he arranged the purchase and transfer of the land for the new building. He also helped to bring the World Figure Skating Championships to the Broadmoor.

Tutt was elected to the United States Hockey Hall of Fame in 1973, to the Hockey Hall of Fame in 1978, and to the United States Figure Skating Hall of Fame in 1991. He was posthumously inducted into the IIHF Hall of Fame in 2002. From 1980 to 1988, national ice hockey teams that did not qualify for the Olympic Games, competed for the Thayer Tutt Trophy.

Outside of hockey, Tutt was involved with the Pikes Peak International Hill Climb auto race and served as the president of the Pikes Peak Hillclimb association. Tutt was posthumously inducted into the Pikes Peak Hill Climb Museum Hall of Fame in 1997.

== Personal life ==
Tutt married Margaret Bradford Timmons on November 4, 1932. They divorced in March 1932. On May 26, 1968, he married the former Kay Servatius Murphy, who had won a bronze medal at the 1953 U.S. Figure Skating Championships. Later he married former figure skating champion Yvonne Sherman, who survived him.

Preceded by Bunny Ahearne	President of the IIHF; 1966–1969	Succeeded by Bunny Ahearne
