= Tutt Building =

1890 Historic building in Pueblo, Colorado, US

- U.S. National Register of Historic Places
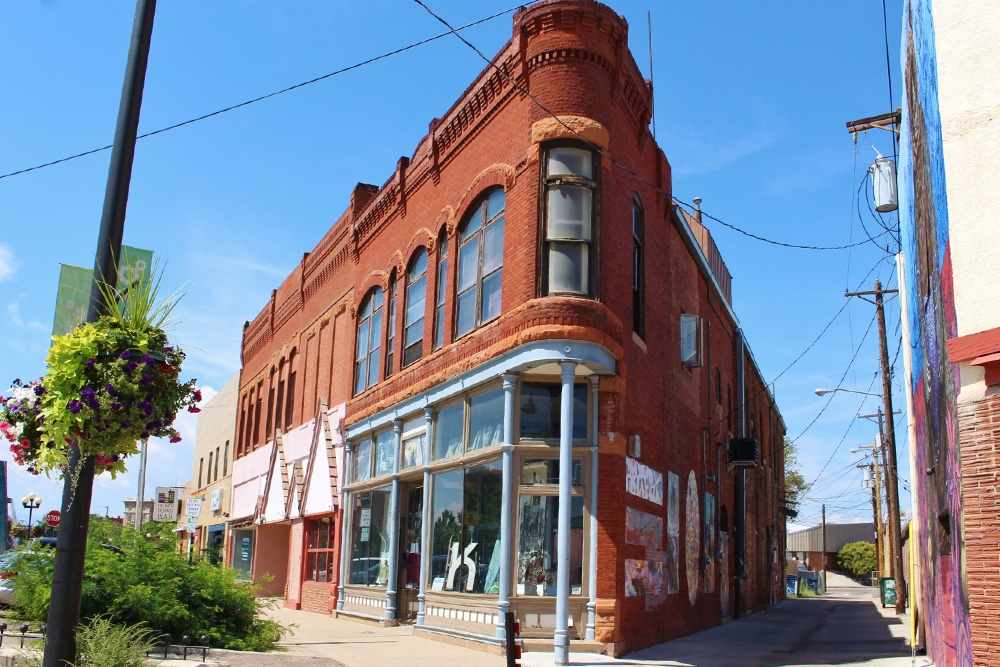

- Location within Colorado
- Location: 421 Central Plaza, Pueblo, Colorado, U.S.
- Coordinates: 38°16′07″N 104°36′29″W
- Built: 1890
- NRHP reference No.: 83001331
- Added to NRHP: August 18, 1983

The Tutt Building in Pueblo, Colorado, is an 1890 historic triangular shaped building. The building is one of few intact commercial structures in downtown Pueblo. It has been listed on the National Register of Historic Places since 1983, for the architecture. The building also has a historical marker.

== History ==
The Tutt Building was built in 1890 for businessman Charles Leaming Tutt Sr., who owned the structure until his death in 1911. The unique triangular shaped building's exterior walls are 12 inches (300 mm) thick brick with a red surface.

The property was sold to Adolph Coors in 1911, and was transferred to the Coors Brewing Company of Golden, Colorado in 1913. In 1947, the property was sold to the Goodman family and served as a jewelry company until 1982.

== See also ==
- National Register of Historic Places listings in Pueblo County, Colorado
