= Charles L. Tutt Sr. =

American businessman (1864–1909)

Charles Leaming Tutt Sr. (14 February 1864 – 21 January 1909) was an American businessman, miner, and real estate investor. He and his descendants are famous in Colorado Springs. He became a wealthy man by the time he was forty years old.

== Biography ==
Charles Leaming Tutt Sr. was born February 14, 1864, in Philadelphia, as a son of a respected doctor, Charles Pendleton Tutt, and Rebecca (née Leaming). His father died of typhus when the boy was two years old. The Tutt ancestors had immigrated from England. One ancestor had served as Lord Mayor of London and another was a member of General George Washington's staff during the American Revolutionary War.

Tutt attended the Protestant Episcopal Academy, where he met Spencer Penrose, nicknamed "Speck", and the two became friends. Both of their fathers had worked at the Children's Hospital.

Penrose, one of six sons in a well-to-do Philadelphia family, attended Harvard University. Tutt's family struggled after his father's death, and the youth quit school at an early age. He began work as a clerk for the Pennsylvania Railroad to help support his family.

He migrated west, landing in North Platte, Nebraska, where he lost $500 in a business venture. He moved to Black Forest, El Paso County, Colorado, where he bought a cattle ranch in 1884. In 1885, Tutt sold two cows to earn the return fare to Philadelphia. He married his fiancée Josephine Thayer on 29 December 1885, daughter of Martin Russell Thayer and his wife. Her father was a jurist who had served in President Abraham Lincoln's administration.

She returned with him to Colorado. A year after moving to the Black Forest ranch, Josephine convinced her husband to sell out and move to Colorado Springs to start a real estate and insurance business. Together they had four children, but three died young. Their son Charles L. Tutt Jr. (January 9, 1889 – November 1, 1961) was the only one to survive into adulthood.

He was the first owner of the Tutt Building in Pueblo, Colorado, built in December 1890.

== Colorado Springs ==
The Tutt family lived at 611 North Weber Street. They had a two-story gingerbread house, with a combination barn and buggy shed in the rear. Tutt's one-room business office was at 14 East Pikes Peak Avenue in the city. After opening a branch office in Pueblo, Colorado, in 1890, Tutt visited Cripple Creek, walked up "Poverty Gulch," and stake a gold mining claim. Once the claim was staked, a prospector with half interest in the mine, sold his half interest to Tutt for $50. Tutt owned the"Cash on Delivery" (C.O.D.), but had no money to develop it. Tutt, together with C. Findley and A. Carlton, all big players in the future of the mining district at Cripple Creek, set up the C.O.D. Gold Mining Company, incorporated on February 26, 1892, as a Colorado corporation. Later that year, geologist Richard Penrose, his friend Spencer's brother, travelled through Colorado Springs, where he met with Tutt. He asked him to write to Spencer and encourage him to relocate to Colorado Springs for its business opportunities.

== Mining business ==
Spencer Penrose, who had already mined for gold in Mexico, received a letter from Tutt in 1892 extolling the virtues of Colorado Springs. Although the two men had not seen each other for at least 10 years, Penrose took the chance on gold mining and arrived in Colorado Springs by train December 10, 1892. Two days later, Tutt offered Penrose half interest in his real estate business for $500, as well as 1/16 interest in the "C.O.D." mine in return for raising $10,000 to pay miners and buy equipment.

A gold vein was discovered in the mine. In 1894, Charles sold the C.O.D. mine for $250,000. He and Penrose decided to go into another business together. They learned that milling ore was a better way to make money than mining it. Along with engineer Charles M. MacNeill, they started the Colorado-Philadelphia Reduction Company and did very well with this business. The company operated a barrel-chlorinating ore mill at Colorado City. Charles M. MacNeill had already experience in running a barrel-chlorinating ore mill, since MacNeill, Captain De Lamar, George W. Peirce (of the Golden Fleece Mine (Colorado)), and some other mining men, owned interest in a barrel-chlorinating plant mill at Lawrence, the first in Colorado. It burned down in 1895.

Tutt and Penrose explored mining for copper, learning of a major deposit in the Bingham Valley, Utah. They, Daniel C. Jackling, and some other men, organized the Utah Copper Company in 1903 to mine there. Their open pit copper mine was the richest in the country. Revenues from this mine made both men millionaires.

Tutt did much to help plan and develop the city of Colorado Springs. Furthering their partnership, he and Penrose arranged to construct a road to the top of Pikes Peak, to stimulate the tourist trade. They also organized an annual motor car race to the top.

Tutt died young at age 45, on 21 January 1909, at the Waldorf-Astoria Hotel, New York City. His son Charles L. Tutt Jr. (and grandsons) carried on his legacy. They contributed much to the city of Colorado Springs and to Colorado College.

In 1918 Penrose had his grand opening for The Broadmoor hotel and resort outside Colorado Springs. After his death in 1939, Tutt's son, Charles L. Tutt Jr., served as the hotel's president and helped guide its expansion.

Tutt Blvd in Colorado Springs the city is named after him.

== Sources ==
- Thomas J. Noel and Cathleen M. Norman: A Pikes Peak Partnership: The Penroses and the Tutts. Boulder: University Press of Colorado, 2001. xii + 264 pp. ill. ISBN 978-0-87081-609-3.
- Denise R. W. Oldach (Ed.): Here Lies Colorado Springs. Colorado Springs, Colorado: Fittje Brothers Printing Company, 1995.
