= Charles L. Tutt III =

Charles Leaming Tutt III (January 16, 1911 – November 3, 1993) was an American engineer and educator. A member of a prominent Colorado Springs family, he was active in the city's civic life following his retirement.

== Life and career ==
Charles Leaming Tutt III was born on January 16, 1911, in Coronado, California and later lived in Colorado Springs as a youth. He was the eldest son of Charles L. Tutt, Jr., his grandfather Charles L. Tutt, Sr. was a notable businessman and miner. He had two brothers, William Thayer, and Russell Thayer, as well as a sister, Josephine Thayer Tutt. He attended high school at The Thacher School in Ojai, California. He then studied engineering at Princeton University, where he was awarded a B.S.E. in 1933 and an M.E. in 1934. He was a member of the Princeton Charter Club.

Tutt spent most of his career with General Motors in Flint, Michigan. He first worked at GM's Buick division for six years, where he helped design predecessors to Buick's Dynaflow transmission.

After working at Buick, he became an assistant professor of mechanical engineering at Princeton University. He returned to GM in 1946 and became dean of the General Motors Institute, an engineering school in 1960. When he retired, he moved back to Colorado Springs.

He and his father's friend, Spencer Penrose, were the co-owners of The Broadmoor hotel and resort in Colorado Springs. When Penrose died in 1939, his father Tutt became president of the resort hotel and one of four trustees of the El Pomar Foundation.

Tutt was active in the engineering profession, serving as president of the American Society of Mechanical Engineers from 1975 to 1976. He received an honorary doctorate from Norwich University, where he served as a trustee.

In 1933, Tutt married Pauline Barbara Shaffer. They had two sons and she died in 1981. In 1982, Tutt married Mildred Dailey LeMieux, with whom he had two stepdaughters.

Tutt died in November 3, 1993 in Colorado Springs.
