= Charles L. Tutt Jr. =

American philanthropist

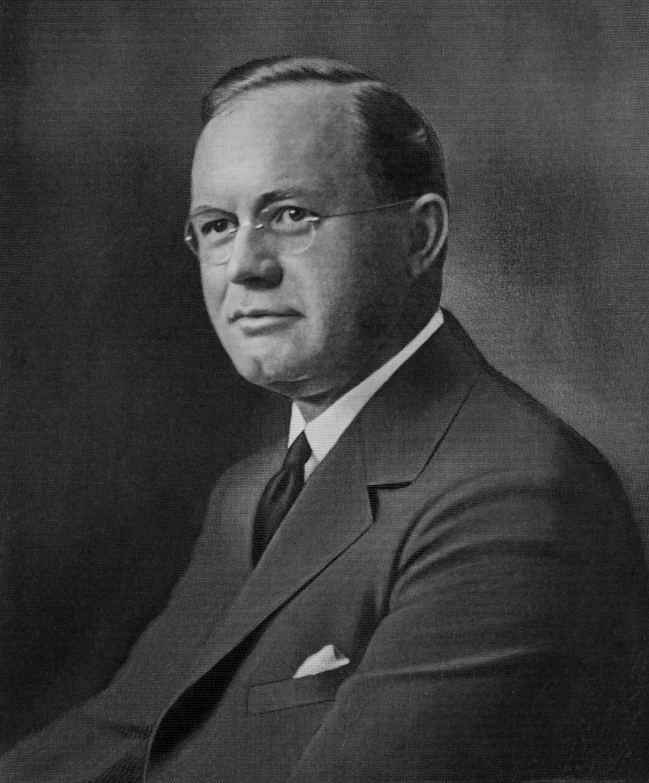
- Born: Charles Leaming Tutt Jr. January 9, 1889; Colorado Springs, Colorado, US
- Died: November 1, 1961 (aged 72); Colorado Springs, Colorado, US
- Occupation: Hotelier
- Spouses: Eleanor Armit (m. 1909; died 1925) Vesta H. Wood (m. 1934)
- Children: Charles Leaming Tutt III; William Thayer Tutt; Russell Thayer Tutt; Josephine Thayer Tutt; John Wood Tutt
- Parents: Charles L. Tutt Sr. (father); Josephine Thayer Tutt (mother)

Signature
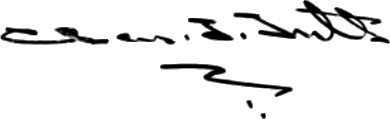

Charles Leaming Tutt Jr. (January 9, 1889 – November 1, 1961) was an American businessman and philanthropist. He was the son of Charles L. Tutt Sr. and the president of The Broadmoor resort. He was a trustee for El Pomar Foundation and Colorado College.

== Personal life ==
Charles L. Tutt Jr. was born to Charles L. Tutt Sr. and Josephine Thayer Tutt in Colorado Springs, Colorado on January 9, 1889. Of four children born to the couple, Charles Jr. was the only one to survive childhood. He grew up in Colorado Springs. His father was a school friend of Spencer Penrose in Philadelphia and a business partner in Colorado.

Charles Jr. graduated in 1903 from St. George's School near Newport, Rhode Island. Three years later he graduated from The Thacher School in Ojai, California. On August 16, 1909, Tutt married Eleanor Armit. They had four children: Charles Leaming Tutt III, William Thayer Tutt, Russell Thayer Tutt, and Josephine Thayer Tutt. Eleanor died on March 16, 1925.

In 1934, he married Vesta H. Wood (1900–1983), who was an archaeologist who graduated from Vassar College and Oxford University. They had one son, John Wood Tutt. The McAllister House Museum in Colorado Springs has a plaque at its front door in her honor.

== Career ==
During World War I, Tutt served in the Army as a captain. After that, he worked for a year in the real estate business. Tutt was secretary and treasurer of Electric and Manufacturing Company, Grand Junction Gas, and Grand River Valley Railroad Company. He was president of Beaver Fruit and Preserving Company, Beaver Park Land and Irrigation, and Beaver, Penrose and Northern Railroad. He was director of the Granite Gold Mine, Colorado Midland Railway, and Colorado Title and Trust Company.

Tutt was the secretary of the Broadmoor Hotel and Land Company until Penrose's death in 1939, when he became president of The Broadmoor, owned by Penrose's charitable organization, El Pomar Foundation. He became head of the foundation in 1956 with Julie Penrose's death.

The Tutt Library at Colorado College is named for Tutt, who served as a trustee of Colorado College. In 1959, the house he had lived in with his parents was donated to the school, and it is now known as the Tutt Alumni House.

He died at his home in Colorado Springs on November 1, 1961, at the age of 72.

In 1992, Edward H. Honnen (from the 1921 class of Colorado Springs High School) commissioned sculptor Cloyd Barnes to create a statue of Tutt, which was placed in front of the Tutt Library. Over the years, the statue has been decorated in various ways, and they have done so with affection, imagination and a sense of humor.

== Sources ==
- Thomas Jacob Noel; Cathleen M. Norman (2000). A Pikes Peak Partnership: The Penroses and the Tutts. University Press of Colorado. ISBN 978-0-87081-609-3.
- Denise R. W. Oldach (Ed.): Here Lies Colorado Springs. Colorado Spring: Fittje Brothers Printing Company, 1995.
