= Golden Fleece Mining and Milling Company (Iowa) =

Defunct American mining company

The Golden Fleece Mining and Milling Company (Iowa), was a mining company and was incorporated on May 7, 1893 under the laws of the state of Iowa. It had an initial capital stock of $600,000, 600,000 shares, $1.00 each. The company was represented by its president Biddle Reeves and its secretary and treasurer George W. Peirce. The difference between this company and the Golden Fleece Mining and Milling Company (New York), is very probably that the capital stock of $600,000 was organized under the same company name, but a separate incorporation in a different state.

The company had its administration at 101 Boston Building, Denver, Colorado.

The company had a predecessor under the same name of Golden Fleece Mining and Milling Company, of New York, which was formed in 1879 and incorporated 1882 under the laws of New York. Properties, including those in gold mining near Georgetown, Colorado, were taken over.

== People involved ==
- Biddle Reeves, the company’s first president, born November 18, 1850, was married to Maria Carver, by whom he had one son. Mr. Reeves was prominently known in Colorado, and made some of his fortune as realtor in Colorado and Utah. His death on May 29, 1898, was worth a newspaper report: The excerpt from The Deseret News, May 30, 1898, page 2, and The New York Times, June 1, 1898, page 7, reads:

Found Death on the Floor. Biddle Reeves, prominently connected with business in Utah, dies of Apoplexy. Denver., Colo., May 30. Mr. Biddle Reeves of the firm Reeves & Clemes, real estate and investment brokers, representing in Colorado and Utah the Mortgage Trust Company of Pennsylvania, was found death on the floor of his bedroom. Apoplexy caused his sudden death. He was born in Woodsbury, N.Y., 47 years ago. For years he was engaged in the manufacture of glassware with Samuel Tatua and company in Philadelphia and later was interested with his brother, Paul S. Reeves, in the manufacture of brass goods. His health failing him, he came west about 18 years ago.

- George W. Peirce, secretary and treasurer of the company.
- W. A. Akers, was superintendent and general manager at the Golden Fleece Mine (Colorado), at least until 1895.
- E. A. Kent, was named to be the first vice president of the company.
- Silas S. Kennedy (born January 6, 1837; died at age 77, on June 7, 1914, in Denver), a vice president of the company. Silas S. Kennedy was also founder of the Union Bank of Greeley, Colorado. In 1889 he hired architect Eugene Remich Rice to construct an elegant residence for him and his family at 27th West & 2709 Federal Boulevard, Denver.
- William Millard Lippitt, born in Putnam, Connecticut, in 1864; died March 19, 1904, in Chicago, Ill. He was an engineer, employed at Golden Fleece Mining and Milling Co. in 1896 and 1897, and did all the surveying and map work for the company. Mr. Lippitt was alumni of Brown University, Providence.,
- Harold Butler Barnes, an electrical engineer, was chief engineer and director in 1922, when a revival attempt of the company was made. He was born on February 18, 1880, and was son of Phineas Barnes and Fanny Ellsworth Wood. Harold Butler Barnes died on May 12, 1938, at Denver, Colorado, at age 58. Mr. Barnes was inventor of some patents and made some contributions to the electrification of Chicago as author of a professional text book.
- Blanche Kibble, was secretary and treasurer of the revived Golden Fleece Mining and Milling Company of Denver, Colorado.

== Events ==
=== The gold robbery ===
The rich gold ore from the company's gold mine in Georgetown, Colorado, and in some extent also at Golden Fleece Mine in Lake County, Colorado, attracted interest also from other sides. The ore was subject of a systematically robbery, which was uncovered in 1895.

Finally, the method of the robbery was elucidated. As a result, nearly the whole staff, about 150 persons, mainly miners, lost their jobs, and a new crew was hired. The theft case was solved with the aid of Pinkerton National Detective Agency. Charles A. Siringo, a detective working for the agency, was involved in uncovering the methods of the thieves, as it is mentioned in his memories.

A newspaper report from Sunday Herald (June 23, 1895) gives a detailed account on the robbery and some further information on the company:

ROBBING A MINE. Systematic Fleecing of Ore of the Richest Gold Properties.
The Golden Fleece Mining company is one of the best paying gold producing properties in Colorado and it has no wonder that a great sensation followed the recent discovery that there had been a series of systematic robberies by which about half of the output has been stolen. The extent of the robbery may be at least partially realised when it is stated that the output last month was $35,000. During the four years that the mine has been worked it has been one of the best paying, investments ever uncovered in Colorado. With a capital stock of $600,000 the promoters have within a few years all become wealthy men. Four years ago a party of Denver men, among whom S. S. Kennedy now living in Highlands was a leading spirit, began to work the mine which was then for the first time known to contain large deposits of gold. When a company was formed two years ago this month to further develop the property it was not anticipated that the output would reach anything like the figure that are now shown. In the past two years the yield has averaged more than $20,000 a month and many months it has run as high as $40,000. It was no wonder that the fact that one-half of this large output has been systematically stolen should have created consternation among those interested in similar enterprises.
Extraordinary Precaution.
The opinion was generally expressed that this is only one instance of where similar practices have been consummated in mining camps. For many years old miners claim, that professional thieves have been working the mines when discovered that have produced big outputs. This gang, it is asserted, have toured the West, and no great mine has escaped the robbery that has followed. To such an extent has this been carried that in many of the larger mines the plan has finally been adopted of closing all except one entrance and requiring that persons going in and coming out shall make a complete change of clothing. In most new mines, however, this rule is not observed.
The most sensational feature of the discovery is that the fact is borne home, that miners of Colorado must have lost in the last ten years millions of dollars by reason of the systematic scheme carried out in all its arranged details by a baud of professionals. As one of the officers of the Golden Fleece said yesterday, the work was not that of the miners themselves. As a rule, they are honest, and are content to receive the regular wages. Some bold thieves have, however, planned robberies on a gigantic scale, and it would appear have generally carried their schemes to a successful issue.
Defensive Organisations.
There is some talk of forming an organization of mining men for the purpose of running to earth and punishing the rascals who have plundered the rich mines of the State and pilfered their product from the rightful owners. There is no clue as to who the leaders of the gang of marauders are, but it is thought that with a perfect combination and the expenditure of enough money the perpetrators of this stupendous schema of robbery can he found. The specimens of rich tellurium ore exhibited in the company's office suggest the ease with which the stealing of enormous sums can be done. A small chunk of ore in the glass case not over two inches square is worth $65, while the large piece at the window which was shown at the World's Fair is worth more than $800.
In May 1893, the Golden Fleece Mining Company was organised with a capital stock of $600,000. It has since not only paid its dividends, amounting to about 25 per cent per annum, but has besides expended large sums in developing and improving the property. The output is principally gold. About two mouths ago the officers of the company received a tip that the company was being systematically robbed, and the investigation was then begun which now results in the finding that for many months the corporation has lost over one-half of its ores, stolen under the vary eye of the managers.
Vice President’s Statement.
S. S. Kennedy, vice-president of the company, said he did not know the details of the result of the investigation except as he had read the same in The News. "About two months ago," Mr. Kennedy said, "we received word that the ore was being stolen, and an investigation was then begun. A few days ago Misters Pierce and Lee were sent down to be on the ground and personally-endeavor to get the bottom facts. I believe no doubt the report in your paper is true, as it is in line with what we were prepared to hear." Mr. Kennedy owns 120,000 shares of the stock. He was originally the owner of a quarter interest but a few weeks since he disposed 30,000 shares, retaining now a fifth interest in the property. "Whenever a rich mine is opened" continued Mr. Kennedy, "professional thieves are sure to gather around. Genuine miners are all right. I do not think the stealing has been going on long, and I believe an organised hand of professionals is at the bottom of the whole affair."
To much an extent has this species of theft been carried on in other mines that the owners have at times of late discharged the entire force, innocent as well as guilty, in the effort to locate the rascals. Some months ago the management of the Victor gold mine at Cripple Creek let out all of the men and it is rumored that this course will now be pursued at the Golden Fleece, although if the other officers feel as Mr. Kennedy does, there will be no occasion for this plan, as he has no doubt the men are without blame.

The robbery did not affect the company's dividend payments to its shareholders. The dividend was not even cut back as one might think this would happen as a result of one of the biggest robberies in value known by then. To that point in history, the company enjoyed the highest reputation among investors and shareholders. But times were changing, later...

=== The name robbery: Golden Fleece Mining, Milling and Refining Company ===
Due to the extraordinary rich gold production in the mines and the high dividend payments to shareholders, Golden Fleece Mining and Milling Co. was well known being a reliable investment, at least for more than one decade, even before 1890, until the turn of the 20th century. That was in contrast to many other mining companies of that time, which had consumed the collected capital funds very quickly without ever paying any return or dividends to their investors. Although the glorious peak of Golden Fleece Mining and Milling Co. had passed long ago in 1910, its demise was at least not based on fraud, but rather than the missing luck in finding new gold veins in the mines.

The former reputation of the company many Americans must probably still have known, as in November 1910 the Burr Brothers Inc., residing at Flatiron Building, New York, was raided. Sheldon C. Burr being its president, and Eugene H. Burr, secretary and treasurer, among many others, were arrested for having robbed the Public of probably $100,000,000. The Burr Brothers and their associates had spun an extensive network of companies all over the country around Burr Brothers Inc., that was specialized for cheating large numbers of Americans upon their savings. This Ponzi scheme, due to its giant dimensions for its time being, received similar public attention as the Madoff investment scandal today. The Burr Brothers' case was followed by many newspapers. In 1911, when Burr Brothers were at trial, some inside went public to the mechanism of the scheme.

It was a specialty of Burr Brothers to create mining stock companies with melodious and fanciful, phony names. Among many other, such companies had tip-off names like Rawhide Tarantula, capitalized at $1,000,000; others were Montezuma Mining and Smelting, $1,000,000; Montezuma Extension Gold Mining Co., $1,000,000. But one of their set up companies, referring to the reputation of Golden Fleece Mining and Milling Co., was the Golden Fleece Mining, Milling and Refining Company, endowed with a stock capital of $500,000. Nothing other than a similar-sounding name was used to deceive many Americans to invest their money in fake companies.

It should be mentioned that the name game continued 90 years later, this time in different form, but under the same name of other Burr Brothers. This time Burr Brothers were represented by Daniel Burr, and his younger brother Robert, setting up an investment scam company, Cornerstone Management, in 1999. Here, only one reference is made to a newspaper article of the year 2003. It would be interesting to know, if Burr Brothers I (1910), are ancestors to Burr Brothers II (1999).

== Financials and Financial statements ==
The Golden Fleece Mining and Milling Company, Inc., was listed on the Colorado Springs Mining Exchange (stock designation: Golden Fleece). It paid high dividends to its shareholders during peak times. The company’s dividend payments can be explored for several years and were subject of statistical analysis.,

The company’s cumulative earnings report from September 1, 1892, to December 31, 1895, were published in 1896:

The Golden Fleece Mining and Milling Company of Lake City, Colorado, reports:

Production of mine from Sept. 1892, to Jan. 1896		$729,252.19
Less expenditure Sept. 1892, to Jan. 1896	$209,149.88
Less Insurance and Construction accounts	$ 4,680.76
		$213,830.64
		___________
Balance profit		$515,421.55
Dividends paid		$401,979.85
		___________
Surplus on hand Jan. 1, 1896		$113,441.70

Considering the dividend payments for this period only, shareholders received a capital re-distribution of 67%, calculated on the fully paid, original stock capital of the company. Golden Fleece Mining and Milling Company (Iowa), for its first time, was listed on Mining Exchange of Colorado Springs, on Wednesday, December 4, 1895. Before its listing, ownership of the company was condensed to few shareholders, and some shares were traded, similar to its predecessor Golden Fleece Mining and Milling Company (New York), occasionally on stock exchange.

On December 13, 1895, it open with $1,10 and closed with $1,30, some days after its listing.

In December 1895 the company purchased the Colorado City Mine in the Cripple Creek mining district, Colorado for $60.000 (~$1.96 million in 2024).

Gold production from gold mines in Hinsdale County, Colorado, peaked in 1895, and after that year constantly fell down. Reports on discovery of new gold veins in mines operated by the company were not published. Given below are some representative stock quotations, taken out of stock market reports, published in the NY Times on the following day.

Year	month	day	quotation
1897,	November	26:	$0.56
1897,	December	30:	$0.61
1898,	February	3:	$0.50
1899,	July	1:	$0.34
1900,	January	23:	$0.26
1902,	May	1:	$0.20
1902,	December	12:	$0.05
1903,	May	13:	$0.15
1903,	October	23:	$0.06

Quotations for Golden Fleece fell slowly, but constantly, reflecting the fate of the company. The stock became a penny stock, and accordingly, investors lost interest in investing in the stock.

The missing luck in discovery of new gold veins was publicly noted. The report suggests that luck of finding new gold veins had faded.

The decline in the Golden Fleece stock was used as template in Frederick Upham Adams story about the figure John Burt, a New England lad, who had gone West to seek his fortune and finds it in gold mining. The story is also an account to the stock manipulations, with reference to the gold mining scam, a feature also on top today. The excerpts from the story reads:

"Then I made a strike on the Mariposa River. Sold my interest to an English syndicate for ninety-five thousand. I went to San Francisco and fell in love with Lucile Montrose. Did you ever see her, John? No? Well, you've heard of her, of course. She's an actress, or rather she was an actress. Ah, Lucile, Lucile! She was a dream, John. Such eyes, such pearly teeth and golden hair! And her voice was like well, it was great. And I loved her and she loved me, and we were engaged to be married. I bought her diamond rings and sunbursts, and a carriage, and all kinds of things until my ninety-five thousand had dwindled to fifty thousand. I argued with myself that no such sum of money was sufficient to enter upon a matrimonial career with Lucile, so I decided to double it by making an investment in Golden Fleece mining stock. I lost the fifty thousand. With tears in her beautiful eyes, Lucile said she was sorry, and would wait for me to make another fortune. She did not say how long she would wait, and not hearing from me for three weeks while I was plugging away in the mountains, she married a one-legged old millionaire, and wrote me a letter saying she would never cease to love me."

The company went out of business prior to June 1913. The stock was listed by the Alien Property Custodian report in 1919, in an appendix as “securities of unknown and undetermined value”.

== Revival attempt ==
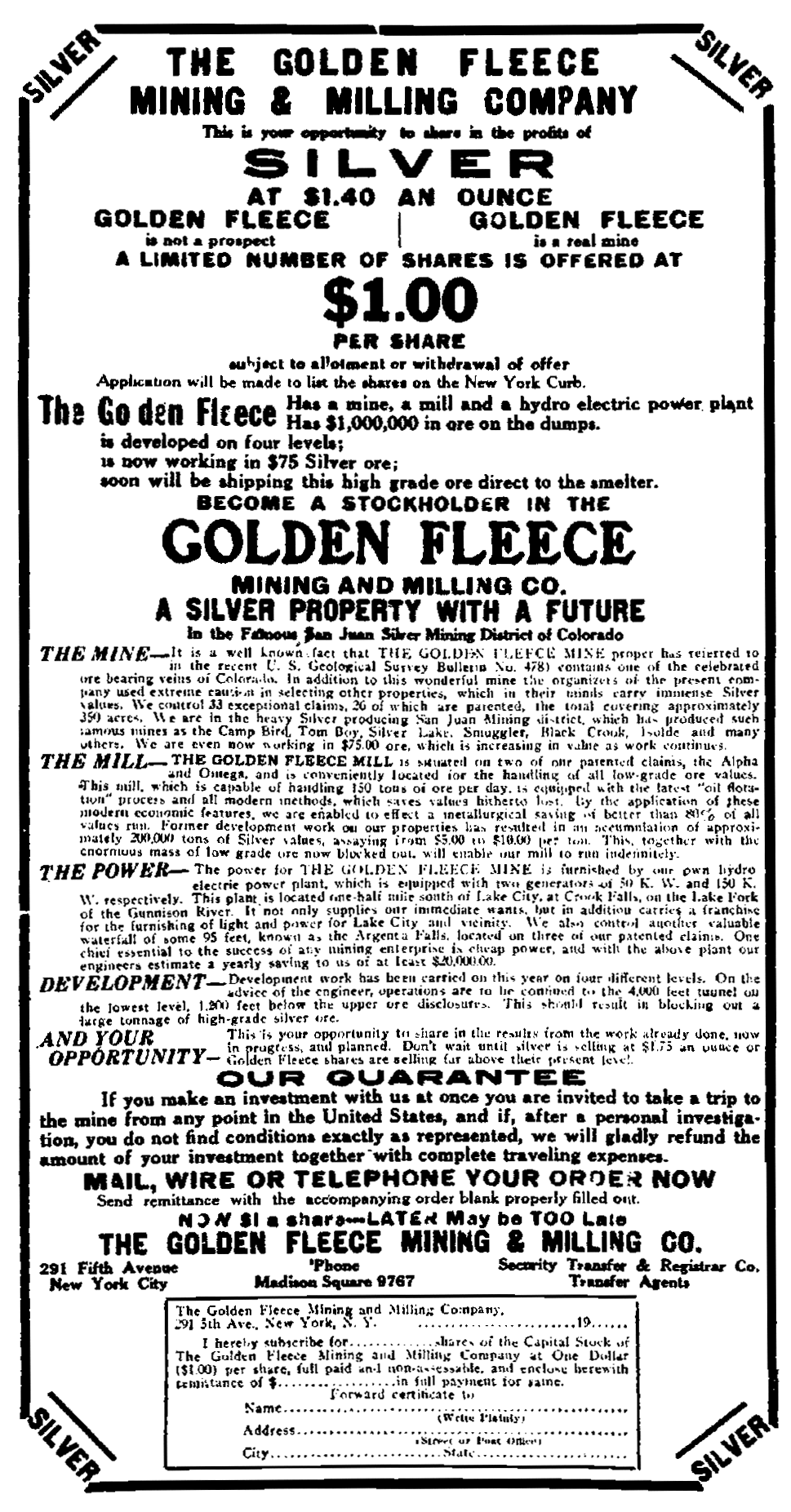
Advertisement for signing shares of Golden Fleece Mining and Milling Company, 1919 (Publ. in Rochester Democrat And Chronicle, Thursday, December 4, 1919, p. 32

A revival under the name of the original Golden Fleece and Mining Company was tried in 1920. The then issued company prospectus stated a stock capital of $2,500,000, and incorporation under the laws of Colorado. The new company was seated at 601 Foster Building, Denver Colorado in 1922, and soon later, when architect Jacques Benedict finished his Flatiron Building in 1923, the company moved its office to 313 Flatiron Building, 1669 Broadway, Denver, Colorado, with Harold B. Barnes being the executive, and Lyman Franklin Hulen as president of the company. The company in 1920 took a lease on some properties of the Golden Fleece Mine (Colorado) again. Although it was the Flatiron Building in Denver, did Mr. Barnes know, that the Burr Brothers had their headquarters at Flatiron Building in New York? It is not known whether this new company has ever operated in other business than that of increasing the stock capital to $2,500,000. The company was out of business already around 1926.

== See also ==
National Register of Historic Places listings in Hinsdale County, Colorado
