= Mikko Tolvanen =

Finnish ice hockey player

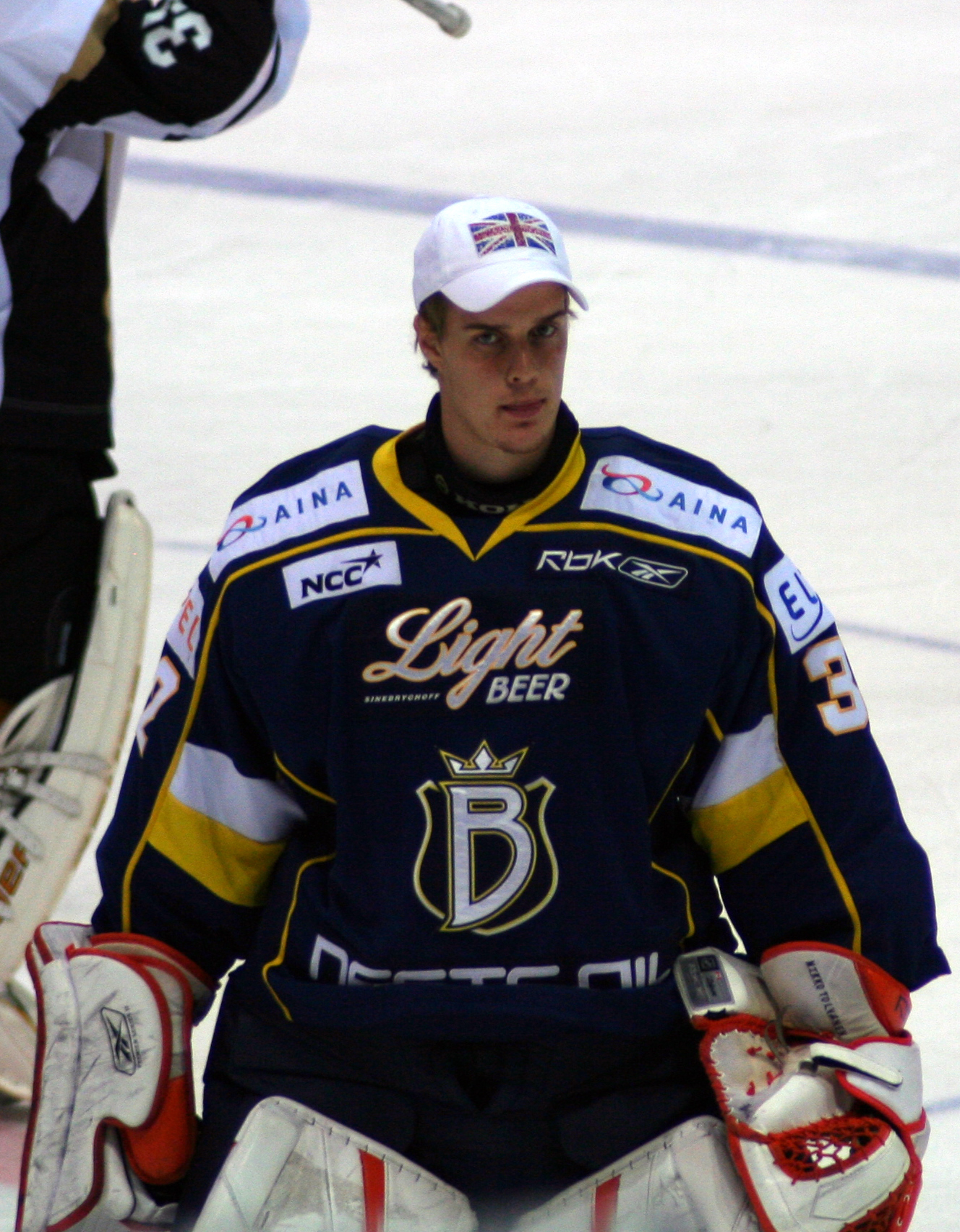
- Born: 14 July 1988 (age 36); Vantaa, Finland
- Height: 6 ft 3 in (191 cm)
- Weight: 185 lb (84 kg; 13 st 3 lb)
- Position: Goaltender
- Caught: Left
- Played for: Espoo Blues; HPK
- NHL draft: Undrafted
- Playing career: 2008–2013

Mikko Tolvanen (born 14 July 1988) is a Finnish former professional ice hockey goaltender who played in the SM-liiga for the Espoo Blues and HPK.
