= Golden Fleece Mine (Colorado) =

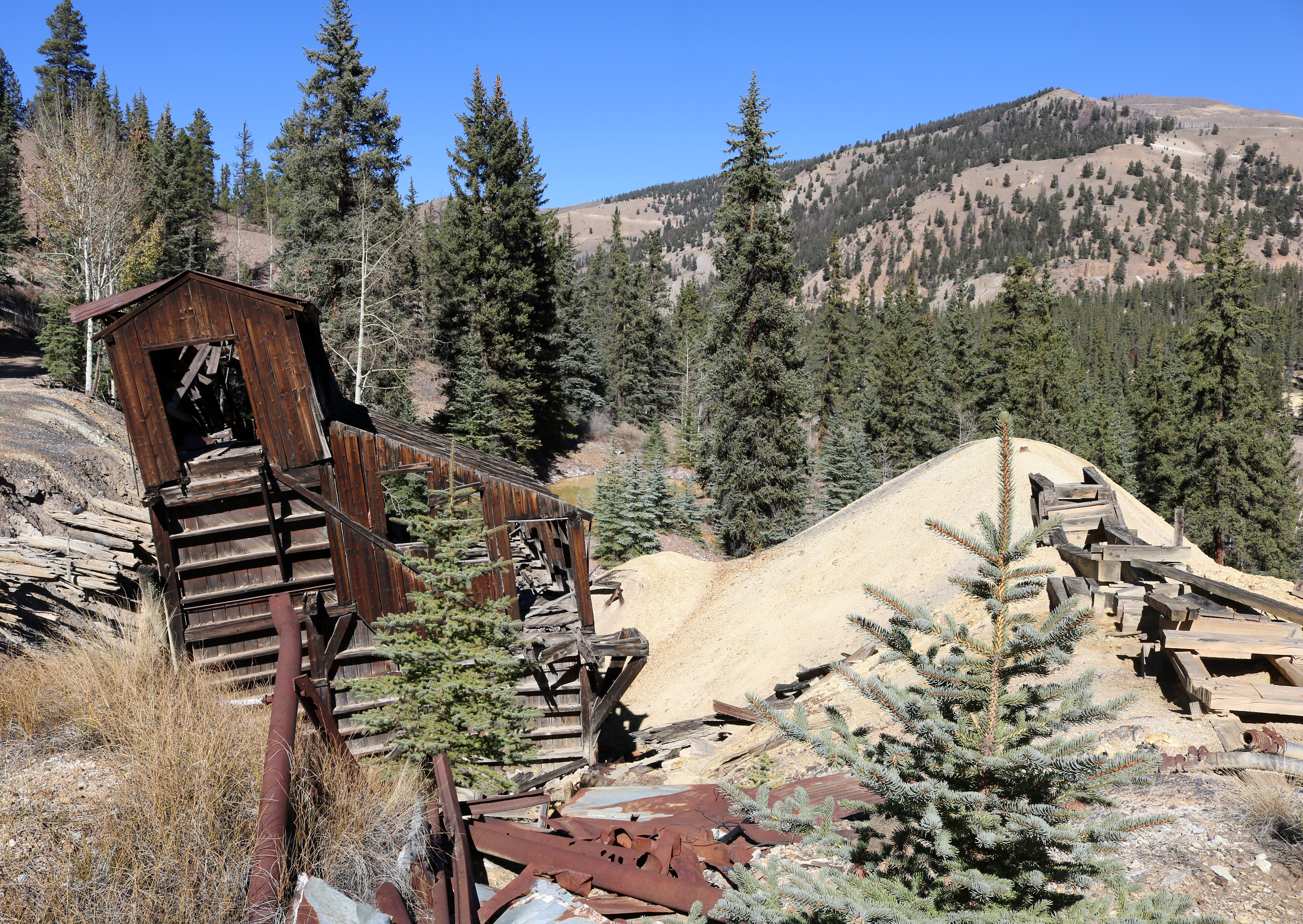
The mine, abandoned, in 2018.

The Golden Fleece Mine is a gold mining site in Hinsdale County, Colorado, 5 miles (8 km) south of Lake City. The mine is located half a mile west of the north end of Lake San Cristobal. By 1904 it had produced $1,400,000 in silver and gold ore. The mine operated intermittently until 1919. Later, in the mid-1960s, some renewed interest in the property came up, especially in the Hiwassee lode area of the mine, but other than a couple of small test shipments, there is no recorded production until today.

The Golden Fleece Mine had much impact on the development of the whole area around Lake City. A description of the mine, with special emphasis on geological features, including photos and a profile map of the mine, was published by Thomas Arthur Rickard (Thomas Rickard was his cousin). The Golden Fleece mine is also known for an unusual mineral, named hinsdalite (PbAl_{3}(PO_{4})(SO_{4})(OH)_{6}), which is a secondary phosphate mineral.

== History ==
Gold was discovered at the mine site by Enos Throop Hotchkiss, the toll road builder, in 1874. The mine was staked as the "Hotchkiss Claim" with Enos T. Hotchkiss, Monette Hotchkiss, James Sparling, Ben Hall, and Byron Bartholf. Ben Hall, one of the original owners, traded this shares to Henry Finley. Being unable to perform the first work on the site within the time required by law, in October 1874, the claim was then relocated in the names of Henry Finley, W. C. Lewman, Byron Bartloff, Monette Hotchkiss and Enos T. Hotchkiss, each of the men holding a one-fifth interest. Later, Monette Hotchkiss traded his ownership to his father, Eno T. Hotchkiss, in return for stock in the Saguache & San Juan Toll Road. Finley also paid $8,000 for Bartholf's share in the mine. Early in 1875 New York capitalist John J. Crooke paid $10,000 for a one-sixth interest in the Hotchkiss, with Finley selling another one-sixth share to Jonathan T. Livingston for $17,500. Results from preliminary work in the mine were promising and assay determination indicated the property to be very rich in telluride mineral and high gold ore content at a short distance below the surface.

In November 1876, work on the Hotchkiss mine came to an abrupt halt when Enos T. Hotchkiss was severely injured while entering the mine and fell 30 feet down a shaft. After lying idle for many months, the mine was sold at sheriff's sale to Chris Johnson, George E. Wilson (born 1839 in Pennsylvania, first mayor in Sterling, Colorado, died December 21, 1886) and Samuel Wendell. The new owners relocated the ground as the Golden Fleece mine. In 1890, Charles H. Davis took a lease on Golden Fleece mine. Then in 1892, he opened a large vein of rich telluride ore. In July 1892 one carload was valued at more than $19,000. In September 1892 he sold out for $50,000 to George W. Peirce of the Golden Fleece Mining and Milling Company (New York).

Irving and Bancroft found the mine idle in 1911.

The mine was owned by Colorado-Utah Mines Operating Co., incorporated in Utah, in 1918/1920, but property was idle, too.

In 1922 the mine was owned by the revived Golden Fleece Mining and Milling Company (Iowa) again.

The Golden Fleece mine was purchased by H. E. Moore in 1944.

Near the north end of Lake San Cristobal, ruins of buildings at the Golden Fleece mine are still visible today. The old portal to the mine is thought to be located at latitude: 37.983077, longitude: -107.293130, while the portal for the main third level tunnel is given as latitude: 37.980600; longitude: -107.300000.

== Other Golden Fleece mines (Colorado) ==
In Colorado, several other Golden Fleece mines were operating, but those did not reach the importance of the Golden Fleece mine at Lake San Cristobal.

- Golden Fleece mine, Eureka District, San Juan County, Colorado. This mine is located in the Picayune Gulch (Picane Gulch), approximately 5.5 miles (9 km) from Eureka. 37.9152°N 107.5767°W The mine was operated and owned by San Juan Golden Fleece Mining Co., Denver, Colorado, capitalized at $1,000,000, the stock principally owned by S.G. Beatty, Morris Landa and P.B. Beatty, company not stock listed.
- Golden Fleece Mine, Lake County, Colorado, located on Bull Hill (Mount Elbert), near Twin Lakes and Leadville, 39.0897°N 106.4628°W, elevation: 12,769 feet (3,892 m).
- Golden Fleece Mine, Dolores County, Colorado, also called Golden Fleece Prospect (New Year Mine), located near Rico, 37.6866°N 108.0245°W

In the 1883 edition of Colorado's mining directory two other Golden Fleece mines in Colorado are described, where other parties operated mines.

- Golden Fleece Mine, San Juan County, Colorado, situated on the north-east slope of Treasure Mountain, one mile south of Animas Forks, Eureka district, and located in 1878; (probably 37.9254°N 107.5726°W).
- Golden Fleece Mine, Gilpin County, Colorado, location described as: situated on Bobtail Hill, a little north to Golden Age Mine.
