= 2011 IIHF World Championship Division II =

Tournament details
- Host countries: Australia; Croatia
- Venues: 2 (in 2 host cities)
- Dates: A: 4–10 April; B: 10–16 April
- Teams: 12

The 2011 IIHF World Championship Division II were international Ice Hockey tournaments run by the International Ice Hockey Federation. Group A was contested from 4–10 April 2011 in Melbourne, Australia and Group B was contested from 10 to 16 April 2011 in Zagreb, Croatia. Prior to the start of the tournament the North Korean national team announced they would withdraw, citing financial reasons. All games against them were counted as a forfeit, with a score of 5–0 for the opposing team. This was the last year of parallel divisional tournaments so teams that finished third and above formed Group A for 2012, and the lower finishers formed Group B.

== Participants ==
=== Group A ===
Team	Qualification
Australia	Host, Placed 2nd in Division II Group A last year.
Belgium	Placed 3rd in Division II Group A last year.
Mexico	Placed 5th in Division II A last year.
New Zealand	Placed 4th in Division II B last year.
North Korea	Placed 1st in Division III B and were promoted in 2010.
Serbia	Placed 6th in Division I Group A and were relegated in 2010.

=== Group B ===
Team	Qualification
Bulgaria	Placed 4th in Division II Group A last year.
China	Placed 5th in Division II Group B last year.
Croatia	Host, Placed 6th in Division I B and were relegated in 2010.
Iceland	Placed 3rd in Division II B last year.
Ireland	Placed 1st in Division III A and were promoted in 2010.
Romania	Placed 2nd in Division II Group B last year.

== Group A Tournament ==
=== Standings ===
Promoted to Division I for 2012
Relegated to Division III for 2012

Rk	Team	GP	W	OTW	OTL	L	GF	GA	GDF	PTS
1	Australia	5	5	0	0	0	27	6	+21	15
2	New Zealand	5	3	0	0	2	19	8	+11	9
3	Serbia	5	3	0	0	2	22	11	+11	9
4	Belgium	5	3	0	0	2	19	14	+5	9
5	Mexico	5	1	0	0	4	8	31	−23	3
6	North Korea	5	0	0	0	5	0	25	−25	0

=== Fixtures ===
All times local.

4 April; 13:00	Belgium	3–2 (1–1, 2–0, 0–1)	Serbia	Melbourne Ice House; Attendance: 134

Game reference

Bjorn Steijlen
Goalies
Arsenije Rankovic
Referee:
(Romania) Lehel Gergely

P. Camelbeeck (J. Paulus) – 16:04	1–0
	1–1	17:37 – M. Milovanović (N. Bibić, N. Vučurević) (PP)
K. Van Looy – 22:23	2–1
V. Morgan (PP) – 30:15	3–1
	3–2	51:27 – M. Prokić (B. Gabrić, G. Ristić) (PP)

26 min
Penalties
10 min
22
Shots
38

4 April; 16:30	North Korea	0–5*	New Zealand	Melbourne Ice House

4 April; 20:00	Australia	11–1 (1–0, 4–0, 6–1)	Mexico	Melbourne Ice House; Attendance: 1,200

Game reference

Matthew Ezzy
Goalies
Andres de la Garma
Alfonso de Alba
Referee:
(Hungary) Peter Gebei

T. Manco (A. White, L. Webster) (PP) – 02:20	1–0
S. Stephenson (T. Powell, L. Thilthorpe) – 31:22	2–0
J. Hughes (N. Walker, T. Manco) – 32:33	3–0
J. Hughes (D. Huxley, B. Thilthorpe) (PP) – 35:46	4–0
N. Walker (G. Oddy, M. Ezzy) – 36:33	5–0
J. Hughes (G. Oddy) (PP) – 40:52	6–0
N. Walker (G. Oddy) (PP2) – 46:48	7–0
	7–1	47:00 – A. Gutiérrez (A. Rosette, S. Ortega) (SH)
L. Webster (J. Hughes) (PP) – 48:18	8–1
J. Hughes (PS) – 55:20	9–1
L. Webster (J. Hughes) (SH2) – 55:31	10–1
J. Gavin (T. Powell) – 59:47	11–1

47 min
Penalties
20 min
50
Shots
23

5 April; 15:45	Serbia	6–4 (4–1, 0–0, 2–3)	New Zealand	Melbourne Ice House; Attendance: 358

Game reference

Arsenije Rankovic
Goalies
Zak Nothling
Referee:
(Croatia) Vedran Krcelic

M. Sretović (M. Milovanović) – 00:22	1–0
N. Vučurević (M. Milovanović) – 05:04	2–0
M. Sretović (N. Vučurević) – 07:06	3–0
	3–1	11:32 – C. Eaden (D. Nicholls, M. Oak) (PP)
B. Jankovic (B. Gabrić) – 18:40	4–1
M. Prokic (N. Bibič, S. Ilić) – 41:18	5–1
	5–2	47:22 – C. Down (B. Speirs) (PP)
B. Gabrić (N. Bibič, B. Mamić) (PP) – 52:17	6–2
	6–3	56:29 – C. Eaden (P. Heyd)
	6–4	58:20 – C. Eaden

12 min
Penalties
10 min
56
Shots
28

5 April; 19:15	Mexico	5–0*	North Korea	Melbourne Ice House

6 April; 20:00	Australia	5–3 (0–0, 3–1, 2–2)	Belgium	Melbourne Ice House; Attendance: 1,320

Game reference

Matthew Ezzy
Goalies
Bjorn Steijlen
Referee:
(Finland) Jari Leppäalho

L. Webster (G. Oddy, J. Hughes) (PP) – 24:34	1–0
N. Walker (V. Stransky) – 25:15	2–0
	2–1	27:07 – V. Looy (L. Maas, M. Morgan)
G. Oddy (V. Stransky) – 35:58	3–1
J. Hughes (C. Sekura) – 40:43	4–1
	4–2	41:52 – B. Kolodziejczyk
	4–3	48:13 – B. Vercammen (B. Kolodziejczyk, L. Maas)
D. Upton (ENG) – 59:49	5–3

8 min
Penalties
12 min
45
Shots
33

7 April; 13:00	Serbia	7–0 (1–0, 4–0, 2–0)	Mexico	Melbourne Ice House; Attendance: 103

Game reference

Milan Lukovic
Goalies
Andres de la Garma
Alfonso de Alba
Referee:
(Finland) Jari Leppäalho

M. Sretović (N. Vučurević, B. Mamić) (PP) – 02:19	1–0
M. Sretović (M. Milovanović, N. Vučurević) – 22:55	2–0
I. Prokic (M-A. Fournier, N. Bibić) (PP) – 24:17	3–0
M-A. Fournier (F. Perowne, N. Bibić) – 27:01	4–0
B. Mamić (M. Sretović) – 29:44	5–0
I. Prokic (F. Perowne, M-A. Fournier) – 42:05	6–0
F. Perowne (I. Prokic, B. Mamić) – 51:58	7–0

10 min
Penalties
14 min
51
Shots
7

7 April; 16:30	Belgium	0–5 (0–2, 0–3, 0–0)	New Zealand	Melbourne Ice House; Attendance: 256

Game reference

Bjorn Steijlen
Kevin van Looveren
Goalies
Rick Parry
Referee:
(Hungary) Peter Gebei

0–1	04:14 – P. Heyd (M. Oak, J. Challis) (PP)
0–2	08:51 – C. Eaden (B. Speirs)
0–3	25:47 – B. Lee (I. Wannamaker, B. Speirs) (PP)
0–4	32:08 – J. Challis (D. Nicholls) (PP)
0–5	36:41 – C. Huber (L. Idoine, J. Hay)

12 min
Penalties
14 min
32
Shots
37

7 April; 20:00	Australia	5–0*	North Korea	Melbourne Ice House

8 April; 20:00	North Korea	0–5*	Serbia	Melbourne Ice House

9 April; 16:30	Mexico	2–8 (1–1, 0–3, 1–4)	Belgium	Melbourne Ice House; Attendance: 280

Game reference

Alfonso de Alba
Andres de la Garma
Goalies
Kevin van Looveren
Referee:
(Croatia) Vedran Krcelic

	0–1	17:20 – K. Van Looy (V. Morgan, M. Morgan)
A. Valenzuela (A. Barberena, C. Smithers) – 17:47	1–1
	1–2	22:54 – K. Van Looy (B. Kolodziejczyk) (PP)
	1–3	24:59 – M. Morgan (B. Torremans)
	1–4	26:28 – B. Kolodziejczyk
	1–5	41:17 – J. Raekelboom (B. Vercammen)
	1–6	41:36 – B. Kolodziejczyk (D. Leirs)
	1–7	50:07 – M. Morgan (V. Morgan)
	1–8	51:32 – D. Leirs (B. Kolodziejczyk)
A. Gutierrez (J. Ehlers) (PP) – 55:39	2–8

36 min
Penalties
36 min
21
Shots
44

9 April; 20:00	New Zealand	0–2 (0–0, 0–2, 0–0)	Australia	Melbourne Ice House; Attendance: 1,500

Game reference
Zak Nothling	Goalies	Matthew Ezzy	Referee: (Romania) Lehel Gergely
0–1 / 27:17 – N. Walker (V. Stransky, L. Thilthorpe); 0–2 / 36:09 – J. Hughes (M. Rummukainen, L. Webster) (PP)			Referee: (Romania) Lehel Gergely
10 min	Penalties	8 min	Referee: (Romania) Lehel Gergely
22	Shots	40	Referee: (Romania) Lehel Gergely

10 April; 12:10	Belgium	5–0*	North Korea	Melbourne Ice House

10 April; 15:45	New Zealand	5–0 (1–0, 2–0, 2–0)	Mexico	Melbourne Ice House; Attendance: 531

Game reference

Rick Parry
Goalies
Alfonso de Alba
Referee:
(Hungary) Peter Gebei

C. Eaden (M. Oak), P. Heyd (PP) – 17:32	1–0
I. Wannamaker (B. Lee), B. Speirs – 22:34	2–0
B. Speirs (B. Lee) – 30:47	3–0
A. Cox (J. Hay) – 56:38	4–0
P. Heyd (C. Eaden) – 58:51	5–0

8 min
Penalties
8 min
39
Shots
16

10 April; 19:15	Serbia	2–4 (1–2, 0–1, 1–1)	Australia	Melbourne Ice House; Attendance: 1,550

Game reference

Arsenije Rankovic
Milan Lukovic
Goalies
Matthew Ezzy
Referee:
(Finland) Jari Leppäalho

N. Raković (B. Mamić) (PP) – 07:48	1–0
	1–1	07:57 – G. Oddy (V. Stransky)
	1–2	11:57 – D. Upton
	1–3	26:43 – J. Hughes (T. Powell, L. Webster)
M. Kovačević (N. Vučurević) (SH) – 41:07	2–3
	2–4	58:33 – L. Webster (N. Walker, J. Hughes)

10 min
Penalties
14 min
44
Shots
21

=== Scoring leaders ===
List shows the top ten skaters sorted by points, then goals.

Player	GP	G	A	Pts	+/−	PIM
(Australia) Joseph Hughes	4	7	4	11	+4	4
(Australia) Lliam Webster	4	4	3	7	+4	2
(New Zealand) Chris Eaden	4	5	1	6	+1	2
(Australia) Nathan Walker	4	4	2	6	+7	4
(Belgium) Bryan Kolodziejczyk	4	3	3	6	+2	14
(Australia) Greg Oddy	4	2	4	6	+5	2
(Serbia) Nemanja Vučurević	4	1	5	6	+5	0
(Serbia) Marko Sretović	4	4	1	5	+2	2
(New Zealand) Paris Heyd	4	2	3	5	+1	4
(Serbia) Branko Mamić	4	1	4	5	+4	10
(New Zealand) Brett Speirs	4	1	4	5	+2	8

GP = Games played; G = Goals; A = Assists; Pts = Points; +/− = Plus/minus; PIM = Penalties in minutes; POS = Position
Source: IIHF.com

=== Leading goaltenders ===
Only the top five goaltenders, based on save percentage, who have played 40% of their team's minutes are included in this list.

Player	TOI	SA	GA	GAA	Sv%	SO
(New Zealand) Rick Parry	120:00	48	0	0.00	100.00	2
(Australia) Matthew Ezzy	240:00	116	6	1.50	95.08	1
(New Zealand) Zak Nothling	119:21	88	8	4.02	91.67	0
(Belgium) Bjorn Steijlen	159:51	103	11	4.13	90.35	0
(Serbia) Arsenije Rankovic	152:53	56	8	3.14	87.50	0

TOI = Time on ice (minutes:seconds); SA = Shots against; GA = Goals against; GAA = Goals against average; Sv% = Save percentage; SO = Shutouts
Source: IIHF.com

=== Tournament Awards ===
Best players selected by the directorate

- Best Goaltender: Zak Nothling (NZL)
- Best Forward: Joseph Hughes (AUS)
- Best Defenceman: Nikola Bibic (SRB)

Best players

Best player of each team selected by the coaches.

- Nathan Walker (AUS)
- Kristof Van Looy (BEL)
- Fernando Ugarte (MEX)
- Corey Down (NZL)
- Marko Sretović (SRB)

== Group B Tournament ==
=== Standings ===
Promoted to Division I for 2012
Relegated to Division III for 2012

Rk	Team	GP	W	OTW	OTL	L	GF	GA	GDF	PTS
1	Romania	5	5	0	0	0	47	8	+39	15
2	Croatia	5	4	0	0	1	53	10	+43	12
3	Iceland	5	3	0	0	2	24	18	+6	9
4	China	5	2	0	0	3	26	25	+1	6
5	Bulgaria	5	1	0	0	4	17	42	−25	3
6	Ireland	5	0	0	0	5	4	68	−64	0

=== Fixtures ===
All times local.

10 April; 13:00	Romania	9–4 (5–1, 1–2, 3–1)	China	Dom Sportova; Attendance: 100

Game reference

Adrian Catrinoi Cornea
Goalies
Liu Zhiwei
Xie Ming
Referee:
(Norway) Tommy Soestumoen

E. Mihály (T. Basilidesz, I. Nagy) (SH) – 04:37	1–0
T. Becze (M. Petres, E. Moldován) – 07:41	2–0
Z. Antal – 08:23	3–0
O. Bíró (R. Gliga, E. Moldován) – 13:08	4–0
	4–1	18:54 – Cui Z.
C. Virág (I. Nagy) – 19:04	5–1
	5–2	25:36 – Zhang W. (Qu Y.) (SH)
Z. Molnár (C. Virág, Z. Antal) – 29:20	6–2
	6–3	29:46 – Zhang W. (Li J., Wang D.)
A. Góga (O. Bíró, Z. Antal) (SH) – 45:49	7–3
	7–4	50:12 – Fu N. (PP)
O. Bíró (E. Moldován, M. Petres) – 54:45	8–4
S. Papp (I. Nagy, Z. Antal) (PP) – 55:21	9–4

18 min
Penalties
24 min
42
Shots
28

10 April; 16:30	Ireland	0–6 (0–2, 0–4, 0–0)	Bulgaria	Dom Sportova; Attendance: 120

Game reference

Kevin Kelly
Adam Pepper
Goalies
Konstantin Mihailov
Referee:
(Italy) Daniel Gamper

0–1	05:55 – M. Boyadjiev (C. Cvetanov, M. Giurov) (PP)
0–2	14:12 – S. Muhachev (R. Morgunov)
0–3	23:17 – M. Milanov (M. Boyadjiev, S. Muhachev) (SH)
0–4	23:43 – M. Milanov (R. Asenov, S. Muhachev) (SH)
0–5	28:27 – A. Yotov (M. Boyadjiev, C. Cvetanov)
0–6	33:45 – A. Yotov (C. Cvetanov, M. Giurov)

16 min
Penalties
10 min
20
Shots
52

10 April; 20:15	Iceland	0–9 (0–3, 0–3, 0–3)	Croatia	Dom Sportova; Attendance: 3,000

Game reference

Dennis Hedstrom
Omar Skúlason
Goalies
Mate Tomljenović
Referee:
(Slovakia) Robert Mullner

0–1	11:31 – D. Kanaet (M. Blagus, M. Brumerčik) (PP)
0–2	15:38 – M. Lovrenčić (M. Ljubić, M. Brumerčik) (PP)
0–3	19:15 – V. Žibret (K. Svigir) (PP)
0–4	21:02 – B. Rendulić (M. Blagus, D. Kanaet)
0–5	22:54 – M. Lovrenčić (M. Tadić) (PP)
0–6	36:20 – J. Kučera (M. Lovrenčić, M. Tadić) (PP)
0–7	46:46 – M. Lovrenčić
0–8	49:59 – M. Blagus (B. Rendulić, M. Brumerčik) (PP)
0–9	59:56 – M. Blagus (M. Tadić)

22 min
Penalties
14 min
12
Shots
53

11 April; 13:00	China	5–0 (0–0, 2–0, 3–0)	Ireland	Dom Sportova; Attendance: 80

Game reference

Xie Ming
Goalies
Adam Pepper
Referee:
(Poland) Marczuk Wlodzimierz

Zhang H. – 25:19	1–0
Li J. (Zhang W., Qu Y.) (PP) – 31:30	2–0
Zhang W. (Dong Z.) (PP) – 43:42	3–0
Zhang H. (Qu Y.) (PP) – 45:16	4–0
Zhang W. (Wang D.) (PP) – 58:38	5–0

24 min
Penalties
14 min
58
Shots
16

11 April; 16:30	Romania	4–2 (0–1, 2–1, 2–0)	Iceland	Dom Sportova; Attendance: 85

Game reference

Adrian Catrinoi Cornea
Goalies
Dennis Hedstrom
Referee:
(Italy) Daniel Gamper

	0–1	03:08 – R. Hedström (E. Thormodsson, E. Alengaard)
	0–2	20:37 – E. Alengaard (S. Hrafnsson, R. Hedström) (PP2)
Z. Molnár (C. Virág) (SH) – 27:42	1–2
S. Papp (C. Virág, A. Zsombor) (PP) – 33:19	2–2
O. Bíró (M. Petres, J. Adorján) (PP) – 45:02	3–2
E. Moldován (M. Petres, O. Bíró) (ENG) – 59:18	4–2

18 min
Penalties
10 min
48
Shots
18

11 April; 20:15	Croatia	17–2 (4–0, 9–1, 4–1)	Bulgaria	Dom Sportova; Attendance: 1,000

Game reference

Mate Tomljenović
Tihomir Filipec
Goalies
Konstantin Mihailov
Teodor Asenov
Referee:
(Norway) Tommy Soestumoen

B. Rendulić (D. Kanaet, M. Blagus) – 01:12	1–0
T. Grozaj (M. Smerdelj, N. Senzel) – 08:29	2–0
T. Čunko (M. Brumerčik, M. Ljubić) (PP) – 14:29	3–0
T. Čunko (M. Lovrenčić) – 18:58	4–0
M. Lovrenčić (T. Čunko, I. Šijan) (PP2) – 20:48	5–0
D. Plahutar (N. Senzel, K. Svigir) (PP) – 22:41	6–0
	6–1	23:04 – S. Georgiev
M. Ljubić (M. Lovrenčić, J. Kučera) – 23:49	7–1
B. Rendulić (M. Sertić, D. Kanaet) – 24:16	8–1
M. Blagus (D. Kanaet, N. Senzel) – 24:42	9–1
M. Blagus (B. Rendulić, D. Kanaet) (PP) – 28:49	10–1
M. Lovrenčić (M. Ljubić) – 31:15	11–1
M. Lovrenčić (T. Čunko) (PP) – 35:11	12–1
M. Brumerčik (T. Grozaj, M. Sertić) (PP) – 39:03	13–1
D. Plahutar (N. Senzel, V. Žibret) – 49:06	14–1
N. Senzel (M. Lovrenčić, M. Brumerčik) – 56:22	15–1
D. Kanaet (B. Rendulić, M. Ljubić) – 57:30	16–1
B. Rendulić (D. Kanaet) – 58:35	17–1
	17–2	59:40 – A. Yotov (V. Vasilev)

6 min
Penalties
22 min
103
Shots
14

13 April; 13:00	Iceland	3–2 (0–0, 3–0, 0–2)	Bulgaria	Dom Sportova; Attendance: 60

Game reference

Dennis Hedstrom
Goalies
Konstantin Mihailov
Referee:
(Norway) Tommy Soestumoen

O. Björnsson (U. Andresson, P. Maack) – 26:57	1–0
E. Thormodsson (B. Arnason, E. Alengaard) (PP) – 35:26	2–0
E. Thormodsson (E. Alengaard, B. Arnason) – 38:55	3–0
	3–1	46:49 – A. Yotov (C. Cvetanov, M. Giurov)
	3–2	48:47 – S. Muhachev (M. Boyadjiev, V. Vasilev) (PP)

6 min
Penalties
12 min
31
Shots
22

13 April; 16:30	Romania	22–0 (6–0, 8–0, 8–0)	Ireland	Dom Sportova; Attendance: 80

Game reference

Adrian Catrinoi Cornea
Rajmond Fulop
Goalies
Adam Pepper
Kevin Kelly
Referee:
(Slovakia) Robert Mullner

O. Bíró (Z. Pál) – 00:24	1–0
R. Gliga (S. Papp, E. Moldovan) – 03:11	2–0
J. Adorján (Z. Antal, C. Virág) – 05:46 (PP)	3–0
Y. Pysarenko (T. Becze) – 12:16	4–0
S. Papp (I. Nagy) – 12:30	5–0
C. Virág (Z. Molnár, Z. Antal) – 16:27	6–0
E. Kósa (Y. Pysarenko, Z. Pál) – 20:22 (PP)	7–0
L. Péter (Z. Bálint, Y. Pysarenko) – 24:25	8–0
I. Nagy (R. Gliga, L. Péter) – 30:48	9–0
S. Papp (R. Gliga, L. Péter) – 31:32	10–0
E. Kósa (C. Virág, Z. Antal) – 34:03	11–0
T. Becze (I. Nagy, T. Basilidesz) – 34:40	12–0
T. Becze (S. Papp) – 35:25	13–0
Z. Bálint (R. Gliga) – 36:22	14–0
Z. Bálint (I. Nagy, L. Péter) – 41:44	15–0
Z. Molnár (Z. Antal, A. Góga) – 42:47	16–0
T. Becze (L. Péter, A. Góga) – 46:09	17–0
A. Góga (E. Moldovan) (SH) – 48:40	18–0
I. Nagy (A. Góga, J. Adorján) (PP) – 54:18	19–0
T. Becze (T. Basilidesz, E. Mihály) – 56:13	20–0
R. Gliga (Y. Pysarenko, E. Kósa) – 57:40	21–0
E. Moldovan (O. Bíró, A. Góga) – 58:04	22–0

10 min
Penalties
10 min
57
Shots
15

13 April; 20:15	Croatia	5–2 (1–1, 3–0, 1–1)	China	Dom Sportova; Attendance: 1,200

Game reference

Mate Tomljenović
Goalies
Xie Ming
Liu Zhiwei
Referee:
(Poland) Marczuk Wlodzimierz

B. Rendulić (D. Kanaet, M. Blagus) – 09:08 (PP)	1–0
	1–1	19:32 – Liu Y. (PP)
M. Sertić (N. Senzel) – 22:57	2–1
B. Rendulić (D. Kanaet) – 32:56	3–1
K. Svigir (J. Kučera) – 39:16	4–1
	4–2	40:40 – Zhang W. (Qu Y.) (PP)
D. Kanaet (M. Lovrenčić) – 59:31 (SH, ENG)	5–2

18 min
Penalties
20 min
48
Shots
18

15 April; 13:00	Bulgaria	1–10 (0–3, 1–5, 0–2)	Romania	Dom Sportova; Attendance: 40

Game reference

Konstantin Mihailov
Teodor Asenov
Goalies
Adrian Catrinoi Cornea
Rajmond Fülöp
Referee:
(Slovakia) Robert Mullner

	0–1	03:32 – E. Mihály (T. Becze, T. Basilidesz)
	0–2	05:10 – Z. Antal (PS)
	0–3	12:09 – T. Becze (T. Basilidesz, S. Papp)
	0–4	23:47 – Z. Pál (Z. Antal, Z. Molnár)
	0–5	27:37 – E. Moldován (R. Gliga, Y. Pysarenko)
	0–6	29:04 – S. Papp (Z. Antal, I. Nagy) (PP)
	0–7	32:56 – I. Nagy (L. Péter) (PP)
	0–8	37:12 – E. Mihály (S. Papp, I. Nagy) (SH)
S. Muhachev (R. Asenov) (PP) – 37:41	1–8
	1–9	57:02 – Y. Pysarenko (T. Becze)
	1–10	59:21 – Z. Antal (S. Papp, Z. Pál)

12 min
Penalties
8 min
12
Shots
70

15 April; 16:30	China	3–5 (1–1, 1–3, 1–1)	Iceland	Dom Sportova; Attendance: 100

Game reference

Xie Ming
Goalies
Dennis Hedstrom
Referee:
(Poland) Marczuk Wlodzimierz

	0–1	13:32 – U. Andresson (S. Sigurdsson)
Zhang W. (Wang D.) – 16:36	1–1
	1–2	25:37 – E. Thormodsson (PP) (E. Alengaard, B. Thordarson)
Zhang W. (Qu Y., Li J.) (PP) – 29:09	2–2
	2–3	35:20 – A. Mikaelsson (PP) (J. Gislason, B. Thordarson)
	2–4	38:09 – E. Thormodsson (E. Alengaard) (PP)
Lang B. (Cui Z.) – 40:49	3–4
	3–5	53:13 – J. Gislason (R. Hedström)

16 min
Penalties
12 min
28
Shots
27

15 April; 20:15	Ireland	4–21 (1–7, 0–6, 3–8)	Croatia	Dom Sportova; Attendance: 850

Game reference

Kevin Kelly
Adam Pepper
Goalies
Tihomir Filipec
Referee:
(Italy) Daniel Gamper

	0–1	02:56 – T. Čunko (M. Smerdelj, M. Čunko) (PP)
	0–2	03:42 – M. Novak (M. Tadić, M. Lovrenčić)
	0–3	06:06 – S. Belić (T. Grozaj, V. Žibret)
	0–4	07:02 – M. Lovrenčić (M. Novak, J. Kučera)
	0–5	07:17 – M. Brumerčik (M. Lovrenčić, M. Novak)
D. Morrison (S. Dooley, G. Roberts) (PP) – 14:56	1–5
	1–6	17:45 – V. Žibret (T. Grozaj, K. Svigir)
	1–7	19:56 – D. Kanaet (B. Rendulić, N. Senzel) (PP)
	1–8	27:05 – D. Kanaet (M. Blagus, B. Rendulić)
	1–9	30:56 – M. Lovrenčić (M. Novak, J. Kučera) (PP)
	1–10	32:12 – M. Ljubić (M. Blagus, B. Rendulić)
	1–11	33:33 – V. Žibret (K. Svigir, M. Sertić)
	1–12	35:41 – M. Smerdelj (I. Šijan, T. Čunko) (PP)
	1–13	37:44 – D. Kanaet (M. Ljubić, B. Rendulić) (PP)
	1–14	40:14 – M. Novak (J. Kučera, M. Lovrenčić)
G. Roberts (D. Morrison, S. Dooley) (SH) – 42:58	2–14
	2–15	40:14 – T. Čunko (M. Čunko, N. Senzel) (PP)
	2–16	47:37 – K. Svigir (M. Brumerčik, M. Ljubić) (SH)
	2–17	49:33 – T. Grozaj (M. Čunko, M. Lovrenčić)
S. Dooley (S. Hamill, M. Morrison) (PP) – 50:47	3–17
	3–18	51:02 – V. Žibret (T. Grozaj, K. Svigir)
	3–19	54:31 – B. Rendulić (S. Belić, M. Lovrenčić) (PP)
M. Morrison (J. McCrainor, G. Roberts) – 56:02	4–19
	4–20	58:48 – K. Svigir (B. Rendulić, M. Sertić)
	4–21	59:07 – D. Kanaet (K. Svigir, S. Belić)

20 min
Penalties
12 min
8
Shots
65

16 April; 13:00	Bulgaria	6–12 (0–2, 4–5, 2–5)	China	Dom Sportova; Attendance: 70

Game reference

Konstantin Mihailov
Teodor Asenov
Goalies
Liu Zhiwei
Referee:
(Italy) Daniel Gamper

	0–1	07:31 – Liu Y. (Liu W., Hu T.)
	0–2	11:55 – Cui Z. (Lang B., Zhang H.)
	0–3	22:35 – Liu W. (Liu Y., Hu T.)
M. Boyadjiev (R. Asenov, M. Giurov) (PP2) – 28:55	1–3
S. Muhachev (M. Milanov, L. Giumov) – 30:52	2–3
	2–4	33:34 – Fu N. (Zhang H., Lang B.)
	2–5	34:22 – Liu Y. (Liu W., Meng Q.)
	2–6	37:01 – Liu Y. (Liu L.)
	2–7	37:12 – Meng Q. (Liu Y., Liu W.)
S. Muhachev (M. Boyadjiev, R. Asenov) – 39:00	3–7
S. Muhachev (M. Boyadjiev, R. Asenov) – 39:22	4–7
	4–8	42:14 – Fu N. (Liu W., Liu L.)
	4–9	45:37 – Liu W. (Liu Y., Meng Q.)
	4–10	48:20 – Cui Z. (Lang B., Meng Q.) (PP)
	4–11	53:26 – Fu N. (Lang B., Cui Z.)
M. Giurov (M. Boyadjiev, R. Asenov) – 55:02	5–11
	5–12	59:19 – Zhang W. (Wang D., Fu T.)
L. Giumov (M. Boyadjiev, S. Muhachev) – 59:40	6–12

4 min
Penalties
6 min
25
Shots
36

16 April; 16:30	Iceland	14–0 (6–0, 5–0, 3–0)	Ireland	Dom Sportova; Attendance: 100

Game reference

Omar Skúlason
Dennis Hedstrom
Goalies
Kevin Kelly
Adam Pepper
Referee:
(Norway) Tommy Soestumoen

E. Alengaard (E. Thormodsson) – 00:12	1–0
B. Arnason (E. Thormodsson, R. Hedström) (PP) – 01:07	2–0
A. Mikaelsson (B. Thordarson, J. Gíslason) (PP) – 03:30	3–0
E. Thormodsson (E. Alengaard, B. Jakobsson) – 13:50	4–0
M. Sigurdarson (S. Hrafnsson) (SH) – 15:12	5–0
O. Björnsson (B. Thordarson, B. Arnason) – 18:06	6–0
A. Mikaelsson (J. Gíslason, R. Pålsson) – 22:03	7–0
E. Thormodsson (E. Alengaard, I. Jönsson) – 23:24	8–0
G. Thormodsson (E. Thormodsson, B. Arnason) (PP) – 26:07	9–0
A. Mikaelsson (J. Gíslason) (PP) – 35:29	10–0
I. Elíasson (A. Mikaelsson, J. Gíslason) (PP) – 39:35	11–0
G. Thormodsson (E. Alengaard, U. Andresson) (PP) – 52:05	12–0
S. Sigurdsson (S. Hrafnsson, M. Sigurdarson) – 54:57	13–0
D. Adel (O. Björnsson, R. Hedström) (PP) – 58:11	14–0

10 min
Penalties
38 min
60
Shots
10

16 April; 20:15	Croatia	1–2 (1–0, 0–1, 0–1)	Romania	Dom Sportova; Attendance: 3,000

Game reference

Mate Tomljenović
Goalies
Adrian Catrinoi Cornea
Referee:
(Slovakia) Robert Mullner

B. Rendulić (M. Tadić, D. Kanaet) – 05:46	1–0
	1–1	25:17 – Z. Antal (Z. Molnár) (PP)
	1–2	44:49 – M. Petres (E. Moldovan) (PP)

18 min
Penalties
12 min
29
Shots
33

=== Scoring leaders ===
List shows the top ten skaters sorted by points, then goals.

Player	GP	G	A	Pts	+/−	PIM
(Croatia) Marko Lovrenčić	5	8	10	18	+12	2
(Croatia) Borna Rendulić	5	8	9	17	+10	6
(Croatia) Dominik Kanaet	5	7	9	16	+12	2
(Romania) Zsombor Antal	5	4	10	14	+8	4
(Romania) István Nagy	5	3	8	11	+13	3
(Iceland) Egill Thormodsson	5	6	4	10	+4	0
(Romania) Szabolcs Papp	5	5	5	10	+14	0
(Croatia) Mislav Blagus	5	4	6	10	+11	0
(Iceland) Emil Alengaard	5	2	8	10	+3	2
(China) Zhang Weiyang	5	8	1	9	−3	4

GP = Games played; G = Goals; A = Assists; Pts = Points; +/− = Plus/minus; PIM = Penalties in minutes; POS = Position
Source: IIHF.com

=== Leading goaltenders ===
Only the top five goaltenders, based on save percentage, who have played 40% of their team's minutes are included in this list.

Player	TOI	SA	GA	GAA	Sv%	SO
(Croatia) Mate Tomljenović	208:04	68	5	1.44	92.65	1
(Romania) Adrian Catrinoi Cornea	243:44	86	7	1.72	91.86	0
(Iceland) Dennis Hedstrom	239:09	140	14	3.51	90.00	0
(China) Xie Ming	183:42	93	12	3.92	87.10	1
(Bulgaria) Konstantin Mihailov	279:30	242	35	7.51	85.54	0

TOI = Time on ice (minutes:seconds); SA = Shots against; GA = Goals against; GAA = Goals against average; Sv% = Save percentage; SO = Shutouts
Source: IIHF.com

=== Tournament Awards ===
Best players selected by the directorate

- Best Goaltender: Mate Tomljenović (CRO)
- Best Forward: Marko Lovrenčić (CRO)
- Best Defenceman: Szabolcs Papp (ROU)

Best players

Best player of each team selected by the coaches.

- Konstantin Mihaylov (BUL)
- Zhang Weiyang (CHN)
- Borna Rendulić (CRO)
- Mark Morrison (IRL)
- Egill Thormodsson (ISL)
- Szabolcs Papp (ROU)
