= Artipelag =

Art museum in Stockholm, Sweden

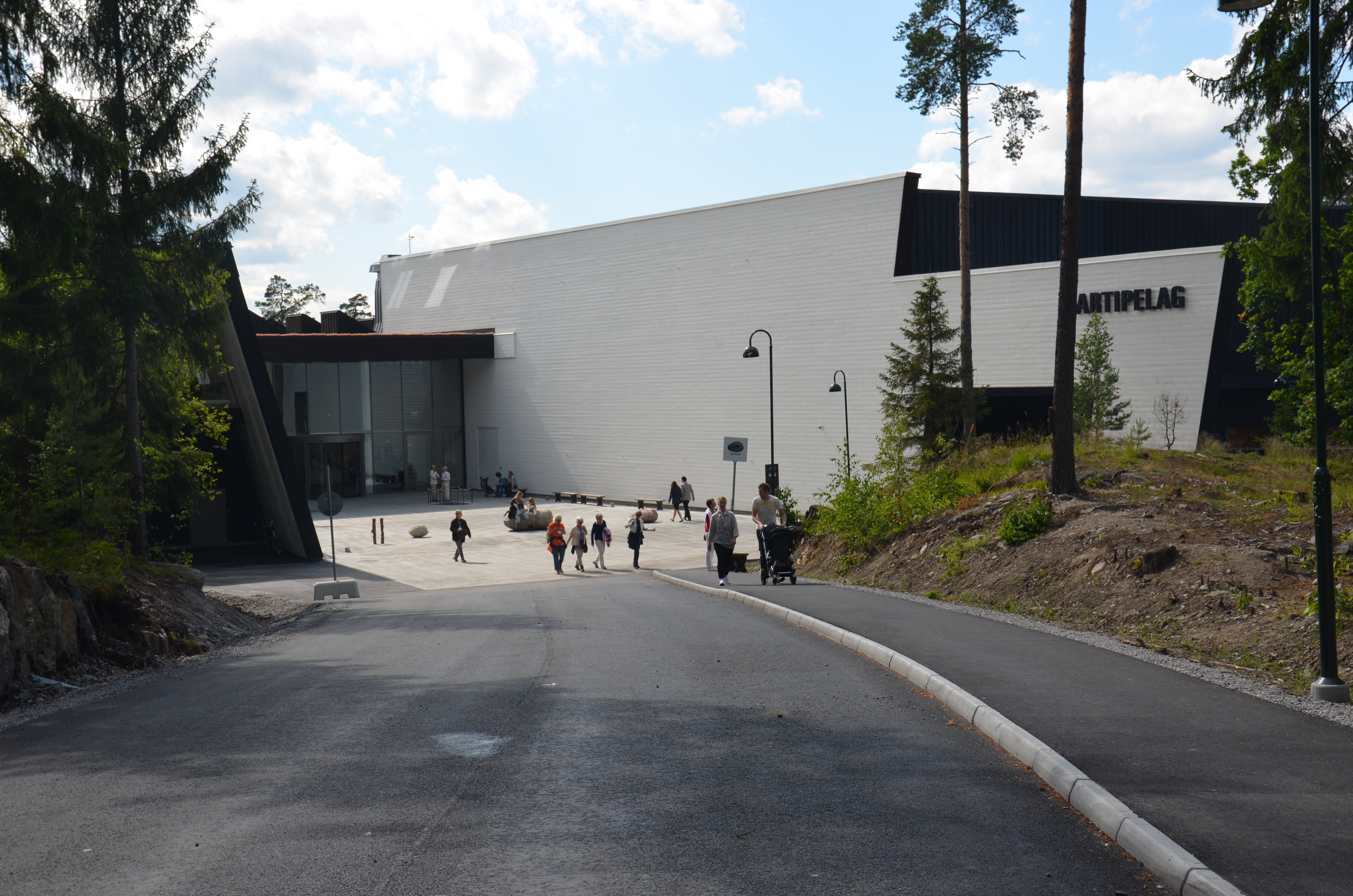
- Entrance to Artipelag
- Established: June 2012
- Location: Stockholm, Sweden
- Coordinates: 59°18′25″N 18°20′52″E
- Website: www.artipelag.se

Artipelag is an art museum located on the archipelago in Stockholm, Sweden. Opened in June 2012, the building was designed by the late architect Johan Nyrén to fit into the surrounding landscape. The building covers an area of approximately 10,000 square meters and includes 3,000 square meters of art galleries and has 22 acres of surrounding natural scenery.

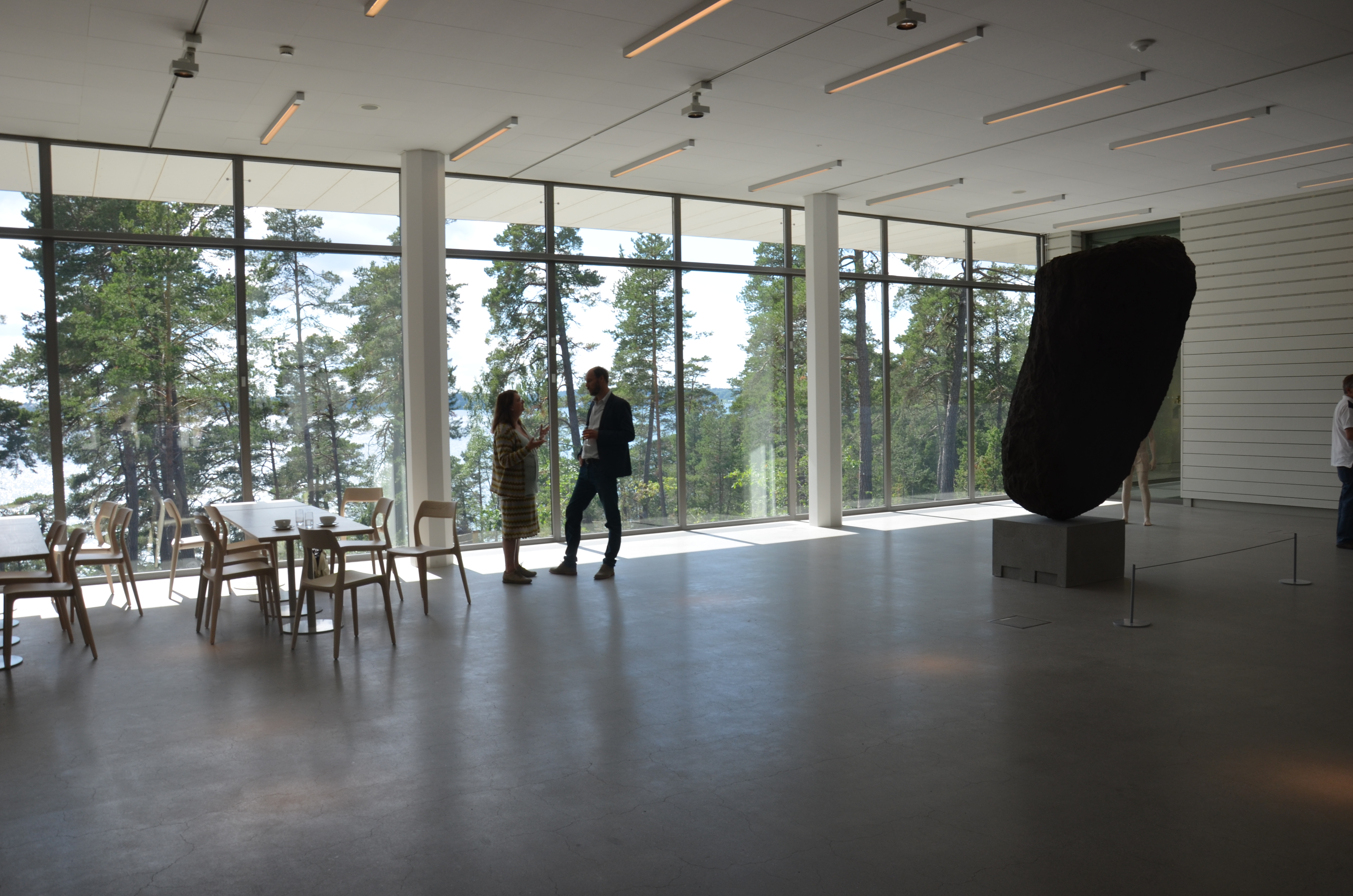
View over the bay Baggensfjärden from the main hall

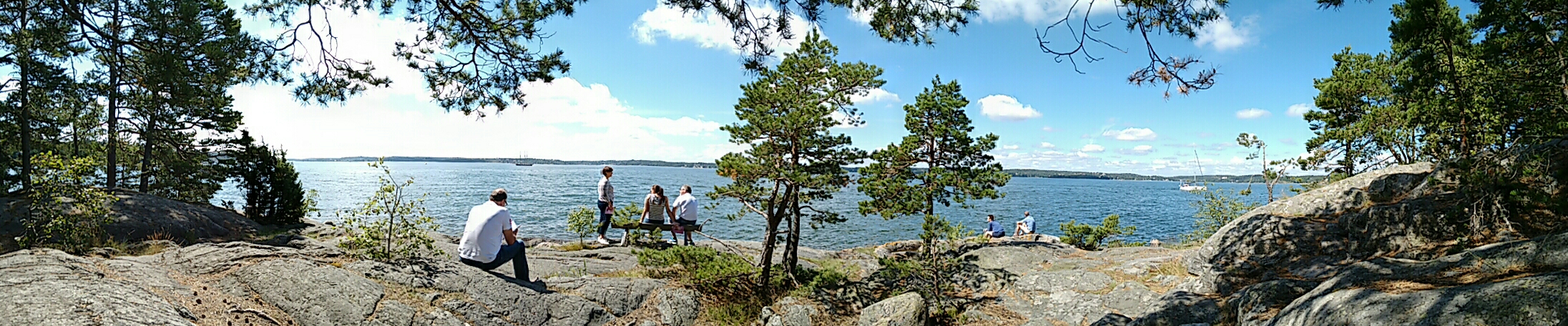
View over the bay Baggensfjärden from the cliffs beneath the museum

According to The New York Times, the museum was the "brainchild of Björn Jakobson, who founded the Swedish infant-care products company Babybjörn in 1961, and his wife, Lillemor." The parent company Lillemor Design provided funding (approximately $69 million according to estimates in Swedish media.

Notable exhibitions have included works by William Wegman and Candida Höfer. The artistic director of Artipelag is Bo Nilsson.

The name of the museum is a pun on "arkipelag," the Swedish word for "archipelago."

== Exhibitions ==
The legacy of Andy Warhol April 15, 2016 - September 25, 2016

The Monochrome Symphony – Single-coloured Constellations of Art, Design, Fashion & Music October 16, 2015 – March 28, 2016

Land meets water – European and American photography from 1860 to the present May 29, 2015 – September 27, 2015

Mats Theselius – Urban Cowboy July 8, 2015 – August 23, 2015

Carouschka – The woman on the island April 29, 2015 – June 28, 2015

Earth Matters February 6, 2015 – May 3, 2015

HERE/NOW: A physical encounter in time and space October 17, 2014 – January 6, 2015

No man is an island – Artistic forays into the Stockholm archipelago May 23, 2014 – September 28, 2014

Reflections on mankind and the biosphere July 11, 2014 – August 17, 2014

The visible – Swedish contemporary photography February 7, 2014 – May 11, 2014

Blackboard – Teaching and learning from art October 11, 2013 – January 19, 2014

Hello Nature. How to Draw, Paint, Cook and Find Your Way May 25, 2013 – September 29, 2013

One, two, tree! June 14, 2013 – August 21, 2013

Poul Gernes / Sidekick / Cosima von Bonin March 8, 2013 – May 12, 2013

Enlighted: Electric light as the fairy of art October 27, 2012 – February 17, 2013

Candida Höfer – Affinities, Affinitäten, Affiniteter June 30, 2012 – October 28, 2012

Genius Loci June 3, 2012 – September 30, 2012

== Photo gallery ==
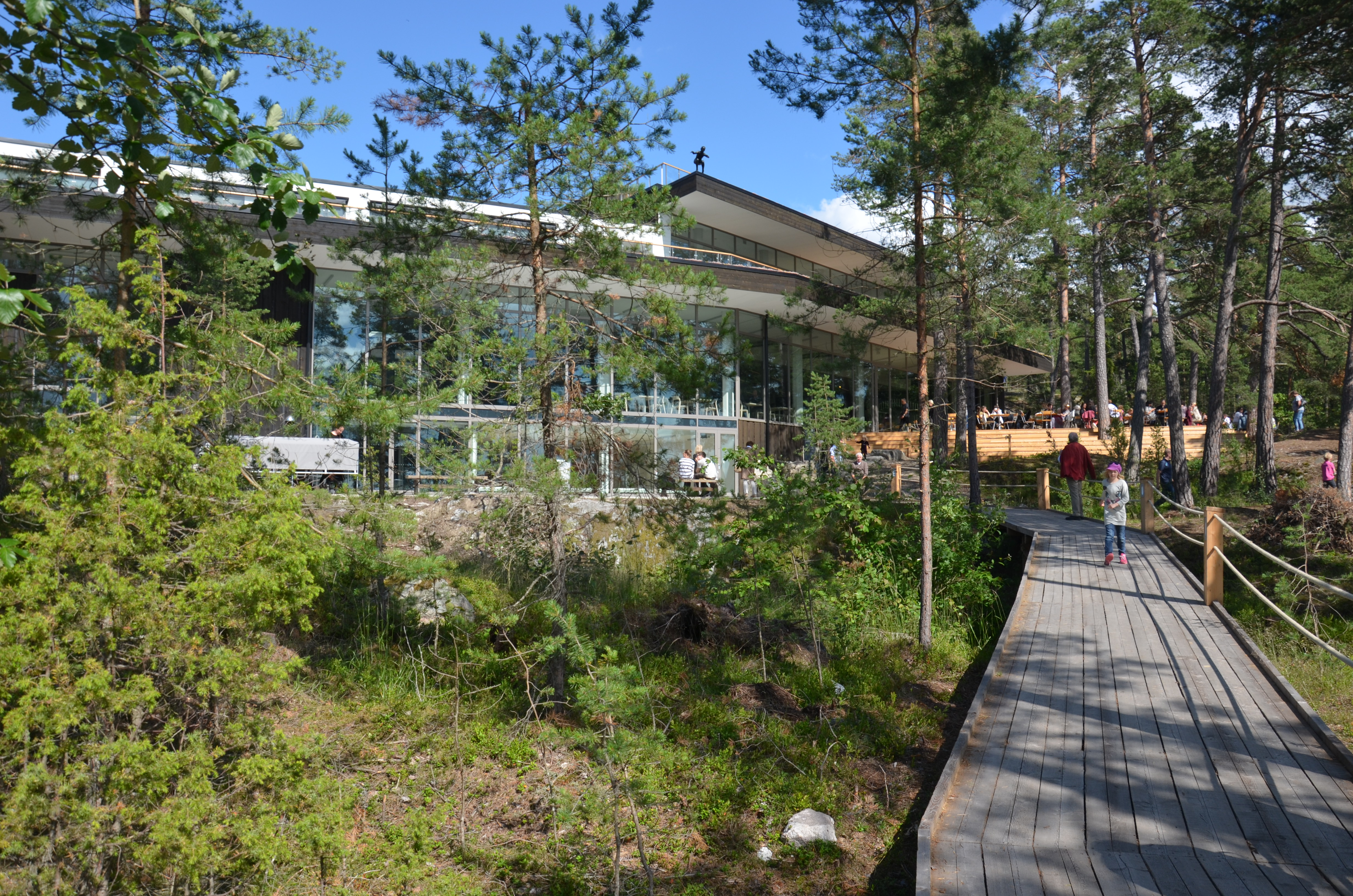
The façade as seen from the water

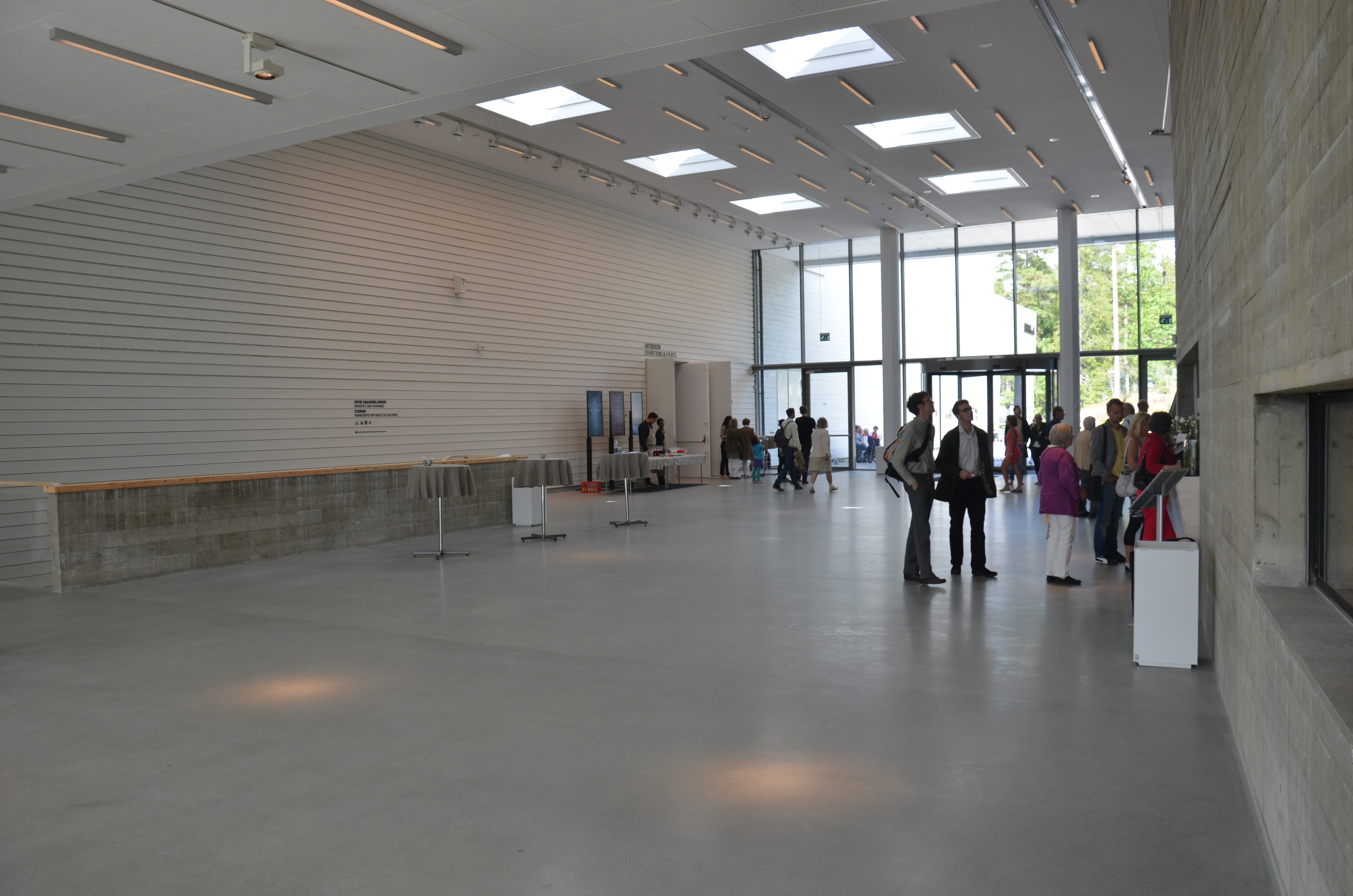
The entrance seen from the entrance hall

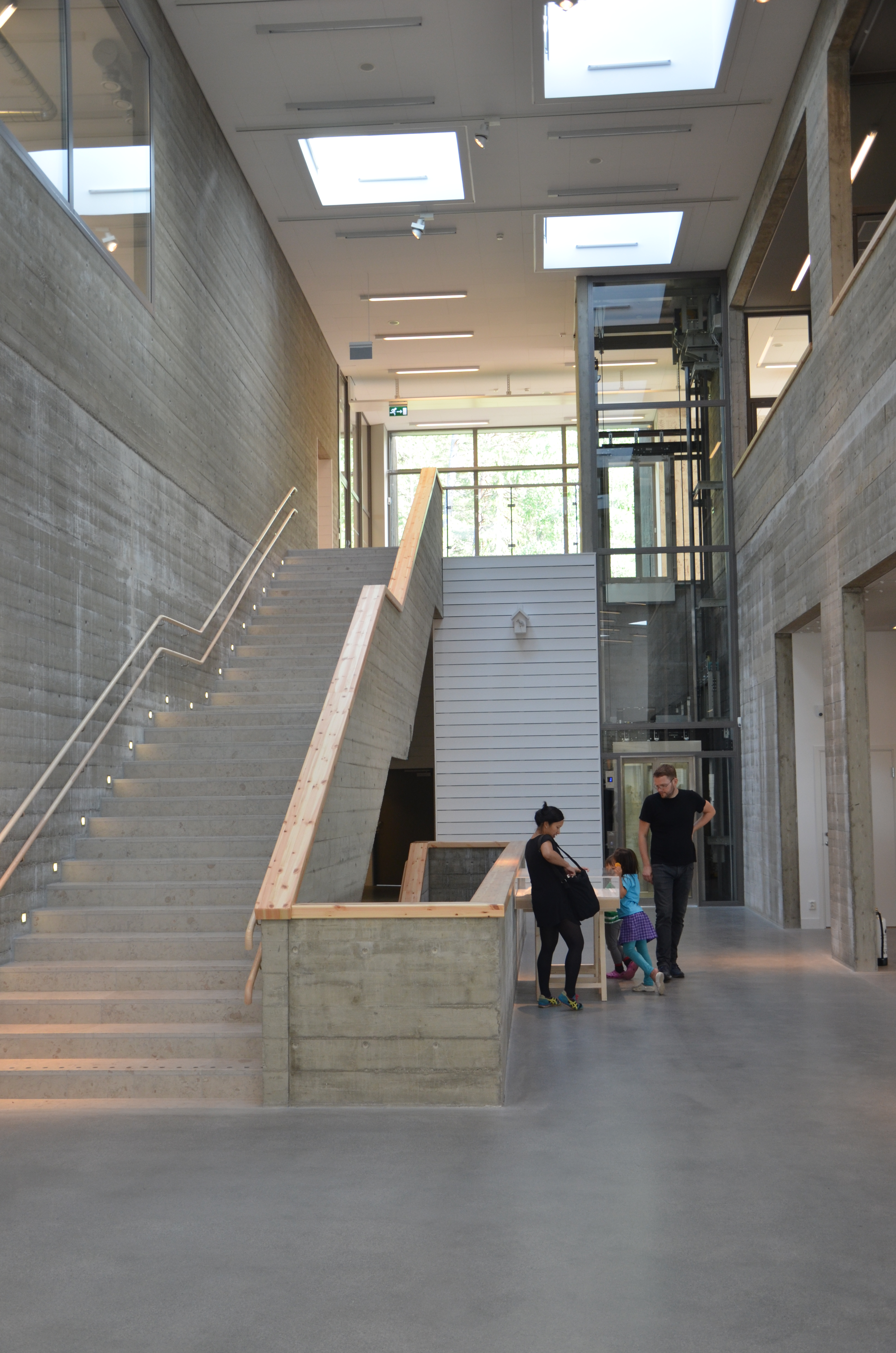
Stairwell

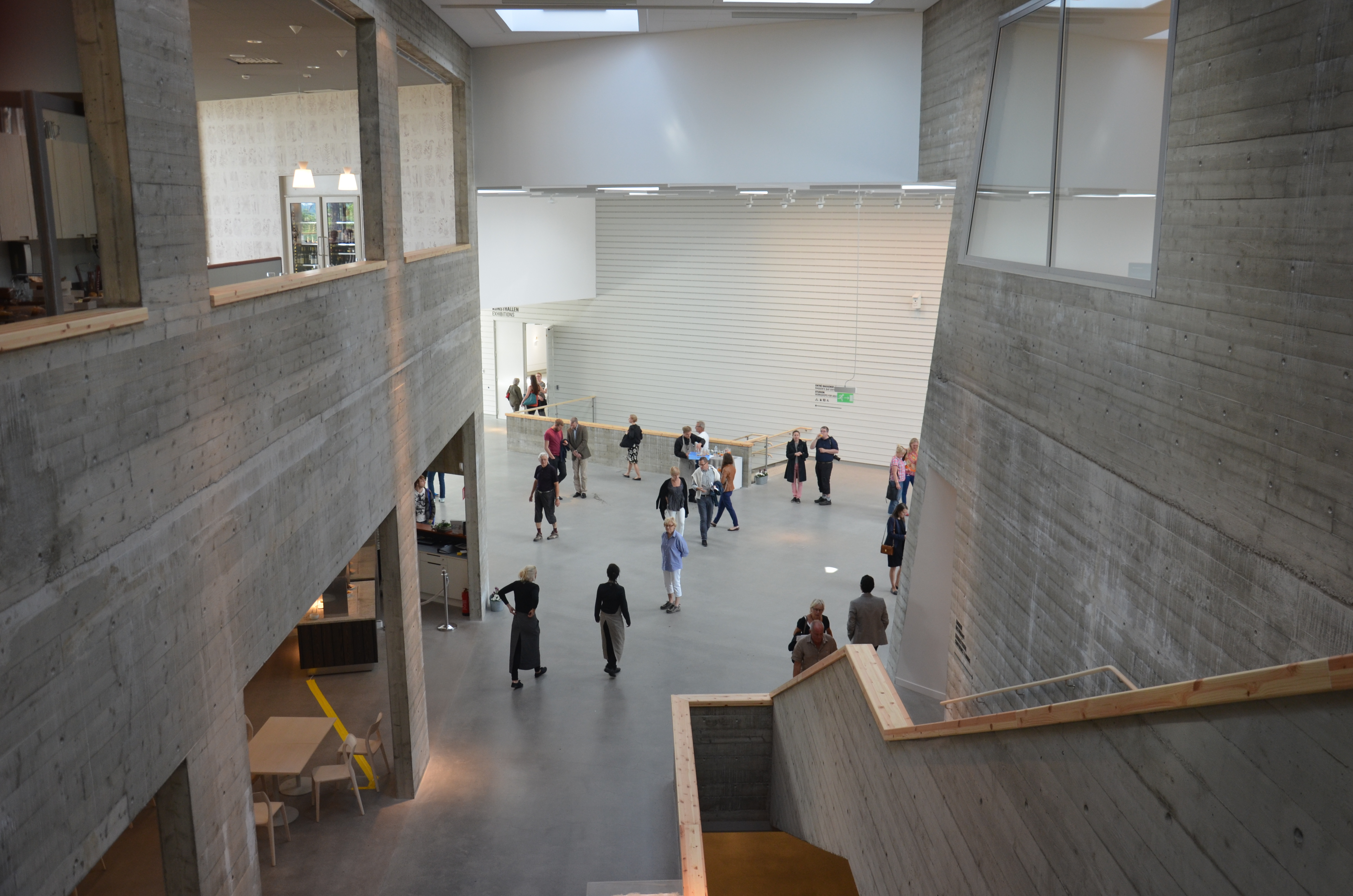
The entrance hall seen from the second floor

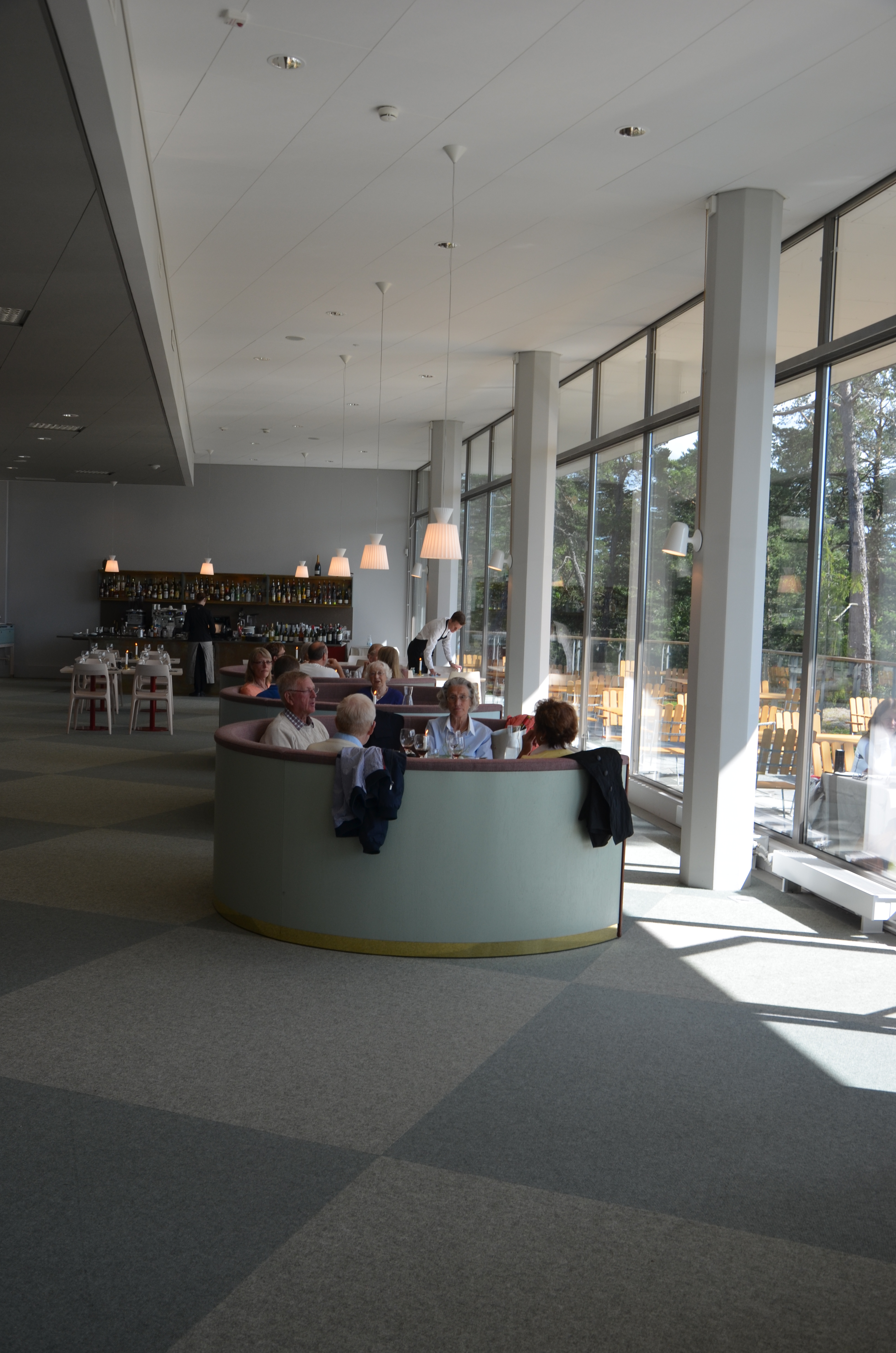
The restaurant

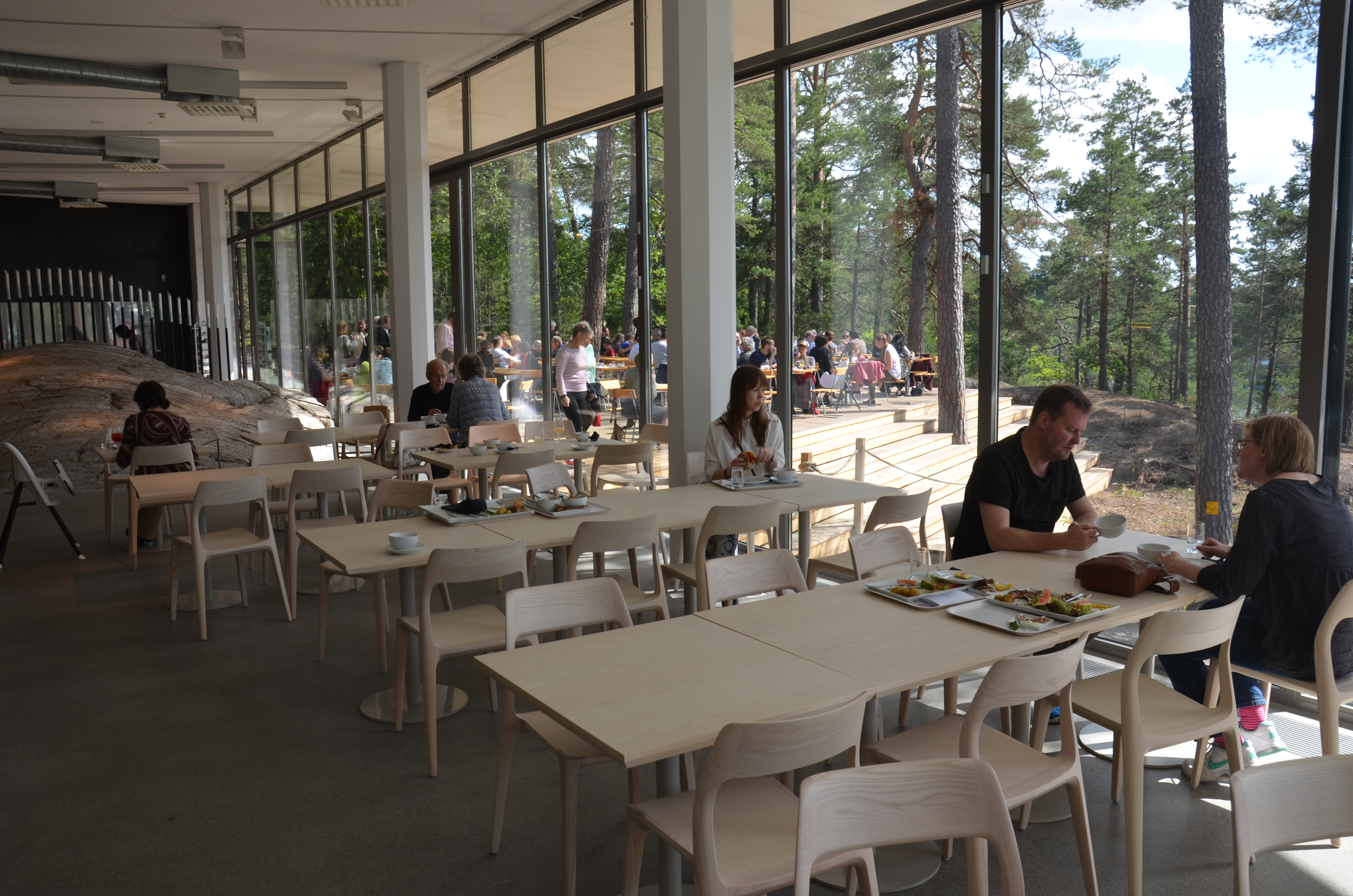
The cafeteria

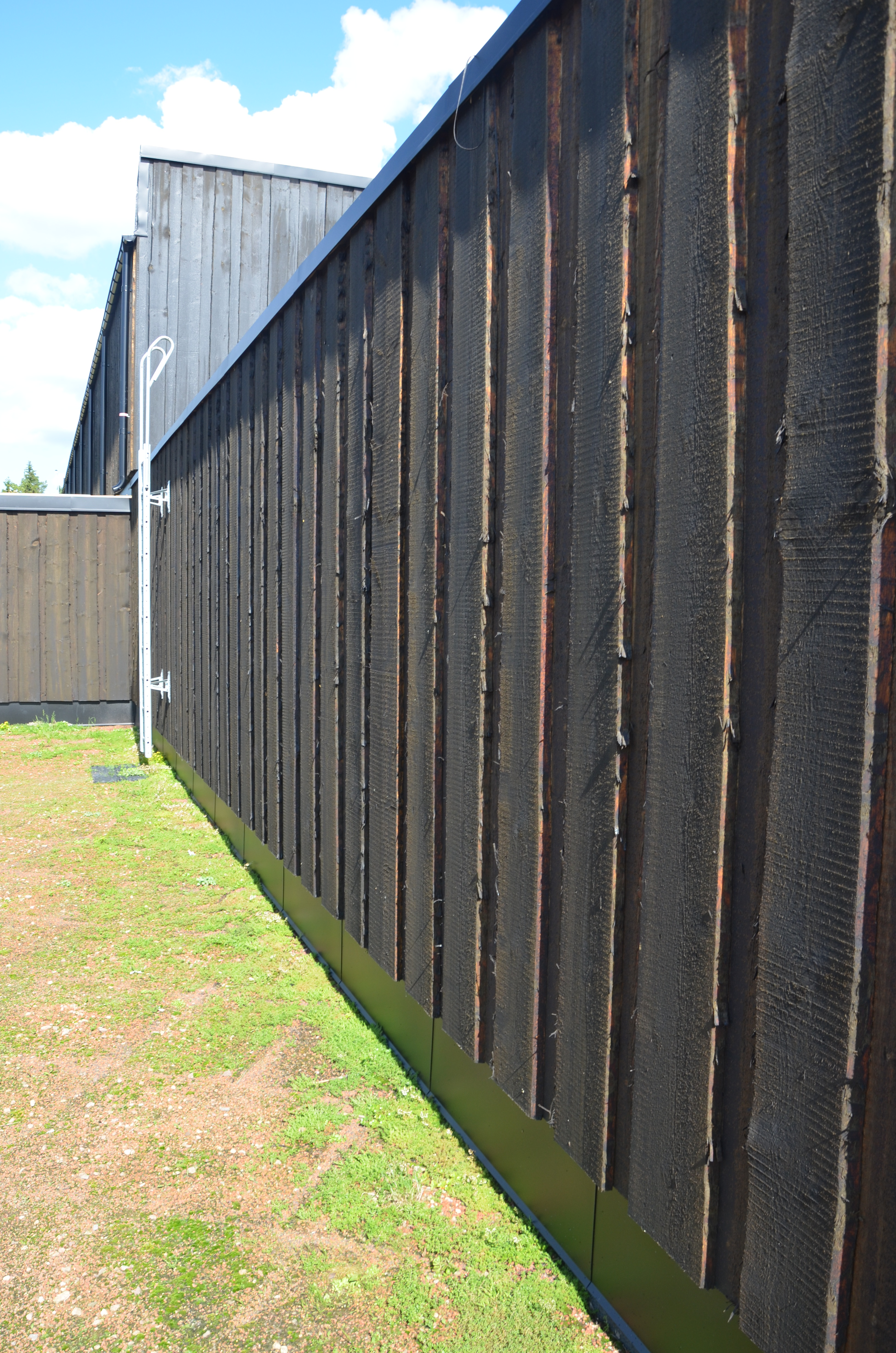
Tarred outer wall

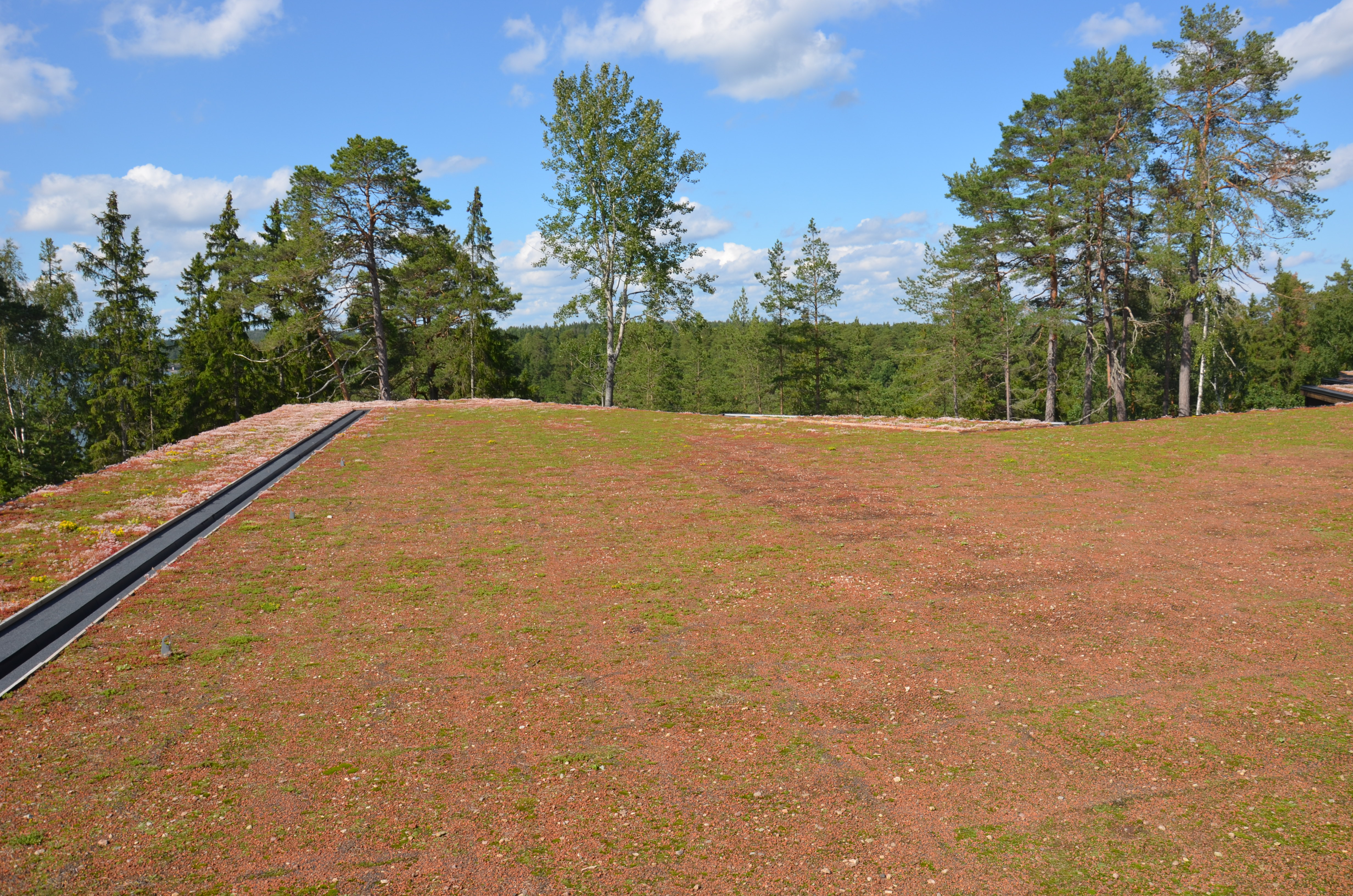
The sedum roof over the gallery

== See also ==
- List of museums in Stockholm
