= Šimon Stránský =

Czech professional ice hockey player

- Born: 21 December 1997 (age 28) Ostrava, Czech Republic
- Height: 5 ft 11 in (180 cm)
- Weight: 178 lb (81 kg; 12 st 10 lb)
- Position: Centre / Left Wing
- Shoots: Left
- Liiga team Former teams: Ilves; HC Vítkovice; HC Kometa Brno; Mikkelin Jukurit; HC Litvínov
- Playing career: 2017–present

Šimon Stránský (born 21 December 1997) is a Czech professional ice hockey player who currently plays with Kometa Brno in the Czech Extraliga.

== Playing career ==
Stránský began his career with the youth teams of HC Vítkovice Steel in his hometown of Ostrava (winning the national championship at that level), then spent his last three junior seasons in Canada with the Prince Albert Raiders of the Western Hockey League; his form there led to him being considered likely to be selected in the 2016 NHL entry draft, but he was passed over.

He returned home in 2017, again contracted to Vítkovice; he soon achieved his senior debut and first points in the same year and was a regular (148 regular and playoffs games, 59 points) over the next three seasons, also serving short loans at local second-tier teams AZ Havířov and HC RT Torax Poruba, followed by a further loan spell at HC Kometa Brno of the Extraliga. During this period he made his first appearance for the senior Czech national team against Austria in April 2019, having already represented the under-18s and under-20s at the respective World Championships.

Stránský moved abroad again in 2020, spending two seasons in Finland with Liiga team Mikkelin Jukurit (they unexpectedly finished second in the 2021–22 regular standings, to which he contributed 60 games and 37 points), but again thereafter returned to the Czech Republic to sign for HC Litvínov on a two-year deal. After Litvínov were eliminated in the first round of the playoffs by eventual champions Oceláři Třinec, he chose to exercise a release clause at the end of the first year and switched to Finland again, signing with Ilves for the 2023–24 season.

== Family ==
Šimon is a member of a noted ice hockey family: his grandfather is the Czechoslovak player Vladimír Stránský while his uncle Vladan represented Australia after playing there for several years; his father Darek had a short playing spell but a long career as a coach, mainly of youth teams for professional clubs, and elder brother Matěj Stránský is also a Czech international.
