= Matěj Stránský =

Czech ice hockey player (born 1993)

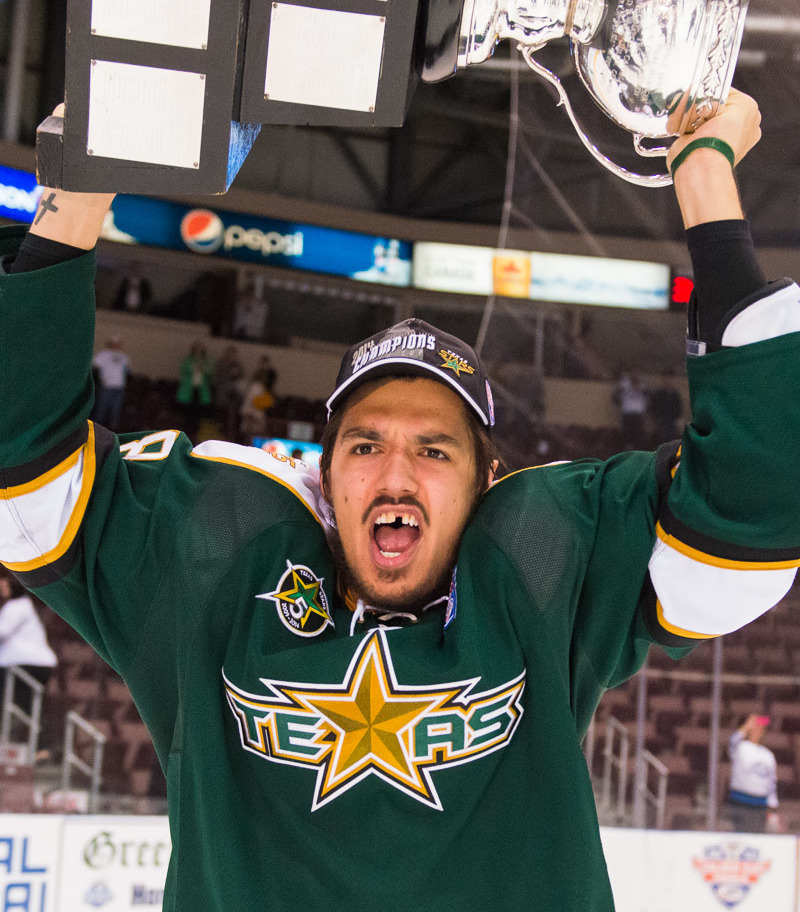
- Born: 11 July 1993 (age 32) Ostrava, Czech Republic
- Height: 1.91 m (6 ft 3 in)
- Weight: 93 kg (205 lb; 14 st 9 lb)
- Position: Winger
- Shoots: Right
- NL team Former teams: HC Davos; Severstal Cherepovets; Mora IK; Oceláři Třinec
- National team: Czech Republic
- NHL draft: 165th overall, 2011; Dallas Stars
- Playing career: 2013–present

Matěj Stránský (born 11 July 1993) is a Czech professional ice hockey player who is a winger for HC Davos of the National League (NL) and the Czech national team.

== Playing career ==
He was drafted 165th overall in the 2011 NHL entry draft by the Dallas Stars and signed an entry-level contract on 3 April 2012, and represented the Czech Republic at the 2021 and 2022 IIHF World Championship, where he won a bronze medal.

== International play ==
Medal record

Representing Czech Republic

World Championships
Gold medal – first place	2024 Czechia	
Bronze medal – third place	2022 Finland	

Stránský represented Czechia at the 2024 IIHF World Championship and won a gold medal.

== Personal life ==
His grandfather is the Czechoslovak ice hockey player Vladimír Stránský while his uncle Vladan represented Australia after playing there for several years; younger brother Šimon Stránský is also a Czech international.

== Career statistics ==
=== Regular season and playoffs ===
			Regular season					Playoffs
Season	Team	League	GP	G	A	Pts	PIM	GP	G	A	Pts	PIM
2007–08	HC Vítkovice Steel	CZE U18	43	5	14	19	22	3	1	1	2	2
2008–09	HC Vítkovice Steel	CZE U18	46	40	23	63	68	7	5	5	10	6
2009–10	HC Vítkovice Steel	CZE U18	43	17	33	50	112	2	1	2	3	4
2009–10	HC Vítkovice Steel	CZE U20	11	2	1	3	4	—	—	—	—	—
2010–11	Saskatoon Blades	WHL	71	14	12	26	53	10	3	6	9	8
2011–12	Saskatoon Blades	WHL	70	39	42	81	75	4	1	1	2	2
2012–13	Saskatoon Blades	WHL	72	40	45	85	88	4	0	0	0	4
2013–14	Texas Stars	AHL	65	9	14	23	53	21	1	4	5	10
2014–15	Texas Stars	AHL	70	7	12	19	60	2	0	0	0	0
2015–16	Texas Stars	AHL	74	23	16	39	63	4	0	1	1	4
2016–17	Texas Stars	AHL	76	27	20	47	60	—	—	—	—	—
2017–18	Severstal Cherepovets	KHL	42	8	4	12	41	4	1	0	1	25
2018–19	Severstal Cherepovets	KHL	17	3	3	6	12	—	—	—	—	—
2018–19	Mora IK	SHL	24	8	6	14	16	—	—	—	—	—
2019–20	HC Oceláři Třinec	ELH	53	23	22	45	46	—	—	—	—	—
2020–21	HC Oceláři Třinec	ELH	50	33	19	52	64	16	5	10	15	22
2021–22	HC Davos	NL	49	26	20	46	65	11	4	3	7	2
2022–23	HC Davos	NL	52	25	17	42	26	5	1	1	2	8
2023–24	HC Davos	NL	51	22	19	41	24	7	1	1	2	4
2024–25	HC Davos	NL	51	24	15	39	30	10	3	7	10	2
AHL totals			285	66	62	128	236	27	1	5	6	14

=== International ===
Year	Team	Event	Result	GP	G	A	Pts	PIM
2021	Czech Republic	WC	7th	7	1	2	3	2
2022	Czech Republic	OG	9th	4	0	1	1	0
2022	Czechia	WC	3rd place, bronze medalist(s)	10	0	1	1	2
2024	Czechia	WC	1st place, gold medalist(s)	10	3	1	4	6
2025	Czechia	WC	6th	8	3	0	3	4
2026	Czechia	OG	8th	5	1	1	2	0
Senior totals				44	8	6	14	14
