= Vladan Stransky =

Australian ice hockey player

- Born: 12 February 1973 (age 53) Czechoslovakia
- Height: 5 ft 9 in (175 cm)
- Weight: 179 lb (81 kg; 12 st 11 lb)
- Position: Forward
- Shot: Right
- Played for: TJ Vítkovice; Nippon Paper Cranes; Sydney Bears
- National team: Australia
- Playing career: 1990–2011

Vladan Stransky (born 12 February 1973) is an Australian ice hockey player who played for the Sydney Bears in the Australian Ice Hockey League between 2002 and 2010 and is a former member of the Australian national ice hockey team. Stransky has also played in the Czechoslovak First Ice Hockey League for HC Vitkovice, the Japan Ice Hockey League for the Nippon Paper Cranes, and in the 2. národní hokejová liga for HC Poruba.

== Playing career ==
Stransky first played ice hockey in 1990 for HC Vitkovice of the Czechoslovak First Ice Hockey League. The following season he moved to Canada and joined the Dauphin Kings of the Manitoba Junior Hockey League for part of the 1992–93 before he moved to Japan and joined the Nippon Paper Cranes of the Japan Ice Hockey League. In 1999 Stransky joined HC Poruba of the 2. národní hokejová liga where he stayed for three seasons. Following the end of the end of the 2001–02 season Stransky moved to Australia and joined the Sydney Bears of the Australian Ice Hockey League (AIHL). During the 2008 season he scored the most assists in the AIHL with 41.

Stransky was first called up to represent Australia in 2009 where he joined the national senior team to compete in the 2009 IIHF World Championship Division I Group A tournament being held in Vilnius, Lithuania. Australia lost the tournament and were relegated to Division II for the following year. In 2011 Stransky was called up to represent Australia for the 2011 IIHF World Championship Division II Group A tournament being held in Melbourne, Australia. Australia won the tournament after winning all four of their games and finishing on top of the group standings.

== Personal life ==
Stransky was born on 12 February 1973 in Czechoslovakia. He first started skating at the age of four. Stransky's father Vladimír also played ice hockey and played for the Czechoslovak national team, while his younger brother Vít also played briefly in Australia; nephews Matěj and Šimon Stránský (children of elder brother Darek) are both Czech internationals.

In 2001 he moved to Australia where he met his wife, Nicole. In 2009 he became an Australian citizen while also retaining his Czech citizenship. Stransky currently lives in Mount Colah, New South Wales, Australia.

== Career statistics ==
Vladan Stransky
Medal record

Representing Australia

Ice hockey

Ice Hockey World Championships
Gold medal – first place	2011 Melbourne	Division II Group A

Regular season and playoffs

			Regular season					Playoffs
Season	Team	League	GP	G	A	Pts	PIM	GP	G	A	Pts	PIM
1990–91	HC Vitkovice	TCH	2	2	0	2	0	–	–	–	–	–
1992–93	Dauphin Kings	MJHL
1992–93	Nippon Paper Cranes	JIHL
1999-00	HC Poruba	CZE 3	45	9	18	27	32	–	–	–	–	–
2000-01	HC Poruba	CZE 3	32	16	14	30	30	2	0	0	0	2
2001–02	HC Poruba	CZE 3	7	1	2	3	2	–	–	–	–	–
2002	Sydney Bears	AIHL	10	11	6	17	54	–	–	–	–	–
2003	Sydney Bears	AIHL	5	1	9	10	6	–	–	–	–	–
2004	Sydney Bears	AIHL	9	4	4	8	8	–	–	–	–	–
2005	Sydney Bears	AIHL	25	10	23	33	47	–	–	–	–	–
2006	Sydney Bears	AIHL	24	27	30	57	50	–	–	–	–	–
2007	Sydney Bears	AIHL	11	4	9	13	10	–	–	–	–	–
2008	Sydney Bears	AIHL	26	22	41	63	46	1	1	1	2	2
2009	Sydney Bears	AIHL	15	12	12	24	85	–	–	–	–	–
2010	Sydney Bears	AIHL	12	9	15	24	4	–	–	–	–	–

International

Year	Team	Comp	GP	G	A	Pts	PIM
2009	Australia	2009 IIHF World Championship Division I Group A	5	1	2	3	8
2011	Australia	2011 IIHF World Championship Division II Group A	4	0	4	4	8
