= Nathan Walker =

Welsh-Australian ice hockey player (born 1994)

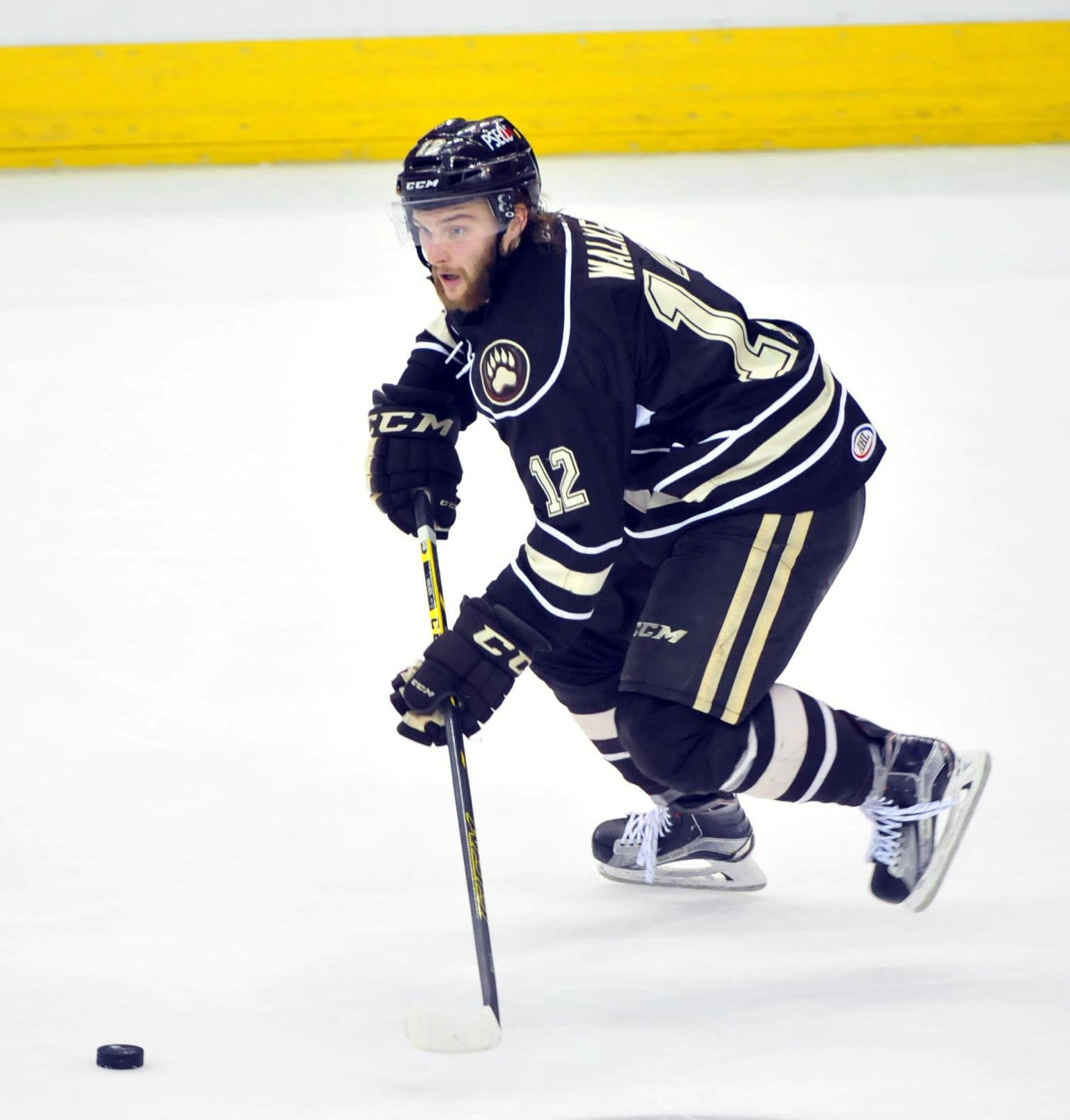
- Walker with the Hershey Bears in 2016
- Born: 7 February 1994 (age 32) Cardiff, Wales
- Height: 5 ft 9 in (175 cm)
- Weight: 186 lb (84 kg; 13 st 4 lb)
- Position: Centre
- Shoots: Left
- NHL team (P) Cur. team Former teams: St. Louis Blues; Springfield Thunderbirds (AHL); Washington Capitals; Edmonton Oilers; Vítkovice Steel; Sydney Ice Dogs
- National team: Australia
- NHL draft: 89th overall, 2014; Washington Capitals
- Playing career: 2010–present

Nathan Walker (born 7 February 1994) is an Welsh-born Australian professional ice hockey player who is a forward for the Springfield Thunderbirds of the American Hockey League (AHL) while under contract to the St. Louis Blues of the National Hockey League (NHL). Walker, who was born in Wales, grew up in Australia and first played ice hockey there. He moved to the Czech Republic in 2007 in order to further his career, and joined the junior program of HC Vítkovice, a member of the Czech Extraliga. He first played for the senior team in 2011, becoming the first Australian ice hockey player to play for a professional senior team in Europe. Along with HC Vítkovice, Walker was loaned to several lower-level Czech teams.

In 2013 Walker signed with the Youngstown Phantoms of the junior United States Hockey League, moving to North America for the first time. He attended the training camp of the Washington Capitals in 2013 and signed with their AHL affiliate Hershey. Walker represents Australia internationally, and first played for them at the 2011 IIHF World Championship Division II tournament, where he helped his team win their group and earn a promotion to Division I for the following year. Passed over in the previous two NHL entry drafts, Walker was selected by the Washington Capitals in the third round of the 2014 NHL entry draft, the first Australian selected in an NHL draft. After a few years in the AHL, Walker joined the Capitals in 2017, the first Australian to play in the NHL. He was placed on waivers and claimed by the Edmonton Oilers in the same season, but was re-acquired by the Capitals after only two games with the Oilers, and won the Stanley Cup with the Capitals in 2018.

== Playing career ==
=== Australia and Czech Republic ===
Walker began playing hockey at age six and by thirteen he was in a league with players as old as twenty and able to outplay them. During the 2007 season he played in both the under-14 and under-16 leagues. During 14 U14 games he recorded 77 goals and 25 assists for 102 points, a record for the league; the second leading scorer had 70 points in 24 games. Walker had similar numbers in the U16 league; he scored 69 points in 16 games to again lead the league in scoring, with the second highest total being 53 points in 20 games.

As Walker was dominating the local competition, he began to look for other options. In 2007 his coach Ivan Manco, who came from Slovakia, arranged for Walker to tryout for HC Vítkovice in the Czech Republic, where Manco knew one of the coaches. Walker impressed the team enough to be given a place on their under-18 junior team. In 2009–10 he recorded 42 points in 28 games for the U18 team and earned a chance to play for the U20 team.

During the Czech offseasons, Walker sought out a higher level of domestic competition by returning home to play for the Sydney Ice Dogs of the Australian Ice Hockey League. making his debut in 2010 at 16 years old. He played four games in his rookie AIHL season, registering his first point with an assist. Returning for three games in the 2011 season, he netted his first AIHL goal and added another assist.

On 9 October 2011, Walker made his debut for the senior HC Vítkovice club in the Czech Extraliga, making him the first Australian to play professionally in Europe; he was also the youngest player in the Extraliga. HC Vítkovice was invited to the 2011 Spengler Cup and in their first game against Canada Walker scored the only goal for Vítkovice. He became the youngest player to score in Spengler Cup history and was named player of the game for Vítkovice. With the conclusion of the 2011–12 Czech Extraliga season, HC Vítkovice loaned Walker to HC Olomouc of the 1. národní hokejová liga, the second-highest league in the Czech Republic, on 20 February 2012. Walker played 34 games in his first season in the Extraliga, scoring four goals and five assists for nine points. He played a further two games with HC Olomouc, recording an assist.

As a result of his play in the Extraliga, Walker began to be noticed by the National Hockey League (NHL). In the NHL Central Scouting Bureau's January 2012 list of draft prospects, Walker was listed as the 21st best European-based skater for the 2012 NHL entry draft, the second highest Czech-based player on the list. Walker was listed as the 25th best European skater in the NHL's final list of prospects for the 2012 draft. He was not selected in the draft, but was invited to participate in the Washington Capitals development camp in July; however NHL rules required that Walker participate in the 2013 NHL entry draft before he was able to sign with any team.

=== North America ===
During the 2012–13 season, Walker appeared in twenty games with HC Vítkovice and recorded one assist; he was loaned to Hokej Šumperk 2003 for three games, where he also had one assist. After six years in the Czech Republic, Walker signed a contract on 8 January 2013 with the Youngstown Phantoms of the United States Hockey League, a junior ice hockey league in the United States. He made his debut for the team on 11 January against the Chicago Steel, recording a goal. After four games with the Phantoms, in which he recorded six points, Walker was named to the USHL/NHL Top Prospects Game on 23 January 2013; he replaced his teammate, who was ill. Walker played 29 games for the Phantoms during the regular season and recorded 27 points (7 goals, 20 assists). His 20 assists were good enough for fifth on the team, even though Walker only joined the team midway through the season. His season ended early due to an injury suffered in a game on 5 April where Walker broke a bone in his neck as a result of a hit from behind; as a result he missed all the Phantoms playoff games.

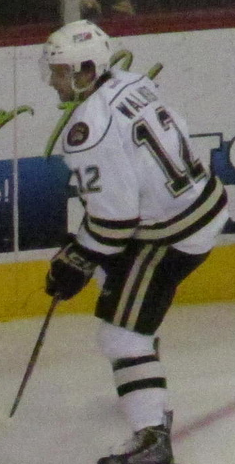
Walker playing with the Hershey Bears in 2013

Upon the conclusion of the season Walker returned to the Czech Republic to train, before heading back to Australia. In July he was invited to once again attend the Capitals development camp, scheduled for September. He performed well enough to remain with the team and attend their full training camp as one of 40 players. However, due to an overlooked rule, the Capitals were unable to sign Walker; as he had started the 2012–13 season in Europe and then moved to North America, and was under 20 years old, he would have to enter the 2014 NHL entry draft before being allowed to sign an NHL contract. Instead, on 24 September Walker signed a contract with the Capitals' American Hockey League affiliate, the Hershey Bears. He made his debut for the Bears on 5 October 2013 against the Adirondack Phantoms, becoming the first Australian to play in the AHL. During Walker's third game with the Bears, on October 27 against the Norfolk Admirals, he scored his first goal and recorded his first professional fight.

==== Washington Capitals ====
The 2014 NHL entry draft was the third and final NHL draft that Walker was eligible for, and he was selected in the third round, 89th overall, by the Capitals. In doing so, Walker became the first Australian to be selected in an NHL draft. On 25 July 2014, Walker was signed to a three-year entry-level contract with the Capitals. Partway through the 2014–2015 season Walker was reassigned to the South Carolina Stingrays of the ECHL. After a two-game stint with the Stingrays, where he recorded two points, Walker was brought back to Hershey. Reassigned to South Carolina again in January, Walker was injured in a game on 28 January when he tore his ACL, ending his season. At the time of the injury Walker had appeared in 28 games for the Bears, where he scored 4 points, and a further 6 games for the Stingrays, also recording 4 points. His production improved in 2015–16, as he finished with 17 goals and 41 points for the Bears. Walker was awarded the Bears' team awards for the Most Improved Player, Unsung Hero, and was also named the team's Man of the Year for his community involvement. He played 58 games for Hershey in 2016–17, recording 23 points and was re-signed by the Capitals to a two-year contract after the season finished.

Walker made the Capitals' opening night roster for the 2017–18 season, and made his NHL debut on 7 October, the Capitals' home opener against the Montreal Canadiens. Walker scored his first NHL goal that night; it was initially thought that the goal was scored by Devante Smith-Pelly, but upon further review, Smith-Pelly's shot had been deflected by Walker. His parents and brother flew in from Australia to witness his debut. On 30 November, Walker was put on waivers by the Capitals. The next day he was claimed by the Edmonton Oilers. On 19 December, the Oilers placed Walker on waivers, and was then re-claimed off waivers by the Capitals the day after. Walker made his playoff debut during Game six of the 2018 Stanley Cup playoffs against the Pittsburgh Penguins, becoming the first Australian to play and record a point in the NHL playoffs, assisting on a goal by Alex Chiasson. Walker would later go on to win the Stanley Cup with the Capitals, to become the first Welsh or Australian hockey player to win the Stanley Cup. However, Walker did not qualify to have his name on the trophy as he did not meet the games-played requirement.

==== St. Louis Blues ====
After six seasons within the Capitals organization, Walker left as a free agent to sign on a one-year, two-way contract with the St. Louis Blues on 1 July 2019. Walker again spent most of the season in the AHL (this time with the San Antonio Rampage), but also played in five NHL games, scoring his first goal as a Blue on 30 November against the Pittsburgh Penguins and an assist against the Chicago Blackhawks three days later. He was returned to the AHL on 12 December.

On 9 December 2021, Walker scored his first NHL hat trick in a 6–2 Blues victory over the Detroit Red Wings.

On 17th September 2025, Walker signed a two year contract extension with the St. Louis Blues worth $1.775 million dollars.

== International play ==
Medal record

Men's ice hockey

Representing Australia

World Championships
Gold medal – first place	2011 Melbourne	Division II Group A

Walker first played for the Australian senior team at the 2011 IIHF World Championship Division II Group A tournament which was held in Melbourne, Australia. Australia won the tournament and was promoted to Division I Group B for the 2012 World Championships. Walker finished the tournament with four goals and two assists for six points, tied for third overall. He was also recognised by the tournament coaches as the best player on the Australian team.

Walker represented Australia again at the 2012 World Championships. Playing in Division IB, Australia finished last in the group and was relegated to Division IIA for 2013. Walker scored two goals during the tournament.

== Personal life ==
Walker was born in Cardiff, Wales, to Wayne and Ceri; he also has an older brother, Ryan. When Walker was two, his family moved to Sydney, New South Wales, Australia where he started at Kirrawee High School. Wayne played rugby league, leading to Nathan playing for the Cronulla Sharks junior team until the age of 15. Ryan, his older brother, also played hockey representing Australia in the national under-18 squad. Ryan had to quit hockey after he was injured during a game in the United States. While in the Czech Republic, Walker learned to speak Czech, Slovak, and some Russian.

Walker first played ice hockey in Australia at the age of six, after watching his older brother Ryan play. Due to a lack of ice hockey broadcasting in Australia, Walker was also inspired after watching The Mighty Ducks film series and Mystery, Alaska, all of which are based around ice hockey. A trip to Toronto for a hockey tournament further helped develop his interest in the game, as both Walker and his brother visited the Hockey Hall of Fame and purchased DVDs of the sport.

== Career statistics ==
=== Regular season and playoffs ===
			Regular season					Playoffs
Season	Team	League	GP	G	A	Pts	PIM	GP	G	A	Pts	PIM
2007–08	HC Vítkovice Steel	CZE U18	1	0	0	0	2	—	—	—	—	—
2008–09	HC Vítkovice Steel	CZE U18	33	6	9	15	16	5	1	0	1	4
2009–10	HC Vítkovice Steel	CZE U18	28	22	20	42	47	2	2	2	4	4
2009–10	HC Vítkovice Steel	CZE U20	23	5	5	10	16	1	0	0	0	0
2010	Sydney Ice Dogs	AIHL	4	0	1	1	0	—	—	—	—	—
2010–11	HC Vítkovice Steel	CZE U18	10	4	10	14	22	—	—	—	—	—
2010–11	HC Vítkovice Steel	CZE U20	35	20	20	40	20	—	—	—	—	—
2011	Sydney Ice Dogs	AIHL	3	1	1	2	6	—	—	—	—	—
2011–12	HC Vítkovice Steel	CZE U18	—	—	—	—	—	3	4	1	5	14
2011–12	HC Vítkovice Steel	CZE U20	14	14	6	20	16	3	0	1	1	0
2011–12	HC Vítkovice Steel	ELH	34	4	5	9	8	1	0	0	0	2
2011–12	HC Olomouc	CZE.2	2	0	1	1	4	5	0	0	0	6
2012–13	HC Vítkovice Steel	CZE U20	13	12	12	24	42	—	—	—	—	—
2012–13	HC Vítkovice Steel	ELH	20	0	1	1	29	—	—	—	—	—
2012–13	Hokej Šumperk 2003	CZE.2	3	0	1	1	2	—	—	—	—	—
2012–13	Youngstown Phantoms	USHL	29	7	20	27	63	—	—	—	—	—
2013–14	Hershey Bears	AHL	43	5	6	11	40	—	—	—	—	—
2014–15	Hershey Bears	AHL	28	1	3	4	30	—	—	—	—	—
2014–15	South Carolina Stingrays	ECHL	6	2	2	4	0	—	—	—	—	—
2015–16	Hershey Bears	AHL	73	17	24	41	41	20	2	3	5	11
2016–17	Hershey Bears	AHL	58	11	12	23	33	12	2	4	6	0
2017–18	Hershey Bears	AHL	40	9	13	22	36	—	—	—	—	—
2017–18	Washington Capitals	NHL	7	1	0	1	4	1	0	1	1	0
2017–18	Edmonton Oilers	NHL	2	0	0	0	2	—	—	—	—	—
2018–19	Washington Capitals	NHL	3	0	1	1	2	—	—	—	—	—
2018–19	Hershey Bears	AHL	58	17	22	39	54	9	1	4	5	24
2019–20	San Antonio Rampage	AHL	46	19	13	32	29	—	—	—	—	—
2019–20	St. Louis Blues	NHL	5	1	1	2	4	—	—	—	—	—
2020–21	Utica Comets	AHL	4	2	0	2	6	—	—	—	—	—
2020–21	St. Louis Blues	NHL	8	1	0	1	2	—	—	—	—	—
2021–22	Springfield Thunderbirds	AHL	47	19	25	44	24	—	—	—	—	—
2021–22	St. Louis Blues	NHL	30	8	4	12	2	4	0	0	0	2
2022–23	St. Louis Blues	NHL	56	2	8	10	25	—	—	—	—	—
2023–24	Springfield Thunderbirds	AHL	30	13	16	29	24	—	—	—	—	—
2023–24	St. Louis Blues	NHL	45	7	6	13	18	—	—	—	—	—
2024–25	St. Louis Blues	NHL	73	8	8	16	63	7	3	1	4	22
2025–26	St. Louis Blues	NHL	46	4	7	11	28	—	—	—	—	—
NHL totals			275	32	35	67	150	12	3	2	5	24

=== International ===
Year	Team	Event	GP	G	A	Pts	PIM
2011	Australia	WC (Div II)	4	4	2	6	4
2012	Australia	WC (Div IB)	5	2	0	2	4
Senior totals			9	6	2	8	8
