= Vladimír Stránský =

Czech ice hockey player (1947–2026)

- Born: 7 June 1947 Jihlava, Czechoslovakia
- Died: 16 March 2026 (aged 78) Czech Republic
- Position: Left wing
- Shot: Left
- Played for: HC Vítkovice; HC Zlín
- Playing career: 1977–1982

Vladimír Stránský (7 June 1947 – 16 March 2026) was a Czech professional ice hockey player.

== Career ==
Between 1977 and 1981, Stránský played in the Czechoslovak First Ice Hockey League with both HC Vítkovice and HC Zlín.

Stránský won the national title with HC Vítkovice in 1981.

== Personal life and death ==
His sons Vít and Vladan also played ice hockey at a high level, the latter representing Australia after playing there for several years. Grandsons Matěj and Šimon Stránský (children of eldest son Darek) were a sixth round pick of the Dallas Stars in the 2011 NHL entry draft, and a Czech international respectively.

Stránský died on 16 March 2026, at the age of 78.
