= Daniel Adel =

American painter

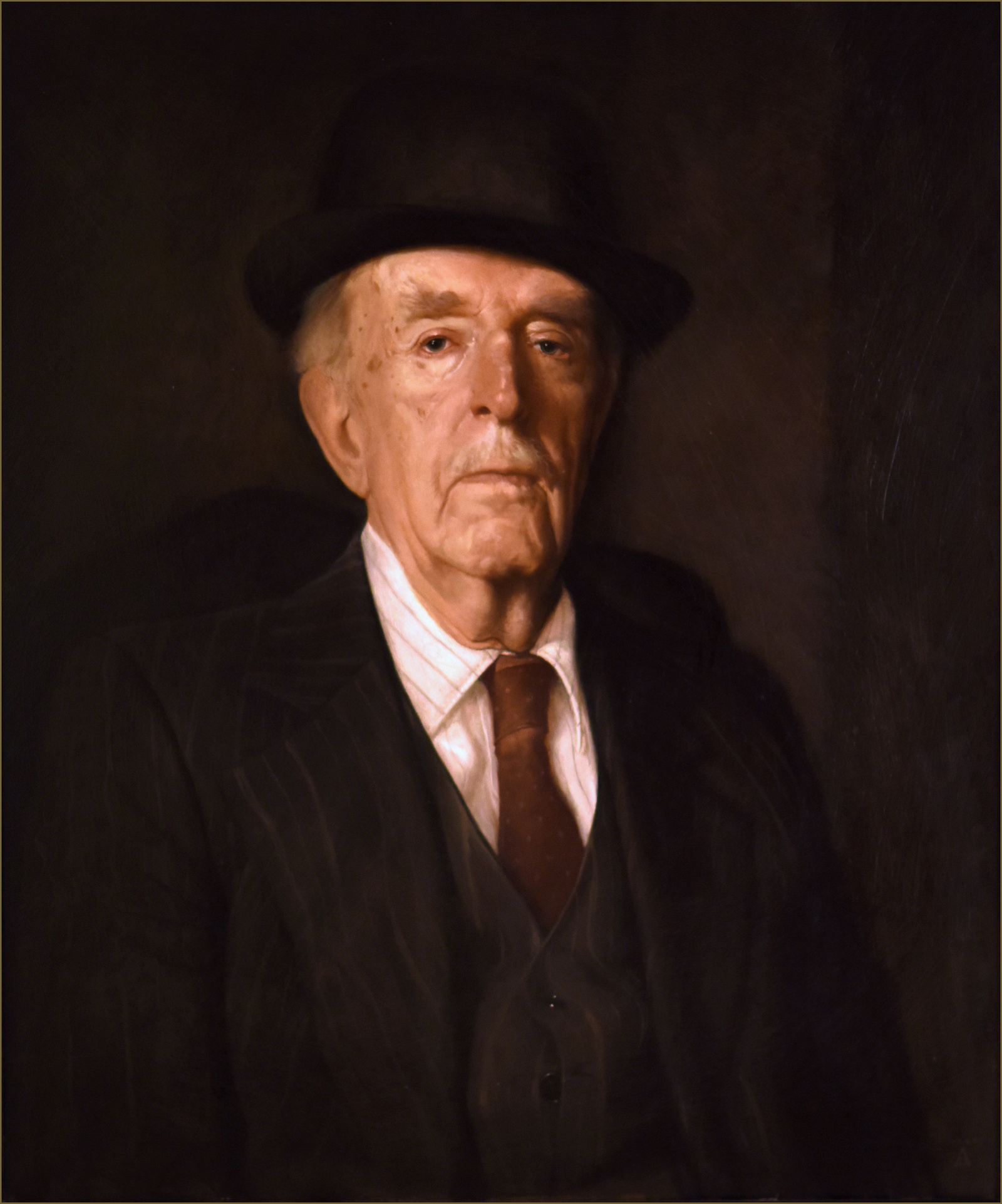
Henry Goode by Daniel Adel

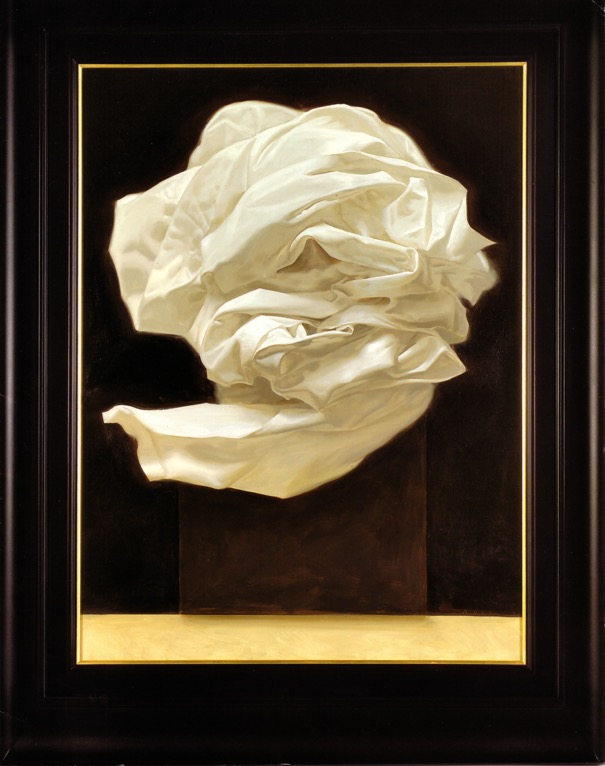
Cocoon by Daniel Adel

Daniel Adel (born 1962) has worked as a portraitist, illustrator and fine artist since 1984. His work has appeared in The New Yorker, Vanity Fair, and The New York Times, and on magazine covers including The New York Times Magazine, Newsweek, and Time, for whom he painted two covers in 2004. His cover portrait of George W. Bush for the Time Person of the Year issue in 2004 is part of the collection of Washington, D.C.'s National Portrait Gallery. His portrait of the former Speaker of the New York City Council, Gifford Miller, hangs in New York's City Hall. He has been commissioned to paint the Editors-in-Chief of Time, Der Spiegel, and Vanity Fair.

Adel has exhibited his work in New York City since completing his studies in art history at Dartmouth College. He has been represented by Arcadia Contemporary in New York City since 2001 and more recently by Avant Galleries, Samuel Owen Gallery and The Boston Art Group, where he exhibits his new series of hyperrealist abstract works, or "Hyperabstractions." These paintings feature gestural abstractions which are transformed into free-floating volumetric forms.

In 2011 Oceania Cruise Lines acquired a series of eight of his major works. He has received awards from the Salmagundi Club, was featured in the biennial exhibition of the National Academy of Design and was awarded three silver medals from the Society of Illustrators.

In 2001 several of Adel's portraits appeared in the Lincoln Center production of Ten Unknowns by Jon Robin Baitz, starring Donald Sutherland.

Adel has painted commissioned portraits for Yale University, Dartmouth College, Union Pacific Railroad, Notre Dame, the College of William and Mary, the New York Stock Exchange as well as for numerous private clients. In 2014 he painted the portrait of fashion designer Pierre Cardin.

He has been a featured speaker at the Corcoran Gallery, Savannah College of Art and Design and the Rhode Island School of Design and has taught at the School of Visual Arts and the Art Student's League in New York City. In addition to portraits, the artist also known for his paintings of crumpled paper or flowing fabric against in an undefined space.

He lives in the village of Lourmarin in Provence, France.
