= BabyBjörn =

Swedish baby products company

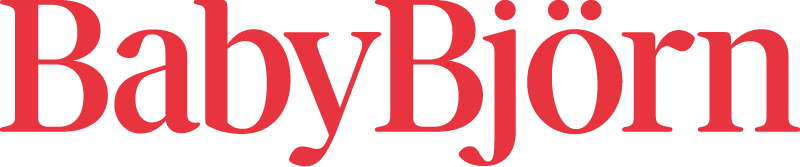
- Type: Private
- Industry: Baby products
- Founded: Stockholm, Sweden (1961)
- Founder: Björn Jakobson; Elsa Jakobson
- Headquarters: Sundbyberg, Sweden
- Key people: Björn Jakobson (Founder) and Lillemor Jakobson (Creative Designer)
- Number of employees: around 190
- Website: www.babybjorn.com

BabyBjörn is a Swedish family-owned company that develops, manufactures, and markets baby products, including baby carriers, baby bouncers, sleep products, bathroom products, kitchen products, and other baby essentials. Founded in 1961, the company focuses on ergonomic design and safety, and its products are often associated with Scandinavian minimalist design. The brand states that they emphasize long-term product development and functional, long-lasting design.

== History ==
BabyBjörn was established in 1961 by Björn Jakobson and his sister-in-law, Elsa Jakobson. The company launched its first product, the baby bouncer, in the same year.

In 1962, Björn Jakobson married textile designer Lillemor Jakobson, who later became the company’s creative designer and co-founder, playing a central role in shaping its product design and visual identity.

Björn and Lillemor Jakobson retained ownership and leadership of the company until the late 2010s, when it was transferred to the second generation.

According to company statements, an estimated 50 million babies have been carried in BabyBjörn baby carriers since the start.

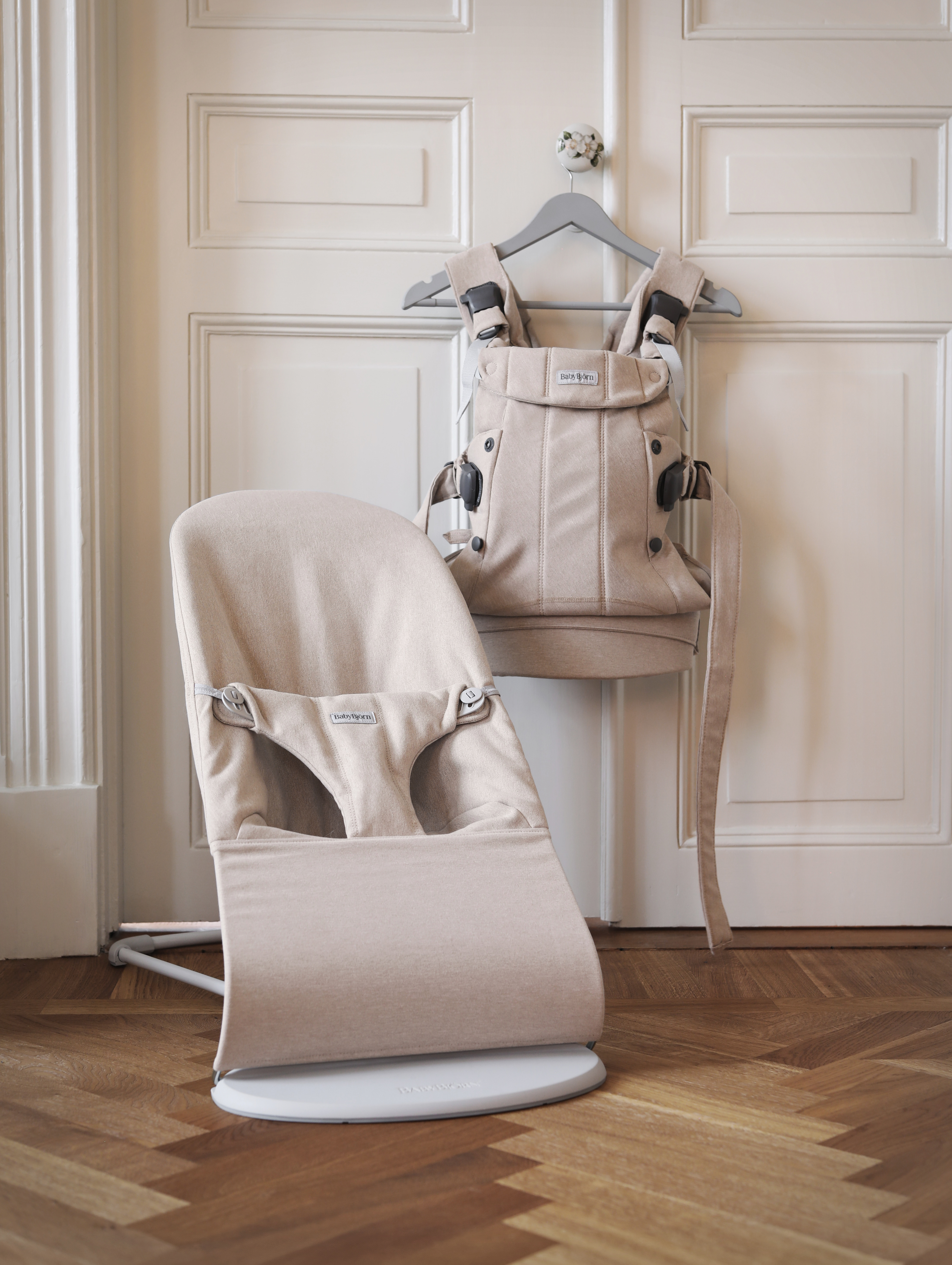

Today, Babybjörn's products are sold in over 50 countries.

=== Equality and shared parenting ===
BabyBjörn’s brand identity has been shaped by values commonly associated with Swedish family life, including safety, durability, and shared parenting. These values align with Sweden’s long-standing emphasis on gender equality, including its role as the first country in the world to introduce parental leave for both parents.

From the 1980s onward, BabyBjörn’s marketing materials increasingly featured fathers actively participating in childcare, an approach that was less common in international advertising at the time.

In more recent years, BabyBjörn-produced video content has circulated on social media in connection with the lattepappa (“latte dad”) phenomenon. This term is used to describe fathers on parental leave in Sweden who are actively involved in everyday childcare. Media discussions have linked this cultural trend to Sweden’s parental leave system and norms around shared parenting, often depicting fathers caring for their infants while going about daily activities using baby carriers.

=== Historical milestones ===
- 1961 – BabyBjörn sold its first baby bouncer in Sweden.
- 1963 – Björn Jakobson began consulting pediatricians and medical specialists as part of product development.
- 1968 – Björn and Lillemor Jakobson developed a washable baby bib.
- 1973 – BabyBjörn launched its first baby carrier, Close to Heart.
- 1991 – BabyBjörn introduced the Baby Carrier Original.
- 1994 – BabyBjörn introduced a black version of its baby carrier following consumer demand.
- 1999: The BabyBjörn Original baby carrier received the award for the Design of the Decade by the Industrial Designers Society of America (IDSA).
- 2013 – BabyBjörn launched the Baby Carrier One.
- 2019 – Björn and Lillemor Jakobson transferred ownership and leadership of the company to the next generation.
- 2021 – BabyBjörn launched Baby Carrier Harmony, a mesh baby carrier designed for newborns and toddlers.
- 2025 – Fredrik Olsson was appointed as CEO.

== Global Presence ==
BabyBjörn operates in more than 50 markets worldwide, with its largest markets including the United States, Japan, and South Korea. The company maintains offices in Sundbyberg (headquarters), Lanna (logistics center and warehouse), New York, Tokyo, Seoul, and Hong Kong.

== Products and Innovation ==
BabyBjörn’s first product was a baby bouncer, and the company's first baby carrier was made in 1973. The product range includes baby carriers, baby bouncers, sleep products, kitchen and bathroom products, and baby accessories. Baby carriers and baby bouncers remain the company’s core product categories today.

=== Product development and safety ===
BabyBjörn states that its products are developed with consideration for ergonomics and safety, and that product development includes consultation with pediatricians and other healthcare professionals to ensure proper support, comfort, and ergonomic safety for babies and their caregivers. The company has reported collaborations with doctors, midwives, and other safety experts as part of its product development and safety evaluation processes.

BabyBjörn has also participated in medical partnerships. The company has been listed as a funder of the Immediate Parent-Infant Skin-to-Skin Study (IPISTOSS), a multicenter clinical study led by Karolinska Institutet examining the effects of immediate skin-to-skin contact between preterm infants and their parents.

==== Hip-health ====
BabyBjörn is listed as a partner of the International Hip Dysplasia Institute (IHDI), which acknowledges all BabyBjörn baby carriers and bouncers as hip-healthy products. In 2025, BabyBjörn announced an expansion of its partnership with IHDI aimed at supporting families affected by hip dysplasia and increasing educational outreach.

==== Patents ====
Björn Jakobson is listed as the inventor on several Swedish patents related to baby carriers, including patent SE500164 (1991) and patent SE535534 (2011).

=== Design ===
Lillemor Jakobson played a central role in shaping BabyBjörn’s product design, packaging, and visual identity from the late 1970s onward. She introduced new colors and patterns, including the first black baby carrier, which marked a shift toward more neutral design options.

== Sustainability ==
BabyBjörn reports a focus on product durability, reuse, and supply-chain sustainability, including efforts to reduce environmental impact through material choices, packaging, and supplier audits.

According to BabyBjörn’s 2024 Annual Report, the company measures its greenhouse gas emissions and has set a target to reduce them by 50 percent by 2030, using 2022 as a baseline. The report states that BabyBjörn’s sustainability work is guided by international frameworks such as the United Nations Sustainable Development Goals and the Paris Agreement. BabyBjörn reported a reduction of approximately 30 percent in greenhouse gas emissions between 2022 and 2024.

== Awards & Recognition ==
BabyBjörn products have received several design awards. Some of these include the Design of the Decade Award from the Industrial Designers Society of America (IDSA) and multiple Red Dot Design Awards.

Björn Jakobson and Lillemor Jakobson have also received several honors for their contributions to Swedish business and design. These include Albert Bonniers pris till Årets företagare (Albert Bonnier Prize for Entrepreneur of the Year), Stora exportpriset (Great Export Prize), as well as Näringslivsmedaljen (Business and Industry Medal). The medal, awarded by the Royal Patriotic Society (Kungliga Patriotiska Sällskapet), is presented in recognition of "outstanding entrepreneurship".

In 2012 Björn was also awarded His Majesty The King’s Medal “for significant contributions to Swedish industry".
