= Ervin Moldován =

Romanian ice hockey player

- Born: February 5, 1978 (age 47); Miercurea Ciuc, Romania
- Height: 5 ft 10 in (178 cm)
- Weight: 176 lb (80 kg; 12 st 8 lb)
- Position: Left wing
- Shoots: Left
- MOL Liga team Former teams: HSC Csíkszereda; CS Sportul Studenţesc Bucharest
- National team: Romania
- NHL draft: Undrafted
- Playing career: 1998–present

Ervin Moldován (born February 5, 1978) is a Romanian ice hockey player who is currently playing for HSC Csíkszereda in the MOL Liga and the Romanian Hockey League.

Moldován has played for the Romania men's national ice hockey team at the 15 Ice Hockey World Championships. He also represented his country twice at the IIHF European U18 Championships.
