= Björn Jakobson =

Swedish entrepreneur

Björn Jakobson (born 14 August 1934 in Stockholm) is a Swedish entrepreneur.

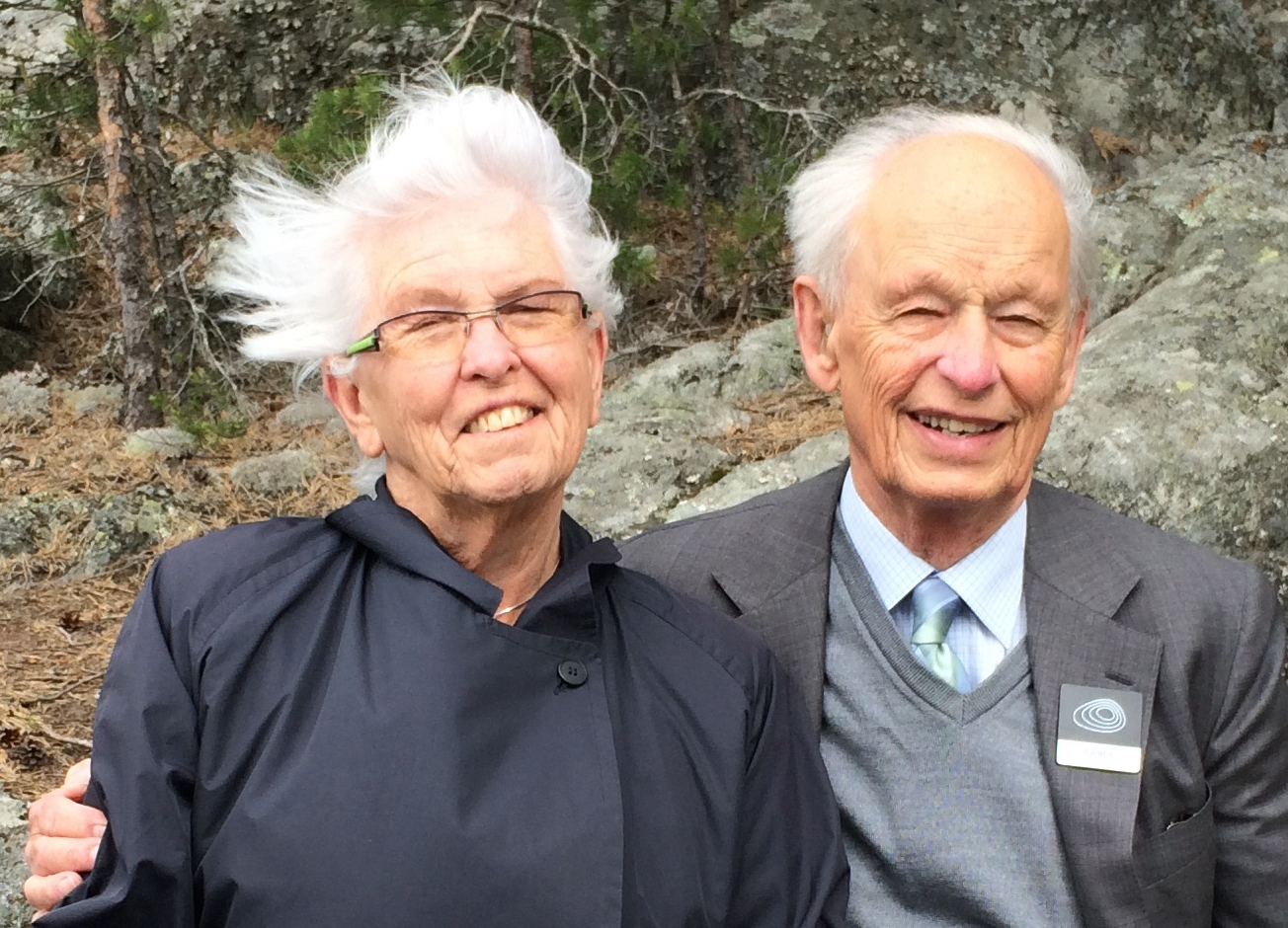
Lillemor and Björn Jakobson, sitting on a bench outside their museum Artipelag

In 1961, he started the company Babybjörn. The initial product was a bouncy chair that he acquired on a trip to the United States, He and his wife, the designer Lillemor Jakobson, are co-owners of Lillemor Design AB, the parent company of the group that includes Baby Björn.

In June 2012, the Jakobsons opened a new museum near Stockholm, on the island of Värmdö, called Artipelag.

In 2012 he was awarded His Majesty The King’s Medal “for significant contributions to Swedish industry”.
