= Puerto Rico national ice hockey team results =

This is a list of the Puerto Rico national ice hockey team results from 2021 to the present day.

- Challenger Series Heritage Cup - a league formed by hockey associations representing Puerto Rico, Jamaica and Lebanon.

== All-time record against other national teams ==
Last match update: July 12, 2026

Key
Positive balance (more wins)
Neutral balance (wins = losses)
Negative balance (more losses)

Team	GP	W	T	L	GF	GA
Andorra	1	1	0	0	15	1
Argentina	10	3	1	6	34	50
Brazil	3	3	0	0	36	3
Colombia	6	5	0	1	27	11
Egypt	1	0	0	1	1	5
Greece	1	1	0	0	11	1
Jamaica	11	5	0	6	49	62
Lebanon	9	3	0	6	36	49
Liechtenstein	1	1	0	0	5	2
Portugal	1	1	0	0	2	1
Venezuela	1	1	0	0	5	1
Total	45	24	1	20	221	186

=== Record by Club ===
Last match update: July 12, 2026
Only years: 2024-2026 included.

Team	GP	W	T	L	GF	GA
Armenia HC	4	4	0	0	20	7
(Greece) Greek Heritage Team	4	0	0	4	11	23
Mexico Warriors	3	2	0	1	16	13
Central American Team	1	0	0	1	1	4
Total	12	6	0	6	48	47

== 2021 ==
Against other national teams
Opponent	Date	Score	Scores by period	Tournament	Host venue
Argentina	October 14, 2021	5–3	No information	Amerigol LATAM Cup	Florida Panthers IceDen, Coral Springs, Florida
Jamaica (Friendly)	October 15, 2021	2–10	No information	Amerigol LATAM Cup	Florida Panthers IceDen, Coral Springs, Florida
Colombia	October 17, 2021	1–5	No information	Amerigol LATAM Cup	Florida Panthers IceDen, Coral Springs, Florida
Against club and other teams
Opponent	Date	Score	Scores by period	Tournament	Host venue
Win Loss Tie

== 2022 ==
Against other national teams
Opponent	Date	Score	Scores by period	Tournament	Host venue
Colombia	March 24, 2022	2–0	No information	Amerigol LATAM Cup (Spring Classic)	Dallas, Texas
Brazil	March 25, 2022	9–2	No information	Amerigol LATAM Cup (Spring Classic)	Dallas, Texas
Argentina	March 25, 2022	2–4	No information	Amerigol LATAM Cup (Spring Classic)	Dallas, Texas
Venezuela	March 26, 2022	5–1	No information	Amerigol LATAM Cup (Spring Classic)	Dallas, Texas
Colombia	March 26, 2022	2–0	No information	Amerigol LATAM Cup (Spring Classic)	Dallas, Texas
Argentina	March 27, 2022	3–6	No information	Amerigol LATAM Cup (Spring Classic)	Dallas, Texas
Brazil	September 15, 2022	8–1	No information	Amerigol LATAM Cup	Florida Panthers IceDen, Coral Springs, Florida
Argentina	September 15, 2022	3–5	No information	Amerigol LATAM Cup	Florida Panthers IceDen, Coral Springs, Florida
Colombia	September 16, 2022	6–3	No information	Amerigol LATAM Cup	Florida Panthers IceDen, Coral Springs, Florida
Argentina	September 18, 2022	4–3	No information	Amerigol LATAM Cup	Florida Panthers IceDen, Coral Springs, Florida
Against club and other teams
Opponent	Date	Score	Scores by period	Tournament	Host venue
Win Loss Tie

== 2023 ==
Against other national teams
Opponent	Date	Score	Scores by period	Tournament	Host venue
Jamaica	June 8, 2023	2–8	No information	Fiesta de Hockey	World Ice Arena , New York, New York
Jamaica	June 9, 2023	6–0	No information	Fiesta de Hockey	World Ice Arena , New York, New York
Jamaica	June 10, 2023	6–5 OT	No information	Fiesta de Hockey	World Ice Arena , New York, New York
Against club and other teams
Opponent	Date	Score	Scores by period	Tournament	Host venue
Win Loss Tie

== 2024 ==
Against other national teams
Opponent	Date	Score	Scores by period	Tournament	Host venue
Lebanon	April 19, 2024	3–2	No information	Challenger Series	Fifth Third Arena, Chicago, Illinois
Jamaica	April 19, 2024	3–6	No information	Challenger Series	Fifth Third Arena, Chicago, Illinois
Lebanon	April 20, 2024	4–3	No information	Challenger Series	Fifth Third Arena, Chicago, Illinois
Jamaica	April 21, 2024	4–5	No information	Challenger Series	Fifth Third Arena, Chicago, Illinois
Lebanon	June 6, 2024	2–5	No information	Challenger Series	Clark Gillies Arena, Dix Hills, New York
Jamaica	June 7, 2024	2–11	No information	Challenger Series	Clark Gillies Arena, Dix Hills, New York
Lebanon	June 8, 2024	3–6	No information	Challenger Series	Clark Gillies Arena, Dix Hills, New York
Jamaica	June 8, 2024	7–5	No information	Challenger Series	Clark Gillies Arena, Dix Hills, New York
Lebanon	July 12, 2024	3–9	No information	Challenger Series	Campus Ice Centre, Oshawa, Canada
Argentina	August 21, 2024	1–8	No information	Amerigol LATAM Cup	Florida Panthers IceDen, Coral Springs, Florida
Colombia	August 22, 2024	5–3	No information	Amerigol LATAM Cup	Florida Panthers IceDen, Coral Springs, Florida
Against club and other teams
Opponent	Date	Score	Scores by period	Tournament	Host venue
Mexico Warriors	August 23, 2024	3–6	No information	Amerigol LATAM Cup	Florida Panthers IceDen, Coral Springs, Florida
Armenia HC	August 24, 2024	7–3	No information	Amerigol LATAM Cup – 5th place game	Baptist Health IcePlex, Fort Lauderdale, Florida
Win Loss Tie

== 2025 ==
Against other national teams
Opponent	Date	Score	Scores by period	Tournament	Host venue
Argentina	March 19, 2025	5–7	No information	Amerigol LATAM Spring Classic	America First Center, Henderson, Nevada
Colombia	March 20, 2025	11–0	No information	Amerigol LATAM Spring Classic	America First Center, Henderson, Nevada
Argentina	March 21, 2025	6–4	No information	Amerigol LATAM Spring Classic – Semi-finals	America First Center, Henderson, Nevada
Andorra	April 22, 2025	15–1	No information	IIHF Development Cup	Palau de Gel, Canillo, Andorra
Liechtenstein	April 23, 2025	5–2	No information	IIHF Development Cup	Palau de Gel, Canillo, Andorra
Greece	April 24, 2025	11–1	No information	IIHF Development Cup	Palau de Gel, Canillo, Andorra
Portugal	April 25, 2025	2–1; OT	No information	IIHF Development Cup	Palau de Gel, Canillo, Andorra
Brazil	April 26, 2025	19–0	No information	IIHF Development Cup	Palau de Gel, Canillo, Andorra
Lebanon	May 9, 2025	5–6; SO	No information	Challenger Series	Fifth Third Arena, Chicago, Illinois
Jamaica	May 11, 2025	7–3	No information	Challenger Series	Fifth Third Arena, Chicago, Illinois
Egypt	May 30, 2025	1–5	1–1, 0–2, 0–2	Dream Nations Cup	The Rink at American Dream, East Rutherford, New Jersey
Lebanon	July 10, 2025	7–9	No information	Challenger Series	Montreal, Canada
Jamaica	July 11, 2025	5–9	No information	Challenger Series	Montreal, Canada
Argentina	August 21, 2025	4–4	1–3, 1–1, 2–0	Amerigol LATAM Cup – Division 1	Florida Panthers IceDen, Coral Springs, Florida
Argentina	August 23, 2025	1–6	0–2, 1–2, 0–2	Amerigol LATAM Cup – Division 1	Florida Panthers IceDen, Coral Springs, Florida
Against club and other teams
Opponent	Date	Score	Scores by period	Tournament	Host venue
Mexico Warriors	March 19, 2025	6–5; OT	No information	Amerigol LATAM Spring Classic	America First Center, Henderson, Nevada
Mexico Warriors	March 22, 2025	7–2	No information	Amerigol LATAM Spring Classic – Final	America First Center, Henderson, Nevada
(Greece) Greek Heritage Team	May 10, 2025	4–5; OT	No information	Challenger Series	Fifth Third Arena, Chicago, Illinois
Central America	May 28, 2025	1–4	1–0, 0–3, 0–1	Dream Nations Cup	The Rink at American Dream, East Rutherford, New Jersey
Armenia HC	May 29, 2025	4–2	1–1, 1–1, 2–0	Dream Nations Cup	The Rink at American Dream, East Rutherford, New Jersey
Armenia HC	August 20, 2025	3–1	1–0, 1–0, 1–1	Amerigol LATAM Cup – Division 1	Florida Panthers IceDen, Coral Springs, Florida
(Greece) Greek Heritage Team	August 22, 2025	1–4	0–0, 0–3, 1–1	Amerigol LATAM Cup – Division 1	Florida Panthers IceDen, Coral Springs, Florida
Armenia HC	August 23, 2025	6–1	0–1, 2–0, 4–0	Amerigol LATAM Cup – Division 1	Florida Panthers IceDen, Coral Springs, Florida
Win Loss Tie

== 2026 ==
Against other national teams
Opponent	Date	Score	Scores by period	Tournament	Host venue
Jamaica	May 8, 2026	6–2	1–0, 5–0, 0–2	Challenger Series	Fifth Third Arena, Chicago, Illinois
Lebanon	May 10, 2026	5–4; OT	2–1, 0–2, 2–1, 1–0	Challenger Series	Fifth Third Arena, Chicago, Illinois
Lebanon	July 9, 2026	4–5; OT	No information	Challenger Series	Sportplexe Pierrefonds, Quebec
Jamaica	July 10, 2026	4–7	No information	Challenger Series	Sportplexe Pierrefonds, Quebec
Against club and other teams
Opponent	Date	Score	Scores by period	Tournament	Host venue
(Greece) Greek Heritage Team	May 9, 2026	5–8	0–1, 1–4, 4–3	Challenger Series	Fifth Third Arena, Chicago, Illinois
(Greece) Greek Heritage Team	July 11, 2026	1–5	No information	Challenger Series	Sportplexe Pierrefonds, Quebec
Win Loss Tie
