= Ice hockey in Mexico =

- Country: Mexico
- Governing body: Federación Deportiva de México de Hockey sobre Hielo
- National teams: Men's national team; Women's national team
- First played: 1960s

National competitions
- Liga Mexicana Élite

International competitions
- IIHF World Championships; Winter Olympics; Pan American Tournament

Ice hockey is a minor sport in Mexico, but is slowly growing. Football has dominated Mexican sports for decades, but ice hockey has grown in popularity in Mexico since the 1960s.

Women's ice hockey is also growing in Mexico.

== History ==
The game of ice hockey was played in the country for the first time in the 1960s, however, the Mexican Federation of Winter Sports (Spanish: Federación Mexicana de Deportes Invernales A.C.) was not founded until 1984. Mexico joined the International Ice Hockey Federation (IIHF) on 30 April 1985. It is the third North American nation after Canada and the United States to join the IIHF.

=== Domestic league ===
The Mexican Elite Hockey League Liga Mexicana Élite de Hockey is a semi-professional ice hockey league in Mexico and was inaugurated as the Mexican Elite League (Spanish: Liga Mexicana Élite) on 2 October 2010, with the goal to establishing Mexico's high-level international competitor in ice hockey. Currently, the league has six teams.

=== National teams ===
The men's national team played its first game on 10 April 2000 during the 2000 World Championship Pool D tournament in Reykjavík, Iceland, losing to Belgium 5–0. It is the only Latin American team that competes in the IIHF tournaments.

The women's national team played its first game on 18 February 2012 against Argentina in an exhibition game in Cuautitlán Izcalli, losing to them 1–0. The following day, they played the Argentinians again, this time winning by a score of 7–1. The women's national team did not compete in any Women's World Championship tournaments until 2014 when they played in Division II Group B Qualification tournament. They won all three of their games and earned a promotion to Division II Group B for 2015.

The junior national team played its first game on 30 December 1996 during the 1997 World Junior Championship Pool D tournament in Sofia, Bulgaria, in a 13–1 loss to Spain.

Mexico City hosted the Pan American Tournament from 2014 to 2017. The men's national team was the runners-up three times until 2017, they won their first ever Pan American Tournament by defeating Colombia 1–0 in the final, however, their opposition is currently not a member of the IIHF due to lack of governing bodies of ice hockey in Colombia.

=== Olympic games ===
On 15 January 2020, Luisa Wilson became the first Mexican to win an Olympic medal in any Winter Olympics sport when her team won the gold medal at the girls' 3x3 mixed tournament, during the 2020 Winter Youth Olympics in Lausanne, Switzerland.
