= Pan American Ice Hockey Tournament =

International national team ice hockey tournament

- Sport: Ice hockey
- Founded: 2014
- Folded: 2017
- No. of teams: 9 – Men's; 5 – Women's
- Last champions: Mexico (1st title) – Men's; Mexico (3rd title) – Women's
- Most titles: Colombia (2 titles) – Men's; Mexico (3 titles) – Women's

The Pan American Ice Hockey Tournament (French: Tournois panaméricain de hockey sur glace, Spanish: Torneo Panamericano de Hockey sobre Hielo) was a series of the international ice hockey tournament held from 2014 through 2017 in North and South America. The full members of the International Ice Hockey Federation (IIHF) were Canada, Mexico and the United States, which participated in the IIHF World Championship. The associate members were Argentina and Brazil, which participate in the IIHF Inline Hockey World Championship. Jamaica was also an IIHF member, but was not quoted as a potential participant. Several countries had not registered any ice hockey activities; Chile, Ecuador and Venezuela, had only played inline hockey.

== History ==
The first edition took place in Mexico City from 2 to 9 March 2014. The Canada Selects won the men's tournament after defeating Mexico in the final, and Colombia finished in third place. Canada "A" squad (the Sudbury Lady Wolves) won the women's tournament, with Mexico finishing second, and Canada "B" squad, made up of players from several teams in Ontario, finishing third.

The second edition also took place in Mexico City from 3 to 7 June 2015. Brazil, Colombia, two Argentine teams and two Mexican teams played in the men's tournament. Argentina, Colombia, two Mexican teams and a team featuring Brazilian and Mexican players played in the women's tournament. This time, Canada was not invited. Chile, Ecuador, Morocco, the United States and Venezuela were said to be invited, but it didn't attend to call.

The third edition took place in Mexico City from 6 to 12 June 2016. Colombia won the men's tournament after defeating Mexico. Mexico finished second for the third time in three tournaments. Mexico "A" won the women's tournament after defeating Argentina.

The fourth and final edition took place in Mexico City from 5 to 11 June 2017, with two Argentine teams, two Brazilian teams, two Colombian teams, two Mexican teams, and for the first time, Chile, in the men's tournament. In the women's tournament were Argentina, Colombia, two Mexican teams, and for the first time, a new women's team, Brazil.

== Results ==
=== Men's ===
Year	(gold) Gold	(silver) Silver	(bronze) Bronze	Host city	Host country
2014	Canada Selects (1)	Mexico (1)	Colombia (1)	Mexico City	Mexico
2015	Colombia (1)	Mexico (2)	Brazil (1)	Mexico City	Mexico
2016	Colombia (2)	Mexico "A" (3)	Mexico "B" (1)	Mexico City	Mexico
2017	Mexico "A" (1)	Colombia (1)	Argentina "A" (1)	Mexico City	Mexico

=== Women's ===
Year	(gold) Gold	(silver) Silver	(bronze) Bronze	Host city	Host country
2014	Canada "A" (1)	Mexico (1)	Canada "B" (1)	Mexico City	Mexico
2015	Mexico (1)	Colombia (1)	Mexico U18 (1)	Mexico City	Mexico
2016	Mexico "A" (2)	Argentina (1)	Mexico "B" (1)	Mexico City	Mexico
2017	Mexico "A" (3)	Colombia (2)	Argentina (1)	Mexico City	Mexico

== Medal table ==
=== Men's ===
Rank	Country	(gold) Gold	(silver) Silver	(bronze) Bronze	Total
1	Colombia	2	1	1	4
2	Mexico	1	3	1	5
3	Canada	1	0	0	1
4	Argentina	0	0	1	1
4	Brazil	0	0	1	1
Totals (5 countries)		4	4	4	12

=== Women's ===
Rank	Country	(gold) Gold	(silver) Silver	(bronze) Bronze	Total
1	Mexico	3	1	2	6
2	Canada	1	0	1	2
3	Colombia	0	2	0	2
4	Argentina	0	1	1	2
Totals (4 countries)		4	4	4	12
