= 2016 Pan American Ice Hockey Tournament =

Tournament details
- Host country: Mexico
- Venue: 1 (in 1 host city)
- Dates: 6–12 June
- Teams: 6

Final positions
- Champions: Colombia
- Runners-up: Mexico
- Third place: Mexico

Tournament statistics
- Games played: 15
- Goals scored: 132 (8.8 per game)

The 2016 Pan American Ice Hockey Tournament was the third edition of the Pan American Ice Hockey Tournament, an annual event run by the Federación Deportiva de México de Hockey sobre Hielo, sanctioned by International Ice Hockey Federation. It took place in Mexico City, Mexico between June 6 and 12, 2016.

== Participants ==
The following teams will compete in the competition, with both Mexico and Argentina bringing both an A team, and a B team.

North America

- Mexico (host)
- Mexico "B"

South America

- Argentina
- Argentina "B"
- Brazil
- Colombia

== Round-robin ==
=== Standings ===
Pos	Team	Pld	W	OTW	OTL	L	GF	GA	GD	Pts	Qualification
1	Mexico	5	5	0	0	0	42	4	+38	15	Advance to final round (gold-medal game)
2	Colombia	5	4	0	0	1	37	9	+28	12	Advance to final round (gold-medal game)
3	Mexico "B"	5	3	0	0	2	23	11	+12	9	Advance to final round (bronze-medal game)
4	Brazil	5	2	0	0	3	13	22	−9	6	Advance to final round (bronze-medal game)
5	Argentina	5	1	0	0	4	14	23	−9	3	Did not advance (Finish 5th and 6th place)
6	Argentina "B"	5	0	0	0	5	3	63	−60	0	Did not advance (Finish 5th and 6th place)

=== Schedules ===
(UTC–06:00)

June 6, 2016; 11:00	Argentina "B"	1–8	Brazil	Icedome, Mexico City

June 6, 2016; 21:45	Mexico "B"	4–1	Argentina	Icedome, Mexico City

June 6, 2016; 23:15	Colombia	2–6	Mexico	Icedome, Mexico City

June 7, 2016; 10:30	Colombia	3–1	Argentina	Icedome, Mexico City

June 7, 2016; 22:00	Mexico	4–0	Brazil	Icedome, Mexico City

June 8, 2016; 10:30	Mexico "B"	10–0	Argentina "B"	Icedome, Mexico City

June 8, 2016; 21:45	Argentina	1–10	Mexico	Icedome, Mexico City

June 9, 2016; 10:30	Colombia	17–0	Argentina "B"	Icedome, Mexico City

June 9, 2016; 22:00	Brazil	0–7	Mexico "B"	Icedome, Mexico City

June 10, 2016; 10:30	Argentina	1–4	Brazil	Icedome, Mexico City

June 10, 2016; 20:45	Argentina "B"	0–18	Mexico	Icedome, Mexico City

June 10, 2016; 22:15	Mexico "B"	1–6	Colombia	Icedome, Mexico City

June 11, 2016; 18:45	Argentina "B"	2–10	Argentina	Icedome, Mexico City

June 11, 2016; 21:15	Brazil	1–9	Colombia	Icedome, Mexico City

June 11, 2016; 22:45	Mexico	4–1	Mexico "B"	Icedome, Mexico City

== Final round ==
=== Bronze medal game ===
(UTC–06:00)

June 12, 2016; 17:30	Mexico "B"	2–0	Brazil	Icedome, Mexico City

=== Gold medal game ===
(UTC–06:00)

June 12, 2016; 19:00	Mexico	2 – 3 GWS (Regulation: 2–2) (SO: 1–2)	Colombia	Icedome, Mexico City

=== Final standings ===
Rk	Team
1st place, gold medalist(s)	Colombia
2nd place, silver medalist(s)	Mexico
3rd place, bronze medalist(s)	Mexico "B"
4	Brazil
5	Argentina
6	Argentina "B"
