= 2015 Pan American Ice Hockey Tournament =

Tournament details
- Host country: Mexico
- Venue: 1 (in 1 host city)
- Dates: 3–7 June
- Teams: 6

Final positions
- Champions: Colombia (1st title)
- Runners-up: Mexico
- Third place: Brazil

Tournament statistics
- Games played: 15
- Goals scored: 111 (7.4 per game)
- Scoring leader: (Mexico) Brian Arroyo (21 points)

The 2015 Pan American Ice Hockey Tournament was the second edition of the Pan American Ice Hockey Tournament, an annual event run by the Federación Deportiva de México de Hockey sobre Hielo, sanctioned by International Ice Hockey Federation. It took place in Mexico City, Mexico between June 3 and 7, 2015.

== Participants ==
North America

- Mexico (host)
- Mexico U17

South America

- Argentina
- Argentina "B"
- Brazil
- Colombia

== Schedules ==
(UTC–06:00)

June 3, 2015; 11:00	Argentina	0 – 8	Colombia	Icedome, Mexico City

Game reference

June 3, 2015; 14:30	Brazil	5 – 2	Mexico U17	Icedome, Mexico City

Game reference

June 3, 2015; 21:45	Argentina "B"	0 – 19	Mexico	Icedome, Mexico City

Game reference

June 4, 2015; 9:30	Brazil	7 – 0	Argentina "B"	Icedome, Mexico City

Game reference

June 4, 2015; 21:00	Argentina	1 – 9	Mexico	Icedome, Mexico City

Game reference

June 4, 2015; 22:30	Mexico U17	0 – 6	Colombia	Icedome, Mexico City

Game reference

June 5, 2015; 10:30	Argentina "B"	1 – 2	Argentina	Icedome, Mexico City

Game reference

June 5, 2015; 19:15	Colombia	3 – 0	Brazil	Icedome, Mexico City

Game reference

June 5, 2015; 22:15	Mexico U17	0 – 8	Mexico	Icedome, Mexico City

Game reference

June 6, 2015; 16:00	Argentina	0 – 1	Mexico U17	Icedome, Mexico City

Game reference

June 6, 2015; 17:45	Brazil	1 – 11	Mexico	Icedome, Mexico City

Game reference

June 6, 2015; 19:15	Colombia	12 – 0	Argentina "B"	Icedome, Mexico City

Game reference

June 7, 2015; 10:30	Brazil	6 – 1	Argentina	Icedome, Mexico City

Game reference

June 7, 2015; 13:30	Argentina "B"	0 – 1	Mexico U17	Icedome, Mexico City

Game reference

June 7, 2015; 16:30	Colombia	4 – 3 (SO)	Mexico	Icedome, Mexico City

Game reference

== Standings ==
Pos	Team	Pld	W	OTW	OTL	L	GF	GA	GD	Pts
1	Colombia	5	4	1	0	0	33	3	+30	14
2	Mexico	5	4	0	1	0	50	6	+44	13
3	Brazil	5	3	0	0	2	19	17	+2	9
4	Mexico U17	5	2	0	0	3	4	19	−15	6
5	Argentina	5	1	0	0	4	4	25	−21	3
6	Argentina "B"	5	0	0	0	5	1	41	−40	0
