= Haiti men's national ice hockey team =

Haiti

First international
- Lebanon 7–4 Haiti (Saint-Laurent, Canada; 23 April 2017)

Biggest defeat
- Lebanon 7–4 Haiti (Saint-Laurent, Canada; 23 April 2017)

International record (W–L–T)
- 0–1–0

The Haiti national ice hockey team (French: Équipe d'Haïti de hockey sur glace) is the national men's ice hockey team of Haiti. Made up exclusively of Haitians living in Canada, the Haitian team is an unofficial national team outside the IIHF and has so far played in only one international game.

== History ==
Haiti played a friendly match against Lebanon on 23 April 2017 in Saint-Laurent, a borough of Montreal, Quebec, Canada, with both teams making their international debut. The Haitian team was defeated by the Lebanese team, 7–4. Former NHL player Georges Laraque, whose parents were born in Haiti, played for the Haitian team, among others. The Haitian team was coached by a Canadian former minor-league player Robert Haddock. While Haiti maintains a ball hockey national team that has played at the Ball Hockey World Championship, there is currently no governing body for ice hockey in the country.

=== Haitian-born players overseas ===
Most notable players of Haitian-origin have played in Canada. Claude Vilgrain played in 89 games for five seasons in the NHL with the Vancouver Canucks, New Jersey Devils and Philadelphia Flyers, Maxime Boisclair played in 176 games for eight seasons in the Quebec-based minor league, Ligue Nord-Américaine de Hockey, and Zack Stringer (2003) formerly of the Regina Pats in the Canadian major junior league, Western Hockey League. Stringer now plays for the Brock Badgers in the OUA. Vilgrain additionally represented Canada at the 1988 Winter Olympics in Calgary. André Mattsson, also of Haitian-origin, played for 13 seasons in several Swedish leagues (Elitserien, HockeyAllsvenskan and Division 2). Vilgrain, Boisclair and Mattsson were all born in Port-au-Prince. Stringer was born in Mirebalais and adopted by a Canadian couple and raised in Lethbridge, Alberta.

== All-time record ==
Last match update: 23 April 2017

Team	GP	W	T	L	GF	GA
Lebanon	1	0	0	1	4	7
Total	1	0	0	1	4	7
