= List of Brazilian records in speed skating =

The following are the national records in speed skating in Brazil maintained by the Brazilian Ice Sports Federation (CBGD).

== Men ==
Event	Record	Athlete	Date	Meet	Place	Ref
500 meters	37.03	João Victor da Silva	22 October 2021	AmCup #1	Salt Lake City, United States	
500 meters × 2						
1000 meters	1:13.58	Marcelo Donadio	24 February 2018	Frillensee Cup	Inzell, Germany	
1500 meters	1:54.70	Marcelo Donadio	18 December 2016		Inzell, Germany	
3000 meters	4:11.19	Éder Moraes	26 November 2022	Time Trials	Salt Lake City, United States	
5000 meters	6:59.66	Éder Moraes	31 August 2024	Desert Classic	Salt Lake City, United States	
10000 meters	14:34.35	Éder Moraes	22 October 2022	AmCup	Salt Lake City, United States	
Team pursuit (8 laps)						
Sprint combination						
Small combination						
Big combination						

== Women ==
Event	Record	Athlete	Date	Meet	Place	Ref
500 meters	41.03	Julia de Vos	25 October 2025	Fall World Cup Qualifier	Salt Lake City, United States	
500 meters × 2						
1000 meters	1:21.08	Larissa Paes	7 November 2025	Beehive Burn	Salt Lake City, United States	
1500 meters	2:05.93	Larissa Paes	25 October 2025	Fall World Cup Qualifier	Salt Lake City, United States	
3000 meters	4:37.14	Larissa Paes	20 October 2022	AmCup	Salt Lake City, United States	
5000 meters						
10000 meters						
Team pursuit (6 laps)						
Sprint combination						
Mini combination						
Small combination						
