= 2014 Pan American Ice Hockey Tournament =

Tournament details
- Host country: Mexico
- Venue: 1 (in 1 host city)
- Dates: 2–9 March
- Teams: 5

Final positions
- Champions: Canada
- Runners-up: Mexico
- Third place: Colombia

Tournament statistics
- Games played: 12
- Goals scored: 153 (12.75 per game)
- Scoring leader: (Mexico) Carlos Gomez (21 points)

The 2014 Pan American Ice Hockey Tournament was the first Pan American Ice Hockey Tournament, an annual event run by the Federación Deportiva de México de Hockey sobre Hielo. It took place in Mexico City, Mexico between March 2 and March 9, 2014. Canada won the tournament, winning all five of its game and defeating Mexico in the gold-medal game. Colombia finished third place after defeating Argentina in the bronze-medal game.

== Participants ==
North America

- Canada
- Mexico (host)

South America

- Argentina
- Brazil
- Colombia

== Round-robin ==
=== Standings ===
Pos	Team	Pld	W	OTW	OTL	L	GF	GA	GD	Pts	Qualification
1	Canada	4	4	0	0	0	49	6	+43	12	Advance to final round (gold-medal game)
2	Mexico	4	3	0	0	1	48	8	+40	9	Advance to final round (gold-medal game)
3	Colombia	4	2	0	0	2	30	21	+9	6	Advance to final round (bronze-medal game)
4	Argentina	4	1	0	0	3	6	50	−44	3	Advance to final round (bronze-medal game)
5	Brazil	4	0	0	0	4	3	51	−48	0	5th place

=== Schedules ===
(UTC–06:00)

March 2, 2014; 16:00	Argentina	1 – 11 (1–3, 0–1, 0–7)	Colombia	Icedome, Mexico City

Game reference

March 2, 2014; 18:30	Mexico	16 – 0 (8–0, 1–0, 7–0)	Brazil	Icedome, Mexico City

Game reference

March 3, 2014; 17:00	Canada	9 – 3 (3–1, 3–1, 3–1)	Colombia	Icedome, Mexico City

Game reference

March 4, 2014; 19:30	Argentina	0 – 18 (0–10, 0–1, 0–7)	Canada	Icedome, Mexico City

Game reference

March 5, 2014; 13:30	Brazil	3 – 5 (0–0, 0–3, 3–2)	Argentina	Icedome, Mexico City

Game reference

March 5, 2014; 19:30	Mexico	3 – 6 (0–3, 3–2, 0–1)	Canada	Icedome, Mexico City

Game reference

March 6, 2014; 19:30	Brazil	0 – 16 (0–9, 0–2, 0–5)	Canada	Icedome, Mexico City

Game reference

March 7, 2014; 20:30	Mexico	11 – 2 (4–0, 6–2, 1–0)	Colombia	Icedome, Mexico City

Game reference

March 8, 2014; 15:30	Brazil	0 – 14 (?–?, ?–?, ?–?,)	Colombia	Icedome, Mexico City

Game reference

March 8, 2014; 20:30	Mexico	18 – 0 (?–?, ?–?, ?–?,)	Argentina	Icedome, Mexico City

Game reference

== Final round ==
Bronze medal game

(UTC–06:00)

March 9, 2014; 13:30	Colombia	9 – 1 (2–0, 4–0, 3–1)	Argentina	Icedome, Mexico City

Game reference

== Gold medal game ==
(UTC–06:00)

March 9, 2014; 18:30	Mexico	0 – 7 (0–2, 0–3, 0–2)	Canada	Icedome, Mexico City

Game reference

== Final standings ==
2014 Pan American Ice Hockey Tournament

Canada
1st title

Rank	Team
1st place, gold medalist(s)	Canada
2nd place, silver medalist(s)	Mexico
3rd place, bronze medalist(s)	Colombia
4	Argentina
5	Brazil
