= Falkland Islands men's national ice hockey team =

Men's national ice hockey team representing the Falkland Islands

Falkland Islands
- Nickname: Penguines
- Association: Falkland Islands Hockey Association
- Head coach: Grant Budd
- Captain: Grant Budd
- Most games: Grant Budd (18)
- Top scorer: Ryan Bahl (11)
- Most points: Ryan Bahl (18)
- Team colors
- IIHF code: FLK

First international
- Falkland Islands 6–2 Puerto Rico (Coral Springs, United States; 8 September 2019)

Biggest win
- Falkland Islands 6–2 Puerto Rico (Coral Springs, United States; 8 September 2019)

Biggest defeat
- Venezuela 5–3 Falkland Islands (Coral Springs, United States; 16 September 2022)

Amerigol LATAM Cup
- Appearances: 2 (first in 2019)
- Best result: 5th (2019)

International record (W–L–T)
- 1–1–0

The Falkland Islands national ice hockey team is the national men's ice hockey team of the British territory of the Falkland Islands. It is controlled by the Falkland Islands Hockey Association, the governing body that oversees both ice and inline hockey in the territory. The Falkland Islands are not members of the IIHF and therefore not eligible to enter any IIHF World Championship events.

== History ==
The Falkland Islands made their debut in international competition in 2019 at the Amerigol LATAM Cup, sanctioned by the Amerigol International Hockey Association, which took place in Coral Springs, Florida, United States. The team played its first official game against Puerto Rico on 18 September, winning 6–2.

== Tournament record ==
=== Amerigol LATAM Cup ===
Year	Host	Result	Pld	W	OTW	OTL	L
2019	(United States) Coral Springs		4	3	1	0	0
2019	(United States) Coral Springs	Did not participate					
2020	(United States) Coral Springs	Cancelled due to the COVID-19 pandemic					
2021	(United States) Coral Springs	Did not participate					
2022	(United States) Coral Springs		4	1	0	0	3
Total	(United States) Coral Springs		8	4	1	0	3

== All-time record against other national teams ==
Last match update: 16 September 2022

Key
Positive balance (more Wins)
Neutral balance (Wins = Losses)
Negative balance (more Losses)

Team	GP	W	T	L	GF	GA
Puerto Rico	1	1	0	0	6	2
Venezuela	1	0	0	1	3	5
Total	2	1	0	1	9	7
