= Argentine Association of Ice and In-Line Hockey =

Sports governing body in Argentina

Argentina
- Association name: Asociación Argentina de Hockey sobre Hielo y En Línea
- Founded: 1997; 29 years ago
- President: Jorge Haiek

The Argentine Association of Ice and In-Line Hockey (Spanish: Asociación Argentina de Hockey sobre Hielo y En Línea) is the Argentine national governing body for ice and roller in-line hockey, responsible for national men's and women's team, the selection of hockey inline, part of the IIHF World Championships.

== Overview ==
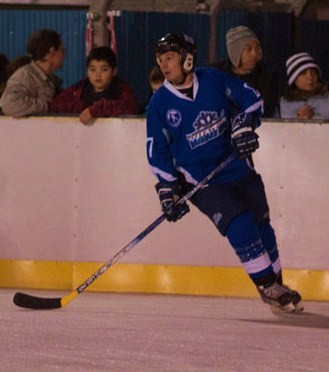
An Argentine national ice hockey player

The Association was established in 1997 by a group of ice and roller hockey players with the purpose of developing both games in Argentina. One year later the organisation registered to the Secretary of Sports, and the International Olympic Committee recognised the AAHHL in 2004.

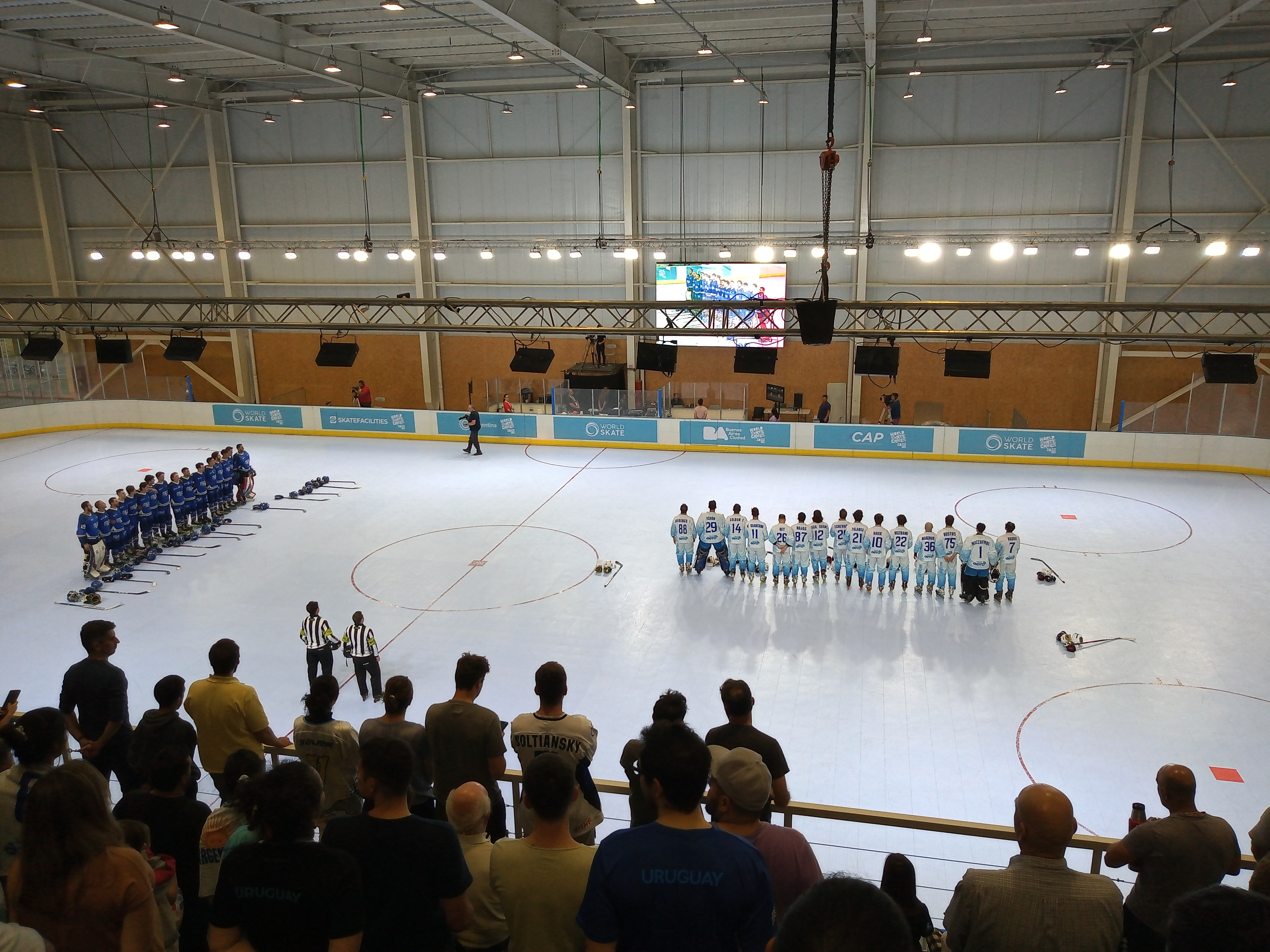
Argentina's inline hockey team facing Italy in the 2022 World Skate Game

Men's and women's team have participated at the Pan American Ice Hockey Tournament. Despite this, ice hockey events are organized by a different institution: the Argentine Ice Hockey Federation (FAHH) organize a metropolitan and a youth league in Buenos Aires and the End-of-the-World Cup in Ushuaia.

The existence of two governing bodies is a difficult issue: while the AAHHL represents both national teams and it's recognized by the International Ice Hockey Federation, its players compete mostly on inline hockey; while FAHH players, who compete on ice hockey, can't be part of the national teams.
