= Colombian Ice Hockey Federation =

Governing body of ice hockey in Colombia

Colombia
- Association name: Federación Colombiana de Hockey Sobre Hielo
- IIHF membership: 26 September 2019
- President: Daniel Fierro Torres

The Colombian Ice Hockey Federation (Spanish: Federación Colombiana de Hockey Sobre Hielo; FCHH) is the governing body of ice hockey in Colombia.

== History ==
The Colombian Ice Hockey Federation was accepted into the International Ice Hockey Federation (IIHF) on 26 September 2019. It was the fourth South American nation to join the IIHF after Brazil, Argentina and Chile, and therefore has no right to vote in the General Assembly. The current president of the federation is Daniel Fierro Torres.

== National teams ==
- Men's national team
- Women's national team

=== Participation by year ===
2019

Colombia was not a member of the IIHF and therefore not eligible to enter any IIHF World Championships.

Event	Host nation	Date	Result
Amerigol LATAM Cup	United States	6–8 September 2019	2nd place
