= Eric Maleson =

Brazilian bobsledder

Personal information
- Born: August 11, 1967 (age 58) Rio de Janeiro, Brazil

Sport
- Sport: Bobsled
Medal record
Bobsled
Representing Brazil
Americas Cup
Bronze medal – third place	2000 Lake Placid	4Man
Bronze medal – third place	2001 Lake Placid	4Man
Bronze medal – third place	2001 Lake Placid	4Man

Eric Leme Walther Maleson is Brazil’s first Olympic bobsled pilot and curler. He is considered the father of ice sports in Brazil. He is also the founder and former president of the Brazilian Ice Sports Federation (CBDG). He was born in Rio de Janeiro, Brazil. Maleson competed at the 2002 Winter Olympic Games in Salt Lake City (4-man bobsled event), has served on the International Luge Federation (FIL) Development Committee (2002–2006), and was also a member of the International Bobsleigh and Skeleton Federation's (IBSF) Court of Arbitration (2006–2010).

Maleson was voted one of the top ten most influential sports figures in Brazil (2002) and was the first Brazilian athlete to carry the Olympic torch during the Salt Lake City torch relay event in Cambridge, Massachusetts, US (December 2001).

In September 2010, Maleson was elected Vice President of Communications of the International Bobsleigh & Skeleton Federation, becoming the first South American elected to the Board of an International Winter Olympic Federation.

He won three career bronze medals at Americas Cup bobsled races (2000, 2001).

The Brazilian Post Service issued a Bobsled stamp to celebrate the historic first Olympic qualification.
