= 2016 IIHF World Championship Division II =

Tournament details
- Host countries: Spain; Mexico
- Venues: 2 (in 2 host cities)
- Dates: 9–15 April
- Teams: 12

The 2016 IIHF World Championship Division II was an international ice hockey tournament run by the International Ice Hockey Federation. Group A was contested in Jaca, Spain and Group B in Mexico City, Mexico on 9–15 April 2016.

== Venues ==
Group A	Group B
Jaca	Mexico City
Pabellón de Hielo de Jaca; Capacity: 3,579	Icedome; Capacity: 4,155

== Group A tournament ==
2016 IIHF World Championship Division II A

Tournament details
- Host country: Spain
- Venue: 1 (in 1 host city)
- Dates: 9–15 April
- Teams: 6

Tournament statistics
- Games played: 15
- Goals scored: 94 (6.27 per game)
- Attendance: 8,297 (553 per game)
- Scoring leader: (Netherlands) Erik Tummers (9 points)

Official website
- IIHF.com

=== Participants ===
Team	Qualification
Netherlands	Placed 6th in Division I B last year and were relegated.
Belgium	Placed 2nd in Division II A last year.
Serbia	Placed 3rd in Division II A last year.
Spain	Host, placed 4th in Division II A last year.
Iceland	Placed 5th in Division II A last year.
China	Placed 1st in Division II B last year and were promoted.

=== Match officials ===
4 referees and 7 linesmen were selected for the tournament.

Referees

- (Kazakhstan) Eduard Ibatulin
- (Poland) Przemysław Kepa
- (Russia) Yuri Oskirko
- (Denmark) Rasmus Toppel

Linesmen

- (Spain) Sergio Biec
- (Czech Republic) Daniel Hynek
- (Slovakia) Lukáš Kacej
- (Spain) Rudy Meyer
- (Hungary) Attila Nagy
- (Sweden) Emil Yletyinen
- (Belarus) Viktor Zinchenko

=== Standings ===
Pos	Team	Pld	W	OTW	OTL	L	GF	GA	GD	Pts	Qualification or relegation
1	Netherlands	5	4	1	0	0	24	6	+18	14	Promoted to Division I B
2	Spain (H)	5	3	1	1	0	17	9	+8	12	
3	Belgium	5	1	2	0	2	15	18	−3	7 (Note: Belgium 4–2 Serbia)	
4	Serbia	5	2	0	1	2	16	14	+2	7	
5	Iceland	5	1	0	1	3	16	23	−7	4	
6	China	5	0	0	1	4	6	24	−18	1	Relegation to Division II B

Source: IIHF
Rules for classification: 1) points; 2) head-to-head points; 3) head-to-head goal difference; 4) head-to-head number of goals scored; 5) result against closest best-ranked team outside tied teams; 6) result against second-best ranked team outside tied teams; 7) seeding before tournament.
(H) Host

=== Results ===
All times are local (UTC+2).

9 April 2016; 13:00	Belgium	5–4 GWS (2–2, 2–1, 0–1) (OT 0–0) (SO: 1–0)	Iceland	Pabellón de Hielo de Jaca, Jaca; Attendance: 120

Game reference

Mike Jansen
Goalies
Snorri Sigurbergsson
Referee:
(Denmark) Rasmus Toppel
Linesmen:
(Czech Republic) Daniel Hynek
(Spain) Rudy Meyer

	0–1	02:02 – Helgason (Pålsson)
	0–2	05:39 – Sigurðsson
De Smet (Van den Bogaert, Distate) – 11:06	1–2
Pellegrims (Gyesbreghs, B. Kolodziejczyk) (PP) – 18:34	2–2
	2–3	29:22 – Sigurðsson
Paulus (Vercammen) – 30:43	3–3
Kolodziejczyk (Pellegrims) – 31:32	4–3
	4–4	59:37 – Sigurðarson (Helgason) (EA)

Distate (miss)
Van den Bogaert (miss)
De Smet
Shootout
(miss) Sigurðarson
(miss) Alengård
(miss) Sigurðsson
12 min
Penalties
10 min
37
Shots
37

9 April 2016; 16:30	Serbia	2–3 (0–0, 2–3, 0–0)	Netherlands	Pabellón de Hielo de Jaca, Jaca; Attendance: 850

Game reference

Arsenije Ranković
Goalies
Sjoerd Idzenga
Referee:
(Russia) Yuri Oskirko
Linesmen:
(Spain) Sergio Biec
(Sweden) Emil Yletyinen

	0–1	23:09 – Hermens (Van Nes)
	0–2	26:59 – Van Nes (Hermens)
	0–3	31:38 – K. Bruijsten (Tummers, Joly)
Raković (Ristić, Đumić) – 36:17	1–3
Popravka (Vučurević, Luković) – 38:26	2–3

10 min
Penalties
6 min
31
Shots
41

9 April 2016; 20:00	China	0–2 (0–1, 0–0, 0–1)	Spain	Pabellón de Hielo de Jaca, Jaca; Attendance: 1,500

Game reference
Xia Shengrong	Goalies	Ander Alcaine	Referee: (Russia) Yuri Oskirko; Linesmen: (Slovakia) Lukáš Kacej (Belarus) Viktor Zinchenko
0–1 / 08:39 – P. Muñoz; 0–2 / 56:37 – Ubieto (A. García) (PP)			Referee: (Russia) Yuri Oskirko; Linesmen: (Slovakia) Lukáš Kacej (Belarus) Viktor Zinchenko
12 min	Penalties	8 min	Referee: (Russia) Yuri Oskirko; Linesmen: (Slovakia) Lukáš Kacej (Belarus) Viktor Zinchenko
15	Shots	34	Referee: (Russia) Yuri Oskirko; Linesmen: (Slovakia) Lukáš Kacej (Belarus) Viktor Zinchenko

10 April 2016; 13:00	Belgium	4–2 (1–2, 1–0, 2–0)	Serbia	Pabellón de Hielo de Jaca, Jaca; Attendance: 150

Game reference

Tom Prodi
Goalies
Arsenije Ranković
Referee:
(Poland) Przemysław Kepa
Linesmen:
(Slovakia) Lukáš Kacej
(Spain) Rudy Meyer

De Smet (Bremer, Van den Bogaert) – 00:49	1–0
	1–1	14:55 – Ristić
	1–2	18:30 – Sretović (Popravka, Vučurević)
Van den Bogaert (Dewin) (PP) – 33:06	2–2
Van den Bogaert (Paulus) – 46:18	3–2
Van den Bogaert (B. Kolodziejczyk, De Smet) (PP, ENG) – 59:25	4–2

10 min
Penalties
12 min
30
Shots
46

10 April 2016; 16:30	Iceland	7–4 (3–2, 2–2, 2–0)	China	Pabellón de Hielo de Jaca, Jaca; Attendance: 250

Game reference

Snorri Sigurbergsson
Dennis Hedström
Goalies
Xia Shengrong
Sun Zehao
Referee:
(Russia) Yuri Oskirko
Linesmen:
(Spain) Sergio Biec
(Czech Republic) Daniel Hynek

Leifsson (Andrésson, R. Hedström) – 03:28	1–0
Andrésson (Guðnason, Sigrunarson) – 12:27	2–0
	2–1	12:35 – Xia (Chen)
Leifsson – 17:41	3–1
	3–2	19:40 – Zhu (Zhang C., Yang)
Sigurðsson (Sigurðsson, Jónsson) – 20:12	4–2
R. Hedström (Helgason, Jónsson) (PP) – 24:03	5–2
	5–3	28:00 – Yang
	5–4	35:32 – Zhang C.
Alengård (Pålsson) (SH) – 44:08	6–4
Sigurðsson (Sigurðsson) (PP) – 58:34	7–4

14 min
Penalties
14 min
47
Shots
21

10 April 2016; 20:00	Netherlands	3–2 OT (0–0, 0–2, 2–0) (OT 1–0)	Spain	Pabellón de Hielo de Jaca, Jaca; Attendance: 1,100

Game reference

Sjoerd Idzenga
Goalies
Ander Alcaine
Referee:
(Denmark) Rasmus Toppel
Linesmen:
(Hungary) Attila Nagy
(Sweden) Emil Yletyinen

	0–1	25:42 – Betrán (Quevedo, Carbonell) (PP)
	0–2	39:37 – Brabo (P. Muñoz)
K. Bruijsten (Tummers, Van Gestel) (PP) – 51:49	1–2
K. Bruijsten (Tummers) – 58:31	2–2
Van Gestel (Tummers) – 62:04	3–2

6 min
Penalties
39 min
38
Shots
22

12 April 2016; 13:00	Netherlands	3–0 (2–0, 0–0, 1–0)	Iceland	Pabellón de Hielo de Jaca, Jaca; Attendance: 102

Game reference

Sjoerd Idzenga
Goalies
Dennis Hedström
Referee:
(Russia) Yuri Oskirko
Linesmen:
(Hungary) Attila Nagy
(Belarus) Viktor Zinchenko

Joly (Tummers, Oosterveld) (SH) – 07:21	1–0
Hermens (Kick) – 08:47	2–0
K. Bruijsten (Joly, Tummers) (ENG) – 59:37	3–0

18 min
Penalties
14 min
53
Shots
25

12 April 2016; 16:30	Belgium	3–2 OT (1–0, 1–1, 0–1) (OT 1–0)	China	Pabellón de Hielo de Jaca, Jaca; Attendance: 148

Game reference

Tom Prodi
Goalies
Xia Shengrong
Referee:
(Kazakhstan) Eduard Ibatulin
Linesmen:
(Spain) Sergio Biec
(Slovakia) Lukáš Kacej

Van den Bogaert (De Smet, Distate) (PP) – 02:26	1–0
	1–1	35:29 – Yang (Hu) (PP)
Bremer (Thurura, Paulus) (PP) – 36:30	2–1
	2–2	40:36 – Zhang H. (Zhang Z.)
Bremer (B. Kolodziejczyk, Gyesbreghs) (PP) – 63:42	3–2

12 min
Penalties
20 min
46
Shots
23

12 April 2016; 20:00	Serbia	3–4 GWS (1–0, 1–1, 1–2) (OT 0–0) (SO: 0–1)	Spain	Pabellón de Hielo de Jaca, Jaca; Attendance: 950

Game reference

Arsenije Ranković
Goalies
Ander Alcaine
Referee:
(Poland) Przemysław Kepa
Linesmen:
(Czech Republic) Daniel Hynek
(Sweden) Emil Yletyinen

Popravka (Vučurević, Filipović) – 04:33	1–0
	1–1	21:12 – Betrán (PP)
Raković (Bjelogrlić) – 27:20	2–1
	2–2	48:25 – Puyuelo (Ubieto)
	2–3	50:17 – Quevedo (Puyuelo, Ubieto)
Milovanović (Đumić) – 51:05	3–3

Sretović (miss)
Popravka (miss)
Milovanović
Milovanović (miss)
Komazec (miss)
Milovanović (miss)
Shootout
(miss) P. Muňoz
Fuentes
(miss) Quevedo
(miss) Fuentes
(miss) Brabo
Fuentes
16 min
Penalties
4 min
25
Shots
38

14 April 2016; 13:00	China	0–9 (0–3, 0–2, 0–4)	Netherlands	Pabellón de Hielo de Jaca, Jaca; Attendance: 60

Game reference

Xia Shengrong
Sun Zehao
Goalies
Sjoerd Idzenga
Referee:
(Denmark) Rasmus Toppel
Linesmen:
(Spain) Sergio Biec
(Czech Republic) Daniel Hynek

0–1	00:08 – Joly (Melissant)
0–2	13:28 – K. Bruijsten (Tummers, Nagtzaam)
0–3	15:32 – Kick (Hermens)
0–4	31:09 – Tummers (Nagtzaam, Van Bentem)
0–5	34:35 – Van Bentem
0–6	41:57 – Van Lijden (Van Bentem, Nagtzaam) (PP)
0–7	45:40 – Van Lijden (Marx, Smid)
0–8	50:45 – Van Lijden (Wurm, Oosterveld)
0–9	53:13 – Kick (Smid, Hermens) (PP)

8 min
Penalties
8 min
23
Shots
49

14 April 2016; 16:30	Iceland	3–6 (3–0, 0–4, 0–2)	Serbia	Pabellón de Hielo de Jaca, Jaca; Attendance: 120

Game reference

Dennis Hedström
Goalies
Arsenije Ranković
Referee:
(Kazakhstan) Eduard Ibatulin
Linesmen:
(Slovakia) Lukáš Kacej
(Sweden) Emil Yletyinen

Andrésson (Alengård, Helgason) (PP) – 01:29	1–0
Leifsson (Alengård) – 08:15	2–0
Andrésson (Guðnason) – 14:15	3–0
	3–1	21:35 – Sretović (PP)
	3–2	23:37 – Filipović
	3–3	31:27 – Sretović (Luković, Đumić)
	3–4	34:12 – Bjelogrlić (Ilić, Bibić) (PP)
	3–5	42:41 – Lestarić (Bibić, Raković)
	3–6	53:26 – Bjelogrlić (Bibić) (PP)

24 min
Penalties
16 min
36
Shots
53

14 April 2016; 20:00	Spain	4–1 (3–0, 1–1, 0–0)	Belgium	Pabellón de Hielo de Jaca, Jaca; Attendance: 1,150

Game reference

Ander Alcaine
Goalies
Tom Prodi
Mike Jansen
Referee:
(Poland) Przemysław Kepa
Linesmen:
(Hungary) Attila Nagy
(Belarus) Viktor Zinchenko

Puyuelo (Quevedo, Hernández) – 05:19	1–0
Fuentes (Ubieto) – 11:06	2–0
Solórzano (J. Muñoz, Fuentes) – 13:56	3–0
	3–1	25:59 – Pellegrims (B. Kolodziejczyk, Vercammen)
J. Muñoz (Fuentes, Solórzano) – 32:37	4–1

10 min
Penalties
6 min
32
Shots
28

15 April 2016; 13:00	Serbia	3–0 (0–0, 2–0, 1–0)	China	Pabellón de Hielo de Jaca, Jaca; Attendance: 67

Game reference

Arsenije Ranković
Petar Stepanović
Goalies
Xia Shengrong
Referee:
(Denmark) Rasmus Toppel
Linesmen:
(Spain) Sergio Biec
(Hungary) Attila Nagy

Sretović (Popravka, Raković) – 20:45	1–0
Raković (Podunavac) – 32:08	2–0
Luković (Filipović) – 45:22	3–0

8 min
Penalties
12 min
44
Shots
18

15 April 2016; 16:30	Netherlands	6–2 (3–0, 1–1, 2–1)	Belgium	Pabellón de Hielo de Jaca, Jaca; Attendance: 250

Game reference

Sjoerd Idzenga
Goalies
Mike Jansen
Referee:
(Russia) Yuri Oskirko
Linesmen:
(Sweden) Emil Yletyinen
(Belarus) Viktor Zinchenko

Wurm (Nagtzaam, Van Bentem) (PP2) – 04:43	1–0
Melissant (Joly, K. Bruijsten) – 12:04	2–0
Oosterveld (Tummers, Van Gestel) – 15:27	3–0
Van Lijden (Van Nes) – 32:41	4–0
	4–1	37:21 – A. Kolodziejczyk (Gyesbreghs, Van Rooy)
Wurm (Van Bentem) – 44:27	5–1
Van Lijden (Van Bentem, Nagtzaam) (PP) – 48:39	6–1
	6–2	53:46 – Vercammen (Goris, Gyesbreghs)

31 min
Penalties
14 min
43
Shots
24

15 April 2016; 20:00	Spain	5–2 (1–1, 2–1, 2–0)	Iceland	Pabellón de Hielo de Jaca, Jaca; Attendance: 1,480

Game reference

Ignacio García
Goalies
Snorri Sigurbergsson
Referee:
(Kazakhstan) Eduard Ibatulin
Linesmen:
(Czech Republic) Daniel Hynek
(Slovakia) Lukáš Kacej

Pantoja (P. Muñoz) (PP) – 08:42	1–0
	1–1	12:36 – Mikaelsson (Sigurðsson, Sigurðarson)
Brabo (Carbonell, P. Muñoz) – 34:18	2–1
	2–2	34:43 – Leifsson (Alengård, R. Hedström)
González (Quevedo, Vicente) – 38:02	3–2
Solórzano (P. Muñoz) – 48:26	4–2
J. Muñoz – 51:41	5–2

8 min
Penalties
20 min
27
Shots
25

=== Awards and statistics ===
==== Awards ====
- Best players selected by the directorate:
  - Best Goalkeeper: (Spain) Ander Alcaine
  - Best Defenseman: (Netherlands) Erik Tummers
  - Best Forward: (Belgium) Ben Van den Bogaert

Source: IIHF.com

==== Scoring leaders ====
List shows the top skaters sorted by points, then goals.

Player	GP	G	A	Pts	+/−	PIM	POS
(Netherlands) Erik Tummers	5	1	8	9	+11	2	D
(Netherlands) Kevin Bruijsten	5	5	1	6	+5	4	F
(Belgium) Ben Van den Bogaert	5	4	2	6	0	2	F
(Netherlands) Raphael Joly	5	2	4	6	+6	29	F
(Netherlands) Alan van Bentem	5	1	5	6	+2	4	F
(Netherlands) Julian van Lijden	5	5	0	5	+2	2	F
(Belgium) Yoren De Smet	5	3	2	5	+2	6	F
(Serbia) Nenad Raković	5	3	2	5	+5	0	F
(Netherlands) Max Hermens	5	2	3	5	+4	6	F
(Iceland) Robert Sigurðsson	5	2	3	5	–1	0	F

GP = Games played; G = Goals; A = Assists; Pts = Points; +/− = Plus/minus; PIM = Penalties in minutes; POS = Position
Source: IIHF.com

==== Goaltending leaders ====
Only the top five goaltenders, based on save percentage, who have played at least 40% of their team's minutes, are included in this list.

Player	TOI	GA	GAA	SA	Sv%	SO
(Netherlands) Sjoerd Idzenga	282:04	6	1.28	116	94.83	1
(Spain) Ander Alcaine	247:04	7	1.70	106	93.40	1
(Belgium) Tom Prodi	134:38	6	2.67	74	91.89	0
(Serbia) Arsenije Ranković	299:25	13	2.61	160	91.88	0
(Iceland) Dennis Hedström	157:28	10	3.81	120	91.67	0

TOI = Time on ice (minutes:seconds); SA = Shots against; GA = Goals against; GAA = Goals against average; Sv% = Save percentage; SO = Shutouts
Source: IIHF.com

== Group B tournament ==
2016 IIHF World Championship Division II B

Tournament details
- Host country: Mexico
- Venue: 1 (in 1 host city)
- Dates: 9–15 April
- Teams: 6

Tournament statistics
- Games played: 15
- Goals scored: 169 (11.27 per game)
- Attendance: 5,315 (354 per game)
- Scoring leader: (Australia) Wehebe Darge (24 points)

Official website
- IIHF.com

=== Participants ===
Team	Qualification
Australia	Placed 6th in Division II A last year and were relegated.
New Zealand	Placed 2nd in Division II B last year.
Mexico	Host, placed 3rd in Division II B last year.
Bulgaria	Placed 4th in Division II B last year.
Israel	Placed 5th in Division II B last year.
North Korea	Placed 1st in Division III last year and were promoted.

=== Match officials ===
4 referees and 6 linesmen were selected for the tournament.

Referees

- (Netherlands) Martin de Wilde
- (Hungary) Miklós Haszonits
- (Canada) Mario Maillet
- (United States) Stephen Thomson

Linesmen

- (United States) William Hancock
- (Canada) Michael Harrington
- (United Kingdom) James Kavanagh
- (Netherlands) Jos Korte
- (Mexico) Sem Ramírez
- (Belgium) Maarten Van den Acker

=== Standings ===
Pos	Team	Pld	W	OTW	OTL	L	GF	GA	GD	Pts	Qualification or relegation
1	Australia	5	4	1	0	0	58	10	+48	14	Promoted to Division II A
2	Mexico (H)	5	4	0	1	0	30	13	+17	13	
3	Israel	5	2	0	0	3	22	33	−11	6 (Note: Head-to-head points and goal difference: Israel 3, 11–10; New Zealand 3, 10–10; North Korea 3, 11–12)	
4	New Zealand	5	2	0	0	3	27	19	+8	6	
5	North Korea	5	2	0	0	3	24	42	−18	6	
6	Bulgaria	5	0	0	0	5	8	52	−44	0	Relegation to Division III

Source: IIHF
Rules for classification: 1) points; 2) head-to-head points; 3) head-to-head goal difference; 4) head-to-head number of goals scored; 5) result against closest best-ranked team outside tied teams; 6) result against second-best ranked team outside tied teams; 7) seeding before tournament.
(H) Host

=== Results ===
All times are local (UTC−5).

9 April 2016; 13:00	New Zealand	6–3 (3–0, 1–2, 2–1)	Israel	Icedome, Mexico City; Attendance: 115

Game reference

Rick Parry
Goalies
Alexander Loginov
Maxim Gokhberg
Referee:
(Netherlands) Martin de Wilde
Linesmen:
(Canada) Michael Harrington
(Mexico) Sem Ramírez

Henderson (Heyd) (PP) – 02:27	1–0
Harrison (M. Frear) – 10:45	2–0
Ruddle (Harrop, Challis) – 12:15	3–0
	3–1	23:57 – Klein (Aharonovich) (PP)
Ruddle (Challis, Harrop) – 24:28	4–1
	4–2	29:37 – Mazour
	4–3	43:07 – Klein (Spivak)
Cox (Lawrence) – 49:08	5–3
Lawrence (Challis, Harrop) (PP) – 54:19	6–3

12 min
Penalties
14 min
38
Shots
32

9 April 2016; 16:30	North Korea	9–3 (4–1, 2–1, 3–1)	Bulgaria	Icedome, Mexico City; Attendance: 200

Game reference

Pak Kuk-chol
Pak Il
Goalies
Dimitar Dimitrov
Todor Petkov
Referee:
(Hungary) Miklós Haszonits
Linesmen:
(Netherlands) Jos Korte
(Belgium) Maarten Van den Acker

Kim N. (Kim K.-h.) – 01:34	1–0
Hong (Kim H., Ri P.) – 02:30	2–0
Hong (Kim S., An) (PP) – 04:58	3–0
	3–1	10:58 – Abdi
Ri P. (Ri C., Kim H.) – 17:46	4–1
Kim K.-c. (Kang M., Pak S.) – 22:05	5–1
Kim H. (Ri C.) – 25:21	6–1
	6–2	29:22 – Georgiev (Iskrenov)
	6–3	45:13 – Abdi (Petkov)
Kim M. (Kim K.-h., Kim N.) (PP) – 48:01	7–3
An – 54:04	8–3
An (Pak S.) – 56:55	9–3

4 min
Penalties
32 min
45
Shots
16

9 April 2016; 20:00	Mexico	4–5 OT (1–0, 1–4, 2–0) (OT 0–1)	Australia	Icedome, Mexico City; Attendance: 2,000

Game reference

Andrés de la Garma
Goalies
Anthony Kimlin
Referee:
(Canada) Mario Maillet
Linesmen:
(United States) William Hancock
(United Kingdom) James Kavanagh

Majul (Cervantes) – 07:07	1–0
Majul (Ugarte, Cervantes) – 25:28	2–0
	2–1	28:01 – Jones (Powell, Humphries) (PP2)
	2–2	31:10 – Darge (Todd, Malloy) (SH)
	2–3	35:19 – Humphries (Powell, Webster) (PP)
	2–4	39:14 – Byers (Darge, Schlamp)
Cervantes (Majul) – 40:28	3–4
Arroyo (Ugarte, Cervantes) (PP) – 55:37	4–4
	4–5	63:42 – Humphries (SH)

18 min
Penalties
32 min
33
Shots
38

10 April 2016; 13:00	Israel	8–4 (5–1, 2–1, 1–2)	North Korea	Icedome, Mexico City; Attendance: 20

Game reference

Maxim Gokhberg
Goalies
Pak Kuk-chol
Pak Il
Referee:
(Canada) Mario Maillet
Linesmen:
(United States) William Hancock
(Netherlands) Jos Korte

Kniter (Aharonovich) – 01:53	1–0
Rosenthal (Klein, Maaravi) – 03:27	2–0
Spektor (SH) – 05:30	3–0
Spektor (Aharonovich, Mazour) – 16:18	4–0
Pyshkin (Klein) – 17:07	5–0
	5–1	19:44 – Ri C. (Kim K.-h., Kim N.) (PP)
Aharonovich (Klein, Pyshkin) (PP) – 24:50	6–1
Schwarzman (Mazour, Spektor) (PP) – 26:23	7–1
	7–2	37:19 – Hong (Ri C.)
	7–3	56:16 – Kim K.-c. (PP)
Spivak (Pyshkin, Schwarzman) – 56:43	8–3
	8–4	59:59 – Kim K.-c. (Ri C.)

44 min
Penalties
36 min
38
Shots
42

10 April 2016; 16:30	Australia	14–0 (2–0, 6–0, 6–0)	Bulgaria	Icedome, Mexico City; Attendance: 150

Game reference

Anthony Kimlin
Charlie Smart
Goalies
Todor Petkov
Dimitar Dimitrov
Referee:
(United States) Stephen Thomson
Linesmen:
(Mexico) Sem Ramírez
(Belgium) Maarten Van den Acker

Schlamp (Darge, Todd) – 14:46	1–0
Tesarik – 15:16	2–0
Humphries (Byers, McKenzie) (SH) – 23:00	3–0
Humphries (Powell) – 27:43	4–0
Todd – 31:42	5–0
Darge (Jones, Byers) – 32:23	6–0
Baranzelli (Huxley) (PP) – 36:18	7–0
Todd (Kyros) (SH) – 39:48	8–0
Webster (Malloy) – 40:43	9–0
Schlamp (Darge) – 40:58	10–0
Darge (Webster, Huxley) – 45:35	11–0
Todd (Darge, Malloy) – 48:45	12–0
Humphries (Webster) (PP) – 52:52	13–0
McKenzie (Tesarik, Jones) – 54:35	14–0

8 min
Penalties
4 min
40
Shots
7

10 April 2016; 20:00	New Zealand	1–2 (0–0, 1–0, 0–2)	Mexico	Icedome, Mexico City; Attendance: 500

Game reference

Rick Parry
Goalies
Alfonso de Alba
Referee:
(Hungary) Miklós Haszonits
Linesmen:
(Canada) Michael Harrington
(United Kingdom) James Kavanagh

Cox (PS) – 22:43	1–0
	1–1	42:42 – Arroyo (PP)
	1–2	43:37 – Arroyo (Cervantes, Ugarte)

12 min
Penalties
6 min
18
Shots
26

12 April 2016; 13:00	Australia	11–3 (6–2, 3–0, 2–1)	Israel	Icedome, Mexico City; Attendance: 40

Game reference

Anthony Kimlin
Goalies
Maxim Gokhberg
Alexander Loginov
Referee:
(Canada) Mario Maillet
Linesmen:
(United States) William Hancock
(Mexico) Sem Ramírez

	0–1	00:49 – Rosenthal (Pyshkin, Shwarzman)
Stringer (Darge) – 03:11	1–1
Webster – 03:37	2–1
Todd (PP) – 10:42	3–1
Tesarik (Powell) (PP) – 12:41	4–1
Baranzelli (Darge, Todd) (PP) – 17:15	5–1
McKenzie (Tesarik, Jones) – 17:36	6–1
	6–2	19:46 – Pishkin (Spivak, Kafri) (PP)
Baranzelli (Webster, Powell) – 25:20	7–2
McKenzie (Tesarik, Jones) – 26:58	8–2
Darge (Baranzelli, Todd) – 34:25	9–2
Tesarik (Webster, Powell) (PP) – 41:13	10–2
Darge (Todd) (SH) – 48:23	11–2
	11–3	53:09 – Rosenthal (Spivak, Mazour) (PP2)

69 min
Penalties
30 min
47
Shots
35

12 April 2016; 16:30	New Zealand	4–7 (0–0, 2–3, 2–4)	North Korea	Icedome, Mexico City; Attendance: 50

Game reference

Rick Parry
Goalies
Pak Kuk-chol
Referee:
(United States) Stephen Thomson
Linesmen:
(Canada) Michael Harrington
(United Kingdom) James Kavanagh

Frear (Sandoy, Darling) – 22:03	1–0
	1–1	22:24 – Ri P. (H.)
Henderson (Heyd, Ratcliffe) (PP) – 30:22	2–1
	2–2	35:19 – Kang I. (Kim M., Kim K.-h.)
	2–3	38:18 – Kang I. (Kim M.) (PP)
	2–4	40:58 – Hong (Ri C., An) (PP2)
Cox – 46:21	3–4
	3–5	47:28 – Hong (Ri C., Ri P.) (PP)
Cox (Heyd) – 47:55	4–5
	4–6	58:55 – Ri C. (ENG)
	4–7	59:22 – Kim M. (ENG)

46 min
Penalties
8 min
30
Shots
44

12 April 2016; 20:00	Mexico	10–1 (4–0, 4–1, 2–0)	Bulgaria	Icedome, Mexico City; Attendance: 500

Game reference

Andrés de la Garma
Alfonso de Alba
Goalies
Dimitar Dimitrov
Referee:
(Netherlands) Martin de Wilde
Linesmen:
(Netherlands) Jos Korte
(Belgium) Maarten Van den Acker

Arroyo (Gómez) – 00:47	1–0
De la Vega (Majul, Arroyo) (PP) – 06:19	2–0
Cervantes (Ugarte) (PP2, EA) – 19:50	3–0
Chabat (Gómez) (PP2) – 19:59	4–0
Gómez (Gutiérrez, Escandón) (PP) – 24:02	5–0
	5–1	27:37 – Dikov (Iskrenov)
Chabat (Ugarte, Majul) – 31:08	6–1
De la Vega (PP) – 34:28	7–1
Gutiérrez (De la Vega) – 35:40	8–1
Carrero (De la Vega, Dueñas) – 42:41	9–1
Arroyo (Smithers, Gómez) – 56:54	10–1

10 min
Penalties
22 min
43
Shots
7

14 April 2016; 13:00	Bulgaria	1–14 (0–6, 1–6, 0–2)	New Zealand	Icedome, Mexico City; Attendance: 30

Game reference

Dimitar Dimitrov
Todor Petkov
Goalies
Rick Parry
Michael Hopkinson
Referee:
(Netherlands) Martin de Wilde
Linesmen:
(Netherlands) Jos Korte
(Mexico) Sem Ramírez

	0–1	02:50 – Henderson (Cox)
	0–2	03:36 – Ratcliffe (Harrop, Burns)
	0–3	03:54 – Ruddle (PS)
	0–4	09:23 – Burns (Ratcliffe, Harrop)
	0–5	14:45 – Burns (Heyd) (PP)
	0–6	17:58 – Ratcliffe (Cox)
	0–7	20:28 – M. Frear (Cox, Harrison)
	0–8	23:28 – Henderson (M. Frear, Harrison)
	0–9	24:46 – Ruddle (Burns, Lawrence) (PP2)
Iskrenov (PS) – 25:09	1–9
	1–10	27:05 – Harrison (Cox)
	1–11	32:38 – Ratcliffe (Sandoy, Cox)
	1–12	34:40 – Challis (Ruddle)
	1–13	45:46 – Cox (Henderson, Ratcliffe) (PP)
	1–14	55:58 – Burns (Ratcliffe, Harrop)

16 min
Penalties
8 min
12
Shots
41

14 April 2016; 16:30	North Korea	1–22 (1–5, 0–9, 0–8)	Australia	Icedome, Mexico City; Attendance: 60

Game reference

Pak Il
Pak Kuk-chol
Goalies
Anthony Kimlin
Charlie Smart
Referee:
(Hungary) Miklós Haszonits
Linesmen:
(United Kingdom) James Kavanagh
(Belgium) Maarten Van den Acker

	0–1	00:38 – Webster (Powell, Humphries)
	0–2	01:19 – Todd (Schlamp, Malloy)
	0–3	08:24 – Darge (Schlamp, Lindsay)
Pak (Kang M.) – 14:23	1–3
	1–4	14:51 – Darge (Huxley, Baranzelli)
	1–5	19:16 – Rummukainen (Darge, Baranzelli) (PP2)
	1–6	20:44 – Malloy (Webster, Tesarik) (PP)
	1–7	22:15 – McKenzie (Huxley) (SH)
	1–8	23:46 – Powell (Humphries, Webster)
	1–9	27:30 – Todd (Baranzelli, Schlamp)
	1–10	31:14 – Schlamp (Todd, Darge)
	1–11	31:38 – Todd (Lindsay, Malloy)
	1–12	35:15 – Malloy (Webster, Powell) (PP)
	1–13	35:31 – Humphries (Byers, Webster)
	1–14	37:07 – Schlamp (Todd, Darge) (PP)
	1–15	41:58 – Powell (Malloy, Webster) (PP)
	1–16	44:10 – Schlamp (Baranzelli, Darge)
	1–17	47:50 – Webster (Powell, Malloy) (PP2)
	1–18	48:48 – Darge (Baranzelli, Huxley) (PP)
	1–19	52:01 – Humphries
	1–20	55:03 – Byers (Humphries, Webster)
	1–21	55:40 – Darge (Todd, Rummukainen)
	1–22	59:59 – McKenzie (Kyros, Rummukainen) (PP)

22 min
Penalties
10 min
17
Shots
42

14 April 2016; 20:00	Israel	3–9 (2–2, 0–4, 1–3)	Mexico	Icedome, Mexico City; Attendance: 400

Game reference

Andrés de la Garma
Goalies
Maxim Gokhberg
Referee:
(United States) Stephen Thomson
Linesmen:
(United States) William Hancock
(Canada) Michael Harrington

	0–1	00:50 – Gómez (Arroyo)
	0–2	01:45 – Majul (Cervantes)
Rosenthal (Mazour, Spektor) (PP) – 04:36	1–2
Ben Tov (Kniter, Spivak) – 12:47	2–2

10 min
Penalties
10 min
14
Shots
33

15 April 2016; 13:00	Australia	6–2 (2–0, 4–0, 0–2)	New Zealand	Icedome, Mexico City; Attendance: 200

Game reference

Anthony Kimlin
Goalies
Rick Parry
Referee:
(Netherlands) Martin de Wilde
Linesmen:
(United States) William Hancock
(Canada) Michael Harrington

Kyros (Darge) – 07:11	1–0
Huxley (Todd) (PP) – 18:06	2–0
Darge (Todd) – 23:31	3–0
Humphries (Tesarik, Powell) (PP) – 30:50	4–0
Humphries (Tesarik) (PP) – 33:46	5–0
Darge (Todd) – 39:43	6–0
	6–1	45:44 – M. Frear (Heyd, Challis)
	6–2	55:39 – Ratcliffe (Harrop)

8 min
Penalties
12 min
39
Shots
24

15 April 2016; 16:30	Bulgaria	3–5 (1–1, 2–2, 0–2)	Israel	Icedome, Mexico City; Attendance: 50

Game reference

Dimitar Dimitrov
Goalies
Alexander Loginov
Referee:
(United States) Stephen Thomson
Linesmen:
(United Kingdom) James Kavanagh
(Mexico) Sem Ramírez

Iskrenov (Georgiev) – 08:29	1–0
	1–1	19:58 – Pyshkin (Margoulis, Mazour)
Iskrenov – 25:15	2–1
	2–2	31:14 – Nosankov (Rosenthal, Kafri) (PP)
	2–3	35:20 – Ben Tov
Dikov (Boyadjiev) – 36:44	3–3
	3–4	46:57 – Aharonovich (PP2)
	3–5	59:24 – Mazour (ENG)

14 min
Penalties
4 min
10
Shots
53

15 April 2016; 20:00	Mexico	5–3 (0–1, 3–0, 2–2)	North Korea	Icedome, Mexico City; Attendance: 1,000

Game reference

Alfonso de Alba
Goalies
Pak Kuk-chol
Referee:
(Canada) Mario Maillet
Linesmen:
(Netherlands) Jos Korte
(Belgium) Maarten van den Acker

	0–1	05:19 – Hong (Kim H., Ri P.)
Majul (De la Vega) (SH) – 32:44	1–1
Arroyo (Majul, Cervantes) (PP) – 36:01	2–1
Majul – 37:09	3–1
Arroyo (Pérez) – 44:32	4–1
	4–2	45:27 – Kang M. (Pak S.)
	4–3	53:19 – Hong (Ri C.)
Arroyo (PS) – 56:03	5–3

41 min
Penalties
10 min
28
Shots
17

=== Awards and statistics ===
==== Awards ====
- Best players selected by the directorate:
  - Best Goalkeeper: (Australia) Anthony Kimlin
  - Best Defenseman: (Australia) Paul Baranzelli
  - Best Forward: (Mexico) Héctor Majul

Source: IIHF.com

==== Scoring leaders ====
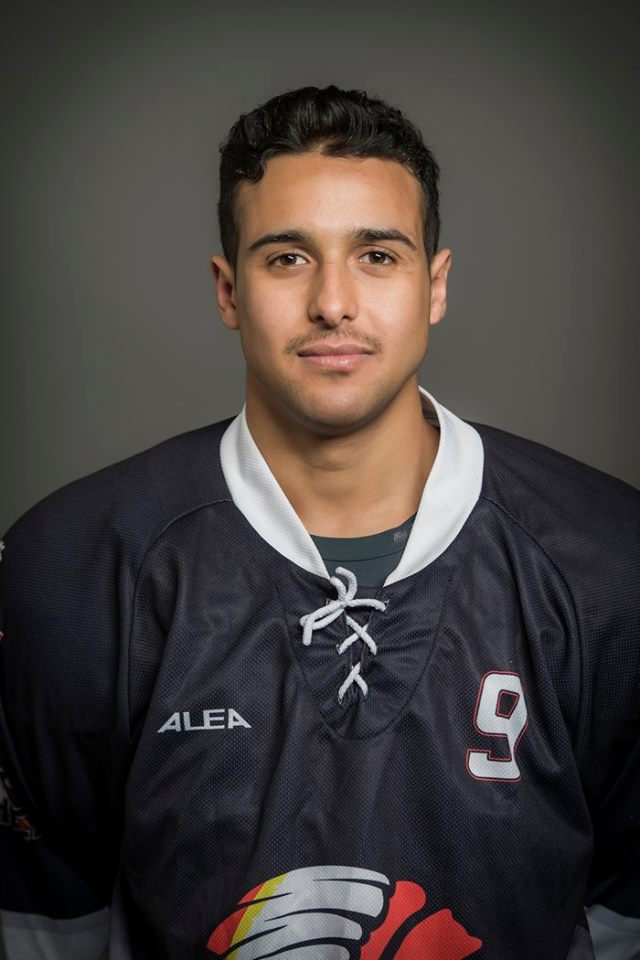
Wehebe Darge of Australia led Division IIB in scoring, with 24 points in 5 games.

List shows the top skaters sorted by points, then goals.

Player	GP	G	A	Pts	+/−	PIM	POS
(Australia) Wehebe Darge	5	11	13	24	+25	2	F
(Australia) Cameron Todd	5	8	13	21	+23	14	F
(Australia) Lliam Webster	5	5	11	16	+5	18	F
(Australia) Mitch Humphries	5	8	5	13	+2	4	F
(Mexico) Héctor Majul	5	7	6	13	+7	16	F
(Mexico) Adrián Cervantes	5	3	10	13	+8	6	F
(Mexico) Brian Arroyo	5	8	4	12	0	2	F
(Australia) Thomas Powell	5	2	10	12	0	4	F
(Australia) Robert Malloy	5	2	9	11	+14	2	D
(New Zealand) Andrew Cox	5	5	5	10	+6	14	F

GP = Games played; G = Goals; A = Assists; Pts = Points; +/− = Plus/minus; PIM = Penalties in minutes; POS = Position
Source: IIHF.com

==== Goaltending leaders ====
Only the top five goaltenders, based on save percentage, who have played at least 40% of their team's minutes, are included in this list.

Player	TOI	GA	GAA	SA	Sv%	SO
(Australia) Anthony Kimlin	254:56	10	2.35	109	90.83	0
(Mexico) Alfonso de Alba	148:52	4	1.61	38	89.47	0
(New Zealand) Rick Parry	258:48	16	3.71	142	88.73	0
(Israel) Maxim Gokhberg	173:40	18	6.22	120	85.00	0
(Mexico) Andrés de la Garma	154:50	9	3.49	56	83.93	0

TOI = Time on ice (minutes:seconds); SA = Shots against; GA = Goals against; GAA = Goals against average; Sv% = Save percentage; SO = Shutouts
Source: IIHF.com
