= Brazil women's national ice hockey team =

Brazil
- Nickname: Yellow Eagles (Águias Amarelas)
- Association: Confederação Brasileira de Desportos no Gelo
- Team colors
- IIHF code: BRA

Ranking
- Current IIHF: (▲ ) (21 April 2025)

First international
- Argentina 14–0 Brazil (Mexico City, Mexico; 5 June 2017)

Biggest defeat
- Mexico 17–0 Brazil (Mexico City, Mexico; 6 June 2017)

International record (W–L–T)
- 0–5–0

The Brazilian women's national ice hockey team (Portuguese: Seleção Brasileira Feminina de Hóquei no Gelo) is the national women's ice hockey team of Brazil. The team is controlled by the Brazilian Ice Sports Federation and as an associate member of the International Ice Hockey Federation (IIHF). Brazil is currently not ranked in the IIHF World Ranking and has still not actively competing in any World Championship.
