= Lebanon men's national ice hockey team =

Men's national ice hockey team representing Lebanon

Lebanon
- The Lebanese cedar tree is the badge used on the players jerseys.
- Association: Lebanese Ice Hockey Federation
- General manager: Ricardo Tabet
- Head coach: Gregg Kennedy
- Captain: Christopher Issa
- Most games: Jason Daraiche (24)
- Top scorer: Danny Akkouche (16)
- Most points: Danny Akkouche (32)
- Team colors
- IIHF code: LIB

Ranking
- Current IIHF: NR (3 June 2026)

First international
- Lebanon 7–4 Haiti (Saint-Laurent, Canada; 23 April 2017)

Biggest win
- Lebanon 15–5 Oman (Kuwait City, Kuwait; 10 May 2023)

Biggest defeat
- Jamaica 12–8 Lebanon (Oshawa, Canada; 13 July 2024)

Amerigol LATAM Cup
- Appearances: 1 (first in 2021)
- Best result: 3rd (2021)

Arab Cup
- Appearances: 1 (first in 2023)
- Best result: 1st (2023)

International record (W–L–T)
- 20–9–0

Medal record

Amerigol LATAM Cup
Bronze medal – third place	2021 Coral Springs	Division 1

Arab Cup
Gold medal – first place	2023 Kuwait City	

The Lebanon national ice hockey team (Arabic: منتخب لبنان لهوكي الجليد; French: Équipe du Liban de hockey sur glace) is the national men's ice hockey team of Lebanon. The team is controlled by the Lebanese Ice Hockey Federation, and on 26 September 2019, became an associate member of the International Ice Hockey Federation (IIHF). Lebanon is currently not ranked in the IIHF World Ranking and has not entered in any IIHF World Championship events. However, the team currently ranks 22nd in the Asian men’s hockey standings.

== History ==
The Lebanese Ice Hockey Federation, abbreviated as LIHF, and known in French as Fédération Libanaise de Hockey sur Glace, is the governing body that oversees the Lebanese local and international ice hockey teams and development program. Currently based in Montreal, Quebec, Canada, with youth operations based in Beirut, the LIHF also manages the Lebanese national team at international tournaments and friendly matches.

Working closely with Lebanese and Canadian governmental organizations such as the Lebanese Olympic Committee (LOC), the Lebanese Embassy in Canada, the Canadian Embassy in Lebanon, and the Lebanese Business Council of Abu Dhabi. The LIHF is in the current process of filling its requirement to be a member of the International Ice Hockey Federation (IIHF) in the hopes to participate in the official IIHF World Championships, but Lebanon was not a member of the IIHF.

=== Canadian players of Lebanese-origin ===
There are notable players of Lebanese-origin have played in Canada, Nazem Kadri who currently plays for the Calgary Flames in the NHL, most notably winning the Stanley Cup with the Colorado Avalanche in 2022, Fabian Joseph who represented Canada, and Ed Hatoum who also played in the NHL for Detroit, and then Vancouver. Kadri also represented Canada internationally. Hatoum was born in Beirut. Joseph awarded two silver medals at the Winter Olympics in 1992 and 1994.

=== National team ===
Lebanon played a friendly match against Haiti (consists of mostly Canadian-based players) on 23 April 2017 in Saint-Laurent, a borough of Montreal, Quebec, Canada, with both teams making their international debut. Lebanon get its first international win over Haiti by a score of 7–4.

== Tournament record ==
=== Amerigol LATAM Cup ===
Year	Host	Result	Pld	W	OTW	OTL	L
2021	(United States) Coral Springs	3rd place (Division 1)	4	3	0	0	1
Total		1/1	4	3	0	0	1

=== Arab Cup ===
Year	Host	Result	Pld	W	OTW	OTL	L
2023	Kuwait City	1st place	5	5	0	0	0
Total		1/1	5	5	0	0	0

== All-time record against other national teams ==
Last match update: 10 May 2026

Key
Positive balance (more Wins)
Neutral balance (Wins = Losses)
Negative balance (more Losses)

Team	GP	W	T	L	GF	GA
Algeria	1	1	0	0	10	3
Bahrain	1	1	0	0	8	1
Colombia	3	2	0	1	20	11
Egypt	2	2	0	0	12	0
Haiti	1	1	0	0	7	4
Jamaica	9	4	0	5	56	57
Kuwait	1	1	0	0	9	4
Morocco	1	1	0	0	5	3
Oman	1	1	0	0	15	5
Puerto Rico	8	5	0	3	44	32
Venezuela	1	1	0	0	7	2
Total	29	20	0	9	193	122

== All-time record against clubs and B teams ==
Last match update: 16 July 2023

Team	GP	W	T	L	GF	GA
(United Arab Emirates) Abu Dhabi Storm	2	0	0	2	4	7
(Canada) Argenteuil HC	3	2	0	1	12	9
Belarus PT	1	0	0	1	1	7
(Tunisia) Carthage Eagles	1	1	0	0	8	3
Egypt Pharaohs*	2	2	0	0	23	2
(United Arab Emirates) EHL All-Stars	1	0	0	1	2	4
(Germany) German Hockey Legends	1	0	0	1	4	5
Greece HT	3	2	0	1	29	16
(Algeria) HC Alger Corsaires	1	1	0	0	16	3
(Saudi Arabia) Jeddah Eagles	1	1	0	0	7	1
(African Union) Maghreb United	1	1	0	0	8	3
(Canada) Marieville Red Knights	1	1	0	0	11	6
Mexico Selects	1	1	0	0	7	3
(Canada) Philippines Flyers	1	1	0	0	17	1
Total	20	13	0	7	149	70

Note: Lebanon was awarded a 9–0 win over the Egyptian club team, but capped at 5–0 due to a blowout rule.

== See also ==
- Lebanon men's national ball hockey team
