= Mexico men's national ice hockey team =

Men's national ice hockey team representing Mexico

Mexico
- Association: Federación Deportiva de Mexico de Hockey sobre Hielo (FDMHH)
- General manager: Joaquin de la Garma
- Head coach: Diego de la Garma
- Assistants: Bernd Haake
- Captain: Héctor Majul
- Most games: Fernando Ugarte (134)
- Top scorer: Adrian Cervantes (72)
- Most points: Adrian Cervantes (142)
- Team colors
- IIHF code: MEX

Ranking
- Current IIHF: 45 (3 June 2026)
- Highest IIHF: 32 (2010, 2014, 2015)
- Lowest IIHF: 43 (2005–06, 2025)

First international
- Belgium 5–0 Mexico (Reykjavík, Iceland; 10 April 2000)

Biggest win
- Mexico 48–0 Armenia (Mexico City, Mexico; 11 March 2005)

Biggest defeat
- Romania 19–0 Mexico (Bucharest, Romania; 26 March 2001)

IIHF World Championships
- Appearances: 25 (first in 2000)
- Best result: 35th (2008)

Pan American Tournament
- Appearances: 4 (first in 2014)
- Best result: 1st (2017)

International record (W–L–T)
- 63–81–2

Medal record

Pan American Tournament
Gold medal – first place	2017 Mexico City	
Silver medal – second place	2014 Mexico City	
Silver medal – second place	2015 Mexico City	
Silver medal – second place	2016 Mexico City	

IIHF World Championship Division III
Gold medal – first place	2005 Mexico City	
Bronze medal – third place	2004 Reykjavik	

The Mexico national ice hockey team (Spanish: Selección Mexicana de hockey sobre hielo) is the national men's ice hockey team of Mexico. The team is controlled by the Mexico Ice Hockey Federation (Spanish: Federación Deportiva de Mexico de Hockey sobre Hielo) and a member of the International Ice Hockey Federation (IIHF). As of 28 May 2023, Mexico is currently ranked 37th in the IIHF World Ranking.

== History ==
Mexico joined the IIHF on 30 April 1985. They played their first game during the 2000 World Championships, losing to Belgium (5–0). Since then they have participated in every World Championship and are currently in Division III A. Mexico is the only Latin American team that competes in IIHF tournaments. Mexico hosted the Pan American Tournament from 2014 to 2017, losing to the Canada Selects once and to Colombia in the final match three times. In 2017, Mexico won its first Pan American Tournament, went undefeated 6–0 after defeating Colombia in the final.

Mexico won the IIHF World Championship Division III as host in 2005 Mexico City, beating South Africa, Luxembourg, Ireland and Armenia, and was promoted to Division II for 2006.

== Tournament record ==
=== World Championships ===
Year	Host	Result	Pld	W	OTW	OTL	L
2000	(Iceland) Reykjavík	40th place (7th in Group D)	4	2	–	–	2
2001	(Romania) Bucharest	40th place (6th in Division II B)	5	0	–	–	5
2002	Mexico City	42nd place (2nd in Division II Q)	2	0	–	1*	1
2003	(South Korea) Seoul	39th place (6th in Division II A)	5	0	–	–	5
2004	(Iceland) Reykjavík	43rd place (3rd in Division III)	4	2	–	1*	1
2005	Mexico City	41st place (1st in Division III)	4	4	–	–	0
2006	(New Zealand) Auckland	38th place (5th in Division II B)	5	1	–	–	4
2007	(South Korea) Seoul	38th place (5th in Division II B)	4	0	0	0	4
2008	(Australia) Newcastle	35th place (4th in Division II B)	5	2	0	0	3
2009	(Bulgaria) Sofia	37th place (5th in Division II B)	5	1	0	0	4
2010	(Mexico) Naucalpan	37th place (5th in Division II A)	5	1	0	0	4
2011	(Australia) Melbourne	37th place (5th in Division II A)	5	1	0	0	4
2012	(Bulgaria) Sofia	38th place (4th in Division II B)	5	2	0	1	2
2013	(Turkey) İzmit	37th place (3rd in Division II B)	5	3	1	0	1
2014	(Spain) Jaca	36th place (2nd in Division II B)	5	4	0	0	1
2015	(South Africa) Cape Town	37th place (3rd in Division II B)	5	3	0	1	2
2016	Mexico City	36th place (2nd in Division II B)	5	4	0	1	0
2017	(New Zealand) Auckland	39th place (5th in Division II B)	5	1	0	0	4
2018	(Spain) Madrid	39th place (5th in Division II B)	5	1	0	0	4
2019	Mexico City	39th place (5th in Division II B)	5	1	0	1	3
2020 and 2021		Cancelled due to the COVID-19 pandemic					
2022	(Iceland) Reykjavík	36th place (5th in Division II B)	4	0	0	0	4
2023	(Turkey) Istanbul	40th place (6th in Division II B)	5	0	0	0	5
2024	(Kyrgyzstan) Bishkek	46th place (6th in Division III A)	5	0	0	1	4
2025	(Mexico) Queretaro	47th place (1st in Division III B)	5	5	0	0	0
2026	(South Africa) Cape Town	42nd place (2nd in Division III A)	5	2	1	1	1
Total		24/24	117	40	2	8	67

=== Pan American Tournament ===
Year	Host	Result	Pld	W	OTW	OTL	L
2014	Mexico City	2nd place	5	3	0	0	2
2015	Mexico City	2nd place	5	4	0	1	0
2016	Mexico City	2nd place	6	5	0	1	0
2017	Mexico City	1st place	6	6	0	0	0
Total		4/4	22	18	0	2	2

== Head-to-head record ==
Last match update: 3 May 2025

Team	Pld	W	T	L	GF	GA	+/–
Argentina	7	7	0	0	66	4	+62
Armenia	2	2	0	0	65	0	+65
Australia	7	0	0	7	12	60	–48
Belgium	8	0	0	8	10	66	–56
Brazil	3	3	0	0	31	1	+30
Bulgaria	11	5	0	6	57	61	–4
Chile	1	1	0	0	17	0	+17
China	7	2	0	5	22	27	–5
Chinese Taipei	1	0	0	1	1	7	–6
Colombia	6	4	0	2	27	14	+13
Croatia	1	0	0	1	2	9	–7
Estonia	1	0	0	1	3	13	–10
Georgia	2	0	0	2	2	8	–6
Hong Kong	1	1	0	0	5	2	+3
Iceland	5	1	1	3	12	24	–12
Ireland	2	2	0	0	14	4	+10
Israel	11	5	0	6	47	41	+6
Kyrgyzstan	1	0	0	1	4	9	–5
Luxembourg	4	3	0	1	16	7	+9
Mongolia	1	1	0	0	7	6	+1
Netherlands	1	0	0	1	1	17	–16
New Zealand	12	4	1	7	31	47	–16
North Korea	7	3	0	4	26	21	+5
Philippines	1	1	0	0	9	1	+8
Romania	1	0	0	1	0	19	–19
Serbia	4	1	0	3	5	42	–37
Singapore	1	1	0	0	18	1	+17
South Africa	8	5	0	3	25	30	–5
South Korea	4	0	0	4	6	48	–42
Spain	8	1	0	7	17	62	–45
Thailand	1	0	0	1	0	5	–5
Turkey	8	5	0	3	36	20	+16
Turkmenistan	1	0	0	1	4	8	–4
United Arab Emirates	1	0	0	1	4	9	–5
Total	140	58	2	80	602	693	–91
