= Brazil men's national ice hockey team =

Brazil
- Nickname: Yellow Eagles (Águias Amarelas)
- Association: Confederação Brasileira de Desportos no Gelo (CBDG)
- Head coach: Jens Hinderlie
- Assistants: Michael Christian Duc; Alexandre Capelle Jr.
- Most games: Julio Baptista & João Gonçalves (11)
- Most points: Bruno Gomes (22)
- Team colors
- IIHF code: BRA

Ranking
- Current IIHF: NR (3 June 2026)

First international
- Mexico 16–0 Brazil (Mexico City, Mexico; 2 March 2014)

Biggest win
- Brazil 13–0 Argentina (Mexico City, Mexico; 11 June 2017)

Biggest defeat
- Puerto Rico 19–0 Brazil (Canillo, Andorra; April 26, 2025)

Pan American Ice Hockey Tournament
- Appearances: 4 (first in 2014)
- Best result: 3rd (2015)

International record (W–L–T)
- 6–32–1

The Brazilian national ice hockey team (Portuguese: Seleção Brasileira de Hóquei no Gelo) is the national men's ice hockey team of Brazil. The team is controlled by the Brazilian Ice Sports Federation and is an associate member of the International Ice Hockey Federation (IIHF). Brazil is currently not ranked in the IIHF World Ranking and has still not actively competed in any World Championship, but has played in the Pan American Tournament, a regional tournament for lower-tier hockey nations in the Americas.

== History ==
=== Ice hockey in Brazil ===
Brazil joined the IIHF on 26 June 1984. It was the first South American nation to join the IIHF until Argentina joined in 1998 and Chile in 2000. Brazil has still not actively competing in any World Championship in ice hockey, except in inline hockey. There are a number of rinks around the country. The teams that competed for the 2009–10 National Championship are Sociedade Hipica Campinas, Sertãozinho, Amparo NL, Palmeiras, Darks-Guariani, Portuguesa and Capelle Hockey School. Mike Greenlay and Robyn Regehr, who both played in the NHL, were born in Brazil.

=== Participation in IIHF competitions ===
Brazil participated in the 2014 Pan American Ice Hockey Tournament. They played their first international game against the host nation, Mexico, which they lost 16–0. In the following game, Brazil recorded its first international goal in a 5–3 defeat to Argentina.

In the 2015 edition, Brazil recorded its first win in its first game in the tournament, 5–2, against a junior Mexico team.

After beating Argentina “B” (7–0) and losing to Colombia (3–0) and Mexico (11–1), Brazil won its last game by 6–1 against Argentina's main team on 7 June, and reached third place in standings, thus winning the bronze medal, its first in the tournament. | In 2023 the Brasil national ice hockey team established cooperation with Czech team Dukla Jihlava

== International competitions ==
=== Pan American Tournament ===
Year	Host	Result	Pld	W	OW	OL	L
2014	Mexico City	5th place	4	0	0	0	4
2015	Mexico City	3rd place	5	3	0	0	2
2016	Mexico City	4th place	6	2	0	0	4
2017	Mexico City	5th place	6	5	0	0	1

== Roster ==
Last roster update: 6 November 2018

Head coach: (United States) Jens Hinderlie

#	Name	Pos
1	Daniel Hammerle	G
2	Jose Alexandre Guilardi	F
10	Andreas Diego Mindell	F
11	Bruno Gomes	F
12	Yan Graciano	F
14	Luis Roberto Custodio	D
17	Henrique Degani	F
18	Mike de Souza	F
21	Carlos Carnelos	D
24	Raul Bruchet	D
27	Tiago Gomes	D
28	Breno Amaral	F
38	Allen Ruane	G
64	Julio Baptista	F
66	Pedro Roberto Tonietto	G
67	Daniel Baptista	D
81	Thomas Camilo Pierotti	F
88	Sudario Alonso Neto	D
91	Leandro Graciano	F
91	João Reis	D
	Rafael Lindenberg	D

== All-time record against other nations ==
Last match update: 26 April 2025

Team	Pld	W	T	L	GF	GA	+/–
Andorra	1	1	0	0	7	4	+3
Argentina	8	2	0	6	32	53	-21
Chile	3	2	0	1	21	7	+14
Colombia	10	0	1	9	14	64	-50
Greece	3	0	0	3	6	18	-12
Ireland	1	0	0	1	0	16	-16
Jamaica	1	0	0	1	0	7	-7
Liechtenstein	1	0	0	1	2	19	-17
Mexico	3	0	0	3	1	31	-30
Portugal	2	0	0	2	2	16	-14
Puerto Rico	3	0	0	3	3	36	-33
Venezuela	3	1	0	2	16	16	0
Total	39	6	1	32	104	287	-185
