= Lebanese Ice Hockey Federation =

Governing body of ice hockey in Lebanon

Lebanon
- Association name: Lebanese Ice Hockey Federation
- IIHF membership: September 26, 2019
- President: Charles El-Mir

The Lebanese Ice Hockey Federation is the governing body of ice hockey in Lebanon.

== History ==
The federation was accepted into the International Ice Hockey Federation on September 26, 2019. It is an associate member of the IIHF, and therefore has no right to vote in the General Assembly. The current president of the federation is Charles El-Mir.
