= Brazilian Ice Hockey Championship =

Brazilian Championship
- Sport: Ice hockey
- Founded: 2008
- No. of teams: 7 (2010)
- Country: Brazil
- Most recent champion: Sociedade Hípica de Campinas

The Brazilian Championship was the national ice hockey championship in Brazil. It was first contested in 2008 and was held annually through 2010. The competition has not been arranged since then.

== History ==
In 2008, the Hockey Association of the State of São Paulo, where most ice hockey activities in Brazil take place, decided to organize a national championship. Sociedade Hípica de Campinas won every edition of the championship.

== Champions ==
- 2008: Sociedade Hípica de Campinas
- 2009: Sociedade Hípica de Campinas
- 2010: Sociedade Hípica de Campinas
