= Jamaica men's national ice hockey team =

Jamaica
- Association: Jamaican Olympic Ice Hockey Federation
- General manager: Lester Griffin
- Head coach: Anthony Stewart
- Captain: Jaden Lindo
- Most games: Seven players (11)
- Top scorer: Jaden Lindo (13)
- Most points: Carter Thornton (23)
- Team colors
- IIHF code: JAM
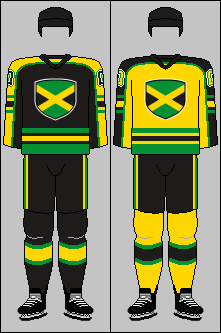

Ranking
- Current IIHF: NR (3 June 2026)

First international
- Jamaica 5–0 Colombia (Coral Springs, United States; 6 September 2019)

Biggest win
- Jamaica 12–0 Colombia (Coral Springs, United States; 14 October 2021); Jamaica 12–0 Venezuela (Coral Springs, United States; 16 October 2021)

Biggest defeat
- Puerto Rico 6–0 Jamaica (Queens, United States; 9 June 2023)

Amerigol LATAM Cup
- Appearances: 1 (first in 2019)
- Best result: 1st (2019)

International record (W–L–T)
- 13–3–0

Medal record

Amerigol LATAM Cup
Gold medal – first place	2019 Coral Springs	Division 1

The Jamaica national ice hockey team is the national men's ice hockey team of Jamaica. They are controlled by the Jamaican Olympic Ice Hockey Federation and became an associate member of the International Ice Hockey Federation (IIHF) since 18 May 2012. Jamaica is currently not ranked in the IIHF World Ranking and has not entered in any IIHF World Championship events. Jamaica made its international debut in the 2019 Amerigol LATAM Cup.

== History ==
Jamaica joined the IIHF on 18 May 2012, becoming the first Caribbean nation to accomplish this. In order to compete at the Winter Olympics, they must have full inclusion from the IIHF, which requires the nation to have at least one ice rink and a development program. Jamaica currently does not possess an ice rink.

Recently they have held tryouts in Canada to form a national team that can compete in the future Winter Olympics, roughly two dozen players were part of the tryouts. Due to the tryouts being held in Canada, some accused the team of attempting to "poach" from Canadian talent. Former NHL player, Graeme Townshend is leading the tryouts in order to construct a national team. The current stated goal of the organization is to have a national team compete in the Winter Olympics within next 20 years.

=== Canadian players of Jamaican-origin ===
There are notable players of Jamaican-origin have played in Canada, the Subban brothers, P. K., Malcolm and Jordan, all of whom were selected in the NHL entry draft in their respective years 2007, 2012 and 2013, with P. K. played for 13 seasons in the NHL with the Montreal Canadiens, the Nashville Predators and the New Jersey Devils, and Malcolm currently playing for the Rochester Americans in the AHL, an affiliate of the Buffalo Sabres. P. K. represented Canada in international competitions, and won the gold medal at the 2014 Winter Olympics in Sochi, Russia. Anthony and Chris Stewart and Josh Ho-Sang who also played in the NHL, with Ho-Sang playing for the Salavat Yulaev Ufa in the KHL. Graeme Townshend became the first Jamaican-born player to play in the NHL, and played for two seasons with the early 1990s Boston Bruins, the New York Islanders and for one season with the Ottawa Senators. Townshend was born in Kingston. Jermaine Loewen played for five seasons in the Canadian major junior hockey league, the Western Hockey League (WHL), with the Kamloops Blazers, was selected in the seventh round (199th overall) by the Dallas Stars in the 2018 draft, and became the first Jamaican-born player to be selected in the draft. Loewen was born in Mandeville. On 29 October 2021, Isaak Phillips made his NHL debut, becoming the first Jamaica national team player to debut in the National Hockey League.

=== National team ===
On 6 September 2019, Jamaica played its first international game against other national team at the Amerigol LATAM Cup in Coral Springs, Florida, United States. They defeated Colombia 5–0 and later defeated Argentina 8–4. Jamaica went on to win the Amerigol LATAM Cup after a 3–2 win in a shootout over the defending champion Colombia.

== Tournament record ==
=== Olympic Games ===
Year	Host	Result	Pld	W	OTW	OTL	L
1920 through 2010		Not an IIHF member					
2014 through 2022		did not participate					
Total		0/0	–	–	–	–	–

=== World Championship ===
Year	Host	Result	Pld	W	OTW	OTL	L
1930 through 2011		Not an IIHF member					
2012 through 2023		did not enter					
Total		0/0	–	–	–	–	–

=== Amerigol LATAM Cup ===
Year	Host	Result	Pld	W	OTW	OTL	L
2019	(United States) Coral Springs	1st place (Division 1)	5	4	1	0	0
2020	(United States) Coral Springs	Cancelled due to the COVID-19 pandemic					
2021	(United States) Coral Springs	Played 6 friendly matches against other national teams					
2022	(United States) Coral Springs	did not participate					
2023	(United States) Coral Springs	did not participate					
Total		1/5	5	4	1	0	0

=== Challenger Series ===
Year	Host	Result	Pld	W	OTW	OTL	L
2024	(United States) Chicago, Illinois & Dix Hills, New York	1st place	8	5	0	0	3
2025
Total		1/1	8	5	0	0	3

== Fixtures and results ==
Against other national teams
Opponent	Date	Score	Scores by period	Tournament	Host venue
Lebanon	18 April 2024	6–11	No information	Challenger Series	Fifth Third Arena, Chicago, Illinois
Puerto Rico	19 April 2024	6–3	No information	Challenger Series	Fifth Third Arena, Chicago, Illinois
Lebanon	20 April 2024	7–6	No information	Challenger Series	Fifth Third Arena, Chicago, Illinois
Puerto Rico	21 April 2024	5–4	No information	Challenger Series	Fifth Third Arena, Chicago, Illinois
Puerto Rico	7 June 2024	11–2	No information	Challenger Series	Clark Gillies Arena, Dix Hills, New York
Lebanon	7 June 2024	4–6	No information	Challenger Series	Clark Gillies Arena, Dix Hills, New York
Puerto Rico	8 June 2024	5–7	No information	Challenger Series	Clark Gillies Arena, Dix Hills, New York
Lebanon	9 June 2024	8–4	No information	Challenger Series	Clark Gillies Arena, Dix Hills, New York
Lebanon	13 July 2024	12–8	No information	Challenger Series	
Win Loss

== All-time record against other national teams ==
Last match update: 9 May 2026

Key
Positive balance (more Wins)
Neutral balance (Wins = Losses)
Negative balance (more Losses)

Team	GP	W	T	L	GF	GA
Argentina	2	2	0	0	20	5
Brazil	1	1	0	0	7	0
Colombia	3	3	0	0	20	2
Lebanon	9	5	0	4	57	56
Puerto Rico	11	6	0	5	63	50
Venezuela	1	1	0	0	12	0
Total	27	18	0	9	179	113
