= Venezuela men's national ice hockey team =

Men's national ice hockey team representing Venezuela

Venezuela
- Association: Asociación Venezolana de Hockey en Línea y en Hielo
- Head coach: Pete Kamman
- Captain: Juan de Dios Singer
- Most games: Daniel Sosa (14)
- Top scorer: Daniel Sosa (17)
- Most points: Daniel Sosa (31)
- Team colors
- IIHF code: VEN

First international
- Colombia 10–1 Venezuela (Coral Springs, United States; 9 November 2018)

Biggest win
- Venezuela 8–3 Brazil (Dallas, United States; 24 March 2022)

Biggest defeat
- Colombia 12–0 Jamaica (Coral Springs, United States; 16 October 2021)

Amerigol LATAM Cup
- Appearances: 4 (first in 2018)
- Best result: 4th (2018, 2019)

International record (W–L–T)
- 4–11–0

The Venezuela national ice hockey team (Spanish: Selección de hockey sobre hielo de Venezuela) is the national men's ice hockey team of Venezuela. It is controlled by the Venezuelan Ice and Inline Hockey Association, the governing body that oversees both ice and inline hockey in the country. Venezuela is not a member of the IIHF and therefore not eligible to enter any IIHF World Championship events.

== History ==
There are only two notable players who were born in Venezuela are Rick Chartraw and Don Spring, who both played in the NHL. Chartraw played in the NHL for ten seasons between 1974 and 1984, most notably winning four Stanley Cups in a row with the Montreal Canadiens between 1976 and 1979, and one with the Edmonton Oilers in 1984, while Spring played for four seasons with the Winnipeg Jets between 1980 and 1984. Chartraw represented the United States at the 1976 Canada Cup, while Spring represented Canada at the 1980 Winter Olympics.

Venezuela made its debut in international competition in 2018 at the Amerigol LATAM Cup, sanctioned by the Amerigol International Hockey Association, which took place in Coral Springs, Florida, United States. The team played its first official game against Colombia on 9 November, falling to them 12–1. After an 0–3 start, they played their fourth game on 10 November and went on to win 5–3 against Brazil, eliminating them in the preliminary round and advancing to the Amerigol LATAM Cup semi-finals. The team again played against Colombia on 11 November, but they were shut out by 13–0, finishing in fourth place as the semi-finalist.

In the 2019 Amerigol LATAM Cup, the team won 8–4 against Chile and later won 5–3 against the Mexico Selects team. In the semi-finals, they lost 7–4 to Colombia, and later in the bronze medal game, lost 3–2 to the Mexico Selects team, finishing in fourth place for the second straight year.

== Tournament record ==
=== Amerigol LATAM Cup ===
Year	Host	Result	Pld	W	OTW	OTL	L
2018	(United States) Coral Springs	4th place	5	1	0	0	4
2019	(United States) Coral Springs	4th place (Division I)	4	2	0	0	2
2020	(United States) Coral Springs	Cancelled due to the COVID-19 pandemic					
2021	(United States) Coral Springs	6th place (Division I)	4	1	0	0	3
2022	(United States) Coral Springs	9th place (Division II)	4	2	0	0	2
2023	(United States) Coral Springs	To be determined (Division II)	0	0	0	0	0
Total		5/6	17	6	0	0	11

== Fixtures and results ==
Against other national teams
Opponent	Date	Score	Scores by period	Tournament	Host venue
Chile	24 August 2023	TBD	–, –, –	Amerigol LATAM Cup – Division II	Florida Panthers IceDen, Coral Springs
Against club and other teams
Opponent	Date	Score	Scores by period	Tournament	Host venue
Mexico Warriors B	23 August 2023	TBD	–, –, –	Amerigol LATAM Cup – Division II	Florida Panthers IceDen, Coral Springs
Argentina B	25 August 2023	TBD	–, –, –	Amerigol LATAM Cup – Division II	Florida Panthers IceDen, Coral Springs
Win Loss

== All-time record against other national teams ==
Last match update: 22 August 2025

Key
Positive balance (more Wins)
Neutral balance (Wins = Losses)
Negative balance (more Losses)

Team	GP	W	T	L	GF	GA
Algeria	1	0	0	1	2	8
Argentina	4	0	0	4	12	39
Brazil	5	3	0	2	21	30
Chile	3	2	0	1	14	9
Colombia	5	1	0	4	11	40
Falkland Islands	1	1	0	0	5	3
Jamaica	1	0	0	1	0	12
Lebanon	1	0	0	1	2	7
Puerto Rico	1	0	0	1	1	5
Total	22	7	0	15	68	148
