= Argentina women's national ice hockey team =

Argentina
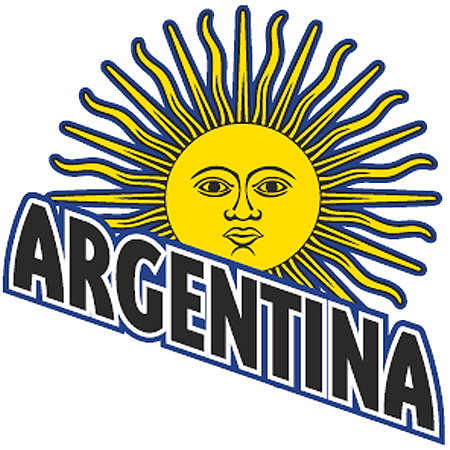
- Association: Asociación Argentina de Hockey sobre Hielo y en Línea
- Team colors
- IIHF code: ARG

First international
- Argentina 1–0 Mexico (Cuautitlán Izcalli, Mexico; 18 February 2012)

Biggest win
- Argentina 14–0 Brazil (Mexico City, Mexico; 5 June 2017); Argentina 14–0 Brazil (Coral Springs, United States; 17 September 2019)

Biggest defeat
- Mexico 14–0 Argentina (Mexico City, Mexico; 7 June 2015)

Pan American Women's Ice Hockey Tournament
- Appearances: 2 (first in 2016)
- Best result: (silver) (2016)

International record (W–L–T)
- 9–16–0

The Argentine women's national ice hockey team (Spanish: Selección femenina de hockey sobre hielo de Argentina) is the national women's ice hockey team of Argentina. They are controlled by the Argentine Association of Ice and In-Line Hockey, an associate member of the International Ice Hockey Federation (IIHF).

== History ==
The Argentina women's national ice hockey team played its first game in February 2012 against Mexico in an exhibition game being held in Cuautitlán Izcalli, Mexico. Argentina won the game 1–0. The following day they played their second of two exhibition matches against the Mexican women's national team in Lerma, Mexico, which they lost 1–7. The team is controlled by the Argentine Association of Ice and In-Line Hockey. Argentina won the silver medal at the 2016 Pan American Women's Ice Hockey Tournament.

== All-time record against other nations ==
As of 12 June 2016

Team	GP	W	T	L	GF	GA
Colombia	2	0	0	2	2	8
Mexico	5	1	0	4	2	32

== See also ==
- Argentina women's national field hockey team (Las Leonas)
- Argentina men's national field hockey team
- Argentina men's national ice hockey team
