= 2017 Pan American Ice Hockey Tournament =

Tournament details
- Host country: Mexico
- Venue: 1 (in 1 host city)
- Dates: 5–11 June
- Teams: 9 (from 5 countries)

Final positions
- Champions: Mexico (1st title)
- Runners-up: Colombia
- Third place: Argentina

Tournament statistics
- Games played: 27
- Goals scored: 214 (7.93 per game)
- Scoring leader: (Argentina) Owen Haiek (18 points)

The 2017 Pan American Ice Hockey Tournament was the fourth edition of the Pan American Ice Hockey Tournament, an annual event run by the Federación Deportiva de México de Hockey sobre Hielo, sanctioned by the International Ice Hockey Federation. It will take place in Mexico City, Mexico between June 5 and 11, 2017. Mexico "A" won their first ever Pan American Tournament, winning all six of its games and defeating Colombia (Yellow) in the final. Argentina "A" finished third after defeating Mexico "B" in the bronze medal game.

== Participants ==
The following nine teams in three groups will compete in the tournament, with Argentina, Brazil, Colombia and Mexico bringing both "A" and "B" teams.

=== Group A ===
- Argentina "B"
- Brazil "B"
- Colombia (Yellow)

=== Group B ===
- Argentina "A"
- Chile
- Mexico "A" (host)

=== Group C ===
- Brazil "A"
- Colombia (Red)
- Mexico "B" (host)

== First round ==
=== Standings ===
==== Group A ====
Pos	Team	Pld	W	OTW	OTL	L	GF	GA	GD	Pts
1	Colombia (Yellow)	2	2	0	0	0	19	1	+18	6
2	Argentina "B"	2	1	0	0	1	7	9	−2	3
3	Brazil "B"	2	0	0	0	2	1	17	−16	0

==== Group B ====
Pos	Team	Pld	W	OTW	OTL	L	GF	GA	GD	Pts
1	Mexico "A"	2	2	0	0	0	22	0	+22	6
2	Argentina "A"	2	1	0	0	1	26	5	+21	3
3	Chile	2	0	0	0	2	0	43	−43	0

==== Group C ====
Pos	Team	Pld	W	OTW	OTL	L	GF	GA	GD	Pts
1	Mexico "B"	2	2	0	0	0	9	1	+8	6
2	Brazil "A"	2	1	0	0	1	5	3	+2	3
3	Colombia (Red)	2	0	0	0	2	1	11	−10	0

=== Rankings ===
Winner of Group
Wild Card
5th–9th place

Rk	Team	Group	+/–	Pts
1	Mexico "A"	B	+22	6
2	Colombia (Yellow)	A	+18	6
3	Mexico "B"	C	+8	6
4	Argentina "A"	B	+21	3
5	Brazil "A"	C	+2	3
6	Argentina "B"	A	–2	3
7	Colombia (Red)	C	–10	0
8	Brazil "B"	A	–16	0
9	Chile	B	–43	0

=== Schedules ===
(UTC–06:00)

==== Group A ====
June 5, 2017; 12:30	Colombia (Yellow)	11 – 0	Brazil "B"	Icedome, Mexico City

June 6, 2017; 10:30	Argentina "B"	6 – 1	Brazil "B"	Icedome, Mexico City

June 7, 2017; 12:30	Colombia (Yellow)	8 – 1	Argentina "B"	Icedome, Mexico City

==== Group B ====
June 5, 2017; 09:30	Argentina "A"	26 – 0	Chile	Icedome, Mexico City

June 6, 2017; 23:00	Mexico "A"	17 – 0	Chile	Icedome, Mexico City

June 7, 2017; 23:00	Argentina "A"	0 – 5	Mexico "A"	Icedome, Mexico City

==== Group C ====
June 5, 2017; 23:00	Mexico "B"	7 – 0	Colombia (Red)	Icedome, Mexico City

June 6, 2017; 21:30	Mexico "B"	2 – 1	Brazil "A"	Icedome, Mexico City

June 7, 2017; 11:00	Brazil "A"	4 – 1	Colombia (Red)	Icedome, Mexico City

== Second round ==
=== Standings ===
Pos	Team	Pld	W	OTW	OTL	L	GF	GA	GD	Pts
1	Mexico "A"	3	3	0	0	0	21	1	+20	9
2	Colombia (Yellow)	3	2	0	0	1	9	3	+6	6
3	Mexico "B"	3	1	0	0	2	2	17	−15	3
4	Argentina "A"	3	0	0	0	3	2	13	−11	0

==== 5th–9th place ====
Pos	Team	Pld	W	OTW	OTL	L	GF	GA	GD	Pts
5	Brazil "A"	4	4	0	0	0	45	0	+45	12
6	Colombia (Red)	4	3	0	0	1	18	8	+10	9
7	Chile	4	2	0	0	2	10	18	−8	6
8	Brazil "B"	4	1	0	0	3	4	31	−27	3
9	Argentina "B"	4	0	0	0	4	5	25	−20	0

=== Schedules ===
(UTC–06:00)

June 8, 2017	Brazil "B"	0 – 6	Chile	Icedome, Mexico City

June 8, 2017	Colombia (Yellow)	6 – 0	Mexico "B"	Icedome, Mexico City

June 8, 2017	Argentina "B"	3 – 4	Chile	Icedome, Mexico City

June 8, 2017	Brazil "A"	7 – 0	Colombia (Red)	Icedome, Mexico City

June 8, 2017	Mexico "A"	9 – 0	Argentina "A"	Icedome, Mexico City

June 9, 2017	Argentina "B"	0 – 5	Colombia (Red)	Icedome, Mexico City

June 9, 2017	Brazil "A"	16 – 0	Brazil "B"	Icedome, Mexico City

June 9, 2017	Colombia (Red)	6 – 0	Chile	Icedome, Mexico City

June 9, 2017	Argentina "B"	2 – 3	Brazil "B"	Icedome, Mexico City

June 9, 2017	Mexico "B"	2 – 1	Argentina "A"	Icedome, Mexico City

June 9, 2017	Colombia (Yellow)	1 – 2	Mexico "A"	Icedome, Mexico City

June 10, 2017	Mexico "A"	10 – 0	Mexico "B"	Icedome, Mexico City

June 10, 2017	Colombia (Yellow)	2 – 1	Argentina "A"	Icedome, Mexico City

June 10, 2017	Brazil "A"	9 – 0	Chile	Icedome, Mexico City

June 11, 2017	Colombia (Red)	7 – 1	Brazil "B"	Icedome, Mexico City

June 11, 2017	Brazil "A"	13 – 0	Argentina "B"	Icedome, Mexico City

== Final round ==
=== Bronze medal game ===
(UTC–06:00)

June 11, 2017	Mexico "B"	1 – 6	Argentina "A"	Icedome, Mexico City

=== Final ===
(UTC–06:00)

June 11, 2017	Mexico "A"	1 – 0	Colombia (Yellow)	Icedome, Mexico City

== Final standings ==
2017 Pan American Ice Hockey Tournament

Mexico "A"
1st title

Rk	Team
1st place, gold medalist(s)	Mexico "A"
2nd place, silver medalist(s)	Colombia (Yellow)
3rd place, bronze medalist(s)	Argentina "A"
4	Mexico "B"
5	Brazil "A"
6	Colombia (Red)
7	Chile
8	Brazil "B"
9	Argentina "B"
