= Argentina men's national ice hockey team =

Men's national ice hockey team representing Argentina

Argentina
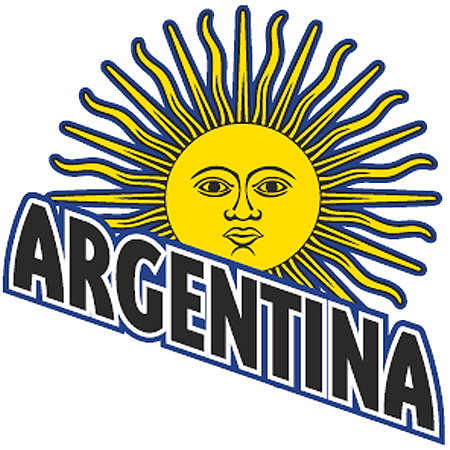
- Association: Asociación Argentina de Hockey sobre Hielo y en Línea
- Head coach: Dicky Haiek
- Assistants: Ramon Arana
- Most games: Pedro Baeza (55)
- Top scorer: Matias Weir (54)
- Most points: Owen Haiek (117)
- Team colors
- IIHF code: ARG
colours	colours

Ranking
- Current IIHF: NR (3 June 2026)

First international
- Mexico 5–1 Argentina (Cuautitlán Izcalli, Mexico; 18 February 2012)

Biggest win
- Argentina 26–0 Chile (Mexico City, Mexico; 5 June 2017)

Biggest defeat
- Jamaica 12–1 Argentina (Coral Springs, United States; 16 October 2021)

IIHF Development Cup
- Appearances: 2 (first in 2023)
- Best result: 2nd (2023)

Pan American Tournament
- Appearances: 4 (first in 2014)
- Best result: 3rd (2017)

Amerigol LATAM Cup
- Appearances: 5 (first in 2018)
- Best result: 1st (2023)

International record (W–L–T)
- 17–13–0

Medal record

Amerigol LATAM Cup
Gold medal – first place	2023 Coral Springs	Division 1

IIHF Development Cup
Silver medal – second place	2023 Bratislava	

Pan American Tournament
Bronze medal – third place	2017 Mexico City	

The Argentina national ice hockey team (Spanish: Selección de hockey sobre hielo de Argentina) is the national men's ice hockey team of Argentina. The team is controlled by the Argentine Association of Ice and In-Line Hockey (AAHHL) and has been an associate member of the International Ice Hockey Federation (IIHF) since 31 May 1998. Argentina is currently not ranked in the IIHF World Ranking and has not entered in any IIHF World Championship events, but they have played in the Amerigol LATAM Cup since 2018, a tournament for teams mostly from Latin America and the Caribbean.

== History ==
Argentina played its first game in February 2012 against Mexico in a friendly match in Cuautitlán Izcalli, Mexico. Argentina lost the game 1–5. The following day, they played their second friendly match against Mexico and suffered a wider loss of 1–10.

=== Pan American Ice Hockey Tournament ===
Argentina has participated in all four editions of the Pan American Ice Hockey Tournament.

In the 2014 Pan American Ice Hockey Tournament, they recorded their first ever victory, defeating Brazil by a score of 5–3. They finished fourth after losing to Colombia in the bronze medal game, 9–1.

After disappointing performances in the 2015 and 2016 tournaments, in which the team finished near last place both times, Argentina obtained its first ever international ice hockey medal in the 2017 tournament. Argentina recorded the tournament's biggest ever win with a 26–0 score against Chile, before defeating Mexico's U23 squad 6–1 in the bronze medal match.

=== Amerigol competition ===
==== Amerigol LATAM Cup ====
While the LATAM Cup is the only annual competition for Argentina, it is not an IIHF-sanctioned tournament, and therefore does not count towards Argentina's official international record.

In 2018, 2019 and 2021, Argentina participated in the LATAM Cup tournament hosted by the Amerigol International Hockey Association. Due to the COVID-19 pandemic, there was no 2020 edition of the tournament. The event is hosted at the Florida Panthers Ice Den in Coral Springs, Florida.

Argentina won against Brazil, Venezuela, and Mexico, before a semi-final elimination in 2018 and quarter-final eliminations in both 2019 and 2021. In the 2021 edition, Argentina was eliminated in double overtime by the eventual champions, Colombia.

2023 version of the LATAM cup was played again in Coral Springs, Florida at the Florida Panthers Ice Den and for the first time the Argentina Men's Division 1 team captured GOLD placing 1st overall. Argentina went 5–0 through the whole tournament (wins against Greece 2x, Mexico & Lebanon 2x) and capped it off with a Double OverTime game-winning goal by Captain Owen Haiek.

==== 2022 Amerigol LATAM Spring Classic ====
In March 2022, Argentina won their first ever championship in ice hockey national team competition at the 2022 Amerigol LATAM Spring Classic in Farmers Branch, Texas, a suburb of Dallas. Argentina was undefeated in this tournament. In the group phase, the team defeated Venezuela (11–3), recorded their first ever victory against Colombia (8–3), defeated Puerto Rico (4–2), and defeated Brazil (10–6). In the semi-finals, Argentina again defeated Venezuela (10–3), before winning the championship against Puerto Rico by a score of 6–3. The title win received significant mainstream press coverage in Argentina.

== Tournament record ==
=== Pan American Tournament ===
Year	Host	Result	Pld	W	OTW	OTL	L
2014	Mexico City	4th place	4	1	0	0	3
2015	Mexico City	5th place	5	1	0	0	4
2016	Mexico City	5th place	5	1	0	0	4
2017	Mexico City	3rd place	6	2	0	0	4
Total		4/4	20	5	0	0	15

=== Amerigol LATAM Cup ===
LATAM CUP 2022 Dallas
Gold Medal
1st Place

LATAM CUP 2022 Miami
Silver Medal
2nd Place

LATAM CUP 2023 Miami
Gold Medal
1st Place

LATAM CUP 2025 Miami

D1 - Silver Medal Second Place

D2 - 14th Place

=== IIHF Development Cup ===
Year	Host	Result	Pld	W	OTW	OTL	L
2017 through 2022		did not participate					
2023	(Slovakia) Bratislava	2nd place	4	3	0	0	1
Total		1/4	4	3	0	0	1

== Roster ==
Last roster update: December 23, 2025

Head Coach: (Argentina) Dicky Haiek

Assistant Coach: Ramon Arana

Name	Pos
Rafael Martell	G
Christian Freer	G
Brody Lim	G
Copello Augusto	G
Michael Rozenblat	F
Owen Haiek	C
Kevin Garcia	C
Benjamin Chubbs	C
Nicolas Grabenheimer	LW
Julian Baumann	F
Matias Perez Pastorino	F
Daniel Ioannou	RW
Mati Weir	RW
Ethan Lim	RW
Mateo Rampoldi	F
John Dorio	D
Victor Beraja	F
Agustin Ernesto Marengo	F
Juan Mandayo	D
Matias Pizzini	D
Tomas Abrate	D
Mariano Gonzalez Leoni	D
Neil Sosa	D
Ronald Sosa	D
Andrew Ioakim	D
Federico Dolan	F
Marcus Barber	D
Josh Miller	F
Yuli Lima	D
Daniel Gonzalez del Solar	D
Leandro Zahr	D
Michael Pizzini	F
Gabriel Dorra	D
Michael DiBattista	D
Nico Piccone	F
Guido Luciano Belli	F
Alex Dorra	F
Manuel Dirube	D
Santino Zuretti	D
Alan Perez	F
Maximilian Olguin	F
Kevin Garcia	F
Emiliano Jesus Bahl	F
Liam Lutteral	F

== All-time record against other national teams ==
Last match update: 23 August 2025

Team	GP	W	T	L	GF	GA	Dif
Brazil	8	6	0	2	53	32	+21
Chile	1	1	0	0	26	0	+26
Colombia	18	5	1	12	80	101	−21
Greece	1	1	0	0	11	4	+7
Ireland	2	1	0	1	15	13	+2
Jamaica	2	0	0	2	5	10	−5
Liechtenstein	1	0	0	1	5	6	−1
Mexico	7	0	0	7	4	66	−62
Portugal	2	1	0	1	14	10	+4
Puerto Rico	10	6	1	3	50	34	+16
Venezuela	4	4	0	0	39	12	+27
Total	56	25	2	29	302	298	+4

== See also ==
- Argentina men's national field hockey team (Los Leones)
- Argentina women's national field hockey team (Las Leonas)
- Argentina women's national ice hockey team
