= André Mattsson =

Swedish ice hockey player

- Born: August 11, 1980 (age 45) Port-au-Prince, Haiti
- Height: 6 ft 0 in (183 cm)
- Weight: 205 lb (93 kg; 14 st 9 lb)
- Position: Defence
- Shot: Left
- Played for: Norrtälje IK; AIK; Lidingö Vikings; IFK Kumla; Bodens IK; Skellefteå AIK; Djurgårdens IF; Malmö Redhawks; GET-ligaen; IK Comet; EPIHL; Manchester Phoenix
- Playing career: 1996–2010

André Mattsson (born August 11, 1980) is a retired Haitian-born Swedish ice hockey defenceman. He played for the Norrtälje IK, AIK, Lidingö Vikings, IFK Kumla, Bodens IK, Skellefteå AIK, Djurgårdens IF and Malmö Redhawks of several Swedish leagues (Swedish Hockey League, HockeyAllsvenskan and Division 2), IK Comet of the Norwegian top-level league, the GET-ligaen, and the Manchester Phoenix of the English Premier League.

== Career statistics ==
			Regular season					Playoffs
Season	Team	League	GP	G	A	Pts	PIM	GP	G	A	Pts	PIM
1996–97	Norrtälje IK	Division 2	30	0	5	5	—	—	—	—	—	—
1997–98	AIK IF J20	J20 SuperElit	27	1	1	2	6	—	—	—	—	—
1998–99	AIK IF J20	J20 SuperElit	23	2	3	5	14	—	—	—	—	—
1998–99	AIK IF	Elitserien	3	0	0	0	4	—	—	—	—	—
1999–00	AIK IF J20	J20 SuperElit	17	0	1	1	28	—	—	—	—	—
1999–00	AIK IF	Elitserien	12	0	0	0	4	—	—	—	—	—
1999–00	Lidingö HC	Allsvenskan	21	2	5	7	18	—	—	—	—	—
2000–01	AIK IF	Elitserien	18	0	1	1	2	2	0	0	0	2
2000–01	IFK Kumla	Allsvenskan	23	3	5	8	45	—	—	—	—	—
2001–02	AIK IF J20	J20 SuperElit	5	1	0	1	6	—	—	—	—	—
2001–02	AIK IF	Elitserien	26	0	2	2	10	—	—	—	—	—
2001–02	Bodens IK	Allsvenskan	9	2	1	3	4	—	—	—	—	—
2002–03	AIK IF	Allsvenskan	39	1	4	5	53	10	0	1	1	6
2003–04	AIK IF J20	J20 SuperElit	1	0	0	0	2	—	—	—	—	—
2003–04	AIK IF	Allsvenskan	45	1	2	3	79	10	0	0	0	12
2004–05	Skellefteå AIK	Allsvenskan	46	3	7	10	24	10	0	0	0	6
2005–06	Djurgårdens IF	Elitserien	49	0	0	0	69	—	—	—	—	—
2006–07	Comet Halden	Norway	37	0	7	7	92	—	—	—	—	—
2007–08	Comet Halden	Norway	43	3	5	8	58	—	—	—	—	—
2008–09	Malmö Redhawks	HockeyAllsvenskan	8	0	1	1	8	—	—	—	—	—
2008–09	Comet Halden	Norway	17	3	4	7	32	—	—	—	—	—
2009–10	Manchester Phoenix	EPIHL	54	13	25	38	58	2	0	0	0	25
Elitserien totals			108	0	3	3	89	2	0	0	0	2
Allsvenskan totals			183	12	24	36	223	30	0	1	1	24
Norway totals			97	6	16	22	182	—	—	—	—	—
