= Chile men's national ice hockey team =

Chile
- Nickname: La Roja sobre Hielo (The Red One on Ice)
- Association: Federación Chilena de Hockey en Línea y en Hielo
- Manager: Monica Arias
- Team colors
- IIHF code: CHI
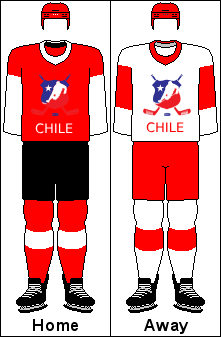

Ranking
- Current IIHF: NR (26 May 2025)

First international
- Argentina 26–0 Chile (Mexico City, Mexico; 5 June 2017)

Biggest win
- Chile 13–1 Colombia (Coral Springs, United States; 22 August 2024)

Biggest defeat
- Argentina 26–0 Chile (Mexico City, Mexico; 5 June 2017)

The Chile national ice hockey team (Spanish: Selección de hockey sobre hielo de Chile) is the national men's ice hockey team of Chile and is controlled by the Chilean Ice and Inline Hockey Federation. Chile is currently not ranked in the IIHF World Ranking and has not entered in any IIHF World Championship events.

== History ==
The Chilean Ice and Inline Hockey Federation, known in Spanish as the Federación Chilena de Hockey en Línea y en Hielo (FCHLH), was founded and joined the IIHF in 2000. Chile became the third South American nation to join the IIHF after Brazil and Argentina. Chile is currently an IIHF affiliate member, and therefore not recognized for ice hockey, just inline hockey. There are three ice rinks in Chile (Santiago, Puerto Montt, and Punta Arenas).

Chile made its debut in international ice hockey competition at the 2017 Pan American Tournament, which was held in Mexico City, Mexico between 5 and 11 June 2017. The first game on 5 June 2017 was a defeat to Argentina "A" 26–0. The second game came against the would-be champions of the tournament, Mexico "A", losing 17–0. The third game created a number of milestones for the Chilean team. The first goal in country history, and eventual game-winner was scored by the Chilean captain, Carlos Valdebenito Jr., who scored 3 goals and adding 2 assists totaling 5 points, also making it the current most points in the game record in the 6–0 victory over Brazil "B". However, the team's win over a club or "B" team was unofficial, and therefore does not count towards Chile's official international record. Chilean goalkeeper, Leonidas Aceitón, recorded his first shutout. Unfortunately, they suffered several injuries in the first three games of the tournament and having traveled with only eight skaters and one goalie, Chile was given permission by the tournament organizers to use players from other countries. Players from Mexico and Brazil joined the squad in the fourth game onwards. The fourth game was a hard-fought 4–3 victory over Argentina "B". The fifth game turned in a 6–0 loss to Colombia (Red). The sixth and final game was played on 11 June, a 9–0 defeat to Brazil "A". In the end, they finished 7th place with a record of 2–4.

On 6 September 2019, Chile played at the Amerigol LATAM Cup, sanctioned by the AmeriGol International Hockey Association, in Coral Springs, Florida, United States. This marks the second tournament appearance (first Amerigol LATAM Cup appearance) for the Chilean squad. Both times skating in Division I. Tournament record stands 0–3. They were defeated by Venezuela 8–4. Two games were played on 7 September. First, a 12–2 loss to the Mexico Selects team, followed by an 11–2 quarter-final loss to Colombia.

Chile also participated in the Amerigol Cup obtaining Silver on U16 and Adults Div 2 on the past years.

== Tournament record ==
=== Pan American Tournament ===
Year	Host	Result	Pld	W	OTW	OTL	L
2017	Mexico City	7th place	6	2	0	0	4
Total		1/1	6	2	0	0	4

=== Amerigol LATAM Cup ===
Year	Host	Result	Pld	W	T	L
2019	(United States) Coral Springs	6th place (Division 1)	3	0	0	3
2020	(United States) Coral Springs	Cancelled due to the COVID-19 pandemic				
2021	(United States) Coral Springs	6th place (Division 2)	4	1	1	2
2022	(United States) Coral Springs	3rd place (Division 2)	4	3	0	1
Total		3/4	11	4	1	6

== Roster ==
Roster for the 2022 Amerigol LATAM Cup.

#	Name	Pos	GP	G	A	Pts
2	Camilo Gaez	F	4	3	3	6
3	Nicholas Ceicko-Opazo	D	4	0	1	1
5	Nikolas Zúñiga	D	4	1	1	2
9	Kevin Palma	F	4	1	5	6
11	Nicolás Correa	F	4	4	1	5
12	George Galaz	D	4	0	1	1
20	Ricardo Clavijo	D	4	1	0	1
26	Carlos Valdebenito Jr.	F	4	1	2	3
29	Nicholas Artiaga-Tapia	D	4	0	2	2
33	Eduardo Ronc	F	4	0	1	1
34	Leonidas Aceiton	G	4	0	0	0
39	Alexis González	G	0	0	0	0
43	Hernán Céspedes	F	4	0	0	0
52	Camilo Moreno	F	4	3	2	5
81	Edward Stefaniak	D	4	0	0	0
88	Cristóbal Vega	D	4	0	0	0
91	Matías Araya	F	4	1	3	4
95	Gaston Araya	F	4	6	2	8

Legend: +A, Alternate Captain; +C, Captain

== See also ==
- Chile national inline hockey team
