= Brazilian Ice Sports Federation =

Ice sports governing body of Brazil

Brazil
- Association name: Confederação Brasileira de Desportos no Gelo
- IIHF Code: BRA
- IIHF membership: June 26, 1984
- President: Matheus Figueiredo

The Brazilian Ice Sports Federation (Portuguese: Confederação Brasileira de Desportos no Gelo, CBDG) was founded by Eric Maleson, Brazil's first bobsled athlete. The CBDG was established in 1996 and affiliated to the Brazilian Olympic Committee in 1999. The federation qualified 7 athletes for the 2002 Winter Olympics in Salt Lake City, Utah (5 bobsled athletes and 2 luge athletes) and a 4-man bobsled team for the 2006 Winter Olympics in Torino.

The federation is responsible for the development of all winter Olympic ice sport modalities for Brazil including bobsled, skeleton, luge, figure, long track and short track speed skating, curling, and ice hockey.

== Curling ==
The Brazilian Ice Sports Federation made curling history in August 2008 when they challenged the United States for a berth at the World Curling Championship. This was the first time any South American team has offered a challenge to the United States for a berth in the World Curling Championship. The players involved trained in Lennoxville, Quebec and included Luis Silva, Marcelo De Mello, Celso Kossaka and Cesar Santos. See 2009 USA-Brazil Challenge. The Brazilian team were unsuccessful, losing the challenge 3 games to none.

== National teams ==
- Men's national team
- National inline hockey team

=== Participation by year ===
2017

Event	Division	Host nation	Date	Result
Inline	Div. I	Slovakia	24 June–2 July 2017	8th place (16th overall)
Pan American		Mexico	5–11 June 2017	5th place
