= Colombia men's national ice hockey team =

Colombia
- Association: Federación Colombiana de Hockey Sobre Hielo
- Head coach: Sam Uisprapassorn
- Assistants: Rich Garvey
- Most games: Julio Lemoine (53)
- Top scorer: Kevin Medina (46)
- Most points: Kevin Medina (88)
- Team colors
- IIHF code: COL

Ranking
- Current IIHF: NR (3 June 2026)

First international
- Colombia 11–1 Argentina (Mexico City, Mexico; 2 March 2014)

Biggest win
- Colombia 14–0 Brazil (Mexico City, Mexico; 8 March 2014)

Biggest defeat
- Argentina 15–4 Colombia (Henderson, United States; 22 March 2025)

IIHF Development Cup
- Appearances: 3 (first in 2022)
- Best result: 1st (2022)

Pan American Ice Hockey Tournament
- Appearances: 4 (first in 2014)
- Best result: 1st (2015, 2016)

Amerigol LATAM Cup
- Appearances: 3 (first in 2018)
- Best result: 1st (2018, 2021)

Amerigol LATAM Cup Spring Classic
- Appearances: 1 (first in 2022)
- Best result: Semifinal loss (2022)

International record (W–L–T)
- 38–19–2

Medal record

Pan American Tournament
Gold medal – first place	2015 Mexico City, Mexico	
Gold medal – first place	2016 Mexico City, Mexico	
Silver medal – second place	2017 Mexico City, Mexico	
Bronze medal – third place	2014 Mexico City, Mexico	

Amerigol LATAM Cup
Gold medal – first place	2018 Coral Springs, USA	Division I
Gold medal – first place	2021 Coral Springs, USA	Division I
Silver medal – second place	2019 Coral Springs, USA	Division I

IIHF Development Cup
Gold medal – first place	2022 Füssen, Germany	
Bronze medal – third place	2023 Bratislava, Slovakia	
Bronze medal – third place	2024 Bratislava, Slovakia	

The Colombia national ice hockey team (Spanish: Selección de hockey sobre hielo de Colombia) is the national men's ice hockey team of Colombia, is controlled by the Colombian Ice Hockey Federation, and on 26 September 2019, became an associate member of the International Ice Hockey Federation (IIHF). Colombia is currently not ranked in the IIHF World Ranking and has not entered in any IIHF World Championship events. They are working on the women's national ice hockey team and have participated in the Amerigol LATAM Cup some years and other tournaments like the Pan American Ice Hockey Tournament.

== History ==
Colombia made its debut on 2 March 2014, and played its first game against Argentina at the 2014 Pan American Ice Hockey Tournament being held in Mexico City. Colombia was one of five teams to participate in the tournament, which included Argentina, Brazil, Mexico and a selection team from Canada. After winning their opening game of the tournament against Argentina, The team had two straight losses to Canada and Mexico. They completed the round robin off with a 14–0 win over Brazil. They were drawn against Argentina for the bronze medal match, which they went on to a 9–1 win.

On 13 September 2022, Colombia played a friendly match against Argentina at the NHL's Florida Panthers home ice arena, the FLA Live Arena, in Sunrise, Florida, before the 2022 Amerigol LATAM Cup began. They completed with a 7–3 win over Argentina.

== Tournament record ==
=== Pan American Tournament ===
Year	Host	Result	Pld	W	OTW	OTL	L
2014	Mexico City	3rd place	5	3	0	0	2
2015	Mexico City	1st place	5	4	1	0	0
2016	Mexico City	1st place	6	4	1	0	1
2017	Mexico City	2nd place	6	4	0	0	2
Total		4/4	22	15	2	0	5

=== Amerigol LATAM Cup ===
Year	Host	Result	Pld	W	OTW	OTL	L
2018	(United States) Coral Springs	1st place	6	6	0	0	0
2019	(United States) Coral Springs	2nd place (Division I)	6	4	0	0	2
2020	(United States) Coral Springs	Cancelled due to the COVID-19 pandemic					
2021	(United States) Coral Springs	1st place (Division I)	5	3	0	0	2
2022	(United States) Coral Springs	4th place (Division I)	6	3	0	0	3
2023		Did not participate in Division I					
Total		4/5	23	16	0	0	7

=== Amerigol LATAM Cup Spring Classic ===
Year	Host	Result	Pld	W	T	L
2022	(United States) Dallas	Semifinal Loss	5	2	0	3
Total		0/1	5	3	0	3

=== IIHF Development Cup ===
Year	Host	Result	Pld	W	T	L
2022	(Germany) Füssen	1st place	5	4	1	0
2023	(Slovakia) Bratislava	3rd place	4	2	0	2
2024	(Slovakia) Bratislava	3rd place	6	4	0	2
Total		3/3	15	10	1	4

== All-time record against other nations ==
Last match update: 22 August 2025

Team	Pld	W	T	L	GF	GA	+/–
Algeria	1	1	0	0	11	1	+10
Andorra	1	1	0	0	8	3	+5
Argentina	18	12	1	5	101	80	+21
Brazil	11	9	1	1	65	16	+49
Chile	2	2	0	0	17	2	+15
Egypt	1	0	0	1	2	8	-6
Greece	1	1	0	0	8	0	+8
Ireland	3	1	1	1	10	16	-6
Jamaica	3	0	0	3	2	20	-18
Lebanon	3	1	0	2	11	20	-9
Liechtenstein	2	1	0	1	6	11	-5
Mexico	6	2	0	4	14	27	-13
Portugal	3	2	0	1	32	10	+22
Puerto Rico	6	1	0	5	11	27	-16
Venezuela	5	4	0	1	35	11	+24
Total	66	38	3	25	333	252	+81
