= Puerto Rico men's national ice hockey team =

Puerto Rico
- Association: Puerto Rico Ice Hockey Association
- Head coach: Antonio Cruz Jr.
- Captain: Scott Vargas
- Most games: Scott Vargas (46)
- Top scorer: Scott Vargas (27)
- Most points: Scott Vargas (42)
- Team colors
- IIHF code: PUR

Ranking
- Current IIHF: NR (3 June 2026)

First international
- Puerto Rico 5–3 Argentina (Coral Springs, United States; October 14, 2021)

Biggest win
- Puerto Rico 19–0 Brazil (Canillo, Andorra; April 26, 2025)

Biggest defeat
- Jamaica 11–2 Puerto Rico (Dix Hills, United States; June 7, 2024)

IIHF Development Cup
- Appearances: 1 (first in 2025)
- Best result: 1st (2025)

Amerigol LATAM Cup
- Appearances: 4 (first in 2021)
- Best result: 1st (2022)

International record (W–L–T)
- 22–17–1

Medal record

Amerigol LATAM Cup
Gold medal – first place	2022 Coral Springs	Division 1
Silver medal – second place	2021 Coral Springs	Division 1
Bronze medal – third place	2025 Coral Springs	Division 1

IIHF Development Cup
Gold medal – first place	2025 Canillo	

The Puerto Rico national ice hockey team (Spanish: Selección de hockey sobre hielo de Puerto Rico) is the national men's ice hockey team of Puerto Rico. The team is controlled by the Puerto Rico Ice Hockey Association and has been an associate member of the International Ice Hockey Federation (IIHF) since September 29, 2022. Puerto Rico is currently not ranked in the IIHF World Ranking and has not entered in any IIHF World Championship events, but played in the Amerigol LATAM Cup since 2019.

== History ==
=== Amerigol competition ===
==== LATAM Cup ====
While the Amerigol LATAM Cup is the only annual competition for Puerto Rico, the tournament is not sanctioned by the IIHF, and therefore does not count towards Puerto Rico's official international record.

Puerto Rico made its international debut in 2019 at the Amerigol LATAM Cup, sanctioned by the Amerigol International Hockey Association. It took place in Coral Springs, Florida, United States. Puerto Rico entered the Division 2 tournament and played four unofficial games against clubs and "B" teams. They defeated Argentina "B" (11–2), then Colombia "B" (5–2), and Brazil "B" (6–0). In the Amerigol LATAM Cup Division 2 final, they were defeated by the Falkland Islands selection team, known as the "Rest of the World", 6–2, and were awarded a silver medal after finishing in second place.

In 2021, the national team played in the Amerigol LATAM Cup Division 1 tournament, losing 5–4 to the Mexico Selects team. Later that same day, they defeated Argentina, 5–3, which is Puerto Rico's first official game against another national team. In the semi-finals, they defeated the Mexico Selects team, 6–2. They once again won a silver medal after losing 5–1 to Colombia in the final.

On September 18, 2022, the national team finished first in Division 1 at the 2022 Amerigol LATAM Cup after defeating Argentina 4–3 in the final. Eleven days later, Puerto Rico officially became a new member of the IIHF.

=== Notable players of Puerto Rican descent ===
There are only two notable players of Puerto Rican descent in the United States to have played in the National Hockey League (NHL):

- Boo Nieves, played for 76 games in four seasons with the New York Rangers (2016–2020)
- Nick Paul, played for 227 games with the Ottawa Senators and 259 games with the Tampa Bay Lightning (2015–present)

Nieves and Paul are the only players of Puerto Rican descent to ever play in the NHL.

=== Coaching history ===
	Coach	GC	W	OTW	OTL	L	Pts
2019	(United States) Ron Robichaud	4	3	0	0	1	9
2021	Unknown Coach	4	2	0	0	2	6
2022–2024	(Canada) Paul Cohen	18	9	0	0	9	27
2024–2025	(United States) Alex Houston	9	5	1	0	3	17
2025–present	(United States) Antonio Cruz Jr.	5	2	0	1	2	7

== Tournament record ==
=== Amerigol LATAM Cup ===
Year	Host	Result	Pld	W	OTW	T	OTL	L
2019	(United States) Coral Springs	Participated unofficially in Division 2						
2020	(United States) Coral Springs	Cancelled due to the COVID-19 pandemic						
2021	(United States) Coral Springs	2nd place (Division 1)	4	2	0	0	0	2
2022	(United States) Coral Springs	1st place (Division 1)	6	4	0	0	0	2
2023	(United States) Coral Springs	did not participate						
2024	(United States) Coral Springs	5th place	4	2	0	0	0	2
2025	(United States) Coral Springs	3rd place (Division 1)	5	2	0	1	0	2
2026	(United States) Coral Springs	16th place (Division 2)	4	1	0	0	0	3
Total		4/7	23	11	0	1	0	11

=== Amerigol LATAM Spring Classic ===
Year	Host	Result	Pld	W	OTW	OTL	L
2025	(United States) Henderson	1st place	5	3	1	0	1
Total		1/1	5	3	1	0	1

=== IIHF Development Cup ===
Year	Host	Result	Pld	W	OTW	OTL	L
2025	(Andorra) Canillo	1st place	5	4	1	0	0
2026	(Morocco)	Cancelled.					
Total		1/1	5	4	1	0	0

=== Dream Nations Cup ===
Year	Host	Result	Pld	W	OTW	OTL	L
2025	(United States) East Rutherford	5th place	3	1	0	0	2
Total		1/1	3	1	0	0	2

== Fixtures and results ==
The following is a list of match results in the last 12 months, as well as any future matches that have been scheduled.

Against other national teams
Opponent	Date	Score	Scores by period	Tournament	Host venue
Jamaica	May 8, 2026	6–2	1–0, 5–0, 0–2	Challenger Series	Fifth Third Arena, Chicago, Illinois
Lebanon	May 10, 2026	5–4; OT	2–1, 0–2, 2–1, 1–0	Challenger Series	Fifth Third Arena, Chicago, Illinois
Lebanon	July 9, 2026	4–5; OT	No information	Challenger Series	Sportplexe Pierrefonds, Quebec
Jamaica	July 10, 2026	4–7	No information	Challenger Series	Sportplexe Pierrefonds, Quebec
Against club and other teams
Opponent	Date	Score	Scores by period	Tournament	Host venue
(Greece) Greek Heritage Team	May 9, 2026	5–8	0–1, 1–4, 4–3	Challenger Series	Fifth Third Arena, Chicago, Illinois
(Greece) Greek Heritage Team	July 11, 2026	1–5	No information	Challenger Series	Sportplexe Pierrefonds, Quebec
Win Loss Tie

== All-time record against other national teams ==
Last match update: July 12, 2026

Key
Positive balance (more wins)
Neutral balance (wins = losses)
Negative balance (more losses)

Team	GP	W	T	L	GF	GA
Andorra	1	1	0	0	15	1
Argentina	10	3	1	6	34	50
Brazil	3	3	0	0	36	3
Colombia	6	5	0	1	27	11
Egypt	1	0	0	1	1	5
Greece	1	1	0	0	11	1
Jamaica	11	5	0	6	49	62
Lebanon	9	3	0	6	36	49
Liechtenstein	1	1	0	0	5	2
Portugal	1	1	0	0	2	1
Venezuela	1	1	0	0	5	1
Total	45	24	1	20	221	186
