= Mexico Ice Hockey Federation =

Ice hockey governing body in Mexico

Mexico
- Association name: Federación Deportiva de México de Hockey sobre Hielo, A.C.
- IIHF Code: MEX
- IIHF membership: 30 April 1985
- President: Joaquín de la Garma
- IIHF men's ranking: 35th
- IIHF women's ranking: 26th

The Mexico Ice Hockey Federation (Spanish: Federación Deportiva de México de Hockey sobre Hielo, A.C.) is the governing body that oversees Ice hockey in Mexico.
