= Ice hockey by country =

The International Ice Hockey Federation has 84 members (61 full members, 22 associate members and 1 affiliate member).

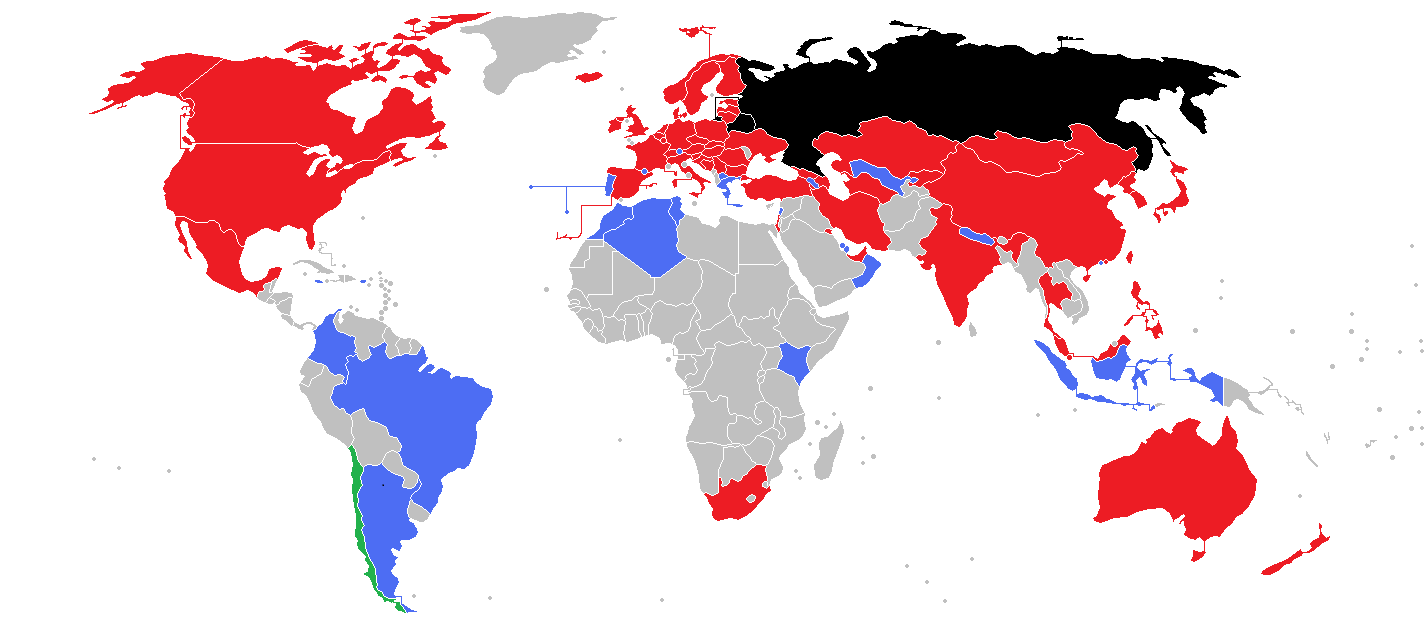
The current members of the IIHF. (Red indicates full members, blue indicates associate members and green indicates affiliate members).

== Current countries ==
=== Africa ===
Country	Information
Algeria	There are four ice rinks in three cities; two in Algiers, one in Oran and another one in Tizi Ouzou. The Algerian Association of Ice and Inline Hockey was founded in 2006. The Algeria national team participated in the Arab Cup in 2008.
Egypt	There are eleven ice rinks in six cities; three in Cairo, three in Sharm el-Sheikh, two in the 6th of October City, one in Hurghada, one Borg El Arab and one in Tanta. The first Egyptian ice hockey team was founded in Maadi in 2002, it is still an amateur team that seeks official recognition and it cooperates with the Ministry of Youth and Sports to launch the Egyptian Ice Hockey Federation. The Anubis Ice Hockey Team organizes the annual Egyptian Ramadani Ice Hockey Cup. The tournament takes place mainly in the Genena Mall ice rink in East Cairo. Anubis participated in Africa's first ever ice hockey club championship, the African Cup which was held in Rabat, Morocco from July 24 to 31, 2016, under the supervision of the International Ice Hockey Federation and the Royal Moroccan Ice Hockey Federation.
Kenya	There is an ice rink in Nairobi known as the Solar Ice Rink located in the Panari Sky Centre. Ice hockey is played at the facility and there is an informal competition known as the Kenyan Ice Hockey League. Games are played on Wednesdays which are known as "Ice Hockey Wednesday". The rink hosted a "local tournament for schools" on April 24, 2015, which was billed as the "First Ice Hockey Tournament in East & Central Africa". Johnny Oduya is of Kenyan descent, who won two Stanley Cups with the Chicago Blackhawks in 2013 and 2015.
Morocco	IIHF member. 2 rinks. 225 registered players. There are three teams, the Capitals, Les Ifis and the Falcons. The Royal Moroccan Ice Hockey Federation was founded on February 8, 2016. The Morocco national team participated in the Arab Cup in 2008.
Nigeria	There is an ice rink in Lagos was installed at the Silverbird Galleria in December 2006. Philorem Limited installed the first successful synthetic ice rink at the Ikeja City Mall known as "Philorem Ice Skating Arena" in September 2014, but no ice hockey is played. Rumun Ndur, who played in the NHL, was born in Zaria.
South Africa	IIHF member. 7 rinks. 766 registered players. There are two regional leagues in the country, the Gauteng Premier League and the Western Province League. The top teams meet for the national title in the Interprovincial Championships. South Africa has men's, women's and junior national teams. Olaf Kölzig, a German goaltender who played in the NHL, was born in Johannesburg.
Tunisia	There is an ice rink in Hammamet known as "Blue Ice", it's located about 65 kilometers from the Tunis–Carthage International Airport and 60 kilometers from the capital of Tunis. The Tunisian Ice Hockey Association was founded in 2009. The Tunisia national team played its first unofficial game against a French team, Coqs de Courbevoie on June 14, 2014, they were defeat by them, 6–5.
Uganda	There is an ice rink at the Tirupati Mazima Mall in Kampala known as "Jubilate Ice Skating". There is a team, the Kampala Alligators.

=== Americas ===
Country	Information
Argentina	IIHF member. There is an outdoor ice rink in Ushuaia. 1,023 registered players. The men's national team made its debut on February 18, 2012, losing 5:1 to Mexico. A repeat of the game was held on the 19th, with Argentina falling 10:1. The women's national team also made its debut on February 18, 2012, beating Mexico 1:0 in their first international game. Mexico defeating Argentina, 7:1 on February 19, 2012. The Argentina national team participated in the 2014 Pan American Tournament. They finished in 4th place after losing to Colombia, 9:1 in the bronze medal game. Also they finished 5th place in the 2015 Pan American Tournament. Argentina has men's, women's, and inline national teams.
Bahamas	There is an ice rink in Nassau known as "Breezes Bahamas". The rink measures 1,600 square feet and it's open 24 hours a day. Ice hockey skates, sticks, and pucks are given to guests during their stay. No competitive games are played. Andre Deveaux, who played in the NHL, was born in Freeport.
Bolivia	Ice hockey activities existed in the 1970s, but later died out by the end of the decade. Although Bolivia has ice rinks in Santa Cruz de la Sierra and La Paz. An Xtraice synthetic ice rink known as "La Pista", exists in the capital of La Paz. It received over 100,000 visitors during its first year of operation.
Brazil	IIHF member. 7 rinks. 330 registered players. There are a number of rinks around the country and some hockey is played. The Brazilian Championship has been contested since 2008. Notable players were born in Brazil are Mike Greenlay and Robyn Regehr, who both played in the NHL. The Brazil national team made its debut on March 2, 2014, losing 16:0 to Mexico in their first international game during the 2014 Pan American Tournament. They finished last place after losing all four games. Also they finished 3rd place (won the bronze medal) in the 2015 Pan American Tournament. Brazil has men's and inline national team.
Canada	IIHF member. 8,300 rinks. 637,000 registered players. Seven Canadian-based teams participate in the National Hockey League (NHL). Canadian teams also participate in several North American minor leagues, the American Hockey League (AHL), the ECHL, and the Ligue Nord-Américaine de Hockey (LNAH). The Stanley Cup is the North American professional championship trophy, awarded since 1893. The Allan Cup is the Canadian senior championship trophy, awarded since 1909. The Memorial Cup is the Canadian major junior championship trophy, organized by the Canadian Hockey League (CHL), awarded since 1919. The University Cup is the Canadian collegiate national championship trophy, organized by U Sports, awarded since 1963. The Clarkson Cup is the Canadian women's championship trophy, awarded since 2009. Canada has men's, women's and junior national teams. For more information on this country's ice hockey activities, see Ice hockey in Canada.
Chile	IIHF member. 493 registered players. There are three ice rinks in Santiago, Puerto Montt and Punta Arenas, but no ice hockey is played. However, a 3-on-3 ice hockey tournament known as the "Copa Invernada" has been contested in the city of Punta Arenas in southern Chile since 2013. Chile is currently an IIHF affiliate member and has only participated in the IIHF Inline Hockey World Championship. Their last appearance was 2015. These claims have never been substantiated and it may well have been that the game has played was field hockey. The Chile national team made its debut on June 5, 2017, they participated at the 2017 Pan American Tournament in Mexico City, Mexico. They finished 7th place with a record of 2–4.
Colombia	There are two ice rinks in Bogota. The Colombia national team made its debut on March 2, 2014, winning 11:1 over Argentina in their first international game during the 2014 Pan American Tournament. They finished 3rd place after defeating Argentina, 9:1 in the bronze medal game. In the 2015 Pan American Tournament, Colombia defeating Mexico, 4:3 in a game-winning shootout to win their first ever Pan American Tournament champion. In the 2016 Pan American Tournament, a repeat in a shootout, Colombia defeating Mexico again, 3:2 to win their second consecutive Pan American Tournament champions. Notable players of Colombian descent are Edwin Hedberg and Camilo Miettinen.
Costa Rica	An ice rink exists and there is a team, the Castillo Knights. There is also an ice hockey league in Costa Rica. The Costa Rica national team played three games against the Mighty Pirates from Canada in 2000. They were defeat by them 13:8, victory over them 10:9, and tied them 12:12.
Cuba	A Cuba National men's Ice Hockey team, composed of Cuban-heritage players in the U.S. and exiles, competes in the Amerigol LATAM Cup, leveraging temporary rinks like La Esquina Fría in Havana since Cuba lacks permanent ones.
Ecuador	There is an ice rink in Quito known as the Palacio del Hielo, which is on the ground floor of Centro Comercial Iñaquito (CCI) near SuperMaxi. Some ice hockey is played.
Falkland Islands	Dek hockey has been played in the country since 2006 and inline hockey was later taken up. The Falkland Islands is one of 14 British Overseas Territories and the smallest country with a population of less than 3,000 people. The Falkland Islands Hockey Association which organizes dek hockey on the island, that is a section on its website for ice hockey. There are no ice rinks on its island. However, the Falkland Islands made its debut on July 2, 2015, and competed in a 3-on-3 tournament, the Copa Invernada, winning over the Chilean team, the Santiago Yetis, 8–2. They were the champions after winning all four of them with an undefeated record (4–0).
Haiti	Some initial ice hockey activities took place in the capital of Port-au-Prince in the 1970s. However, no real games played there. In 2013, Haiti's first ice rink at a basketball gym in Port-au-Prince. It costs $1,600 an hour to run the generator that keeps the ice cold. Notable players of Haitian descent are Maxime Boisclair, Anthony Duclair, Maxime Fortunus, Jean-Luc Grand-Pierre, Georges Laraque, and Claude Vilgrain. No ice hockey is played in the country however, in 2015, the Haitian ball hockey team participated in the Ball Hockey World Championship in Zug, Switzerland. They finished 13th place after winning 4:2 over the Cayman Islands. Former NHL player, Georges Laraque served as an assistant coach and a chief fund-raiser for the team. Haiti played in an exhibition game against Lebanon on April 23, 2017, at the Aréna Raymond-Bourque in Saint-Laurent, Quebec, Canada, with both teams making their international ice hockey debut. Haiti falling to Lebanon, 7–4 in their first international game.
Jamaica	IIHF member. Currently no IIHF standard rinks. 28 registered players. The Jamaican Olympic Ice Hockey Federation (JOIHF) was founded in late 2011 and it joined the IIHF on May 18, 2012. Graeme Townshend, who played in the NHL, was born in Kingston. On May 14, 2017, the Jamaica U20 National Team played its first unofficial game against Nova Scotia U20 Team in Dartmouth, Nova Scotia, Canada. The team winning over them 5–1.
Mexico	IIHF member. 18 rinks. 1,552 registered players. The Mexican Elite League has been the national league since 2010. Before the LME, a Mexican Ice Hockey Championship was held. Mexico hosted the Pan American Ice Hockey Tournament presented by the Federación Deportiva de México de Hockey sobre Hielo. They finished 2nd as the runner-up in both events. Mexico has men's, women's and junior national teams.
Peru	There is an ice rink in Lima known as "Iceland Park", has an ice surface about 500 square meters. Some informal ice hockey matches are played, but no league exists.
Puerto Rico	There are two ice rinks in Aguadilla and San Juan. The Aguadilla Ice Skating Arena was opened in 2005. The Puerto Rico Ice Hockey Federation was formed shortly before the arena was opened with Philip Painter, the first vice-president. Ice hockey is organized into national teams overseen by the Puerto Rico Ice Hockey Association. In 2006, as part of the pre-season for the 2006–07 NHL season, the Florida Panthers and the New York Rangers played in an exhibition game at the Coliseo de Puerto Rico.
Saint Pierre and Miquelon	There is an ice rink and there are two teams, the Cougars and the Missiles. In 2008, the national team played an exhibition game in Saint-Pierre, losing to France, 8–6.
Trinidad and Tobago	Sam Gellard, who played in the World Hockey Association (WHA), was born in Port of Spain. Due to lack of ice rinks and ice hockey activities in the country however, a fictional team from Trinidad and Tobago was featured in the movie, D2: The Mighty Ducks.
United States	IIHF member. 2,035 rinks. 562,145 registered players. 25 out of 32 National Hockey League (NHL) teams are based in the United States. There are also numerous minor leagues below the NHL with the majority of the teams in the U.S. (AHL, ECHL, SPHL and FPHL). The NCAA Division I Ice Hockey Tournament has been held yearly since 1948. The National Women's Hockey League (NWHL) has been held since 2015. The Isobel Cup is the American women's professional championship trophy, awarded since 2016. The United States has men's, women's and junior national teams. The Seattle Kraken become the 32nd team in the NHL, it is based in Seattle, WA, which began played in the 2021-2022 season.
Venezuela	There is an ice rink in Caracas known as the El Ávila Ice Skating Rink. There is also an ice rink at the Galerías Mall in Maracaibo, but no ice hockey is played. Notable players were born in Venezuela are Rick Chartraw and Don Spring, who both played in the NHL.

=== Asia and Oceania ===
Country	Information
Australia	IIHF member. 20 rinks. 4,465 registered players. The Australian Ice Hockey League (AIHL) has been the country's national league since 2000. Prior to that, the Goodall Cup was the national championship from 1909-1999. It is now awarded to the AIHL champion. From 1955-1976, an Australian Club Championship was also held. Australia has men's, women's and junior national teams. Nathan Walker was the first Australian player drafted by the Washington Capitals in the 3rd round (89th overall) in the 2014 NHL entry draft.
Bahrain	There is an ice rink with a small recreational hockey league. Bahrain has sent teams to tournaments around Asia. Bahraini teams won tournaments in Dubai in 1995 and 1996, they finished as runners-up in 1994. The Bahrain national team made its debut on January 8, 2010, playing a friendly game against Kuwait, which they lost 10-3. They participated at the 2011 Asian Winter Games, finished last place in the Premier Division, and the GCC Gulf Championship in 2012.
China	IIHF member. 410 rinks. 2,764 registered players. The Chinese Ice Hockey Championship has been held since 1953. The country's top team was China Dragon, who played in the multi-national Asia League, they ceased operation after the 2016–17 season. It has been superseded by HC Kunlun Red Star who compete in the multi-national Kontinental Hockey League. China has men's, women's and junior national teams. Andong Song was the first Chinese player drafted by the New York Islanders in the 6th round (172nd overall) in the 2015 NHL entry draft.
Chinese Taipei (Taiwan)	IIHF member. 4 rinks. 1,015 registered players. The Chinese Taipei Ice Hockey League has existed as Taiwan's top level league since 2004. Prior to that, in some years, a national championship was contested. The Chinese Taipei national team has participated in the IIHF Challenge Cup of Asia in 2008 through 2016, and the Asian Winter Games in 2011 and 2017. Also an under-18 national team participated in the IIHF World U18 Championship Division III every year since 2008. Chinese Taipei made its debut in the World Championship competing in Division III in Bulgaria in 2017. Chinese Taipei has men's, women's and junior national teams. Hockey Hall of Fame member Rod Langway was born in Taipei.
Hong Kong	IIHF member. 5 rinks. 1,524 registered players. The Hong Kong Ice Hockey League has been played since 1995. The Hong Kong national team participated in the IIHF Challenge Cup of Asia in 2008 through 2014. Hong Kong has not participated in any World Championship for 26 years (first since 1987), but returned to the World Championship competing in Division III in Luxembourg in 2014. Hong Kong has men's and women's national teams. There is also a professional league, the Chinese Hockey League, based in Hong Kong which is run on a yearly draft basis.
India	IIHF member. 18 rinks. 1,293 registered players. The Indian Ice Hockey Championship has been contested since 2001. The men's national team participated in the IIHF Challenge Cup of Asia in 2009 through 2018. The women's national team made its debut on March 22, 2016, losing 8:1 to Singapore in their first international game during the 2016 IIHF Women's Challenge Cup of Asia Division I, finished last place after losing all four games. India has men's and women's national teams.
Indonesia	IIHF member. 4 rinks. 141 registered players. The Federasi Hoki Es Indonesia (FHEI) was founded in 2012 and it joined the IIHF on May 20, 2016. There is a small recreational hockey league known as the Indonesia Ice Hockey League (IIHL). Richie Regehr, who played for EHC München in the Deutsche Eishockey Liga, was born in Bandung. Indonesia competed at the 2017 Asian Winter Games. They finished last place (8th in Division II) after losing all three games to Malaysia, Macau and Turkmenistan.
Iran	There are three ice rinks in Tehran, Mashhad and Kish Island. Farzad Houshidari (Persian: فرزاد هوشیدری) is the country's first ice hockey player to go abroad. Notable players of Iranian descent are Daniel Rahimi, Mika Zibanejad, and Rhett Rakhshani. Current national team vice captain, Samson Mahbod plays in the KHL. So far the national team held a total of four camps, June 2016 in Asiago, August 2016 in Almaty, December 2016 in Dubai and January 2017 in Tehran. August 23, 2016, The Iran national team played its first unofficial game against a Kazakh team, HC Almaty, winning 5-4 in Almaty. On October 1, 2016, the first ice hockey match was played between two Iranian teams in a friendly in Padide Ice Rink in Mashhad, Padide defeated Khorasan Razavi 5-4. Iran was supposed to compete at the 2017 Asian Winter Games, but they were disqualified after a number of players were deemed ineligible to compete in the regional games.
Israel	IIHF member. 3 rinks. 1,838 registered players. The Israeli Hockey League, founded in 1993, is the national league in the country. Israel has men's and junior national teams.
Japan	IIHF member. 167 rinks. 18,765 registered players. The Japan Ice Hockey League was the national league in the country from 1966–2004, when it folded in favor of the multi-national Asia League. Since 1933, a cup competition, the All Japan Ice hockey Championship has been held. A women's counterpart has been held since 1982. Japan has men's, women's and junior national teams. The Japan women's national team qualified for the 2014 Winter Olympics in Sochi and the 2018 Winter Olympics in Pyeongchang. Japan hosted and participated at the 2017 Asian Winter Games in Sapporo.
Kazakhstan	IIHF member. 373 rinks. 6,478 registered players. The Kazakhstan Championship, founded in 1992, is the country's top level league. The Kazakhstan Cup has been held since the 2001-02 season, with the exception of 2004-05 and 2009. Kazakhstan's top team, Barys Astana, participates in the multi-national Kontinental Hockey League. Kazakhstan has men's, women's and junior national teams.
North Korea	IIHF member. 13 rinks. 2,300 registered players. The North Korean Championship has been contested since 1956. The North Korea national team participated at the Asian Winter Games in 1986, 1990 and 2007. North Korea has men's, women's and junior national teams.
South Korea	IIHF member. 30 rinks. 3,052 registered players. The top Korean teams, Anyang Halla, High1 and Daemyung Killer Whales participates in the multi-national Asia League. The Korea Domestic Championship, open to both club teams and university teams, has been held since 1955. From 1996-2003, the Korean Ice Hockey League also existed. Jim Paek is of Korean descent, who played in the NHL, was born in Seoul. Korea has men's, women's and junior national teams. Korea hosted and participated at the 2018 Winter Olympics in Pyeongchang.
Kuwait	IIHF member. 3 rinks. 530 registered players. In 2009, the Kuwait Hockey League was held, with Kuwait City winning. The league has not been held since. The Kuwait national team has participated in the Asian Winter Games in 1999, 2007, 2011 and 2017, the IIHF Challenge Cup of Asia in 2010 through 2018, the Arab Cup in 2008, and the GCC Gulf Championship in 2010, 2012, 2014 and 2016. Kuwait has men's national team.
Kyrgyzstan	IIHF member. 17 rinks. 915 registered players. The Kyrgyzstan Championship has been held since 2008. In 1962, the Kyrgyzstan national team played three games, losing to Estonia, Georgia and Lithuania. They participated at the 2011 Asian Winter Games, winning the Premier Division, and the IIHF Challenge Cup of Asia in 2014 through 2016. Kyrgyzstan has men's national team.
Lebanon	The country has a team, the Veg Group Beirut. There is a small recreational hockey league known as the Lebanese Minor Hockey League, co-founded by Gordon Penney and Jiří Vlk from the Canadian and Czech embassies, respectively, and a Lebanese native Tony Abi Almeh, at the Ice Skating Arena in Zouk Mosbeh in 2003. The league was set to visit Prague for the tournament in 2005. Hockey died out after the rink was shuttered in 2006. The Lebanese Hockey Association, founded by Pascal Malkoun in 2015, has been created to advance ice, inline and ball hockey initiatives of Lebanese hockey players on a worldwide basis in addition to enabling international development and representation of the country in the sport of hockey. Nazem Kadri is of Lebanese descent, who currently played for the Toronto Maple Leafs in the NHL. Ed Hatoum who also played in the NHL, was born in Beirut. Lebanon played its first game on April 15, 2017. Lebanon defeating Maghreb United, 8–3. Maghreb United was made up of players from Morocco, Algeria and Tunisia. Lebanon played in an exhibition game against Haiti on April 23, 2017, at the Aréna Raymond-Bourque in Saint-Laurent, Quebec, Canada, with both teams making their international ice hockey debut. Lebanon gets their first international win over Haiti with a score of 7–4.
Macau	IIHF member. 1 rink. 86 registered players. The Macau national team has participated in the Asian Winter Games in 2007 and 2017, and the IIHF Challenge Cup of Asia every year since 2008. They also participated in the Shenzhen–Hong Kong–Macau Ice Hockey League in 2007–08, going 0–1–5. Macau has men's national team.
Malaysia	IIHF member. 2 rinks. 367 registered players. The Malaysian Ice Hockey League has existed since 2002. The Malaysia national team participated in the IIHF Challenge Cup of Asia every year since 2008, and the Asian Winter Games in 2007, 2011 and 2017. Malaysia has men's and women's national teams. Malaysia hosted and made its debut in ice hockey tournament at the 2017 Southeast Asian Games.
Mongolia	IIHF member. 21 rinks. 730 registered players. The Mongolia Hockey League was founded in 1991, is the country's national league. The Mongolia national team participated in the IIHF Challenge Cup of Asia every year since 2009, and the Asian Winter Games in 1999, 2003, 2011 and 2017. Mongolia is unable to compete in any IIHF tournaments, when the IIHF enacted new "minimum participation standards", stipulating that Mongolia must have at least one functional, full-sized indoor rink. Their last appearance was the 2013 IIHF World Championship Division III. Mongolia has men's national team.
Nepal	IIHF member. Currently one IIHF standard rink and no registered players. The Nepal Ice Hockey Association was founded on June 17, 2014, and it joined the IIHF on May 20, 2016. There is a single ice rink constructed in 2017. Tilicho Lake is frozen for nearly half a year and was used for training until the current rink was constructed.
New Zealand	IIHF member. 11 rinks. 1,335 registered players. The New Zealand Ice Hockey League has been the national league since 2005. Prior to its founding, the New Zealand Championship was contested in some years. New Zealand has men's, women's and junior national teams.
Oman	IIHF member. 2 rinks. 73 registered players. There are two teams, Wadi Dogs and Muscat Cobras. The Oman Ice Sports Committee was founded and it joined the IIHF in May, 2014. The Oman national team participated in the GCC Gulf Championship in 2010, 2012, 2014 and 2016, and the IIHF Challenge Cup of Asia in 2015 and 2017.
Pakistan	Ice hockey is a minor, developing sport in Pakistan, as the country lacks official IIHF-standard rinks. Both the Men's and Women's National Pakistan Ice Hockey team compete in the Amerigol LATAM cup
Philippines	IIHF member. 4 rinks. 131 registered players. There is a recreational hockey league around the capital of Manila known as the Manila Ice Hockey League (MIHL). The Federation of Ice Hockey League (FIHL) was founded in 2015 and it joined the IIHF on May 20, 2016. By July 2016, the federation has become a member of the Philippine Olympic Committee and the national team can apply to participate in the official tournaments such as the Challenge Cup of Asia and the Southeast Asian Games. The Philippines competed at the 2017 Asian Winter Games. They finished 13th place (3rd in Division II) after defeating Macau 9:2. The women's national team made its debut on March 7, 2017, playing against Thailand, losing to them 21–1 during the 2017 IIHF Women's Challenge Cup of Asia.
Qatar	IIHF member. 3 rinks. 106 registered players. The Qatar Winter Sports Committee was founded in 2010 and it joined the IIHF on May 18, 2012. The Qatar Ice Hockey League has been the country's national league since 2005. The Qatar national team participated in the GCC Gulf Championship in 2014 and 2016.
Saudi Arabia	There are three ice rinks in Dhahran, Jeddah and Riyadh. Saudi Arabia participated in the GCC Gulf Championship in 2010. They finished 3rd place (won the bronze medal) after defeating Oman, 3–1.
Singapore	IIHF member. 2 rinks. 533 registered players. The Singapore National Ice Hockey League is the national league in the country. It was held yearly from 1995 to 2009, but it has not been held since. The Singapore national team participated in the IIHF Challenge Cup of Asia in 2008 through 2018. Singapore has men's and women's national teams.
Tajikistan	There are two ice rinks in Khujand and Safed Dara. On January 8, 2017, the first ever ice hockey game in Tajikistan took place, with the debut match taking place between Safed Dara and Farozom at the Safed Dara Ski Resort.
Thailand	IIHF member. 3 rinks. 359 registered players. The Thai World Hockey League was founded in 2003, is the national league in the country. The Thailand national team participated in the IIHF Challenge Cup of Asia every year since 2008, and the Asian Winter Games in 2003, 2007, 2011 and 2017. Thailand has men's and women's national teams.
Turkmenistan	IIHF member. 4 rinks. 354 registered players. The Turkmenistan Championship was founded in 2013, is the national championship in the country. The Turkmenistan national team held its first international match against the Belarusian club team, Minsk City, which they won by 7:2. The National Center of Turkmenistan for Winter Sports was founded and it joined the IIHF in May 2015. Turkmenistan made its debut on February 18, 2017, and competed at the 2017 Asian Winter Games. They won their first international game by defeating Malaysia, 9–2, and later went on to win the Division II by defeating Kyrgyzstan, 7–3.
United Arab Emirates	IIHF member. 5 rinks. 563 registered players. The Emirates Ice Hockey League is the national league in the country. The UAE national team has participated in the IIHF World Championship Division III in 2010, 2013, 2014, 2015 and 2017, the IIHF Challenge Cup of Asia in 2009 through 2017, the Asian Winter Games in 2007, 2011 and 2017, the Arab Cup in 2008, and the GCC Gulf Championship in 2010, 2012, 2014 and 2016. The UAE has men's and women's national teams.
Uzbekistan	There is a synthetic ice sheet in Tashkent. The regular ice rink in Tashkent is closed around 1990. Binokor Tashkent played in the Vtoraya Liga/Pervaya Liga (2nd and 3rd level Soviet leagues) from 1970–1988. In 1986, the Uzbekistan national team played a game against Latvia, losing 5–2. Ice hockey in Uzbekistan was revived in 2012 and the Uzbekistan Hockey League was founded in 2013.

=== Europe ===
Country	Information
Andorra	IIHF member. 50 registered players. There is an ice rink in Canillo (Palau de Gel) and there is a team, the Andorra Hoquei Gel. Andorra hosted the 1997 IIHF World Championship Group D tournament. The Andorra national team made its debut on September 29, 2017, and competed in the Development Cup in Canillo. They finished last place after losing all of their matches in the tournament. The first match was a 3–2 loss to Portugal in a shootout.
Armenia	IIHF member. 5 rinks. 289 registered players. The Armenian Hockey League, founded in 2000, is the country's top league, governed by the Ice Hockey Federation of Armenia. Teams include Urartu Yerevan, Dinamo Yerevan, Shirak Gyumri, SCA Yerevan, and Shengavit Yerevan. The Armenia national team was suspended by the IIHF in April 2010, for use of ineligible players in the 2008 IIHF World Championship Division III Qualification and the 2010 IIHF World Championship Division III Group B. The Armenia U20 national team participated in the IIHF World U20 Championship in 2006, 2007, and 2008.
Austria	IIHF member. 75 rinks. 8,634 registered players. In 1912, Austria hosted the European Championships, finishing in 3rd place. The tournament was later annulled, because Austria was not an IIHF member at the time. The Erste Bank Eishockey Liga, founded as the Austrian Championship in 1922, is the top level league, and also consists of teams from Croatia, Czech Republic, Hungary and Slovenia. The Nationalliga is the second level league, and the Oberliga is the third level league. Austria has men's, women's and junior national teams.
Azerbaijan	IIHF member. There is an ice rink in Baku at the Elite Shopping and Entertainment Center. In 1961, Baku hosted a tournament were the different soviet republics played against each other. However, the country did not have a team at the tournament and no ice hockey is played now.
Belarus	IIHF member. 41 rinks. 5,370 registered players. Hockey was developed in Belarus after World War II, and Dinamo Minsk was founded in 1946. They played in the top level Soviet League. The Belarusian Extraliga, founded in 1992, is the top level league, and the Vysshaya Liga is the second level league. When Belarus was part of the Soviet Union, an unofficial Belarusian Championship was contested in some years. Belarus has men's and junior national team.
Belgium	IIHF member. 16 rinks. 2,421 registered players. The BeNe League, founded in 2015, is the top level league following the merger between the Belgian Hockey League and the Dutch Eredivisie. The Belgian National League is the second level league. The top Belgian teams also participate in the North Sea Cup, which has teams from Belgium and the Netherlands, but the league has disbanded in 2012. Since 1986, the Belgian Cup has also been contested. The Belgian Supercup was held from 2002-2006. Belgium has men's, women's and junior national teams.
Bosnia and Herzegovina	IIHF member. 4 rinks. 187 registered players. The Bosnia and Herzegovina Hockey League, founded in 2002, is the country's top league. Teams are HK Bosna, HK Stari Grad, HK Ilidža 2010, and HK Alfa. A national championship was first held in 2002-03, but was not contested again until 2009-10. It has been contested yearly since then. The Bosnian Cup (also known as the Jaroslav Jandourek Cup) has been held since 2010. The Bosnia and Herzegovina national team participated in the Division III qualification in 2008, losing 10:1 to Greece, and 18:1 to Armenia. The result was later changed to a 5:0 forfeit victory for Bosnia, after it was found that Armenia had used several ineligible players. The Bosnians returned to participate in both 2015 and 2016 IIHF World Championship Division III. They also have an under-18 national team, which participated in the U18 World Championships in 2003 and 2004.
Bulgaria	IIHF member. 9 rinks. 929 registered players. The Bulgarian Hockey League, founded in 1952, is the country's top level league. The Balkan League, which also consists of teams from Greece, is the amateur second level of hockey. Prior to the founding of the Bulgarian Hockey League, various tournaments were played. From 1927-1934, the Bulgarian Tournament Cup was held. From 1935-1943, the BFKHL Cup was held (the 1944 edition was not completed because of WWII). In 1949 the Championship on the occasion of V congress of BCP was held. In 1950 and 1951, the Metropolitan Championship was held. The Bulgarian Cup has been contested since 1954. Bulgaria has men's, women's and junior national teams.
Croatia	IIHF member. 6 rinks. 600 registered players. The Croatian Ice Hockey League, founded in 1991, is the country's national league. KHL Medveščak Zagreb participates in the multi-national Kontinental Hockey League. KHL Medveščak Zagreb II and KHL Mladost participate in the Slohokej Liga, which has teams from Croatia, Slovenia, and Austria. Croatia has men's, women's and junior national teams.
Cyprus	There are ice rinks in Famagusta and Limassol, which is in Northern Cyprus. There are two teams, the Limassol Solar Bears and Famagusta Ice Crows, which came from Northern Cyprus.
Czech Republic	IIHF member. 208 rinks. 120,920 registered players. The Czech Extraliga, founded in 1993, is the top level league, the 1. Liga is the second level league, and the 2. Liga is the third level league. The Tipsport Hockey Cup has been contested since 2000. The Czech Republic has men's, women's and junior national teams.
Denmark	IIHF member. 26 rinks. 4,905 registered players. The Metal Ligaen, founded in 1954, is the top level league, and 1. Division is the second level league. The Danish Cup has been held since 1997. Denmark has men's, women's and junior national teams.
Estonia	IIHF member. 22 rinks. 1,043 registered players. The Meistriliiga, founded in 1934, is the country's national league. It was still contested, even when Estonia was part of the Soviet Union. In the 2006-07 season, a second level league, the Esiliiga was also held. From 1996-1998, and in 2007, the Estonian Cup was contested. In 2008, the Estonian Supercup was held. Estonia has men's and junior national teams.
Finland	IIHF member. 323 rinks. 73,374 registered players. Liiga (formerly known as the SM-Liiga) is the top level league, the Mestis is the second level league, the Suomi-sarja is the third level league, and II-Divisioona is the fourth level league. Jokerit Helsinki participates in the multi-national Kontinental Hockey League since 2014. The SM-sarja was the top level league from 1927-1975, before it was replaced by Liiga. In 1964 and 1965, the Finnish Cup was contested. Finland has men's, women's and junior national teams.
France	IIHF member. 126 rinks. 21,667 registered players. The Ligue Magnus, founded in 1906, is the top level league, Division 1 is the second level league, Division 2 is the third level league, and Division 3 is the fourth and lowest level league. The Coupe de France was held from 1975-1978, 1987, 1994, and yearly since 2000. The Coupe de la Ligue and Match des Champions have both been held since 2007. France has men's, women's and junior national teams.
Georgia	IIHF member. 5 rinks. 649 registered players. There was a 4-team league known as the Georgian Ice Hockey League, that operated in the 2007-08 season. Four teams that participated in the league were Ice Knights, Grey Wolves, Mimino, and the Fiery Crusaders. In 1962, the Georgian SSR participated in the Winter Spartakiad in Sverdlovsk. The Georgia national team did not play any games until 2010, when they played South Africa, losing 8:1, and Armenia, losing 22:1. Georgia has men's national team.
Germany	IIHF member. 261 rinks. 20,938 registered players. The Deutsche Eishockey Liga, founded in 1994, is the top level league, the 2. Eishockey-Bundesliga is the second level league, the Oberliga is the third level league, and the Regionalliga is the fourth level league. The German Ice Hockey Championship was contested from 1912-1948. The Oberliga, currently the third level league, was the top level league in West Germany from 1948-1958, and the Bundesliga was the top level league from 1958-1994. The German Cup (Deutscher Eishockey-Pokal) has been held yearly since 2002. Germany has men's, women's and junior national teams.
United Kingdom	IIHF member. 68 rinks. 8,162 registered players. The Elite Ice Hockey League (EIHL) is the country's top level league, the English Premier League is the second level league, and the English National League is the third level league. The Scottish National League is the top level league in Scotland. The EIHL has teams from England, Scotland, Northern Ireland and Wales. Prior to the EIHL, the British National League was the top level league from 1954-1960, the British Championship was the national championship from 1966-1982, the British Hockey League was the top level league from 1982-1996, and the Ice Hockey Superleague was the top level league from 1996-2003. The English Cup was held in 1999, 2001, and 2002. Great Britain has men's, women's and junior national teams. The Scottish Cup has been held since 1997, the Scottish Autumn Cup since 2001, and the Scottish Spring Cup from 2001-2006.
Greece	IIHF member. 3 rinks but no IIHF standard rink exist. 200 registered players. The Greek Championship has been contested on-and-off since 1989. Greece is unable to compete in any IIHF tournaments because they cannot fulfill the minimum standard of having one operational indoor rink. Their last appearance was the 2013 IIHF World Championship Division III. Greece has men's and junior national teams.
Hungary	IIHF member. 59 rinks. 5,889 registered players. The top seven Hungarian teams participates in the multi-national MOL Liga. The OB I bajnokság is the country's top league, and the OB I/B. bajnokság is the second level league. The Hungarian Cup has been held since 1965, and in 1996 and 2008, the Hungarian Supercup was also held. Hungary has men's, women's and junior national teams.
Iceland	IIHF member. 3 rinks. 566 registered players. The Icelandic Hockey League has been the country's national league since 1991. Before that, an Icelandic Championship was occasionally contested. Iceland has men's, women's and junior national teams.
Ireland	IIHF member. Currently no IIHF standard rinks. 326 registered players. The Irish Ice Hockey League was the country's national league from 2007-2010. Before the IIHL, a national championship was held in some years. Ireland is unable to compete in any IIHF tournaments, with the closure of the Dundalk Ice Dome and they no longer meet their minimum participation standards. Their last appearance was the 2013 IIHF World Championship Division III. Ireland has men's, women's and junior national teams.
Italy	IIHF member. 70 rinks. 5,358 registered players. The Serie A, founded in 1924, is the top level league, the Serie A2 is the second level league, and the Serie C is the third level league. The Coppa Italia has held from 1973-1974, 1991, and 1998, before becoming an annual competition in 2001. Since 2001, the Supercoppa Italiana has also been held. Italy has men's, women's and junior national teams.
Latvia	IIHF member. 19 rinks. 7,000 registered players. The Latvian Hockey League, first contested from 1931-1944, and then again from 1991 onward, is the country's national league. The country's top team, Dinamo Riga, participates in the multi-national Kontinental Hockey League. The Latvian Cup has been held four times, in 1995, 1999, 2007, and 2008. Latvia has men's, women's and junior national teams.
Liechtenstein	IIHF member. Currently no IIHF standard rinks. 45 registered players. There is a team, the EHC Vaduz-Schellenberg, that participates in the Swiss 4. Liga. Due to lack of ice rinks in Liechtenstein, the team is based in Widnau, Switzerland. The national team played two games against Luxembourg, losing 7:1 in 2003, and 4:2 in 2007. Liechtenstein has men's and inline national teams.
Lithuania	IIHF member. 9 rinks. 2,466 registered players. The Lithuania Hockey League, first contested from 1926-1942, and then again since 1991, is the country's top level league. The Lithuanian Cup was held only in the year 2000. Lithuania has men's and junior national teams. Notable players from Lithuania played in the NHL are Darius Kasparaitis and Dainius Zubrus.
Luxembourg	IIHF member. 3 rinks. 432 registered players. The country's top team, Tornado Luxembourg, plays in the fourth level French league, the French Division 3. The Luxembourg Championship was played on-and-off from 1993–2003. The Luxembourg Cup, was also contested yearly from 1993–2003. The Cup has also been held in the 2006–07, 2010–11, and 2011–12 seasons. Luxembourg has men's and junior national teams.
North Macedonia	IIHF member. 7 rinks. 119 registered players. In 2011, the national team played a game against a Bulgarian team, Red Star Sofia, losing 4:1. In 2012, HK Skopje played three games in the multi-national Total TV Hockey League, losing 5:4 to Iraklis Thessaloniki, and twice to HK Bosna, 3:1 and 9:2. Macedonia has men's and inline national teams.
Moldova	IIHF member. Currently no IIHF standard rinks and no registered players. There are two ice rinks in two cities; one in Chisinau (Ice Bravo) and one in Tiraspol (Snejinka). In 2009-10, Dinamo Chisinau participated in the Romanian U12 League, and in 2010-11, they participated in the Romanian U14 League. In 2010, Platina Chisinau joined the Romanian U18 League.
Netherlands	IIHF member. 28 rinks. 4,232 registered players. The BeNe League, founded in 2015, is the top level league following the merger between the Belgian Hockey League and the Dutch Eredivisie. The Eerste Divisie is the second level league, the Tweede Divisie is the third level league, the Derde Divisie is the fourth level league, and the Vierde Divisie is the fifth level league. The Dutch Cup was held in 1938 and 1939, and then annually since 1971. The Dutch Supercup was held in 1998 only. The Netherlands has men's, women's and junior national teams.
Norway	IIHF member. 54 rinks. 10,270 registered players. The Fjordkraft-ligaen, founded in 1934, is the top level league, the 1. Divisjon is the second level league, the 2. Divisjon is the third level league, the 3. Divisjon is the fourth level league, and the 4. Divisjon is the fifth level league. Norway has men's, women's and junior national teams.
Poland	IIHF member. 25 rinks. 3,600 registered players. The Polish Hockey League, founded in 1926, is the top level league, and the Polish 1. Liga is the second level league. The Polish Cup was first held in 1970 and 1971, and has been contested annually since 2000. Poland has men's, women's and junior national teams.
Portugal	IIHF member. There is an ice rink in Lisbon. 94 registered players. There are three teams, the Viseu Lobos, Inline All-Stars, and Serta Vikings competed for the national championship in 2001. A repeat of the championship has not occurred. The Portugal national team played three unofficial games against a team made up of Portuguese immigrants from the United States and Canada in 2000. They lost all three games to the First Portuguese Canadian Cultural Centre, 18:6, 21:5, and 15:11.
Romania	IIHF member. 10 rinks. 1,562 registered players. The Romanian Hockey League, founded in 1923, is the top level league in the country. The Romanian Cup has been contested since 1969. Romania has men's, women's and junior national teams.
Russia	IIHF member. 3,249 rinks. 110,624 registered players. The Kontinental Hockey League (KHL) is the top level multi-national league. The Vysshaya Liga is the second level league, and the Russian Hockey League (formerly the Pervaya Liga) is the third level league. Russia has men's, women's and junior national teams. Before the KHL was founded in 2008, the International Hockey League was the top level league from 1992–1996, and the Superleague was the top level league from 1996–2008. For more information on this country's ice hockey activities, see Ice hockey in Russia.
Serbia	IIHF member. 4 rinks. 646 registered players. The Serbian Hockey League, founded in 1991, is the country's national league. The Serbian Cup has been held three times, in 1995 and 1996 as the Yugoslav Cup, and in 2007. Serbia's top team, HK Partizan Belgrade, also participated in the multi-national Slohokej Liga. Serbia has men's and junior national teams.
Slovakia	IIHF member. 79 rinks. 10,727 registered players. The Slovak Extraliga, founded in 1993, is the top-level league, the 1. Liga is the second-level league, and the 2. Liga is the third-level league. Teams from Hungary and Poland have previously featured in Slovak league system. Slovakia has men's, women's and junior national teams.
Slovenia	IIHF member. 7 rinks. 1,114 registered players. Slovenian teams have participated in the multi-national Slohokej Liga since 2009. At the end of the year, there is a Slovenian Championship contested to decide the Slovenian national champion. The Slovenian Championship has been held since 1991. The Slovenian Cup was held in 1996, and in January and September 2000. The Slovenian Supercup was only held in 1999. Slovenia has men's, women's and junior national teams. The Slovenia national team qualified for the 2014 Winter Olympics in Sochi.
Spain	IIHF member. 11 rinks. 1,080 registered players. The Liga Nacional de Hockey Hielo is the top level league in the country. It was founded in 1972. The Copa del Rey has also been contested since the 1972-73 season. Spain has men's, women's and junior national teams.
Sweden	IIHF member. 498 rinks. 62,701 registered players. The Swedish Hockey League (formerly known as the Elitserien) is the top level league, the HockeyAllsvenskan is the second level league, and the Swedish Division 1 are the 3rd through 6th level leagues. From 1922-1952, there was a Swedish Championship played alongside the national league. In the year 1922, the Träningsserien was the top level league, from 1923-1927, it was the Class I, from 1928-1935, it was the Elitserien, and from 1935-1944, it was the Svenska Serien. The Swedish Division 1 was the top level league from 1944-1975, when it was replaced by the Elitserien. Sweden has men's, women's and junior national teams.
Switzerland	IIHF member. 157 rinks. 27,528 registered players. The National League is the top level league, the Swiss League is the second level league and the MyHockey League is the third level league. The Swiss 1. Liga, 2. Liga, 3. Liga, and 4. Liga make up the Regio League, which comprises the 4th through 7th level Swiss leagues. Before the founding of the National League A in 1937, there were championships with and without imports allowed. The Swiss National Championship with no imports allowed, existed from 1909-1937, and the Swiss International Championship, with imports, existed from 1915-1933. The Swiss Cup was held from 1957-1966. Switzerland has men's, women's and junior national teams.
Turkey	IIHF member. 32 rinks. 1,196 registered players. The Turkish Ice Hockey Super League, founded in 1992, is the top level league, and the Turkish Ice Hockey League is the second level league. Turkey has men's, women's and junior national teams.
Ukraine	IIHF member. 27 rinks. 5,895 registered players. The Ukrainian Hockey League, founded in 1992, is the top-level league in the country. The Ukrainian Cup was held in 2007. Donbass Donetsk was founded in 2005, and participated in the multi-national Kontinental Hockey League until 2014. Ukraine has men's, women's and junior national teams.

== Former countries ==
Former countries played ice hockey through the years.

Country	Information
Bohemia	They were an IIHF member. Was the country that existed until 1918 around the present day Czech Republic. The Bohemian Hockey League was played in 1909, 1911, and 1912. The Bohemia national team participated in international matches between 1909 and 1914. They won the European Championships in 1911, 1912 (later annulled), and 1914.
CIS	The Unified Team represented the former Soviet Union countries at the 1992 Winter Olympics and the 1992 IIHF World Junior Championships. They won the gold medal in ice hockey at both events.
Czechoslovakia	They were an IIHF member. They competed in the World Championships and the Olympic Games. Czechoslovakia split into Slovakia and the Czech Republic in 1993. The Czechoslovak Extraliga was the top level league from 1936-1992. Czechoslovakia has men's and junior national teams.
England	The English Ice Hockey Association (EIHA) was formed in 1982. The England national team played its first game in 1909, a friendly game against Scotland, which they won 11-1. During its early years, it participated in numerous international tournaments. Since the 1950s, the team has mainly played games against the Scotland national team. Their last international game, losing to them 5-4 in 1993.
East Germany	They were an IIHF member. They competed in the World Championships and occasionally in the Olympics. East Germany unified with West Germany in 1990. The DDR-Oberliga was the country's top league from 1949-1990. From 1970 on, the league consisted of only two teams, SC Dynamo Berlin and SG Dynamo Weisswasser. The DDR-Bestenermittlung was formed as the unofficial second league in 1970 by teams kicked out of the Oberliga, and from the former second level league, the Gruppenliga. East Germany has men's national team.
West Germany	They were an IIHF member. They competed in the World Championships and the Olympic Games. West Germany unified with East Germany in 1990. West Germany had a very similar league system to present day Germany. West Germany has men's and junior national teams.
Scotland	The Scottish Ice Hockey (formerly the Scottish Ice Hockey Association, SIHA) is responsible for the administration of all ice hockey in Scotland, with the exception of the country's Elite Ice Hockey League teams (currently Edinburgh Capitals, Braehead Clan, Fife Flyers and Dundee Stars). The Scotland national team played its first game in 1909, and 11-1 loss to England. The team has mostly played against the England national team. Their last international game, defeating them 5-4 in 1993.
Serbia and Montenegro	They were an IIHF member and competed in the World Championships. In 2006, Serbia and Montenegro broke up into Serbia (as its own country) and Montenegro (as its own country). The national league consisted of only Serbian teams, and was identical to the Serbian Hockey League. Serbia and Montenegro has men's and junior national teams.
Soviet Union	They were an IIHF member. They competed in the World Championships and the Olympic Games. The Soviet Union broke up into 15 different countries in 1991. The Soviet League (also known as the Vysshaya Liga) was the top level league from 1946-1992. The Pervaya Liga was the second level league, the Vtoraya Liga was the third level league, and the Class B was the fourth level league some years. The Soviet Cup was contested 21 times between 1951 until 1989. The Soviet Union has men's and junior national teams.
Yugoslavia	They were an IIHF member. They competed in World Championships and occasionally in the Olympics. Yugoslavia broke up into 5 (eventually 7) countries in 1992. The Yugoslav Ice Hockey League was the top level league from 1936-1991. The Yugoslav Cup was held from the 1965-66 season until 1991. Yugoslavia has men's and junior national teams.

== See also ==
- List of ice hockey leagues
- List of members of the International Ice Hockey Federation
- List of national ice hockey teams
