= Graeme Townshend =

Canadian retired ice hockey right winger (born 1965)

- Born: October 23, 1965 (age 61) Kingston, Jamaica
- Height: 6 ft 2 in (188 cm)
- Weight: 225 lb (102 kg; 16 st 1 lb)
- Position: Right wing
- Shot: Right
- Played for: Boston Bruins; New York Islanders; Ottawa Senators
- NHL draft: Undrafted
- Playing career: 1989–1999

Graeme Scott Townshend (born October 23, 1965) is a Jamaican-born Canadian retired ice hockey right winger. He was the first Jamaican-born player to play in the National Hockey League (NHL), and played 45 games in the NHL between 1990 and 1993. The rest of his career, which lasted from 1989 to 1999, was spent in the minor leagues.

== Playing career ==
Prior to starting his professional career, Townshend played four seasons at RPI in ECAC Hockey, serving as a team captain during the 1987–88 season. He also played for the Mimico Monarchs of the Central Junior "B" Hockey League.

Townshend started his National Hockey League career with the Boston Bruins. He scored his first NHL goal on February 2, 1991, in Boston's 6–2 loss at Pittsburgh. He also played with the New York Islanders and Ottawa Senators. His NHL career lasted from 1990 to 1994.

He played in the American Hockey League (AHL) for the Maine Mariners, Capital District Islanders, and Prince Edward Island Senators. Townshend also played in the International Hockey League with the Houston Aeros, Minnesota Moose, and Utah Grizzlies and in the Western Professional Hockey League for the Lake Charles Ice Pirates. His professional playing career lasted for 10 seasons. Townshend was distinguished by the International Hockey League and the Western Professional Hockey League as the Man of The Year for his leadership on and off the ice and for his contributions to his community.

== Post-playing career ==
After his retirement, Townshend coached professional hockey for the Macon Whoopee of the Central Hockey League and the Greensboro Generals of the ECHL.

For four years, he served as the player development coordinator for the NHL's San Jose Sharks (one of only 3 in the NHL). His primary responsibility was to prepare all Sharks players and prospects with the skills required for the "new" NHL, most notably, enhancing their skating skills.

On September 9, 2008, he was hired as the skating coach for the NHL's Toronto Maple Leafs. He held the position until the end of the 2012 season.

In December 2011, Townshend was approached by E. J. Phillipps, co-founder of the Jamaican Olympic Ice Hockey Federation (JOIHF) and asked to serve as its first head coach. As a head coach, he organized the first player identification and tryout camp for the new organization in August 2014. Townshend continues to be a head coach of the Jamaica men's national junior team, with aspirations of making it to the Winter Olympics.

Townshend was inducted into the Canadian Black Hockey Hall of Fame.

== Personal life ==
Townshend was born in Kingston, Jamaica, but was raised in Toronto, Ontario, Canada when his family moved there in 1969. He has a brother, Kurt, who was also born in Kingston, Jamaica, and sister, (Canadian filmmaker) Laurie, who was born in Toronto, Ontario. He is married to Lori-Ann Townshend.

== Career statistics ==
=== Regular season and playoffs ===
			Regular season					Playoffs
Season	Team	League	GP	G	A	Pts	PIM	GP	G	A	Pts	PIM
1984–85	Mimico Monarchs	COJHL	35	22	22	44	93	25	14	11	25	—
1985–86	Rensselaer Polytechnic Institute	ECAC	29	1	7	8	52	—	—	—	—	—
1986–87	Rensselaer Polytechnic Institute	ECAC	29	6	1	7	56	—	—	—	—	—
1987–88	Rensselaer Polytechnic Institute	ECAC	32	6	14	22	62	—	—	—	—	—
1988–89	Rensselaer Polytechnic Institute	ECAC	31	6	16	22	62	—	—	—	—	—
1988–89	Maine Mariners	AHL	5	2	1	3	11	—	—	—	—	—
1989–90	Boston Bruins	NHL	4	0	0	0	7	—	—	—	—	—
1989–90	Maine Mariners	AHL	64	15	13	28	162	—	—	—	—	—
1990–91	Boston Bruins	NHL	18	2	5	7	12	—	—	—	—	—
1990–91	Maine Mariners	AHL	46	16	10	26	119	2	2	0	2	4
1991–92	New York Islanders	NHL	7	1	2	3	0	—	—	—	—	—
1991–92	Capital District Islanders	AHL	61	14	23	37	94	4	0	2	2	0
1992–93	New York Islanders	NHL	2	0	0	0	0	—	—	—	—	—
1992–93	Capital District Islanders	AHL	67	29	21	50	45	2	0	0	0	0
1993–94	Ottawa Senators	NHL	14	0	0	0	9	—	—	—	—	—
1993–94	Prince Edward Island Senators	AHL	56	16	13	29	107	—	—	—	—	—
1994–95	Houston Aeros	IHL	71	19	21	40	204	4	0	2	2	22
1995–96	Minnesota Moose	IHL	3	0	0	0	0	—	—	—	—	—
1995–96	Houston Aeros	IHL	63	21	11	32	97	—	—	—	—	—
1996–97	Houston Aeros	IHL	74	21	15	36	68	3	0	0	0	2
1997–98	Utah Grizzlies	IHL	1	0	0	0	0	—	—	—	—	—
1997–98	Houston Aeros	IHL	1	0	0	0	0	—	—	—	—	—
1997–98	Lake Charles Ice Pirates	WPHL	68	43	44	87	67	4	0	4	4	14
1998–99	Lake Charles Ice Pirates	WPHL	60	28	29	57	113	11	7	3	10	12
AHL totals			299	92	81	173	538	8	2	2	4	4
NHL totals			45	3	7	10	28	—	—	—	—	—
