= 2007–08 Georgian Ice Hockey League season =

The 2007–08 Georgian Ice Hockey League season was the first season of the Georgian Ice Hockey League, the top level of ice hockey in Georgia. Four teams participated in the league, and the Grey Wolves Tbilisi won the championship.

== Regular season ==
	Club	GP	W	OTW	OTL	L	GF–GA	Pts
1.	Grey Wolves Tbilisi	6	5	0	1	0	33:20	16
2.	Ice Knights Tbilisi	6	3	1	0	2	29:18	11
3.	Bakurianis Mimino	6	2	0	0	4	14:19	6
4.	Fiery Crusaders Tbilisi	6	1	0	0	5	10:29	3
