= Ice hockey in Russia =

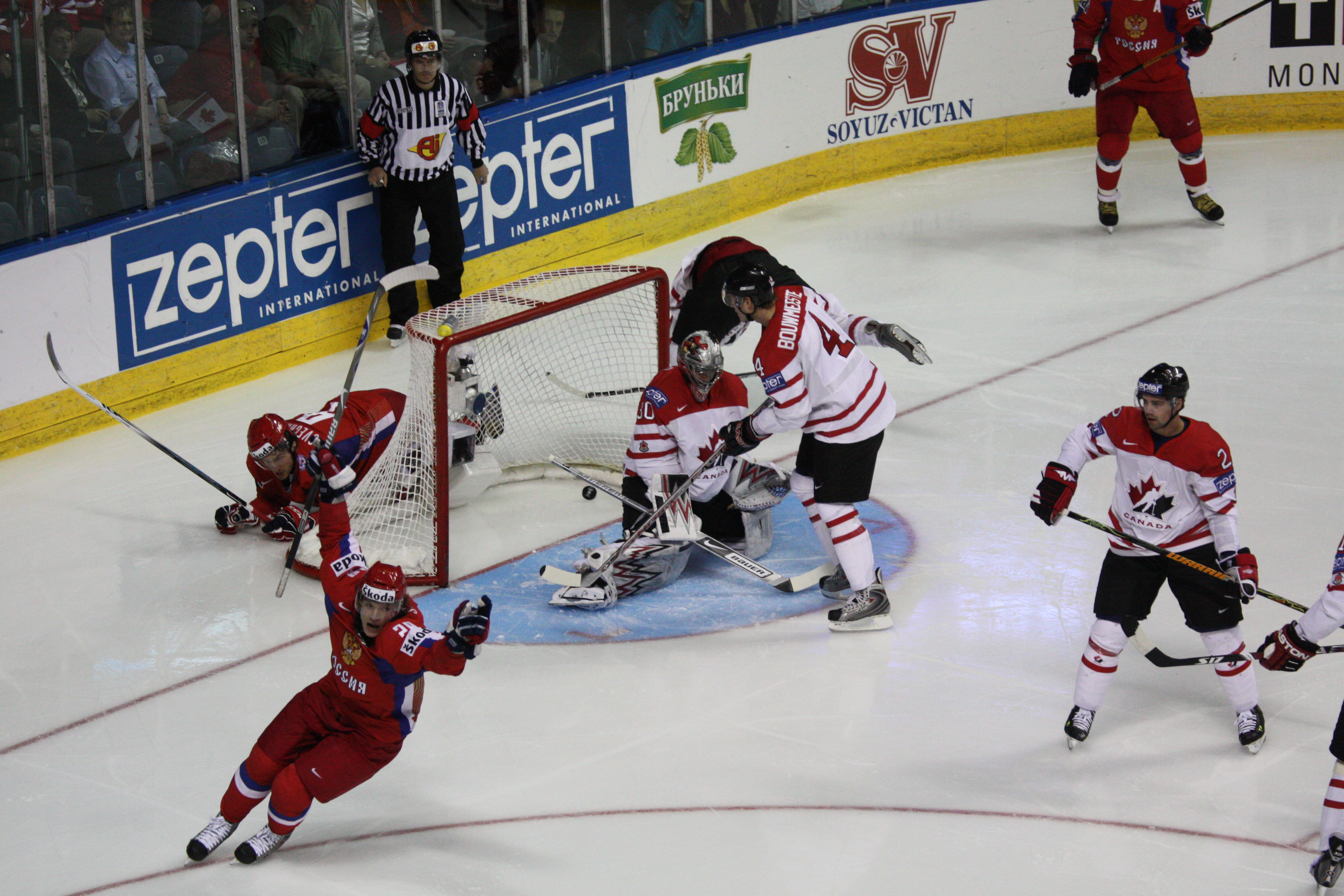
- Alexander Semin scores the first goal in the 2008 World Championship Final.
- Country: Russia
- Governing body: Ice Hockey Federation of Russia
- National teams: Men's national team; Women's national team
- First played: 1932

National competitions
- Kontinental Hockey League

Club competitions
- Gagarin Cup

International competitions
- IIHF World Championships; Winter Olympics; World Cup

Ice hockey in Russia is one of the most popular sports in the country.

== History ==
In 1908, representatives of Russian ice hockey received an invitation to visit Paris to discuss the possibility of uniting hockey fans, along with France, Great Britain, Switzerland, Belgium, and Germany. On 15 May 1908, the First Congress of the International Ice Hockey Federation was formed without Russia and Germany.

The Russian Hockey Federation was added to the Ligue Internationale de Hockey sur Glace (LIHG) (as the IIHF was known then) on 12 February 1911, as the seventh member.

The USSR ice hockey championship began to be played out in 1946. At first, the All-Union hockey section was organizing the championships. Since 1 July 1959, the organization has become known as the USSR Hockey Federation, which has united the leadership of hockey with the ball and hockey with the puck. On 17 October 1967, the Federation was divided into the Federation of Ice Hockey (USSR) and the USSR Ice Hockey Federation.

Nominally hockey in Russia was engaged in the Federation of Hockey Russian SFSR, formed in 1959. The Federation of Hockey of the Russian SFSR / Russia (FHR) was established on 12 November 1991. On 19 January 1992, the FHR officially became the successor to the USSR Hockey Federation.

On 22 May 1992, former Soviet player Vladimir Petrov was elected president of the FHR. On 8 April 1994, Petrov was removed from the post of president, Valentin Sych was elected the new president. On 21 April 1997, the president of FHR, Valentin Sych was killed. On 30 May 1997, Alexander Steblin was elected the new president. On 21 April 2006, Steblin resigned, and former legendary Soviet goaltender three-time Olympic champion Vladislav Tretiak was elected president of the FHR.

=== Domestic leagues ===
On 26 March 2009, at the joint meeting of the clubs of the Kontinental Hockey League (KHL), the Russian Hockey Federation and the leadership of the KHL, the Youth Hockey League.

On 23 March 2010, at the joint meeting of the clubs of the Higher League, the leadership of the Russian Hockey Federation and the Kontinental Hockey League created the Higher Hockey League.

On 21 August 2015, at an extraordinary conference of the FHR, decisions were made on changes in the structure of the management of the Federation. Instead of the FHR Council and the executive committee of the FHR, the Federation Board was established. Arkady Rotenberg was elected chairman of the board.

Ice hockey was further popularized by Canadians introduced to the Soviet Union in 1932. During the Soviet Union period the Soviet Championship League was the premier ice hockey league. After the fall of communism it was followed by the Russian Superleague and then the Kontinental Hockey League.

Anatoly Tarasov is considered the father of Russian ice hockey.

== National team ==
The Soviet Union entered its first Winter Olympics tournament in 1956, and was successful from the start, much due to the players having an earlier experience of bandy, also called "Russian hockey". The Soviet Union would dominate the hockey world championship and Olympic tournaments from the 1950s to 1980s. The Soviet Union enjoyed a position where it could use its best players while Canada and many others were barred from doing that as their players were classified as professionals.

During the height of the Cold War in the 1980s, many Russian hockey players defected to the United States to play in the National Hockey League (NHL) with such notable players as Viacheslav Fetisov, Alexander Mogilny, and Sergei Federov.

On the international stage, Russia considers Canada its major hockey rival.

During this period the Russian national team, having won the 1993 World Championship, for a long time remained without medals at all. And only in recent years, the Russian team began to return its former strength. And if at the World Championships in Moscow in 2007 Russians stumbled in the semifinals, then in 2008, the year of the official 100th anniversary of hockey, they regained the title of world champions after defeating the Canadians in Quebec. A dramatic final match, during which Russia lost 2: 4, ended in victory in overtime with a score of 5: 4. A year later at the 2009 championship in Bern, the Russian team confirmed its title, again defeating the national team of Canada in the final with a score of 2: 1.

At the 2010 World Championships, held in Cologne, the Russian team took only second place, losing in the finals of the Czech team with a score of 1: 2. In 2012, the Russian team won gold for the fourth time. In 2014, she became a five-time champion, winning all of her matches, like in 2008, 2009 and 2012. In the final match, the Russian team defeated the Finnish national team with a score of 5: 2.

Russian hockey differs from Russian football in the development of regional clubs. On the map of Russia there are strong in the economic and organizational plan hockey centers: Novosibirsk, Omsk, Magnitogorsk, Yaroslavl, Ufa, Kazan, Chelyabinsk.

After the Russian invasion of Ukraine in February 2022, the International Ice Hockey Federation suspended Russia and Belarus from all levels of competition.
