= Ice hockey in Croatia =

- Country: Croatia
- Governing body: Croatian Ice Hockey Federation
- National team(s): Men's national team; Women's national team

National competitions
- Croatian Ice Hockey League

Ice hockey has been played in Croatia at least since the late 19th century. It became organised on the national level in 1935 with the establishment of the Croatian Ice Hockey Federation, and at this period Croatian teams were playing in the Yugoslav Ice Hockey League. During the 1960s, Group B of the 1966 World Ice Hockey Championships took place in Zagreb, and KHL Medveščak Zagreb became a leading team, winning the national championship on several occasions. The breakup of Yugoslavia in 1991 led to the formation of the Croatian Ice Hockey League.

== Prior to World War II ==
On November 9, 1935 the Association for Skating and Ice Hockey was founded in Zagreb, although ice hockey in Croatia had been inherent for some 30 years, considering that Franjo Bučar, the father of Croatian sport, had founded skating section in 1894.

First game on natural ice was played in the winter of 1916 between HAŠK (Croatian Academic Sport Club) and PHŠD (First Croatian Sport Society). In 1922, the Zagreb Winter Sub-federation was founded which included skating, ice hockey and alpine skiing.

The first game by Canadian rules was played on February 3, 1924 between HAŠK and ZKD (Zagreb Skating Society) on ice next to the former Esplanade Hotel, which HAŠK won with 4:1.

The real uplift of the Croatian ice hockey was in 1930 when 3 clubs were founded, but as sections within the major sports companies: Marathon, Concordia and Karlovačko Športsko Udruženje. Other clubs were Sisak founded in 1931 as a part of Slavija Sports Society and KHL Varaždin founded in 1935.

In the late 1930s hockey teams from Croatia participated in the Yugoslav Hockey League. Initially the best clubs from various republics were promoted to the playoffs. Croatia hence had its own division in this league with clubs from Zagreb, Sisak, Karlovac and Varaždin.

== After World War II ==
A period of years after the Second World War is considered as the most prosperous for Croatian ice hockey and is associated with the name of Dragutin Friedrich. In 1946 he founded KHL Mladost which was a champion of SFR Yugoslavia in 1947 and 1949.

In 1947, SD Zagreb was founded and the club won the championship of Yugoslavia in 1956. In the early 1960s due to the crisis and the lack of funds for this sport, KHL Zagreb and the new KHL Medveščak Zagreb merged and the new club continued to work under the name KHL Medveščak. The same club got the first artificial ice in Croatia in Šalata.

After that in 1966 Zagreb got the organization of a World Championship, group B. Due to completion of Dom Sportova in 1972 players got second artificial ice and in 1984 Croatian Ice Hockey Federation became independent.

In 1986, KHL Zagreb was established.

Then, with significant economic support, KHL Medveščak won the championship of Yugoslavia in 1989, 1990 and 1991 and Yugoslav cup in 1988, 1989, 1990 and 1991.

== Post 1991 ==
With disintegration of Yugoslavia Croatian Ice Hockey League was established and since 1991 it operates under its present name. In 1992 Croatian Ice Hockey Federation became a member of IIHF.
