= List of South African ice hockey champions =

This is a list of the South African champions in the sport of ice hockey.

== Champions ==
1962: Lions Johannesburg; 1963: Not contested; 1964: Wembley Lions Johannesburg; 1965: Swiss Bears Johannesburg; 1966: Swiss Bears Johannesburg; 1967: Not contested; 1968: Swiss Bears Johannesburg; 1969: Canadian Hush Poppies Johannesburg; 1970: Maple Leafs Johannesburg; 1971: Edelweis Johannesburg; 1972: Swiss Bears Johannesburg; 1973: Swiss Bears Johannesburg; 1974: Jungle Jets Johannesburg; 1975: Jungle Jets Johannesburg; 1976: Maple Leafs Johannesburg; 1977: Maple Leafs Johannesburg; 1978: North Stars Pretoria; 1979: Flyers Roodenpoort; 1980: Flyers Roodenpoort; 1981: Flyers Roodenpoort; 1982: Bullets Benoni; 1983: North Stars Pretoria; 1984: North Stars Pretoria; 1985: Johannesburg Bullets; 1986: Flyers Roodenpoort	1987: Flyers Johannesburg; 1988: Flyers Johannesburg; 1989: Johannesburg Bullets; 1990: Johannesburg Bullets; 1991: Flyers Roodenpoort; 1992: Flyers Roodenpoort; 1993: Flyers Roodenpoort; 1994: Can-Ams Johannesburg; 1995: Can-Ams Johannesburg; 1996: Can-Ams Johannesburg; 1997: Pretoria Capitals; 1998: Pretoria Capitals; 1999: Wildcats Krugersdorp; 2000: Wildcats Krugersdorp; 2001: Ama-Horney Pretoria; 2002: Wildcats Krugersdorp; 2003: Wildcats Krugersdorp; 2004: Not contested; 2005: Ama-Horney Pretoria; 2006: Warriors Pretoria; 2007: Wildcats Krugersdorp; 2008: Scorpions Kempton Park; 2009: Scorpions Kempton Park; 2010: Gauteng; 2011: Gauteng Miners; 2012: Cape Town Penguins; 2013: Cape Town Penguins; 2014: Pretoria Capitals; 2015: Kempton Park Wildcats; 2016: Kempton Park Wildcats; 2017: Kempton Park Sabres
