= 2010–11 Kyrgyzstan Championship (ice hockey) =

The 2010-11 Kyrgyzstan Championship was the fourth edition of the Kyrgyzstan Championship. Gornyak Ak-Tuz won the championship by defeating Khan-Tengri Bishkek in the playoff final.

== First round ==
=== Group A ===
- Khan-Tengri Bishkek - Cholpon-Ata Issuk-Kul 11:1
- Cholpon-Ata Issyk-Kul - Arstan Shumkar Bishkek 9:2
- Khan-Tengri Bishkek - Arstan Shumkar Bishkek 4:3

=== Group B ===
- Gornyak Ak-Tuz - Dorodi Ala-Too Naryn 6:3
- Chaek Zhumgal - Dorodi Ala-Too Naryn 4:2
- Gornyak Ak-Tuz - Chaek Zhumgal 0:0

== Playoffs ==
=== Semifinals ===
- Gornyak Ak-Tuz - Arstan Shumkar Bishkek 11:3
- Khan-Tengri Bishkek - Chaek Zhumgal 5:0

=== Final ===
- Gornyak Ak-Tuz - Khan-Tengri Bishkek 15:2
