= 2011–12 Georgian Ice Hockey League season =

The 2011–12 Georgian Ice Hockey League season was the second season of the Georgian Ice Hockey League, the top level of ice hockey in Georgia. Four teams participated in the league, and the Ice Knights Tbilisi won the championship.

== Regular season ==
	Club	GP	W	OTW	OTL	L	GF–GA	Pts
1.	Ice Knights Tbilisi	18	13	0	0	5	54:38	39
2.	Fiery Crusaders Tbilisi	18	8	2	0	8	52:44	28
3.	Grey Wolves Tbilisi	18	7	0	1	10	47:55	22
4.	Bakurianis Mimino	18	6	0	1	11	45:61	19
