= Ice hockey in Italy =

- Country: Italy
- Governing body: Federazione Italiana Sport del Ghiaccio
- National team(s): Men's national team; Women's national team

National competitions
- Serie A

International competitions
- IIHF World Championships; Winter Olympics; World Cup

Ice hockey in Italy is governed by the Federazione Italiana Sport del Ghiaccio. The Serie A was founded in 1925, which was merged with the Inter-National League to become the Alps Hockey League in 2016. The second level Serie B, and the third level Serie C operate below it. Italian men's, women's, man's U-20, man's U-18, and women's U-18 national teams participate at the IIHF World Championships. Italy has been a member of the IIHF since January 24, 1924.
