= Ice hockey in Japan =

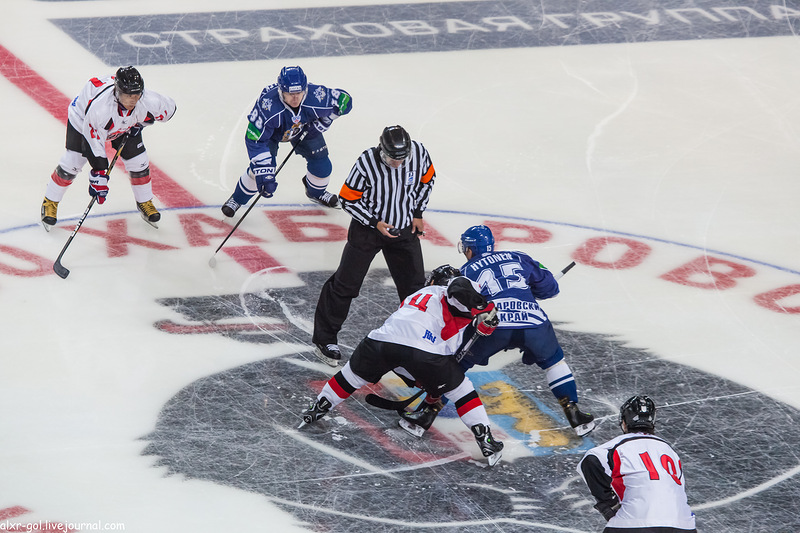
- Exhibition game Amur Khabarovsk vs. Japanese national team on August 23, 2012. Face-off at the beginning of the game. Amur forwards Juha-Pekka Hytönen (at right) and Jakub Petružálek.
- Country: Japan
- Governing body: Japan Ice Hockey Federation
- National teams: Men's national team; Women's national team

National competitions
- Asia League Ice Hockey

International competitions
- IIHF World Championships; Winter Olympics; World Cup

Ice hockey remains a relatively minor sport in Japan but has been gradually gaining traction in recent years. While baseball and football (soccer) have long dominated the country's sports scene, ice hockey has maintained a more modest presence since its introduction in the 1920s. The sport is overseen by the Japan Ice Hockey Federation.

== National and International Competitions ==
=== Japan Ice Hockey League ===
From 1966 to 2004, Japan's top domestic competition was the Japan Ice Hockey League (JIHL), which exclusively featured Japanese teams and was limited to six clubs at any one time. The league was eventually replaced by the Asia League to include international teams and foster broader competition.

=== All Japan Ice Hockey Championship ===
Japan also hosts the All Japan Ice hockey Championship, a national cup tournament that dates back to 1933, making it one of the oldest and most enduring sports competitions in the country. Organized annually by the Japan Ice Hockey Federation, the championship brings together four top-level teams to compete for national honors, showcasing some of the best talent in Japanese ice hockey. Its long history reflects the sport's deep-rooted, albeit niche, presence in Japan’s sporting culture. In recognition of the growing participation of women in the sport, a women's edition of the championship was introduced in 1982 and has been held every year since.

=== International competitions ===
The country fields men's, women's, and junior national teams. Notably, the women's national team qualified for both the 2014 Winter Olympics in Sochi and the 2018 Winter Olympics in PyeongChang, South Korea, reflecting the growing development of the sport in Japan.
