= Ice hockey in Denmark =

- Country: Denmark
- Governing body: Danish Ice Hockey Union
- National teams: Men's national team Women's national team

National competitions
- Superisligaen; Danish Division 1

International competitions
- Ice Hockey European Championships; IIHF World Championships; Winter Olympics

Ice hockey in Denmark is a sport that has been growing in popularity in recent years.

== History ==
Denmark has qualified for international ice hockey tournaments since 1949, starting with the World Championships in Stockholm.

Ice hockey in Denmark is governed by the Danish Ice Hockey Union.

== National team ==
A longtime participant in the IIHF World Championships, the Denmark men's national ice hockey team made their first Olympic appearance at the 2022 Winter Olympics in Beijing.

Most notably, at the Danish-co-hosted 2025 IIHF World Championship, Denmark defeated Canada 2–1 in the quarterfinals in what was considered one of the largest upsets in ice hockey history, in the process reaching the World Championship semifinals for the first time in their history.

== Notable players ==
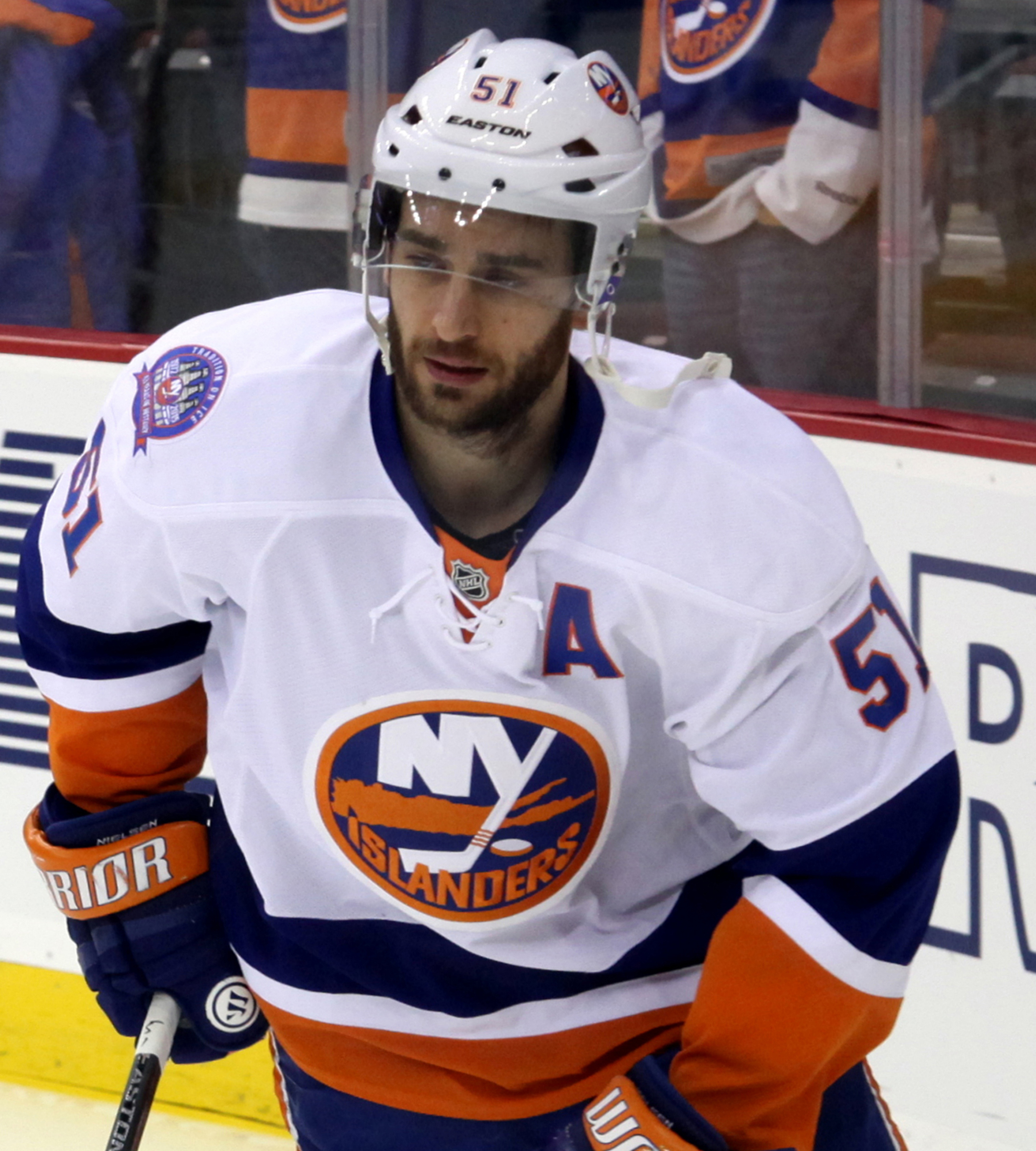
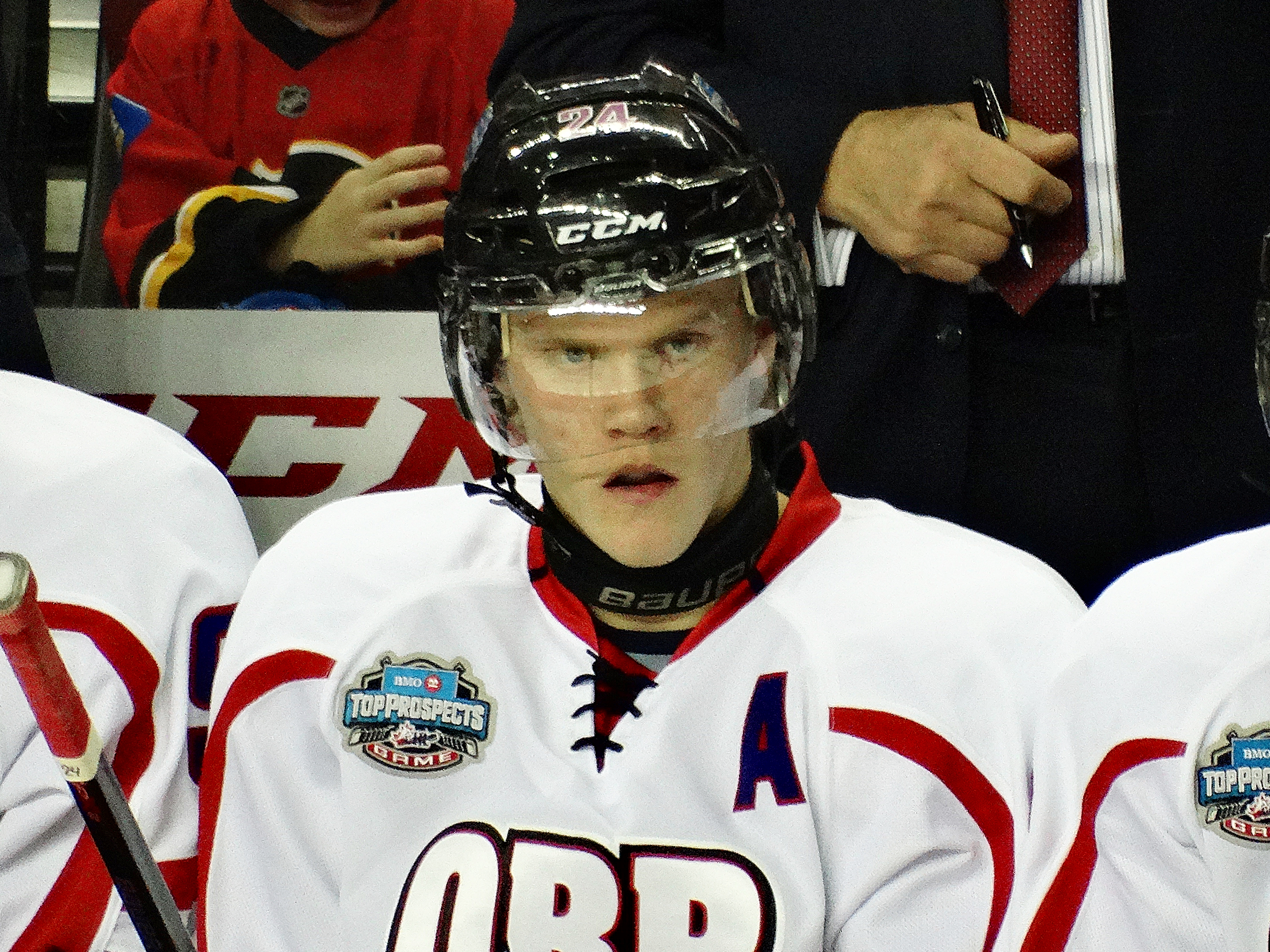
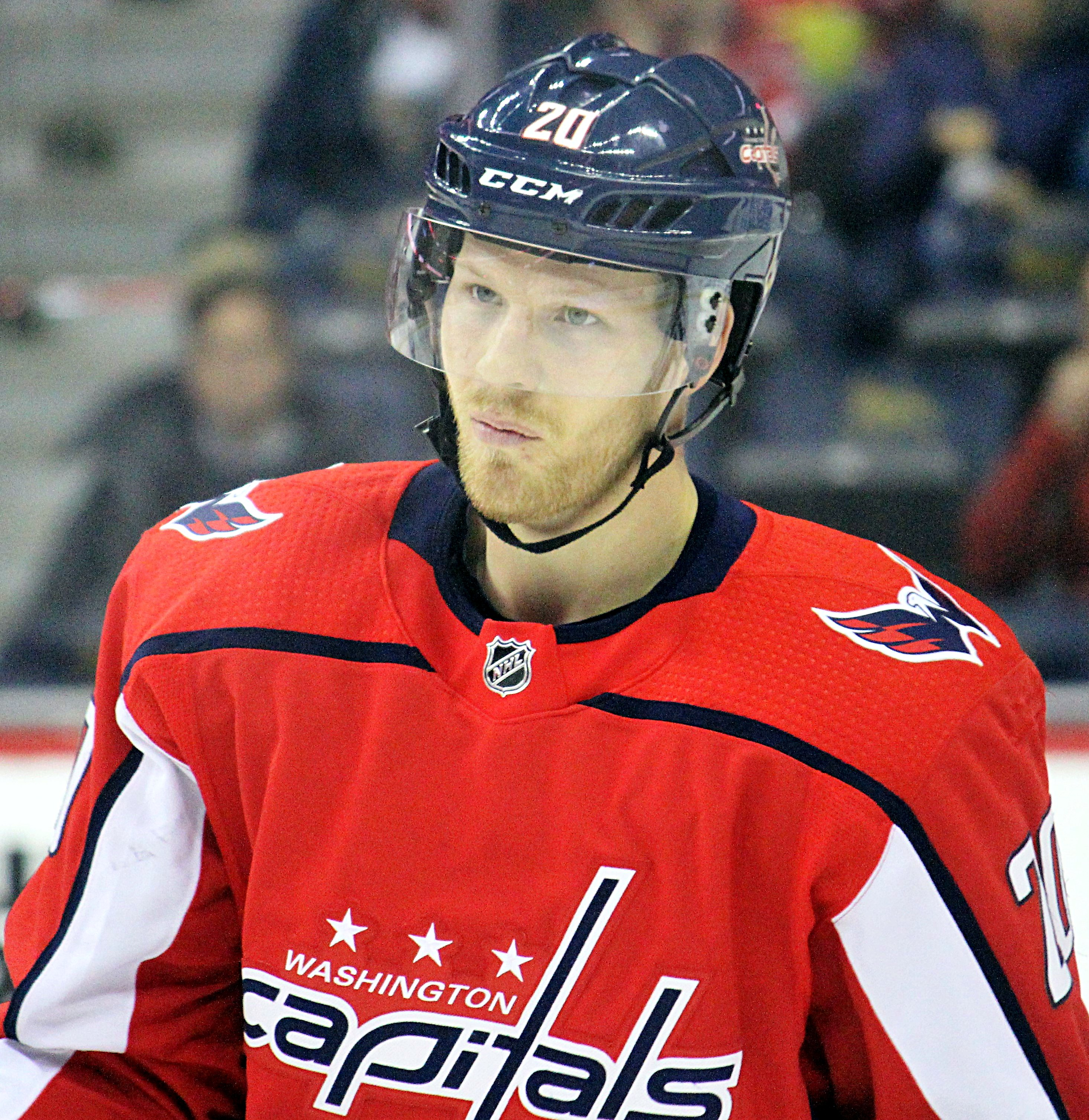
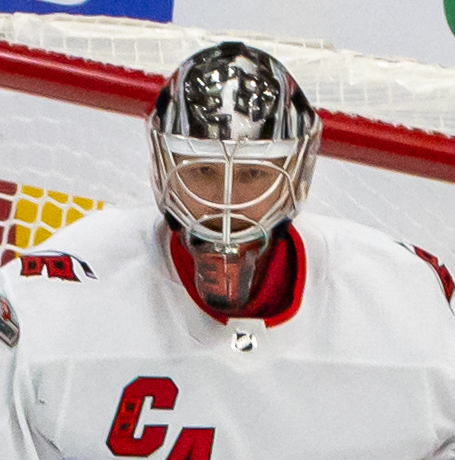
Clockwise from top left: Frans Nielsen, Nikolaj Ehlers, Frederik Andersen, and Lars Eller are among the most notable Danes to play in the NHL.

Frans Nielsen, who played 15 National Hockey League (NHL) seasons with the New York Islanders and Detroit Red Wings, was the first Danish-born and trained player to play in the NHL. Current Carolina Hurricanes forward Nikolaj Ehlers holds the NHL record for most points of any Danish-born player, while defenseman Jannik Hansen was the first Danish-born and trained player to appear in a playoff game, making his playoff debut for the Vancouver Canucks in 2007. Current Florida Panthers forward Lars Eller was the first Dane to win the Stanley Cup, doing so with the Washington Capitals in 2018, and later became the first Dane to play 1,000 NHL games in 2024. Frederik Andersen became the first Danish goaltender to appear in an NHL game when he debuted for the Anaheim Ducks in 2013, later reaching the milestones of 500 games played and 300 wins while with the Hurricanes in 2025. With the Hurricanes' Stanley Cup victory in 2026, Andersen and Ehlers joined Eller as the second and third Danish players to win the Cup.
