= Thai World Hockey League =

- Sport: Ice hockey
- Founded: 2003
- No. of teams: 4
- Country: Thailand
- Most recent champion: BNH Hospital Blades
- Website: jogsports.com

The Thai World Hockey League was an ice hockey league in Thailand. After 14 years, it was replaced by the Siam Hockey League for the months of November through May. The TWHL was one of the first leagues that allowed various skill levels to participate. The Siam Hockey League was formed to try to establish a high level of play.

== History ==
The Thai World Hockey League was founded by the American Scott Whitcomb and the Canadian Scott Murray in the year 2003, who both were players of the Flying Farangs, a Thailand-based team of foreign ice hockey players who compete in club tournaments around Asia.

For the 2015 season, the organizers decided to take a year off, which became permanent, leading to the formation of the Siam Hockey League, organized by former TWHL players and staff. There is also a "summer" league run by locals called the Bangkok Ice Hockey League.

The Thai World Hockey League consisted of roughly 50 per cent foreigners and 50 per cent domestic players.

Tournaments organized by the league are the Land of Smiles Classic and the City of Angels Cup. Up to 42 teams from 15 countries worldwide participate in these tournaments every year.

== Teams (2011-12) ==
- BNH Hospital Blades
- Din Daeng Jets
- Pattaya Oilers
- Penalty Spot Slammers

== TWHL champions ==
- 2015: Sport Corner Snipers
- 2012: Din Daeng Jets
- 2011: BNH Hospital Blades
- 2010/11: Pattaya Oilers
- 2009/10: Roadhouse Smokers
- 2008/09: Wall Street Warriors
- 2007/08: Curve Intrior Specialist Coyotes
- 2006/07: Curve Contracting Coyotes
- 2005/06: Jamcomb Sports Leafs
- 2004/05: Curve Contracting Coyotes
- Spring 2004: Office Bar Bruins
- Autumn 2003: Klong Toey Whalers
