= Singapore National Ice Hockey League =

Singapore National Hockey Ice League
- Sport: Ice hockey
- Founded: 1995
- Country: Singapore
- Most recent champions: Singapore Scotiabank, JOG, Momentum (2017)
- Most titles: Singapore Recreation Club (3)
- Website: http://www.siha.org.sg

The Singapore National Ice Hockey League (NIHL) is the ice hockey league in Singapore. It was first contested in 1995.

The NIHL has grown to encompass three divisions, catering to players of varying skill levels:

- Division 1: Elite level, featuring top players with extensive experience, averaging over 15 years.
- Division 2: Advanced level, comprising a mix of recreational players and emerging talents, with an average experience of over 10 years.
- Division 3: Novice level, for players relatively new to organized hockey, averaging over 5 years of experience.

The league operates on a seasonal basis, with two main seasons:

- Winter League: The primary season, running from September to April.
- Summer League: An abbreviated season from June to August.

== Champions ==
- 2017: D1: Singapore Scotiabank, D2: JOG, D3: Momentum
- 2016: Scotia
- 2015: SEB
- 2014: Triple-O Singapore
- 2013: Singapore Scotiabank
- 2010-2012: none
- 2009: White Team
- 2008: Harrys
- 2007: San Miguel
- 2006: M1 Hornets
- 2005: Linear Technology Lions
- 2004: Brewerkz Bruins
- 2003: M1 Hornets
- 2002: Continental Wings
- 2001: Linear Technology Lions
- 2000: Singapore Khalsa Association
- 1999: Chenab
- 1998: Singapore Recreation Club
- 1997: Singapore Recreation Club
- 1996: Singapore Indian Association
- 1995: Singapore Recreation Club
