= Solar Ice Rink =

Ice rink in Nairobi, Kenya

Coordinates: 1.329034°S 36.855821°E

The Solar Ice Rink is an ice rink located in Nairobi, Kenya. The rink is located in the Panari Sky Centre, a large retail, leisure and hotel accommodation complex.

Opened in 2005, the Solar Ice Rink is the largest rink in Africa, and the first rink in East Africa and Central Africa. The rink cost US$700,000 to build.

The rink covers an area of 1,400 square metres (15,000 sq ft), and can accommodate 200 skaters.

It is the home of the Kenya Ice Lions hockey team.
