= 2012 South African Ice Hockey Club Championship =

2012 SAIHA Senior Club Championship
Tournament details
- Host country: South Africa
- Venue: 1 (in 1 host city)
- Dates: Sep 24 – Sep 30
- Teams: 5

Final positions
- Champions: Penguins
- Runners-up: Warriors
- Third place: Wildcats
- Fourth place: Scorpions

Tournament statistics
- Games played: 10
- Goals scored: 100 (10 per game)

Awards
- MVP: Marc Giot (Penguins)

The 2012 SAIHA Senior Club Championship was played between September 24 and September 30, 2012 in the South African city of Kempton Park (Gauteng). The venues are the Festival Mall Ice Arena.

== Participating teams ==
Club	City	Province	Arena	Rosters
Scorpions	Kempton Park	Gauteng	Festival Mall Ice Arena	(roster)
Vipers	Kempton Park	Gauteng	Festival Mall Ice Arena	(roster)
Warriors	Pretoria	Gauteng	Kollonade Ice Rink	(roster)
Wildcats	Kempton Park	Gauteng	Festival Mall Ice Arena	(roster)
Penguins	Cape Town	Western Cape	The Ice Station Arena	(roster)

== Rules ==
For standing purposes, points shall be awarded as follows:

- 2 points for a win in regulation time
- 1 points for a draw in regulation time
- No points for a loss in regulation time

The games will be played as follows:

- First 2 periods running time and the 3rd period stop time.
- The clock will stop when there is a penalty or a goal.
- The last two minutes of the 1sdt and 2nd period will be stop time.

== Standings ==
Pos	Team	Pld	W	D	L	GF	GA	GD	Pts
1	Penguins (C)	4	3	1	0	28	10	+18	6
2	Warriors	4	3	1	0	26	8	+18	6
3	Wildcats	4	2	0	2	19	13	+6	4
4	Scorpions	4	1	0	3	19	26	−7	2
5	Vipers	4	0	0	4	8	43	−35	0

(C) Champions
- Penguins won gold medal.
- Penguins and Warriors were both equal on Points and Goal Difference
- Therefore, the tie breaker was determined on Goals Scored.

== Fixtures and results ==
All times are local (UTC+02).

Sep 24, 2012; 19:30	Vipers	4–11 (1–2, 2–4, 1–5)	Scorpions	Festival Mall Ice Arena, Kempton Park

Game reference

R. Steven 60:00
Goalies
52:39 F. Farrell
7:21 J van Vuuren
Referees:
Shane Marsh (South Africa)
Frank Raude (South Africa)

T. Thornton (D, Fisher, N. Graf) (PP) 16:09	1 – 0
	1 – 1	16:38 C. Labuschagne (D. Cardosa, C. Foy)
	1 – 2	19:39 G. Van Eeckhoven (M. Santos, D. Cardosa)
	1 – 3	20:07 D. Cardosa (G. Van Eeckhoven)
	1 – 4	21:11 D. Cardosa (C. Labuschagne, F. Habib)
	1 – 5	28:30 S. Laine (M. Santos, D. Cardosa)
N. Graf (T. Thornton) 37:16	2 – 5
	2 – 6	38:20 (PP) D. Cardosa
M. Edwards (N. Graf) 39:16	3 – 6
	3 - 7	41:14 S. Laine (R. Kowalenko)
	3 - 8	42:49 R. Kowalenko (S. Laine, G. Habib)
	3 - 9	45:54 D. Cardosa (C. Labuschagne, F. Habib)
	3 - 10	46:07 D. Cardosa (C. Labuschagne, F. Habib)
	3 - 11	49:56 D. Cardosa (G. Van Eeckhoven)
N. Graf (T. Thornton) 51:30	4 - 11

6 min
Penalties
8 min
14
Shots
61

Sep 25, 2012; 20:30	Wildcats	8–0 (3–0, 4–0, 1–0)	Vipers	Festival Mall Ice Arena, Kempton Park

Game reference

G. Bock 60:00
Goalies
60:00 R. Steven
Referee:
Nicky Beukes (South Africa)

A. Pretorious (C. Engelbrecht, J. Valadas) 05:33	1 – 0
J. Valadas (G. Lyon, C. Engelbrecht) 11:43	2 – 0
J. Valadas (I. Ashworth, G. Bock) (SH) 18:43	3 – 0
I. Ashworth (J. Valadas, A. Pretorious) 28:08	4 –0
J. Valadas (A. Pretorious) (PP) 28:43	5 – 0
D. Venter (G. Lyon, I. Ashworth) 32:32	6 – 0
I. Ashworth (C. Engelbrecht, J. Valadas) 39:25	7 – 0
J. Valadas 42:00 (D. Compton)	8 – 0

12 min
Penalties
6 min
63
Shots
19

Sep 27, 2012; 17:40	Warriors	8–2 (1–2, 1–0, 6–0)	Vipers	Festival Mall Ice Arena, Kempton Park

Game reference

A. Bock 48:07
D. Sheppard 11:53
Goalies
60:00 R. Steven
Referees:
Frank Raude (South Africa)
Barry Thandy (South Africa)

	0 - 1	08:58 N. Graf (M. Edwards)
	0 - 2	18:14 M. Edwards (N. Graf)
R. Willemstijn (S. Du Preez, A. Marais) 18:50	1 - 2
J. Gonsalves (A. Marais) (PP) 31:40	2 - 2
X. Botha (A. Marais) 43:53	3 - 2
A. Marais (J. Grobler, J. Booysen) 47:03	4 - 2
A. Marais (G. Kotze, C. Birrell) 52:35	5 - 2
J. Booysen (W. Du Preez, X. Botha) 54:54	6 - 2
W. Du Preez (A. Marais, J. Booysen) 55:32	7 - 2
A. Marais (W. Du Preez, X. Botha) 58:50	8 - 2

2 min
Penalties
4 min
39
Shots
13

Sep 28, 2012; 08:00	Scorpions	1–10 (1–3, 0–3, 0–4)	Warriors	Festival Mall Ice Arena, Kempton Park

Game reference

Foy Farrell 52:15
J van Vuuren 7:45
Goalies
60:00 Ashley Bock
Referees:
Frank Raude (South Africa)
Eddie Compton (South Africa)

R. Kowalenko (J. Brand) 07:13	1 - 0
	1 - 1	08:36 (PP) A. Marais (C. Birrell)
	1 - 2	16:56 (PP) C. Birrell (A. Marais)
	1 - 3	18:51 (PP) J. Gonsalves (A. Marais, A. Donskikh)
	1 - 4	20:45 J. Gonsalves (C. Birrell)
	1 - 5	23:18 C. Birrell
	1 - 6	25:54 C. Birrell (A. Marais)
	1 - 7	41:50 R. Willemstijn (J. Booysen, J. Grobler)
	1 - 8	51:11 (PP) J. Booysen (C. Birrell)
	1 - 9	52:51 A. Donskikh (J. Grobler)
	1 - 10	58:52 A. Donskikh (J. Booysen)

44 min
Penalties
8 min
9
Shots
39

Sep 28, 2012; 17:30	Penguins	4–2 (0–1, 1–1, 3–0)	Wildcats	Festival Mall Ice Arena, Kempton Park

Game reference

Jack Nebe 60:00
Goalies
60:00 Gary Bock
Referees:
Frank Raude (South Africa)
Jonathan Burger (South Africa)

	0 - 1	19:02 J. Valadas (I. Ashworth, K. Thornton)
M. Giot (SH) 29:29	1 - 1
	1 - 2	32:36 (PP) J. Valadas (I. Ashworth, K. Thornton)
C. Nebe (D. Magmoed, E. Samuels) 44:21	2 - 2
C. Nebe 56:15	3 - 2
M. Giot 59:50	4 - 2

10 min
Penalties
2 min
21
Shots
36

Sep 29, 2012; 06:15	Vipers	2–16 (1–5, 1–5, 0–6)	Penguins	Festival Mall Ice Arena, Kempton Park

Game reference

Steven Ryan 48:51
Dean Sheppard 11:09
Goalies
60:00 Jack Nebe
Referees:
Nicky Beukes (South Africa)
Barry Thandy (South Africa)

	0 - 1	02:00 I. Tshekashkine (J. Joubert)
	0 - 2	03:28 L. Carelse (M. Giot, W. Krotz)
	0 - 3	06:21 M. Giot (D. Magmoed)
S. Burdon (P. Kruger) 11:05	1 - 3
	1 - 4	11:11 D. Magmoed (C. Nebe, J. Joubert)
	1 - 5	19:33 C. Reeves (L. Stringer)
	1 - 6	20:24 M. Goit (L. Carlese, W. Krotz)
S. Morrison 24:23	2 - 6
	2 - 7	27:33 (SH) M. Goit (L. Carelse)
	2 - 8	30:12 J. Mcambo (E. Samuels)
	2 - 9	36:35 W. Krotz (L. Carelse)
	2 - 10	37:57 J. Joubert (I. Tshekashkine, C. Reeves)
	2 - 11	46:01 C. Nebe (J. Joubert, D. Magmoed)
	2 - 12	47:50 D. Magmoed (C. Swartland)
	2 - 13	48:51 L. Carelse (M. Goit)
	2 - 14	53:34 J. Joubert (D. Magmoed)
	2 - 15	54:25 D. Magmoed
	2 - 16	57:17 L. Carelse (M. Goit)

2 min
Penalties
14 min
9
Shots
59

Sep 29, 2012; 08:00	Warriors	4–1 (3–0, 0–1, 1–0)	Wildcats	Festival Mall Ice Arena, Kempton Park

Game reference
Referees: Frank Raude (South Africa); Jonathan Burger (South Africa)

Sep 29, 2012; 17:30	Scorpions	2–4 (0–1, 1–2, 1–1)	Penguins	Festival Mall Ice Arena, Kempton Park

Game reference
Referees: Jonathan Burger (South Africa); Frank Raude (South Africa)

Sep 30, 2012; 08:00	Penguins	4–4 (2–1, 0–1, 2–2)	Warriors	Festival Mall Ice Arena, Kempton Park

Game reference
Referees: Jonathan Burger (South Africa); Frank Raude (South Africa)

Sep 30, 2012; 17:30	Wildcats	8–5 (1–2, 3–0, 4–3)	Scorpions	Festival Mall Ice Arena, Kempton Park

Game reference
Referee: Frank Raude (South Africa)

== Final standings ==
The final standings of the tournament according to SAIHA:

Gold medal	Penguins
Silver medal	Warriors
Bronze medal	Wildcats
4	Scorpions
5	Vipers

== Officials ==
The SAIHA selected 5 referees to work the 2012 SAIHA Senior Club Championship. They were the following:

Referees

- (South Africa) Nicky Buekes
- (South Africa) Shane Marsh
- (South Africa) Frank Raude
- (South Africa) Barry Thandy
- (South Africa) Jonathan Burger

== Statistics ==
=== Scoring leaders ===
List shows the top 10 skaters sorted by points, then goals. If the list exceeds 10 skaters because of a tie in points, all of the tied skaters are left out.

Player	Club	GP	G	A	Pts	+/-	PIM	POS
Andre Marais	Warriors	1	4	7	11	+8	0	DF
Damian Cardosa	Scorpions	2	6	3	9	+5	24	FW
Jack Valadas	Wildcats	1	4	3	7	+6	0	FW
Cameron Birrell	Warriors	2	3	4	7	+3	2	FW
Nicolas Graf	Vipers	3	3	3	6	-4	6	DF
Jacques Booysen	Warriors	2	2	4	6	+7	2	DF
Ian Ashworth	Wildcats	1	2	2	4	+6	0	DF
Cyle Labuschagne	Scorpions	2	1	3	4	-1	2	FW

GP = Games played; G = Goals; A = Assists; Pts = Points; +/- = Plus/minus; PIM = Penalties in minutes; POS = Position

=== Leading goaltenders ===
Player	Club	GP	TOI	W	D	L	SO	GA	GAA	SV	Sv%
Gary Bock	Wildcats	1	60:00	1	0	0	1	0	.00	19	100.00
Ashley Bock	Warriors	2	108:07	2	0	0	0	2	1.11	19	90.5
Farrell Foy	Scorpions	2	104:54	1	0	1	0	12	6.86	39	76.5
Steven Ryan	Vipers	3	180:00	0	0	3	0	27	9.00	136	83.4
Jack Nebe	Penguins	0	00:00	0	0	0	0	0	0.00	0	0.0

TOI = Time on ice (minutes:seconds); SA = Shots against; GA = Goals against; GAA = Goals against average; Sv% = Save percentage; SO = Shutouts

== Penguins ==
- Coach: Ronni Wood
- Manager: Toni Stringer

=== Skaters ===
Number	Position	Player	GP	G	A	Pts	PIM	+/−
7	D	Dean Magmoed	3	3	6	9	16	+14
9	F	Marc Giot	4	8	3	11	8	+11
10	F	Luke Carelse	4	5	5	10	2	+13
12	D	Luke Stringer	4	0	2	2	2	+4
13	F	Wesley Krotz	4	2	4	6	0	+8
18	F	Tariq Ishmail	1	0	0	0	0	0
21	D	Chrisopher Reeves	4	1	2	3	6	+11
22	F	Cai Nebe	4	3	2	5	0	+6
8	D	Ethan Samuels	4	1	2	3	22	+3
11	D	Curtley Swartland	4	0	1	1	2	+13
6	F	Jerry Mcambo	4	1	0	1	0	+2
17	F	Ivan Tchekashkine	4	2	1	3	0	+6

=== Goaltenders ===
Number	Player	GP	W	T	L	Min	GA	GAA	SV	SV%	SO
1	Jack Nebe	4	4	1	0	240:00	10	2.50	100	90.9	0

== Scorpions ==
- Coach: Nicky Beukes
- Manager: Peter Habib, John Watson

=== Skaters ===
Number	Position	Player	GP	G	A	Pts	PIM	+/−
10	F	Damian Cardosa	4	12	4	16	26	+4
16	F	Grant Van Eeckhoven	4	1	4	5	2	-1
2	F	S. Laine	4	3	1	4	6	+1
13	Y	Robert Kowalenko	4	2	2	4	4	-1
55	F	Cyle Labuschagne	4	1	3	4	2	-3
52	D	Franco Habib	4	0	4	4	20	+2
19	F	Mike Santos	4	0	3	3	0	+2
88	F	Clinton Foy	4	0	3	3	6	-3
47	D	Barry Tandy	3	0	1	1	0	-6
24	D	Gerrad Habib	2	0	1	1	0	+3
3		JJ Brand	1	0	1	1	0	-2
12	F	Russel Van Heyningen	4	0	0	0	0	+3
28		K Austin	4	0	0	0	0	-2
		Andrew Rundle	4	0	0	0	0	-1
3	D	Nicky Beukes	2	0	0	0	2	-1
87	F	Jarrad Joyce	2	0	0	0	0	0

=== Goaltenders ===
Number	Player	GP	W	T	L	Min	GA	GAA	SV	SV%	SO
1	Farrell Foy	4	1	0	3	224:54	24	6.40	95	79.8	0
1	Charl Janse van Vuuren	2	1	0	1	15:06	2	7.95			0

== Vipers ==
- Coach: Nicholas Graff
- Manager: Sharon Fisher

=== Skaters ===
Number	Position	Player	GP	G	A	Pts	PIM	+/−
11	D	Nicholas Graff	3	3	3	6	6	-4
21	D	Michael Edwards	4	2	1	3	6	-5
26	F	Taylor Thornton	4	1	2	3	0	-16
4	D	Shay Morrison	4	1	0	1	0	-15
		Sheldon Burdon	4	1	0	1	0	-13
9	F	Daniel Fisher	4	0	1	1	0	-16
20		P. Kruger	1	0	1	1	0	-5
27	F	Dean Van Aswegen	4	0	0	0	0	-14
29	F	Werner Redelinghuys	4	0	0	0	2	-15
33	D	David Lok	4	0	0	0	2	-15
14	F	Zayne Du Plessis	2	0	0	0	0	-4
19	D	Brendan Schultz	2	0	0	0	0	-7
		Lee Irving	2	0	0	0	2	-6
10	F	Kalvin Carr	1	0	0	0	0	0
20	F	Carel Esterhuizen	1	0	0	0	0	-3
23		Arne Kotze	1	0	0	0	0	-3
24		C. Shuler	1	0	0	0	0	-6
43		D. Malcolm	1	0	0	0	0	-6
47	D	Albertus Bodenstein	1	0	0	0	0	-6
			4	8	8	16	18	-159

=== Goaltenders ===
Number	Player	GP	W	T	L	Min	GA	GAA	SV	SV%	SO
30	Steven Ryan	4	0	0	4	228:51	40	10.49	179	81.7	0
36	Dean Sheppard	1	0	0	1	11:09	3	16.14			0

== Warriors ==
- Coach: Andre Marais
- Manager: Hannes Botha

=== Skaters ===
Number	Position	Player	GP	G	A	Pts	PIM	+/−
12	D	Andre Marais	4	8	9	17	4	+11
18	F	Cameron Birrell	4	3	6	9	2	+3
4	D	Jacques Booysen	4	2	6	8	4	+7
17	F	Warick Du Preez	3	3	4	7	2	+7
21	F	Jason Gonsalves	4	3	1	4	6	+9
8	F	Xander Botha	4	1	3	4	0	+8
13	F	Jaco Grobler	4	1	3	4	0	+4
10	F	Riaan Willemstijn	4	3	0	3	2	-1
2	F	Andrey Donski	4	2	1	3	0	+5
6	F	Spencer Du Preez	4	0	1	1	0	0
15	D	Gardus Kotze	4	0	1	1	0	+1
7	F	Philip Kotze	4	0	0	0	0	-2
11		Denzil Verwey	4	0	0	0	0	0
14	D	Andre Visser	4	0	0	0	0	-1
1	G	Ashley Bock	4	0	1	1	2	0
			4	26	36	62	24	+51

=== Goaltenders ===
Number	Player	GP	W	T	L	Min	GA	GAA	SV	SV%	SO
1	Ashley Bock	4	3	1	0	228:07	7	1.84	54	88.5	0
00	Dean Sheppard	1	0	0	0	11:53	1	5.05	0	0	0

== Wildcats ==
- Coach: Shane Marsh
- Manager: Shane Marsh

=== Skaters ===
Number	Position	Player	GP	G	A	Pts	PIM	+/−
4	F	Jack Valadas	4	10	2	13	0	+3
11	D	Ian Ashworth	4	2	4	6	0	+6
22	F	Rudi Pienaar	4	2	3	5	6	-2
21	F	Chris Engelbrecht	4	0	4	4	2	+5
40	F	Anton Pretorious	4	1	2	3	2	+4
19	F	George Lyon	4	0	3	3	0	0
66	F	Dylan Venter	4	2	0	2	0	-3
77	D	Burton Matthews	4	2	0	2	0	+1
10	F	Keegan Thornton	4	0	2	2	2	+7
9	D	Calium Bremner	4	0	1	1	0	-4
68	F	Dylan Compton	4	0	1	1	2	-3
8	D	Ryan Marsh	4	0	0	0	0	-3
20	G	Gary Bock	4	0	1	1	0	0
			4	19	24	43	20	+11

=== Goaltenders ===
Number	Player	GP	W	T	L	Min	GA	GAA	SV	SV%	SO
20	Gary Bock	4	1	2	0	240:00	13	3.25	68	84	1
