= Croatian Ice Hockey Federation =

Ice hockey governing body of Croatia

Croatia
- Association name: Croatian Ice Hockey Federation
- IIHF Code: CRO
- IIHF membership: May 7, 1992
- President: Vjekoslav Jadrešić

The Croatian Ice Hockey Federation (Croatian: Hrvatski savez hokeja na ledu, HSHL) is the governing body of ice hockey in Croatia.

The Croatian Ice Hockey Federation was established on November 9, 1935 in Zagreb. It has been a member of IIHF since May 7, 1992. It is based in Zagreb, Trg Krešimira Ćosića 11.

== National teams ==
- Croatia men's national ice hockey team
- Croatia men's national junior ice hockey team
- Croatia men's national under-18 ice hockey team
- Croatia women's national ice hockey team
