= Kuwait Hockey League =

Kuwait national ice hockey league

The Kuwait Hockey League is the national ice hockey league in Kuwait and the 68th member of the International Ice Hockey Federation. Four teams participated in the 2008-2009 season, and the top two teams met in the final, won by Kuwait (Kuwait City).

== 2008-09 season ==
=== Regular season ===
| | Club | GP | W | T | L | Pts |
|---|---|---|---|---|---|---|
| 1. | Qadsia | 4 | 4 | 0 | 0 | 8 |
| 2. | Kuwait | 4 | 3 | 0 | 1 | 6 |
| 3. | Kazma | 4 | 1 | 0 | 3 | 2 |
| 4. | Salmiya | 4 | 0 | 0 | 4 | 0 |

=== Final ===
- Kuwait 4 - Qadsia 2
