= Ice hockey in Indonesia =

- Country: Indonesia
- Governing body: Federasi Hoki Es Indonesia
- National team(s): Men's national team
- First played: 1996

National competitions
- Indonesia Ice Hockey League

International competitions
- Asian Winter Games; Southeast Asian Games

Ice hockey in Indonesia is a minor but growing sport. Ice hockey was first played in Indonesia in 1996 when the country's second indoor rink, the Sky Rink, opened at the Mall Taman Anggrek in Jakarta. The country's first ice rink, the Plaza Senayan, had been built in the 1980s. Two more rinks have recently opened, the Gardenice Rink (800 square meters) in Bandung and the BX Rink (24-by-55-meters) at the Bintaro Jaya Xchange Mall in Tangsel. The Indonesia Ice Hockey Federation known in Indonesian as the Federasi Hoki Es Indonesia (FHEI) was founded in 2012 and it joined the International Ice Hockey Federation (IIHF) as an associate member on May 20, 2016.
