= Ice hockey in Belgium =

- Country: Belgium
- Governing body: Royal Belgian Ice Hockey Federation
- National team(s): Men's national team; Women's national team

National competitions
- Belgian National League

Ice hockey in Belgium is governed by the Royal Belgian Ice Hockey Federation. The Belgian Hockey League, the top level of Belgian hockey, was founded in 1911. The Belgian National League is the second level league. Belgian men's, women's, and junior national teams participate at the World Championships. Belgium was a founding member of the IIHF.
