= Hong Kong Ice Hockey League =

Sports league in Hong Kong, China

- Sport: Ice hockey
- No. of teams: 8
- Country: Hong Kong
- Most recent champion: Hexagon
- Most titles: Dharmala Jets; Golden Castle; Penguins (2)

The Hong Kong Ice Hockey League is the national ice hockey league in Hong Kong.

== Champions ==
- 2017: Hexagon
- 2016: HKIHA
- 2015: Penguins
- 2014: Golden Castle
- 2013: Golden Castle
- 2012: Coors Light
- 2011: Penguins
- 2010: HKGFM
- 2009: Returning Hope
- 2007: Sam Wai
- 2005: Hong Kong 3
- 2001: Distacom Devils
- 2000: Nike Jets
- 1999: Bud Gold
- 1998: Dharmala Jets
- 1997: Dharmala Jets
