= Esiliiga (ice hockey) =

Estonian ice hockey league season for second division

- Sport: Ice hockey
- Founded: 2006
- Folded: 2009
- No. of teams: 3-5
- Country: Estonia

The Esiliiga was the second level of ice hockey in Estonia from 2006–2009. HC Sokol Tallinn won the league in 2006–07.
