= 2008 IIHF World Championship final =

Ice hockey match

	1	2	3	OT	Total
Russia	1	1	2	1	5
Canada	3	1	0	0	4
- Date: May 18, 2008
- Arena: Colisée Pepsi
- City: Quebec City
- Attendance: 13,339

The 2008 IIHF World Championship final was an ice hockey match that took place on 18 May 2008 at the Colisée Pepsi in Quebec City, Canada, to determine the winner of the 2008 IIHF World Championship. Russia defeated Canada 5–4 in overtime to win its 2nd championship.

== Background ==
The game marked the first time that Russia and Canada met in the final of a World Championship. It was Russia's third finals appearance, and the first since 2002. It was Canada's fifth appearance in the finals in six years, and having won the 2007 World Championship in Russia, they were the defending champions.

== Venue ==
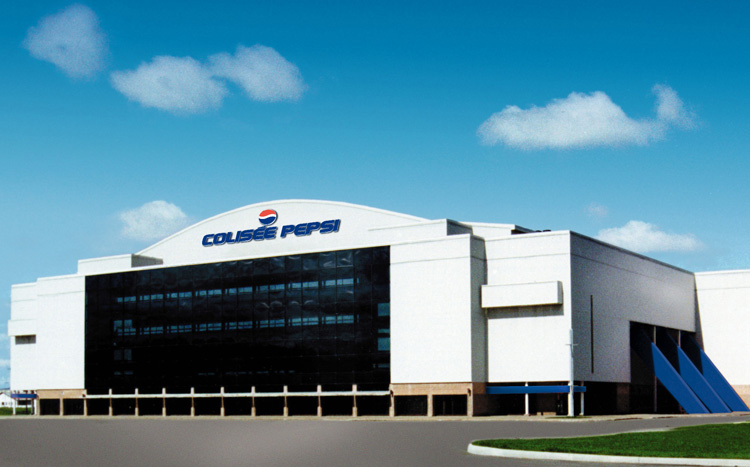
Colisée Pepsi, Quebec City

The Colisée Pepsi in Quebec City was chosen to host the final of the championship. Previously at the tournament, the venue hosted both the semi-finals, and the Bronze medal match. In the final, the attendance was 13,339.

== Match ==
=== Summary ===
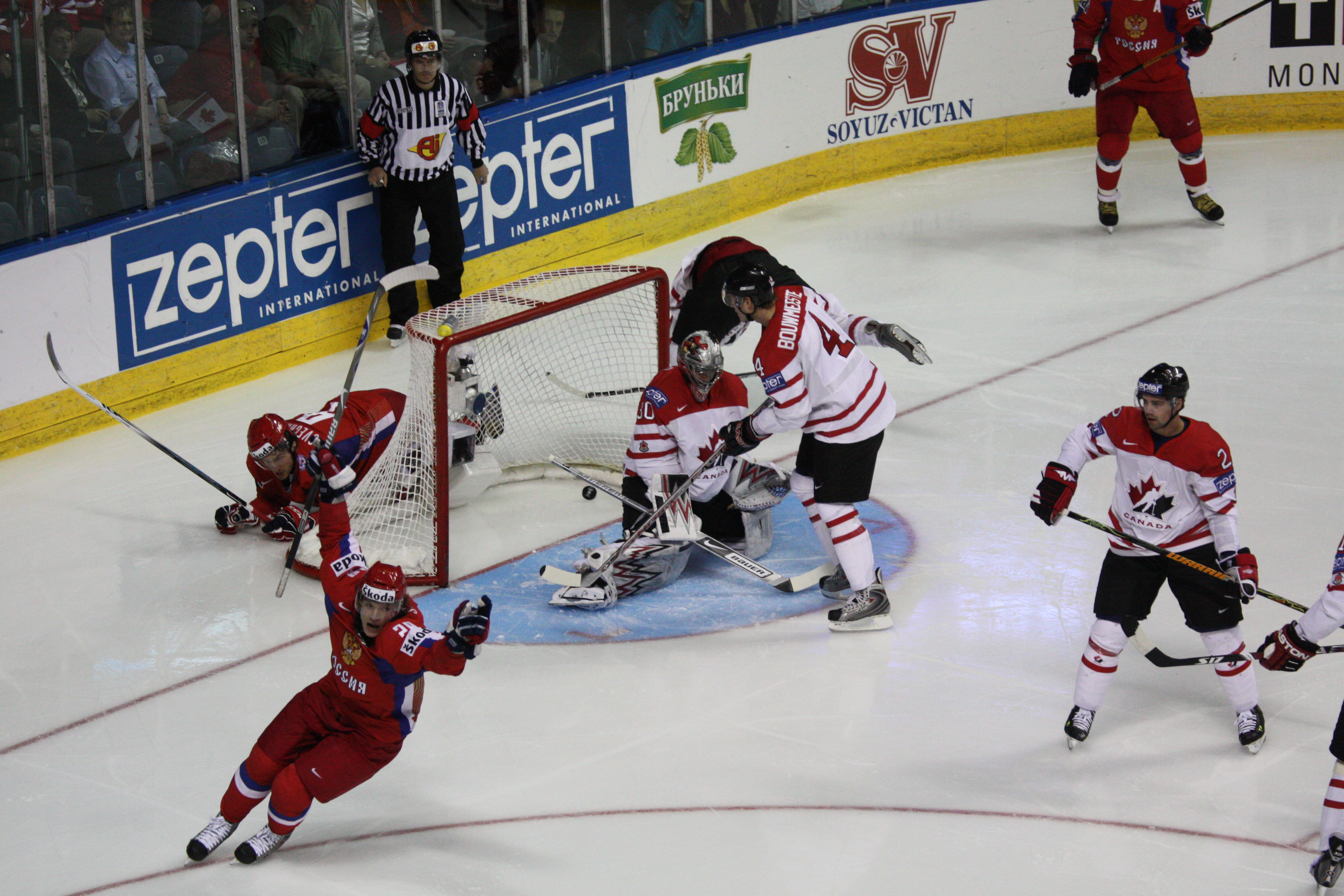
Alexander Semin after scoring the first goal of the finals

Alexander Semin scored right in front of the net on a pass from Alexander Ovechkin at 1:23 into the first period, after a defensive pass by the Canadians hit a referee's skate and redirected to Ovechkin. Moments later Brent Burns took a shot from the point, which beat Evgeni Nabokov on the stick side, to tie up the game for team Canada. Chris Kunitz then capitalized on a defensive zone turnover by the Russians, and scored top shelf to make the score 2–1 for Canada. At 14:51 of the first, on a 5-on-3, Burns scored his second of the game from the top of the crease.

1:14 into the second period, Semin scored his second, on a one-timer to bring the Russians within 1. The Canadians responded soon after when Dany Heatley banked one in short-side to restore the two-goal lead, 4–2.

At 8:55 into the third period Alexei Tereshchenko grabbed a loose puck in the slot, and pushed it in five-hole on Ward. With under 7 minutes left Ilya Kovalchuk took a wrist shot that beat a heavily trafficked Canadian crease to tie the game 4–4 for Russia.

In overtime Rick Nash was sent to the penalty box for delay of game when he shot the puck over the glass. In the resulting Russian powerplay Kovalchuk scored his second to give Russia a winning goal, 5–4 final score. It was the first World Championship for Russia since 1993, ending a 15-year drought.

=== Details ===
May 18, 2008; 13:00	Canada	4 – 5 OT (3–1, 1–1, 0–2) (OT: 0–1)	Russia	Colisée Pepsi, Quebec City, Quebec; Attendance: 13,339

B. Burns 03:54; C. Kunitz 09:17; B. Burns (PP2) 14:51; D. Heatley 29:56 / Goals / 01:23 A. Semin; 21:14 (PP1) A. Semin; 48:55 A. Tereshchenko; 54:46 I. Kovalchuk; 62:42 (PP1) I. Kovalchuk

== See also ==
- 2008 IIHF World Championship
- Canada men's national ice hockey team
- Russia men's national ice hockey team
