= Lithuanian Cup (ice hockey) =

The Lithuanian Cup was the national ice hockey cup competition in Lithuania. It was only held for the 2000 season, and saw SC Energija win by defeating Viltis Elektrenai in the final.

== Champions ==
- 2000 : SC Energija
