= Qatar International Ice Hockey League =

- Sport: Ice hockey
- Founded: 2002
- First season: 2003
- President: Brent McNair
- No. of teams: 7
- Country: Qatar
- Most recent champions: Dune Bashers (A Division), Nomads (B Division) (2025 Fall Season)
- Website: www.qhockey.com

The Qatar International Ice Hockey League (QIIHL) is the ice hockey league in Qatar. It was first contested in 2003.

== History ==
The QIIHL traces its beginnings to 2002, with formal league competition following in 2003. Lance Mierendorf and Richard Labrosse are credited with establishing the organized league, and its championship trophy would eventually bear their names: the Mierendorf-Labrosse Cup. The inaugural league consisted of four teams, with the Ice Cruisers becoming the first champions in 2003.

Usually league games are played at the Ice rink located in the City Centre Mall in Doha. Due to the different play levels, the league is divided into two divisions (A and B). Since 2007, the Desert Cup is also played in the country. It is planned to install a team with only domestic players to form a national ice hockey team.

In 2010, the QIIHL sponsored the 2010 Red Bull Crashed Ice qualification tournament in Qatar. The competition was won by Bill Chase, a SandVipers (QIIHL) player.

Lance Mierendorf and Richard Labrosse founded the QIIHL in 2003. The Mierendorf Labrosse Cup is awarded to the QIIHL Championship team. The league Started with four teams while a main team went on to play in various tournaments including in Dubia and in Singapore, where the Q-Chem Qanucks won the C league championship in Dubia in 2003-2004.

== Current Teams (2026-2027) ==
A Division
Team	Captain	Uniform	Team Logo
Ice Cats	Jim MacInnis		
Dunebashers	Blake Mihalic		
Oil Kings	Warren Franklin		

B Division
Team	Captain	Uniform	Team Logo
Silver Surfers	Abdulla Zouzou		
Desert Heat	Mark Cice		
Shredders	Daniel McCauley		
Nomads	Phil Sorbetti		

== Venues (Past & Present) ==
Since its establishment in 2003, the QIIHL has played at three venues in Doha, Qatar. The league began at the City Center Doha ice rink, where games were held from 2003 until 2006.

Following the opening of Villaggio Mall, the QIIHL moved to the Olympic-sized Gondolania Ice Arena, which has served as its principal home venue from the 2006–07 season to the present.

Gondolania Ice Arena, Villagio Mall, Al Rayyan, Doha, Qatar

In 2025, the league also played at the newly refurbished ice rink inside the Ali Bin Hamad Al Attiyah Arena (ABHA Arena), marking the third venue to host QIIHL games during the league’s history.

Ali bin Hamad Al-Attiyah Arena (ABHA Arena) - Doha, Qatar

The Ice was removed from ABHA Arena in Summer 2026 in preparation for the FIBA Basketball World Cup 2027 which will be hosted by Qatar form August 27 – September 12, 2027.

Gondolania Ice Arena is currently the only Ice Surface in Qatar and the home of the QIIHL.

== Former Teams ==
- Blyth Academy
- European Fitness Club
- CNAQ Breakers
- Ice Cruisers
- Qatar Gas
- Q-Chem
- RasGas
- Sandstorm
- Sun Dogs
- Hammerheads
- Canadians
- Sand Vipers
- Rink Rats

== Champions ==
- 2026 (Spring): Dune Bashers (A Division), Shredders (B Division)
- 2025 (Fall): Dune Bashers (Division A), Nomads (Division B)
- 2025 (Spring): Ice Cats (Division A), Silver Surfers (Division B)
- 2024 (Fall): Dunebashers (Division A), Silver Surfers (Division B)
- 2024 (Spring): Oil Kings (Mixed Division)
- 2023 (Fall): Oil Kings (Mixed Division)
- 2023(Spring): Blyth Academy (Mixed Division)
- 2022 (Fall): Dunebashers (Mixed Division)
- 2022 (Spring): Dunebashers (Mixed Division)
- 2021 (Fall): Oil Kings (Mixed Division)
- 2021 (Spring): Unknown
- 2020 (Fall): Dunebashers (A Division)
- 2020 (Spring): Oil Kings (A Division)
- 2017 (winter): Rink Rats (Division A), CNAQ Breakers (Division B)
- 2016 (fall): Hammerheads (Division A), Canadians (Division B)
- 2016 (winter): Rink Rats (Division A), Canadians (Division B)
- 2015 (fall): Hammerheads (Division A), CNAQ Breakers (Division B)
- 2015 (winter): CNAQ Breakers (Division A), CNAQ Breakers (Division B)
- 2014 (fall): CNAQ Breakers (Division A), Qatar Oryx (Division B)
- 2014 (winter): three divisions held - A, B, C
- 2013 (fall): SandVipers (Division A), Sun Dogs (Division B)
- 2013 (winter): Division A teams: Canadians, Hammerheads, SandVipers, Division B teams: Sun Dogs, CNAQ Breakers, Ice Cruisers, RasGas
- 2012 2nd Half: Canadians (Division A), unknown (Division B)
- 2012 1st Half: SandVipers (Division A), unknown (Division B)
- 2011 2nd Half A: unknown
- 2011 2nd Half B: unknown
- 2011 1st Half A: unknown
- 2011 1st Half B: unknown
- 2010/11: RasGas
- 2009/10: SandVipers
- 2008/09: European Fitness Club
- 2007/08: Hammerheads
- 2006/07: CNAQ Breakers
- 2005/06: Desert Heat
- 2004: Q-Chem
- 2003: Ice Cruisers

== Travel Team ==
The QIIHL's Travel Team is the Qatar Qanucks.

== Past Presidents ==
- 2024-Present: Brent McNair
- 2019-2024: Jeff Agnew
- 2017-2019: Kristian Walgren
- 2016-2017: John McMahon
- 2014-2016: Jeff Agnew
- 2013-2014: Darcy Webster
- 2010-2013: Greg Scott
- 2008-2010: Rob Carter
- 2006-2008: Greg Scott
- 2005-2006: Jeff Robinson
- 2003-2005: Lance Mierendorf/Richard Labrosse
