= Ice hockey championship of the lands of the Bohemian Crown =

The Ice hockey championship of the lands of the Bohemian Crown was the national ice hockey championship in the lands of the Bohemian Crown from 1909-1912.

== Champions ==
- 1909 HC Slavia Praha
- 1911 HC Slavia Praha
- 1912 HC Slavia Praha
