= Ice hockey in Bosnia and Herzegovina =

- Country: Bosnia and Herzegovina
- Governing body: Bosnia and Herzegovina Ice Hockey Federation
- National team(s): Men's national team Women's national team

National competitions
- BiH Hockey League

Ice hockey in Bosnia and Herzegovina is governed by the Bosnia and Herzegovina Ice Hockey Federation.

The BiH Hockey League was first held in the 2002–03 season. It was not resumed again until the 2009–10 season.

The Bosnia and Herzegovina men's national ice hockey team participated in the 2008 IIHF World Championship Division III Qualification tournament. They lost 10–1 to Greece, and 18–1 to Armenia. The result against Armenia was later changed to a 5-0 Forfeit victory, as Armenia had used ineligible players, including Armenian Jur Kustan and Joshua Wilburs. Bosnia has been a member of the IIHF since May 8, 2001.
