= Georgian Ice Hockey League =

- Sport: Ice hockey
- Founded: 2007
- No. of teams: 4
- Country: Georgia
- Most recent champion: Grey Wolves Tbilisi (3rd title)
- Most titles: Bakurianis Mimino(5)
- Website: hockey.ge

The Georgian Ice Hockey League is the national ice hockey league in the country of Georgia. The league was founded in 2007, and has been contested in the 2007–08 season and annually since the 2011–12 season

== Participating teams ==
- Bakurianis Mimino
- Ice Knights Tbilisi
- Fiery Crusaders Tbilisi
- Grey Wolves Tbilisi

== Champions ==
- 2007–08: Grey Wolves Tbilisi
- 2008–09 to 2010–11: Was not played
- 2011–12: Ice Knights Tbilisi
- 2012–13: Ice Knights Tbilisi
- 2013–14: Grey Wolves Tbilisi
- 2014–15: Bakurianis Mimino
- 2015–16: Bakurianis Mimino
- 2016–17: Grey Wolves Tbilisi
- 2017–18: Bakurianis Mimino
- 2018–19: Bakurianis Mimino
- 2022–23: Bakurianis Mimino
