= Manila Ice Hockey League =

Ice hockey league in the Philippines

- Current season, competition or edition: 2017–18 Manila Ice Hockey League season
- Sport: Ice hockey
- Founded: 2008
- Country: Philippines

The Manila Ice Hockey League (MIHL) is a recreational ice hockey league in the Philippines. Teams play in the ice rink at SM Mall of Asia. The league is composed of Filipinos, as well as expatriates from Canada, the USA, Europe, Korea and Japan. The current MIHL Commissioner is Mike Trainor.

== History ==
The MIHL was founded as the Manila Adult Ice Hockey League on November 28, 2008.

== Teams ==
The MIHL (initially called MAIHL, for Manila Adult Ice Hockey League) has always consisted of four clubs, but the names of the teams and the players playing for them have changed considerably. For the 2017/18 season, for the first time, the MIHL expanded to two divisions, with all four clubs providing a team for both divisions: the "Bayani" Division (i.e. AA) and the "Mabuhay" Division (i.e. B). The winners of the MIHL CUP in the AA Bayani Division in 2017/2018 season were the Cricket Lighters. Team roster included: Jarrett (Jay) Laabs, Ryan Charland, Filip "Donnie" Lindgren, Jamie Booth, Gianpietro Iseppi.

== Current teams ==
- Cricket Lighters
- Omni Insurance Brokers
- Manila Griffins
- Manila Sharps

=== Former teams ===
- Rocky Mountain Cafe (RMC)
- Beavers
- Saints
- Predators

Other {Philippine teams, who have not played in the MIHL:

- Christian Voyagers
- Hawks
- Ice Vixens

== Seasons ==
In season X, the MIHL's final season, the winners of the MIHL CUP were the Cricket Lighters. Team roster included: Jarrett (Jay) Laabs, Ryan Charland, Filip "Donnie" Lindgren, Jamie Booth, Gianpietro Iseppi

=== Season I ===
Teams for the inaugural season were Label 5, the Beavers, the Predators, and the Comets. The first-ever game was between Label 5 and the Beavers. Label 5 were to dominate the first season of league play, with an unbeaten regular-season record 7–0–2. The Predators and the Beavers came in second with the record of 3–4–2. The Comets came up last with a record of 2–0–7. Label 5 then continued its streak into the playoffs, winning the newly established Mall of Asia Cup with the help of Korean goaltender Joey Park. The first season's top scorers were Florian Paquelin (Label 5) and Andre Gan (Predators), both with 26 points. Florian Paquelin (Label 5) also had the most assists at 12 while Andre Gan (Predators) scored the most goals at 12. The top scoring defender was Rolf Beutel (Beavers) with 17 points. Top goaltender was Joey Park (Label 5) with an 87.8% save percentage.

=== Season II ===
The Sharks replaced the Comets for the second season. There was also a major re-draft of players on three out of the four teams; the Predators opted to stay as they were. The Beavers dominated this season, with a record of 5–1–2. The Sharks came in second with a record of 3–4–2, followed by the Predators with a record of 3–4–1 and Label 5 in last place with a record of 3–5–1. With a midseason player reshuffle intended to reduce the Beavers’ domination, Joey Park, along with rookie Darrel Ashley on defense, led the last-place Label 5 to their second Mall of Asia Cup. The top scorers for this season were Rolf Beutel (Beavers) and Andre Gan (Predators) both with 26 points each. Andre Gan (Predators) also scored the most goals with 21. Rolf Beutel (Beavers) again was the top scoring defender and had the most assists. Joey Park was again the top goaltender with a save percentage of 87.5%.

=== Season III ===
The third season saw the lengthening of the schedule to 22 games per year (with four playoff games) so that there would only be one season per year. The new format madeboth the semifinals and the finals best-of-two series. The Predators dominated the regular season with a record of 11–4–1. The Sharks came in second with a record of 8–8–1. Label 5 came in third with a record of 7–9–1 and the Beavers came in last with a record of 6–11–1. Label 5 faced the Beavers in the finals. Label 5, led by Florian Paquelin up front and Darrel Ashley back on the defense, won their third straight Mall of Asia Cup. Rolf Beutel (Beavers) again was the top scorer with 42 points and the top goal-scorer with 28 goals. Serge Bisson (Beavers) had the most assists with 21. Joey Park once again was the top goaltender of the league with a save percentage of 87.4%.
