= Kyrgyzstan Championship (ice hockey) =

- Sport: Ice hockey
- Founded: 2007
- No. of teams: 7
- Country: Kyrgyzstan
- Most recent champion: Dordoi Ala-Too Naryn
- Most titles: Dordoi Ala-Too Naryn; Arstan Shumkar Bishkek
- Website: kihf.kg

The Kyrgyzstan Championship is the national ice hockey championship in Kyrgyzstan.

== Champions ==
- 2016–17 Dordoi Ala-Too Naryn
- 2015–16 Arstan Shumkar Bishkek
- 2014–15 Arstan Shumkar Bishkek
- 2013–14 unknown
- 2012–13 Dordoi Ala-Too Naryn
- 2011–12 Arstan Shumkar Bishkek
- 2010–11 Gornyak Ak-Tuz
- 2009–10 Khan-Tengri Bishkek
- 2008–09 Khan-Tengri Bishkek
- 2007–08 Dordoi Ala-Too Naryn
