= OB I/B. bajnokság =

The OB I/B. bajnokság is the second level of ice hockey in Hungary. The league lies below the OB I bajnokság.

== Teams in the 2010–11 season ==
- Debreceni HC
- Dunaújváros II
- MAC Népstadion
- Tisza Volán SC
