= Ice hockey in Greece =

- Country: Greece
- Governing body: Hellenic Ice Sports Federation
- National teams: Men's national team; Women's national team

National competitions
- Greek Ice Hockey Championship

Greece became an IIHF member in 1987 and participated in five IIHF tournaments from 1991 to 1999.

== History ==
Greek hockey teams were found by Ahepa in the USA at the beginning of the 20th century. In Greece itself the sport started in the 1980s with players from abroad. Since 1999 there is no longer an Olympic-size rink due to lack of funds.

The 2007-08 season saw the return of hockey when a small, temporary rink was built in Athens. The following season saw an ice rink built into a disused wrestling arena built for the 2004 Summer Olympics, but the rink was closed due to the 2008 financial crisis. Ice sports are now limited to smaller rinks. There are two rinks in Athens and another in Thessaloniki. Often teams have to play early morning or late at night because the rinks are mostly used for public skating.

The Greek Ice Hockey Championship is the only level of ice hockey in Greece. It is operated under the jurisdiction of the Greek Ice Sport Federation, a member of the IIHF.
