= Ice hockey in Slovenia =

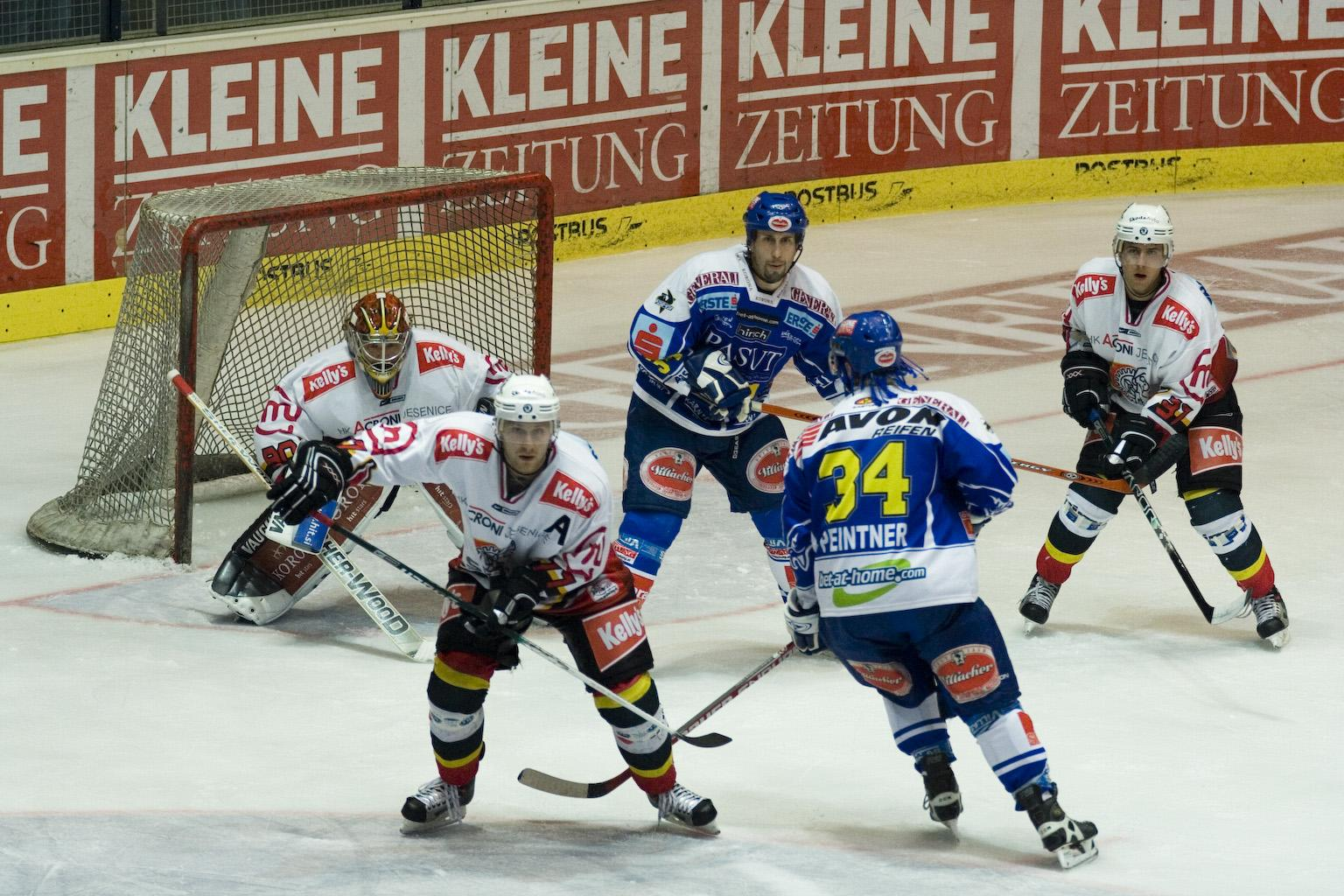
- Country: Slovenia
- Governing body: Ice Hockey Federation of Slovenia
- National teams: Men's national team; Women's national team

National competitions
- Slovenian Ice Hockey League

Ice hockey in Slovenia is a popular sport governed by the Ice Hockey Federation of Slovenia (Hokejska zveza Slovenije). Slovenia is participating in the international ice hockey as an independent nation since 1991, when the country gained independence from SFR Yugoslavia.

== History ==
Ice hockey came to the territories that are today part of Slovenia in the late twenties when it was promoted by Stanko Bloudek. The first ice hockey match was played by Ilirija and Kamnik on 7. February 1932. Ilirija had no competition in Kingdom of Yugoslavia and they had to wait until new clubs were founded in Zagreb and Karlovac. In 1939 Ilirija squad and three players from Zagreb formed Yugoslavia national ice hockey team, which played at the World Ice Hockey Championships in Switzerland. In the same year Yugoslav Ice Hockey League was first played and Ilirija won all the titles until the World War II.

After the war Socialist Yugoslavia was formed and other republics took primacy in Yugoslav ice hockey. SR Slovenia was at first represented in the Yugoslav league only by a team from Ljubljana, later named HK Olimpija, that lost pre-war strength and won its first title only in 1972. The game spread and Ljubljana was soon joined by new teams from Jesenice, Celje, Vevče, and Brežice. Especially HK Jesenice became a force in Yugoslav ice hockey, they won the first league title in 1957 and went on to win 23 titles until 1991. Slovenian players Jesenice and Olimpija had a main role in the Yugoslav national team, which never managed any major results at international competitions. The biggest success of Yugoslavia was winning Group B at the 1968 Winter Olympics. Zvone Šuvak (Jesenice) is the national team's all-time top scorer, while Edo Hafner (Jesenice) earned the most caps.

After the Independence of Slovenia in 1991, local clubs from Yugoslav leagues formed Slovenian Ice Hockey League. In the same year Slovenia national ice hockey team was formed, playing their first official match in Austria in 1992.

== Notable players ==
Anže Kopitar and Jan Muršak are the two slovenians to have played in the NHL.

=== European Leagues ===
Rudi Hiti played for HC Alleghe
