= Jamaican Olympic Ice Hockey Federation =

Jamaican governing body of ice hockey

Jamaica
- Association name: Jamaican Olympic Ice Hockey Federation
- IIHF Code: JAM
- IIHF membership: 18 May 2012
- President: Don Anderson

The Jamaican Olympic Ice Hockey Federation (JOIHF) is the governing body of ice hockey in Jamaica.

== History ==
Old federation logo, used between 2011–2020.

The JOIHF was founded in late 2011, and was accepted into the International Ice Hockey Federation (IIHF) on 18 May 2012. The JOIHF has been a member of the Jamaica Olympic Association (JOA), as well as an associate member of the IIHF, and therefore has no right to vote in the General Assembly. The current president of the JOIHF is Don Anderson.

== Ice hockey statistics ==
- 28 players total
- 2 male players
- 26 junior players
- No referees
- Currently no IIHF standard rinks
- Currently not ranked in the IIHF World Ranking

== National teams ==
- Men's national team
- Men's U20 national team
