= Jamaica men's national junior ice hockey team =

Jamaica
- Association: Jamaican Olympic Ice Hockey Federation
- Head coach: Cyril Bollers
- Team colors
- IIHF code: JAM
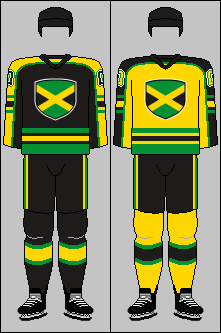

IIHF World Junior Championship
- Appearances: None

International record (W–L–T)
- 0–0–0

The Jamaican men's national under-20 ice hockey team is the national under-20 ice hockey team of Jamaica. They are controlled by the Jamaican Olympic Ice Hockey Federation and has been an associate member of the International Ice Hockey Federation (IIHF) since 18 May 2012. The team have not entered in any World Junior Championship tournaments so far.

== All-time record against other clubs ==
Last match update: 24 June 2018

Key
Positive balance (more Wins)
Neutral balance (Wins = Losses)
Negative balance (more Losses)

Team	GP	W	T	L	GF	GA
(Canada) Midland Flyers	1	1	0	0	5	1
(Canada) Nova Scotia U20	1	1	0	0	5	1
(Canada) Rayside-Balfour Canadians	1	1	0	0	5	4
(United States) East Coast Militia	1	1	0	0	4	0
(Canada) Cochrane Crunch Blue	1	1	0	0	4	1
(Canada) PS101 Team 1	1	1	0	0	4	1
(Canada) Stouffville Spirit	1	1	0	0	4	1
(Canada) Milton Icehawks	1	1	0	0	3	0
(Canada) Newmarket Hurricanes	1	1	0	0	3	0
(Canada) Lindsay Muskies	1	1	0	0	3	1
(Canada) NHD	1	1	0	0	3	1
North American Screaming Eagles	1	1	0	0	3	2
(Canada) NTC Hockey	1	0	0	1	2	4
German Selects	1	0	0	1	1	7
Total	14	12	0	2	49	24
