= 2022 in ice hockey =

The following were the events of ice hockey for the year 2022 throughout the world.

== Winter Olympics and Paralympics ==
The 2022 Winter Olympics and Paralympics took place in Beijing, China.

- February 9 – 20: Ice hockey at the 2022 Winter Olympics – Men's tournament
  - Finland defeats ROC 2–1 to win their first Olympic gold medal.
  - Slovakia defeats Sweden 4–0 to win the bronze medal.
- February 3 – 17: Ice hockey at the 2022 Winter Olympics – Women's tournament
  - Canada defeats United States 3–2 to win their fifth Olympic gold medal.
  - Finland defeats Switzerland 4–0 to win the bronze medal.
- March 5 – 13: Para ice hockey at the 2022 Winter Paralympics
  - United States defeats Canada 5–0 to win their fifth gold medal.
  - China defeats South Korea 4–0 to win the bronze medal.

== IIHF World Championships ==
2022 World Ice Hockey Divisions for the International Ice Hockey Federation (IIHF) took place between December 12, 2021 and September 17, 2022.

Russia and Belarus were indefinitely suspended from international competition by the IIHF on February 28, 2022, due to the Russian invasion of Ukraine.

=== World Junior Ice Hockey Championships ===
- Due to the suspensions of Russia and Belarus, no relegations took place at any level.
- August 9 – 20: 2022 World Junior Ice Hockey Championships in Edmonton, Canada
  - Canada defeated Finland, 3–2 in overtime, to win their 19th World Junior Ice Hockey Championship title.
  - Sweden defeated Czechia, 3–1, to win the bronze medal.
  - The tournament was originally partly played from December 26 to December 29, 2021, but it was cancelled due to COVID-19 outbreaks on multiple teams. The tournament was rescheduled for August, with results and statistics from December nullified. Russia, which was suspended from international competition in between the two iterations of the tournament, was replaced by Latvia for the rescheduled edition.

==== Divisions ====
- The suspensions of Russia and Belarus also resulted in additional promotions.
- December 12, 2021 – December 18, 2021: Division I – Group A in Hørsholm, Denmark
  - Final Round Robin placements: 1. Belarus, 2. Latvia, 3. Norway, 4. Kazakhstan, 5. Denmark, 6. Hungary
  - Belarus and Latvia were promoted to the Top Division for 2023; however, Belarus was removed after their suspension from international competition. In addition to their promotion for 2023, Latvia also took Russia's place in the rescheduled 2022 Top Division tournament.
- December 12, 2021 – December 18, 2021: Division I – Group B in Tallinn, Estonia
  - Final Round Robin placements: 1. France, 2. Slovenia, 3. Japan, 4. Ukraine, 5. Estonia, 6. Poland
  - France and Slovenia were promoted to Division I – Group A for 2023.
- December 13, 2021 – December 19, 2021: Division II – Group A in Brașov, Romania
  - Final Round Robin placements: 1. Italy, 2. South Korea, 3. Great Britain, 4. Spain, 5. Lithuania, 6. Romania
  - Italy and South Korea were promoted to Division I – Group B for 2023.
- July 22 – 30: Division III in Querétaro, Mexico
  - Chinese Taipei defeated Mexico, 5–4 in overtime, to win the tournament.
  - Chinese Taipei and Mexico were promoted to Division II – Group B for 2023.
- September 12 – 17: Division II – Group B in Belgrade, Serbia
  - Final Round Robin placements: 1. Croatia, 2. Netherlands, 3. Serbia, 4. Belgium, 5. Iceland, 6. China (Note: Team withdrew due to the COVID-19 pandemic.)
  - Croatia and the Netherlands were promoted to Division II – Group A for 2023.

=== IIHF World Championship ===
- May 13 – 29: 2022 IIHF World Championship in Tampere and Helsinki, Finland
  - Finland defeated Canada, 4–3 in overtime, to win their fourth World Championship title.
  - Czechia defeated the United States, 8–4, to win the bronze medal.
  - Great Britain and Italy were relegated to Division I – Group A for 2023.

==== Divisions ====
- The suspensions of Russia and Belarus resulted in no relegations below the Top Division; there were also additional promotions.
- March 3 – 8: Division IV in Bishkek, Kyrgyzstan
  - Final Round Robin placements: 1. Kyrgyzstan, 2. Iran, 3. Singapore, 4. Malaysia, 5. Kuwait, 6. Philippines
  - Kyrgyzstan, Iran, Singapore, and Malaysia were promoted to Division III – Group B for 2023.
- March 13 – 18: Division III – Group B in Cape Town, South Africa
  - Final Round Robin placements: 1. South Africa, 2. Thailand, 3. Bosnia and Herzegovina, 4. Hong Kong
  - South Africa and Thailand were promoted to Division III – Group A for 2023.
- April 3 – 8: Division III – Group A in Kockelscheuer, Luxembourg
  - Final Round Robin placements: 1. United Arab Emirates, 2. Turkey, 3. Turkmenistan, 4. Chinese Taipei, 5. Luxembourg, 6. North Korea
  - The United Arab Emirates and Turkey were promoted to Division II – Group B for 2023.
- April 18 – 23: Division II – Group B in Reykjavík, Iceland
  - Final Round Robin placements: 1. Iceland, 2. Georgia, 3. Belgium, 4. Bulgaria, 5. Mexico, 6. New Zealand
  - Iceland and Georgia were promoted to Division II – Group A for 2023.
- April 25 – 30: Division II – Group A in Zagreb, Croatia
  - Final Round Robin placements: 1. China, 2. Netherlands, 3. Croatia 4. Spain, 5. Israel, 6. Australia
  - China and the Netherlands were promoted to Division I – Group B for 2023.
- April 26 – May 1: Division I – Group B in Tychy, Poland
  - Final Round Robin placements: 1. Poland, 2. Japan, 3. Ukraine, 4. Estonia, 5. Serbia
  - Poland was promoted to Division I – Group A for 2023.
- May 3 – 8: Division I – Group A in Ljubljana, Slovenia
  - Final Round Robin placements: 1. Slovenia, 2. Hungary, 3. Lithuania, 4. South Korea, 5. Romania
  - Slovenia and Hungary were promoted to the Top Division for 2023.

=== IIHF World U18 Championships ===
- Due to the suspensions of Russia and Belarus from international competition, no relegations took place at any level.
- April 23 – May 1: 2022 IIHF World U18 Championships in Landshut and Kaufbeuren, Germany
  - Sweden defeated the United States, 6–4, to win their second World U18 Championship title.
  - Finland defeated Czechia, 4–1, to win the bronze medal.

==== Divisions ====
- March 21 – 24: Division II – Group B in Sofia, Bulgaria
  - Final Round Robin placements: 1. Croatia, 2. Spain, 3. Netherlands, 4. Bulgaria, 5. China, 6. Australia
  - Croatia and Spain were promoted to Division II – Group A for 2023.
- April 3 – 9: Division II – Group A in Tallinn, Estonia
  - Final Round Robin placements: 1. South Korea, 2. Estonia, 3. Great Britain, 4. Lithuania, 5. Romania, 6. Serbia
  - South Korea and Estonia were promoted to Division I – Group B for 2023.
- April 11 – 17: Division I – Group A in Piešťany, Slovakia
  - Final Round Robin placements: 1. Slovakia, 2. Norway, 3. France, 4. Kazakhstan, 5. Denmark, 6. Japan
  - Slovakia and Norway were promoted to the Top Division for 2023.
- April 11 – 17: Division III – Group A in Istanbul, Turkey
  - Final Round Robin placements: 1. Chinese Taipei, 2. Belgium, 3. Iceland, 4. Israel, 5. Mexico, 6. Turkey
  - Chinese Taipei and Belgium were promoted to Division II – Group B for 2023.
- April 17 – 22: Division III – Group B in Sarajevo, Bosnia and Herzegovina
  - Final Round Robin placements: 1. Bosnia and Herzegovina, 2. Luxembourg, 3. South Africa, 4. New Zealand, 5. Hong Kong
  - Bosnia and Herzegovina and Luxembourg were promoted to Division III – Group A for 2023.
- April 25 – May 1: Division I – Group B in Asiago, Italy
  - Final Round Robin placements: 1. Hungary, 2. Ukraine, 3. Italy, 4. Slovenia, 5. Austria, 6. Poland
  - Hungary and Ukraine were promoted to Division I – Group A for 2023.

=== IIHF World Women's U18 Championship ===
- June 6 – 13: 2022 IIHF World Women's U18 Championship in Madison, United States
  - Canada defeated the United States, 3–2, to win their sixth World Women's U18 Championship title.
  - Finland defeated Sweden, 3–0, to win the bronze medal.
  - Germany was relegated to Division I – Group A for 2023.

==== Divisions ====
- The suspensions of Russia and Belarus resulted in no relegations within Division I.
- April 3 – 8: Division I – Group A in Győr, Hungary
  - Final Round Robin placements: 1. Japan, 2. France, 3. Italy, 4. Hungary, 5. Norway
  - Japan was promoted to the Top Division for 2023.
- June 27 – July 5: Division II in Istanbul, Turkey
  - Spain defeated Great Britain in the final.
  - Spain was promoted to Division I – Group B for 2023.
  - Kazakhstan and Iceland were relegated to Division II – Group B for 2023.
- September 6 – 11: Division I – Group B in Radenthein, Austria
  - Final Round Robin placements: 1. Austria, 2. Poland, 3. Chinese Taipei, 4. South Korea, 5. Denmark, 6. China
  - Austria was promoted to Division I – Group A for 2023.

=== IIHF Women's World Championship ===
- August 25 – September 4: 2022 IIHF Women's World Championship in Herning and Frederikshavn, Denmark
  - Canada defeated the United States, 2–1, to win their 12th Women's World Championship title.
  - Czechia defeated Switzerland, 4–2, to win the bronze medal.
  - Denmark was relegated to Division I – Group A for 2023.

==== Divisions ====
- The suspensions of Russia and Belarus resulted in no relegations below the Top Division; there were also additional promotions.
- April 3 – 8: Division II – Group A in Jaca, Spain
  - Final Round Robin placements: 1. Great Britain, 2. Latvia, 3. Spain, 4. Chinese Taipei, 5. Mexico, 6. North Korea
  - Great Britain was promoted to Division I – Group B for 2023.
- April 4 – 7: Division III – Group A in Sofia, Bulgaria
  - Final Round Robin placements: 1. Belgium, 2. Lithuania, 3. Bulgaria, 4. Romania, 5. Ukraine, (Note: Ukraine withdrew due to the Russian invasion of Ukraine) 6. Hong Kong
  - Belgium was promoted to Division II – Group B for 2023.
- April 8 – 14: Division I – Group B in Katowice, Poland
  - Final Round Robin placements: 1. China, 2. Poland, 3. Italy, 4. Kazakhstan, 5. South Korea, 6. Slovenia
  - China was promoted to Division I – Group A for 2023.
- April 24 – 30: Division I – Group A in Angers, France
  - Final Round Robin placements: 1. France, 2. Norway, 3. Slovakia, 4. Austria, 5. Netherlands
  - France was promoted to the Top Division for 2023.
- May 17 – 22: Division II – Group B in Zagreb, Croatia
  - Final Round Robin placements: 1. Iceland, 2. Australia, 3. Turkey, 4. South Africa, 5. Croatia, 6. New Zealand
  - Iceland was promoted to Division II – Group A for 2023.
- May 22 – 25: Division III – Group B in Belgrade, Serbia
  - Final Round Robin placements: 1. Estonia, 2. Serbia, 3. Bosnia and Herzegovina, 4. Israel, 5. Iran (Note: Iran withdrew from the tournament to avoid playing against Israel.)
  - Estonia was promoted to Division III – Group A for 2023.

== National Hockey League (NHL) ==
- July 21, 2021: 2021 NHL expansion draft at Gas Works Park in Seattle
  - The Seattle Kraken joined the NHL as an expansion team.
- October 12, 2021 – May 1: 2021–22 NHL season
  - Presidents' Trophy and Eastern Conference regular-season winners: Florida Panthers
  - Western Conference regular-season winners: Colorado Avalanche
  - Art Ross Trophy winner: Connor McDavid (Edmonton Oilers)
- January 1: 2022 Winter Classic at Target Field in Minneapolis
  - The St. Louis Blues defeated the Minnesota Wild, 6–4.
- February 5: 2022 All-Star Game at T-Mobile Arena in Paradise
  - All-Star Game: Team Metropolitan defeated Team Central, 5–3.
  - All-Star Game MVP: Claude Giroux (Philadelphia Flyers)
  - Accuracy Shooting: Sebastian Aho (Carolina Hurricanes)
  - Breakaway Challenge: Alex Pietrangelo (Vegas Golden Knights)
  - Fastest Skater: Jordan Kyrou (St. Louis Blues)
  - Fountain Face-off: Zach Werenski (Columbus Blue Jackets)
  - Hardest Shot: Victor Hedman (Tampa Bay Lightning)
  - NHL 21 in '22: Joe Pavelski (Dallas Stars)
  - Save Streak: Jack Campbell (Toronto Maple Leafs) and Andrei Vasilevskiy (Tampa Bay Lightning)
- February 26: 2022 Stadium Series at Nissan Stadium in Nashville
  - The Tampa Bay Lightning defeated the Nashville Predators, 3–2.
- March 13: 2022 Heritage Classic at Tim Hortons Field in Hamilton
  - The Buffalo Sabres defeated the Toronto Maple Leafs, 5–2.
- May 2 – June 26: 2022 Stanley Cup playoffs
  - June 26: The Colorado Avalanche defeat the Tampa Bay Lightning four games to two in the Stanley Cup Finals to win their third Stanley Cup.
- July 7 & 8: 2022 NHL entry draft at Bell Centre in Montreal
  - #1: Juraj Slafkovsky (to the Montreal Canadiens from HC TPS)

== Kontinental Hockey League (KHL) ==
- September 1, 2021 – January 14: 2021–22 KHL season
  - The regular season was shortened due to the COVID-19 pandemic and Winter Olympic break, having initially been scheduled to finish on March 1.
- March 1 – April 30: 2022 Gagarin Cup playoffs
  - Jokerit and Dinamo Riga withdrew from the KHL in late February due to the 2022 Russian invasion of Ukraine, with Jokerit forfeiting its playoff series against Spartak Moscow.
  - April 30: CSKA Moscow defeats Metallurg Magnitogorsk four games to three in the Gagarin Cup Finals to win their second Gagarin Cup.

== North America ==
=== American Hockey League (AHL) ===
- October 15, 2021 – April 30: 2021–22 AHL season
  - Macgregor Kilpatrick Trophy & Central Division winners: Chicago Wolves
  - Atlantic Division winners: Charlotte Checkers
  - North Division winners: Utica Comets
  - Pacific Division winners: Stockton Heat
  - May 2 – June 25: 2022 Calder Cup playoffs
    - June 25: The Chicago Wolves defeated the Springfield Thunderbirds four games to one to win their third Calder Cup title.

=== ECHL ===
- October 21, 2021 – April 17: 2021–22 ECHL season
  - Brabham Cup & Central Division winners: Toledo Walleye
  - North Division winners: Reading Royals
  - South Division winners: Florida Everblades
  - Mountain Division winners: Utah Grizzlies
  - April 20 – June 11: 2022 Kelly Cup playoffs
    - June 11: The Florida Everblades defeated the Toledo Walleye four games to one to win their second Kelly Cup title.

=== Premier Hockey Federation (PHF) ===
- November 6, 2021 – March 20: 2021–22 PHF season
  - March 25 – March 28: 2022 PHF playoffs
    - The Boston Pride defeat the Connecticut Whale, 4–2, to win their third Isobel Cup title.

=== Junior ===
==== United States Hockey League (USHL) ====
- September 23, 2021 – April 23: 2021–22 USHL season
  - Anderson Cup & Western Conference winners: Tri-City Storm
  - Eastern Conference winners: Chicago Steel
  - April 25 – May 21: 2022 Clark Cup playoffs
    - The Sioux City Musketeers defeat the Madison Capitols three games to one to win their fourth Clark Cup title.

==== Canadian Hockey League (CHL) ====
- October 1, 2021 – April 17: 2021–22 WHL season
  - Scotty Munro Memorial Trophy & East Division winners: Winnipeg Ice
  - Central Division winners: Edmonton Oil Kings
  - U.S. Division winners: Everett Silvertips
  - B.C. Division winners: Kamloops Blazers
  - April 21 – June 13: 2022 WHL playoffs
    - The Edmonton Oil Kings defeat the Seattle Thunderbirds four games to two to win their third Ed Chynoweth Cup title.
- October 1, 2021 – May 1: 2021–22 QMJHL season
  - Jean Rougeau Trophy & East Division winners: Quebec Remparts
  - Maritimes Division: Charlottetown Islanders
  - West Division: Gatineau Olympiques
  - Central Division: Sherbrooke Phoenix
  - May 5 – June 11: 2022 President's Cup playoffs
    - June 11: The Shawinigan Cataractes defeat the Charlottetown Islanders four games to one to win their first President's Cup title.
- October 7, 2021 – April 17: 2021–22 OHL season
  - Hamilton Spectator Trophy & East Division winners: Hamilton Bulldogs
  - Central Division: North Bay Battalion
  - Midwest Division: London Knights
  - West Division: Windsor Spitfires
  - April 21 – June 15: 2022 OHL playoffs
    - The Hamilton Bulldogs defeat the Windsor Spitfires four games to three to win their second J. Ross Robertson Cup title.
- June 20 – 29: 2022 Memorial Cup at TD Station in Saint John
  - The Saint John Sea Dogs defeat the Hamilton Bulldogs, 6–3, to win their second Memorial Cup title.

=== College ===
==== NCAA Division I ====
- March 10 – 20: 2022 NCAA Division I women's ice hockey tournament (Frozen Four at Pegula Ice Arena in University Park)
  - The Ohio State Buckeyes defeat the Minnesota Duluth Bulldogs, 3–2, to win their first NCAA Division I Women's Ice Hockey title.
- March 24 – April 9: 2022 NCAA Division I men's ice hockey tournament (Frozen Four at TD Garden in Boston)
  - The Denver Pioneers defeat the Minnesota State Mavericks, 5–1, to win their ninth NCAA Division I Men's Ice Hockey title.

==== U Sports ====
- March 31 – April 3: 2022 U Sports University Cup Tournament at Andrew H. McCain Arena in Wolfville
  - The UQTR Patriotes defeat the Alberta Golden Bears, 5–4 in double overtime, to win their fifth University Cup title.

== Europe ==
=== Tournaments ===
- August 26, 2021 – March 1: 2021–22 Champions Hockey League
  - (Sweden) Rögle BK defeat (Finland) Tappara, 2–1, to win their first Champions Hockey League title.
  - (Germany) EHC Red Bull München and (Sweden) Frölunda HC finished in joint third place, as the losing semi-finalists.
- September 24, 2021 – March 6: 2021–22 IIHF Continental Cup
  - Final Ranking: 1. (Poland) KS Cracovia, 2. (Kazakhstan) Saryarka Karagandy, 3. (Denmark) Aalborg Pirates, 4. (Belarus) HK Gomel (Note: HK Gomel were expelled before the start of the final round due to the Russian invasion of Ukraine.)
- December 26 – 31: 2023 Spengler Cup in (Switzerland) Davos
  - (Switzerland) HC Ambrì-Piotta defeat (Czech Republic) HC Sparta Praha, 3–2 in a shootout, to win their first Spengler Cup.

=== Leagues ===
- September 7, 2021 – March 14: 2021–22 National League season
  - March 18 – May 1: 2022 National League playoffs
    - EV Zug defeats the ZSC Lions, four games to three, to win their third National League title.
- September 8, 2021 – March 8: 2021–22 Czech Extraliga season
  - Presidential Cup winner: Mountfield HK
  - March 11 – April 28: 2022 Czech Extraliga playoffs
    - Oceláři Třinec defeats Sparta Praha four games to two to win their fifth Extraliga title.
- September 9, 2021 – March 22: 2021–22 SM-liiga season
  - March 24 – April 28: 2022 SM-liiga playoffs
    - Tappara defeats TPS, four games to one, to win their 11th SM-liiga title and 18th Finnish championship.
- September 9, 2021 – April 3: 2021–22 DEL season
  - April 5 – May 4: 2022 DEL playoffs
    - Eisbären Berlin defeat EHC Red Bull München, three games to one, to win their ninth DEL title.
- September 11, 2021 – March 24: 2021–22 SHL season
  - March 26 – May 12: 2022 SHL playoffs
    - Färjestad BK defeat Luleå HF, four games to three, to win their tenth Le Mat Trophy title.

== Asia ==
=== Asia League Ice Hockey (ALIH) ===
- 2021–22 Asia League Ice Hockey season
  - The ALIH cancelled their season for the second straight year due to the COVID-19 pandemic.

=== IIHF U20 Asia and Oceania Championship ===
- June 25 – July 2: 2022 IIHF U20 Asia and Oceania Championship in Bangkok
  - Thailand defeated Singapore, 4–3, to win their first U20 Asia and Oceania title.
  - Hong Kong defeated United Arab Emirates, 6–5, to win the bronze medal.

== Other tournaments ==
=== LATAM Cup ===
- September 14 – 18: 2022 LATAM Cup in Coral Springs, United States
  - Final Round Robin placements: 1. Argentina, 2. Puerto Rico, 3. Colombia, 4. Mexico, 5. Lebanon FCHC, 6. Brazil
  - Puerto Rico defeated Argentina, 4–3, to win their first LATAM Cup title.
  - Mexico defeated Colombia, 5–3, to win the bronze medal.

=== IIHF Development Cup ===
- May 4 – 7: 2022 IIHF Development Cup in Füssen, Germany
  - Final Ranking: 1. Colombia, 2. Liechtenstein, 3. Ireland, 4. Algeria, 5. Andorra, 6. Portugal
- November 6 – 12: 2022 IIHF Women's Development Cup in Kuwait City, Kuwait
  - Final Ranking: 1. Colombia, 2. Luxembourg, 3. Kuwait, 4. United Arab Emirates, 5. Ireland, 6. Andorra

== Deaths ==
=== January ===
- Robbie Moore, 67, Canadian ice hockey player (Philadelphia Flyers, Washington Capitals)
- Jouni Seistamo, 82, Finnish Olympic ice hockey player (1960, 1964)
- Phil Samis, 94, Canadian ice hockey player (Toronto Maple Leafs), Stanley Cup champion (1948)
- Randy Boyd, 59, Canadian ice hockey player (Pittsburgh Penguins, New York Islanders, Vancouver Canucks)
- Clark Gillies, 67, Canadian Hall of Fame ice hockey player (New York Islanders, Buffalo Sabres), four-time Stanley Cup champion
- Bill Needham, 90, Canadian ice hockey player (Grand Rapids Rockets, Toledo Hornets) and coach (Cleveland Crusaders)
- Mike Nykoluk, 87, Canadian ice hockey player and coach (Toronto Maple Leafs, Hershey Bears)

=== February ===
- Günther Knauss, 78, German Olympic ice hockey player (1968)
- Emile Francis, 95, Canadian Hall of Fame ice hockey player, coach (New York Rangers), and executive (Hartford Whalers, St. Louis Blues)
- Per Voigt, 91, Norwegian Olympic ice hockey player (1952)

=== March ===
- Gordon Kannegiesser, 76, Canadian ice hockey player (St. Louis Blues, Houston Aeros, Indianapolis Racers)
- Gerry Goyer, 85, Canadian ice hockey player (Chicago Blackhawks)
- Gary Gresdal, 75, Canadian ice hockey player (Quebec Nordiques)
- Jean Potvin, 72, Canadian ice hockey player (New York Islanders, Philadelphia Flyers, Minnesota North Stars) and radio broadcaster, Stanley Cup champion (1980, 1981)
- Alex MacLellan, 91, Canadian ice hockey player (Michigan Wolverines)
- Gil Stein, 94, American lawyer and ice hockey executive, president of the National Hockey League (1992–1993)

=== April ===
- Garrett Burnett, 46, Canadian ice hockey player (Mighty Ducks of Anaheim)
- Sergei Yashin, 60, Russian ice hockey player (Dynamo Moscow, EHC Dynamo Berlin, HC Davos), Olympic champion (1988)
- Tom McCarthy, 61, Canadian ice hockey player (Minnesota North Stars, Boston Bruins) and coach
- Mike Bossy, 65, Canadian Hall of Fame ice hockey player (New York Islanders), four-time Stanley Cup champion
- Guy Lafleur, 70, Canadian Hall of Fame ice hockey player (Montreal Canadiens, Quebec Nordiques, New York Rangers), five-time Stanley Cup champion

=== May ===
- Klaus Hirche, 82, German Olympic ice hockey player (1968)
- Lalli Partinen, 80, Finnish Olympic ice hockey player (1968)
- Sean Shanahan, 71, Canadian ice hockey player (Montreal Canadiens, Colorado Rockies, Boston Bruins)
- Yuri Morozov, 84, Russian ice hockey player (Khimik Moscow Oblast) and coach
- Larry Hillman, 85, Canadian ice hockey player (Toronto Maple Leafs, Boston Bruins, Detroit Red Wings)

=== June ===
- Paul Coppo, 83, American Olympic ice hockey player (1964)
- Eric Nesterenko, 88, Canadian ice hockey player (Chicago Blackhawks, Toronto Maple Leafs), Stanley Cup champion (1961)
- Peter Ascherl, 68, Canadian-German ice hockey player (Mannheim ERC, Düsseldorfer EG)
- Ladislav Olejník, 90, Czech ice hockey player (HC Kometa Brno) and coach (EC Bad Nauheim)
- Cho Min-ho, 35, South Korean ice hockey player (Anyang Halla, 2018 Olympic team)
- Gary Collins, 86, Canadian ice hockey player (Toronto Maple Leafs)
- Ove Malmberg, 89, Swedish Olympic ice hockey player (1956)
- Jack Gordon, 94, Canadian ice hockey general manager (Minnesota North Stars, Vancouver Canucks), coach and player (New York Rangers)
- Jay Octeau, 57, American ice hockey player (Boston University Terriers)
- Jim Pappin, 82, Canadian ice hockey player (Toronto Maple Leafs, Chicago Blackhawks, California Golden Seals), Stanley Cup champion (1964, 1967)
- Jean-Guy Gendron, 87, Canadian ice hockey player (Philadelphia Flyers, New York Rangers, Boston Bruins)

=== July ===
- Bryan Marchment, 53, Canadian ice hockey player (San Jose Sharks, Edmonton Oilers, Chicago Blackhawks)
- Rod Zaine, 76, Canadian ice hockey player (Pittsburgh Penguins, Buffalo Sabres, Chicago Cougars)
- Gil Burford, 98, American ice hockey player (Michigan Wolverines)
- Larry Jeffrey, 81, Canadian ice hockey player (Detroit Red Wings, Toronto Maple Leafs, New York Rangers)
- Kurt Pfammatter, 81, Swiss Olympic ice hockey player (1964)

=== August ===
- Terry Caffery, 73, Canadian ice hockey player (Chicago Blackhawks, Minnesota North Stars)
- Rudolf Knez, 77, Slovenian Olympic ice hockey player (1968, 1972)
- Julian Klymkiw, 89, Canadian ice hockey player (New York Rangers)
- David Tomassoni, 69, American Olympic ice hockey player (1984)
- Lyle Bradley, 79, Canadian ice hockey player (California Golden Seals, Cleveland Barons)
- Doug Ross, 70, American college ice hockey player (Bowling Green) and coach (Kent State, Alabama-Huntsville)
- Harrison Gray, 80, Canadian ice hockey player (Detroit Red Wings)
- György Pásztor, 99, Hungarian Hall of Fame ice hockey player (Budapesti Korcsolyázó Egylet, Csepel, national team) and executive
- Paul Knox, 88, Canadian ice hockey player (Toronto Maple Leafs), Olympic bronze medalist (1956)
- Orval Tessier, 89, Canadian ice hockey player (Boston Bruins, Montreal Canadiens) and coach (Chicago Blackhawks)
- Joel Baillargeon, 57, Canadian ice hockey player (Winnipeg Jets, Quebec Nordiques)

=== September ===
- Scott Campbell, 65, Canadian ice hockey player (Winnipeg Jets, St. Louis Blues)
- Dan Schachte, 64, American ice hockey linesman (NHL)
- Wally Tatomir, 76, Canadian-born American ice hockey equipment manager (Carolina Hurricanes)
- Andre Payette, 46, Canadian ice hockey player (Philadelphia Phantoms, Newcastle Vipers, Sheffield Steeldogs)
- Egil Bjerklund, 89, Norwegian Olympic ice hockey player (1952, 1964)
- Gilles Boisvert, 89, Canadian ice hockey player (Detroit Red Wings)

=== October ===
- Dave Dryden, 81, Canadian ice hockey player (New York Rangers, Chicago Blackhawks, Buffalo Sabres)
- Jim Niekamp, 76, American ice hockey player (Detroit Red Wings)
- Joe Crozier, 93, Canadian ice hockey player (Toronto Maple Leafs) and coach (Buffalo Sabres, Rochester Americans)
- Louis Denis, 94, Canadian ice hockey player (Montreal Canadiens)
- Hal Jones, 89, Canadian ice hockey player (Trail Smoke Eaters)
- Ștefan Ionescu, 87, Romanian Olympic ice hockey player (1964, 1968)

=== November ===
- Steven Griffith, 61, American Olympic ice hockey player (1984)
- Brent Pope, 49, Canadian ice hockey player (Cardiff Devils, Slough Jets, London Racers)
- Val Delory, 95, Canadian ice hockey player (New York Rangers)
- Peter McNab, 70, Canadian-born American ice hockey player (Boston Bruins, Buffalo Sabres) and broadcaster (Altitude)
- Alexander Martynyuk, 77, Russian ice hockey player (Spartak Moscow, Soviet Union national team)
- Börje Salming, 71, Swedish Hall of Fame ice hockey player (Toronto Maple Leafs, Detroit Red Wings, Brynäs IF)
- Edward Leier, 95, Polish-born Canadian ice hockey player (Chicago Blackhawks)
- Danny Belisle, 85, Canadian ice hockey player (New York Rangers) and coach (Washington Capitals)
- Mike Addesa, 77, American college ice hockey coach (Holy Cross, Rensselaer, Boston Bulldogs)
- Mike Blake, 66, Canadian ice hockey player (Los Angeles Kings)
- Steve Jensen, 67, American Olympic ice hockey player (1976)
- Steve Witiuk, 93, Canadian ice hockey player (Chicago Blackhawks)

=== December ===
- Barry Fraser, 82, Canadian ice hockey executive (Edmonton Oilers)
- Jan-Åke Edvinsson, 81, Swedish Hall of Fame ice hockey administrator, general secretary of IIHF (1986–2006)
- Jacques Pousaz, 75, Swiss Olympic ice hockey player (1972)
- Jackie McLeod, 92, Canadian ice hockey player (New York Rangers) and coach (national team, Saskatoon Blades)
- Kevin Schamehorn, 66, Canadian ice hockey player (Detroit Red Wings, Los Angeles Kings)
- Barry Cullen, 87, Canadian ice hockey player (Toronto Maple Leafs, Detroit Red Wings, Buffalo Bisons)
- Don McKenney, 88, Canadian ice hockey player (Boston Bruins, New York Rangers) and coach (Northeastern Huskies)
- Lajos Koutny, 83, Hungarian Olympic ice hockey player (1964)
- Ludwik Synowiec, 64, Polish Olympic ice hockey player (1980, 1984)
- Dave Richardson, 82, Canadian ice hockey player (New York Rangers, Chicago Blackhawks, Detroit Red Wings)
- Sergei Bautin, 55, Russian ice hockey player (Winnipeg Jets, Detroit Red Wings, San Jose Sharks), Olympic champion (1992)
