= Jim Aldred =

Canadian ice hockey player and coach (born 1963)

- Born: April 28, 1963 (age 63) Toronto, Ontario, Canada
- Height: 6 ft 2 in (188 cm)
- Weight: 185 lb (84 kg; 13 st 3 lb)
- Position: Left winger
- Shot: Left
- Played for: Rochester Americans; Flint Generals; Toledo Goaldiggers; Nijmegen Tigers
- Current LNHH coach: HC Porto
- Coached for: Shelburne Red Wings; Vaughan Stars; Alliston Coyotes; Lycksele SK
- National team: Portugal
- NHL draft: 59th overall, 1981; Buffalo Sabres
- Playing career: 1983–1988
- Coaching career: 2010–present

James Aldred (born April 28, 1963) is a Canadian ice hockey coach and former player. He played four seasons in the Ontario Hockey League, and was drafted 59th overall in the 1981 National Hockey League entry draft by the Buffalo Sabres. After four seasons combined in the American Hockey League and the International Hockey League, he won an Eredivisie championship in the Netherlands with the Nijmegen Tigers. Retiring due to injuries, Aldred turned to coaching four seasons in the Greater Metro Junior A Hockey League.

Moving to Portugal in 2017, Aldred became head coach of the Portugal men's national ice hockey team which has competed at every Development Cup organized by the International Ice Hockey Federation (IIHF). After one season coaching in Sweden, he returned to Portugal teaching at hockey camps for children, founded the Luso Lynx recreational hockey club, established a three-on-three hockey league, and founded the professional club HC Porto which began play in the Spanish Liga Nacional de Hockey Hielo in 2023. He was recognized by the IIHF for contributions to developing youth ice hockey, with the Johan Bollue Award in 2025.

== Early life and minor ice hockey ==
James Aldred was born on April 28, 1963, in Toronto, Ontario. He began playing ice hockey as a four-year-old, and had a backyard rink at his house. He played minor ice hockey with the Humber Valley club in the Etobicoke Hockey Association, and later played in the Greater Toronto Hockey League.

== Playing career ==
=== Junior ice hockey ===
Aldred began playing junior ice hockey in 1978. He was a left-handed shooter, listed at 6 feet 2 inches (1.88 m) and 185 pounds (84 kg). During the 1978–79 season, he played for the Toronto Red Wings in the Metro Junior B Hockey League, and the Aurora Tigers in the Ontario Provincial Junior A Hockey League. He scored 22 goals and 44 points for Aurora, and was an offensive-minded player ranked 22nd by the Ontario Major Junior Hockey League (OMJHL) scouting bureau for the upcoming draft.

Primarily a defenceman at the time, he was drafted 30th overall by the Kingston Canadians in the third round of the OMJHL midget priority draft. Kingston's coach and general manager Jim Morrison chose a defenceman with each of his first three picks, looking to solidify the team's defence. Seeking to earn his way onto the team, Aldred had daily skating sessions during the summer even though he was guaranteed a place on the team as a midget draft pick. At training camp, Morrison felt that Aldred handled the puck well and was a good skater. Battling injuries during the 1979–80 OMJHL season, Aldred missed two months with a broken collarbone, then upon his return in February, missed the remainder of the season and playoffs with a separated shoulder. In 16 games played, Aldred scored one point and had nine penalty minutes.

In his second season with the Canadians, Aldred played 67 Ontario Hockey League (OHL) games. He led all rookies on the Canadians with 20 goals and 48 points in the 1980–81 OHL season, and scored the sixth-most points on the team. In the divisional playoffs series victory versus the Ottawa 67's, Aldred scored consecutive game-winning goals in the first two games. The Canadians were eliminated in the divisional finals in six games versus the Sault Ste. Marie Greyhounds. He was subsequently drafted 59th overall in the 1981 National Hockey League entry draft by the Buffalo Sabres in the third round. He was the first of five Canadians selected in the draft, and the first North American-born player chosen by the Sabres that year.

Aldred scored two goals and six points in the first ten games of the 1981–82 OHL season with the Canadians. Looking to increase goal scoring, the Canadians traded Aldred and Chuck Brimmer to the Greyhounds in November, in exchange for Ron Handy and a fifth-round draft pick. Greyhounds' coach Terry Crisp expected to use Aldred's size as a left winger, and in the corners of the rink. The Sault Star described Aldred as "big, tough, aggressive, and he can score", and as a "mucker", who was best suited to play in the corners and in front of the opposing team's goal. He scored 16 goals and 31 points in the remainder of the regular season for the Greyhounds, and had four goals and 54 penalty minutes in 12 postseason games. In the playoffs, the Greyhounds defeated the Brantford Alexanders in a seven-game series, then lost in five games to the Kitchener Rangers in the division finals.

In the 1982–83 OHL season, Aldred scored 22 goals for his career best in the OHL. He led the Greyhounds with 176 penalty minutes, the tenth highest total in the OHL. The Greyhound placed first in the league during the regular season, received a first-round playoffs bye, defeated the Alexanders in five games in the second round, defeated the Rangers in seven games in the division finals, then lost in the OHL finals versus the Oshawa Generals in four games. In 16 playoffs games, he scored two goals, ten points, and had 46 penalty minutes.

=== Professional ice hockey ===
The Buffalo Sabres assigned Aldred to their farm team, the Rochester Americans in the American Hockey League (AHL). Playing for coaches Joe Crozier and Yvon Lambert, Aldred "impressed [them] with his aggressive play during [training] camp", and scored a game-winning power play goal in his first exhibition game. Shifting permanently from defenceman to left winger, Aldred completed the 1983–84 AHL season with 10 goals and 19 points in 64 games. In the playoffs, the Americans defeated the St. Catharines Saints in seven games in round one, then defeated the Baltimore Skipjacks in six games in the second round. Not playing since game two of the second round, Aldred scored a first-period goal in a game-four overtime loss during the Calder Cup finals versus the Maine Mariners. The Americans lost the Calder Cup finals in five games, with Aldred scoring two goals in 11 playoff games.

In October 1984, the Buffalo Sabres assigned Aldred to play for the Flint Generals in the International Hockey League (IHL). The Generals were the defending Turner Cup champions, and Aldred scored the first goal of the team's home opener in the 1984–85 IHL season. He played right wing for the Generals, but missed two weeks in November with an injured knee. He was called up to Rochester on December 7, then sent back to Flint four days later after appearing in two games for the Americans in the 1984–85 AHL season. On January 11, 1985, Flint's coach and general manager Dennis Desrosiers, traded Aldred and Don Waddell to the Toledo Goaldiggers in exchange for Bill Joyce and Mark Plantery. At the IHL deadline to reduce rosters for the playoffs, Aldred was placed on waivers then released by the Goaldiggers in March. During the 1984–85 IHL season, he played in 52 games, scoring 12 goals and 18 points.

Returning to the Toledo Goaldiggers for the 1985–86 IHL season, Aldred scored 9 goals and 26 points in 51 games played, and accrued 110 penalty minutes. Following a spitting incident with an on-ice official on February 22, Aldred was suspended for the remainder of the IHL season. He was supposed to have been called up to the Americans, but could not play in the AHL until the suspension expired on March 10. He scored one goal and four points in 10 games with the Americans, but did not appear in the 1985–86 AHL season playoffs since he was signed after the December 15 deadline. He became a free agent after the season when not offered a contract.

Aldred tried out with the Flint Spirits of the International Hockey League, but was released during training camp for the 1986–87 IHL season.

After not playing for a season, Aldred joined the Nijmegen Tigers of the Eredivisie in the Netherlands. In the 1987–88 Eredivisie season, he scored 40 goals and 88 points in 41 games. His point total was ninth best in the league, and second best on the Tigers behind Robert Forbes with 122 points. The Tigers placed second in the league cup, placed first in the playoffs round-robin, then defeated the Rotterdam Pandas in five games in the semifinals, and defeated the Heerenveen Flyers in four games to win the playoffs championship. Aldred retired from playing after the season, when battling more frequent injuries.

=== Playing statistics ===
			Regular season					Playoffs
Season	Team	League	GP	G	A	Pts	PIM	GP	G	A	Pts	PIM
1978–79	Aurora Tigers	OPJAHL	38	22	22	44	–	–	–	–	–	–
1978–79	Toronto Red Wings	MetJBHL	–	–	–	–	–	–	–	–	–	–
1979–80	Kingston Canadians	OMJHL	16	0	1	1	9	–	–	–	–	–
1980–81	Kingston Canadians	OHL	67	20	28	48	140	–	–	–	–	–
1981–82	Kingston Canadians	OHL	10	2	4	6	18	–	–	–	–	–
1981–82	Sault Ste. Marie Greyhounds	OHL	43	16	15	31	179	12	4	3	7	54
1982–83	Sault Ste. Marie Greyhounds	OHL	63	22	22	44	176	16	2	8	10	46
1983–84	Rochester Americans	AHL	64	10	9	19	57	11	2	0	2	33
1984–85	Flint Generals	IHL	28	5	3	8	10	–	–	–	–	–
1984–85	Rochester Americans	AHL	2	0	0	0	0	–	–	–	–	–
1984–85	Toledo Goaldiggers	IHL	24	7	3	10	16	–	–	–	–	–
1985–86	Toledo Goaldiggers	IHL	51	9	17	26	110	–	–	–	–	–
1985–86	Rochester Americans	AHL	10	1	3	4	4	–	–	–	–	–
1987–88	Nijmegen Tigers	Eredivisie	41	40	48	88	0	–	–	–	–	–
OMJHL/OHL totals			199	60	70	130	522	28	6	11	17	100
AHL totals			76	11	12	23	61	11	2	0	2	33
IHL totals			103	21	23	44	136	–	–	–	–	–

== Coaching career ==
=== Greater Metro Junior A Hockey League ===
Coaching in junior ice hockey, Aldred guided the Shelburne Red Wings in the Greater Metro Junior A Hockey League (GMHL) during the 2010–11 season. The Red Wings were described as "the first foreign junior hockey team in Canada", with a roster of mostly Russian-born players, made possible since the GMHL had no limits on foreign-born players. Aldred felt that the Russian players were tough on each other and needed strict guidance, and that he was privileged to coach them coming to Canada to "better themselves" despite his suspension by Hockey Canada for coaching in an unaffiliated league. His initial game strategy was based on his players' strengths in stickhandling, skating, and goal scoring, then switched to improving defensive zone coverage. The Red Wings earned 25 wins in 42 games, placing fifth in the GMHL with 52 points.

In the 2011–12 GMHL season, Aldred became head coach of the Vaughan Stars, playing home games at Canlan Ice Sports at York University. He led Vaughan to 11 wins in 16 games, until the GMHL revoked their membership on November 28, ending the season. Aldred subsequently worked as a power skating instructor throughout Ontario.

Joining the Alliston Coyotes to develop players during the 2014–15 GMHL season, Aldred's team placed seventh in the South Division with 20 wins in 42 games, and 40 points. Seeking a "positive impact on the players, both personally and professionally", he returned for the 2015–16 GMHL season, he developed a fast-skating, and puck-possession team, using systems-oriented coaching. He focused on defensive zone coverage, and let the players create their own play in the attacking zone. Alliston led the Central Division with 28 wins in 31 games by January, with Aldred and two of his players named to Team World in the league's all-star game. Alliston finished the season second place in the Central Division with 36 wins in 42 games, having led the division for most of the season until surpassed by the Tottenham Steam

Aldred was hired to coach the Tottenham Steam for the 2016–17 GMHL season by the team's new owners, but was replaced by Dennis Maruk before the season began.

=== Beginnings in Portugal ===
In 2016, Aldred relocated to Portugal with his wife. After approximately one year of what he described as "drinking wine and eating good food", Aldred became bored after the "beach season ended". (Note: Statement is a combination of two quotes: "Portugal is a beautiful country but my love is ice hockey and I got kind of bored with nothing much to do after the beach season ended". "We came here and, for a year or so, I was on the beach, drinking wine and eating good food, but I'm a hockey man".) Looking to return to hockey, he searched online to locate a group in Sintra who played inline hockey, and on temporary ice rinks at Christmas markets at shopping malls in winter. The largest rink in Portugal at the time was inside a converted bullring in Elvas, which was not a regulation-sized rink for hockey. He joined them and conducted training sessions at Coliseu de Elvas, and the shopping mall UBBO [Dolce Vita Tejo], and entered the team into tournaments. Their talent was noticed by the International Ice Hockey Federation (IIHF) at an event in Spain, which led to the players affiliating with the Portuguese Winter Sports Federation (FDIP) and an invitation to oversee the Portugal men's national ice hockey team, with Aldred as the coach and his wife as the manager. Joining the FDIP provided financial support for the team, which Aldred and the players had paid for all travel themselves until then.

The first international event Aldred coached for Portugal was the inaugural IIHF Development Cup, hosted in Andorra in 2017. Winning their debut game in a shootout by a 3–2 score versus the Andorra national team, Portugal had losses to the Ireland national team and the Morocco national team. In the third-place match, Portugal defeated Andorra by a 5–3 score for the bronze medal. Later in 2017, Aldred led Portugal to a second-place finish at a ten-team tournament in his former hometown of Nijmegen. Returning to the Development Cup in 2018, Aldred added players from the Portuguese diaspora to earned a silver medal, following a loss by a 4–5 score to the North Macedonia national team. Portugal had two wins and one loss, and scored 27 goals in three tournament games.

In 2018, Aldred established the Luso Lynx Hockey Club, based in Sintra, which became the first club affiliated with the FDIP. The Lynx played in the amateur Andalusian Hockey League in Spain, where the team travelled to Granada to play several games in a weekend.

=== Move to Sweden ===
Aldred coached Lycksele SK senior team for the 2018–19 season, in the third division of ice hockey in Sweden. He also oversaw the junior team, and training at the Tannbergsskolan high school. His senior team earned promotion to the Sweden second division for the 2019–20 season, but chose not to return due to family reasons.

=== Return to Portugal ===
Since 2021, Aldred has conducted regular practices for children at Serra da Estrela arena in Covilhã, and coordinated travel to youth games Majadahonda, Spain. Early interest in youth hockey in Portugal came from expatriate families wanting their children to play. He since planned certification sessions for hockey officials and coaches, and sought sponsors and volunteers to grow the program. To expand hockey in Portugal, Aldred and his wife have visited many schools to demonstrate the game, and used word of mouth and social media to get children interested in playing. He also helped create a three-on-three hockey league including the Luso Lynx and three other teams, with games played at Serra da Estrela.

Aldred has cited the lack of a standard-sized rink as the primary obstacle to developing ice hockey in Portugal, and that the country only has temporary ice rinks for half of the year. He stated that governments and municipalities are not interested in hockey, making it difficult to obtain land in a large city. In collaborating with the FDIP, Aldred hopes for a rink in the Lisbon metropolitan area, in addition to the rink planned in the Porto metropolitan area. An olympic-sized rink with 600 seats is scheduled to open in Trofa in 2025, to provide a training facility and allow Portugal to host IIHF events.

==== HC Porto ====
Seeking to raise hockey's profile in Portugal, Aldred established HC Porto in 2023, a professional team playing in the top-level Spanish league. HC Porto was the fourth team to affiliate with the FDIP, and joined the Liga Nacional de Hockey Hielo in Spain. Under the agreement to join, HC Porto was ineligible to compete for the Spanish championship, and played its "home" games at the arena of the opposing team. During the 2023–24 season, HC Porto won seven of its 14 games, and placed fifth of eight teams.

In 2024, the FDIP and the Spanish Ice Sports Federation established the Liga Ibérica de Hóquei no Gelo, encompassing the Iberian Peninsula and allowing any team to win the championship. HC Porto's first game of the season was delayed when the players' equipment did not arrive on the same flight as them. Their opponent, SAD Majadahonda, loaned their away jerseys and extra equipment to play the game, which HC Porto lost by a 5–1 score. When the lost equipment arrived, the next day's game was played resulting in 2–1 victory for HC Porto. Aldred's team won nine of their 18 games in the 2024–25 season, placing fourth of seven teams.

HC Porto also competes in the Portugal national 3-on-3 tournament. Aldred led his team to the inaugural championship for the 2023–24 season, placing first in the four-team round-robin with 10 points. They repeated as national champions in the 2024–25 season, being undefeated in the regular season and playoffs.

==== International hockey ====
When the IIHF Development Cup resumed in 2022, Aldred coached the Portugal national team each year since. After two consecutive cups without winning a game, (Note: Portugal were winless in five games in 2022. Portugal were winless in four games in 2023.) Portugal placed second at the 2024 Development Cup with a loss to the Ireland national team by a 5–1 score in the final game.

In 2024, Aldred completed the USA Hockey Level 4 coach certification course for international competitions. At the 2025 IIHF Development Cup in Andorra, Portugal won the bronze medal with three wins in five games. Aldred led his team to victories versus Brazil, Andorra, and Greece, but lost by a 1–2 score versus Puerto Rico, and lost by a 4–5 score versus Liechtenstein. He was recognized by the IIHF for contributions to developing youth ice hockey, with the Johan Bollue Award presented during the 2025 IIHF World Championship in Sweden.

=== Coaching statistics ===
==== Greater Metro Junior A Hockey League ====
Season	Team	League	Games	Won	Lost	Overtime loss	Goals for	Goals against	Points	Standing
2010–11	Shelburne Red Wings	GMHL	42	25	15	2	230	195	52	5th of 13 in GMHL
2011–12	Vaughan Stars	GMHL	16	11	4	1	76	59	23	Franchise revoked
2014–15	Alliston Coyotes	GMHL	42	20	22	0	211	213	40	7th South Division
2015–16	Alliston Coyotes	GMHL	42	36	5	1	328	110	73	2nd Central Division
GMHL totals			142	92	46	4	845	577	188	

==== IIHF Development Cup ====
Year	National team	Games	Won	Lost	Goals for	Goals against	Points	Standing
2017	Portugal	4	2	2	14	25	4	(bronze) Third place
2018	Portugal	3	2	1	27	11	4	(silver) Second place
2022	Portugal	5	0	5	8	52	0	Sixth place
2023	Portugal	4	0	4	2	48	0	Fifth place
2024	Portugal	5	4	1	35	24	8	(silver) Second place
2025	Portugal	5	3	2	37	11	6	(bronze) Third place
Totals		26	11	15	123	171	22	2 silver 2 bronze

==== Spanish hockey leagues ====
Season	Team	League	Games	Won	Lost	Overtime win	Goals for	Goals against	Points	Standing
2023–24	HC Porto	LNHH	14	7	7	0	58	65	21	5th of 8
2024–25	HC Porto	LIHG	18	9	8	1	88	74	29	4th of 7
LNHH / LIHG totals			32	16	15	1	146	139	50	

== Personal life ==
After retiring from playing professionally, Aldred returned to Sault Ste. Marie, Ontario, and worked in the painting and interior decorating business. He later played recreational men's hockey, participated in alumni games for the Greyhounds, and was an assistant coach for the Ramada Inn Canadians AAA midget team.

Aldred married in Sault St. Marie, to Cristina Lopes from Portugal. They moved to Torres Novas in 2016, to be closer to her elderly parents, and have lived in Covilhã since 2021.
