= IIHF Men's Development Cup 2018 =

2018 IIHF Development Cup
Tournament details
- Host country: Germany
- City: Füssen
- Venue: 1 (in 1 host city)
- Dates: November 19 - November 21
- Teams: 4

Final positions
- Champions: North Macedonia (1st title)
- Runners-up: Portugal
- Third place: Ireland

Tournament statistics
- Games played: 10

The second edition of the IIHF Development Cup was hosted by Füssen, Germany. The North Macedonia won the tournament, defeating Portugal by a 9–3 score in the final game.

North Macedonia was making its first appearance at a Development Cup. Portugal was coached by Jim Aldred, who added players from the Portuguese diaspora to fill out his roster. Players for Andorra were mostly from the nation’s only club, Andorra Hoquei Gel in Canillo.

== Participants ==
- Andorra
- Ireland
- North Macedonia
- Portugal

== Group stage ==
Pos	Team	Pld	W	OTW	OTL	L	GF	GA	GD	Pts	Qualification
1	North Macedonia	3	3	0	0	0	23	14	+9	9	Advence to Semi Finals
2	Portugal	3	2	0	0	1	27	11	+16	6	Advence to Semi Finals
3	Ireland	3	1	0	0	2	16	25	−9	3	Advence to Semi Finals
4	Andorra	3	0	0	0	3	10	26	−16	0	Advence to Semi Finals

Updated to match(es) played on unknown. Source:

=== Schedule and results ===
All times are local UTC+1

19 November 2018; 10:00	Ireland	6–9 (2–3, 4–4, 0–2)	North Macedonia	Füssen, Germany

Game reference

19 November 2018; 12:00	Andorra	2–11 (0–4, 1–3, 1–4)	Portugal	Füssen, Germany

Game reference

19 November 2018; 18:00	Andorra	4–9 (1–4, 0–4, 3–1)	North Macedonia	Füssen, Germany

Game reference

19 November 2018; 20:00	Ireland	4–12 (0–7, 2–2, 2–3)	Portugal	Füssen, Germany

Game reference

20 November 2018; 10:00	North Macedonia	5–4 (2–3, 3–1, 0–0)	Portugal	Füssen, Germany

Game reference

20 November 2018; 12:00	Andorra	4–6 (1–1, 2–0, 1–5)	Ireland	Füssen, Germany

Game reference

== Playoffs ==
Semi Finals
20 November
1 North Macedonia	6
4 Andorra	3
20 November
2 Portugal	10
3 Ireland	1

Finals
21 November
1 North Macedonia	9
2 Portugal	3
Third place
21 November
3 Ireland	8
4 Andorra	7

=== Semi finals ===
20 November 2018; 18:00	Portugal	10–1 (4–1, 5–0, 1–0)	Ireland	Füssen, Germany

Game reference

20 November 2018; 20:00	North Macedonia	6–3 (3–0, 1–0, 2–3)	Andorra	Füssen, Germany

Game reference

=== Bronze medal game ===
21 November 2018; 16:00	Ireland	8–7 (2–3, 3–3, 3–1)	Andorra	Füssen, Germany

Game reference

=== Gold medal game ===
21 November 2018; 19:00	North Macedonia	9–3 (3–1, 4–0, 2–2)	Portugal	Füssen, Germany

Game reference

== Final rankings ==
Pos	Team	Pld	W	OTW	OTL	L	GF	GA	GD	Pts	Final Result
1	North Macedonia	5	5	0	0	0	38	20	+18	15	Champions
2	Portugal	5	3	0	0	2	40	21	+19	9	Runners-Up
3	Ireland	5	2	0	0	3	25	42	−17	6	Third Place
4	Andorra	5	0	0	0	5	20	40	−20	0	

Updated to match(es) played on unknown. Source:
