= IIHF Men's Development Cup 2022 =

2022 IIHF Development Cup
Tournament details
- Host country: Germany
- City: Füssen
- Venue: 1 (in 1 host city)
- Dates: May 4 - May 7
- Teams: 6

Final positions
- Champions: Colombia (1st title)
- Runners-up: Liechtenstein
- Third place: Ireland

Tournament statistics
- Games played: 15

The 3rd edition of the IIHF Development Cup was hosted by Füssen, Germany. With Colombia winning the tournament.

== Participants ==
- Algeria
- Andorra
- Colombia
- Ireland
- Liechtenstein
- Portugal

== Group stage ==
Pos	Team	Pld	W	D	L	GF	GA	GD	Pts	Final Result
1	Colombia	5	4	1	0	41	11	+30	13	Champions
2	Liechtenstein	5	4	0	1	30	15	+15	12	Runners-Up
3	Ireland	5	2	2	1	34	26	+8	8	Third Place
4	Algeria	5	2	0	3	32	35	−3	6	
5	Andorra	5	1	1	3	30	36	−6	4	
6	Portugal	5	0	0	5	8	52	−44	0	

Updated to match(es) played on unknown. Source:

=== Schedule and results ===
All times are local UTC+2

4 May 2022; 14:00	Algeria	14–5	Andorra	Füssen, Germany

Game reference

4 May 2022; 16:30	Liechtenstein	7–6	Ireland	Füssen, Germany

Game reference

4 May 2022; 19:00	Colombia	16–3	Portugal	Füssen, Germany

Game reference

5 May 2022; 8:00	Ireland	7–6	Algeria	Füssen, Germany

Game reference

5 May 2022; 10:30	Andorra	3–8	Colombia	Füssen, Germany

Game reference

5 May 2022; 13:00	Portugal	0–3	Liechtenstein	Füssen, Germany

Game reference

5 May 2022; 15:30	Ireland	6–6	Andorra	Füssen, Germany

Game reference

5 May 2022; 18:00	Portugal	1–9	Algeria	Füssen, Germany

Game reference

5 May 2022; 20:30	Colombia	3–1	Liechtenstein	Füssen, Germany

Game reference

6 May 2022; 14:00	Andorra	12–0	Portugal	Füssen, Germany

Game reference

6 May 2022; 16:30	Liechtenstein	11–2	Algeria	Füssen, Germany

Game reference

6 May 2022; 19:00	Ireland	3–3	Colombia	Füssen, Germany

Game reference

7 May 2022; 14:00	Algeria	1–11	Colombia	Füssen, Germany

Game reference

7 May 2022; 16:30	Andorra	4–8	Liechtenstein	Füssen, Germany

Game reference

7 May 2022; 19:00	Portugal	4–12	Ireland	Füssen, Germany

Game reference
