= Liechtenstein Eishockey-Nationalliga =

Top-tier men's ice hockey league in Liechtenstein

Eishockey-Nationalliga
- Sport: Ice hockey
- Founded: 2025; 1 year ago
- Administrator: LEIV
- No. of teams: 4
- Country: Liechtenstein
- Most recent champion: Mauren Warriors
- Most titles: Mauren Warriors (2)
- Level on pyramid: 1
- Relegation to: None

The Eishockey-Nationalliga (English: Ice Hockey-National League) is the top and only ice hockey league in Liechtenstein. It is administered by the Liechtenstein Ice Hockey Federation (LEIV), an associate member of the IIHF.

== History ==
In October 2024, it was announced that Liechtenstein would create its first-ever ice hockey league which would begin play with four teams on 26 January 2025. The creation of the league was a step toward gaining full membership in the International Ice Hockey Federation following the country's successes in the IIHF Development Cup. It was announced that games would be played in the nearby Swiss towns of Widnau and Grüsch as there is no indoor arena in Liechtenstein. Previously, the country's only club, EHC Vaduz-Schellenberg competed in the lower levels of Austrian and Swiss league systems. After the first two matchdays, the Vaduz-Schellenberg Nobles held an early lead in the league standings with the final set to be played on 9 March. The Mauren Warriors defeated the Balzers Lynxes 8–2 to win the league's inaugural title. Following a 3–3 score at the end of regulation, Vaduz-Schellenberg defeated the Triesen Hurricane Hobes on a penalty shootout to secure third place.

== Format ==
The league plays using a modified 3-on-3 format including three skaters and a goalie on each team. The rules and format were developed with and approved by the IIHF. In the process, Liechtenstein became the first country to play its national championship in this format.

== Current teams ==
Eishockey-Nationalliga Teams: 2025 Season
Team	Municipality	Joined league		
Team	Vaduz-Schellenberg Nobles	Joined league	Vaduz	2025
Mauren Warriors	Mauren	2025		
Balzers Lynxes	Balzers	2025		
Triesen Hurricane Hobes	Triesen	2025		

== Season results ==
Year	Champions	Runner-Up	Third	Fourth
2025	Mauren Warriors	Balzers Lynxes	Vaduz-Schellenberg Nobles	Triesen Hurricane Hobes
2026	Mauren Warriors	Balzers Lynxes	Vaduz-Schellenberg Nobles	Triesen Hurricane Hobes

== See also ==
- Liechtenstein Ice Hockey Federation
- Liechtenstein national ice hockey team
