= List of member federations of the International Skating Union =

This is a list of federations that are members of International Skating Union (ISU). As of 6 May 2025, there are 102 member federations.

In many countries, figure skating and speed skating are governed by different federations, but both can be members of the ISU; the national federations are ISU members for figure skating, for speed skating or for both. Some of these national federations also govern other sports in their countries, but are not ISU members in that capacity. Apart from the national governing bodies, there are also some old skating clubs which are members in their own rights.

== European members (57 national + 2 club members) ==
The remainder of this section is a complete list ordered by IOC country codes.

#	IOC Code	Nation	Admitted	Federation	Membership	Note
1	AND	Andorra	1995	Andorran Federation of Ice Sports / Federació Andorrana d'Esports de Gel	Figure skating	
2	ARM	Armenia	1994	Figure Skating Federation of Armenia	Figure skating	
3	AUT	Austria	1995	Skate Austria / Österreichischer Eiskunstlauf Verband	Figure skating	
4	AUT	Austria	1995	Austria Speed Skating Association / Österreichischer Eisschnelllauf Verband	Speed skating	
5	AZE	Azerbaijan	1993	Azerbaijan Winter Sports Federation	Figure skating	
6	BEL	Belgium	1979	Federation Royale Belge de Patinage Artistique	Figure skating	
7	BEL	Belgium	1979	Federation Royale Belge De Patinage De Vitesse / Koninklijke Belgische Snelschaatsfederatie	Speed skating	
8	BIH	Bosnia and Herzegovina	1994	Skating Federation Of Bosnia and Herzegovina	Figure skating & speed skating	
9	BLR	Belarus	1992	Skating Union of Belarus / Белорусский союз конькобежцев	Figure skating & speed skating	
10	BUL	Bulgaria	1967	Bulgarian Skating Federation	Figure skating & speed skating	
11	CRO	Croatia	1992	Croatian Skating Federation / Hrvatski klizački savez	Figure skating & speed skating	
12	CYP	Cyprus	1995	Cyprus Skating Federation	Figure skating	
13	CZE	Czech Republic	1923	Czech Figure Skating Association / Český krasobruslařský svaz	Figure skating	Originally represented Czechoslovakia
14	CZE	Czech Republic	1991	Czech Speed Skating Federation / Český svaz rychlobruslení	Speed skating	
15	DEN	Denmark	1913	Danish Skate Union / Dansk Skøjte Union	Figure skating & speed skating	
16	ESP	Spain	1956	Spanish Ice Sports Federation / Federación Española de Deportes de Hielo	Figure skating & speed skating	
17	EST	Estonia	1928	The Estonian Skating Union	Figure skating & speed skating	
18	FIN	Finland	1960	Skating Finland / Suomen Taitoluisteluliitto	Figure skating	
19	FIN	Finland	1908	Finnish Speed Skating Association / Suomen Luisteluliitto	Speed skating	
20	FRA	France	1908	French Federation of Ice Sports / Fédération Française des Sports de Glace	Figure skating & speed skating	
21	GBR	Great Britain	1892	British Ice Skating	Figure skating & speed skating	Founding member
22	GEO	Georgia	1992	Georgian Figure Skating Federation	Figure skating	
23	GER	Germany	1950	German Skating Union / Deutsche Eislauf-Union e.V.	Figure skating	
24	GER	Germany	1950	German Speed Skating Community / Deutsche Eisschnelllauf-Gemeinschaft	Speed skating	
25	GRE	Greece	2015	Hellenic Winter Sports Federation / Ελληνική Ομοσπονδία Xειμερινών Αθλημάτων	Figure skating	
26	HUN	Hungary	1908	Hungarian National Skating Federation / Magyar Országos Korcsolyázó Szövetség	Figure skating & speed skating	
27	IRL	Republic of Ireland	2008	Ice Skating Association of Ireland	Figure skating & speed skating	
28	ISL	Iceland	2000	Icelandic Skating Association / Skautasamband Íslands	Figure skating	
29	ISR	Israel	1992	Israel Ice Skating Federation	Figure skating & speed skating	
30	ITA	Italy	1927	Italian Ice Sports Federation / Federazione Italiana Sport Del Ghiaccio	Figure skating & speed skating	
31	LAT	Latvia	1926	Latvian Skating Association	Figure skating & speed skating	
32	LIE	Liechtenstein	2014	Liechtensteinian Skating Association / Liechtensteiner Eislauf Verband	Figure skating	
33	LTU	Lithuania	1980	Lithuanian Skating Federation	Figure skating	
34	LTU	Lithuania	1980	Lithuanian Speed Skating Association	Speed skating	
35	LUX	Luxembourg	1971	Luxembourgian Union of Skating / Union Luxembourgeoise de Patinage	Figure skating	
36	LUX	Luxembourg	1996	Luxembourgian Union of Speed Skating / Union Luxembourgeoise de Patinage de Vitesse	Speed skating	
37	MDA	Moldova	2014	Figure Skating Federation of the Republic of Moldova	Figure skating	
38	MKD	North Macedonia	2017	Skating Federation of North Macedonia / Федерација за Лизгачки Спортови на Македl	Figure skating	
39	MON	Monaco	2003	Federation Monegasque De Patinage	Figure skating	
40	NED	Netherlands	1892	Royal Dutch Skating Federation / Koninklijke Nederlandsche Schaatsenrijders Bond	Figure skating & speed skating	Founding member
41	NOR	Norway	1894	Norwegian Skating Association / Norges Skøyteforbund	Figure skating & speed skating	
42	POL	Poland	1987	Polish Figure Skating Association	Figure skating	
43	POL	Poland	1925	Polish Speed Skating Association / Polski Związek Łyżwiarstwa Szybkiego	Speed skating	
44	POR	Portugal	2021	Portuguese Winter Sports Federation / Federação de Desportos de Inverno de Portugal	Figure skating & speed skating	
45	ROU	Romania	1933	Romanian Skating Federation	Figure skating & speed skating	
46	RUS	Russia	1991	Figure Skating Federation of Russia / Федерация фигурного катания на коньках России	Figure skating	
47	RUS	Russia	1991	Russian Skating Union / Союз конькобежцев России	Speed skating	
48	SLO	Slovenia	1992	Slovene Skating Union	Figure skating & speed skating	
49	SRB	Serbia	2006	Serbian Skating Association	Figure skating & speed skating	
50	SUI	Switzerland	1911	Swiss Ice Skating	Figure skating & speed skating	
51	SUI	Switzerland	1896	Internationaler Schlittschuh-Club Davos	Club member	
52	SVK	Slovakia	1993	Slovak Figure Skating Association / Slovenský Krasokorčuliarsky Zväz	Figure skating	
53	SVK	Slovakia	1998	Slovak Speed Skating Union / Slovenský Rýchlokorčuliarsky Zväz	Speed skating	
54	SWE	Sweden	1946	Swedish Figure Skating Association / Svenska Konståkningsförbundet	Figure skating	
55	SWE	Sweden	1905	Swedish Skating, Sliding and Rolling Sports Federation / Svenska Skridsko-, Kälk- och Rullidrottsförbundet	Speed skating	
56	SWE	Sweden	1892	Stockholms Allmänna Skridskoklubb	Club member	Founding member
57	TUR	Turkey	1990	Turkish Ice Skating Federation	Figure skating & speed skating	
58	UKR	Ukraine	1992	Ukrainian Figure Skating Federation / Українська федерація фігурного катання на ковзанах	Figure skating	
59	UKR	Ukraine	1992	Ukrainian Speed Skating Federation / Федерація ковзанярського спорту України	Speed skating	

== Four continents members (43 national members) ==
The remainder of this section are complete lists ordered by IOC country codes.

=== Africa (4 national members) ===
#	IOC Code	Nation	Admitted	Federation	Membership	Note
1	EGY	Egypt	2022	Ice Skate Egypt	Figure skating	
2	MAR	Morocco	2011	Association of Moroccan Ice Sports	Figure skating	
3	RSA	South Africa	1938	South African Figure Skating Association	Figure skating	
4	RSA	South Africa	1938	South African Speed Skating Association	Speed skating	

=== Americas (12 national members) ===
#	IOC Code	Nation	Admitted	Federation	Membership	Note
1	ARG	Argentina	2004	Federacion Argentina De Patinaje Sobre Hielo	Figure skating	
2	ARG	Argentina	2006	Argentine Ice Speed Skaters Union / Union Argentina de Patinadores	Speed skating	
3	BRA	Brazil	2002	Brazilian Ice Sports Federation / Confederacao Brasileira De Desportos No Gelo	Figure skating & speed skating	
4	CAN	Canada	1947	Skate Canada / Patinage Canada	Figure skating	
5	CAN	Canada	1894	Speed Skating Canada / Patinage de Vitesse Canada	Speed skating	
6	CHI	Chile	2019	Chilean National Figure Skating Federation	Figure skating	Provisional member
7	COL	Colombia	2015	Colombia Federation of Skating Sports / Federación Colombiana de Patinaje	Speed skating	Provisional member
8	ECU	Ecuador	2021	Ecuadorian Skating Federation / Federacion Ecuatoriana de Patinaje	Figure skating	
9	MEX	Mexico	1987	Mexican Skating Federation / Federacion Mexicana de Patinaje Sobre Hielo y Deportes de Invierno	Figure skating	
10	PER	Peru	2019	Peruvian Ice Skating Federation	Figure Skating	
11	USA	United States	1923	U.S. Figure Skating	Figure skating	
12	USA	United States	1965	U.S. Speedskating	Speed skating	

=== Asia (23 national members) ===
#	IOC Code	Nation	Admitted	Federation	Membership	Note
1	CHN	China	1956	Chinese Figure Skating Association / 中国花样滑冰协会	Figure skating	
2	CHN	China	1956	Chinese Skating Association / 中国滑冰协会	Speed skating	
3	HKG	Hong Kong	1983	Hong Kong China Skating Union / 香港滑冰聯盟	Figure skating & speed skating	
4	INA	Indonesia	2013	Federasi Ice Skating Indonesia	Figure skating & speed skating	
5	IND	India	2003	Ice Skating Association of India	Figure skating & speed skating	
6	JPN	Japan	1926	Japan Skating Federation / 日本スケート連盟	Figure skating & speed skating	
7	KAZ	Kazakhstan	1992	Kazakhstan Figure Skating Union	Figure skating	
8	KAZ	Kazakhstan	1992	Kazakhstan Skating Union	Speed skating	
9	KGZ	Kyrgyzstan	2014	Skating Federation of the Kyrgyz Republic / Каток Городской	Figure skating	
10	KOR	South Korea	1948	Korea Skating Union / 대한빙상경기연맹	Figure skating & speed skating	
11	KWT	Kuwait	2022	Kuwait Figure Skating Federation	Figure skating	
12	MAS	Malaysia	2009	Ice Skating Association of Malaysia	Figure skating & speed skating	
13	MGL	Mongolia	1960	Skating Union of Mongolia	Figure skating & speed skating	
14	PHI	Philippines	2004	Philippine Skating Union	Figure skating & speed skating	
15	PRK	DPR Korea	1957	Skating Association of the Democratic People's Republic of Korea	Figure skating & speed skating	
16	TKM	Turkmenistan	2019	National Center of Turkmenistan for Winter Sport	Figure skating	
17	QAT	Qatar	2014	Qatar Skating Federation	Speed skating	
18	SGP	Singapore	2008	Singapore Ice Skating Association	Figure skating & speed skating	
19	THA	Thailand	1988	Figure and Speed Skating Association of Thailand	Figure skating & speed skating	
20	TPE	Chinese Taipei	1983	Chinese Taipei Skating Union / 中華民國滑冰協會	Figure skating & speed skating	
21	UAE	United Arab Emirates	2013	United Arab Emirates Winter Sports Federation	Figure skating	
22	UZB	Uzbekistan	1992	Winter Sports Association of Uzbekistan	Figure skating & speed skating	
23	VIE	Vietnam	2019	Skating Federation of Vietnam / Liên đoàn Trượt băng Việt Nam	Figure skating & Speed Skating	

=== Oceania (4 national members) ===
#	IOC Code	Nation	Admitted	Federation	Membership	Note
1	AUS	Australia	1932	Ice Skating Australia	Figure skating	
2	AUS	Australia	1957	Australian Ice Racing	Speed skating	
3	NZL	New Zealand	1964	New Zealand Ice Figure Skating Association	Figure skating	
4	NZL	New Zealand	1983	Ice Speed Skating New Zealand	Speed skating	

== See also ==
- International Skating Union
- International figure skating
- Speed skating
