= Ice hockey in Africa =

There are a number of indoor ice rinks in African countries that are used for ice hockey. Enthusiasts have formed national teams in several countries and an inaugural African Nations Cup of Ice Hockey was planned for 2009. The first African Nations Cup of Ice Hockey was planned for South Africa between 19–26 September 2009. The matches of the championship were to be played at the ice rink of "Festival Shopping Centre" in Kempton Park. The competing countries were to be South Africa, Morocco and Algeria. However, the tournament was postponed due to lack of response from the invited countries and never played.

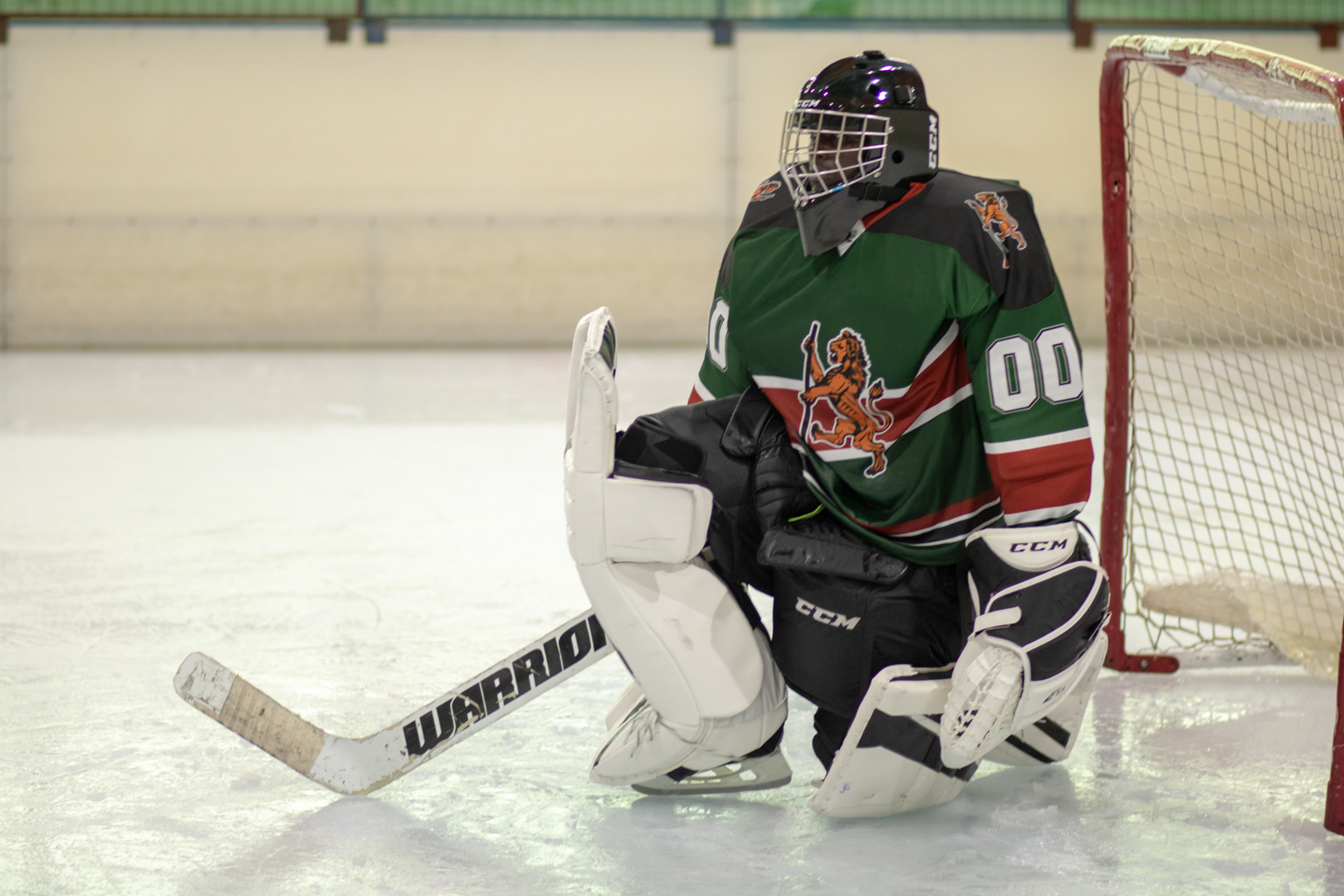

In 2014, the Egyptian players of Anubis Ice Hockey Team, Egypt's first ice hockey team started to initiate with the Royal Moroccan Ice Hockey Federation the first African Cup. In 2016 the first African Ice Hockey Clubs Cup was held in Rabat, Morocco between 24 and 31 July. The championship was contested between 6 teams from Egypt, Morocco, Tunisia and Algeria. Teams of Kenya, Libya and South Africa were also invited but they didn't participate. The cup was won by the Tunisian team.

== Southern Africa ==
=== South Africa ===
In South Africa, the sport is governed by the South African Ice Hockey Association. The South Africa national ice hockey team has been a member of the International Ice Hockey Federation (IIHF) since 1937 and are arguably the leading Ice Hockey nation on the continent with various of its players also playing college ice hockey in the USA. South Africa made its international debut in a 12–3 loss to Yugoslavia in Group C of the 1961 World Ice Hockey Championships. South African Super League teams include the Johannesburg Wildcats, Pretoria Capitals and the Cape Town Kings.

== North Africa ==
Harond Litim, Algeria

=== Algeria ===
Algeria became Associate members of the IIHF on September 26, 2019. There is currently one ice rink in Algeria. Ice hockey in Algeria is governed by Hockey Algeria. Algeria currently has one hockey club, HC Alger Corsaires in Algiers and a hockey school in Setif.

=== Egypt ===
Egypt has 11 ice rinks in 6 cities in six different governorates.

=== Morocco ===
The North western African country of Morocco has a number of ice hockey clubs like the Capitals, Ifis and Falcons who use a rink in a shopping mall in Rabat. Ice hockey is governed in Morocco by the Royal Moroccan Ice Hockey Federation which is so far an associate member of the IIHF since 2010. The Morocco national ice hockey team represented their country in the 2008 Arab Cup of Ice Hockey, in Dubai.

=== Tunisia ===
Tunisia's first ice rink is at the Blue Ice complex in the Yasmine Hammamet resort. Tunisia national ice hockey team is being formed by the ice hockey player Ihab Ayed from France, and it is governed by the Tunisian Ice Hockey Association The Tunisian team 'Carthage Eagles' is the first champion of Africa.

== East Africa ==
=== Kenya ===
In 2005, the Solar Ice Rink was opened in the Panari Hotel in Nairobi, Kenya. Several Kenyan schools have shown interest in setting up ice hockey teams. Ice hockey players from Djibouti are known to participate in some ice hockey matches in other African countries.
