= Portugal men's national hockey team =

Portugal men's national hockey team may refer to:

- Portugal men's national field hockey team
- Portugal men's national ice hockey team
- Portugal national roller hockey team
