= 2008 Arab Cup of Ice Hockey =

Tournament details
- Host country: United Arab Emirates
- Venue: 1 (in 1 host city)
- Dates: 16–20 June 2008
- Teams: 4

Final positions
- Champions: United Arab Emirates (1st title)
- Runners-up: Kuwait
- Third place: Morocco

Tournament statistics
- Games played: 10
- Goals scored: 96 (9.6 per game)

The 2008 Arab Cup of Ice Hockey (Arabic: كأس العرب لهوكي الجليد 2008) was the inaugural edition of the Arab Cup of Ice Hockey held by the Arab Ice Hockey Federation. The tournament was held in the United Arab Emirates from 16 to 20 June 2008, and was featured four teams from Arab nations. The United Arab Emirates went undefeated and won its first Arab Cup after defeating Kuwait 4–1 in the final, while Morocco won the bronze medal after a 7–5 victory over Algeria.

== Standings ==
| Rk | Team | GP | W | OTL | L | GF | GA | GD | Pts |
|---|---|---|---|---|---|---|---|---|---|
| 1 | United Arab Emirates | 3 | 3 | 0 | 0 | 19 | 5 | 14 | 6 |
| 2 | Kuwait | 3 | 2 | 1 | 0 | 17 | 9 | 8 | 5 |
| 3 | Morocco | 3 | 1 | 0 | 2 | 12 | 21 | –9 | 2 |
| 4 | Algeria | 3 | 0 | 0 | 3 | 10 | 23 | –13 | 0 |

== Fixtures ==
| 16 June 2008 | United Arab Emirates | 9–0 | Morocco | Zayed Sports City Ice Rink, Abu Dhabi |

Game reference

| 16 June 2008 | Kuwait | 8–2 | Algeria | Zayed Sports City Ice Rink, Abu Dhabi |

Game reference

| 17 June 2008 | United Arab Emirates | 6–2 | Algeria | Zayed Sports City Ice Rink, Abu Dhabi |

Game reference

| 17 June 2008 | Kuwait | 6–3 | Morocco | Zayed Sports City Ice Rink, Abu Dhabi |

Game reference

| 18 June 2008 | United Arab Emirates | 3–2 (OT) | Kuwait | Zayed Sports City Ice Rink, Abu Dhabi |

Game reference

| 18 June 2008 | Morocco | 9–6 | Algeria | Zayed Sports City Ice Rink, Abu Dhabi |

Game reference

=== Semifinals ===
| 19 June 2008 | United Arab Emirates | 10–4 | Algeria | Zayed Sports City Ice Rink, Abu Dhabi |

Game reference

| 19 June 2008 | Kuwait | 9–0 | Morocco | Zayed Sports City Ice Rink, Abu Dhabi |

Game reference

=== Bronze medal game ===
| 20 June 2008 | Morocco | 7–5 | Algeria | Zayed Sports City Ice Rink, Abu Dhabi |

Game reference

=== Gold medal game ===
| 20 June 2008 | United Arab Emirates | 4–1 | Kuwait | Zayed Sports City Ice Rink, Abu Dhabi |

Game reference

== Final standings ==
2008 Arab Cup of Ice Hockey

United Arab Emirates
1st title

| Rk | Team |
|---|---|
| 1st place, gold medalist(s) | United Arab Emirates |
| 2nd place, silver medalist(s) | Kuwait |
| 3rd place, bronze medalist(s) | Morocco |
| 4 | Algeria |
