= Algeria men's national ice hockey team =

Algeria
- Association: Hockey Algeria
- Head coach: Harond Litim
- Captain: Harond Litim
- Most games: Several Players (5)
- Top scorer: Hakim Boukhaloua (5)
- Most points: Harond Litim (11)
- Team colors
- IIHF code: ALG

First international
- Kuwait 8–2 Algeria (Abu Dhabi, UAE; 16 June 2008)

Biggest win
- Algeria 14–5 Andorra (Füssen, Germany; 4 May 2022)

Biggest defeat
- Colombia 11–1 Algeria (Füssen, Germany; 7 May 2022)

IIHF Development Cup
- Appearances: 1 (first in 2022)
- Best result: 4th (2022)

African Ice Hockey Cup
- Appearances: 1 (first in 2016)
- Best result: 3rd (2016)

Arab Cup of Ice Hockey
- Appearances: 1 (first in 2008)
- Best result: 4th (2008)

International record (W–L–T)
- 3–10–0

Medal record

African Cup
| Bronze medal – third place | 2016 Rabat | |

The Algerian national ice hockey team (Arabic: منتخب الجزائر لهوكي الجليد) is the national men's ice hockey team of Algeria.

== History ==
Formed in 2008, Algeria became a member of the IIHF on September 26, 2019. The national team was formed with the increasing number of Algerians who are playing ice hockey around the world. In June 2008, Algeria took part in the inaugural Arab Cup in Abu Dhabi, also involving the national teams of Kuwait, Morocco, and the host nation, the UAE. Algeria finished last, with Algerian forward, Harond Litim winning the MVP of the tournament award.

== Tournament record ==
=== Olympic Games ===
| Games | GP | W | L | T | GF | GA | Coach | Captain | Finish |
|---|---|---|---|---|---|---|---|---|---|
| 1920 through 2026 | Did not participate | | | | | | | | |
| (France) 2030 French Alps | To be determined | | | | | | | | |

=== World Championship ===
| Year | Location | Coach | Captain | Result |
|---|---|---|---|---|
| 1930 through 2026 | | Did not participate | | |
| 2027 | TBD | To be determined | | |

=== Development Cup ===
| Year | Location | GP | W | L | T | GF | GA | Coach | Captain | Finish |
|---|---|---|---|---|---|---|---|---|---|---|
| 2017 | (Andorra) Canillo | Did not participate | | | | | | | | |
| 2018 | (Germany) Füssen | Did not participate | | | | | | | | |
| 2022 | (Germany) Füssen | 5 | 2 | 0 | 3 | 32 | 35 | Harond Litim | | 4th |
| 2023 | (Slovakia) Bratislava | Did not participate | | | | | | | | |
| 2024 | (Slovakia) Bratislava | Did not participate | | | | | | | | |
| 2025 | (Andorra) Canillo | Did not participate | | | | | | | | |

=== Arab Cup ===
| Year | Location | GP | W | L | T | GF | GA | Coach | Captain | Finish |
|---|---|---|---|---|---|---|---|---|---|---|
| 2008 | (United Arab Emirates) Abu Dhabi | 3 | 0 | 0 | 3 | 10 | 23 | Ali Khaldi | Harond Litim | 4th |
| 2009 | Kuwait City | Canceled | | | | | | | | |
| 2023 | Kuwait City | 5 | 2 | 1 | 2 | 27 | 26 | Harond Litim | | 5th |

== Team ==
=== Current roster ===
Arab Cup rosters

=== 2008 Arab Cup Roster ===
| # | Player | Club |
Goaltenders
| 1 | Waseem Ghurani | (Canada) |
| 55 | Farid Choubane | (France) |
Defencemen
| 15 | Sid-Ahmed Bouslama | (France) Montpellier |
| 28 | Djemal Zitouni | (France) Epinal |
| 91 | Nassim Boulakdem | (France) Cergy |
| | Said Sebaa | (France) Neuilly Sur Marne |
Forwards
| 6 | Harond Litim | (France) Viry |
| 11 | Mohamed Belarbi | (Canada) |
| 20 | Yassine Fahas | (France) Ducs de Dijon |
| 22 | Karim Kerbouche | (United Kingdom) |
| 41 | Mohamed Benyahia | (France) Évry |
| 66 | Fawzi Kerdougli | (Canada) |
| 73 | Hakim Boukhaloua | (France) Évry |
| 84 | Nordine Mahdidi | (France) Rouen 2 |

=== 2009 Arab Cup Roster ===
| # | Player | Club |
Goaltenders
| 1 | Khalid Abdulwahid | (United Kingdom) Streatham Redskins |
| 21 | Didier Drif | (France) |
Defencemen
| 15 | Sid-Ahmed Bouslama | (France) Montpellier |
| 91 | Nassim Boulakdem | (France) Cergy |
| | Jordi Abbas | (France) |
| | Akim Bouchabane | (France) |
| | Said Sebaa | (France) Neuilly Sur Marne |
| | Junaid Zouaoui | (France) Neuilly Sur Marne |
Forwards
| 6 | Harond Litim | (France) Paris Volants |
| 11 | Mohamed Belarbi | (Canada) |
| 20 | Yassine Fahas | (France) Ducs de Dijon |
| 22 | Karim Kerbouche | (United Kingdom) Lee Valley Lions |
| 41 | Mohamed Benyahia | (France) Évry |
| 73 | Hakim Boukhaloua | (France) Évry |
| | Bachir Aghroud | (France) |
| | Karim Chaiblaine | (France) |
| | Mourad Chaiblaine | (France) |
| | Ali Chenini | (France) |
| | Felix Chougui | (Sweden) Viry |
| | Ali Khaldi | (Sweden) |

== Staff & Management ==
- (Algeria) Karim Kerbouche
- (Algeria) Ali Khaldi
- (Algeria) Harond Litim
- (Algeria) Nassim Boulakdem

== All-time record against other nations ==
Last match update: 25 August 2024

| Team | GP | W | T | L | GF | GA |
|---|---|---|---|---|---|---|
| Andorra | 1 | 1 | 0 | 0 | 14 | 5 |
| Bahrain | 1 | 0 | 0 | 1 | 5 | 6 |
| Chile | 1 | 1 | 0 | 0 | 8 | 1 |
| Colombia | 1 | 0 | 0 | 1 | 1 | 11 |
| Egypt | 3 | 2 | 1 | 0 | 20 | 10 |
| Ireland | 1 | 0 | 0 | 1 | 5 | 6 |
| Kuwait | 2 | 0 | 0 | 2 | 4 | 14 |
| Lebanon | 1 | 0 | 0 | 1 | 3 | 10 |
| Liechtenstein | 1 | 0 | 0 | 1 | 2 | 11 |
| Morocco | 4 | 1 | 0 | 3 | 15 | 26 |
| Portugal | 1 | 1 | 0 | 0 | 9 | 1 |
| Tunisia | 2 | 1 | 0 | 1 | 12 | 11 |
| United Arab Emirates | 2 | 0 | 0 | 2 | 6 | 16 |
| Venezuela | 1 | 1 | 0 | 0 | 8 | 2 |
| Total | 22 | 8 | 1 | 13 | 113 | 131 |

== See also ==
- Ice hockey in Africa
- Morocco national ice hockey team
- Namibia national inline hockey team
- South Africa men's national ice hockey team
- Tunisia national ice hockey team
