= Tunisia men's national ice hockey team =

Tunisia
- The flag of Tunisia is the badge used on the players jerseys.
- Nickname: نسور قرطاج (Eagles of Carthage)
- Association: Association Tunisienne de Hockey sur Glace
- Head coach: Ihab Ayed
- Team colors
- IIHF code: TUN

Ranking
- Current IIHF: NR (3 June 2026)

First international
- Kuwait 11–4 Tunisia (Kuwait City, Kuwait; 7 May 2023)

Biggest defeat
- Kuwait 11–4 Tunisia (Kuwait City, Kuwait; 7 May 2023)

Arab Cup
- Appearances: 1 (first in 2023)
- Best result: 6th (2023)

International record (W–L–T)
- 0–4–0

The Tunisia national ice hockey team (Arabic: منتخب تونس لهوكي الجليد, French: Équipe de Tunisie de hockey sur glace) is the national men's ice hockey team of Tunisia. The team is controlled by the Tunisian Ice Hockey Association and has been an associate member of the International Ice Hockey Federation (IIHF) since 22 September 2021. Tunisia is currently not ranked in the IIHF World Ranking and has not entered in any IIHF World Championship events.

== History ==
The Tunisian Ice Hockey Association was founded in 2009. On 14 June 2014, the national team played its first unofficial game against a French club team, Coqs de Courbevoie, in Courbevoie, France. They were defeated by the Coqs 6–5. On 22 September 2021, Tunisia became an official member of the IIHF.

After a long period of inactivity, Tunisia played its first international tournament at the 2023 Arab Cup in Kuwait.

== Tournament record ==
=== World Championships ===
Year	Host	Result	Pld	W	OTW	OTL	L
1930 through 2021		Not an IIHF member					
2022 through 2027		did not enter					
Total		0/0	–	–	–	–	–

=== Arab Cup ===
Year	Host	Result	Pld	W	OTW	OTL	L
2023	Kuwait City	6th	5	2	0	0	3
Total		1/1	4	2	0	0	2

== All-time record against other national teams ==
Last match update: 13 May 2023

Key
Positive balance (more Wins)
Neutral balance (Wins = Losses)
Negative balance (more Losses)

Team	GP	W	T	L	GF	GA
Algeria	2	0	0	2	8	15
Bahrain	1	0	0	1	2	7
Kuwait	1	0	0	1	4	11
Total	4	0	0	4	14	33

== All-time record against clubs and B teams ==
Last match update: 11 May 2023

Team	GP	W	T	L	GF	GA
(France) Coqs de Courbevoie	1	0	0	1	5	6
(Saudi Arabia) Jeddah Eagles	1	1	0	0	24	3
Total	2	1	0	1	29	9

== See also ==
- Ice hockey in Africa
- Algeria men's national ice hockey team
- Morocco men's national ice hockey team
- South Africa men's national ice hockey team
