= Vaughan Stars =

- City: Vaughan, Ontario, Canada
- League: Greater Metro Junior A Hockey League
- Operated: 2011
- Home arena: Vaughan Sports Village
- Colours: Red, Silver, and White
- General manager: Andrej Kluka
- Head coach: Jim Aldred

The Vaughan Stars were a Junior ice hockey team based in Vaughan, Ontario, Canada. They played in the Greater Metro Junior A Hockey League.

== History ==
The Stars were announced after the Spring Draft in May 2011. The Stars were a new team in Vaughan, after the Vaughan Wild moved and became the Lefroy Wave. Jim Aldred became head coach of the Stars, who played home games at Canlan Ice Sports at York University.

On September 10, 2011, the Stars played their first game. The game was on the road against the Toronto Canada Moose, in Thornhill, Ontario, and the Stars won 4-2.

The Stars began the season with an outstanding 11-4-1 record, good enough for sixth place in the league. Every season the GMHL holds a prospects tournament in Elliot Lake that is mandatory for the top seven teams in the league, in 2011 from November 22 until 24. On November 21, the Stars informed the league that they were refusing to travel to the tournament at the last moment. The league warned the Stars of disciplinary action. The Stars defaulted their November 25 game against the Lefroy Wave and November 26 game against the Bradford Rattlers.

The GMHL revoked the team's membership on November 28, ending the season.

== Season-by-Season Standings ==
Season	GP	W	L	T	OTL	GF	GA	P	Results	Playoffs
2011-12	16	11	4	-	1	76	59	23	11th GMHL	Franchise Revoked
