= Luxembourg women's national ice hockey team =

National men's ice hockey team of Luxembourg

Luxembourg
- Association: Fédération Luxembourgeoise de Hockey sur Glace
- Most games: Several players (5)
- Top scorer: Bailey Habscheid (11)
- Most points: Bailey Habscheid (16)
- Team colors
- IIHF code: LUX

First international
- Luxembourg 5–4 Ireland (Kuwait City, Kuwait; 6 November 2022)

Biggest win
- Luxembourg 11–0 Andorra (Kuwait City, Kuwait; 10 November 2022)

Biggest defeat
- Colombia 4–0 Luxembourg (Kuwait City, Kuwait; 12 November 2022)

International record (W–L–T)
- 3–2–0

The Luxembourg women's national ice hockey team is the national women's ice hockey team of Luxembourg. It is controlled by the Luxembourg Ice Hockey Federation and a member of the International Ice Hockey Federation. The participated in its first international event at the 2022 IIHF Women's Development Cup held in Kuwait City, winning the bronze medal.

== International competitions ==
=== IIHF Women's Development Cup ===
Year	Host	Result	Pld	W	T	L
2022	Kuwait City	4th place	5	3	0	2
Total		1/1	5	3	0	2
