= Gary Gresdal =

Canadian ice hockey player (1947–2022)

- Born: January 15, 1947 Kingston, Ontario, Canada
- Died: March 13, 2022 (aged 75) Sudbury, Ontario, Canada
- Height: 183 cm (6 ft 0 in)
- Weight: 88 kg (194 lb; 13 st 12 lb)
- Position: Centre
- Shot: Left
- Played for: Quebec Nordiques
- Playing career: 1965–1976

Gary Edward Gresdal (January 15, 1947 – March 13, 2022) was a Canadian professional ice hockey centre. He played two regular-season World Hockey Association games and one playoff game with the Quebec Nordiques in the 1975–76 season, recording one assist and five penalty minutes in the regular season and 14 penalty minutes in the playoffs. Gresdal died on March 13, 2022, at the age of 75.

== Career statistics ==
=== Regular season and playoffs ===
			Regular season					Playoffs
Season	Team	League	GP	G	A	Pts	PIM	GP	G	A	Pts	PIM
1963–64	Regina Pats	SJHL	62	24	54	78	186	—	—	—	—	—
1965–66	Des Moines Oak Leafs	IHL	57	14	21	35	131	—	—	—	—	—
1967–68	Des Moines Oak Leafs	IHL	3	0	0	0	0	—	—	—	—	—
1967–68	Belleville Mohawks	OHASr	Statistics Unavailable
1969–70	Jersey Devils	EHL	65	20	27	47	170	—	—	—	—	—
1970–71	Jersey Devils	EHL	71	17	42	59	192	—	—	—	—	—
1971–72	Jersey Devils	EHL	75	13	33	46	392	—	—	—	—	—
1972–73	Syracuse Blazers	EHL	52	5	34	39	256	14	3	9	12	52
1973–74	Albuquerque Six–Guns	CHL	22	2	9	11	52	—	—	—	—	—
1973–74	Denver Spurs	WHL	51	5	10	15	130	—	—	—	—	—
1974–75	Syracuse Eagles	AHL	69	2	9	11	162	1	0	0	0	2
1975–76	Quebec Nordiques	WHA	2	0	1	1	5	1	0	0	0	14
1975–76	Maine Nordiques	NAHL	42	2	5	7	147	4	0	1	1	28
WHA totals			2	0	1	1	5	1	0	0	0	14
