= 1987–88 Eredivisie (ice hockey) season =

Dutch ice hockey season

The 1987–88 Eredivisie season was the 28th season of the Eredivisie, the top level of ice hockey in the Netherlands. Six teams participated in the league, and the Nijmegen Tigers won the championship.

== Regular season ==
| | Club | GP | W | T | L | GF | GA | Pts (Bonus) |
|---|---|---|---|---|---|---|---|---|
| 1. | Nijmegen Tigers | 10 | 6 | 1 | 3 | 52 | 36 | 18(5) |
| 2. | Heerenveen Flyers | 10 | 5 | 2 | 3 | 49 | 36 | 18(6) |
| 3. | Eaters Geleen | 10 | 5 | 1 | 4 | 43 | 47 | 14(3) |
| 4. | Rotterdam Panda’s | 10 | 4 | 1 | 5 | 45 | 51 | 13(4) |
| 5. | Tilburg Trappers | 10 | 5 | 1 | 4 | 61 | 49 | 13(2) |
| 6. | Amstel Tijgers Amsterdam | 10 | 1 | 2 | 7 | 47 | 78 | 5(1) |

== Playoffs ==
Semi-finals
Nijmegen Tigers | 3
Rotterdam Panda’s | 2
Heerenveen Flyers | 3
Eaters Geleen | 1

Final
Nijmegen Tigers | 3
Heerenveen Flyers | 1
Third place
not held
