= Namibia national inline hockey team =

The Namibia national inline hockey team is the national men's inline hockey team of Namibia.

The sport of inline hockey was introduced to Namibia in 1995, and the Namibia Ice and InLine Hockey Association (NIIHA) was organized to promote inline hockey, with the potential of competition in ice hockey. Although Namibia has not yet been represented in ice hockey competition, the NIIHA has, since 2005, sponsored national teams to represent Namibia internationally in inline hockey. The national team participated in the 2005 tournament in Kuopio, Finland, where it was awarded the Fair Play Trophy, the 2006 tournament in Budapest, Hungary, and the 2007 tournament in Passau, Germany. In 2008, two 18 and under teams played in the FIRS Junior world championship, and the FIRS Ladies World championship, and a 14-years old and under team participated in AAU competition in the United States in Philadelphia.

The NIIHA has been a member of the International Ice Hockey Federation since 31 May 1998, but is not currently ranked in the IIHF World Ranking and is not actively competing in any IIHF World Championship events.

== See also ==
- Ice hockey in Africa
