= Macedonian Ice Hockey Federation =

Governing body of ice hockey in Macedonia

Macedonia
- Association name: Macedonian Ice Hockey Federation
- IIHF Code: MKD
- IIHF membership: 4 October 2001
- President: Nikola Tasev

The Macedonian Ice Hockey Federation (Macedonian: Хокеј Федерација на Македонија; Hokej Federacija na Makedonija) is the governing body of ice hockey in North Macedonia.
