= Hockey Algeria =

Ice hockey and inline hockey governing body of Algeria

Algeria
- Association name: Hockey Algeria
- IIHF Code: ALG
- IIHF membership: 26 September 2019
- President: Karim Kerbouche

Hockey Algeria is the public name of the authority which governs both ice hockey, inline hockey and ball hockey in Algeria.

Hockey Algeria was founded in 2008 by Karim Kerbouche, Harond Litim and Nassim Boulakdem and was later accepted into the International Ice Hockey Federation (IIHF) on 26 September 2019. The goal was to unite hockey players of Algerian origin from around the world, and create an Algerian national team. Hockey Algeria is an associate member of the IIHF and therefore has no right to vote in the General Assembly. The current president of Hockey Algeria is Karim Kerbouche.

== Ice hockey in Algeria ==
There is currently little ice hockey activity in Algeria. There is currently one club in Algeria, HC Alger Corsaires. There is one real ice rink in Algeria and several synthetic ice rinks, with various levels of activity within them.
