= Royal Moroccan Ice Hockey Federation =

Morocco
- Association name: Fédération Royale Marocaine de Hockey sur Glace
- IIHF Code: MAR
- IIHF membership: May 22, 2010
- President: Khalid Mrini

The Royal Moroccan Ice Hockey Federation (Arabic: الجامعة الملكية المغربية لهوكي الجليد; French: Fédération Royale Marocaine de Hockey sur Glace (FRMHG)) is the governing body of ice hockey in Morocco.

== See also ==
- Morocco national ice hockey team
