= IIHF Development Cup =

Annual international ice hockey tournament

- Sport: Ice hockey
- Founded: 2017
- Most recent champions: Men's – Puerto Rico (1st title); Women's – Colombia (2nd title)

The IIHF Development Cup is an annual international ice hockey tournament sanctioned by the International Ice Hockey Federation (IIHF). It is designed for national teams that do not compete in the IIHF World Championships. Since countries are required to have an Olympic-size ice rink and a domestic league to play in the World Championships, the Development Cup is the highest-level international tournament available to IIHF members without a league or Olympic-sized rink.

The first edition was held in Canillo, Andorra in 2017 with Morocco winning the title. In 2022, the first Women's Development Cup was held in Kuwait City, Kuwait and was won by Colombia.

== Men's ==
=== Results ===
Year	(gold) Gold	(silver) Silver	(bronze) Bronze	Host city	Host country
2017	Morocco (1)	Ireland (1)	Portugal (1)	Canillo	Andorra
2018	North Macedonia (1)	Portugal (1)	Ireland (1)	Füssen	Germany
2019	Tournament cancelled due to the COVID-19 pandemic				
2020	Tournament cancelled due to the COVID-19 pandemic				
2022	Colombia (1)	Liechtenstein (1)	Ireland (2)	Füssen	Germany
2023	Liechtenstein (1)	Argentina (1)	Colombia (1)	Bratislava	Slovakia
2024	Ireland (1)	Portugal (2)	Colombia (2)	Bratislava	Slovakia
2025	Puerto Rico (1)	Liechtenstein (2)	Portugal (2)	Canillo	Andorra

=== Medal table ===
Rank	Country	(gold) Gold	(silver) Silver	(bronze) Bronze	Total
1	Liechtenstein	1	2	0	3
2	Ireland	1	1	2	4
3	Colombia	1	0	2	3
4	Morocco	1	0	0	1
4	North Macedonia	1	0	0	1
4	Puerto Rico	1	0	0	1
7	Portugal	0	2	2	4
8	Argentina	0	1	0	1
Totals (8 countries)		6	6	6	18

=== Participating nations ===
Portugal has participated in each Development Cup since 2017, coached by Jim Aldred.

Nation	(Andorra) 2017	(Germany) 2018	(Germany) 2022	(Slovakia) 2023	(Slovakia) 2024	(Andorra) 2025	(Morocco) 2026	Total
Algeria	–	–	4	–	–	–	–	1
Andorra	4	4	5	–	–	6	TBA	4
Argentina	–	–	–	2	4	–	TBA	2
Brazil	–	–	–	–	6	5	TBA	2
Colombia	–	–	1	3	3	–	TBA	3
Greece	–	–	–	–	5	4	TBA	2
India	–	–	–	–	–	–	Q	1
Ireland	2	3	3	4	1	–	TBA	5
Liechtenstein	–	–	2	1	–	2	TBA	3
Morocco	1	–	–	–	–	–	Q	2
North Macedonia	–	1	–	–	–	–	TBA	1
Portugal	3	2	6	5	2	3	TBA	6
Puerto Rico	–	–	–	–	–	1	TBA	1

== Women's ==
=== Results ===
Year	(gold) Gold	(silver) Silver	(bronze) Bronze	Host city	Host country
2022	Colombia (1)	Kuwait (1)	Luxembourg (1)	Kuwait City	Kuwait
2023	Colombia (2)	Argentina (1)	Iran (1)	Krynica-Zdrój	Poland

=== Medal table ===
Rank	Country	(gold) Gold	(silver) Silver	(bronze) Bronze	Total
1	Colombia	2	0	0	2
2	Kuwait	0	1	0	1
3	Argentina	0	1	0	1
4	Luxembourg	0	0	1	1
5	Iran	0	0	1	1
Totals (5 countries)		2	2	2	6

=== Participating nations ===
Nation	(Kuwait) 2022	(Poland) 2023	Total
Andorra	6	-	1
Argentina	-	2	1
Colombia	1	1	2
Iran	-	3	1
Ireland	5	4	2
Kuwait	3	-	1
Luxembourg	2	-	1
United Arab Emirates	4	-	1

== See also ==
- IIHF World Championship Division IV
- IIHF Asia Cup
