= Morocco men's national ice hockey team =

Morocco
- Association: Royal Moroccan Ice Hockey Federation
- Head coach: Adil Eli Farj & Mimoun Mrini
- Most games: Mehdi Ghazi (11)
- Most points: Samir Bouchaoui (22)
- Team colors
- IIHF code: MAR

Ranking
- Current IIHF: NR (3 June 2026)

First international
- United Arab Emirates 9–0 Morocco (Abu Dhabi, United Arab Emirates; 16 June 2008)

Biggest win
- Morocco 11–2 Portugal (Canillo, Andorra; 30 September 2017)

Biggest defeat
- United Arab Emirates 9–0 Morocco (Abu Dhabi, United Arab Emirates; 16 June 2008); Kuwait 9–0 Morocco (Abu Dhabi, United Arab Emirates; 19 June 2008)

Arab Cup of Ice Hockey
- Appearances: 1 (first in 2008)
- Best result: 3rd (2008)

Development Cup
- Appearances: 1 (first in 2017)
- Best result: 1st (2017)

International record (W–L–T)
- 8–6–0

The Moroccan national ice hockey team (Arabic: منتخب المغرب لهوكي الجليد) is the men's national ice hockey team of Morocco. The team is controlled by the Royal Moroccan Ice Hockey Federation and has been an associate member of the International Ice Hockey Federation (IIHF). The team's home rink is in the Moroccan capital, Rabat.

== History ==
In June 2008, Morocco took part in the inaugural Arab Cup in Abu Dhabi, also involving the national teams of Algeria, the UAE and Kuwait. Morocco's first game was a 9-0 loss to the UAE on 16 June 2008. The first ever goal to be scored by a Moroccan player was scored by Yassin Ahrazem against Kuwait during the first ever 2008 Arab Cup. On 22 May 2010, the IIHF announced that Morocco is now an associate member.

== Tournament record ==
=== World Championship ===
Year	Host	Result	Pld	W	OTW	OTL	L
1930 through 2026		Did not enter					
2027	(Malaysia) Kuala Lumpur	(Division IV)					
Total							

=== Development Cup ===
Year	Host	Result	Pld	W	OW	OL	L
2017	(Andorra) Canillo	1st place	4	4	0	0	0

=== Arab Cup ===
Year	Host	Result	Pld	W	OW	OL	L
2008	(United Arab Emirates) Abu Dhabi	3rd place	5	2	0	0	3

== 2017 team roster ==
#	Player	Club
President
	Khalid Mrini	(Morocco)
Coach
	Adil Eli Farj & Mimoun Mrini	(Canada)
Goaltenders
33	Idriss Bouhmouch	(Canada)
39	Hakim N'Bigui	(Canada)
Defencemen
12	Hakim Bouchama	(Canada)
6	Hakim Bouchaoui	(Sweden)
44	Aziz Bouhdid	(Canada)
53	Karim Gilbert	(Canada)
2	Youssef Kabbaj (C)	(Canada)
Forwards
23	Yassin Ahrazem	(United Kingdom)
24	Charles-Hichem Balha (A)	(Canada)
11	Redouan Bouhdid (A)	(Canada)
22	Othmane Boukouiss	(Canada)
20	Damien Bourguignon	(France)
9	Youssef Chadli	(Canada)
5	Moulay-Ayad Dahha	(Canada)
27	Sidi Mohamed Dahha (A)	(Canada)
10	Mohamed El Idrissi	(Canada)
71	Mehdi Ghazi	(France)
91	Salim Harchi	(Canada)

== All-time record against other nations ==
Last match update: 25 January 2026

Key
Positive balance (more Wins)
Neutral balance (Wins = Losses)
Negative balance (more Losses)

Team	GP	W	T	L	GF	GA
Algeria	4	3	0	1	26	15
Ireland	2	2	0	0	21	6
Portugal	2	2	0	0	18	5
Andorra	1	1	0	0	9	3
Egypt	1	0	0	1	2	3
Lebanon	1	0	0	1	3	5
United Arab Emirates	1	0	0	1	0	9
Kuwait	2	0	0	2	3	15
Total	14	8	0	6	82	61

== See also ==
- Ice hockey in Africa
- Algeria national ice hockey team
- Namibia national inline hockey team
- South Africa men's national ice hockey team
- Tunisia national ice hockey team
