= Ladislav Olejník =

Czech ice hockey player and coach (1932–2022)

- Born: 8 May 1932 Brno, Czechoslovakia
- Died: 9 June 2022 (aged 90) Bad Nauheim, Hesse, Germany
- Height: 185 cm (6 ft 1 in)
- Weight: 86 kg (190 lb; 13 st 8 lb)
- Position: Defenseman
- Played for: ZSJ GZ Královo Pole; Rudá hvězda Brno
- Coached for: EC Bad Tölz; EC Bad Nauheim; Mannheimer ERC; Starbulls Rosenheim; Frankfurt Lions; Wölfe Freiburg; Ratinger Löwen
- National team: Czechoslovakia
- Playing career: 1950–1967
- Coaching career: 1968–2005

Ladislav Olejník (8 May 1932 – 9 June 2022) was a Czech ice hockey player who also coached in Germany. He played for ZSJ GZ Královo Pole and Rudá hvězda Brno from 1950 to 1967 and was a coach in the Deutsche Eishockey Liga from 1968 to 2005.
