= Tunisian Ice Hockey Association =

Ice hockey governing body in Tunisia

Tunisia
- Association name: Association Tunisienne de Hockey sur Glace
- IIHF Code: TUN
- Founded: 2009
- IIHF membership: 22 September 2021
- President: Ihab Ayed

The Tunisian Ice Hockey Association (ATHG) (French: Association Tunisienne de Hockey sur Glace) is the governing body of ice hockey in Tunisia.

== History ==
The Tunisian Ice Hockey Association was founded in 2009, and was later accepted into the International Ice Hockey Federation (IIHF) on 22 September 2021. Tunisia was the fourth African nation to join the IIHF after South Africa, Morocco and Algeria. The ATHG has been an associate member of the IIHF and therefore has no right to vote in the General Assembly. The current president of the ATHG is Ihab Ayed.

== See also ==
- Tunisia national ice hockey team
