= EHC Vaduz-Schellenberg =

- Nickname: The Nobles
- City: Vaduz, Liechtenstein
- League: VEHL 2, Eishockey-Nationalliga
- Founded: 1996
- Home arena: Eisplatz Schlucher-Treff
- Colors: Yellow, Black
- General manager: Christian Fuchs
- Head coach: Marco Adank
- Website: Official website

EHC Vaduz-Schellenberg is an ice hockey team from Liechtenstein. The team currently plays in the Vorarlberg Ice Hockey League 2 in neighboring Austria. As the only adult hockey club in the country, EHC Vaduz-Schellenberg provides the majority of players for the Liechtenstein national ice hockey team.

From 2006 to 2018 the team was coached by former Czechoslovak international Miroslav Berek who also managed clubs and national teams from Austria, Switzerland, Italy, and Germany.

== Arena ==
There is no indoor ice arena in Liechtenstein. The club's home rink is the Eisplatz Schlucher-Treff in the resort town of Malbun, Triesenberg. Home league matches are played at the Eishalle Grüsch in nearby Grüsch, Switzerland.

== History ==
EHC Vaduz was founded on 2 July 1996 after a group of amateurs began meeting to play at a rink in Widnau. The following year, the club competed in an organized league for the first time, earning fourth place in the Vorarlberg Class C. HC Schellenberg was formed in 1998 as a second club in the principality. In 2001, the clubs merged to form EHC Vaduz-Schellenberg. By 2005, the club had more than thirty active members. Between 2002 and 2006, the club competed in the Swiss league system in the 4. Liga.

Since at least 2015, the club has competed in the Vorarlberg Ice Hockey League 2. EHC Vaduz-Schellenberg defeated HC Röthis 5–4 in the final to win the league title for the 2017/2018 season. Marco Zwahlen and Matthias Bühler were named the league's best goalkeeper and scorer, respectively. The victory marked the club's second championship in three seasons under head coach Miroslav Berek. Following the death of Berek, longtime player Marco Adank took over as manager of the team.

In 2025, the club was one of four teams that competed in Liechtenstein's first-ever national league. The league was played in a 3-on-3 format with rules developed with and approved by the IIHF. In the process, Liechtenstein became the first country to play its national championship in this format.

== Recent seasons ==
Key

Champion Runners-up 3rd Place

Season	League									Play-Offs	Notes
Season	League	Pos.	Pl.	W	L	GF	GA	GD	Pts	Play-Offs	Notes
2002/2003	(Switzerland) 4. Liga	5th	18	6	10	76	99	-23	14		
2003/2004	(Switzerland) 4. Liga	5th	14						11		
2004/2005	(Switzerland) 4. Liga	6th	16						13		
2005/2006	(Switzerland) 4. Liga	8th	12						5		
2007 to 2014	Unknown										
2015/16	(Austria) VEHL 2	2nd	12	7	2	44	23	21	25	Champions	
2016/17	(Austria) VEHL 2	1st	14	10	3	69	26	43	32	Finals	
2017/18	(Austria) VEHL 2	3rd	12	7	5	33	29	4	21	Champions	
2018/19	(Austria) VEHL 2	5th	13	7	5	37	64	-27	22	Quarter-finals	
2019/20	(Austria) VEHL 2	3rd	14	6	5	57	47	10	23	Finals	
2020/21	(Austria) VEHL 2	Cancelled because of COVID-19 pandemic									
2021/22	(Austria) VEHL 2	Cancelled because of COVID-19 pandemic									
2022/23	(Austria) VEHL 2	4th	10	3	4	41	36	5	14	Semi-final	
2023/24	(Austria) VEHL 2	2nd	12	7	2	55	46	9	25		

- Source(s):VEHL 2 Tabelle VEHL 2 Meistertafel Elite Prospects

== Honours ==
As of March 2024

- Vorarlberg Ice Hockey League 2

Champions: 2016/2017, 2017/2018
Runners-Up: 2011/2012, 2015/2016
