= Liechtenstein Ice Hockey Federation =

Liechtenstein
- Association name: Liechtenstein Ice Hockey Federation
- IIHF Code: LIE
- IIHF membership: October 4, 2001
- President: Martin Rudisuhli

The Liechtenstein Ice Hockey Federation (German: Liechtensteiner Eishockey und Inline Verband (LEIV)) is the governing body of ice and inline hockey in Liechtenstein.

== League ==
In 2025, the federation organized Liechtenstein's first-ever national league. The four-team field, which included EHC Vaduz-Schellenberg, was played in a 3-on-3 format with rules developed with and approved by the IIHF. In the process, Liechtenstein became the first country to play its national championship in this format.
