= Arab Cup of Ice Hockey =

International ice hockey competition for national teams in the Arab world

- Sport: Ice hockey
- Founded: 2008
- First season: 2008
- No. of teams: 8
- Region: Arab world
- Most recent champion: Lebanon (1st title)
- Most titles: Lebanon; United Arab Emirates (1 title each)

The Arab Cup of Ice Hockey (Arabic: كأس العرب لهوكي الجليد) is an international ice hockey competition involving national teams from Arab nations, and has been organized by the Arab Ice Hockey Federation, the governing body for nations in the Middle East and North Africa. The tournament's inaugural edition was held in the United Arab Emirates from 16 to 20 June 2008, which was won by the hosts United Arab Emirates. The 2009 edition was planned to be held in Kuwait, but was cancelled. The 2023 edition was held in Kuwait from 7 to 13 May 2023.

== Results ==
Year	(gold) Gold	(silver) Silver	(bronze) Bronze	4th place	Host city	Host country
2008	United Arab Emirates (1)	Kuwait (1)	Morocco (1)	Algeria (1)	Abu Dhabi	United Arab Emirates
2009	Tournament was planned to be held in Kuwait but was cancelled					
2023	Lebanon (1)	Kuwait (2)	Oman (1)	Bahrain (1)	Kuwait City	Kuwait

== Medal table ==
Rank	Nation	Gold	Silver	Bronze	Total
1	Lebanon	1	0	0	1
1	United Arab Emirates	1	0	0	1
3	Kuwait	0	2	0	2
4	Morocco	0	0	1	1
4	Oman	0	0	1	1
Totals (5 entries)		2	2	2	6

== Comprehensive team results by tournament ==
Legend

- 1st – Champions
- 2nd – Runners-up
- 3rd – Third place
- 4th – Fourth place
- × – Did not enter
- – Hosts

Team	2008 (4)	2023 (8)	Total
Algeria	4th	5th	2
Bahrain	×	4th	1
Egypt	×	7th	1
Kuwait	2nd	2nd	2
Lebanon	×	1st	1
Morocco	3rd	×	1
Oman	×	3rd	1
Saudi Arabia	×	8th	1
Tunisia	×	6th	1
United Arab Emirates	1st	×	1
Team	2008 (4)	2023 (8)	Total

== See also ==
- Gulf Ice Hockey Championship
- IIHF Asia and Oceania Championship
