= Portuguese Winter Sports Federation =

Portugal
- Association name: Portuguese Winter Sports Federation
- IIHF Code: POR
- Founded: 15 May 1992
- IIHF membership: 13 May 1999
- President: Pedro Flávio Duarte Lopes Martins

The Portuguese Winter Sports Federation (Portuguese: Federação de Desportos de Inverno de Portugal, FDI-Portugal) is the governing body of ice hockey, cross-country skiing, curling, alpine skiing, figure skating, speed skating, and snowboarding in Portugal.

== National teams ==
- Men's national team

== Ice hockey statistics ==
- 116 players total
- 48 male players
- 50 junior players
- 18 female players
- 7 referees
- 1 indoor rink
- Not ranked in the world ranking

=== Other sports ===
The federation also supports the competitive skiing and snowboarding in Portugal.
