= North Macedonia men's national ice hockey team =

North Macedonia
- Association: Macedonian Ice Hockey Federation
- General manager: Nikola Tasev
- Head coach: Gjorgi Grchev
- Home stadium: Boris Trajkovski Hockey Arena
- Team colors
- IIHF code: MKD
Home colours	Away colours

Ranking
- Current IIHF: NR (3 June 2026)

First international
- Macedonia 8–7 Bosnia and Herzegovina (Sarajevo, BIH; 20 January 2018)

Biggest win
- Macedonia 9–3 Portugal (Füssen, Germany; 21 November 2018)

Biggest defeat
- Bosnia and Herzegovina 7–6 Macedonia (Sarajevo, BIH; 21 January 2018)

Development Cup
- Appearances: 1 (first in 2018)
- Best result: 1st (2018)

International record (W–L–T)
- 6–1–0

North Macedonia's ice hockey team (Macedonian: Хокејарска репрезентација на Македонија; Hokejarska reprezentacija na Makedonija) is the national men's ice hockey team of North Macedonia. They are controlled by the Macedonian Ice Hockey Federation and has been an associate member of the International Ice Hockey Federation (IIHF) since 4 October 2001.

== History ==
Macedonia played its first unofficial game on 27 March 2011 against Red Star Sofia of Bulgaria in Skopje. They went on to lose the game 4–1. On 20 December 2014, Macedonia played two exhibition games against the Bulgarian U20 national team in Skopje. They lost the first game 6–5 in overtime and won the second game 4–3 following a shootout, recording the team's first ever win. Macedonia have still never entered in any IIHF World Championship tournaments. On 20 January 2018, Macedonia made its international debut and played two exhibition games against Bosnia and Herzegovina in Sarajevo over the weekend. They won the first game 8–7 and lost the second game 7–6 in overtime a day later.

=== Skating Rinks ===
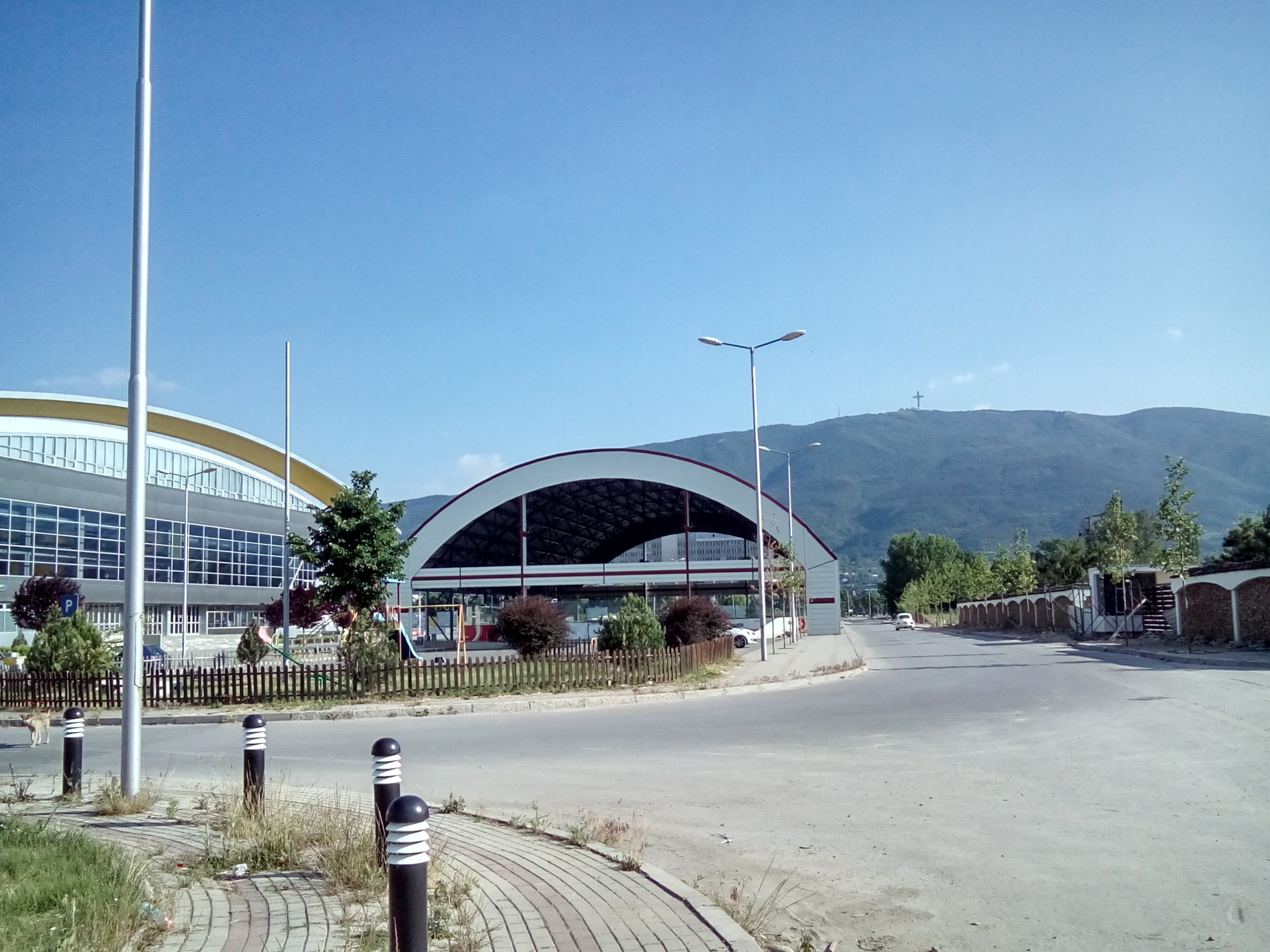
Boris Traikovski Skating Rink

== Tournament record ==
=== European Championship ===
Within (Socialist Republic of Macedonia) ,Yugoslavia federal team 1939-(11),1964-(11),1968-(7)

- (North Macedonia) after 1991 Didn't Held

=== Olympic Games ===
Within (Socialist Republic of Macedonia) ,Yugoslavia federal team 1964-(14),1968-(9),1972-(11),1976-(10),1980-p,o(3rd),1984-(11),1988-p,o(5th)

- (North Macedonia) 1996-2022 Didn't Enter

=== World Championships ===
Year	Host	Result	Pld	W	OTW	OTL	L
1930 through 1992; Pool C and B		Within Yugoslavia federal team					
1993 through 2026		Did not enter					
Total		0/0	–	–	–	–	–

=== Development Cup ===
Year	Host	Result	Pld	W	OTW	OTL	L
2017	(Andorra) Canillo	Did not participate					
2018	(Germany) Füssen	1st place	5	5	0	0	0
Total		1/2	5	5	0	0	0

== All-time record against other nations ==
Last match update: 21 November 2018

Key
Positive balance (more Wins)
Neutral balance (Wins = Losses)
Negative balance (more Losses)

Team	GP	W	T	L	GF	GA
Andorra	2	2	0	0	15	7
Bosnia and Herzegovina	2	1	0	1	14	14
Ireland	1	1	0	0	9	6
Portugal	2	2	0	0	14	7
Total	7	6	0	1	52	34

== All-time record against other clubs ==
Last match update: 21 December 2014

Key
Positive balance (more Wins)
Neutral balance (Wins = Losses)
Negative balance (more Losses)

Team	GP	W	T	L	GF	GA
Bulgaria U20	2	1	0	1	9	9
(Bulgaria) Red Star Sofia	1	0	0	1	1	4
Total	3	1	0	2	10	13
