= Andorran Federation of Ice Sports =

Organization governing ice sports in Andorra

Andorra
- Association name: Federació Andorrana d'Esports de Gel
- IIHF Code: AND
- IIHF membership: 4 May 1995
- President: Mònica López

The Andorran Federation of Ice Sports (Catalan: Federació Andorrana d'Esports de Gel, FAEG) is the governing body of ice hockey, curling, and figure skating in Andorra.

== Ice hockey statistics ==
- 52 players total
- 17 male players
- 24 junior players
- 11 female players
- No referees
- 1 indoor rink
- Not ranked in the world ranking
