= Andorra men's national ice hockey team =

National sports team

Andorra
- Association: Federació Andorrana d'Esports de Gel
- Head coach: Oriol Boronat
- Top scorer: Gerard Ávila (12)
- Most points: Gerard Ávila (16)
- Home stadium: Palau de Gel d'Andorra
- Team colors
- IIHF code: AND

Ranking
- Current IIHF: NR (26 May 2025)

First international
- Portugal 3–2 Andorra (Canillo, Andorra; 29 September 2017)

Biggest win
- Andorra 12–0 Portugal (Füssen, Germany; 6 May 2022)

Biggest defeat
- Liechtenstein 24–2 Andorra (Canillo, Andorra; April 26, 2025)

IIHF Development Cup
- Appearances: 3 (first in 2017)
- Best result: 4th (2017, 2018)

International record (W–L–T)
- 1–17–1

The Andorra national ice hockey team (Catalan: Selecció d'hoquei sobre gel d'Andorra) is the national men's ice hockey team of Andorra. The team is controlled by the Federació Andorrana d'Esports de Gel (FAEG) and has been an associate member of the International Ice Hockey Federation (IIHF).

== History ==
Ice hockey in Andorra as a sport began in 1987, with the opening of the Palau de Gel, the principality's only ice rink, in the town of Canillo. The Andorran Federation of Ice Sports, known in Catalan as the Federació Andorrana d'Esports de Gel (FAEG), was established in 1992 and later joined the IIHF on 4 May 1995. Despite not having a national team nor entering in any IIHF tournaments, Canillo was the host city of the 1997 IIHF World Championship Group D tournament, as well as the 2024 IIHF Women's World Championship Division II A tournament.

However, it was only in 2017, when an official Andorra national team was organized. The national team made its debut at the 2017 IIHF Development Cup which was hosted in Canillo. Andorra played Portugal, Ireland, and Morocco. They lost all of their matches in the tournament, including a 5–3 defeat to Portugal in the bronze medal match. Andorra's first match was on 29 September 2017 against Portugal, the match ended in a 3–2 defeat in penalty shootout.

In 2022, Andorra applied to participate in the IIHF World Championships, though the Andorran federation noted that the country had difficulty fulfilling IIHF criteria, which include having 60 registered players and a domestic league.

== Tournament record ==
=== World Championship ===
Year	Host	Result	Pld	W	OTW	OTL	L
1930 through 1994		Not a member of the IIHF					
1995 through 2026		Did not enter					
Total		0/0	–	–	–	–	–

=== IIHF Development Cup ===
Year	Host	Result	Pld	W	OTW	OTL	L
2017	(Andorra) Canillo	4th place	4	0	0	1	3
2018	(Germany) Füssen	4th place	5	0	0	0	5
2022	(Germany) Füssen	5th place	5	1	–	1*	3
2023	(Slovakia) Bratislava	Did not participate					
2024	(Slovakia) Bratislava	Did not participate					
2025	(Andorra) Canillo	6th place	5	0	0	0	5
Total		3/3	14	1	0	2	16

== All-time record against other national teams ==
As of 7 May 2022

Team	GP	W	T	L	GF	GA
Algeria	1	0	0	1	5	14
Brazil	1	0	0	1	4	7
Colombia	1	0	0	1	3	8
Greece	1	0	0	1	4	7
Ireland	4	0	1	3	20	25
Liechtenstein	2	0	0	2	6	32
Morocco	1	0	0	1	3	9
North Macedonia	2	0	0	2	7	15
Portugal	5	1	0	4	22	34
Puerto Rico	1	0	0	1	1	15
Total	19	1	1	17	75	166
