= Liechtenstein national ice hockey team =

Liechtenstein
- Association: Liechtensteiner Eishockey und Inline Verband
- Head coach: Herbert Schädler
- Assistants: Philipp Hollenstein
- Captain: Christian Walch
- Most games: Several players (5)
- Top scorer: Julian Bernard (17)
- Most points: Christian Walch (42)
- Team colors
- IIHF code: LIE

Ranking
- Current IIHF: NR (26 May 2025)

First international
- Luxembourg 7–1 Liechtenstein (Kockelscheuer, Luxembourg; 26 April 2003)

Biggest win
- Liechtenstein 24–2 Andorra (Canillo, Andorra; April 26, 2025)

Biggest defeat
- Luxembourg 7–1 Liechtenstein (Kockelscheuer, Luxembourg; 26 April 2003)

IIHF Development Cup
- Appearances: 3 (first in 2022)
- Best result: 1st (2023)

International record (W–L–T)
- 12–4–0

Medal record

IIHF Development Cup
Gold medal – first place	2023 Bratislava	
Silver medal – second place	2022 Füssen	
Silver medal – second place	2025 Canillo	

The Liechtenstein national ice hockey team (German: Liechtensteinische Eishockeynationalmannschaft) is the national men's ice hockey team of Liechtenstein. The team is controlled by the Liechtenstein Ice Hockey Federation and has been an associate member of the International Ice Hockey Federation (IIHF) since 4 October 2001. Liechtenstein is currently not ranked in the IIHF World Ranking and has not entered in any IIHF World Championship events.

== History ==
In 2001, Liechtenstein was first admitted to the International Ice Hockey Federation (IIHF) as an associate member. However, there are currently no ice rinks in Liechtenstein. In 2003, the national team played its first international game, a friendly game against Luxembourg, losing 7–1. They again played Luxembourg in 2007 in another friendly, losing 4–2.

In the summer of 2021, the national team was successfully reactivated. As a result, in May 2022, Liechtenstein participated for the first time in the IIHF Development Cup in Füssen, Germany, an international tournament for national teams that cannot participate in IIHF World Championships. After victories against Ireland (7–6), Portugal (3–0), Algeria (11–2), and Andorra (8–4), and a loss against tournament winner Colombia (1–3), they finished in second place among six teams.

== Players ==
The majority of the Liechtenstein national squad play for the principality's only adult club, EHC Vaduz-Schellenberg. Others play for the only youth club or are Liechtenstein citizens living abroad.

== Tournament record ==
=== IIHF Development Cup ===
Year	Host	Result	Pld	W	T	L
2022	(Germany) Füssen	2nd place	5	4	0	1
2023	(Slovakia) Bratislava	1st place	4	4	0	0
2024	(Slovakia) Bratislava	Did not participate				
2025	(Andorra) Canillo	2nd place	5	4	0	1
Total		3/3	14	12	0	2

== All-time record ==
Last match update: 26 April 2025

Team	GP	W	T	L	GF	GA
Algeria	1	1	0	0	11	2
Andorra	2	2	0	0	32	6
Argentina	1	1	0	0	6	5
Brazil	1	1	0	0	19	2
Colombia	2	1	0	1	11	7
Greece	1	1	0	0	13	0
Ireland	2	2	0	0	13	11
Luxembourg	2	0	0	2	3	11
Portugal	3	3	0	0	29	4
Puerto Rico	1	0	0	1	2	5
Total	16	12	0	4	139	53
