= Portugal men's national ice hockey team =

Portugal
- Nickname: Seleção
- Association: Federação de Desportos de Inverno de Portugal
- General manager: Cristina Lopes
- Head coach: Jim Aldred
- Captain: Higínio Ferreira
- Top scorer: Philip Sardinha (13)
- Most points: Philip Sardinha (16)
- Team colors
- IIHF code: POR

Ranking
- Current IIHF: NR (26 May 2025)

First international
- Portugal 3–2 Andorra (Canillo, Andorra; 29 September 2017)

Biggest win
- Portugal 15–3 Andorra (Canillo, Andorra; April 23, 2025)

Biggest defeat
- Liechtenstein 21–0 Portugal (Bratislava, Slovakia; 3 May 2023)

International record (W–L–T)
- 12–17–0

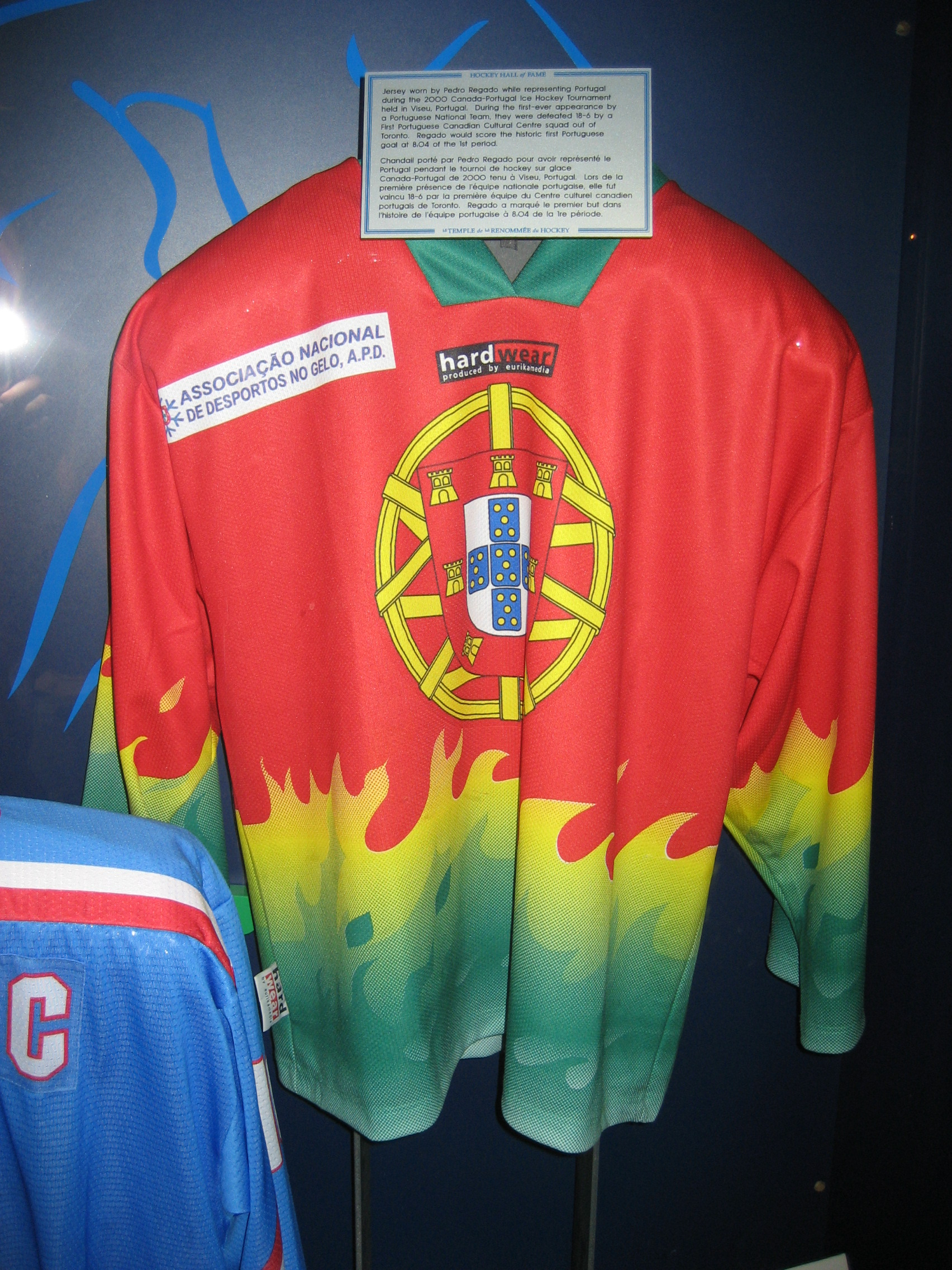
Portugal's national hockey team jersey, Hockey Hall-of-Fame Toronto

Team Portugal, January 2016, at Prague, Czech Republic

The Portuguese national ice hockey team (Portuguese: Seleção Portuguesa de Hóquei no Gelo) is the national men's ice hockey team of Portugal. The team was previously controlled by the Federation of Portuguese Ice Sports (FPDG.) In September 2017, control was given to the Federação de Desportos de Inverno de Portugal, which also retains the associate membership within the International Ice Hockey Federation (IIHF), which had been acquired by the FPDG on May 13, 1999. Portugal is currently not ranked in the IIHF World Rankings and is still not actively competing in any World Championship events.

== History ==
=== 2000 ===
Ice hockey was played in Portugal from 1996 until 2006 in the Palácio do Gelo shopping center, in Viseu. Since 2010, ice hockey practices and friendly games have been played in Elvas, Portugal.

In 2000, the national team of Portugal played three games, the only games they ever played. The team they compiled to play was made up of former Portuguese immigrants who played ice hockey in the United States and Canada, as well as former players from traditional roller hockey. The event consisted of three games between the newly created national team of Portugal and the First Portuguese Canadian Cultural Center (FPCCC) from Toronto, Ontario, representing Canada. The games were held from June 21 to June 23, 2000, at the Palácio do Gelo in Viseu.

The tournament was a game venture by the Federação Portuguesa de Desportos No Gelo and the Embassy of Canada, namely the Ambassador of Canada, Robert Vanderloo. The event was also sponsored by Banco Comercial Português and Nortel.

The FPCCC won the first game 18–6 and the second 21–5. Pedro Regado was the first ever player to score for Portugal when he scored on 8:04 mark of the first period. The third and final game was played with the decision to mix-up the teams, placing Portuguese descendants of the FPCCC on the Portuguese team. At the end of the third match, the score was a close 15–11 for FPCCC. Portugal has not played an organized match until 2015.

=== 2015 onwards ===
In January 2015, Portugal returned to play two international exhibition games, against the Čeští lvi in Elvas, Portugal. Portugal won their first game ever with a 6–4 win and a 6–2 win on the day after. This exhibition games were sponsored by the Czech Republic embassy in Portugal, namely by the strong support of Czech ambassador Stanislav Kázecký.

On January 14, 2016. Portugal played two exhibition games in Prague, Czech Republic. Portugal lost 0–2 against the Čeští Lvi and 0–3 against the Sklepovští Sršáni. Two days afterwards Portugal won their first ever away game with a 4–3 victory against the Čeští Lvi.

On 14 and 15 January 2017, Portugal hosted a quadrangular tournament in Elvas, Portugal. This was the largest ice hockey competition ever held in the country. Other than team Portugal, there were invited two teams from Czech Republic, the Čeští Lvi, the Sklepovští Sršáni and the second division French team Evry-Viry Jets. Even if Portugal was not able to conquer the tournament, this event was another step forward for the Portuguese ice hockey community and showed their capacity of organizing an international event.

Portugal played on 22 and 23 April 2017 at an international tournament with teams from Norway, Finland and Spain at Granada, Spain. The national team now led by their Canadian Coach Jim Aldred was able to retain a 6–0 victory against the Granada Eagles. It was the first away tournament played by Portugal and it showed a clear improvement in their level of play. Aldred's team affiliated with the Portuguese Winter Sports Federation (FDIP), and he was invitated to oversee the Portugal national team, with his wife as the manager.

The first international event Aldred coached for Portugal was the inaugural IIHF Development Cup, hosted in Andorra in 2017. Winning their debut game in a shootout by a 3–2 score versus the Andorra national team, Portugal had losses to the Ireland national team and the Morocco national team. In the third-place match, Portugal defeated Andorra by a 5–3 score for the bronze medal. Later in 2017, Aldred led Portugal to a second-place finish at a ten-team tournament in his former hometown of Nijmegen.

On April 28 and 29, 2018, Portugal returned to Granada to play the Mr. Taxi Cup.

Returning to the Development Cup in 2018, Aldred added players from the Portuguese diaspora to earned a silver medal, following a loss by a 4–5 score to the North Macedonia national team. Portugal had two wins and one loss, and scored 27 goals in three tournament games.

When the IIHF Development Cup resumed in 2022, Aldred coached the Portugal national team each year since. After two consecutive cups without winning a game, (Note: Portugal were winless in five games in 2022. Portugal were winless in four games in 2023.) Portugal placed second at the 2024 Development Cup with a loss to the Ireland national team by a 5–1 score in the final game.

In July 2023, Ice Hockey Club Porto was established by national team head coach Jim Aldred, with the aim of developing the quality of Portuguese-based ice hockey players. The team became the first Portuguese team to join the Spanish Liga Nacional de Hockey Hielo (LNHH).

Aldred has cited the lack of a standard-sized rink as the primary obstacle to developing ice hockey in Portugal. In collaborating with the FDIP, Aldred hopes for a rink in the Lisbon metropolitan area, in addition to the Olympic-sized rink scheduled for the Porto metropolitan area, to open in Trofa in 2025.

== Current roster ==
No.	Pos	Name	Height	Weight	Birthdate	Birthplace
20	G	Maxim Andreyev	1.82 m (6 ft 0 in)	87 kg (192 lb)	February 27, 1989 (age 37)	(Kazakhstan)
30	G	Ivan Silva	1.88 m (6 ft 2 in)	73 kg (161 lb)	April 24, 1997 (age 28)	(Spain)
09	D	Maurício Xavier	1.75 m (5 ft 9 in)	99 kg (218 lb)	January 17, 1966 (age 60)	(Portugal)
08	D	Filipe Paulo	1.82 m (6 ft 0 in)	70 kg (150 lb)	January 8, 1982 (age 44)	(Portugal)
81	D	Sylvain Rodrigues	1.71 m (5 ft 7 in)	81 kg (179 lb)	August 15, 1987 (age 38)	(France)
71	D	Yuri El-Zein	1.82 m (6 ft 0 in)	92 kg (203 lb)	June 4, 1999 (age 26)	(Portugal)
03	D	Diogo Esteves Rocha	1.83 m (6 ft 0 in)	74 kg (163 lb)	September 17, 1997 (age 28)	(Switzerland)
93	D	Jeshon Assunção	1.75 m (5 ft 9 in)	76 kg (168 lb)	April 12, 1993 (age 32)	(Switzerland)
19	D	Pedro Cardoso	1.83 m (6 ft 0 in)	98 kg (216 lb)	March 1, 1975 (age 51)	(Switzerland)
07	F	Kevin Hortinha	1.62 m (5 ft 4 in)	82 kg (181 lb)	October 4, 1978 (age 47)	(Canada)
10	F	Diogo Xavier	1.75 m (5 ft 9 in)	70 kg (150 lb)	June 7, 1992 (age 33)	(Portugal)
19	F	Guilherme Morais	1.84 m (6 ft 0 in)	72 kg (159 lb)	February 19, 1994 (age 32)	(Portugal)
88	F	Isaac Carreiro	1.68 m (5 ft 6 in)	68 kg (150 lb)	November 19, 2000 (age 25)	(Canada)
89	F	Brandon Gay	1.78 m (5 ft 10 in)	70 kg (150 lb)	March 10, 1994 (age 31)	(Switzerland)
29	F	Hervé José Alves	1.73 m (5 ft 8 in)	75 kg (165 lb)	July 27, 1988 (age 37)	(Switzerland)
74	F	Higínio Ferreira	1.75 m (5 ft 9 in)	82 kg (181 lb)	February 10, 1984 (age 42)	(Switzerland)
33	D	Ricardo Schläpfer	1.78 m (5 ft 7 in)	78 kg (172 lb)	December 12, 1998 (age 27)	(Switzerland)
15	F	Philip Sardinha	1.80 m (5 ft 11 in)	88 kg (195 lb)	June 11, 1996 (age 29)	(Canada)
73	F	Corentin Rodrigues	1.83 m (5 ft 12 in)	73 kg (161 lb)	August 20, 1998 (age 27)	(Switzerland)

== Tournament results ==
=== IIHF Development Cup ===
- 2017, Canillo, Andorra: bronze
- 2018, Füssen, Germany: silver
- 2022, Füssen, Germany: 6th place
- 2023, Bratislava, Slovakia: 5th place
- 2024, Bratislava, Slovakia: silver
- 2025, Canillo, Andorra: bronze

== All-time international record ==
As of 26 April 2025

Team	GP	W	T	L	GF	GA
Algeria	1	0	0	1	1	9
Andorra	5	4	0	1	34	22
Argentina	2	1	0	1	10	14
Brazil	2	2	0	0	16	2
Colombia	3	1	0	2	10	32
Greece	2	2	0	0	17	2
Ireland	7	2	0	5	35	49
Liechtenstein	3	0	0	3	4	29
North Macedonia	2	0	0	2	7	14
Morocco	1	0	0	1	2	11
Puerto Rico	1	0	0	1	1	2
Total	29	12	0	17	137	186

== Press articles ==
- Diário de Notícias: Falta um terreno para a semente do hóquei no gelo português florescer
- Sapo 24:Jogar hóquei no gelo... na praça de touros de Elvas
- Sapo 24:Hóquei no Gelo: Portugal conquista a primeira vitória internacional
- Sapo Desporto:Portugal Venceu República Checa em Gelo Alentejano
- Sapo 24:Jogar hóquei no gelo... na praça de touros de Elvas
- Correio da Manhã Jornal:Federação de Desportos no Gelo quer pista em Lisboa
- Público:Uma nova selecção nacional
- Diário de Notícias:Primeiras vitórias internacionais podem impulsionar hóquei no gelo em Portugal
- IIHF:Portugal goes on ice: Interview With Maurício Xavier and Ivan Silva
- National Teams of Ice Hockey: Portugal Wins First Ever Ice Hockey Game
- The Hockey Writers: 2017 Development Cup Sees Two National Teams Debut
- National Teams of Ice Hockey: Interview and Q & A With Luis de Almeida Johansson
- TSF: Primeiras vitórias internacionais podem impulsionar hóquei no gelo em Portugal
- National Euro Hockey: The new pioneers- Interview With Luis de Almeida Johansson
- Embaixada Checa em Lisboa: O hóquei no gelo português estreou-se em Praga
- Lidovsky: Záruba proháněl po ledě mladé hokejisty. Herec Vávra slavil triumf díky rumu
- Lidovsky: Portugalští hokejisté vzkazují Ronaldovi a spol: Fotbal je hra pro ‚buzeranty'
- Sapo Desporto: Curling, Luge e Hóquei no Gelo vão integrar Federação de Desportos de Inverno
- Elvas News: Coliseu Acolheu Torneio Internacional de Hóquei no Gelo
- Sic Notícias: Grupo de adeptos de hóquei no gelo usou pista de Natal em Elvas para jogar
- Portal Alentejano: Elvas: Equipas amadoras de hóquei no gelo
- Hockey Archives: Interview with Ronald Calhau, 03/12/2001
- Sapo Desporto: Portugal Conquista o Segundo Lugar em Torneio Internacional na Holanda
- Jornal de Notícias: A Falta que faz uma Pista de Gelo das Cidades
- Sapo Desporto: O Inverno Chegou Só Falta o Milagre do Gelo
- Sapo 24: Sonham com Uma Pista de Gelo e Gostavam que Sporting ou Benfica Seguissem o Exemplo
