= List of men's national ice hockey teams =

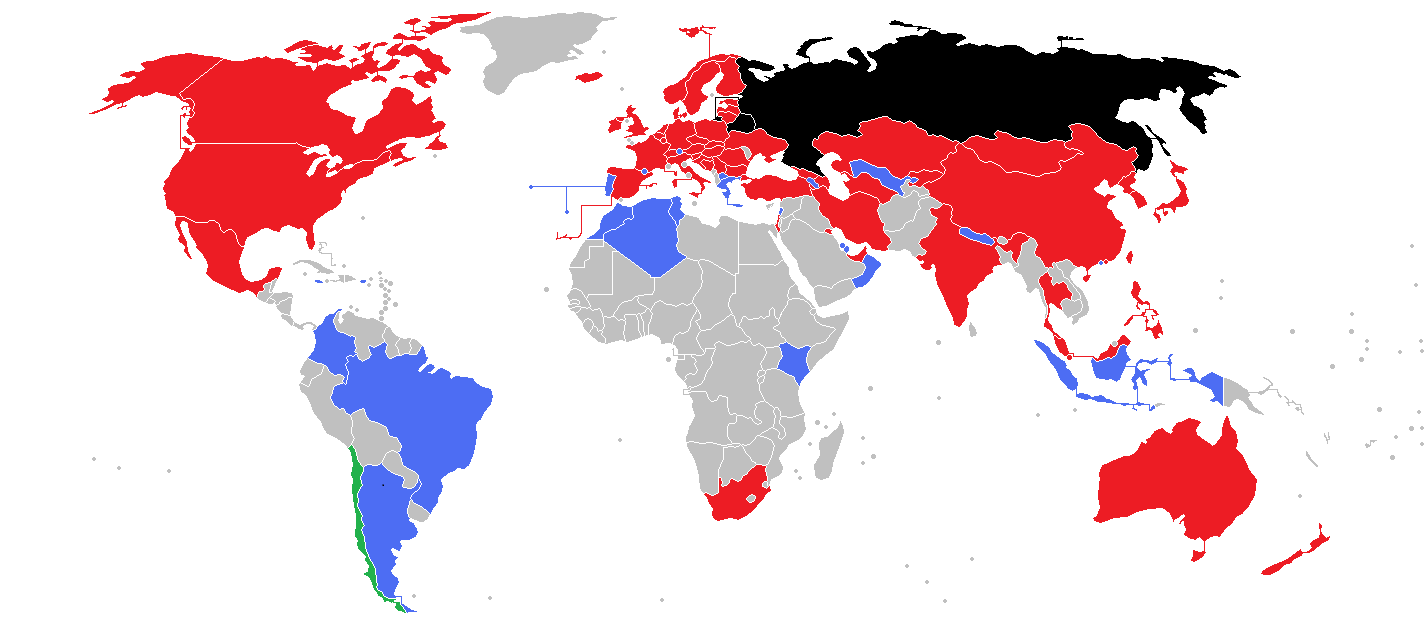
Map of the world with current members of the IIHF. (Red indicates full members, blue indicates associate members, green indicates affiliate members and black indicates suspended members.)

This is a list of men's national ice hockey teams in the world. There are fewer than 100 national ice hockey teams in total, with teams representing UN member states, as well as several dependent territories, sub-national entities and states who are not members of the United Nations.

== Current men's national ice hockey teams ==
This section lists the current:

- 83 men's national ice hockey teams which are members of the International Ice Hockey Federation (IIHF), including 62 full members, 20 associate members and one affiliate member.
- 6 men's national ice hockey teams which are not members of the IIHF.

=== IIHF Full Members ===
IIHF Full Members are nations that regularly participate in the IIHF-sanctioned World Championships. Teams are ranked in the IIHF World Ranking based on their performance over the past four years.

- Armenia
- Australia
- Austria⮝
- Azerbaijan^{1}
- Belarus^{2}
- Belgium
- Bosnia and Herzegovina
- Bulgaria
- Canada⮝🥈
- China
- Chinese Taipei
- Croatia
- Czechia
- Denmark⮝
- Estonia
- Finland⮝🥉
- France
- Georgia
- Germany⮝
- Great Britain⮝
- Hong Kong
- Hungary⮝
- Iceland
- India^{3}
- Iran
- Ireland^{4}
- Israel
- Italy⮝
- Japan
- Kazakhstan
- Kuwait
- Kyrgyzstan
- Latvia⮝
- Lithuania
- Luxembourg
- Malaysia
- Mexico
- Mongolia
- Netherlands
- New Zealand
- North Korea
- Norway⮝
- Philippines
- Poland
- Romania
- Russia^{2}
- Serbia
- Singapore
- Slovakia⮝
- Slovenia⮝
- South Africa
- South Korea
- Spain
- Sweden⮝
- Switzerland⮝
- Thailand
- Turkey
- Turkmenistan
- Ukraine
- United Arab Emirates
- United States⮝🥇🏆
- Uzbekistan

The participants in the 2026 IIHF World Championship Top Division are marked by ⮝.
The current holder of the 2025 IIHF World Championship is marked by 🏆.
The current medalists of the 2026 Winter Olympics are marked by 🥇🥈🥉.
1. Azerbaijan has not yet played any official matches against other national teams.
2. Russia and Belarus were suspended by the IIHF on 28 February 2022 due to their invasion of Ukraine.
3. India has participated in the IIHF Asia Cup, but has not yet entered the World Championships.
4. Ireland has participated in the World Championships in the past, but is currently not doing so.

=== IIHF Associate and Affiliate Members ===
IIHF Associate Members either do not have their own independent ice hockey association or have one, but do not meet the minimum participation standards for the IIHF World Championships. Teams in this category generally compete in events outside the IIHF World Championship structure; such as the IIHF Development Cup, IIHF Asia Cup (formerly Asia and Oceania Championship), Asian Winter Games, or Amerigol LATAM Cup. Chile is an IIHF Affiliate Member, a unique category for nations that only participated in the now-defunct IIHF Inline Hockey World Championship.

- Algeria
- Andorra
- Argentina
- Bahrain
- Brazil
- Chile (affiliate member)
- Colombia
- Greece^{1}
- Indonesia^{2}
- Jamaica
- Kenya^{3}
- Lebanon
- Liechtenstein
- Macau
- Morocco
- North Macedonia
- Oman
- Portugal
- Puerto Rico
- Qatar
- Tunisia

1. Greece has participated in the World Championships in the past, but is currently not doing so.
2. National team currently participates in the World Championships.
3. Kenya has not yet played any official matches against other national teams.

Nepal is an IIHF Associate Member but does not have a national ice hockey team. Moldova and Namibia were formerly members of the IIHF, but left the organization without ever having formed national ice hockey teams.

=== Non-IIHF Members ===
The following countries are not members of the IIHF, but have national ice hockey teams that have played at least one official international match.

- Egypt
- Falkland Islands
- Haiti
- Saudi Arabia
- Venezuela

The following countries are not members of the IIHF, but have national ice hockey teams that have played at least one unofficial match against a club or selection team.

- Peru

== Former men's national ice hockey teams ==
The following national ice hockey teams have ceased to exist.

- Bohemia
- CIS ( Unified Team)
- Costa Rica^{1}
- Czechoslovakia
- East Germany
- England
- Malta^{1}
- Northern Ireland^{1}
- Protectorate of Bohemia and Moravia
- Saint Pierre and Miquelon
- Scotland
- Serbia and Montenegro
- Soviet Union
- West Germany
- Yugoslavia

1. National team only played unofficial matches against club or selection teams.

== Multinational teams ==
Exhibition teams representing multiple countries in Europe and North America participated in the 2016 World Cup of Hockey.

- Europe
- North America

A combined team representing the seven nations in Central America has played at the Amerigol LATAM Cup.

- Central America

== Regional teams ==
- Basque Country
- Catalonia

== See also ==
- Ice hockey by country
- List of ice hockey leagues
- List of members of the International Ice Hockey Federation
- List of women's national ice hockey teams
