= List of members of the International Ice Hockey Federation =

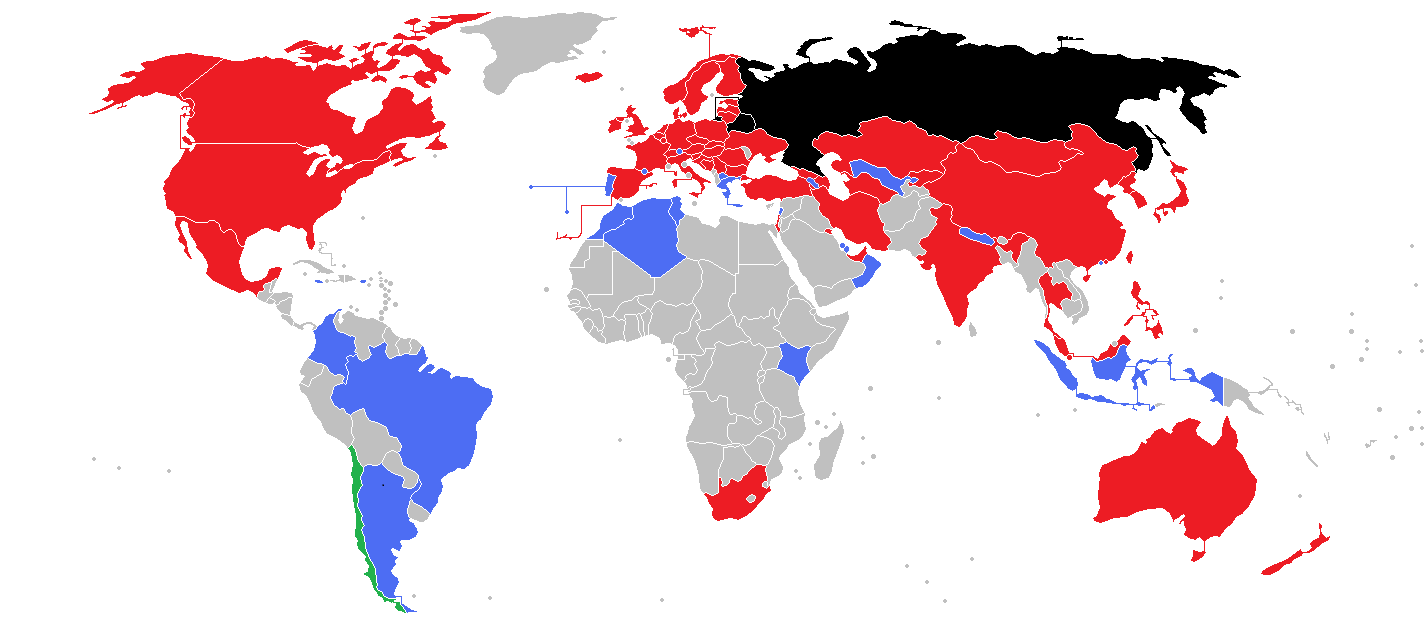
Map of the world with current members of the IIHF. Red indicates full members, blue indicates associate members, green indicates affiliate members and black indicates suspended members.

The International Ice Hockey Federation (IIHF) is the worldwide governing body for ice hockey. It is based in Zurich, Switzerland, and maintains the international ice hockey rulebook, processes international player transfers, dictates officiating guidelines and is responsible for the management of international ice hockey tournaments. The IIHF was created on 15 May 1908, under the name (in French) Ligue Internationale de Hockey sur Glace (LIHG). Belgium, France, Great Britain, Switzerland, and Bohemia (now the Czech Republic) were the founding members. The IIHF was composed entirely of European teams until 1920, when Canada and the United States joined.

As of September 2024, the IIHF has 84 members. Bahrain and Kenya are the newest members, having joined on 28 September 2024.

There are three levels of membership in the IIHF. The highest level, IIHF Full Members, are nations that have their own independent ice hockey association and regularly participate in IIHF World Championships. The second level, IIHF Associate Members, either do not have their own independent ice hockey association or have one, but do not meet their minimum participation standards in the IIHF World Championships. The third level, IIHF Affiliate Members, is for nations that only participate in the now-defunct Inline Hockey World Championships. The federation has 62 full members, (including two suspended members), 21 associate members and one affiliate member. Full Members can vote in IIHF Congresses, while Associate and Affiliate Members cannot.

In 2025, 58 IIHF members participate in the Men's World Championships and 45 participate in the Women's World Championships.

== Members ==
IIHF World Ranking information is accurate as 26 May 2025.
In the Teams column
Text in **boldface** indicates that the team participated in its corresponding event in 2019.
| M | Men's Ice Hockey World Championships |
| M-U20 | World Junior Championships |
| M-U18 | World Under-18 Championships |
| W | World Women's Championships |
| W-U18 | World Women's Under-18 Championships |
| Inline | Inline Hockey World Championships (defunct) |

=== Full members ===
| Nation | Date joined | Organization | President | Teams | Men's ranking | Women's ranking | Ref. |
|---|---|---|---|---|---|---|---|
| Armenia^{[A]} | 22 September 1999 | Ice Hockey Federation of Armenia | Vahram Sargsyan | M, M-U20, M-U18, W, W-U18, inline | 60 | — | |
| Australia | 11 February 1938 | Ice Hockey Australia | Ryan O'Handley | **M**, **M-U20**, **M-U18**, **W**, **W-U18**, inline | 36 | 29 | |
| Austria | 18 March 1912^{[B]} | Austrian Ice Hockey Association | Klaus Hartmann | **M**, **M-U20**, **M-U18**, **W**, **W-U18**, inline | 12 | 14 | |
| Azerbaijan | 6 May 1992 | Ice Hockey Federation of the Republic of Azerbaijan | Valery Laryukov | M, M-U20, M-U18, W, W-U18, inline | — | — | |
| Belarus (suspended)^{[C]} | 6 May 1992 | Belarusian Ice Hockey Association | Alexander Bogdanovich | M, M-U20, M-U18, W, W-U18, inline | 16 | — | |
| Belgium | 8 December 1908 | Royal Belgian Ice Hockey Federation | Pascal Nuchelmans | **M**, **M-U20**, **M-U18**, **W**, W-U18, inline | 37 | 31 | |
| Bosnia and Herzegovina | 8 May 2001 | Bosnia and Herzegovina Ice Hockey Federation | Adnan Korić | **M**, M-U20, M-U18, W, W-U18, inline | 49 | 44 | |
| Bulgaria | 25 July 1960 | Bulgarian Ice Hockey Federation | Martin Milanov | **M**, **M-U20**, **M-U18**, **W**, W-U18, inline | 38 | 38 | |
| Canada | 26 April 1920^{[D]} | Hockey Canada | Katherine Henderson | **M**, **M-U20**, **M-U18**, **W**, **W-U18**, inline | 4 | 2 | |
| China | 25 July 1963 | Chinese Ice Hockey Association | Cao Weidong | **M**, **M-U20**, **M-U18**, **W**, **W-U18**, inline | 27 | 13 | |
| Chinese Taipei | 1 September 1983 | Chinese Taipei Ice Hockey Federation | Hsieh Chun-huang | **M**, **M-U20**, **M-U18**, **W**, **W-U18**, inline | 40 | 26 | |
| Croatia | 6 May 1992 | Croatian Ice Hockey Federation | Vjekoslav Jadrešić | **M**, **M-U20**, **M-U18**, **W**, W-U18, inline | 31 | 37 | |
| Czechia | 15 November 1908^{[E]} | Czech Ice Hockey Association | Alois Hadamczik | **M**, **M-U20**, **M-U18**, **W**, **W-U18**, inline | 6 | 4 | |
| Denmark | 27 April 1946 | Danish Ice Hockey Union | Henrik Bach Nielsen | **M**, **M-U20**, **M-U18**, **W**, **W-U18**, inline | 9 | 11 | |
| Estonia | 17 February 1935^{[F]} | Estonian Ice Hockey Association | Rauno Parras | **M**, **M-U20**, **M-U18**, W, W-U18, inline | 28 | 42 | |
| Finland | 10 February 1928 | Finnish Ice Hockey Association | Harri Nummela | **M**, **M-U20**, **M-U18**, **W**, **W-U18**, inline | 7 | 3 | |
| France | 20 October 1908 | French Ice Hockey Federation | Pierre-Yves Gerbeau | **M**, **M-U20**, **M-U18**, **W**, **W-U18**, inline | 15 | 15 | |
| Georgia | 8 May 2009 | Georgian Ice Hockey National Federation | Zakaria Khechuashvili | **M**, M-U20, M-U18, W, W-U18, inline | 47 | — | |
| Germany | 19 September 1909^{[G]} | German Ice Hockey Federation | Peter Merten | **M**, **M-U20**, **M-U18**, **W**, **W-U18**, inline | 8 | 9 | |
| Great Britain | 19 November 1908 | Ice Hockey UK | Clifton Wrottesley | **M**, **M-U20**, **M-U18**, **W**, **W-U18**, inline | 19 | 20 | |
| Hong Kong | 30 April 1983 | Hong Kong Ice Hockey Association | Yeung Kit Kan | **M**, M-U20, **M-U18**, **W**, W-U18, inline | 50 | 32 | |
| Hungary | 24 January 1927 | Hungarian Ice Hockey Federation | György Such | **M**, **M-U20**, **M-U18**, **W**, **W-U18**, inline | 18 | 10 | |
| Iceland | 6 May 1992 | Ice Hockey Iceland | Helgi Páll Þórisson | **M**, **M-U20**, **M-U18**, **W**, W-U18, inline | 35 | 28 | |
| India | 27 April 1989 | Ice Hockey Association of India | Surinder Mohan Bali | M, M-U20, M-U18, W, W-U18, inline | — | — | |
| Iran | 26 September 2019 | Islamic Republic of Iran Skating Federation | Majid Honarjo | **M**, M-U20, M-U18, W, W-U18, inline | 56 | — | |
| Ireland | 26 September 1996 | Irish Ice Hockey Association | Aaron Guli | M, M-U20, M-U18, W, W-U18, inline | — | — | |
| Israel | 1 May 1991 | Israel Ice Hockey Federation | Levav Weinberg | **M**, **M-U20**, **M-U18**, W, W-U18, inline | 33 | 43 | |
| Italy | 24 January 1924 | Italian Ice Sports Federation | Andrea Gios | **M**, **M-U20**, **M-U18**, **W**, **W-U18**, inline | 20 | 18 | |
| Japan | 26 January 1930^{[H]} | Japan Ice Hockey Federation | Akihisa Mizuno | **M**, **M-U20**, **M-U18**, **W**, **W-U18**, inline | 22 | 8 | |
| Kazakhstan | 6 May 1992 | Kazakhstan Ice Hockey Federation | Askar Mamin | **M**, **M-U20**, **M-U18**, **W**, **W-U18**, inline | 14 | 23 | |
| Kuwait | 8 May 2009^{[I]} | Kuwait Ice Hockey Association | Faheed Hamas Al-Ajmi | **M**, M-U20, M-U18, W, W-U18, inline | 55 | — | |
| Kyrgyzstan | 14 May 2011 | Ice Hockey Federation of the Kyrgyz Republic | Anvar Omorkanov | **M**, M-U20, M-U18, W, W-U18, inline | 43 | — | |
| Latvia | 22 February 1931^{[F]} | Latvian Ice Hockey Federation | Aigars Kalvītis | **M**, **M-U20**, **M-U18**, **W**, W-U18, inline | 11 | 24 | |
| Lithuania | 19 February 1938^{[F]} | Hockey Lietuva | Dainius Zubrus | **M**, **M-U20**, **M-U18**, W, W-U18, inline | 26 | 34 | |
| Luxembourg | 23 March 1912 | Luxembourg Ice Hockey Federation | Alain Schneider | **M**, M-U20, M-U18, W, W-U18, inline | 46 | — | |
| Malaysia | 28 September 2006 | Malaysia Ice Hockey Federation | Haniff Mahmood | **M**, M-U20, M-U18, W, W-U18, inline | 57 | — | |
| Mexico | 30 April 1985 | Mexico Ice Hockey Federation | Joaquín de la Garma | **M**, **M-U20**, **M-U18**, **W**, **W-U18**, inline | 45 | 27 | |
| Mongolia | 15 May 1999 | Mongolian Hockey Federation | Javkhlan Bold | **M**, M-U20, M-U18, W, W-U18, inline | 53 | — | |
| Netherlands | 20 January 1935 | Netherlands Ice Hockey Association | Jan Hopstaken | **M**, **M-U20**, **M-U18**, **W**, **W-U18**, inline | 30 | 17 | |
| New Zealand | 2 May 1977 | New Zealand Ice Hockey Federation | Andy Mills | **M**, **M-U20**, **M-U18**, **W**, W-U18, inline | 39 | 33 | |
| North Korea | 8 August 1963 | Ice Hockey Association of the DPR Korea | Kim Kyong-jun | **M**, M-U20, M-U18, **W**, W-U18, inline | 54 | 40 | |
| Norway | 20 January 1935 | Norwegian Ice Hockey Association | Tage Pettersen | **M**, **M-U20**, **M-U18**, **W**, **W-U18**, inline | 13 | 12 | |
| Philippines | 20 May 2016 | Federation of Ice Hockey League | Christopher G. Sy | **M**, M-U20, M-U18, W, W-U18, inline | 52 | — | |
| Poland | 11 January 1926 | Polish Ice Hockey Federation | Mirosław Minkina | **M**, **M-U20**, **M-U18**, **W**, **W-U18**, inline | 21 | 21 | |
| Romania | 24 January 1924 | Romanian Ice Hockey Federation | Alexandru Hălăucă | **M**, **M-U20**, **M-U18**, **W**, **W-U18**, inline | 23 | 39 | |
| Russia (suspended)^{[C]} | 1 April 1952^{[J]} | Ice Hockey Federation of Russia | Vladislav Tretiak | M, M-U20, M-U18, W, W-U18, inline | 1 | 6 | |
| Serbia | 1 January 1939^{[K]} | Serbian Ice Hockey Association | Marko Milovanović | **M**, **M-U20**, **M-U18**, W, W-U18, inline | 32 | 41 | |
| Singapore | 2 May 1996 | Singapore Ice Hockey Association | Diana Mei See Foo | **M**, M-U20, M-U18, W, W-U18, inline | 51 | 46 | |
| Slovakia | 2 February 1993 | Slovak Ice Hockey Federation | Miroslav Šatan | **M**, **M-U20**, **M-U18**, **W**, **W-U18**, inline | 10 | 16 | |
| Slovenia | 6 May 1992 | Ice Hockey Federation of Slovenia | Matjaž Rakovec | **M**, **M-U20**, **M-U18**, **W**, W-U18, inline | 17 | 22 | |
| South Africa | 25 February 1937 | South African Ice Hockey Federation | Jason Cerff | **M**, **M-U20**, **M-U18**, **W**, W-U18, inline | 48 | 36 | |
| South Korea | 25 July 1960 | Korea Ice Hockey Association | Lee Ho-jin | **M**, **M-U20**, **M-U18**, **W**, W-U18, inline | 25 | 19 | |
| Spain | 10 March 1923 | Royal Spanish Ice Sports Federation | Frank González | **M**, **M-U20**, **M-U18**, **W**, **W-U18**, inline | 29 | 25 | |
| Sweden | 23 March 1912 | Swedish Ice Hockey Association | Anders Larsson | **M**, **M-U20**, **M-U18**, **W**, **W-U18**, inline | 5 | 7 | |
| Switzerland | 23 November 1908 | Swiss Ice Hockey Federation | Michael Rindlisbacher | **M**, **M-U20**, **M-U18**, **W**, **W-U18**, inline | 3 | 5 | |
| Thailand | 27 April 1989 | Ice Hockey Association of Thailand | M. L. Krisada Kasemsunt | **M**, M-U20, M-U18, W, W-U18, inline | 42 | 45 | |
| Turkey | 1 May 1991 | Turkish Ice Hockey Federation | Halit Albayrak | **M**, **M-U20**, **M-U18**, **W**, **W-U18**, inline | 41 | 30 | |
| Turkmenistan | 15 May 2015 | Turkmenistan Ice Hockey Federation | Jora Hudayberdiyev | **M**, M-U20, M-U18, W, W-U18, inline | 44 | — | |
| Ukraine | 6 May 1992 | Ice Hockey Federation of Ukraine | Georgi Zubko | **M**, **M-U20**, **M-U18**, **W**, W-U18, inline | 24 | 35 | |
| United Arab Emirates | 10 May 2001 | UAE Ice Sports Federation | Ahmed Mubarak Al-Mazrouei | **M**, M-U20, M-U18, W, W-U18, inline | 34 | — | |
| United States | 22 March 1947^{[L]} | USA Hockey | Mike Trimboli | **M**, **M-U20**, **M-U18**, **W**, **W-U18**, inline | 2 | 1 | |
| Uzbekistan | 26 September 2019 | Uzbekistan Ice Hockey Federation | Bakhtiyor Fazilov | M, M-U20, M-U18, W, W-U18, inline | 59 | — | |

A. Armenia was suspended by the IIHF in April 2010 for use of ineligible players on their national team that participated in the 2010 IIHF World Championship Division III Group B in Yerevan, Armenia. The suspension was lifted in 2015.
B. Austria was expelled from the IIHF in 1920, then re-admitted on January 24, 1924. It was again expelled in 1939 and re-admitted on 27 April 1946.
C. Russia and Belarus were suspended indefinitely by the IIHF on 28 February 2022 from competing in the IIHF World Championship because of Russia's invasion of Ukraine, and Belarusian support.
D. The Canadian Amateur Hockey Association withdrew from the LIHG on 13 April 1944, then rejoined on 22 March 1947, as part of the merger with the International Ice Hockey Association.
E. The IIHF recognizes Bohemia, which joined in 1908, and Czechoslovakia as the predecessors to the Czech Republic, which officially became a member in 1993.
F. In 1940, Estonia, Latvia and Lithuania were annexed by the Soviet Union. Their membership expired on 27 April 1946. The three nations were re-admitted into the IIHF on 6 May 1992.
G. Germany was expelled in 1920, then re-admitted on January 11, 1926. It was again expelled on 27 April 1946. West Germany and East Germany were admitted into the IIHF in 1951 and 1954, respectively. Following their reunification, Germany was re-admitted into the IIHF on 3 October 1990.
H. Japan was expelled from the IIHF on 27 April 1946, then re-admitted on 10 March 1951.
I. Kuwait had originally joined the IIHF in 1985, but was expelled in 1992 due to a lack of ice hockey activity.
J. The IIHF recognizes the Soviet Union, which joined in 1952, as the predecessor to Russia, which officially became a member in 1992.
K. The IIHF recognizes Yugoslavia, which joined in 1939, as the predecessor to Serbia, which officially became a member on 28 September 2006.
L. On 22 March 1947, the LIHG chose to recognize the Amateur Hockey Association of the United States instead of the Amateur Athletic Union as the governing body of ice hockey in the United States, as part of the merger with the International Ice Hockey Association.

=== Associate and affiliate members ===
| Nation | Date joined | Organization | President | Teams | Men's ranking | Women's ranking | Ref. |
|---|---|---|---|---|---|---|---|
| Algeria | 26 September 2019 | Hockey Algeria | Karim Kerbouche | M, M-U20, M-U18, W, W-U18, inline | — | — | |
| Andorra | 4 May 1995 | Andorran Federation of Ice Sports | Josep Garcia | M, M-U20, M-U18, W, W-U18, inline | — | — | |
| Argentina | 31 May 1998 | Argentine Association of Ice and In-Line Hockey | Jorge Haiek | M, M-U20, M-U18, W, W-U18, inline | — | — | |
| Bahrain | 28 September 2024 | Bahrain Hockey Committee | Abdullah Al-Qasimi | M, M-U20, M-U18, W, W-U18, inline | — | — | |
| Brazil | 26 June 1984 | Brazilian Ice Sports Federation | Matheus Figueiredo | M, M-U20, M-U18, W, W-U18, inline | — | — | |
| Chile (affiliate member) | 22 September 1999 | Chilean Ice and Inline Hockey Federation | Mónica Arias | M, M-U20, M-U18, W, W-U18, inline | — | — | |
| Colombia | 26 September 2019 | Colombian Ice Hockey Federation | Daniel Fierro Torres | M, M-U20, M-U18, W, W-U18, inline | — | — | |
| Greece | 29 April 1987 | Hellenic Winter Sports Federation | Georgios Nikitidis | M, M-U20, M-U18, W, W-U18, inline | — | — | |
| Indonesia | 20 May 2016 | Indonesia Ice Hockey Federation | Ronald Situmeang | **M**, M-U20, M-U18, W, W-U18, inline | 58 | — | |
| Jamaica | 18 May 2012 | Jamaican Olympic Ice Hockey Federation | Don Anderson | M, M-U20, M-U18, W, W-U18, inline | — | — | |
| Kenya | 28 September 2024 | Kenya Federation of Ice Sports | Robert Opiyo | M, M-U20, M-U18, W, W-U18, inline | — | — | |
| Lebanon | 26 September 2019 | Lebanese Ice Hockey Federation | Charles El-Mir | M, M-U20, M-U18, W, W-U18, inline | — | — | |
| Liechtenstein | 4 October 2001 | Liechtenstein Ice Hockey Federation | Karl Otto Gämperli & Silke Bernard | M, M-U20, M-U18, W, W-U18, inline | — | — | |
| Macau | 12 May 2005 | Macau Ice Sports Federation | Chan Kwan Fai | M, M-U20, M-U18, W, W-U18, inline | — | — | |
| Morocco | 22 May 2010 | Royal Moroccan Ice Hockey Federation | Khalid Mrini | M, M-U20, M-U18, W, W-U18, inline | — | — | |
| Nepal | 20 May 2016 | Nepal Ice Hockey Association | Bhuwan Pathak | M, M-U20, M-U18, W, W-U18, inline | — | — | |
| North Macedonia | 4 October 2001 | Macedonian Ice Hockey Federation | Nikola Tasev | M, M-U20, M-U18, W, W-U18, inline | — | — | |
| Oman | 24 May 2014 | Oman Ice Sports Committee | Said Ali Hassan Al-Zaabi | M, M-U20, M-U18, W, W-U18, inline | — | — | |
| Portugal | 13 May 1999 | Portuguese Winter Sports Federation | Pedro Miguel dos Santos Farromba | M, M-U20, M-U18, W, W-U18, inline | — | — | |
| Puerto Rico | 29 September 2022 | Puerto Rico Ice Hockey Association | Scott Vargas | M, M-U20, M-U18, W, W-U18, inline | — | — | |
| Qatar | 18 May 2012 | Qatar Winter Sports Committee | Rashed Majed Al-Sulaiti | M, M-U20, M-U18, W, W-U18, inline | — | — | |
| Tunisia | 22 September 2021 | Tunisian Ice Hockey Association | Ihab Ayed | M, M-U20, M-U18, W, W-U18, inline | — | — | |

=== Former members ===
| Member | Date joined IIHF | Date left IIHF | Organization | Reason |
|---|---|---|---|---|
| Bohemia | 15 November 1908 | 26 April 1920 | Czech Hockey Union | Membership rights transferred to Czechoslovakia. |
| Czechoslovakia | 26 April 1920 | 31 December 1992 | Czechoslovak Hockey Association | Membership rights transferred to the Czech Republic. |
| East Germany | 9 June 1954 | 3 October 1990 | German Ice Skating Federation of the GDR | Reunification of East and West Germany. |
| Moldova | 20 May 2008 | 2023 | National Ice Hockey Federation of the Republic of Moldova | Membership ended following a prolonged lack of ice hockey activity. |
| Namibia | 31 May 1998 | 19 May 2017 | Namibia Ice and InLine Hockey Association | Withdrew from affiliate membership due to a lack of ice hockey activity. Maintains an inline hockey national team and is a member of World Skate. |
| Newfoundland | February 1933 | 1936 | Newfoundland Hockey Association | Expelled for unknown reasons. |
| (Canada) Oxford Canadians | 17 February 1911 | 26 April 1920 | Oxford Canadians Ice Hockey Club | Membership ended after Canada joined in 1920. |
| Russian Empire | 17 February 1911 | 25 September 1911 | All-Russian Hockey Union | Expelled shortly after joining. Federation dissolved and would not rejoin until 1952 as the Soviet Union. |
| Soviet Union | 1 April 1952 | 6 May 1992 | Soviet Union Ice Hockey Federation | Membership rights transferred to Russia. |
| West Germany | 10 March 1951 | 3 October 1990 | German Ice Hockey Federation | Reunification of East and West Germany, membership rights transferred to Germany. |
| Yugoslavia | 1 January 1939 | 31 December 1992 | Ice Hockey Federation of Yugoslavia | Membership rights transferred to Serbia (initially Serbia and Montenegro) after the breakup of Yugoslavia. |

== Bibliography ==
- Podnieks, Andrew, ed. (2010). IIHF Media Guide & Record Book 2011. Nordmark, Birger (contributing editor). Toronto: Moydart Press. ISBN 978-0-9867964-0-1.
