= Loan (sports) =

Terminology used in multiple sports

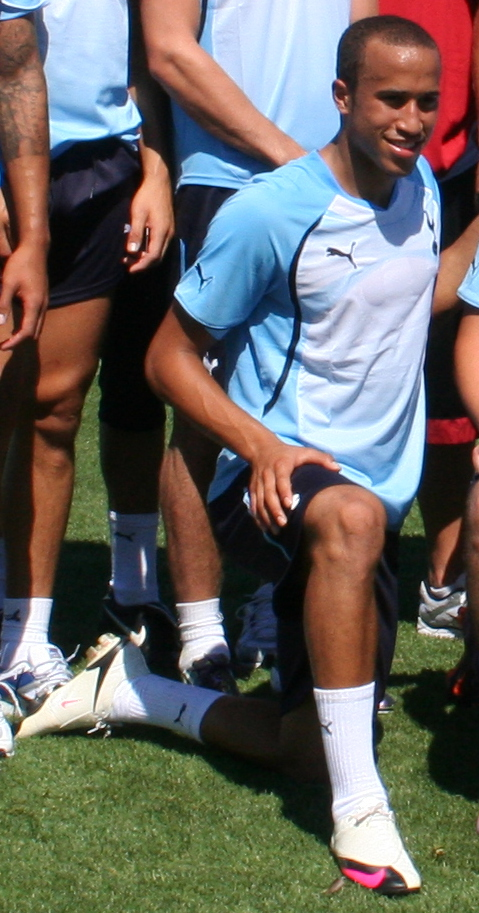
Andros Townsend was loaned by Tottenham Hotspur to nine separate clubs between the ages of 17 and 21, before breaking into the first team at his parent club.

In sports, a loan involves a particular player being able to temporarily play for a club other than the one to which they are currently contracted. Loan deals may last from a few weeks to a full season, sometimes persisting for multiple seasons at a time. A loan fee can be arranged by the parent club as well as them asking to pay a percentage of their wages.

== Association football ==
Players may be loaned out to other clubs for several reasons. Most commonly, young prospects will be loaned to a club in a lower league in order to gain first team experience. In such cases, the parent club may continue to pay the player's wages in full or in part. Some clubs put a formal arrangement in place with a feeder club for this purpose, such as Manchester United and Royal Antwerp, Arsenal and Beveren, or Chelsea and Vitesse. In other leagues such as Italy's Serie A, some smaller clubs have a reputation as a "farm club" and regularly take players, especially younger players, on loan from larger clubs.

A club may take a player on loan if they are short on transfer funds but can still pay wages, or as temporary cover for injuries or suspensions. The parent club might demand a fee or that the loaning club pays some or all of the player's wages during the loan period. A club might seek to loan out a squad player to make a saving on his wages, or a first team player to regain match fitness following an injury.

A loan may be made to get around a transfer window. Such a loan might include an agreed fee for a permanent transfer when the next transfer window opens. Some players are loaned because they are unhappy or in dispute with their current club and no other club wishes to buy them permanently.

In the Premier League, players on loan are not permitted to play against the team which holds their registration (section 7.2 of rule M.6). Loanees are, however, allowed to play against their 'owning' clubs in cup competitions should they get permission, unless they are cup-tied (i.e. have played for their owning club in that cup during that season).

=== Unpaid trialists ===
In the Scottish Professional Football League (and previously the Scottish Football League), clubs are permitted to take players on as unpaid trialists even for competitive fixtures. Sometimes for the first two weeks of a trial period player' names are obscured; match reports use the convention "A Trialist" to refer to such players in lieu of using their real names.

== Rugby league ==
Player loans occur in rugby league for similar reasons to soccer. In the United Kingdom, the Rugby Football League (RFL) stipulate that loans must last for at least 28 days. There is no bar against a player playing for the loan club against the parent club unless this has been specified in the loan agreement. In Australia the National Rugby League (NRL) does not normally allow loans due to the feeder club arrangement but the COVID-19 pandemic forced a review of the situation and in 2020 loans were allowed.

=== Guest appearances ===
In the First World War the RFL relaxed player registration rules to allow players to play for clubs close to their military base or workplace. Confusion could arise; in 1917 Billy Batten was working near to Dewsbury so Dewsbury selected him to play against his registered club, Hull FC. Hull had also selected Batten to play in the same game. On this occasion, Batten chose to play for Dewsbury. During the Second World War the RFL allowed players to play as guests for another club on a match by match basis as long as the owning club agreed to the appearance. The system also allowed players whose club had suspended operations to play while still being registered to the original club Clubs made full use of the guest system; in the 1940–41 Championship final between Wigan and Bradford, Wigan featured guest players from Liverpool Stanley, Salford and Hull Kingston Rovers while Bradford included guests from Salford and Leeds.

== Ice hockey ==
The International Ice Hockey Federation's International Transfer Regulations serve as guidelines all player transfers, including loans, between member national associations and their leagues. Loans between associations, where a player temporarily joins a club in another member association, are classified as limited transfers, meaning the player's playing rights are restricted to that association for a defined period.

=== NHL ===
The highest level of professional play for ice hockey is considered to be the National Hockey League (NHL) of United States and Canada. As with other major North American sports, the NHL is a closed league without promotion and relegation and utilizes a system of minor league farm teams to develop players. Loans in ice hockey, subsequently, tend to be either formalized short-term reassignments of NHL players to either a team's minor league affiliate or a longer-term reassignment to an unaffiliated club outside of North America, most commonly to a European team.

NHL teams are permitted to loan players to teams outside of North America. The terms of the loan, including the receiving team, duration of loan, and salary responsibility to the player, are determined on case-by-case basis for each individual.

==== Conditioning loan ====
An NHL team is permitted to temporarily loan a player to their American Hockey League (AHL) affiliate team without having to place the player on waivers, which may be normally be required to send the player to them on a more permanent basis; this is usually done with a player coming off an injury. Additionally, a player on a conditional loan is paid their NHL salary rate (rather than the lower rate paid if permanently assigned to a minor league club), the player counts towards the NHL roster limits and their team's salary cap. AHL teams are allowed to loan players down to the East Coast Hockey League (ECHL).

==== Tryouts ====
NHL teams and their affiliates are also allowed to temporarily receive amateur players to evaluate them while they are still members of other teams, usually either a junior ice hockey or college ice hockey teams. These players sign temporary Amateur Tryout (ATO) contracts that allow them to play for an NHL, AHL, or ECHL team without pay (as to not jeopardize their amateur status), though the rules vary on their usage. The NHL primarily uses ATOs for its emergency back–up goaltender (EBUG) rule and only last for a single game. The AHL and ECHL allow for longer term tryouts.

== See also ==
- Free transfer
- Rugby League Dual registration
