= National Hockey League =

North American professional ice hockey league

National Hockey League Ligue nationale de hockey
- Current season, competition or edition: 2026–27 NHL season
- Sport: Ice hockey
- Founded: November 26, 1917 (108 years ago), Montreal, Quebec, Canada
- First season: 1917–18
- Commissioner: Gary Bettman
- No. of teams: 32
- Countries: Canada (7 teams); United States (25 teams)
- Headquarters: New York City, New York, U.S.
- Most recent champions: Carolina Hurricanes (2nd title)
- Most titles: Montreal Canadiens (25 titles) (Note: While the Montreal Canadiens have won 24 Stanley Cups, this does not equal their number of NHL championships, as the Stanley Cup predates the NHL and was an inter-league championship prior to 1926. The Canadiens won a Stanley Cup championship in 1916 as a member of the National Hockey Association, and 23 Cups as a member of the NHL. Montreal also won the NHL championship twice without winning the Stanley Cup: in 1918–19 when the Spanish flu caused the cancellation of the Stanley Cup Final against the Seattle Metropolitans of Pacific Coast Hockey Association and in 1924–25 when they lost in the Stanley Cup Final to the Western Canada Hockey League's Victoria Cougars.)
- Broadcasters: Canada: Sportsnet/TVA; United States: ABC/ESPN; TNT/TBS; NHL Network; International: See list
- Streaming partners: Canada: Sportsnet+; Amazon Prime Video; United States: ESPN+/Hulu; HBO Max
- Website: www.nhl.com

The National Hockey League (NHL; French: Ligue nationale de hockey [liɡ nasjɔnal də ɔkɛ], LNH) is a professional ice hockey league in North America composed of 32 teams, 25 in the United States and 7 in Canada. The NHL is one of the major professional sports leagues in the United States and Canada and is considered the premier ice hockey league in the world. The Stanley Cup, the oldest professional sports trophy in North America, is awarded annually to the league playoff champion at the end of each season. The International Ice Hockey Federation (IIHF) views the Stanley Cup as one of the "most important championships available to the sport". The league's headquarters have been in New York City since 1989, when it moved from Montreal; the league also has offices in Toronto and Montreal.

The NHL was organized at the Windsor Hotel in Montreal on November 26, 1917, after the suspension of operations of its predecessor organization, the National Hockey Association (NHA), which had been founded in 1909 at Renfrew, Ontario. The NHL immediately took the NHA's place as one of the leagues that contested for the Stanley Cup in an annual interleague competition, before a series of league mergers and foldings left the NHL as the only league competing for the Stanley Cup in 1926.

At its inception, the NHL had four teams, all in Canada, thus the adjective "National" in the league's name. The league expanded to the United States in 1924, when the Boston Bruins joined, and has since consisted of both American and Canadian teams. From 1942 to 1967, the NHL had only six teams, collectively nicknamed the "Original Six". The league added six new teams to double its size as a result of the 1967 NHL expansion, then increased to 18 teams by 1974, and to 21 teams due to the 1979 NHL expansion. Between 1991 and 2000, the NHL further expanded to 30 teams. It added its 31st and 32nd teams in 2017 and 2021. Salt Lake City was awarded an expansion franchise in 2024; it acquired the hockey assets of the Arizona Coyotes, which were deactivated, and established the Utah Hockey Club (now the Utah Mammoth), thus maintaining the total number of teams at 32.

The NHL is the fifth-highest grossing professional sports league in the world by revenue. There have been four league-wide work stoppages in NHL history, all occurring since 1992. As of the 2024–25 season, the NHL had players from 18 countries.

The league's regular season is typically held from October to April, with each team playing 82 games. Following the conclusion of the regular season, 16 teams advance to the Stanley Cup playoffs, a four-round tournament that runs into June to determine the league champion. Since the league's founding in 1917, the Montreal Canadiens have won the most NHL titles with 25, winning three NHL championship series before the league took full exclusivity of the Stanley Cup in 1926, and 22 Stanley Cups afterwards. The reigning league champions are the Carolina Hurricanes, who defeated the Vegas Golden Knights in the 2026 Stanley Cup Final.

== History ==
=== Early years ===
The National Hockey League (NHL) was established in 1917 as the successor to the National Hockey Association (NHA). Founded in 1909, the NHA began play in 1910 with seven teams in Ontario and Quebec, and was one of the first major leagues in professional ice hockey. However, by its eighth season, a series of disputes with Toronto Blueshirts owner Eddie Livingstone led team owners of the Montreal Canadiens, the Montreal Wanderers, the Ottawa Senators, and the Quebec Bulldogs to hold a meeting to discuss the league's future. Realizing the NHA constitution left them unable to force Livingstone out, the four teams voted instead to suspend the NHA, and, on November 26, 1917, formed the National Hockey League. Frank Calder was chosen as the NHL's first president, serving until his death in 1943.

The Bulldogs were unable to play in the NHL, and the remaining owners founded the Toronto Arenas to compete with the Canadiens, Wanderers and Senators. The first games were played on December 19, 1917. The Montreal Arena burned down in January 1918, causing the Wanderers to cease operations, and the NHL continued on as a three-team league until the Bulldogs returned in 1919.

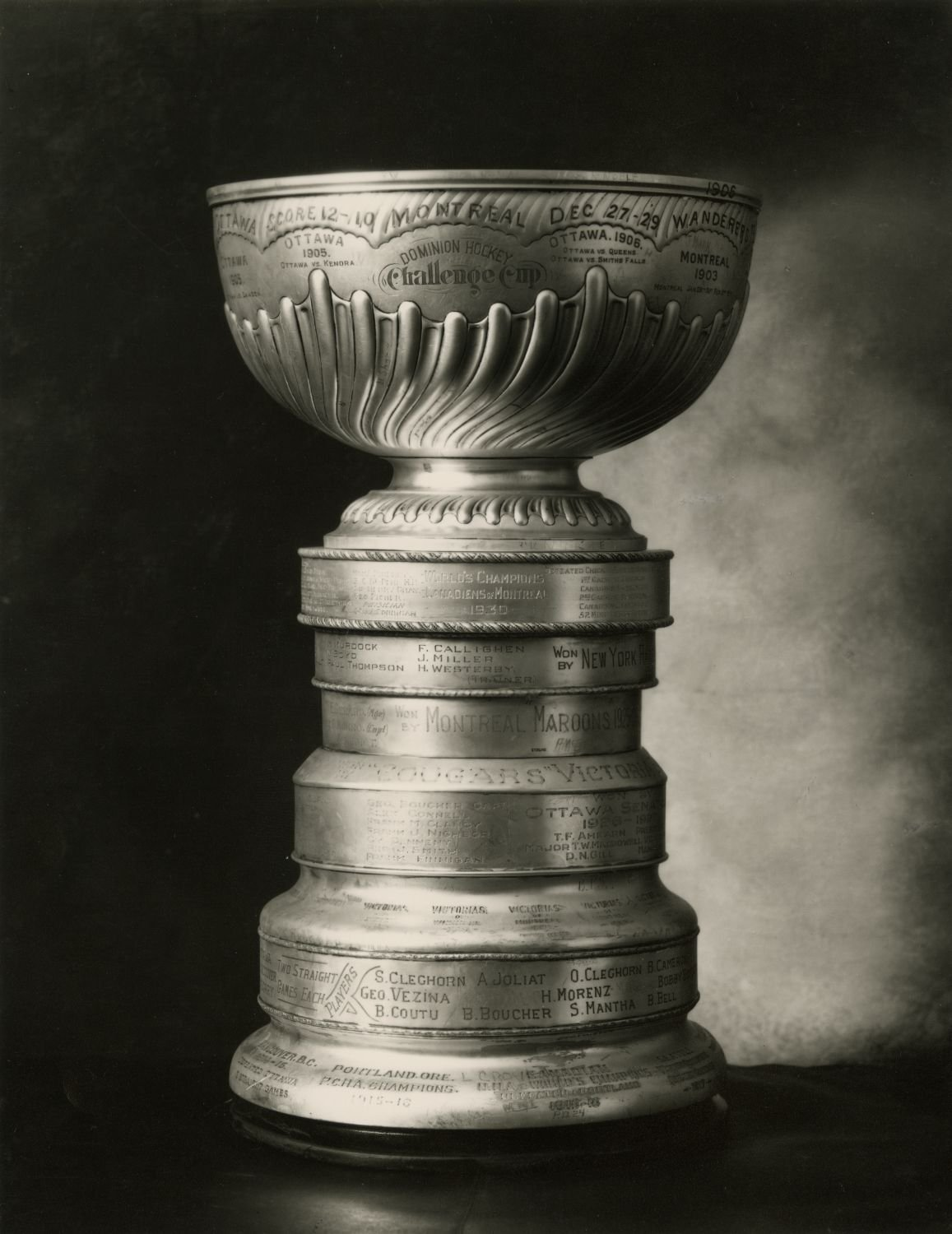
The Stanley Cup in 1930, several years after it became the de facto championship trophy for the NHL

The NHL replaced the NHA as one of the leagues that competed for the Stanley Cup, an interleague competition at the time. Toronto won the first NHL title, and then defeated the Vancouver Millionaires of the Pacific Coast Hockey Association (PCHA) for the 1918 Stanley Cup. The Canadiens won the league title in 1919, but the series in the Stanley Cup Final against the PCHA's Seattle Metropolitans was abandoned due to the Spanish Flu epidemic. In 1924, Montreal won their first Stanley Cup as a member of the NHL. The Hamilton Tigers won the regular season title in 1924–25, but refused to play in the championship series unless they were given a C$200 bonus. The league refused and declared the Canadiens the league champion after they defeated the Toronto St. Patricks (formerly the Arenas) in the two-game, total-goals NHL championship series. Montreal was then defeated by the Victoria Cougars of the Western Canada Hockey League (WCHL) in 1925. It was the last time a non-NHL team won the trophy, as the Stanley Cup became the de facto NHL championship in 1926, after the WCHL ceased operation.

The NHL embarked on a rapid expansion in the 1920s, adding the Montreal Maroons and the Boston Bruins in 1924, the latter being the first American team to join the league. The New York Americans began play in 1925 after purchasing the assets of the Hamilton Tigers, and they were joined by the Pittsburgh Pirates. The New York Rangers were added in 1926, and the Chicago Black Hawks (later changed to Blackhawks) and Detroit Cougars (later known as the Red Wings) were added after the league purchased the assets of the defunct WCHL. A group purchased the Toronto St. Patricks in 1927 and renamed them the Toronto Maple Leafs.

In 1926, Native American Taffy Abel became the first non-white player in the NHL and broke the league's colour barrier by playing for the New York Rangers.

In 1934, the first NHL All-Star Game was held, to benefit Ace Bailey, whose career ended on a vicious hit by Eddie Shore. The second was held in 1937, in support of Howie Morenz's family when he died of a coronary embolism after breaking his leg during a game.

=== Original Six era ===
The Great Depression and the onset of World War II took a toll on the league. The Pirates became the Philadelphia Quakers in 1930, then folded a year later. The Senators likewise became the St. Louis Eagles in 1934, also lasting only a year. The Maroons did not survive, as they suspended operations in 1938. The Americans were suspended in 1942 due to a lack of available players, and they were never reactivated.

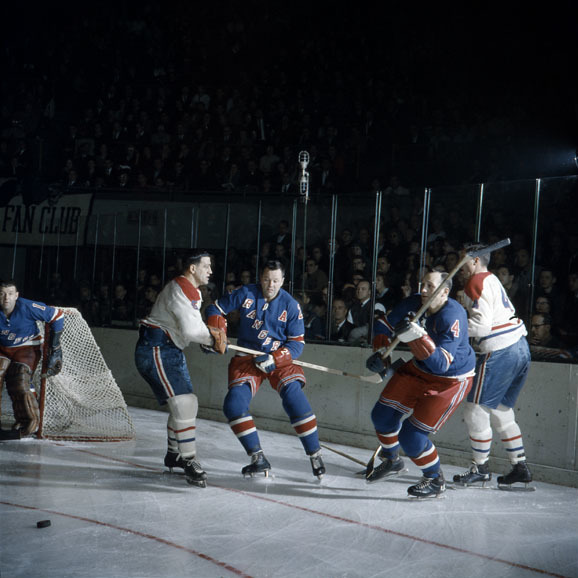
A game between the Montreal Canadiens and the New York Rangers in 1962

For the 1942–43 season, the NHL was reduced to six teams: the Boston Bruins, the Chicago Black Hawks, the Detroit Red Wings, the Montreal Canadiens, the New York Rangers, and the Toronto Maple Leafs, a line-up, often referred to as the "Original Six", that would remain constant for the next 25 years. In 1947, the league reached an agreement with the Stanley Cup trustees to take full control of the trophy, allowing it to reject challenges from other leagues that wished to play for the Cup.

In 1945, Maurice "Rocket" Richard became the first player to score 50 goals, doing so in a 50-game season. Richard later led the Canadiens to five consecutive titles between 1956 and 1960, a record no team has matched.

In 1948, Asian Canadian Larry Kwong became the first Asian player in the NHL by playing for the New York Rangers. In 1958, Willie O'Ree became the first black player in the league's history when he made his debut with the Boston Bruins.

=== Expansion era ===
By the mid-1960s, the desire for a network television contract in the United States, coupled with concerns that the Western Hockey League was planning to declare itself a major league and challenge for the Stanley Cup, spurred the NHL to undertake its first expansion since the 1920s. The league doubled in size to 12 teams for the 1967–68 season, adding the Los Angeles Kings, the Minnesota North Stars, the Philadelphia Flyers, the Pittsburgh Penguins, the California Seals, and the St. Louis Blues. However, Canadian fans were outraged that all six teams were placed in the United States, so the league responded by adding the Vancouver Canucks in 1970, along with the Buffalo Sabres, both located along the Canada–United States border. Two years later, the emergence of the newly founded World Hockey Association (WHA) led the league to add the New York Islanders and the Atlanta Flames to keep the rival league out of those markets. In 1974, the Washington Capitals and the Kansas City Scouts were added, bringing the league up to 18 teams.

NHL logo used from 1946 until 2005

The NHL fought the WHA for players, losing 67 to the new league in its first season of 1972–73, including the Chicago Black Hawks' Bobby Hull, who signed a 10-year, $2.5 million contract with the Winnipeg Jets, then the largest in hockey history. The league attempted to block the defections in court, but a counter-suit by the WHA led to a Philadelphia judge ruling the NHL's reserve clause to be illegal, thus eliminating the elder league's monopoly over the players. Wayne Gretzky played one season in the WHA for the Indianapolis Racers (eight games) and the Edmonton Oilers (72 games) before the Oilers joined the NHL for the 1979–80 season. Gretzky went on to lead the Oilers to win four Stanley Cup championships in 1984, 1985, 1987 and 1988, and set single-season records for goals (92 in 1981–82), assists (163 in 1985–86) and points (215 in 1985–86), as well as career records for goals (894), assists (1,963) and points (2,857). In 1988, he was traded to the Los Angeles Kings in a deal that dramatically improved the league's popularity in the United States. By the turn of the century, nine more teams were added to the NHL: the San Jose Sharks, the Tampa Bay Lightning, the Ottawa Senators, the Mighty Ducks of Anaheim, the Florida Panthers, the Nashville Predators, the Atlanta Thrashers, and, in 2000, the Minnesota Wild and the Columbus Blue Jackets. Also, in the mid to late 1990s, the Quebec Nordiques, original Winnipeg Jets, Hartford Whalers, and Minnesota North Stars relocated to Denver, Phoenix, Raleigh, and Dallas, respectively. In 2011, the Atlanta Thrashers relocated to Winnipeg, and the Winnipeg Jets were revived. On July 21, 2015, the NHL confirmed that it had received applications from prospective ownership groups in Quebec City and Las Vegas for possible expansion teams, and on June 22, 2016, NHL Commissioner Gary Bettman announced the addition of a 31st franchise, based in Las Vegas and later named the Vegas Golden Knights, into the NHL for the 2017–18 season. On December 4, 2018, the league announced a 32nd franchise in Seattle, later named the Seattle Kraken, which joined in the 2021–22 season. On April 18, 2024, the Arizona Coyotes suspended operations and sold their hockey assets, including players and other personnel, to a new team in Salt Lake City, Utah. Two months after Utah's foundation, the Coyotes ceased their efforts to re-activate within the five-year window granted to do so, bringing the NHL back to 32 franchises.

=== Labour issues ===
There have been four league-wide work stoppages in NHL history, all occurring since 1992. The first was an April 1992 strike by the National Hockey League Players' Association, which lasted for ten days but was settled quickly with all affected games rescheduled.

A lockout at the start of the 1994–95 season forced the league to reduce the schedule from 84 games to 48, with the teams playing only intra-conference games during the reduced season. The resulting collective bargaining agreement (CBA) was set for renegotiation in 1998, and extended to September 15, 2004.

With no new agreement in hand when the contract expired, league commissioner Gary Bettman announced a lockout of the players union and closed the league's head office for the 2004–05 season. The league vowed to install what it dubbed "cost certainty" for its teams, but the Players' Association countered that the move was little more than a euphemism for a salary cap, which the union initially said it would not accept. The lockout shut down the league for 310 days, making it the longest in sports history, as the NHL became the first professional sports league to lose an entire season. A new collective bargaining agreement was eventually ratified in July 2005, including a salary cap. The agreement had a term of six years with an option of extending the collective bargaining agreement for an additional year at the end of the term, allowing the league to resume as of the 2005–06 season.

On October 5, 2005, the first post-lockout season took to the ice with all 30 teams. The NHL received record attendance in the 2005–06 season, with an average of 16,955 per game. However, its television audience was slower to rebound due to American cable broadcaster ESPN's decision to drop its NHL coverage. The league's post-lockout agreement with NBC gave the league a share of revenue from each game's advertising sales, rather than the usual lump sum paid up front for game rights. The league's annual revenues were estimated at $2.27 billion.

On September 16, 2012, the labour pact expired, and the league again locked out the players. The owners proposed reducing the players' share of hockey-related revenues from 57 percent to 47 percent. All games were cancelled up to January 14, 2013, along with the 2013 NHL Winter Classic and the 2013 NHL All-Star Weekend. On January 6, a tentative agreement was reached on a 10-year deal. On January 12, the league and the Players' Association signed a memorandum of understanding on the new deal, allowing teams to begin their training camps the next day, with a shortened 48-game season schedule that began on January 19.

=== Player safety issues ===
Player safety has become a major issue in the NHL, with concussions resulting from a hard hit to the head being the primary concern. Recent studies have shown how the consequences of concussions can last beyond player retirement. This has significant effects on the league, as elite players have suffered from the aftereffects of concussions (such as Sidney Crosby being sidelined for approximately ten and a half months), which adversely affects the league's marketability. In December 2009, Brendan Shanahan was hired to replace Colin Campbell, and was given the role of senior vice-president of player safety. Shanahan began to hand out suspensions on high-profile perpetrators responsible for dangerous hits, such as Raffi Torres receiving 25 games for his hit on Marián Hossa.

To aid with removing high-speed collisions on icing, which had led to several potential career-ending injuries, such as to Hurricanes' defenceman Joni Pitkänen, the league mandated hybrid no-touch icing for the 2013–14 NHL season.

On November 25, 2013, ten former NHL players (Gary Leeman, Rick Vaive, Brad Aitken, Darren Banks, Curt Bennett, Richie Dunn, Warren Holmes, Bob Manno, Blair Stewart, and Morris Titanic) sued the league for negligence in protecting players from concussions. The suit came three months after the National Football League agreed to pay former players US$765 million due to a player safety lawsuit.

=== Women in the NHL ===
From 1952 to 1955, Marguerite Norris served as president of the Detroit Red Wings, being the first female NHL executive and the first woman to have her name engraved on the Stanley Cup. In 1992, Manon Rhéaume became the first woman to play a game in any of the major professional North American sports leagues, as a goaltender for the Tampa Bay Lightning in a preseason game against the St. Louis Blues, stopping seven of nine shots. In 2016, Dawn Braid was hired as the Arizona Coyotes' skating coach, making her the first female full-time coach in the NHL. The first female referees in the NHL were hired in a test-run during the league's preseason prospect tournaments in September 2019.

In 2016, the NHL hosted the 2016 Outdoor Women's Classic, an exhibition game between the Boston Pride of the National Women's Hockey League and Les Canadiennes of the Canadian Women's Hockey League, as part of the 2016 NHL Winter Classic weekend festivities. In 2019, the NHL invited four women from the US and Canadian Olympic teams to demonstrate the events in All-Star skills competition before the All-Star Game. Due to Nathan MacKinnon choosing not to participate following a bruised ankle, Team USA's Kendall Coyne Schofield competed in the Fastest Skater competition in his place, becoming the first woman to officially compete in the NHL's All-Star festivities. The attention led the NHL to include a 3-on-3 women's game before the 2020 All-Star Game. Rheaume returned to perform as a goaltender for the 2022 NHL All-Star Game's Breakaway Challenge.

== Teams ==
The NHL consists of 32 teams—25 based in the United States and 7 in Canada. The teams are divided evenly between the Eastern and Western conferences. Each conference is split into two divisions, with 16 teams per conference and 8 per division. The Eastern Conference consists of the Atlantic and Metropolitan divisions, while the Western Conference consists of the Central and Pacific divisions.

The number of teams held constant at 30 teams from the 2000–01 season, when the Minnesota Wild and the Columbus Blue Jackets joined the league as expansion teams, until 2017. That expansion capped a period in the 1990s of rapid expansion and relocation, when the NHL added nine teams to grow from 21 to 30 teams, and relocated four teams mostly from smaller, northern cities to larger, more southern metropolitan areas (Minneapolis–Saint Paul to Dallas, Quebec City to Denver, Winnipeg to Phoenix, and Hartford to Raleigh). The league has not contracted any teams since the Cleveland Barons were merged into the Minnesota North Stars in 1978. The league expanded for the first time in 17 years to 31 teams with the addition of the Vegas Golden Knights in 2017, then to 32 with the addition of the Seattle Kraken in 2021. In April 2024, a new expansion team in Utah was created, after Alex Meruelo sold the hockey assets of the Arizona Coyotes to Ryan Smith, owner of the Utah Jazz. Meruelo was granted until 2029 to secure an arena in Arizona in order to re-activate the team, bringing the total number of franchises up to 33; however, these efforts were abandoned two months later, leaving the NHL at 32 franchises once again.

According to Forbes, in 2025, the top three most valuable teams were part of the "Original Six":

1. Toronto Maple Leafs – US$4.4 billion
2. New York Rangers – US$4 billion
3. Montreal Canadiens – US$3.4 billion
4. Edmonton Oilers – US$3.2 billion
5. Los Angeles Kings – US$3.1 billion

The remaining members of the Original Six, the Boston Bruins, Chicago Blackhawks, and Detroit Red Wings ranked sixth, seventh, and tenth, respectively, at US$2.9 billion, US$2.8 billion, and US$2.5 billion. In 2023, the Maple Leafs surpassed the Rangers as the most valuable NHL team, and Los Angeles overtook both Chicago and Boston, making its way into the top five.

=== List of teams ===
Overview of NHL teams
Conference	Division	Team	City	Arena	Capacity	Founded	Joined	General manager	Head coach	Captain
Eastern	Atlantic	Boston Bruins	Boston, Massachusetts	TD Garden	17,850	1924		Don Sweeney	Marco Sturm	David Pastrňák
Eastern	Atlantic	Buffalo Sabres	Buffalo, New York	KeyBank Center	19,070	1970		Jarmo Kekäläinen	Lindy Ruff	Rasmus Dahlin
Eastern	Atlantic	Detroit Red Wings	Detroit, Michigan	Little Caesars Arena	19,515	1926		Shawn Horcoff	Todd McLellan	Vacant
Eastern	Atlantic	Florida Panthers	Sunrise, Florida	Amerant Bank Arena	19,250	1993		Bill Zito	Paul Maurice	Aleksander Barkov
Eastern	Atlantic	Montreal Canadiens	Montreal, Quebec	Bell Centre	20,962	1909	1917	Kent Hughes	Martin St. Louis	Nick Suzuki
Eastern	Atlantic	Ottawa Senators	Ottawa, Ontario	Canadian Tire Centre	18,655	1992		Steve Staios	Travis Green	Thomas Chabot
Eastern	Atlantic	Tampa Bay Lightning	Tampa, Florida	Benchmark International Arena	19,092	1992		Julien BriseBois	Jon Cooper	Victor Hedman
Eastern	Atlantic	Toronto Maple Leafs	Toronto, Ontario	Scotiabank Arena	18,800	1917		John Chayka	Jim Hiller	Auston Matthews
Eastern	Metropolitan	Carolina Hurricanes	Raleigh, North Carolina	Lenovo Center	18,700	1972	1979*	Eric Tulsky	Rod Brind'Amour	Jordan Staal
Eastern	Metropolitan	Columbus Blue Jackets	Columbus, Ohio	Nationwide Arena	18,500	2000		Don Waddell	Rick Bowness	Vacant
Eastern	Metropolitan	New Jersey Devils	Newark, New Jersey	Prudential Center	16,514	1974*		Sunny Mehta	Sheldon Keefe	Nico Hischier
Eastern	Metropolitan	New York Islanders	Elmont, New York	UBS Arena	17,255	1972		Mathieu Darche	Peter DeBoer	Bo Horvat
Eastern	Metropolitan	New York Rangers	New York, New York	Madison Square Garden	18,006	1926		Chris Drury	Mike Sullivan	J.T. Miller
Eastern	Metropolitan	Philadelphia Flyers	Philadelphia, Pennsylvania	Xfinity Mobile Arena	19,173	1967		Daniel Brière	Rick Tocchet	Sean Couturier
Eastern	Metropolitan	Pittsburgh Penguins	Pittsburgh, Pennsylvania	PPG Paints Arena	18,187	1967		Kyle Dubas	Dan Muse	Sidney Crosby
Eastern	Metropolitan	Washington Capitals	Washington, D.C.	Capital One Arena	18,573	1974		Chris Patrick	Spencer Carbery	Alexander Ovechkin
Western	Central	Chicago Blackhawks	Chicago, Illinois	United Center	19,717	1926		Kyle Davidson	Jeff Blashill	Connor Bedard
Western	Central	Colorado Avalanche	Denver, Colorado	Ball Arena	18,007	1972	1979*	Joe Sakic	Jared Bednar	Gabriel Landeskog
Western	Central	Dallas Stars	Dallas, Texas	American Airlines Center	18,532	1967*		Jim Nill	Glen Gulutzan	Jamie Benn
Western	Central	Minnesota Wild	Saint Paul, Minnesota	Grand Casino Arena	17,954	2000		Bill Guerin	John Hynes	Jared Spurgeon
Western	Central	Nashville Predators	Nashville, Tennessee	Bridgestone Arena	17,159	1998		Chris MacFarland	Andrew Brunette	Roman Josi
Western	Central	St. Louis Blues	St. Louis, Missouri	Enterprise Center	18,096	1967		Alexander Steen	Jim Montgomery	Robert Thomas
Western	Central	Utah Mammoth	Salt Lake City, Utah	Delta Center	16,020	2024		Bill Armstrong	André Tourigny	Clayton Keller
Western	Central	Winnipeg Jets	Winnipeg, Manitoba	Canada Life Centre	15,225	1972	1979*	Kevin Cheveldayoff	Scott Arniel	Adam Lowry
Western	Pacific	Anaheim Ducks	Anaheim, California	Honda Center	17,174	1993		Pat Verbeek	Joel Quenneville	Mikael Granlund
Western	Pacific	Calgary Flames	Calgary, Alberta	Scotiabank Saddledome	19,289	1972*		Craig Conroy	Ryan Huska	Mikael Backlund
Western	Pacific	Edmonton Oilers	Edmonton, Alberta	Rogers Place	18,347	1972	1979	Stan Bowman	Mike Babcock	Connor McDavid
Western	Pacific	Los Angeles Kings	Los Angeles, California	Crypto.com Arena	18,145	1967		Ken Holland	Peter Laviolette	Drew Doughty
Western	Pacific	San Jose Sharks	San Jose, California	SAP Center	17,435	1991		Mike Grier	Ryan Warsofsky	Macklin Celebrini
Western	Pacific	Seattle Kraken	Seattle, Washington	Climate Pledge Arena	17,151	2021		Jason Botterill	Lane Lambert	Jordan Eberle
Western	Pacific	Vancouver Canucks	Vancouver, British Columbia	Rogers Arena	18,910	1945	1970	Ryan Johnson	Manny Malhotra	Vacant
Western	Pacific	Vegas Golden Knights	Paradise, Nevada	T-Mobile Arena	17,500	2017		Kelly McCrimmon	Ryan Craig	Mark Stone

Notes:

1. An asterisk (*) denotes a franchise move. See the individual team articles for more information.
2. The Edmonton Oilers, Hartford Whalers (now Carolina Hurricanes), Quebec Nordiques (now Colorado Avalanche), and Winnipeg Jets all joined the NHL in 1979 as part of the NHL–WHA merger.

== Organizational structure ==
=== Board of Governors ===
The Board of Governors is the ruling and governing body of the NHL. In this context, each team is a member of the league, and each member appoints a Governor (usually the owner of the club), and two alternates to the Board. The current chairman of the Board is Washington Capitals owner Ted Leonsis. The Board of Governors exists to establish the policies of the league and to uphold its constitution. Some of the responsibilities of the Board of Governors include:

- review and approve any changes to the league's rules.
- hiring and firing of the commissioner.
- review and approve the purchase, sale or relocation of any member club.
- review and approve the salary caps for member clubs.
- review and approve any changes to the structure of the game schedule.

The Board of Governors meets twice per year, in the months of June and December, with the exact date and place to be fixed by the Commissioner.

=== Executives ===
The chief executive of the league is commissioner Gary Bettman. Some other senior executives include deputy commissioner and chief legal officer Bill Daly, director of hockey operations Colin Campbell, and senior vice president of player safety George Parros. A committee led by Bettman and chairman Jeremy Jacobs is responsible for vetting new ownership applications, collective bargaining, and league expansion. Other members include Mark Chipman, N. Murray Edwards, Craig Leipold, Ted Leonsis, Geoff Molson, Henry Samueli, Larry Tanenbaum, Jeff Vinik, and David Blitzer.

== Rules ==
The current markings of an NHL hockey rink

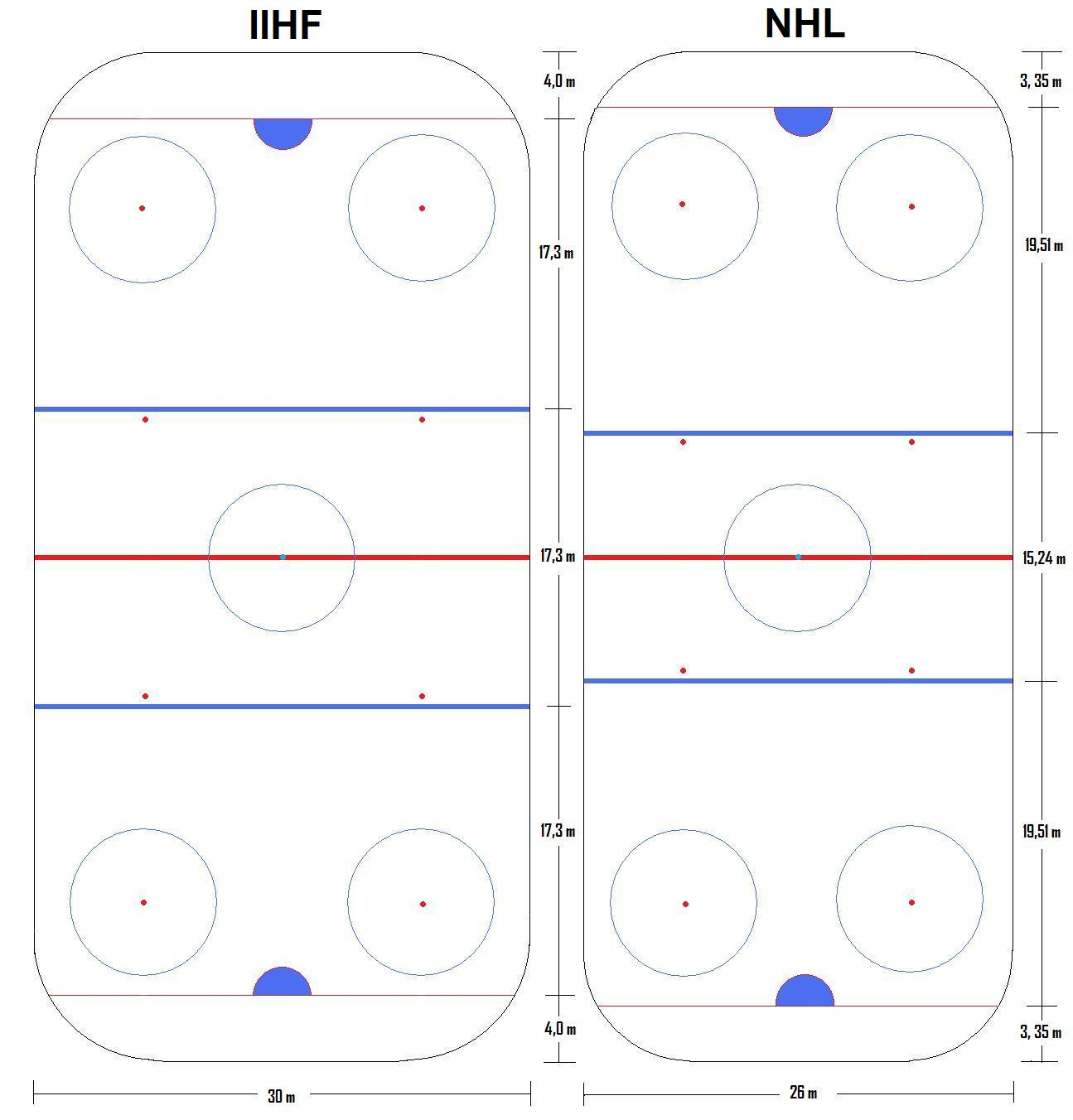
Size difference between a hockey rink used in IIHF-sanctioned games and an NHL hockey rink

The NHL's rules are one of the two standard sets of professional ice hockey rules in the world, the other being the rules of the International Ice Hockey Federation (IIHF), as used in tournaments such as the Olympics. The IIHF rules are derived from the Canadian amateur ice hockey rules of the early 20th century, while the NHL rules evolved directly from the first organized indoor ice hockey game in Montreal in 1875, updated by subsequent leagues up to 1917, when the NHL adopted the existing NHA set of rules. The NHL's rules are the basis for rules governing most professional and major junior ice hockey leagues in North America.

The NHL hockey rink is 200 by 85 feet (60.96 m × 25.91 m), approximately the same length but much narrower than IIHF standards. A trapezoidal area appears behind each goal net. The goaltender can play the puck only within the trapezoid or in front of the goal line; if the goaltender plays the puck behind the goal line and outside the trapezoidal area, a two-minute minor penalty for delay of game is assessed. The rule is unofficially nicknamed the "Martin Brodeur rule"; Brodeur at the time was one of the best goaltenders at getting behind the net to handle the puck. Since the 2013–14 season, the league trimmed the goal frames by 4 inches (10 cm) on each side and reduced the size of the goalies' leg pads.

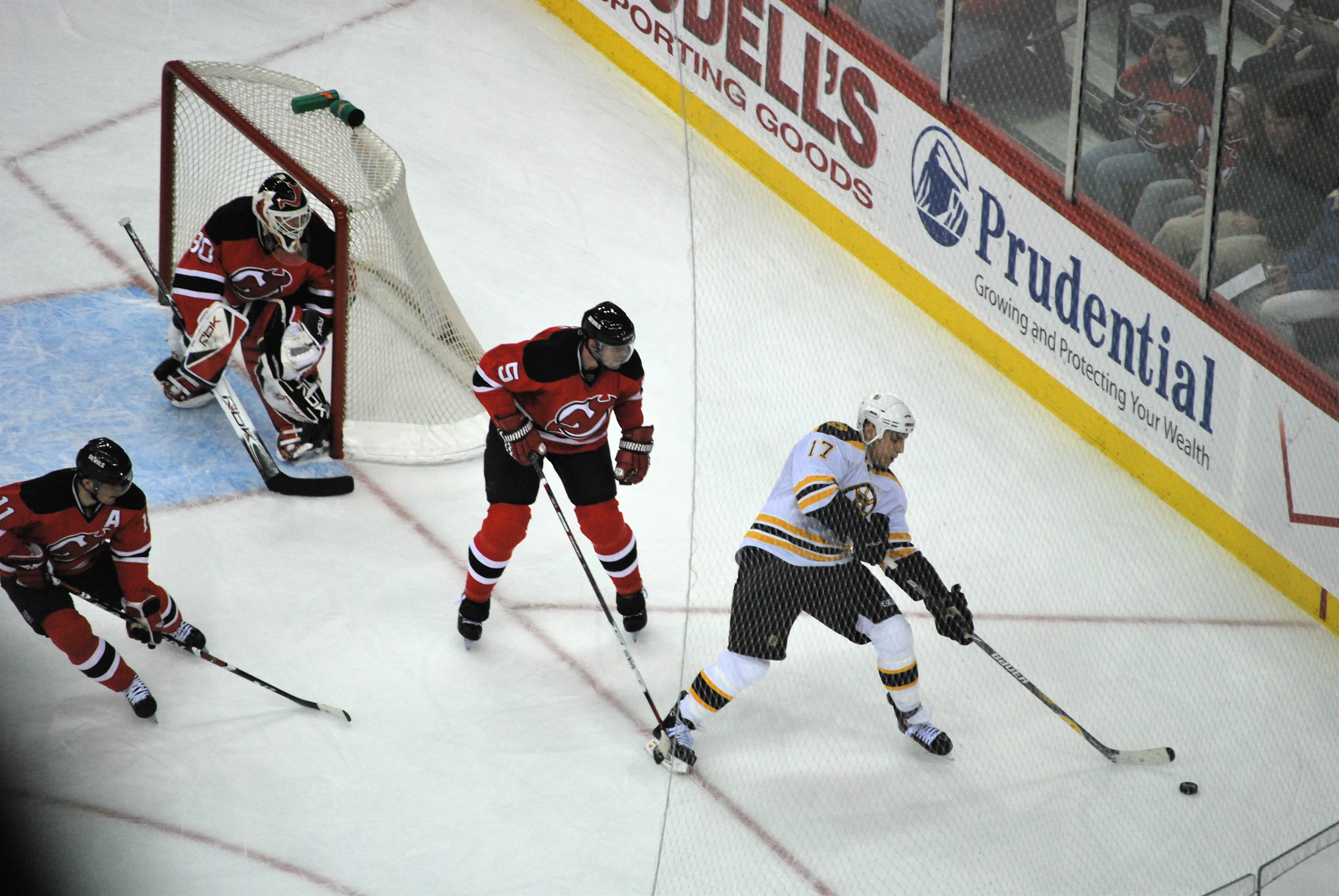
New Jersey Devils goaltender Martin Brodeur (top left) positions himself along the net during a 2008 game against the Boston Bruins. Brodeur's exploits led the NHL in 2005 to delineate the trapezoidal area behind the net to limit where the goaltender can legally play the puck behind the goal line.

The league has regularly modified its rules to counter perceived imperfections in the game. The penalty shot was adopted from the Pacific Coast Hockey Association to ensure players were not being blocked from opportunities to score. For the 2005–06 season, the league changed some of the rules regarding being offside. First, the league removed the "offside pass" or "two-line pass" rule, which required a stoppage in play if a pass originating from inside a team's defending zone was completed on the offensive side of the centre line, unless the puck crossed the line before the player. Furthermore, the league reinstated the "tag-up offside" which allows an attacking player a chance to get back onside by returning to the neutral zone. The changes to the offside rule were among several rule changes intended to increase overall scoring, which had been in decline since the expansion years of the mid-nineties and the increased prevalence of the neutral zone trap. Since 2005, when a team is guilty of icing the puck they are not allowed to make a line change or skater substitution of any sort before the following face-off (except to replace an injured player or re-install a pulled goaltender). Since 2013, the league has used hybrid icing, where a linesman stops play due to icing if a defending player (other than the goaltender) crosses the imaginary line that connects the two face-off dots in their defensive zone before an attacking player is able to. This was done to counter a trend of player injury in races to the puck.

Fighting in the NHL leads to major penalties while IIHF rules, and most amateur rules, call for the ejection of fighting players. Usually, a penalized team cannot replace a player that is penalized on the ice and is thus short-handed for the duration of the penalty, but if the penalties are coincidental, for example when two players fight, both teams remain at full strength. Also, unlike minor penalties, major penalties must be served to their full completion, regardless of number of goals scored during the power play.

The league also imposes a conduct policy on its players. Players are banned from gambling and criminal activities have led to the suspension of players. The league and the Players' Association agreed to a stringent anti-doping policy in the 2005 collective bargaining agreement. The policy provides for a twenty-game suspension for a first positive test, a sixty-game suspension for a second positive test, and a lifetime suspension for a third positive test.

At the end of regulation time, the team with the most goals wins the game. If a game is tied after regulation time, overtime ensues. During the regular season, overtime is a five-minute, three-on-three sudden-death period, in which whoever scores a goal first wins the game. If the game is still tied at the end of overtime, the game enters a shootout. Three players for each team in turn take a penalty shot. The team with the most goals during the three-round shootout wins the game. If the game is still tied after the three shootout rounds, the shootout continues but becomes sudden-death. Whichever team ultimately wins the shootout is awarded a goal in the game score and thus awarded two points in the standings. The losing team in overtime or shootout is awarded one point. Shootout goals and saves are not tracked in hockey statistics; shootout statistics are tracked separately.

There are no shootouts during the playoffs. Instead, multiple sudden-death, 20-minute five-on-five periods are played until one team scores. Two games have reached six overtime periods, but none have gone beyond six. During playoff overtime periods, the only break is to clean the loose ice at the first stoppage after the period is halfway finished.

== Season structure ==
The National Hockey League season is divided into a preseason (September and early October), a regular season (from early October through early to mid-April) and a postseason (the Stanley Cup playoffs) that runs until June.

Teams usually hold a summer showcase for prospects in July and participate in prospect tournaments, full games that do not feature any veterans, in September. Full training camps begin in mid-to-late September, including a preseason consisting of six to eight exhibition games. Split squad games, in which parts of a team's regular season roster play separate games on the same day, are occasionally played during the preseason.

During the regular season, clubs play each other in a predefined schedule. For the 2026–27 season the season was extended from 82 to 84 games. Each team plays four games against the other teams in its division (a total of 28 games). Each team also plays all non-divisional teams in their own conference three times (24 games). The remaining games of the season are inter-conference play (32 games), allowing every team in the league to play every other team twice. The schedule is structured so that every NHL team plays in every arena at least once per season, which also include regular season games played outside North America and games played in outdoor stadiums.

The league's regular season standings are based on a point system. Two points are awarded for a win, one point for losing in overtime or a shootout, and zero points for a loss in regulation. At the end of the regular season, the team that finishes with the most points in each division is crowned the division champion, and the league's overall leader is awarded the Presidents' Trophy.

The Stanley Cup playoffs, which go from April to the beginning of June, are an elimination tournament where two teams play against each other to win a best-of-seven series in order to advance to the next round. The final remaining team is crowned the Stanley Cup champion. Eight teams from each conference qualify for the playoffs: the top three teams in each division plus the two conference teams with the next highest number of points. The two conference champions proceed to the Stanley Cup Final. In all rounds, the higher-ranked team is awarded home-ice advantage, with four of the seven games played at this team's home venue. In the Stanley Cup Final, the team with the most points during the regular season has home-ice advantage.

== Entry draft ==
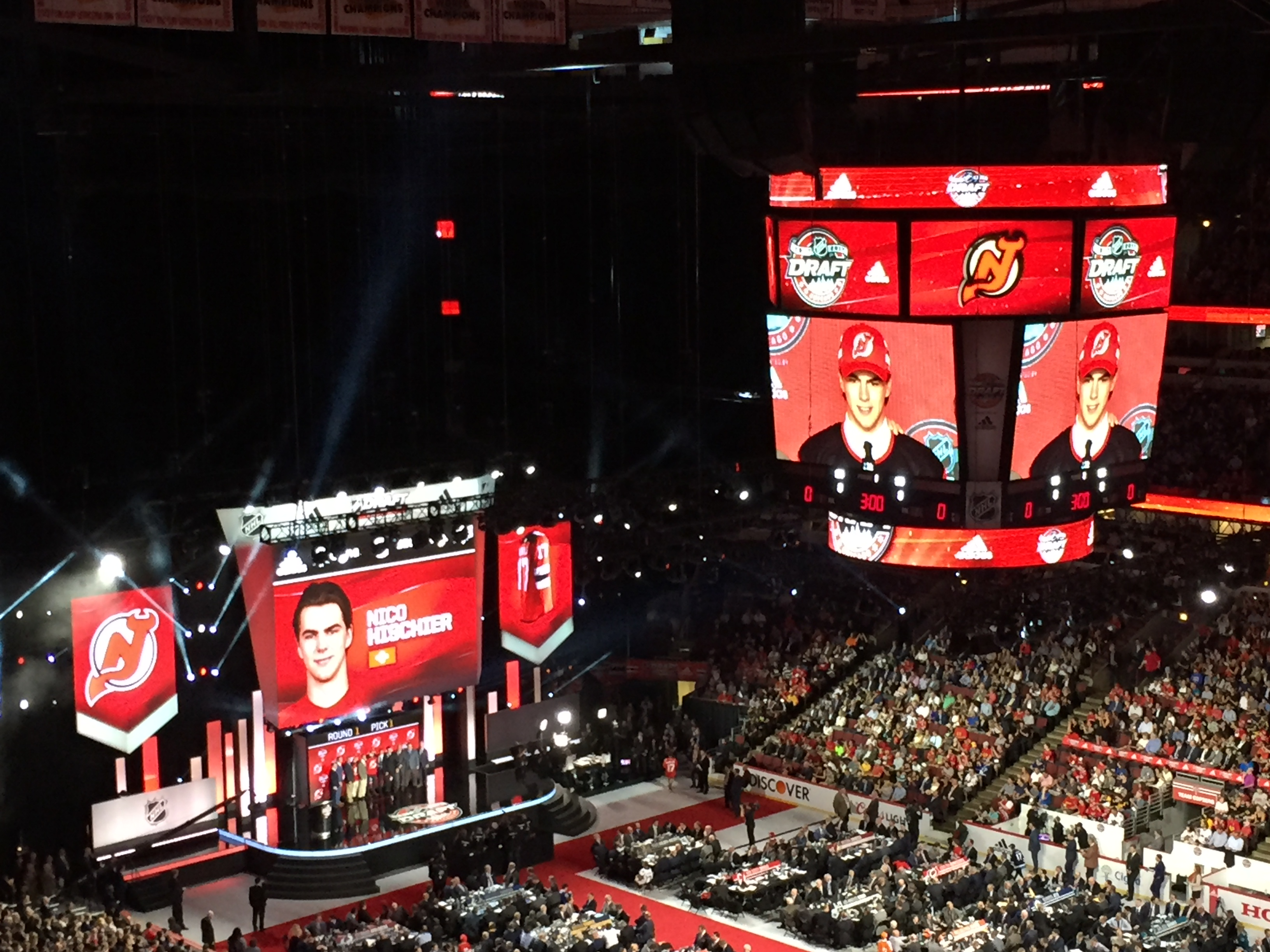
The 2017 NHL entry draft

The annual NHL entry draft consists of a seven-round off-season draft held in June on a date of the commissioner's choosing. Early NHL drafts took place at the Queen Elizabeth (currently Fairmont) Hotel in Montreal. Amateur players from junior, collegiate, or European leagues are eligible to enter the entry draft. The selection order is determined by a combination of the standings at the end of the regular season, playoff results, and a draft lottery. The 16 teams that did not qualify for the playoffs are entered in a weighted lottery to determine the initial draft picks in the first round, with the last place team having the best chance of winning the lottery. Once the lottery determines the initial draft picks, the order for the remaining non-playoff teams is determined by the standings at the end of the regular season. For those teams that did qualify for the playoffs, the draft order is then determined by total regular season points for non-division winners that are eliminated in the first two rounds of the playoffs, then any division winners that failed to reach the Conference Finals. Conference finalists receive the 29th and 30th picks depending on total points, with the Stanley Cup runner-up given the 31st pick and the Stanley Cup champions the final pick.

== Trophies and awards ==
=== Teams ===
Stanley Cup championships Defunct teams not included.
Team	Titles
Montreal Canadiens	24*
Toronto Maple Leafs	13
Detroit Red Wings	11
Boston Bruins	6
Chicago Blackhawks	6
Edmonton Oilers	5
Pittsburgh Penguins	5
New York Islanders	4
New York Rangers	4
Colorado Avalanche	3
New Jersey Devils	3
Tampa Bay Lightning	3
Carolina Hurricanes	2
Florida Panthers	2
Los Angeles Kings	2
Philadelphia Flyers	2
Anaheim Ducks	1
Calgary Flames	1
Dallas Stars	1
St. Louis Blues	1
Vegas Golden Knights	1
Washington Capitals	1
* Includes one pre-NHL championship. Further information: List of Stanley Cup champions

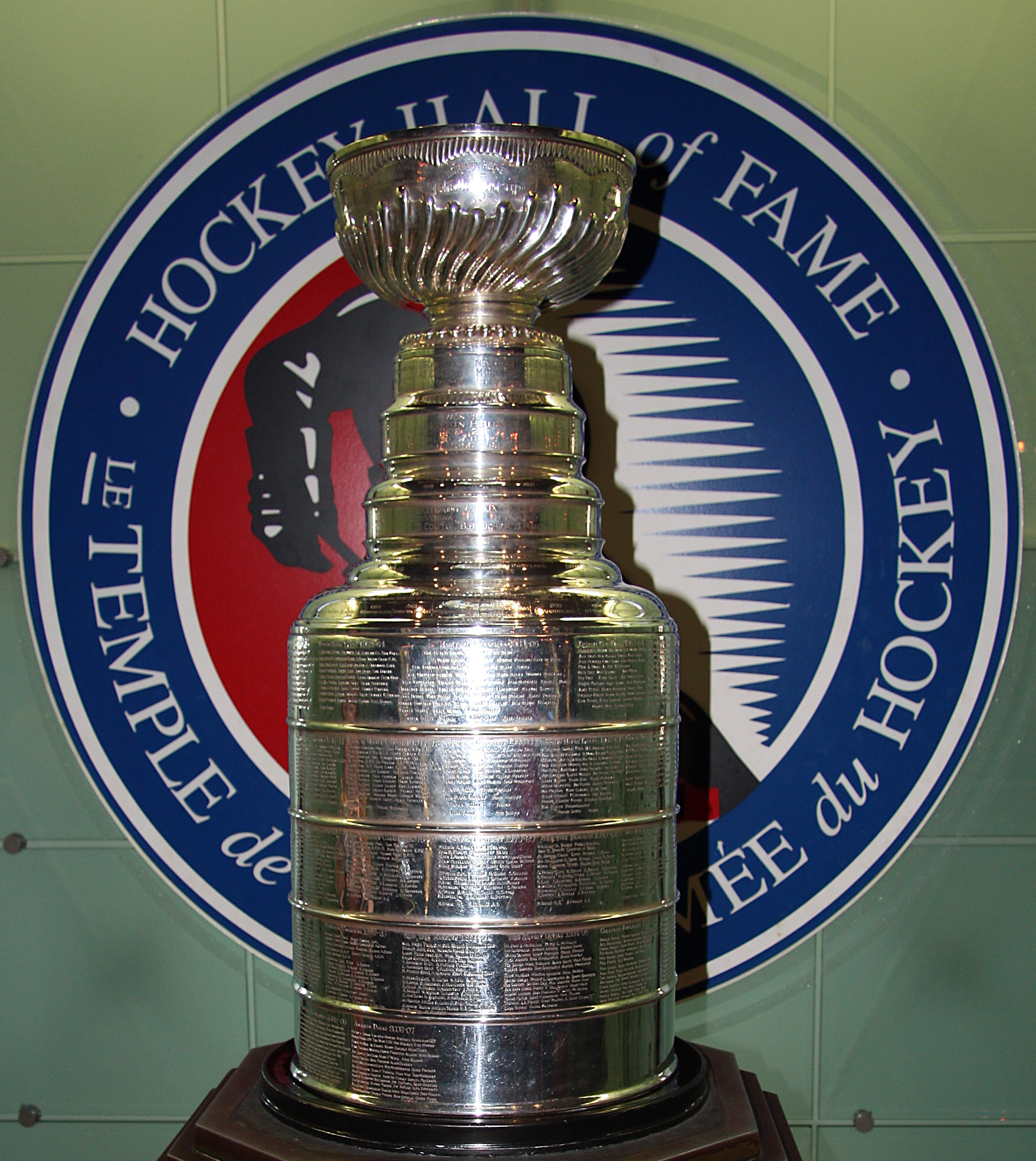
The Stanley Cup, shown here on display at the Hockey Hall of Fame, is awarded annually to the league champion.

The most prestigious team award is the Stanley Cup, which is awarded to the league champion at the end of the Stanley Cup playoffs. The team that has the most points in the regular season is awarded the Presidents' Trophy.

The Montreal Canadiens are the most successful franchise in the league. Since the formation of the league in 1917, they have 25 NHL championships (three between 1917 and 1925 when the Stanley Cup was still contested in an interleague competition, twenty-two since 1926 after the Stanley Cup became the NHL's championship trophy). They also lead all teams with 24 Stanley Cup championships (one as an NHA team, twenty-three as an NHL team). Of the four major professional sports leagues in North America, the Montreal Canadiens are surpassed in the number of championships only by the New York Yankees of Major League Baseball, who have three more.

The longest streak of winning the Stanley Cup in consecutive years is five, held by the Montreal Canadiens from 1955–56 to 1959–60. The 1977 edition of the Montreal Canadiens, the second of four straight Stanley Cup champions, was named by ESPN as the second greatest sports team of all time.

The next most successful NHL franchise is the Toronto Maple Leafs with 13 Stanley Cup championships, most recently in 1967. The Detroit Red Wings, with 11 Stanley Cup championships, are the most successful American franchise.

The same trophy is reused every year for each of its awards. The Stanley Cup, much like its counterpart in the Canadian Football League (CFL), is unique in this aspect, as opposed to the Vince Lombardi Trophy, Larry O'Brien Trophy, and Commissioner's Trophy, which have new ones made every year for that year's champion. Despite only one trophy being used, the names of the teams winning and the players are engraved every year on the Stanley Cup. The same can also be said for the other trophies reissued every year.

==== Division titles ====
Apart from the NHL-sanctioned trophies, which teams often recognize by putting up banners in the rafters of their arenas, many teams also claim titles which are not represented by trophies, often also by putting up banners in their rafters. One example is the division title or division championship. The term unambiguously refers to the team that received the most points in its division at the end of the regular season, but in some previous seasons, for example, from 1926–27 to 1927–28 and from 1981–82 to 1992–93, when the playoffs where organized along divisions, the term without qualification could also refer to the team which won the corresponding playoff series. The NHL has made clear in the past that it only allows teams to recognize regular season division titles.

=== Players ===
There are numerous trophies that are awarded to players based on their statistics during the regular season; they include, among others, the Art Ross Trophy for the league scoring champion (goals and assists), the Maurice "Rocket" Richard Trophy for the goal-scoring leader, and the William M. Jennings Trophy for the goaltender(s) for the team with the fewest goals against them.

The other player trophies are voted on by the Professional Hockey Writers' Association or the team general managers. These individual awards are presented at a formal ceremony held in late June after the playoffs have concluded. The most prestigious individual award is the Hart Memorial Trophy which is awarded annually to the Most Valuable Player; the voting is conducted by members of the Professional Hockey Writers Association to judge the player who is the most valuable to his team during the regular season. The Vezina Trophy is awarded annually to the person deemed the best goaltender as voted on by the general managers of the teams in the NHL. The James Norris Memorial Trophy is awarded annually to the National Hockey League's top defenceman, the Calder Memorial Trophy is awarded annually to the top rookie, and the Lady Byng Memorial Trophy is awarded to the player deemed to combine the highest degree of skill and sportsmanship; all three of these awards are voted on by members of the Professional Hockey Writers Association.

In addition to the regular season awards, the Conn Smythe Trophy is awarded annually to the most valuable player during the NHL's Stanley Cup playoffs. Furthermore, the top coach in the league wins the Jack Adams Award, as selected by a poll of the National Hockey League Broadcasters Association. The National Hockey League publishes the names of the top three vote getters for all awards, and then names the award winner during the NHL Awards Ceremony.

Players, coaches, officials, and team builders who have had notable careers are eligible to be voted into the Hockey Hall of Fame. Players cannot enter until three years have passed since their last professional game, currently tied with the Naismith Memorial Basketball Hall of Fame for the shortest such time period of any major sport. One unique consequence has been Hall of Fame members (specifically, Gordie Howe, Guy Lafleur, and Mario Lemieux) coming out of retirement to play once more. If a player was deemed significant enough, the three-year wait would be waived; only ten individuals have been honoured in this manner. In 1999, Wayne Gretzky joined the Hall and became the last player to have the three-year restriction waived. After his induction, the Hall of Fame announced that Gretzky would be the last to have the waiting period waived.

== Origin of players ==
From the league's inception until the 1960s, almost all players in the NHL were Canadian. During the 1971–72 season, Canadians still made up over 95% of NHL players. The number of American players increased over time, and by the 1987–88 season, for example, 15% of NHL players were from the United States.

After the collapse of the Soviet Bloc from 1989, political restrictions on movement from the region were removed, leading to an increase in players from the Czech Republic, Slovakia, and Russia joining NHL teams. Swedes, Finns, and other Western European players, who were always free to move to North America, came to the league in greater numbers than before. Many of the league's top players since the 1990s have come from these European countries.

European players were drafted and signed by NHL teams in an effort to bring in more "skilled offensive players". The addition of European players changed the style of play in the NHL and European style hockey has been integrated into the NHL game.

As of the 2024–25 season, the NHL had players from 18 countries, with 41.1% coming from Canada, 29.6% from the United States, 9.5% from Sweden, 6.4% from Russia, and 5.5% from Finland. Players from a further 13 countries made up the remaining 7.9% of NHL rosters.

== Corporate sponsors ==
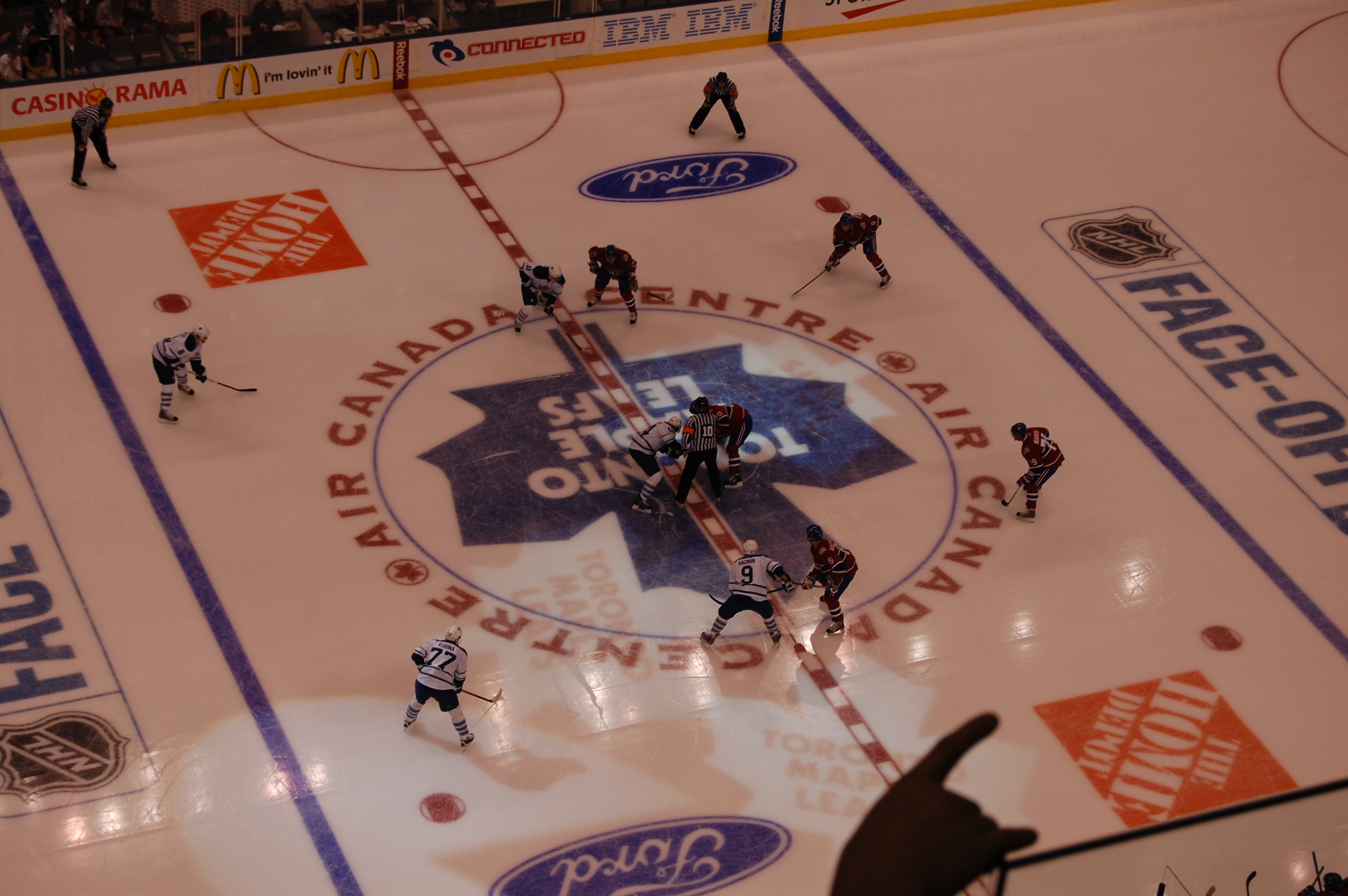
Logos of corporate sponsors are visible on the boards and ice in an NHL hockey rink.

The NHL lists its several official corporate partners in three categories: North American Partners, USA Partners and Canada Partners. Beginning in the 2020–21 NHL season, the league allowed for advertising on players' helmets during games. The NHL has allowed advertising on the front of team jerseys from the 2022–23 season.

== Media coverage ==
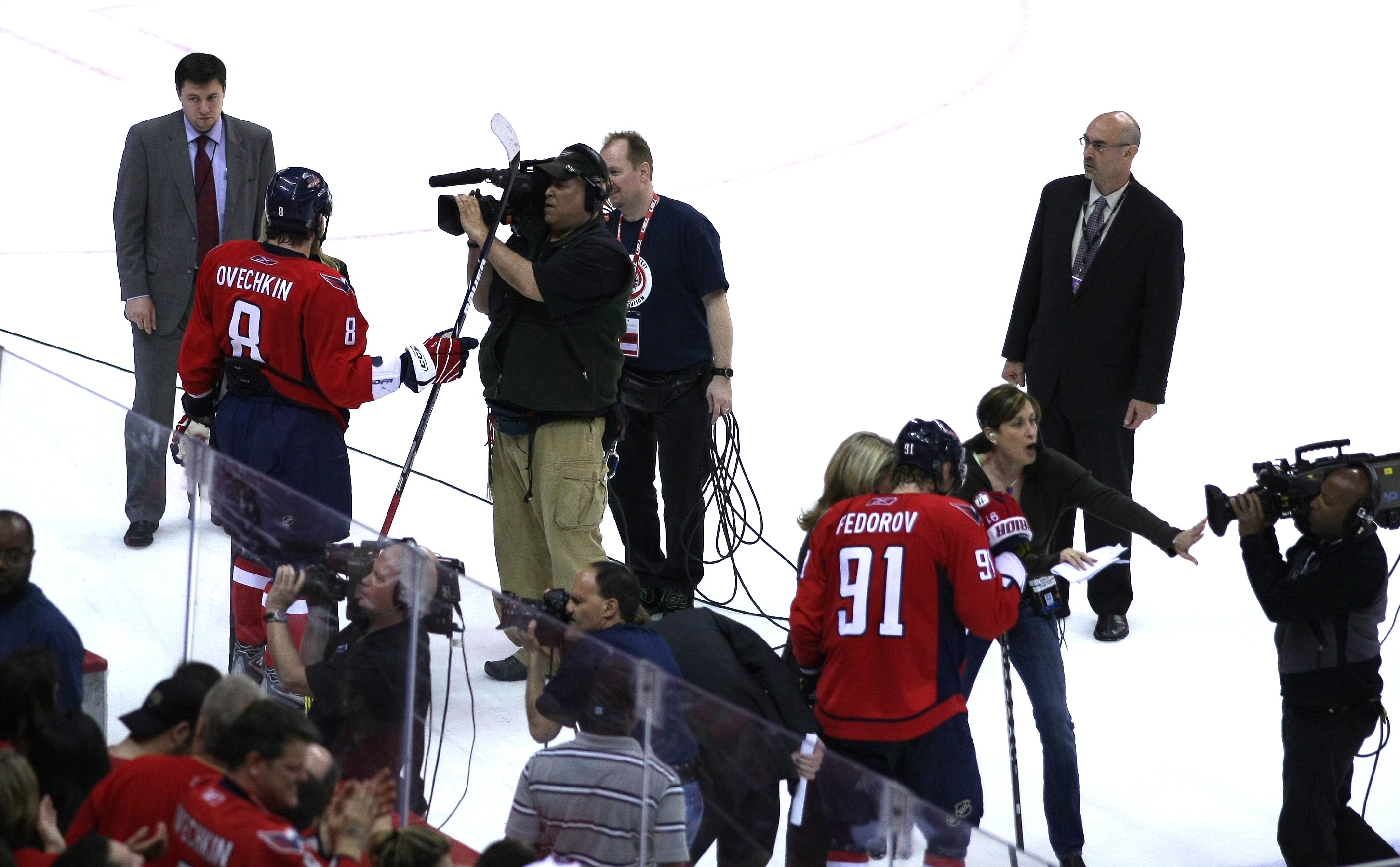
Members of the media interviewing players on ice after a game in 2009

=== Canada ===
The current national television and digital rightsholder is Rogers Communications, which initially signed a 12-year deal that began in the 2014–15 season, then signed a 12-year renewal to extend its agreement to 2037–38. National English-language coverage of the NHL is carried primarily by Rogers' Sportsnet group of specialty channels; Sportsnet holds weekly national windows on Monday and Saturday nights, and broadcasts other games outside of these windows as the schedule permits, as well as all NHL tentpole events and playoff coverage. Rogers also sub-licenses digital rights to Amazon Prime Video, which streams national Wednesday-night games.

Broadcasting rights in Canada historically included Hockey Night in Canada (HNIC), a long-running Saturday-night broadcast which began on CBC Radio in the 1920s, and made its debut on CBC Television in 1952, Under the first 12 years of Rogers Sportsnet' deal, Hockey Night in Canada was maintained and expanded under a sublicense agreement, airing up to seven games nationally on Saturday nights throughout the regular season. CBC maintained Rogers-produced NHL coverage during the regular season and playoffs. On June 16, 2026, CBC confirmed that it would no longer sublicense NHL coverage from Rogers, citing changes in its sports strategy following the 2026 Winter Olympics. The change resulted in the end of Hockey Night in Canada airing NHL games after 74 years. Under the current contract, Saturday Night Hockey premiered as a replacement for Hockey Night without the CBC's involvement.

Quebecor Media holds national French-language rights to the NHL under a sub-licensing deal with Rogers, with all coverage airing on its specialty channel TVA Sports.

Games that are not broadcast as part of the national rights deal are broadcast by Sportsnet's regional feeds, TSN's regional feeds, and RDS. Regional games are subject to blackout for viewers outside of each team's designated market.

=== United States ===
Historically, the NHL has never fared well on American television in comparison to the other American professional leagues. The league's American broadcast partners had been in flux for decades prior to 1995. Hockey broadcasting on a national scale was particularly spotty prior to 1981; NBC, CBS, and ABC held rights at various times during that period but with limited schedules during the second half of the regular season and the playoffs, along with some (but not all) of the Stanley Cup Final. The NHL primarily was then only available on cable television after 1981, airing on the USA Network, SportsChannel America, and ESPN at various times. Since 1995, national coverage has been split between broadcast and cable, first with Fox and ESPN from 1995 to 1999, then followed by ABC and ESPN from 1999 to 2004. The U.S. national rights were then held by NBC and OLN (later renamed Versus, then NBCSN) between the 2004–05 NHL lockout and 2021.

The 2021–22 season marks the first year of seven-year agreements with ESPN and TNT (formerly Turner) Sports. ESPN's deal includes 25 regular season games on ABC or ESPN, and 75 exclusive games streamed on ESPN+ and Hulu. Turner Sports' coverage includes up to 72 regular season games on TNT, with early round playoff coverage split between TNT and TBS. The playoffs will be split between ESPN and TNT, with ABC televising the Stanley Cup Final during even years and TNT (simulcast with TBS and TruTV) televising the championship series during odd years.

As in Canada, games not broadcast nationally are aired regionally within a team's home market and are subject to blackout outside of them. These broadcasters include regional sports networks, networks of over-the-air broadcast stations, and streaming. Certain national telecasts are non-exclusive, and may also air in tandem with telecasts of the game by local broadcasters. However, national telecasts of these games are blacked out in the participating teams' markets to protect the local broadcaster.

=== NHL Network ===
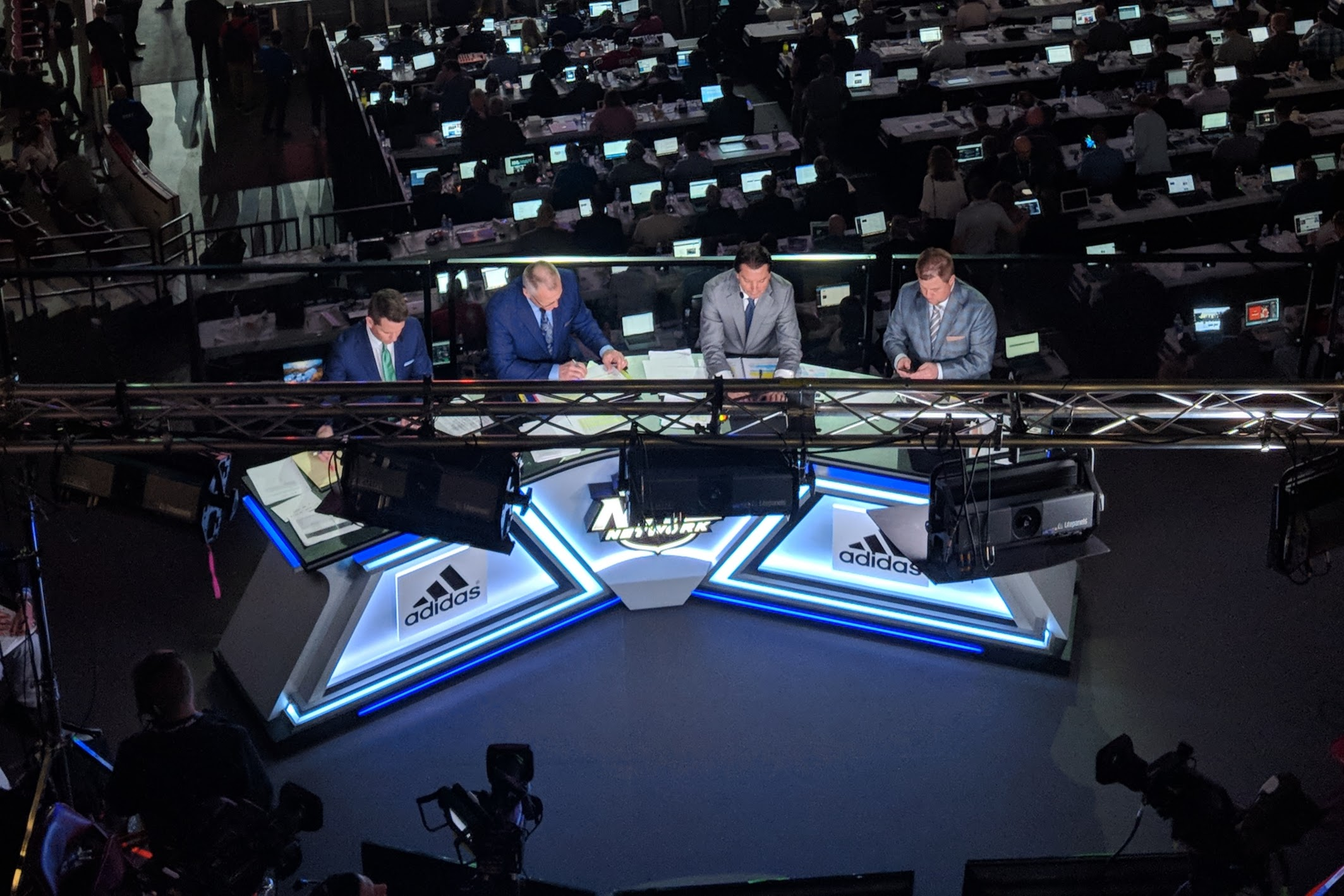
The NHL Network's television panel at the 2019 NHL entry draft at Rogers Arena in Vancouver

The league co-owns the NHL Network, a television specialty channel devoted to the NHL. Its signature show is NHL Tonight. The NHL Network also airs live games, but primarily simulcasts of one of the team's regional broadcasters.

=== Out-of-market packages ===
NHL Centre Ice in Canada and NHL Center Ice in the United States are the league's subscription-based, out-of-market sports packages that offer access to out-of-market feeds of games through a cable or satellite television provider.

The league originally launched NHL GameCenter Live in 2008, allowing the streaming of out-of-market games over the internet. MLB Advanced Media then took over of its day-to-day operations in 2016, renaming it NHL.tv. Under its contract, Rogers Communications distributes the service in Canada as NHL Live; it will be incorporated into Sportsnet Now Premium for the 2022–23 season. Under ESPN's contract, the league's out-of-market streaming package was incorporated into ESPN+ for those viewers in the United States in 2021.

=== International ===
Outside of Canada and the United States, NHL games are broadcast across Europe, in the Middle East, in Australia, and in the Americas across Mexico, Central America, Dominican Republic, Caribbean, South America and Brazil, among others.

NHL.tv is also available for people in most countries to watch games online, but blackout restrictions may still apply if a game is being televised in the user's country. For those in selected international markets where ESPN also holds the streaming rights, they must instead access games on the ESPN platform used in that particular country: ESPNPlayer, ESPN Play, the ESPN App, or Disney+ (previously Star+). And those in Denmark, Estonia, Finland, Iceland, Latvia, Lithuania, Norway, Poland, Sweden and the United Kingdom must use Viaplay.

== International competitions ==
=== Club participation ===
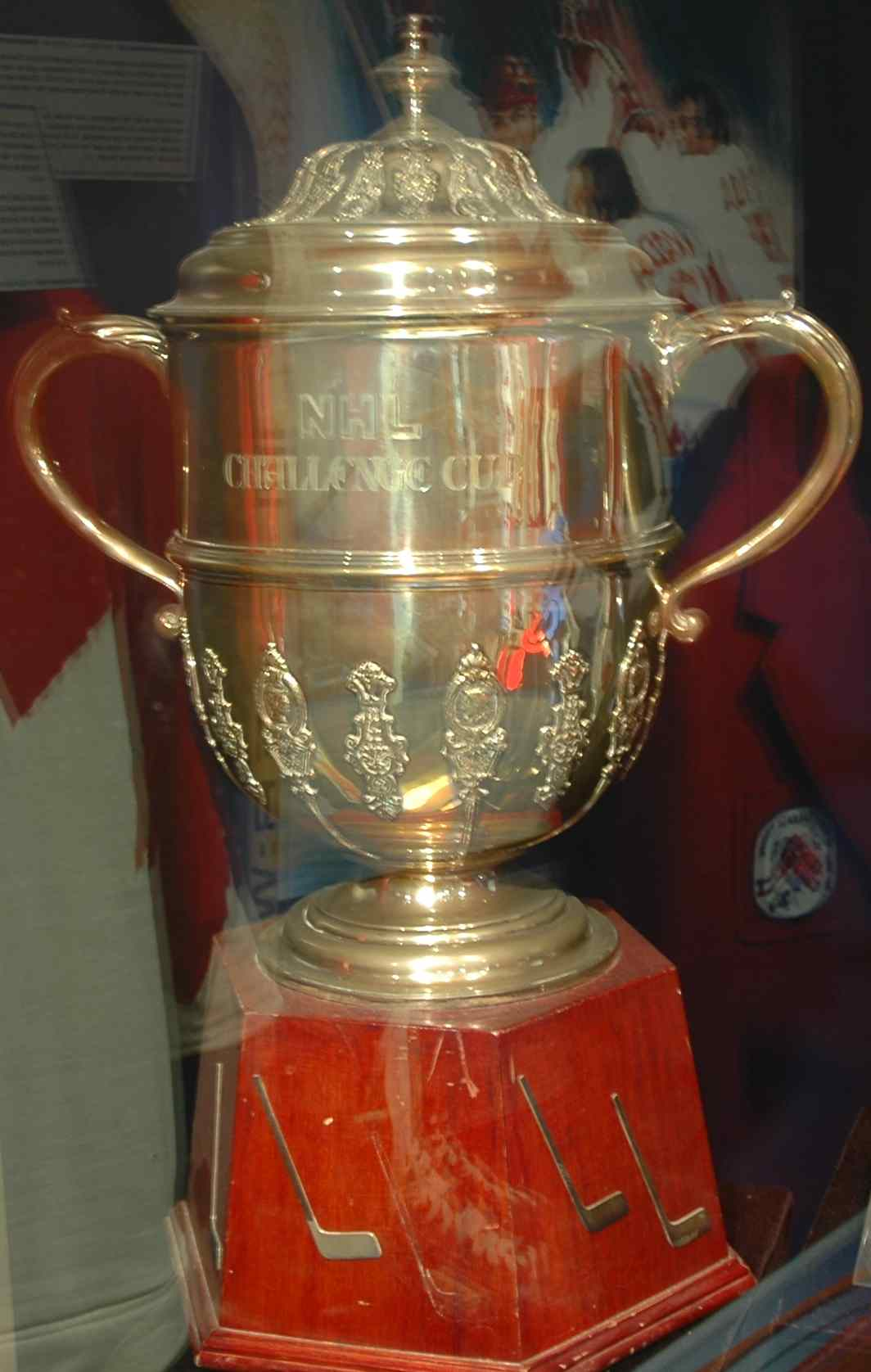
Challenge Cup Trophy for the 1979 Challenge Cup series between NHL All Stars and the Soviet national team

NHL teams have occasionally participated in international club competitions. Most of these competitions were arranged by the NHL or NHLPA. The first international club competition was held in 1976, with eight NHL teams playing against the Soviet Championship League's HC CSKA Moscow, and Krylya Sovetov Moscow. Between 1976 and 1991, the NHL, and the Soviet Championship League would hold several exhibition games between the two leagues known as the Super Series. No NHL club had played a Soviet or Russian-based club from the end of the Super Series in 1991 to 2008 when the New York Rangers faced Metallurg Magnitogorsk in the 2008 Victoria Cup.

In addition to the Russian clubs, NHL clubs had participated in several international club exhibitions and competitions with various European-based clubs. The first exhibition game to feature an NHL team against a European-based team (aside from clubs based in the former Soviet Union) was in December 1977, when the New York Rangers faced Poldi Kladno of the Czechoslovak First Ice Hockey League. In the 2000s, the NHL organized four NHL Challenge series between NHL and European clubs. The NHL continued to organize exhibition games between NHL and European teams before the beginning of the NHL season; those games were known as the NHL Premiere from 2007 to 2011 and as the NHL Global Series since 2017. The last exhibition game between an NHL and European club occurred during the 2024 NHL Global Series.

NHL clubs have also participated in IIHF-organized club tournaments. The most recent IIHF-organized event including an NHL club was the 2009 Victoria Cup, between the Swiss National League A's ZSC Lions and the Chicago Blackhawks.

=== Permittance of NHL players in international competitions ===
The NHL has also permitted its players to participate in international competitions among national teams. The annual Ice Hockey World Championships is held every May, at the same time as the Stanley Cup playoffs. Because of its timing, NHL players generally only join their country's team in the World Championships if their NHL team has been eliminated from Stanley Cup contention.

From 1998 to 2014, during the year of the quadrennial Winter Olympics, the NHL suspended its all-star game and expanded the traditional all-star break to allow NHL players to participate in the Olympic ice hockey tournament. In 2018, the NHL did not schedule an Olympic break, resulting in their players not participating in that year's Olympic tournament. An Olympic break was also not scheduled in 2022, with the NHL opting to not permit its players to participate due to a shortened NHL season that year, and concerns about the COVID-19 pandemic. The NHL, NHLPA, and IIHF have agreed to permit NHL players participate in the 2026 and 2030 Winter Olympics. The NHL and the NHLPA also organize the World Cup of Hockey. Unlike the Ice Hockey World Championships and the Olympic tournament, the World Cup of Hockey is played under NHL rules and not those of the IIHF.

In 2007, the International Ice Hockey Federation (IIHF) formalized the "Triple Gold Club", the group of players and coaches who have won an Olympic gold medal, a World Championship gold medal and the Stanley Cup. The term had first entered popular use following the 2002 Winter Olympics, which saw the addition of the first Canadian members.

== Popularity ==
The NHL is considered one of the four major professional sports leagues in North America, along with Major League Baseball, the National Football League, and the National Basketball Association. The league is very prominent in Canada, where it is the most popular of these four leagues. Overall, hockey has the smallest total fan base of the four leagues and receives the smallest annual revenue; the league earns the least from the television rights sale and has the lowest sponsorship.

The NHL had been the sport holding the most affluent fan base of the top four, but it slid behind the MLB and leveled off with the NFL in recent years. A study done by the Stanford Graduate School of Business in 2004, found that NHL fans in the United States were the most educated of the four major leagues. Further, it noted that season-ticket sales were more prominent in the NHL than the other three because of the financial ability of the NHL fan to purchase them. The NHL has the most white-based audience among the four. According to Reuters, in 2010, the largest demographic of NHL fans was males aged 18–34. The NHL estimates that half of its fan base roots for teams in outside markets. So, beginning in 2008, the NHL started to shift toward using digital technology to market to fans to capitalize on this.

The debut of the Winter Classic, an outdoor regular season NHL game held on New Year's Day in 2008, was a significant success for the league. The game has since become an annual staple of the NHL schedule. Coverage of "Hockey Day in America", later rebranded as Hockey Weekend Across America with TNT, allowed for multiple games to be broadcast in the United States on the national rights holder. These improvements led NBC and the cable channel Versus to sign a 10-year broadcast deal, paying US$200 million per year for both American cable and broadcast rights; the deal will lead to further increases in television coverage on the NBC channels.

This television contract has boosted viewership metrics for the NHL. The 2010 Stanley Cup playoffs saw the largest audience in the sport's history "after a regular season that saw record-breaking business success, propelled largely by the NHL's strategy of engaging fans through big events and robust digital offerings". This success has resulted in a 66 percent rise in NHL advertising and sponsorship revenue. Merchandise sales were up 22 percent, and the number of unique visitors on the NHL.com website was up 17 percent during the playoffs after rising 29 percent in the regular season.

== See also ==
- List of NHL records (individual)
- List of NHL records (team)
- List of NHL players with the most games played by franchise
- List of professional sports teams in the United States and Canada
- List of American and Canadian cities by number of major professional sports franchises
- List of TV markets and major sports teams
- List of National Hockey League attendance figures
- List of National Hockey League arenas
- NHL All-Rookie team
- NHL All-Star team
