= Chile national inline hockey team =

The Chilean national inline hockey team represents inline hockey in Chile at international competitions. The team have not played in any world championships until the Chilean Ice and Inline Hockey Federation was founded and it joined the IIHF in 2000. The team does however participate in the IIHF Inline Hockey World Championship and the FIRS Inline Hockey World Championship tournaments (organised by International Roller Sports Federation). Chile has rinks in Santiago, Puerto Montt, and Punta Arenas, where ice hockey is being developed.
