= Catalonia national ice hockey team =

Catalonia
- Association: Federació Catalana d'Esports d'Hivern

First international
- Catalonia 2 – 0 Belgium (Puigcerdà, Spain; 19 April 2003)

Biggest win
- Catalonia 11 – 8 Basque Country (Puigcerdà, Spain; 23 December 2023)

Biggest defeat
- Basque Country 9 – 1 Catalonia (Puigcerdà, Spain; 26 December 2009)

International record (W–L–T)
- 4-2-0

The Catalonian national ice hockey team (Catalan: Selecció Catalana d'hoquei sobre gel; Spanish: Selección de hockey sobre hielo de Cataluña) is the national ice hockey team of the Spanish autonomous community of Catalonia. They are controlled by the Catalan Federation of Winter Sports (Catalan: Federació Catalana d'Esports d'Hivern; Spanish: Federación Catalana de Deportes de Invierno). The team last participated in an international game in 2023, an 11–8 win against Basque Country.

== History ==
Catalonia played its first game in 2003 where they played an exhibition game against Belgium in Puigcerdà, Spain. Catalonia won the game 2–0. After a five-year absence Catalonia to international play when they competed in a one-game exhibition match against the Basque Country held in Vitoria-Gasteiz, Spain which Catalonia went on to win 5–3. The following year, Catalonia competed in a second exhibition game against Basque Country. Catalonia lost the match 1–9 and also lost their first game in international competition.

== All-time record against other nations ==
As of 23 December 2023

Team	GP	W	T	L	GF	GA
Basque Country	5	4	0	1	28	27
Belgium	1	1	0	0	2	0
