= Azerbaijan men's national ice hockey team =

Azerbaijan
- Association: Ice Hockey Federation of the Republic of Azerbaijan
- Head coach: Aleksandr Blinov
- Assistants: Zaur Mammadaliyev
- Home stadium: Heydar Aliyev Sports and Concert Complex
- Team colors: Blue, Red, Green
- IIHF code: AZE

The Azerbaijan national ice hockey team is the national men's ice hockey team of Azerbaijan. The team is controlled by the Ice Hockey Federation of the Republic of Azerbaijan and has been a member of the International Ice Hockey Federation (IIHF) since 6 May 1992. Azerbaijan is currently not ranked in the IIHF World Ranking.

== History ==
The first ice rink in Azerbaijan opened in 1990 but was soon thereafter closed. Despite being a member of the IIHF since 1992, the association has never played a game and only assembled for its first training session on 13 February 2024. The first training was held at the Heydar Aliyev Sports and Concert Complex and included eighteen players. The training was part of head coach Aleksandr Bilinov's long-term plan for the team and development of the sport in Azerbaijan, which included playing in a major international competition within the next five years. The creation of the team was announced by Mariana Vasileva, the country's Deputy Minister of Youth and Sports, earlier that month.

The Baku Flames, a club team representing Azerbaijan, made its international debut at the ADIHIC Cup in Kazan, Russia between May 11–15, 2024.
