= Basque Country national ice hockey team =

Basque Country
- Association: Negu Kiroletako Euskal Federakuntza
- Most games: Gorka Etxebarria (2)
- Most points: Gorka Etxebarria (6)

First international
- Catalonia 5 – 3 Basque Country (Basque Country (autonomous community)) (Vitoria-Gasteiz, Spain; 27 December 2008)

Biggest win
- (Basque Country (autonomous community)) Basque Country 9 – 1 Catalonia (Puigcerdà, Spain; 26 December 2009)

Biggest defeat
- Catalonia 11 – 8 Basque Country (Basque Country (autonomous community)) (Vitoria-Gasteiz, Spain; 23 December 2023)

International record (W–L–T)
- 1-5-0

The Basque Country national ice hockey team (Basque: Euskal Herriko izotz hockey selekzioa; Spanish: Selección de hockey sobre hielo de Euskadi) is the ice hockey team of the Spanish autonomous community of the Basque Country. They are controlled by the Basque Federation of Winter Sports (Basque: Negu Kiroletako Euskal Federakuntza; Spanish: Federación Vasca de Deportes de Invierno). The team last participated in an international game in 2023, a 11–8 loss to Catalonia.

== History ==
The Basque Country played its first game in 2008 where they played an exhibition game against Catalonia in Vitoria-Gasteiz, Spain. Basque Country lost the game 3–5. The following year, Basque Country competed in a second exhibition game against Catalonia this time held in the Catalan municipality of Puigcerdà. Basque Country won the match 9–1, recording their first win in international competition.

Gorka Extebarria holds the team record for most games played, with two, and most points, with six.

== All-time record against other nations ==
As of 23 December 2016

Team	GP	W	T	L	GF	GA
Catalonia	3	1	0	2	15	10
