= Macau Ice Sports Federation =

Macau
- Association name: Macau Ice Sports Federation
- IIHF Code: MAC
- IIHF membership: May 12, 2005
- President: Andrew Chan Chak Mo

Macau Ice Sports Federation

Chinese name
- Traditional Chinese: 澳門冰上運動總會
- Simplified Chinese: 澳门冰上运动总会
Transcriptions
Standard Mandarin
- Hanyu Pinyin: Àomén Bīngshàng Yùndòng Zǒnghuì

Portuguese name
- Portuguese: Associação Geral de Desportos sobre o Gelo de Macau

The Macau Ice Sports Federation is the governing body of ice hockey in Macau.
