= Namibia Ice and InLine Hockey Association =

Inline hockey governing body in Namibia

- Membership: World Skate; Former membership IIHF (1998–2017)
- Abbreviation: NIIHA
- Founded: 1998
- Location: Windhoek, Namibia
- President: Bernd Bajorat

The Namibia Ice and InLine Hockey Association (NIIHA) is the governing body of inline hockey in Namibia.

== History ==
The NIIHA was founded and joined the International Ice Hockey Federation on 31 May 1998. It was an affiliate member of the IIHF until 19 May 2017, they withdrew from an IIHF membership and are no longer an IIHF member due to lack of standard ice rinks and ice hockey activities in the country. According to the congress, the IIHF decided to keep Chile as an affiliate member, but there are no new members at this congress. Namibia still maintain to play just inline hockey and as a member of the International Roller Sports Federation (now World Skate).

== Statistics ==
- 416 players total
- 86 male players
- 225 junior players
- 105 female players
- 35 referees
- 5 inline rinks but no ice rinks exist
- No longer an IIHF member

== See also ==
- Namibia national inline hockey team
- Namibia women's national inline hockey team
