= Nepal Ice Hockey Association =

Sports governing body in Nepal

Nepal
- Association name: Nepal Ice Hockey Association
- IIHF Code: NEP
- Founded: June 17, 2014
- IIHF membership: May 20, 2016
- President: Bhuwan Pathak

The Nepal Ice Hockey Association (NIHA) (Nepali: नेपाल आइस हक्की संघ) is the governing body of ice hockey in Nepal.

== History ==
The Nepal Ice Hockey Association was founded on June 17, 2014. The NIHA consists of 16 members, including Lok Bahadur Shahi, a former national footballer who is engaged in various other social activities. Nepal joined the International Ice Hockey Federation (IIHF) on May 20, 2016.
