= Ice Hockey Federation of the Republic of Azerbaijan =

Sports governing body in Azerbaijan

Azerbaijan
- Association name: Ice Hockey Federation of the Republic of Azerbaijan
- IIHF membership: May 6, 1992
- President: Vagif D. Mussayev (General Secretary: Mr Valery Laryukov)

The Ice Hockey Federation of the Republic of Azerbaijan (Azerbaijani: Azərbaycan Respublikası Buzda Xokkey Federasiyası) is the national governing body for ice hockey in Azerbaijan.

== History ==
The Ice Hockey Federation of the Republic of Azerbaijan was founded in 1991 as a part of the Soviet Ice Hockey Federation. After the Soviet Union disintegrated, the Federation joined the International Ice Hockey Federation on May 6, 1992.

There is no organized national hockey league in Azerbaijan, and the country has not played in any IIHF tournaments. The first ice rink in Azerbaijan was opened in 2023.
