= Kenya men's national ice hockey team =

Kenya
- Nickname: Ice Lions
- Association: Kenya Federation of Ice Sports
- General manager: Robert Opiyo
- Captain: Benjamin Njoroge Mburu
- Home stadium: Solar Ice Rink
- Team colors
- IIHF code: KEN

Ranking
- Current IIHF: (▲ ) (26 May 2025)

First international
- Kenya 9-10 Last Game All Stars (Nairobi, Kenya; 9 March 2019) (Note: Unofficial)

Biggest win
- Kenya 13-3 Friendship Pro Team (Cape Town, South Africa; 20 August 2024)

Biggest defeat
- Kenya 2-12 Team World (Nairobi, Kenya; 9 December 2023)

The Kenya national ice hockey team (Swahili: Timu ya Taifa ya Magongo ya Kenya) is the national men's ice hockey team of Kenya. The team is controlled by the Kenya Federation of Ice Sports and has been an associate member of the International Ice Hockey Federation (IIHF) since 26 September 2024. Kenya is currently unranked in the IIHF World Ranking and has not entered in any IIHF World Championship events.

== History ==
In 2005, the Solar Ice Rink was opened in the Panari Hotel in Nairobi, Kenya, and, to date, is the only ice rink in the country. The Kenya Men’s National Team (also known as Kenya Ice Lions) made their debut in 2019 when they lost 9-10 to the Last Game All Stars, calling attention to the impact of climate change in Kenya and around the world. In 2024, Kenya was admitted to the International Ice Hockey Federation (IIHF) as an associate member. Since 2019, the Kenyan team has played 18 unofficial games against American, Russian, and other international teams.

== Players ==
All players of Kenya national team play for the country's only club, Kenya Ice Lions. In the future, the team will be able to draft Kenyan citizens living abroad.
