= National Ice Hockey Federation of the Republic of Moldova =

- Membership: Former membership IIHF (2008–2023)
- Founded: 2007
- Location: Chișinău, Moldova
- President: Darii Adrian Vitalievici

The National Ice Hockey Federation of the Republic of Moldova (Romanian: Federația Națională de Hochei pe Gheață din Republica Moldova) is the governing body of ice hockey in Moldova. It was founded in 2007 and became a member of the International Ice Hockey Federation on 20 May 2008, but ceased being a member in 2023. Moldova has never had a national ice hockey team. In 2019, the only ice hockey activity in the country was noted to be a youth club in Chișinău. According to IIHF statistics, as of September 2023, there were no registered ice hockey players or ice rinks in Moldova. Platina Chișinău, aforementioned only hockey activity in Moldova does play in the Junior Hockey League.
