= Chilean Ice and Inline Hockey Federation =

Ice hockey and inline hockey governing body of Chile

Chile
- Association name: Federación Chilena de Hockey en Línea y en Hielo
- IIHF Code: CHI
- IIHF membership: 2000. Chile is an affiliate member, therefore only has IIHF recognition for inline hockey.
- President: no current president

The Chilean Ice and Inline Hockey Federation (Spanish: Federación Chilena de Hockey en Línea y en Hielo, FCHLH) is the governing body of ice and inline hockey in Chile.

== See also ==
- Chile national ice hockey team
- Chile national inline hockey team
