= IIHF World Championship Division III =

International ice hockey tournament

- Upcoming season or competition: 2027 IIHF World Championship Division III
- Sport: Ice hockey
- Founded: 1987 (Pool D); 2003 (Division III)
- No. of teams: 12
- Most recent champion: Turkey
- Most titles: North Korea (3); Bulgaria (3); New Zealand (3); Turkey (3)
- Promotion to: Division II
- Relegation to: Division IV
- Website: IIHF.com

The IIHF World Championship Division III are an annual sports event organized by the International Ice Hockey Federation (IIHF). It was the lowest level of the IIHF World Championships until the formation of Division IV for 2020.

== Organization ==
When the IIHF reorganized its World Championships hierarchy in 2001, which included replacing "pools" with "divisions", nations outside of the top 40 were placed in Division II Qualification, trying to qualify for participation in the following year's Division II championship. This qualifier was not deemed a championship tournament by the IIHF, but was simply used to determine the teams that would replace the two teams relegated out of the Division II championship. The bottom two nations from the 2000 Pool D championship, Luxembourg and Turkey, had been relegated and were slated to compete in the 2001 Division II Qualification, against other nations attempting to reach the 2002 Division II championship. When no other nations submitted their names to enter the 2001 qualifier, there was no need for Luxembourg and Turkey to meet, and both were promoted to Division II for 2002. Three teams met in the last, 2002, Division II Qualification.

In 2003, the Division II Qualification was officially replaced by the Division III Championship, with the winner of the tournament now being declared a champion, and the top two finishers still earning promotion to the following year's Division II Championship, to be replaced in Division III by the two teams relegated down from Division II.

In 2011, the IIHF allowed eight teams, rather than the previous year's six, to compete. The teams were divided into two groups, with the winner of each group declared co-champion and promoted to the following year's Division II tournament. While Division III returned to a six team competition in 2012, reorganization of the Division II system meant that only the champion of Division III was promoted, replacing the single team from Division II Group B that was relegated.

In 2013, the IIHF again had eight teams interested in contesting the Division III Championship. The decision was made to hold a four team qualifier, with the bottom two teams from 2012 plus two new invitees, to determine two teams to qualify for that year's Division III Championship. As with the earlier Division II Qualifications, the 2013 Division III Qualification was not a championship. The Division III Championship did not have this preliminary qualifier after the 2013 event.

In 2018, the IIHF reintroduced the Division III Qualification, but used it to determine a single team that would be invited to compete in the following year's Division III Championship, replacing the team relegated out of Division III – a variation from the 2013 Division III Qualification. This process was repeated in 2019.

== Results ==
From 2003 until 2011, the Division III champion and the second-place finisher were promoted to Division II, replacing the two teams from Division II that were relegated to the Division III. From 2012 until 2017, only the Division III champion was promoted, to Division II Group B. From 2003 to 2010, and again from 2012 to 2016, no teams were relegated from Division III; the 2012 exception, noted above, was the IIHF holding a four team qualifier with the previous year's bottom two teams and two new invitees. By 2017, the demand from teams wishing to compete had grown to the point where the bottom team of 2017 was relegated to the newly introduced 2018 Division III Qualification, where the top qualifier earned a spot in the following year's Division III championship. The Division III Qualification was expanded in 2019, and interest had grown enough that a new Division IV Championship, rather than qualifiers, was added for 2020. In addition, the Division III Championship was expanded to two groups for 2020.

Year	Promoted	
Year	Champion	2nd Place
2003	New Zealand	Luxembourg
2004	Iceland	Turkey
2005	Mexico	South Africa
2006	Iceland	Turkey
2007	New Zealand	Ireland
2008	North Korea	South Africa
2009	New Zealand	Turkey
2010	North Korea	Ireland
2011	Israel	South Africa
2012	Turkey	North Korea
2013	South Africa	North Korea
2014	Bulgaria	North Korea
2015	North Korea	Turkey
2016	Turkey	South Africa
2017	Luxembourg	Bulgaria
2018	Georgia	Bulgaria
2019	Bulgaria	Turkey
2022	United Arab Emirates	Turkey
2023	Chinese Taipei	Turkmenistan
2024	Thailand	Kyrgyzstan
2025	Kyrgyzstan	Turkmenistan
2026	Turkey	Mexico

Year	Promoted		Relegated
Year	To Division II B	To Division III	To Division III Qualification
2018	Georgia (Division III)	Turkmenistan (Division III Qualification)	Hong Kong
2019	Bulgaria	United Arab Emirates (Division III Qualification)	South Africa

Year	Promoted		Relegated	
Year	To Division II B	To Division III A	To Division III B	To Division IV
2020	Cancelled due to the COVID-19 pandemic.			
2021	Cancelled due to the COVID-19 pandemic.			
2022	United Arab Emirates	South Africa		
2023	Chinese Taipei	Kyrgyzstan	North Korea	Malaysia
2024	Thailand	Bosnia and Herzegovina	Mexico	Iran
2025	Kyrgyzstan	Mexico	Luxembourg	Singapore
2026	Turkey	Uzbekistan	Turkmenistan	No team relegaed.

== Pool D ==
=== Champions (1987–2000) ===
Year	National team
1987	Australia
1989	Belgium
1990	Great Britain
1992^	Spain
1994^	Estonia
1995^	Croatia
1996	Lithuania
1997	Croatia
1998	Bulgaria
1999	Spain
2000	Israel

^ – In 1992, 1994, and 1995, there was no Pool D. However, Pool C was divided in two tiers where the winner of 'C2' was promoted to 'C1', essentially making C2 the same as D. Accordingly, the winners (Spain, Estonia and Croatia) are listed here.

== Summary of participation ==
- In 2010, the two four-team tournaments were played, this charts ranks them together assigning gold silver and bronze to the nations who ranked 41st, 42nd, and 43rd overall.
- The Division III teams (2019) are ranked one to twelve, with this chart assessing gold, silver, and bronze to the nations who ranked 41st, 42nd, and 43rd overall.

Team	Times	First	Last	Gold	Silver	Bronze	Total	Best finish (first/last)	Hosted
Armenia	4	2004	2010	0	0	1	1	3rd (2006)	1
Australia	9	1987	2000	1	2	2	5	1st (1987)	1
Belgium	9	1989	2000	1	1	0	2	1st (1989)	1
Bosnia and Herzegovina	10	2008	2026	0	0	1	1	3rd (2026)	2
Bulgaria	6	1996	2019	3	2	0	5	1st (1998/2019)	2
Chinese Taipei^{[N1]}	5	2017	2023	1	0	0	1	1st (2023)	0
Croatia	3	1994	1997	2	0	0	2	1st (1995/1997)	0
Estonia	1	1994		1	0	0	1	1st (1994)	0
Georgia	5	2013	2018	1	0	1	2	1st (2018)	0
Great Britain	2	1989	1990	1	0	1	2	1st (1990)	1
Greece	10	1992	2013	0	1	1	2	2nd (2010)	0
Hong Kong	11	1987	2026	0	0	0	0	4th (1987/2017)	0
Iran	2	2023	2024	0	0	0	0	11th (2023)	0
Iceland	4	1999	2006	2	0	0	2	1st (2004/2006)	3
Ireland	8	2004	2013	1	1	0	2	1st (2010)	1
Israel	9	1992	2011	2	1	1	4	1st (2000/2011)	0
Kuwait	2	2018	2019	0	0	0	0	10th (2018)	0
Kyrgyzstan	4	2019	2025	1	1	0	2	1st (2025)	1
Lithuania	2	1995	1996	1	1	0	2	1st (1996)	1
Luxembourg	22	1992	2026	1	1	9	11	1st (2017)	3
Malaysia	1	2023		0	0	0	0	12th (2023)	0
Mexico	6	2000	2026	1	1	1	3	1st (2005)	2
Mongolia	7	2007	2026	0	0	0	0	5th (2007)	0
New Zealand	9	1987	2009	3	0	1	4	1st (2003/2009)	2
North Korea	9	2008	2026	3	3	0	6	1st (2008/2015)	0
Philippines	3	2024	2026	0	0	0	0	10th (2024)	0
Romania	1	1989		0	1	0	1	2nd (1989)	0
Serbia and Montenegro^{[N2]}	2	1996	1997	0	1	0	1	2nd (1996)	0
Singapore	3	2023	2025	0	0	0	0	10th (2023)	0
South Africa	21	1992	2026	1	4	2	7	1st (2013)	8
South Korea	5	1987	1997	0	2	1	3	2nd (1987/1997)	0
Spain	8	1989	1999	2	1	4	7	1st (1992/1999)	1^{[N3]}
Thailand	5	2019	2026	1	0	0	1	1st (2024)	0
Turkey	18	1992	2026	3	6	4	13	1st (2012/2026)	3
Turkmenistan	7	2018	2026	0	2	2	4	2nd (2023, 2025)	0
United Arab Emirates	8	2010	2022	1	0	0	1	1st (2022)	1
Uzbekistan	1	2026		0	0	0	0	7th (2026)	0

- Note 1. Commonly known as Taiwan.
- Note 2. Known then as the Federal Republic of Yugoslavia.
- Note 3. Andorra also hosted one tournament.

== See also ==
- Ice Hockey World Championships
- IIHF World Championship Division I
- IIHF World Championship Division II
