= 2008 Men's Ice Hockey World Championships =

2008 edition of the Men's World Ice Hockey Championships

The 2008 Men's Ice Hockey World Championships was the 72nd such event hosted by the International Ice Hockey Federation. Teams representing 48 countries participated in four levels of competition. The competition also served as qualification for division placements in the 2009 competition. Russia won the Top Division tournament and became the world champions. In the Division I Championship held in April, Austria and Hungary were promoted to the Championship division, while South Korea and Estonia were demoted to Division II. In the Division II competition, Romania and Australia were promoted, Ireland and New Zealand were relegated to Division III. Greece won the Division III qualification in February, and competed in the Division III competition from March to April. In that competition, North Korea and South Africa were promoted to Division II for 2009.

== Championship (Top Division) ==
Sixteen teams comprise Top Division, with the bottom two teams relegating to Division I for the following year.

Final standings

1. Russia
2. Canada
3. Finland
4. Sweden
5. Czech Republic
6. United States
7. Switzerland
8. Norway
9. Belarus
10. Germany
11. Latvia
12. Denmark
13. Slovakia
14. France
15. Slovenia — relegated to Division I for 2009
16. Italy — relegated to Division I for 2009

== Division I ==
Twelve teams comprise Division I. They are broken into two groups, with the winner of each group gaining promotion to the World Championship pool for the following year.

Group A

Final standings

1. Austria — promoted to Championship pool for 2009
2. Kazakhstan
3. Poland
4. Great Britain
5. Netherlands
6. South Korea — relegated to Division II for 2009

Group B

Final standings

1. Hungary — promoted to Championship pool for 2009
2. Ukraine
3. Japan
4. Lithuania
5. Croatia
6. Estonia — relegated to Division II for 2009

== Division II ==
Twelve teams comprise Division II. They are also broken into two groups competing to advance into Division I.

Group A

Final standings

1. Romania — promoted to Division I for 2009
2. Belgium
3. Serbia
4. Israel
5. Bulgaria
6. Ireland — relegated to Division III for 2009

Group B

Final standings

1. Australia — promoted to Division I for 2009
2. China
3. Spain
4. Mexico
5. Iceland
6. New Zealand — relegated to Division III for 2009

== Division III ==
Three teams comprised the Division III Qualification with the winning team advanced to the 2008 Division III main tournament. The main tournament of the Division III is made up of six teams. The top two teams are promoted to Division II for the following year.

Qualification tournament

Final standings

1. Greece — qualified for the main tournament
2. Bosnia and Herzegovina
3. Armenia

Main tournament

Final standings

1. North Korea — promoted to Division II for 2009
2. South Africa — promoted to Division II for 2009
3. Luxembourg
4. Turkey
5. Greece
6. Mongolia

== See also ==
- 2008 World Juniors
- 2008 Women's
- 2008 Men's U18
- 2008 Women's U18
