= 2008 World Ice Hockey Championships =

2008 World Ice Hockey Championships may refer to:

- 2008 Men's World Ice Hockey Championships
- 2009 Women's World Ice Hockey Championships
- 2008 World Junior Ice Hockey Championships
- 2008 IIHF World U18 Championships
