= Greece men's national ice hockey team =

Greece
- Nickname: Hellas (Ελλάς)
- Association: Hellenic Ice Sports Federation
- Head coach: Grigoris Apostolidis
- Captain: Dimitrios Kalyvas
- Most games: Orestis Tilios (41)
- Top scorer: Dimitrios Kalyvas (26)
- Most points: Dimitrios Kalyvas (55)
- Team colors
- IIHF code: GRE
Home colours	Away colours

Ranking
- Current IIHF: NR (3 June 2026)
- Highest IIHF: 44 (2011–14)
- Lowest IIHF: 49 (2015–16)

First international
- Greece 15–3 Turkey (Johannesburg, South Africa; 21 March 1992)

Biggest win
- Greece 13–0 Georgia (Abu Dhabi, UAE; 15 October 2012)

Biggest defeat
- Israel 26–2 Greece (Cape Town, South Africa; 15 April 2011)

IIHF World Championships
- Appearances: 12 (first in 1992)
- Best result: 29th (1992)

International record (W–L–T)
- 23–43–1

Medal record

Division III / Pool C
Silver medal – second place	2010 Luxembourg (Group A)	
Bronze medal – third place	1992 South Africa Pool C2	

The Greece national ice hockey team (Greek: Εθνική Ελλάδος χόκεϊ επί πάγου) is the national ice hockey team of Greece and as an associate member of the International Ice Hockey Federation (IIHF) that competed in Division III of the IIHF World Championships.

The Greece National Ice hockey team has competed in 10 IIHF World Championship Division III (1992, 1995, 1998, 1999, 2008, 2009, 2010, 2011, 2012 and 2013) 4 World Championship Qualifications (1993, 1996, 2008 and 2012) and 1 Olympic Qualification (1996)

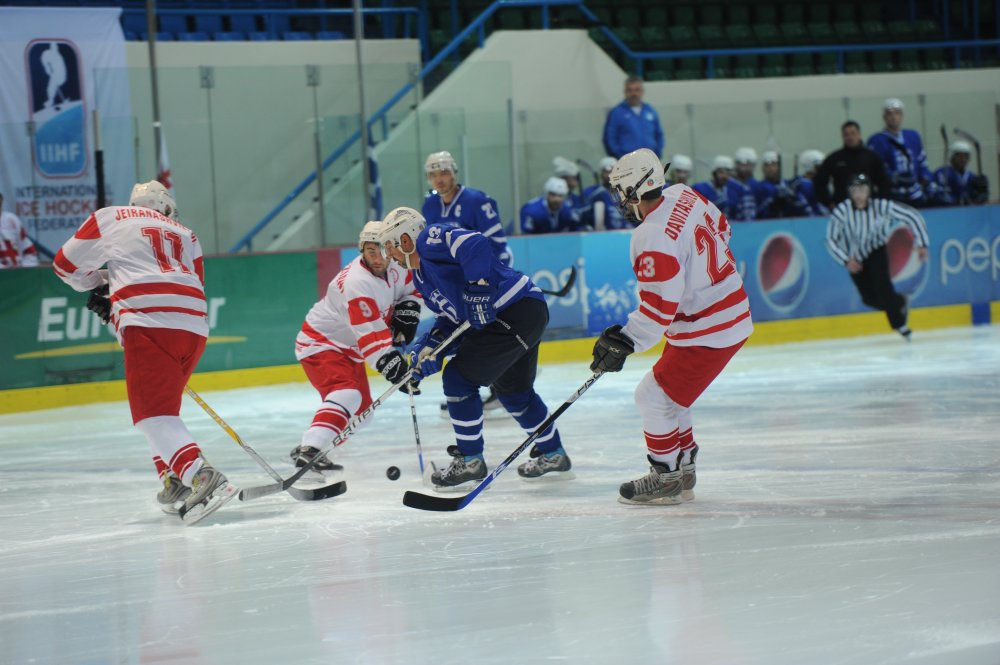
Georgia and Greece during the 2013 World Championship Division III Qualification. Greece won the match 13–0.

The Greece National ice hockey Team's greatest result is the Silver Medal at the 2010 IIHF World Championship Division III that was held in Luxembourg, followed by the bronze medal at the 1992 Men's Ice Hockey World Championships Pool C held in South Africa.

At present time, Greece is unable to compete in IIHF tournaments because it cannot fulfill the minimum standard of having one operational "Olympic size" indoor rink in the country. The National Team last competed in the 2013 IIHF World Championship Division III that were held in South Africa and will only compete again officially when a regular ice rink opens and the Greek Ice Hockey Championship starts up again.

== History ==
Ice hockey started in Greece in 1984 by players that returned to Greece from abroad. The first official Greek Championship was held in 1989 at the Peace and Friendship Stadium with five teams taking place. It was the first time that ice hockey games were held in an official-size rink in the country. In 1990, the first junior national team was formed and took part in the World Junior Championship Pool C, held in Yugoslavia. In 1991, the junior national team took part in the World Junior Championship, held in Italy. In 1992, the first ever men's national team was formed and took place in the World Championships Pool C2 held in South Africa. With only two weeks of serious training abroad and the support of the Greeks of South Africa, the men's national team finished ahead of three other new hockey nations, winning the bronze medal, placing them 29th overall.

Despite the great achievement, the start of the decline of the sport came in 1993. Economic help was discontinued by the Greek Undersecretary of State for Sports and all expenses to keep ice hockey alive were passed over to the players. Practices stopped and many players quit.

Since May 2003, the last ice rink in Greece closed and the national team was left without an ice rink. In the next 4 years, players of the national team traveled at their own expense in the Czech Republic in order to train themselves.

Ice hockey was slowly dying until Dimitris Kalyvas (last captain of the Greece National Team) decided to start efforts to bring the National Team back to international competition. He focused his efforts with the Greek Government and specifically the Ministry of Sports in Greece, but also with the International Ice Hockey Federation (IIHF). After many months of effort he convinced the International Ice Hockey Federation (IIHF) that the National Team is still active and that development of the sport is continuing in the country despite not having an ice rink. He later received the support of the Hellenic Ice Sports Federation. After many emails, the IIHF decided to send 2 delegates to Athens to investigate. After a review by the IIHF in 2007 Greece retained its status within the IIHF and took part in a qualification tournament against Armenia and Bosnia-Herzegovina in Sarajevo prior to the 2008 Division III championship in Luxembourg. They defeated both teams, beating Bosnia-Herzegovina 10 – 1 in their first international game after almost 10 years and Armenia 8 – 5 (although Armenia was forced to forfeit each game 5 – 0 for using non-eligible players). After the qualification that gave new life to Ice Hockey in Greece, they went on to take part in 6 consecutive World Championships Div. III. From 2008 until 2013, highlighted by a second-place finish (Silver Medal) in their group (third overall) in 2010.

Many articles were written at the time of Dimitris' efforts to bring the National team back to international competition. The 2007 article written by Bill Meltzer and posted on the IIHF.com website titled: Greek hockey - against all odds: Efforts by leaders like Kalyvas bring the Greece national team back to IIHF competitions is a perfect example.

Dimitris went on to be the longest running Captain of the National team and one of the longest running Captains in international ice hockey history wearing the "C" on his jersey for 15 years. He is also the top scorer of Greek Ice Hockey history having scored 26 goals and 55 points helping the National team on and off the ice.

Unfortunately, despite the efforts of the National team and Dimitris continuous efforts off the ice, the IIHF determined in 2013 that the team will not be able to participate in any World Championship programs until an Olympic sized ice rink is constructed in the country.

In December 2023, it was announced that Greece would ice a team at the 2024 IIHF Development Cup, a tournament for nations that can't participate in the IIHF World Championship, due to the lack of an Olympic sized ice rink. Greece will play against Liechtenstein, Ireland, Argentina, Colombia, Brazil & Portugal.

== National Team Participations ==
- 1992 Men's Ice Hockey World Championships Pool C2
- 1993 Men's Ice Hockey World Championships Qualification
- 1995 Men's Ice Hockey World Championships Pool C2
- 1996 Men's Ice Hockey World Championships Qualifications
- 1998 Men's Ice Hockey World Championships Group D
- 1999 Men's Ice Hockey World Championships Group D
- 2008 IIHF World Championship Division III Qualification
- 2008 IIHF World Championship Division III
- 2009 IIHF World Championship Division III
- 2010 IIHF World Championship Division III
- 2011 IIHF World Championship Division III
- 2012 IIHF World Championship Division III
- 2013 IIHF World Championship Division III - Qualifications
- 2013 IIHF World Championship Division III

== Future Greece National Team ==
In order for Greece to create a national team again that will participate in IIHF World Championships, the following need to occur:

1) an Olympic-size rink needs to open in the country

2) a Greek League of at least 4 Teams needs to get organized.

If players with Greek heritage who are living abroad want to play for the Greece National Team, then they need to follow the International Ice Hockey Federation (IIHF) rules below.

According to the rules of the International Ice Hockey Federation (IIHF), which is the governing body of Ice Hockey Worldwide:

When a player has multiple citizenship (for example Greek-Canadian or Greek-American, etc.) and he/she has never represented any country in any IIHF championship or an Olympic competition or in qualifications to these competitions, then in order to play for the country of his/her choice he/she must:

a) Hold a passport of the country they chose to represent. In this case a Greek Passport.

b) prove that he has participated at least two consecutive hockey seasons and 16 consecutive months (480 days) in the national competitions of his new country after his 10th birthday (In our case the Greek Ice Hockey League where games are played in Greece). Female players need to have participated on a consistent basis for at least one hockey season and have been member of the new national association for at least 8 consecutive months (240 days) during that period.

c) Is a resident in the country that he/she wishes to represent (lives in Greece) during which period he/she has neither transferred to another country nor played ice hockey within any other country.

After following the above a player would be eligible to play for the national team of Greece.

== All-times top Scorers of the National Team ==
Men's Hellenic National Team (including 2013 World Championship Div. III)

Name	Goals	Assists	Points
Dimitris Kalyvas (C)	26	29	55
George Adamidis	16	17	33
Ioannis Koufis	21	8	29
Dimitrios Malamas	14	15	29
Nikos Papadopoulos	5	23	28
Georgios Kalyvas (A)	13	12	25
Orestis Tilios (A)	12	12	24

== 2013 World Championship Division III ==
Forwards
#	Player	Position	Shoots	Date of birth	Club
2	Pavlos Kasampoulis	F	L	Jul. 21, 1988	Iptamenoi Pagodromoi Athinai
3	Polykarpos Amanatidis	F	L	Aug. 23, 1979	Aris Thessaloniki
6	Georgios Kouleles	F	R	Oct. 2, 1983	Iptamenoi Pagodromoi Athinai
7	Eleftherios Fournogerakis	F	R	Oct. 19, 1979	Mad Cows Athens
8	Iason Pachos	F	R	Aug. 3, 1985	Iptamenoi Pagodromoi Athinai
10	Alexandros Valsamas-Rallis	F	R	Oct. 1, 1984	Iptamenoi Pagodromoi Athinai
12	Dimitrios Malamas	F	R	May 12, 1973	Aris Thessaloniki
13	Ioannis Koufis	F	R	Jun. 28, 1965	Iptamenoi Pagodromoi Athinai
17	Panagiotis Koulouris	LW	L	Sep. 2, 1983	Aris Thessaloniki
19	Georgios Kalyvas	F	L	Dec. 6, 1978	Iptamenoi Pagodromoi Athinai
21	Dimitris Kalyvas	F	L	Dec. 11, 1973	Iptamenoi Pagodromoi Athinai
22	Kyriakos Adamidis	F	L	Dec. 03, 1990	PAOK Thessaloníki HC

Defencemen
#	Player	Position	Shoots	Date of birth	Club
5	Nikolaos Chatzigiannis	D	L	Jan. 30, 1978	Iptamenoi Pagodromoi Athinai
9	Ioannis Ziakas	D	L	Jul. 31, 1972	Iptamenoi Pagodromoi Athinai
11	Orestis Tilios	D	L	Nov. 7, 1974	Iptamenoi Pagodromoi Athinai
14	Diogenis Souras	D	R	Sep. 8, 1986	Iptamenoi Pagodromoi Athinai
15	Antonis Kanellis	D	L	May 29, 1991	Iptamenoi Pagodromoi Athinai
24	Nikolaos Papadopoulos	D	R	Dec. 22, 1987	PAOK Thessaloníki HC
16	Marios Libertos	D	R	Jun. 14, 1970	Iptamenoi Pagodromoi Athinai

Goaltenders
#	Player	Position	Catches	Date of birth	Club
1	Georgios Fiotakis	G	L	Jan. 25, 1971	Albatros Athens
25	Dalibor Ploutsis	G	L	Nov. 15, 1976	Iptamenoi Pagodromoi Athinai

Staff
Title	Staff Member
Head coach	Igor Apostolidis
Assistant coach	Panagiotis Efkarpidis
Team Leader	Nikos Bliagos
Staff	Georgia Proimou

=== Player statistics ===
#	Name	GP	Goals	Assists	Points	SOG	PIM
17	Panagiotis Koulouris	5	4	2	6	16	14
21	Dimitris Kalyvas (C)	5	0	6	6	16	2
24	Nikolaos Papadopoulos	4	0	3	3	12	14
19	Georgios Kalyvas (A)	5	2	0	2	13	0
7	Eleftherios Fournogerakis	5	1	1	2	3	2
10	Alexandros Valsamas-Rallis	5	1	1	2	11	0
13	Ioannis Koufis	5	1	0	1	15	4
11	Orestis Tilios (A)	5	1	0	1	11	2
22	Kyriakos Adamidis	5	1	0	1	11	2
8	Iason Pachos	5	0	1	1	8	10
4	Polykarpos Amanatidis	5	0	0	0	8	6
5	Nikolaos Chatzigiannis	5	0	0	0	1	8
6	Georgios Kouleles	5	0	0	0	2	0
14	Diogenis Souras	5	0	0	0	1	0
2	Pavlos Kasampoulis	5	0	0	0	1	0
16	Marios Lybertos	5	0	0	0	1	2
15	Antonis Kanellis	5	0	0	0	1	0
12	Dimitris Malamas	1	0	0	0	0	27
1	Giorgos Fiotakis	5	0	0	0		4
25	Spyros-Dalibor Ploutsis	5	0	0	0		4

== 2010 World Championship ==
The Greece national ice hockey team competed in the 2010 IIHF World Championship Division III which was held in Luxembourg from April 14-17. The team was successful in winning the silver medal; gold went to Ireland and the host country Luxembourg won bronze

April 14; 16:30	Greece	7–1 (2–1, 1–0, 4–0)	United Arab Emirates	Patinoire de Kockelscheuer; Attendance: 131

Game reference

Ntalimpor Ploutsis
Goalies
Khaled Al Suwaidi
Ahmed Al Dhaheri
Referee:
Benny Haxelmans

2:30 – Koufis (Papadopoulous)	1 – 0
	1 – 1	13:45 – Al. Dhaheri (Al Zaabi, Al Darmaki)
14:23 – G. Kalyvas (D. Kalyvas, Papadopoulous)	2 – 1
25:55 – Koufis (D. Kalyvas, Lempesis)	3 – 1
41:37 – G. Kalyvas (D. Kalyvas, Pachos) (PP)	4 – 1
49:13 – Pachos (G. Kalyvas) (PP)	5 – 1
53:09 – Koufis (Papadopoulous) (PP)	6 – 1
55:15 – G. Kalyvas (D. Kalyvas)(PP)	7 – 1

20 min
Penalties
20 min
32
Shots
35

April 15; 16:30	Greece	1–3 (1–0, 0–3, 0–0)	Ireland	Patinoire de Kockelscheuer; Attendance: 102

Game reference

Ntalimpor Ploutsis
Goalies
Kevin Kelly
Referee:
Wilhelm Schimm

3:53 – D. Kalyvas (Papadopoulous, Tilios) (PP2)	1 – 0
	1 – 1	25:00 – Hamill (M. Morrison, O'Driscoll) (PP)
	1 – 2	32:35 – M. Morrison (Ewen, Martin)
	1 – 3	36:26 – M. Morrison (Hamill) (SH)

37 min
Penalties
30 min
15
Shots
38

April 17; 20:00	Luxembourg	1–2 (0–0, 0–1, 1–1)	Greece	Patinoire de Kockelscheuer; Attendance: 1,150

Game reference

Philippe Lepage
Goalies
Ntalimpor Ploutsis
Referee:
Wilhelm Schimm

	0 – 1	29:31 – G. Kalyvas (D. Kalyvas) (PP2)
	0 – 2	52:23 – Lambridis (Efkarpidis)
56:27 – Dessouroux (Welter) (PP2)	1 – 2

60 min
Penalties
18 min
27
Shots
21

=== Player statistics ===
#	Name	P	GP	Goals	Assists	PTS	PIM	SOG
21	Dimitris Kalyvas (C)	F	3	1	5	6	8	10
19	George Kalyvas	D	3	4	1	5	4	13
24	Nikolaos Papadopoulos	D	3	0	4	4	20	6
13	Ioannis Koufis	F	3	3	0	3	8	10
8	Iasonas Pachos	F	3	1	2	3	0	5
18	Themistoklis Lambridis	F	3	1	0	1	8	8
3	Lazaros Efkarpidis	F	3	0	1	1	0	1
11	Orestis Tilios (A)	D	3	0	1	1	2	3
22	Kostas Lembessis	D	3	0	1	1	2	5
23	Panagiotis Iatridis	D	3	0	0	1	0	1
5	Nikos Chatzigiannis	D	3	0	0	0	0	1
6	George Kouleles	F	3	0	0	0	0	0
12	Kyriakos Adamidis	F	3	0	0	0	2	2
9	Ioannis Ziakas (A)	D	3	0	0	0	2	0
10	Alexandros Rallis-Valsamas	F	3	0	0	0	25	3
14	Diogenis Souras	D	3	0	0	0	0	0

P: POSITIONS, GP: GAMED PLAYED, PTS: POINTS, PIM: PENALTY IN MINUTES, SOG: SHOTS ON GOAL

=== Goalie statistics ===
#	Name	GP	MIP	GA	SVS	SOG	SVS%	W	L
1	George Fiotakis	0	0	0	0	0	0	0	0
25	Dalibor Ploutsis	3	179:03	5	85	90	94.44	2	1

GP:Games played, MIP:Minutes played, GA:Goals against, SVS:Saves, SVS%:Saves percentage, W:Wins, L:Loss

== 2009 World Championships ==
Date	Game	Result
10.04.2009	Ireland -Greece	3:7
11.04.2009	Greece - Mongolia	5 : 0*
13.04.2009	New Zealand -Greece	4 : 3 OT
15.04.2009	Greece - Luxembourg	2:7
16.04.2009	Turkey - Greece	7:1

*Mongolia did not show due to VISA issues

=== Player statistics ===
#	Name	P	GP	Goals	Assists	PTS	PIM	SOG
21	Dimitris Kalyvas (C)	F	4	3	3	6	20	12
15	Grigoris Apostolidis	F	4	2	3	5	12	29
24	Nikolaos Papadopoulos	D	4	2	3	5	28	17
19	George Kalyvas	F	4	3	1	4	2	11
13	Ioannis Koufis	F	4	1	2	3	2	6
12	Kyriakos Adamidis	F	4	1	1	2	2	2
17	George Adamidis	F	4	0	2	2	2	1
3	Lazaros Efkarpidis	F	4	1	0	1	2	2
23	Panagiotis Iatridis	D	4	0	1	1	2	3
22	Kostas Lembessis	D	4	0	1	1	0	1
11	Orestis Tilios (A)	D	4	0	1	1	10	7
18	Themistoklis Lambridis	F	4	0	1	1	10	2
5	Nikos Chatzigiannis	D	4	0	0	0	2	2
6	George Kouleles	F	4	0	0	0	0	0
8	Iasonas Pachos	F	4	0	0	0	6	3
9	Ioannis Ziakas (A)	D	4	0	0	0	2	1
10	Alexandros Rallis-Valsamas	F	4	0	0	0	0	4
16	Viktor Mateevitsi	F	4	0	0	0	0	1

== 2008 World Championships ==
Date	Game	Result
31.03.2008	Greece - South Africa	1:5
01.04.2008	Greece - Mongolia	10:4
03.04.2009	DPR Korea - Greece	7:3
05.04.2009	Greece - Turkey	1:9
06.04.2009	Luxembourg - Greece	3-2 OT

=== Player statistics ===
#	Name	P	GP	Goals	Assists	PTS	PIM	SOG
21	Dimitris Kalyvas (C)	F	5	10	2	12	2	34
13	Ioannis Koufis	F	5	5	4	9	2	23
24	Nikolaos Papadopoulos	D	5	0	8	8	30	20
19	George Kalyvas	F	5	0	4	4	14	15
11	Orestis Tilios (A)	D	5	0	3	3	12	23
23	Panagiotis Iatridis	D	5	0	2	2	6	7
8	Iasonas Pachos	F	5	1	0	1	2	8
12	Thanasis Kesidis	F	5	1	0	1	4	19
18	Themistoklis Lambridis	F	5	0	1	1	8	5
22	Kostas Lembessis	D	5	0	1	1	6	4
6	Ioannis Ziakas (A)	D	5	0	1	1	14	4
10	Alexandros Rallis-Valsamas	F	5	0	1	1	2	5
3	Lazaros Efkarpidis	F	5	0	0	0	2	2
5	Nikos Chatzigiannis	D	5	0	0	0	2	0
7	Ioannis Giatagantzidis	F	5	0	0	0	2	0
14	Diogenis Souras	D	5	0	0	0	0	0
4	Fivos Kaminis	D	5	0	0	0	0	0
2	Grigoris Apostolidis	F	1	0	0	0	0	2

== Tournament record ==
=== World Championships ===
Year	Location	Result
1992	Johannesburg, South Africa	Bronze in Pool C2 (29th)
1993	Ankara, Turkey	2nd in Pool C qualifying Group 4 (NR)
1995	Johannesburg, South Africa	9th place in Pool C2 (38th)
1996	Metula, Israel	3rd in Pool D qualifying Group 2 (NR)
1998	Krugersdorp / Pretoria, South Africa	8th place in Pool D (40th)
1999	Krugersdorp, South Africa	8th place in Pool D (39th)
2008	Luxembourg City, Luxembourg	5th place in Div III (45th)
2009	Dunedin, New Zealand	4th place in Div III (44th)
2010	Kockelscheuer, Luxembourg	Silver in Group B of Division III (43rd)
2011	Cape Town, South Africa	5th place in Division III (45th)
2012	Erzurum, Turkey	5th place in Division III (45th)
2013	Cape Town, South Africa	5th place in Division III (45th)

=== IIHF Development Cup ===
Year	Location	Result
2024	(Slovakia) Bratislava	5th place
2025	(Andorra) Canillo	4th place

== All-time Record against other nations ==
As of 26 April 2025

Team	GP	W	T	L	GF	GA
Andorra	1	1	0	0	7	4
Argentina	1	0	0	1	4	11
Armenia (Note: Greece's first match against Armenia, within the 2008 IIHF World Championship Division III Qualification tournament, was awarded to Greece (5-0) by IIHF decision.)	1	1	0	0	5	0
Australia	1	0	0	1	2	10
Belgium	2	0	1	1	7	19
Bosnia and Herzegovina	1	1	0	0	10	1
Brazil	3	3	0	0	18	6
Colombia	1	0	0	1	0	8
Georgia	1	1	0	0	13	0
Iceland	1	1	0	0	8	6
Ireland	5	1	0	4	17	29
Israel	5	1	0	4	13	59
Liechtenstein	1	0	0	1	0	13
Lithuania	1	0	0	1	1	20
Luxembourg	7	2	0	5	17	45
Mongolia	5	5	0	0	29	7
New Zealand	4	1	0	3	16	22
North Korea	3	0	0	3	5	18
Portugal	2	0	0	2	2	17
Puerto Rico	1	0	0	1	1	11
South Africa	5	0	0	5	8	50
Spain	3	0	0	3	2	37
Turkey	9	3	0	6	36	55
United Arab Emirates	3	2	0	1	11	6
Total	67	23	1	43	232	454

== 1992 Men's World Ice Hockey Championships Group C2 ==
Here are the Results of Team Greece's first medal winning championship in 1992.

March 21, 1992	Turkey	3:15	Greece	Johannesburg, South Africa

March 23, 1992	Luxembourg	5:9	Greece	Johannesburg, South Africa

March 24, 1992	Greece	1:10	Spain	Johannesburg, South Africa

March 26, 1992	South Africa	9:4	Greece	Johannesburg, South Africa

March 27, 1992	Greece	7:4	Israel	Johannesburg, South Africa

Qualification-

December 6, 1992	Greece	10:2	Turkey	Turkey

December 7, 1992	Israel	8:1	Greece	Turkey

== Articles about the National Team ==
- NHL: Greek hockey gets back in the game By Bill Meltzer
- NHL: Team Greece winning uphill battle for survival By Bill Meltzer
- IIHF: UAE, Greece advance
- IIHF: From Abu Dhabi to the Acropolis
- IIHF: Greeks going to Luxembourg
- IIHF: Impressive Greek comeback
- IIHF: Greek hockey – against all odds By Bill Meltzer
