= 2002 Men's Ice Hockey World Championships =

2002 edition of the Men's World Ice Hockey Championships

The 2002 Men's Ice Hockey World Championships were held between 26 April and 11 May 2002 in Gothenburg, Karlstad and Jönköping, Sweden.

It was the 66th annual event, and was run by the International Ice Hockey Federation (IIHF). The competition also served as qualification for division placements in the 2003 competition.

== Championship ==
The Championship division was contested from 26 April to 11 May 2002. Participants in this tournament were placed into groups of four with the top three teams in each group advancing to the qualifying round. Teams which finished last in the group were sent to the relegation round where the top bottom teams were relegated to the 2003 Division I tournament. Within the qualifying round teams where split into two groups of six with the top four advancing to the playoff round and the bottom two eliminated from advancing. The playoff round was a knockout stage towards the gold medal game. The Championship was played in Gothenburg, Sweden. Slovakia won the gold medal game, defeating Russia 4–3. While Poland and Italy were relegated to Division I for 2003.

Final standings

1. Slovakia
2. Russia
3. Sweden
4. Finland
5. Czech Republic
6. Canada
7. United States
8. Germany
9. Ukraine
10. Switzerland
11. Latvia
12. Austria
13. Slovenia
14. Poland — relegated to Division I for 2003
15. Italy — relegated to Division I for 2003
16. Japan — Far Eastern qualifier for 2003

== Division I ==
=== Group A ===
Group A was played in Eindhoven, The Netherlands between April 14 and April 20, 2002.

Team	Pld	W	D	L	GF	GA	GD	Pts	BLR	FRA	KAZ	NED	CRO	KOR
Belarus	5	5	0	0	45	10	+35	10	—	3–1	6–4	15–4	9–0	12–1
France	5	4	0	1	27	6	+21	8	1–3	—	6–0	4–2	6–1	10–0
Kazakhstan	5	3	0	2	30	14	+16	6	4–6	0–6	—	4–2	12–0	10–0
Netherlands	5	2	0	3	19	30	−11	4	4–15	2–4	2–4	—	4–2	7–5
Croatia	5	1	0	4	6	32	−26	2	0–9	1–6	0–12	2–4	—	3–1
South Korea	5	0	0	5	7	42	−35	0	1–12	0–10	0–10	5–7	1–3	—

Source: IIHF

=== Group B ===
Group B was played in Székesfehérvár and Dunaújváros, Hungary between April 14 and April 20, 2002.

Team	Pld	W	D	L	GF	GA	GD	Pts	DEN	HUN	NOR	GBR	ROU	CHN
Denmark	5	5	0	0	40	10	+30	10	—	6–2	4–3	5–3	12–2	13–0
Hungary	5	4	0	1	19	9	+10	8	2–6	—	3–1	4–1	4–1	6–0
Norway	5	3	0	2	26	11	+15	6	3–4	1–3	—	2–1	8–1	12–2
Great Britain	5	2	0	3	18	16	+2	4	3–5	1–4	1–2	—	5–2	8–3
Romania	5	1	0	4	10	31	−21	2	2–12	1–4	1–8	2–5	—	4–2
China	5	0	0	5	7	43	−36	0	0–13	0–6	2–12	3–8	2–4	—

Source: IIHF

Belarus and Denmark are promoted to the 2003 Men's World Ice Hockey Championships, while China and South Korea are relegated to Division II.

== Division II ==
To integrate a new Division III being added for the 2003 Championships, the bottom team in each pool was relegated to the 2003 inaugural Division III competition.

=== Group A ===
Group A was played in Cape Town, South Africa between March 31 and April 6, 2002.

Team	Pld	W	D	L	GF	GA	GD	Pts	EST	BEL	ISR	AUS	RSA	TUR
Estonia	5	5	0	0	74	7	+67	10	—	4–3	11–0	20–4	15–0	24–0
Belgium	5	4	0	1	37	11	+26	8	3–4	—	3–1	9–4	10–0	12–2
Israel	5	3	0	2	14	22	−8	6	0–11	1–3	—	6–5	4–2	3–1
Australia	5	2	0	3	32	39	−7	4	4–20	4–9	5–6	—	8–4	11–0
South Africa	5	1	0	4	13	37	−24	2	0–15	0–10	2–4	4–8	—	7–0
Turkey	5	0	0	5	3	57	−54	0	0–24	2–12	1–3	0–11	0–7	—

Source: IIHF

=== Group B ===
Group B was played in Novi Sad, Yugoslavia between March 25 and March 31, 2002.

Team	Pld	W	D	L	GF	GA	GD	Pts	LTU	YUG	ESP	BUL	ISL	LUX
Lithuania	5	5	0	0	71	6	+65	10	—	7–1	11–2	13–3	20–0	20–0
Yugoslavia	5	4	0	1	34	10	+24	8	1–7	—	7–0	5–2	8–1	13–0
Spain	5	3	0	2	28	22	+6	6	2–11	0–7	—	5–3	11–1	10–0
Bulgaria	5	2	0	3	30	29	+1	4	3–13	2–5	3–5	—	5–4	17–2
Iceland	5	1	0	4	14	44	−30	2	0–20	1–8	1–11	4–5	—	8–0
Luxembourg	5	0	0	5	2	68	−66	0	0–20	0–13	0–10	2–17	0–8	—

Source: IIHF

Estonia and Lithuania are promoted to Division I, while Luxembourg and Turkey are relegated to Division III.

== Division II Qualification ==
This Division II Qualification tournament took place between April 11 and April 13, 2002, in Mexico City, Mexico to determine the two teams that would earn promotion to Division II for 2003 Division II.

Team	Pld	W	D	L	GF	GA	GD	Pts
North Korea	2	2	0	0	18	4	+14	4
Mexico	2	0	1	1	7	13	−6	1
New Zealand	2	0	1	1	9	17	−8	1

Source: IIHF

All times local

April 11, 2002; 20:00	North Korea	11–3	New Zealand

April 12, 2002; 20:00	Mexico	1–7	North Korea

April 13, 2002; 20:00	New Zealand	6–6	Mexico

North Korea and Mexico are promoted to Division II.
