= North Korea men's national ice hockey team =

North Korea
- The flag of North Korea is the badge used on the players' jerseys.
- Association: Ice Hockey Association of the DPR Korea
- General manager: Ri Un-chol
- Head coach: Ri Pong-il
- Assistants: Jong Song-il; Pak Il
- Captain: Kim Chung-hyok
- Most games: Kim Kwang-ho (63)
- Top scorer: Hong Chun-rim (51)
- Most points: Hong Chun-rim (89)
- Team colors
- IIHF code: PRK

Ranking
- Current IIHF: 49 ▲3 (3 June 2026)
- Highest IIHF: 36 (2005–06)
- Lowest IIHF: 56 (2023–24)

First international
- Italy 11–2 North Korea (Grenoble, France; 8 March 1974)

Biggest win
- North Korea 22–1 Mongolia (Yerevan, Armenia; 14 April 2010); North Korea 22–1 Georgia (Luxembourg, Luxembourg; 6 April 2014)

Biggest defeat
- France 24–1 North Korea (Budapest, Hungary; 15 March 1983)

IIHF World Championships
- Appearances: 30 (first in 1974)
- Best result: 21st (1990)

Asian Winter Games
- Appearances: 3 (first in 1986)
- Best result: 4th (1986, 1990)

International record (W–L–T)
- 83–115–6

- North Korea men's national ice hockey team
- Hangul: 조선민주주의인민공화국 아이스하키 국가대표팀
- Hanja: 朝鮮民主主義人民共和國 아이스하키 國歌代表팀
- RR: Joseon minjujuui inmin gonghwaguk aiseuhaki gukgadaepyotim
- MR: Chosŏn minjujuŭi inmin konghwaguk aisŭhak'i kukkadaep'yot'im

The North Korea national ice hockey team (Korean: 조선민주주의인민공화국 아이스하키 국가대표팀; recognized as DPR Korea by IIHF) is the national men's ice hockey team of the Democratic People's Republic of Korea (North Korea), and represent the country in IIHF competition. They withdrew from the 2007 World Championships, and therefore were automatically relegated to Division III in the 2008 edition, where they finished first. They then played in Division II during the 2009 edition, and finished last bringing them back down to Division III for 2010. They are currently ranked 54th in the IIHF World Rankings and 21st in the AIH Rankings of Asian national teams.

== History ==
The game of ice hockey in North Korea became popular during the 1950s when Soviet and Chinese workers taught the game and its rules in the capital city of Pyongyang. The Ice Hockey Association of the DPR Korea was founded in 1955. North Korea became a member of the IIHF on 8 August 1964. North Korea's first national championship was held in 1956 and was won by Amnokgang Pyongyang. The North Korea national team did not make its debut until 1974, when it competed in the C pool of the World Championships. The team lost its first game to Italy 11–2 on 8 March 1974, but rebounded for a surprising victory over China.

== Withdrawal from 2011, 2022 and 2023 IIHF tournaments ==
DPR Korea announced that their men's and women's teams were not going to compete in IIHF competition due to financial reasons. The men's team was scheduled to participate at the Div II championships in Melbourne, Australia, while the women's team was scheduled to participate at the Div II championship in Caen, France. DPR Korea men's team also withdrew from Division III A tournaments in 2022 and 2023 due to the COVID-19 pandemic, and therefore was not active until 2024.

== Tournament participation ==
=== World Championships ===
- 1974 – 22nd place (8th in Pool C)
- 1981 – 23rd place (7th in Pool C)
- 1983 – 24th place (8th in Pool C)
- 1985 – 23rd place (7th in Pool C)
- 1986 – 23rd place (7th in Pool C)
- 1987 – 22nd place (6th in Pool C)
- 1989 – 22nd place (6th in Pool C)
- 1990 – 21st place (5th in Pool C)
- 1991 – 23rd place (7th in Pool C)
- 1992 – 22nd place (2nd in Pool C, Group A)
- 1993 – 26th place (6th in Pool C)
- 2002 – 41st place (1st in Division II qualification)
- 2003 – 35th place (4th in Division II, Group B)
- 2004 – 34th place (3rd in Division II, Group B)
- 2005 – 34th place (3rd in Division II, Group B)
- 2006 – 36th place (4th in Division II, Group B)
- 2007 – Withdrew from tournament, relegated to Division III
- 2008 – 41st place (1st in Division III) Promoted to Division II
- 2009 – 39th place (6th in Division II, Group A) Relegated to Division III
- 2010 – 42nd place (1st in Division III, Group B) Promoted to Division II
- 2011 – Withdrew from Division II
- 2012 – 42nd place (2nd in Division III)
- 2013 – 42nd place (2nd in Division III)
- 2014 – 42nd place (2nd in Division III)
- 2015 – 41st place (1st in Division III) Promoted to Division II B
- 2016 – 39th place (5th in Division II B)
- 2017 – 38th place (4th in Division II B)
- 2018 – 38th place (4th in Division II B)
- 2019 – 40th place (6th in Division II, Group B) Relegated to Division III A
- 2020 – Cancelled due to the COVID-19 pandemic
- 2021 – All lower division tournaments cancelled due to the COVID-19 pandemic
- 2022 – Withdrew from Division III A due to the COVID-19 pandemic
- 2023 – Withdrew from Division III A, relegated to Division III B
- 2024 – 48th place (2nd in Division III B)
- 2025 – 48th place (2nd in Division III B)
- 2026 – 48th place (2nd in Division III B)

=== Asian Winter Games ===
- 1986 – 4th place
- 1990 – 4th place
- 2007 – 5th place

== All-time record against other nations ==
As of 19 April 2026

Opponent	Played	Won	Drawn	Lost	GF	GA
Armenia (Note: North Korea' first two matches against Armenia were additionally changed to 5–0 wins for the North Korea by IIHF decision. Original results were 9-2 and 15–0, respectively.This also concerned first two matches against North Korea; the original results were a 6-7 loss and a 5-2 victory. Both matches took place within 2010 IIHF World Championship Division III.)	2	2	0	0	10	0
Australia	8	3	1	4	30	42
Austria	1	0	0	1	0	10
Belgium	8	6	0	2	36	15
Bosnia and Herzegovina	2	1	0	1	15	4
Bulgaria	16	5	1	10	43	76
China	18	3	1	14	47	112
Denmark	7	0	0	7	12	52
Estonia	1	0	0	1	1	16
France	4	0	0	4	6	65
Georgia	3	3	0	0	43	9
Great Britain	3	1	0	2	9	24
Greece	3	3	0	0	18	5
Hong Kong	5	5	0	0	44	18
Hungary	12	5	0	7	38	71
Iceland	4	1	0	3	11	15
Iran	1	1	0	0	9	4
Ireland	2	2	0	0	7	1
Israel	8	1	2	5	31	45
Italy	1	0	0	1	2	11
Japan	10	0	0	10	15	78
Latvia	1	0	0	1	0	4
Lithuania	1	0	0	1	0	9
Luxembourg	7	6	0	1	29	12
Malaysia	1	1	0	0	15	0
Mexico	8	3	0	5	23	35
Mongolia	5	5	0	0	66	12
Netherlands	3	0	0	3	2	25
New Zealand	8	4	0	4	38	42
Philippines	3	3	0	0	24	9
Romania	6	0	0	6	14	51
Serbia	4	0	0	4	5	31
Singapore	2	2	0	0	21	5
South Africa	4	3	0	1	18	8
South Korea	12	6	1	5	64	40
Spain	5	2	0	3	20	32
Switzerland	1	0	0	1	0	15
Turkey	4	3	0	1	25	12
United Arab Emirates	4	4	0	0	33	6
Ukraine	1	0	0	1	2	15
Uzbekistan	1	0	0	1	3	20
Yugoslavia	4	0	0	4	7	38
Total	204	83	6	115	837	1103
