= 1998 Men's Ice Hockey World Championships =

1998 edition of the Men's World Ice Hockey Championship

- Dates: March – May 1998

The 1998 Men's Ice Hockey World Championships was the 62nd such event sanctioned by the International Ice Hockey Federation (IIHF). Teams representing 40 countries participated in several levels of competition. The competition also served as qualifications for group placements in the 1999 competition.

== World Championship Group A ==
The Championship took place between sixteen teams in Switzerland.

- Austria (2nd, Qualification Tournament)
- Belarus (Promoted from Group B)
- Canada
- Czech Republic
- Finland
- France
- Germany
- Italy
- Japan (Far East Qualifier)
- Kazakhstan (1st, Qualification Tournament)
- Latvia
- Russia
- Slovakia
- Sweden
- Switzerland (Host)
- United States

== World Championship Group B (Slovenia) ==
Played 15–26 April in Ljubljana and Jesenice. Norway, as the next year's host, had already been awarded a spot in Group A. In addition, the top three other finishers advanced to qualifying tournaments for inclusion in Group A. The Estonians came into the final game knowing they could lose by four and still advance. Trailing by three after two, they hung on to edge the Danish team in the standings.

Pos	Team	Pld	W	D	L	GF	GA	GD	Pts
17	Ukraine	7	7	0	0	38	13	+25	14
18	Slovenia	7	5	1	1	28	15	+13	11
19	Estonia	7	3	1	3	15	19	−4	7
20	Denmark	7	2	3	2	18	24	−6	7
21	Norway	7	3	0	4	21	19	+2	6
22	Great Britain	7	3	0	4	32	27	+5	6
23	Poland	7	2	1	4	21	28	−7	5
24	Netherlands	7	0	0	7	12	40	−28	0

Ukraine, Slovenia, and Estonia all advanced to qualifiers for Group A, the Netherlands was relegated to Group C. Norway was promoted to Group A as hosts.

15 April	Estonia	2–1	Norway

15 April	Slovenia	3–0	Poland

15 April	Great Britain	1–6	Ukraine

15 April	Netherlands	0–1	Denmark

16 April	Netherlands	2–4	Estonia

16 April	Denmark	1–7	Great Britain

17 April	Ukraine	6–3	Poland

17 April	Slovenia	4–3	Norway

18 April	Poland	5–5	Denmark

18 April	Norway	2–5	Ukraine

19 April	Slovenia	6–1	Netherlands

19 April	Great Britain	4–5	Estonia

20 April	Ukraine	10–1	Netherlands

20 April	Denmark	2–1	Norway

21 April	Poland	3–0	Estonia

21 April	Slovenia	5–3	Great Britain

22 April	Estonia	3–3	Denmark

22 April	Poland	3–4	Great Britain

23 April	Slovenia	3–4	Ukraine

23 April	Norway	4–1	Netherlands

24 April	Great Britain	3–4	Norway

24 April	Estonia	1–3	Ukraine

25 April	Slovenia	4–4	Denmark

25 April	Netherlands	4–5	Poland

26 April	Great Britain	10–3	Netherlands

26 April	Denmark	2–4	Ukraine

26 April	Norway	6–2	Poland

26 April	Slovenia	3–0	Estonia

== World Championship Group C (Hungary) ==
Played 22–28 March in Budapest, Székesfehérvár and Dunaújváros.

=== Group 1 ===
Pos	Team	Pld	W	D	L	GF	GA	GD	Pts
1	Romania	3	3	0	0	20	7	+13	6
2	Lithuania	3	2	0	1	8	11	−3	4
3	Yugoslavia	3	0	1	2	4	8	−4	1
4	Croatia	3	0	1	2	4	10	−6	1

22 March	Romania	5–3	Yugoslavia

22 March	Lithuania	3–2	Croatia

23 March	Lithuania	2–0	Yugoslavia

23 March	Croatia	1–6	Romania

25 March	Croatia	1–1	Yugoslavia

25 March	Lithuania	3–9	Romania

=== Group 2 ===
Pos	Team	Pld	W	D	L	GF	GA	GD	Pts
1	Hungary	3	3	0	0	19	2	+17	6
2	China	3	2	0	1	14	11	+3	4
3	South Korea	3	1	0	2	1	12	−11	2
4	Spain	3	0	0	3	5	14	−9	0

22 March	Hungary	7–1	China

22 March	Spain	0–1	South Korea

23 March	Hungary	6–1	Spain

23 March	China	6–0	South Korea

25 March	Hungary	6–0	South Korea

25 March	China	7–4	Spain

=== Final Round 25–28 Place ===
Pos	Team	Pld	W	D	L	GF	GA	GD	Pts
25	Hungary	3	3	0	0	24	3	+21	6
26	Romania	3	2	0	1	20	9	+11	4
27	Lithuania	3	1	0	2	8	27	−19	2
28	China	3	0	0	3	8	21	−13	0

Hungary was promoted to Group B.

27 March	Romania	9–3	China

27 March	Hungary	14–0	Lithuania

28 March	China	4–5	Lithuania

28 March	Hungary	3–2	Romania

=== Consolation Round 29–32 Place ===
Pos	Team	Pld	W	D	L	GF	GA	GD	Pts
29	Croatia	3	1	2	0	8	6	+2	4
30	Yugoslavia	3	1	2	0	7	6	+1	4
31	South Korea	3	1	0	2	4	6	−2	2
32	Spain	3	0	2	1	7	8	−1	2

Spain was relegated to Group D. The Spanish led by two in both their final games, but tied them, and their earlier loss to South Korea sealed their fate.

27 March	South Korea	1–3	Croatia

27 March	Yugoslavia	3–3	Spain

28 March	Spain	4–4	Croatia

28 March	Yugoslavia	3–2	South Korea

== World Championship Group D (South Africa) ==
Played 27 March to 2 April in Krugersdorp and Pretoria.

=== Group 1 ===
Pos	Team	Pld	W	D	L	GF	GA	GD	Pts
1	Israel	3	3	0	0	29	6	+23	6
2	Belgium	3	2	0	1	22	10	+12	4
3	South Africa	3	1	0	2	15	15	0	2
4	Greece	3	0	0	3	6	41	−35	0

27 March	Israel	16–2	Greece

27 March	South Africa	3–5	Belgium

28 March	Belgium	14–2	Greece

28 March	South Africa	1–8	Israel

30 March	Israel	5–3	Belgium

30 March	South Africa	11–2	Greece

=== Group 2 ===
Pos	Team	Pld	W	D	L	GF	GA	GD	Pts
1	Bulgaria	3	2	1	0	42	5	+37	5
2	Australia	3	2	1	0	28	6	+22	5
3	Turkey	3	1	0	2	5	37	−32	2
4	New Zealand	3	0	0	3	5	32	−27	0

27 March	Australia	14–1	Turkey

27 March	Bulgaria	18–1	New Zealand

28 March	Bulgaria	20–0	Turkey

28 March	New Zealand	1–10	Australia

30 March	Turkey	4–3	New Zealand

30 March	Australia	4–4	Bulgaria

=== Final Round 33–36 Place ===
Pos	Team	Pld	W	D	L	GF	GA	GD	Pts
33	Bulgaria	3	2	1	0	12	6	+6	5
34	Australia	3	1	1	1	11	13	−2	3
35	Israel	3	1	0	2	10	13	−3	2
36	Belgium	3	1	0	2	9	10	−1	2

Bulgaria was promoted to Group C.

1 April	Bulgaria	4–0	Belgium

1 April	Israel	3–6	Australia

2 April	Australia	1–6	Belgium

2 April	Israel	2–4	Bulgaria

=== Consolation Round 37–40 Place ===
Pos	Team	Pld	W	D	L	GF	GA	GD	Pts
37	South Africa	3	3	0	0	28	7	+21	6
38	New Zealand	3	1	0	2	13	11	+2	2
39	Turkey	3	1	0	2	11	22	−11	2
40	Greece	3	1	0	2	11	23	−12	2

1 April	South Africa	5–2	New Zealand

1 April	Turkey	4–7	Greece

2 April	Greece	2–8	New Zealand

2 April	South Africa	12–3	Turkey

== See also ==
- 1998 World Junior Ice Hockey Championships
