= South Africa men's national ice hockey team =

South Africa
- Nickname: Rhinos
- Association: South African Ice Hockey Federation
- General manager: Christiaan Venter
- Head coach: Gavin Smith
- Assistants: Mogamat Kamish
- Captain: Uthman Samaai
- Most games: Jack Valadas (100)
- Top scorer: Uthman Samaai (42)
- Most points: Uthman Samaai (89)
- Home stadium: GrandWest Ice Station
- Team colors
- IIHF code: RSA

Ranking
- Current IIHF: 37 (3 June 2026)
- Highest IIHF: 37 (2003)
- Lowest IIHF: 52 (2022)

First international
- Yugoslavia 12–3 South Africa (Lausanne, Switzerland; 3 March 1961)

Biggest win
- South Africa 33–1 Armenia (Mexico City, Mexico; 7 March 2005)

Biggest defeat
- Kazakhstan 32–0 South Africa (Bled, Slovenia; 16 March 1993)

IIHF World Championships
- Appearances: 34 (first in 1961)
- Best result: 19th (1961, 1966)

International record (W–L–T)
- 65–105–1

The South Africa national ice hockey team is the national men's ice hockey team of South Africa. The team is controlled by the South African Ice Hockey Federation and has been a member of the International Ice Hockey Federation (IIHF) since 25 February 1937. As of 27 May 2024, South Africa is currently ranked 47th in the IIHF World Ranking and competes in Division III of the IIHF World Championships. South Africa is the only African-based team that competes in IIHF tournaments.

The current crest on the team jersey consists of a rhino, with the previous one being the crest of the National Sports Council or various iterations of the national flag.

== World Championship record ==
Year	City	Country	Result
1961	Geneva & Lausanne	Switzerland	5th place in Group C (19th)
1966	Jesenice	Yugoslavia	3rd place in Group C (19th)
1992	Johannesburg	South Africa	2nd place in Group C2 (28th)
1993	Bled	Slovenia	12th place in Group C (32nd)
1994	Barcelona	Spain	8th place in Group C2 (35th)
1995	Johannesburg	South Africa	8th place in Group C2 (37th)
1997	Ankara	Turkey	1st Group E (NR)
1998	Krugersdorp	South Africa	5th place in Group D (37th)
1999	Krugersdorp	South Africa	5th place in Group D (37th)
2000	Reykjavík	Iceland	4th place in Group D (37th)
2001	Majadahonda	Spain	4th place in Division IIA (36th)
2002	Cape Town	South Africa	5th place in Division II Group A (37th)
2003	Seoul	South Korea	5th place in Division II Group A (38th)
2004	Elektrėnai	Lithuania	6th place in Division II Group B (40th)
2005	Mexico City	Mexico	Silver in Division III (42nd)
2006	Sofia	Bulgaria	6th place in Division II Group A (40th)
2007	Dundalk	Ireland	4th place in Division III (44th)
2008	Kockelscheuer	Luxembourg	Silver in Division III (42nd)
2009	Sofia	Bulgaria	6th in Division II Group B (40th)
2010	Yerevan	Armenia	Bronze in Division III Group B (44th)
2011	Cape Town	South Africa	Silver in Division III (42nd)
2012	Sofia	Bulgaria	6th in Division II Group B (39th)
2013	Cape Town	South Africa	Gold in Division III (41st)
2014	Jaca	Spain	5th in Division II Group B (39th)
2015	Cape Town	South Africa	6th in Division II Group B (40th)
2016	Istanbul	Turkey	Silver in Division III (42nd)
2017	Sofia	Bulgaria	5th in Division III (45th)
2018	Cape Town	South Africa	5th in Division III (45th)
2019	Sofia	Bulgaria	6th in Division III (46th)
2020	Cape Town	South Africa	Cancelled due to the COVID-19 pandemic
2021	Cape Town	South Africa	All lower division tournaments cancelled due to the COVID-19 pandemic
2022	Cape Town	South Africa	Gold in Division III Group B (42nd)
2023	Cape Town	South Africa	Bronze in Division III Group A (43rd)
2024	Bishkek	Kyrgyzstan	5th in Division III Group A (45th)
2025	Istanbul	Turkey	4th in Division III Group A (44th)
2026	Cape Town	South Africa	4th in Division III Group A (44th)

== All-time record against other national teams ==
Defunct national teams are listed in italics.
Last match update: 19 April 2026

Opponent	Played	Won	Tied	Lost	Goals For	Goals Against	Diff	Win %
Armenia (Note: South Africa's second match against Armenia was additionally changed to 5–0 win for South Africa by IIHF decision. Original results was a 2–9 win for Armenia. The match took place within 2010 IIHF World Championship Division III.)	2	2	0	0	38	1	+37	100.00%
Australia	7	0	0	7	23	63	−40	0.00%
Belgium	10	1	0	9	17	88	−71	10.00%
Bosnia and Herzegovina	6	6	0	0	36	10	+26	100.00%
Bulgaria	8	1	0	7	14	54	−40	12.50%
China	3	0	0	3	5	17	–12	0.00%
Chinese Taipei	4	2	0	2	19	21	–2	50.00%
Croatia	1	0	0	1	1	11	–10	0.00%
Denmark	2	0	0	2	2	15	–13	0.00%
Estonia	3	0	0	3	3	51	−48	0.00%
France	1	0	0	1	2	11	−9	0.00%
Georgia	4	3	0	1	22	9	+13	88.00%
Greece	5	5	0	0	50	8	+42	100.00%
Hong Kong	2	2	0	0	15	1	+14	100.00%
Hungary	4	0	0	4	7	57	−50	0.00%
Iceland	3	2	0	1	14	15	–1	66.67%
Ireland	3	2	0	1	13	11	+2	66.67%
Israel	8	1	0	7	21	46	−25	12.50%
Italy	2	0	0	2	2	35	−33	0.00%
Kazakhstan	1	0	0	1	0	32	−32	0.00%
Kyrgyzstan	2	0	0	2	3	15	−12	0.00%
Lithuania	1	0	0	1	1	16	−15	0.00%
Luxembourg	12	7	0	5	61	29	+32	58.33%
Mexico	9	3	0	6	34	30	+4	33.33%
Mongolia	5	5	0	0	51	9	+41	100.00%
Netherlands	1	0	0	1	4	8	−4	0.00%
New Zealand	13	9	1	3	56	38	+18	69.23%
North Korea	4	1	0	3	8	18	−20	25.00%
Romania	2	0	0	2	3	33	−30	0.00%
Serbia	3	0	0	3	10	40	−30	0.00%
Slovenia	1	0	0	1	0	29	−29	0.00%
South Korea	5	0	0	5	8	46	−38	0.00%
Spain	7	0	0	7	10	67	−57	0.00%
Thailand	5	1	0	4	16	25	–9	20.00%
Turkey	14	9	0	5	111	47	+64	64.29%
Turkmenistan	5	2	0	3	24	26	−2	40.00%
United Arab Emirates	2	2	0	0	23	0	+23	100.00%
Yugoslavia	1	0	0	1	3	12	−9	0.00%
Total	171	65	1	105	727	1 053	–326	38.01%

== All-time record against other clubs and B teams ==
Last match update: 28 March 2012

Opponent	Played	Won	Lost	Tied	For	Goals For	Goals Against	Win %
(Austria) WEV Vienna	5	1	3	1	16	33	−17	20.00%
(Switzerland) EHC Basel	1	0	1	0	4	11	−7	0.00%
(Switzerland) HC Lugano	1	0	1	0	4	9	−5	0.00%
Yugoslavia B	1	0	1	0	1	4	−3	0.00%
(Romania) Steaua Rangers	2	0	2	0	6	15	−9	0.00%
Total	10	1	8	1	31	72	-41	16.81%
