= 2013 IIHF World Championship Division III =

International ice hockey tournament

Tournament details
- Host countries: South Africa; United Arab Emirates
- Venue(s): 2 (in 2 host cities)
- Dates: 15 – 21 April 2013; 14 – 17 October 2012
- Teams: 10

The 2013 IIHF World Championship Division III was an international Ice hockey tournament run by the International Ice Hockey Federation. Group A was contested in Cape Town, South Africa, from 15 to 21 April 2013 and the qualification tournament was contested in Abu Dhabi, United Arab Emirates, from 14 to 17 October 2012.

== Participants ==
=== Group A ===
Team	Qualification
South Africa	Host, placed 6th in Division II B last year and was relegated.
North Korea	Placed 2nd in Division III last year.
Luxembourg	Placed 3rd in Division III last year.
Ireland	Placed 4th in Division III last year.
United Arab Emirates	Placed 1st in the qualification tournament.
Greece	Placed 2nd in the qualification tournament.

=== Qualification tournament ===
Team	Qualification
Georgia	Did not participate in 2012.
Greece	Placed 5th in Division III last year.
Mongolia	Placed 6th in Division III last year.
United Arab Emirates	Host, did not participate in 2012.

== Venues ==
Group A was played in Grandwest Ice Arena, Cape Town. The qualification tournament was played in Abu Dhabi Arena, Abu Dhabi.

Grandwest Ice Arena Capacity: 1,014	Abu Dhabi Arena Capacity: 1,200
South Africa – Cape Town	United Arab Emirates – Abu Dhabi

== Officials ==
The IIHF selected 7 referees and 12 linesmen to work the 2013 IIHF World Championship DIV III.
Division III has 4 referees and 7 linesman. Division III Qualification had 3 referees and 5 linesman.

They were the following:

2013 IIHF Ice Hockey World Championship Division III in South Africa

Referees

- (Croatia) Vedran Krcelić
- (Finland) Mikko Kaukokari
- (Norway) Stian Halm
- (Romania) Marius Iliescu

Linesmen

- (Belgium) Maarten van den Acker
- (Iceland) Sindri Gunnarsson
- (Latvia) Elvijs Trankalis
- (Lithuania) Tomas Lauksedis
- (Netherlands) Ramon Sterkens
- (South Africa) Jonathan Burger
- (South Africa) Ryan Marsh

2013 IIHF Ice Hockey World Championship Division III Qualification in the United Arab Emirates

Referees

- (Austria) Ladislav Smetana
- (Denmark) Rasmus Toppel
- (Serbia) Djordje Fazekas

Linesmen

- (Bulgaria) Todor Krastev
- (Lithuania) Benas Jaksys
- (Netherlands) Louis Beelen
- (Spain) Alejandro Garcia Banos
- (Switzerland) Michael Rohrer

== Qualification tournament ==
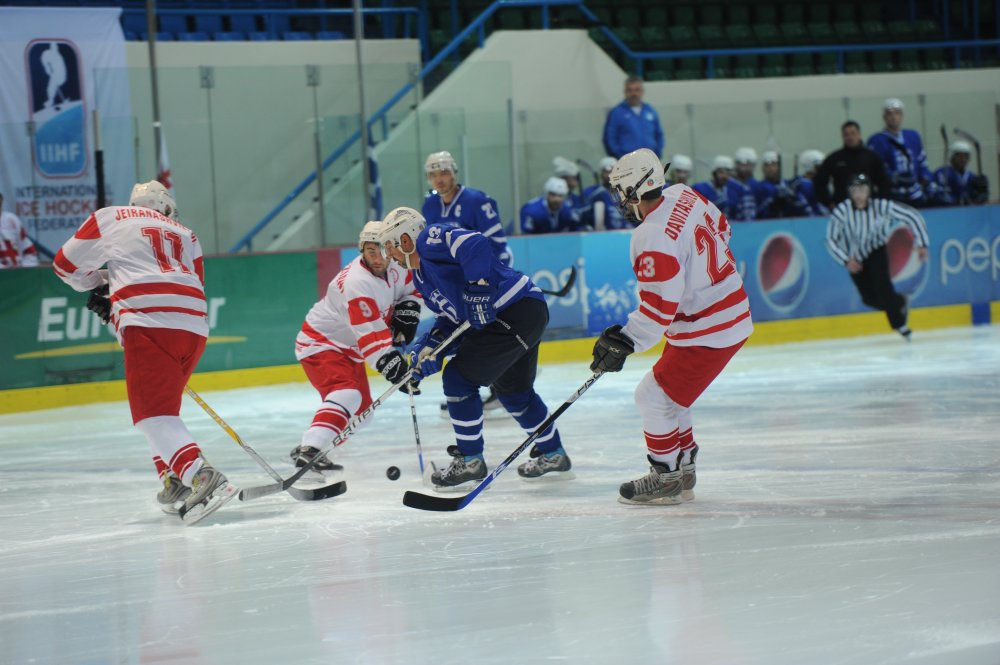
The match between Georgia and Greece. Greece won the match 13-0.

=== Standings ===
Team	Pld	W	OTW	OTL	L	GF	GA	GD	Pts	Qualification
United Arab Emirates	3	3	0	0	0	14	3	+11	9	Qualified to Division III for 2013
Greece	3	2	0	0	1	18	4	+14	6	Qualified to Division III for 2013
Mongolia	3	1	0	0	2	10	8	+2	3	
Georgia	3	0	0	0	3	1	28	−27	0	

Source: IIHF

=== Fixtures and results ===
All times local (UTC+4).

14 October 2012; 16:00	Mongolia	6–0 (1–0, 2–0, 3–0)	Georgia	Abu Dhabi Arena, Abu Dhabi; Attendance: 70

Game reference

Munkhbold Bayarsaikhan
Baatarkhuu Bazarvaani
Goalies
Kakha Ambrolava
Referee:
(Serbia) Djordje Fazekas
Linesmen:
(Netherlands) Louis Beelen
(Spain) Alejandro Garcia Baños

B. Jargalsaikhan (M. Namjil) – 12:01	1–0
B. Jargalsaikhan (M. Namjil) – 21:11	2–0
M. Enkhtur (T. Ganbold) (SH) – 27:51	3–0
M. Enkhtur – 42:48	4–0
M. Namjil (M. Enkhtur) (PP) – 46:08	5–0
B. Munkhbayar (Z. Dorjsuren) – 57:31	6–0

26 min
Penalties
4 min
41
Shots
13

14 October 2012; 19:30	United Arab Emirates	2–0 (1–0, 1–0, 0–0)	Greece	Abu Dhabi Arena, Abu Dhabi; Attendance: 357

Game reference
Khaled Al Suwaidi	Goalies	Ntalimpor Ploutsis	Referee: (Germany) Ladislav Smetana; Linesmen: (Lithuania) Benas Jaksys (Switzerland) Michaël Rohrer
J. Al Dhaheri (S. Al Mheiri) (PP) – 15:34 / 1–0; M. Al Mazrouei (J. Al Dhaheri) – 34:07 / 2–0			Referee: (Germany) Ladislav Smetana; Linesmen: (Lithuania) Benas Jaksys (Switzerland) Michaël Rohrer
10 min	Penalties	12 min	Referee: (Germany) Ladislav Smetana; Linesmen: (Lithuania) Benas Jaksys (Switzerland) Michaël Rohrer
39	Shots	25	Referee: (Germany) Ladislav Smetana; Linesmen: (Lithuania) Benas Jaksys (Switzerland) Michaël Rohrer

15 October 2012; 16:00	Greece	13–0 (4–0, 7–0, 2–0)	Georgia	Abu Dhabi Arena, Abu Dhabi; Attendance: 67

Game reference

Ntalimpor Ploutsis
Goalies
Kakha Ambrolava
Referee:
(Denmark) Rasmus Toppel
Linesmen:
(Spain) Alejandro Garcia Baños
(Bulgaria) Todor Krastev

D. Malamas – 01:47	1–0
I. Koufis (D. Kalyvas, O. Tilios) – 02:58	2–0
D. Kalyvas (A. Valsamas-Rallis, L. Efkarpidis) (PP) – 06:10	3–0
G. Kalyvas (O. Tilios) – 10:26	4–0
D. Malamas (L. Efkarpidis) – 27:34	5–0
I. Koufis (O. Tilios, G. Kalyvas) – 28:35	6–0
I. Koufis (D. Kalyvas, N. Papadopoulos) – 33:29	7–0
N. Papadopoulos (G. Adamidis) – 34:42	8–0
D. Kalyvas (I. Koufis, G. Kalyvas) – 35:47	9–0
I. Ziakas (N. Papadopoulos, K. Adamidis) – 36:22	10–0
A. Valsamas-Rallis (SH) – 37:12	11–0
G. Kouleles (L. Efkarpidis, K. Adamidis) (PP) – 42:05	12–0
I. Koufis – 46:50	13–0

22 min
Penalties
12 min
41
Shots
19

15 October 2012; 19:30	Mongolia	2–3 (0–1, 1–2, 1–0)	United Arab Emirates	Abu Dhabi Arena, Abu Dhabi; Attendance: 246

Game reference

Munkhbold Bayarsaikhan
Goalies
Khaled Al Suwaidi
Referee:
(Serbia) Djordje Fazekas
Linesmen:
(Netherlands) Louis Beelen
(Lithuania) Benas Jaksys

	0–1	01:47 – J. Dhaheri (M. Al Mazrouei)
M. Namjil – 25:01	1–1
	1–2	25:51 – M. Al Mazrouei (PP)
	1–3	28:47 – M. Al Shamisi (O. Al Shamisi) (PP)
T. Baatarkhuu (B. Zorigt) – 59:52	2–3

63 min
Penalties
32 min
14
Shots
55

17 October 2012; 16:00	Greece	5–2 (1–1, 1–1, 3–0)	Mongolia	Abu Dhabi Arena, Abu Dhabi; Attendance: 175

Game reference

Ntalimpor Ploutsis
Goalies
Munkhbold Bayarsaikhan
Referee:
(Germany) Ladislav Smetana
Linesmen:
(Lithuania) Benas Jaksys
(Bulgaria) Todor Krastev

A. Valsamas-Rallis – 07:24	1–0
	1–1	17:58 – B. Bayajikh (E. Altansan)
D. Kalyvas (N. Papadopoulos) (PP) – 21:07	2–1
	2–2	39:36 – M. Namjil (O-E. Zorigod) (SH)
I. Koufis – 41:05	3–2
A. Valsamas-Rallis (D. Malamas) – 49:24	4–2
I. Koufis (D. Kalyvas) – 59:35	5–2

8 min
Penalties
40 min
44
Shots
25

17 October 2012; 19:30	Georgia	1–9 (1–1, 0–4, 0–4)	United Arab Emirates	Abu Dhabi Arena, Abu Dhabi; Attendance: 247

Game reference

Kakha Ambrolava
Alexander Vashakidze
Goalies
Ahmed Al Dhaheri
Referee:
(Denmark) Rasmus Toppel
Linesmen:
(Netherlands) Louis Beelen
(Switzerland) Michaël Rohrer

G. Jeiranashvili (A. Geperidze) – 14:54	1–0
	1–1	06:33 – A. Al Haddad (F. Al Blooshi)
	1–2	21:10 – J. Al Dhaheri (S. Al Mheiri, M. Al Mazrouei)
	1–3	29:57 – M. Al Mazrouei (J. Al Dhaheri, M. Al Shamisi)
	1–4	30:38 – A. Al Sarour (A. Al Haddad, M. Al Shamisi)
	1–5	48:57 – O. Al Shamisi (Y. Al Jneibi)
	1–6	44:18 – S. Al Mheiri (M. Al Zaabi, M. Al Dhaheri)
	1–7	51:03 – E. Bu Debs (A. Al Haddad)
	1–8	54:27 – S. Al Mheiri (J. Al Dhaheri, M. Al Mazrouei)
	1–9	59:30 – A. Al Haddad

4 min
Penalties
6 min
12
Shots
44

=== Statistics ===
==== Top 10 scorers ====
Pos	Player	Country	GP	G	A	Pts	+/−	PIM
1	Ioannis Koufis	Greece	2	6	1	7	+7	2
2	Juma Al Dhaheri	United Arab Emirates	3	3	3	6	+4	4
2	Mubarak Al Mazrouei	United Arab Emirates	3	3	3	6	+5	6
2	Dimitrios Kalyvas	Greece	3	3	3	6	+6	14
5	Mishigsuren Namjil	Mongolia	3	5	2	5	+3	14
6	Alexandros Valsamas-Rallis	Greece	3	3	1	4	+5	0
7	Ali Al Haddad	United Arab Emirates	3	2	2	4	+5	12
7	Suhail Al Mheiri	United Arab Emirates	3	2	2	4	+5	6
9	Nikolaos Papadopoulos	Greece	3	1	3	4	+7	2
10	Munkhzaya Enkhtur	Mongolia	3	2	1	3	+3	0
10	Dimitrios Malamas	Greece	3	2	1	3	+4	6

IIHF.com

==== Goaltending leaders ====
(minimum 40% team's total ice time)

Pos	Player	Country	MINS	GA	Sv%	GAA	SO
1	Ntalimpor Ploutsis	Greece	180:00	4	95.18	1.33	1
2	Khaled Al Suwaidi	United Arab Emirates	120:00	2	94.87	1.00	1
3	Munkhbold Bayarsaikhan	Mongolia	165:40	8	92.59	2.90	0
4	Kakha Ambrolava	Georgia	178:25	27	78.40	9.08	0

IIHF.com

== Group A Tournament ==
=== Standings ===
Team	Pld	W	OTW	OTL	L	GF	GA	GD	Pts	Promotion
South Africa	5	5	0	0	0	39	8	+31	15	Promoted to Division II B for 2014
North Korea	5	4	0	0	1	20	11	+9	12	
Luxembourg	5	3	0	0	2	20	13	+7	9	
Ireland	5	2	0	0	3	18	20	−2	6	
Greece	5	1	0	0	4	11	27	−16	3	
United Arab Emirates	5	0	0	0	5	10	39	−29	0	

Source: IIHF

=== Schedule ===
All times local.

15 April 2013; 13:00	North Korea	5–3 (3–1, 1–1, 1–1)	United Arab Emirates	Grandwest Ice Arena, Cape Town; Attendance: 120

Game reference

Pak Kun-Hyok
Pak Kuk-Chol
Goalies
Khaled Al-Suwaidi
Referee:
(Romania) Marius Iliescu
Linesmen:
(South Africa) Jonathan Burger
(Belgium) Maarten van den Acker

Kim C-H. (Jon S-C.) – 02:25	1–0
Hong C-R. (Kim C-B.) – 08:25	2–0
Hong C-R (Jon S-C.) – 17:20	3–0
	3–1	17:45 – S. Al-Romaithi
	3–2	21:43 – O. Al-Shamisi
Ri P-I. – 27:51	4–2
Kim H-J. (Hong C-R., Kim C-B.) – 56:32	5–2
	5–3	59:59 – S. Al-Nuaimi (O. Al-Shamisi) (PP)

16 min
Penalties
10 min
33
Shots
12

15 April 2013; 16:15	Greece	3–6 (1–1, 1–1, 1–4)	Ireland	Grandwest Ice Arena, Cape Town; Attendance: 150

Game reference

Dalibor Ploutsis
Goalies
Scott Bickerstaff
Referee:
(Norway) Stian Halm
Linesmen:
(Iceland) Sindri Gunnarsson
(Lithuania) Tomas Lauksedis

	0–1	00:25 – G. Roberts
P. Koulouris (D. Kalyvas) (PP) – 04:41	1–1
	1–2	34:45 – T. O'Driscoll (S. Adams, G. Roberts)
A. Valsamas-Rallis (N. Papadopoulos) – 38:32	2–2
	2–3	40:08 – A. Jackson-Wyatt (S. Adams)
	2–4	45:21 – C. Redmond
	2–5	45:57 – G. Roberts (S. Adams, A. Jackson-Wyatt)
O. Tilios (D. Kalyvas) – 50:17	3–5
	3–6	58:54 – C. Redmond (S. Balmer)

45 min
Penalties
37 min
41
Shots
27

15 April 2013; 20:00	Luxembourg	2–5 (0–0, 2–3, 0–2)	South Africa	Grandwest Ice Arena, Cape Town; Attendance: 596

Game reference

Michel Welter
Goalies
Jack Nebe
Referee:
(Croatia) Vedran Krcelić
Linesmen:
(Netherlands) Ramon Sterkens
(Latvia) Elvijs Trankalis

	0–1	26:18 – X. Botha (C. Nebe)
	0–2	29:10 – J. Reinecke (M. Reinecke, U. Samaai)
	0–3	31:39 – C. Birrell (C. Reeves, J. Valadas) (PP)
B. Welter (B. Houdremont, R. Beran) (PP) – 34:45	1–3
B. Welter – 35:41	2–3
	2–4	45:21 – Z. du Plessis (J. Valadas) (PP)
	2–5	59:27 – M. Giot (J. Valadas)

14 min
Penalties
28 min
27
Shots
56

16 April 2013; 13:00	United Arab Emirates	3–4 (2–1, 0–3, 1–0)	Greece	Grandwest Ice Arena, Cape Town; Attendance: 120

Game reference

Khaled Al-Suwaidi
Goalies
Georgios Fiotakis
Referee:
(Croatia) Vedran Krcelić
Linesmen:
(Netherlands) Ramon Sterkens
(Latvia) Elvijs Trankalis

A. Al-Mazrouei (J. Al-Dhaheri) – 02:44	1–0
J. Al-Dhaheri (SH) – 05:00	2–0
	2–1	05:53 – P. Koulouris (N. Papadopoulos, D. Kalyvas)
	2–2	26:11 – G. Kalyvas (N. Papadopoulos)
	2–3	32:40 – I. Koufis (D. Kalyvas, P. Koulouris)
	2–4	38:37 – P. Koulouris (D. Kalyvas)
M. Al-Shamisi (J. Al-Dhaheri) – 51:28	3–4

10 min
Penalties
10 min
20
Shots
29

16 April 2013; 16:15	North Korea	5–2 (2–0, 3–0, 0–2)	Luxembourg	Grandwest Ice Arena, Cape Town; Attendance: 105

Game reference

Pak Kuk-Chol
Pak Kun-Hyok
Goalies
Philippe Lepage
Referee:
(Romania) Marius Iliescu
Linesmen:
(Lithuania) Tomas Lauksedis
(South Africa) Ryan Marsh

Ri C-M. (Ri S-G.) – 05:07	1–0
Kim K-H. (Ri S-G.) – 06:58	2–0
Ri C-M. – 20:25	3–0
Kim S-G. (Jong S-I.) – 33:04	4–0
Kim H-J. (Hong C-R.) – 35:44	5–0
	5–1	45:40 – B. Welter (R. Beran) (SH)
	5–2	59:27 – B. Houdremont (F. Schons)

14 min
Penalties
26 min
36
Shots
30

16 April 2013; 20:00	South Africa	7–4 (1–0, 3–2, 3–2)	Ireland	Grandwest Ice Arena, Cape Town; Attendance: 749

Game reference

Jack Nebe
Goalies
Scott Bickerstaff
Referee:
(Finland) Mikko Kaukokari
Linesmen:
(Iceland) Sindri Gunnarsson
(Belgium) Maarten van den Acker

D. Magmoed (M. Reinecke) – 17:03	1–0
U. Samaai (M. Reinecke) – 20:28	2–0
	2–1	24:05 – G. Roberts (S. Hamill)
M. Reinecke (U. Samaai, C. Birrell) (PP) – 26:13	3–1
R. Forsyth (M. Giot) – 35:24	4–1
	4–2	39:34 – S. Hamill (S. Sooley, T. O'Driscoll)
U. Samaai (D. Watson) (SH) – 47:00	5–2
Z. du Plessis – 48:12	6–2
L. Stringer (M. Giot) – 54:15	7–2
	7–3	54:46 – C. Redmond
	7–4	57:27 – G. Roberts (C. Redmond)

14 min
Penalties
12 min
62
Shots
27

18 April 2013; 13:00	Luxembourg	5–0 (0–0, 2–0 3–0)	Ireland	Grandwest Ice Arena, Cape Town; Attendance: 109

Game reference

Michel Welter
Goalies
Scott Bickerstaff
Adam Pepper
Referee:
(Croatia) Vedran Krcelić
Linesmen:
(South Africa) Jonathan Burger
(Belgium) Maarten van den Acker

S. Backes (E. Wambach) (PP) – 32:14	1–0
K. Gronlund – 36:06	2–0
T. Beran (S. Backes) – 49:11	3–0
R. Beran (B. Houdremont) – 54:41	4–0
S. Backes (T. Beran, S. Minden) – 55:06	5–0

8 min
Penalties
18 min
24
Shots
15

18 April 2013; 16:15	North Korea	7–1 (1–1, 2–0, 5–0)	Greece	Grandwest Ice Arena, Cape Town; Attendance: 154

Game reference

Pak Kun-Hyok
Pak Kuk-Chol
Goalies
Georgios Fiotakis
Dalibor Ploutsis
Referee:
(Finland) Mikko Kaukokari
Linesmen:
(South Africa) Ryan Marsh
(Latvia) Elvijs Trankalis

Ri C-M. (Kim M-C.) – 08:22	1–0
	1–1	16:14 – K. Adamidis (I. Pachos, A. Valsamas-Rallis)
Ri C-M. (Ri K-S., Ri P-I.) (PP) – 34:16	2–1
Ri S-G. (Kim K-H., Ri K-S.) – 43:18	3–1
Ri C-M. (Ri P-I.) (SH) – 44:13	4–1
Ri P-I. (Ri S-G.) – 47:10	5–1
Kim H-J. (Hong C-R.) – 52:25	6–1
Jong S-I. (Ri C-M.) – 54:24	7–1

14 min
Penalties
10 min
29
Shots
16

18 April 2013; 20:00	South Africa	15–0 (7–0, 4–0, 4–0)	United Arab Emirates	Grandwest Ice Arena, Cape Town; Attendance: 780

Game reference

Jack Nebe
Lucian Lorenzo
Goalies
Ahmed Al-Dhaheri
Khaled Al-Suwaidi
Referee:
(Norway) Stian Halm
Linesmen:
(Iceland) Sindri Gunnarsson
(Lithuania) Tomas Lauksedis

U. Samaai (D. Magmoed, M. Reinecke) – 01:24	1–0
J. Reinecke (M. Reinecke, U. Samaai) – 06:36	2–0
A. Marais (C. Reeves) (PP) – 07:30	3–0
C. Birrell – 08:23	4–0
J. Reinecke (U. Samaai, L. Carelse) – 10:13	5–0
M. Reinecke (J. Reinecke, R. Forsyth) – 13:46	6–0
C. Reeves (L. Stringer, J. Gonslaves) – 16:40	7–0
U. Samaai (J. Reinecke) – 28:54	8–0
J. Valadas (J. Reinecke, C. Reeves) – 29:37	9–0
J. Reinecke (M. Reinecke, D. Magmoed) – 35:36	10–0
J. Reinecke (U. Samaai, L. Carelse) – 39:34	11–0
M. Reinecke (U. Samaai) – 40:11	12–0
J. Valadas (U. Samaai) – 41:51	13–0
C. Reeves (J. Reinecke) – 44:04	14–0
M. Giot (Z. du Plessis) – 49:10	15–0

14 min
Penalties
18 min
77
Shots
11

19 April 2013; 13:00	Ireland	1–2 (0–0, 0–1, 1–1)	North Korea	Grandwest Ice Arena, Cape Town; Attendance: 113

Game reference

Adam Pepper
Goalies
Pak Kuk-Chol
Referee:
(Finland) Mikko Kaukokari
Linesmen:
(South Africa) Jonathan Burger
(Latvia) Elvijs Trankalis

	0–1	39:20 – Ju S-H. (Jong S-I.)
	0–2	50:57 – Kim H-J. (Hong C-R.)
G. Roberts – 51:49	1–2

4 min
Penalties
6 min
17
Shots
26

19 April 2013; 16:15	United Arab Emirates	1–8 (0–4, 0–3, 1–1)	Luxembourg	Grandwest Ice Arena, Cape Town; Attendance: 159

Game reference

Ahmed Al-Dhaheri
Goalies
Philippe Lepage
Referee:
(Norway) Stian Halm
Linesmen:
(South Africa) Ryan Marsh
(Netherlands) Ramon Sterkens

	0–1	00:08 – B. Welter (R. Beran)
	0–2	04:56 – S. Backes (R. Scheier)
	0–3	07:21 – B. Houdremont (R. Beran, K. Gronlund) (PP)
	0–4	12:28 – T. Beran (S. Backes, S. Minden)
	0–5	25:53 – T. Beran (S. Minden, S. Backes)
	0–6	36:59 – S. Backes (S. Minden, T. Beran)
	0–7	39:26 – B. Welter (R. Beran)
J. Al-Dhaheri (O. Al-Muharrami) – 47:57	1–7
	1–8	49:42 – Y. Back (K. Gronlund)

18 min
Penalties
2 min
16
Shots
36

19 April 2013; 20:00	Greece	1–8 (0–2, 0–5, 1–1)	South Africa	Grandwest Ice Arena, Cape Town; Attendance: 1,017

Game reference

Dalibor Ploutsis
Goalies
Jack Nebe
Referee:
(Romania) Marius Iliescu
Linesmen:
(Lithuania) Tomas Lauksedis
(Belgium) Maarten van den Acker

	0–1	03:29 – L. Carelse (A. Marais) (PP)
	0–2	19:50 – U. Samaai (D. Watson, J. Reinecke)
	0–3	23:21 – P. Gonsalves (M. Reinecke, J. Reinecke)
	0–4	27:36 – C. Reeves (PP)
	0–5	29:40 – J. Reinecke (D. Magmoed, M. Reinecke)
	0–6	30:01 – J. Reinecke (M. Reinecke)
	0–7	38:32 – J. Valadas (A. Marais, J. Gonsalves) (PP)
P. Koulouris (D. Kalyvas, R. Fournogerakis) (PP) – 47:49	1–7
	1–8	55:36 – C. Nebe (C. Birrell)

30 min
Penalties
18 min
19
Shots
55

21 April 2013; 13:00	Luxembourg	3–2 (2–0, 0–1, 1–1)	Greece	Grandwest Ice Arena, Cape Town; Attendance: 187

Game reference

Michel Welter
Goalies
Dalibor Ploutsis
Referee:
(Finland) Mikko Kaukokari
Linesmen:
(South Africa) Jonathan Burger
(Iceland) Sindri Gunnarsson

F. Schons (R. Beran) (PP) – 09:51	1–0
F. Schons (T. Beran, S. Backes) – 14:42	2–0
	2–1	23:21 – E. Fournogerakis
B. Schneider (C. Waltener) – 43:18	3–1
	3–2	53:37 – G. Kalyvas (P. Koulouris) (PP)

8 min
Penalties
10 min
20
Shots
26

21 April 2013; 16:15	Ireland	7–3 (3–1, 2–0, 2–2)	United Arab Emirates	Grandwest Ice Arena, Cape Town; Attendance: 217

Game reference

Adam Pepper
Goalies
Khaled Al-Suwaidi
Referee:
(Romania) Marius Iliescu
Linesmen:
(Lithuania) Tomas Lauksedis
(South Africa) Ryan Marsh

S. Dooley (G. Roberts, C. Redmond (PP) – 05:07	1–0
	1–1	07:36 – S. Al-Nuaimi (F. Al-Blooshi)
S. Balmer (S. Adams, G. Roberts) – 09:34	2–1
S. Coleman (C. Redmond, A. Jackson-Wyatt) – 16:06	3–1
G. Roberts (S. Balmer) (SH) – 35:36	4–1
G. Roberts (J. Cummins) – 38:39	5–1
G. Roberts (SH) – 40:50	6–1
S. Dooley (C. Redmond) (SH2) – 42:49	7–1
	7–2	50:10 – A. Al-Mazrouei (O. Al-Shamisi) (PP)
	7–3	59:51 – S. Al-Romaithi (F. Al-Blooshi, K. Al-Mahrouqi)

58 min
Penalties
6 min
33
Shots
29

21 April 2013; 20:00	South Africa	4–1 (1–0, 1–0, 2–1)	North Korea	Grandwest Ice Arena, Cape Town; Attendance: 1,154

Game reference

Jack Nebe
Goalies
Pak Kuk-Chol
Pak Kun-Hyok
Referee:
(Croatia) Vedran Krcelić
Linesmen:
(Netherlands) Ramon Sterkens
(Latvia) Elvijs Trankalis

J. Reinecke (M. Reinecke) (SH) – 02:16	1–0
M. Giot (M. Reinecke) – 20:30	2–0
	2–1	47:21 – Kim H-J. (Ri C-M.)
M. Reinecke (J. Reinecke, U. Samaai) – 52:37	3–1
J. Reinecke (M. Reinecke, U. Samaai) – 53:12	4–1

10 min
Penalties
2 min
21
Shots
34

=== Statistics ===
==== Top 10 scorers ====
Pos	Player	Country	GP	G	A	Pts	+/−	PIM
1	Macky Reinecke	South Africa	5	4	14	18	+19	12
2	Joshua Reinecke	South Africa	5	9	7	16	+20	16
3	Uthman Samaai	South Africa	5	5	10	15	+17	8
4	Gareth Roberts	Ireland	5	8	3	11	+4	16
5	Sacha Backes	Luxembourg	5	4	4	8	+7	0
6	Ri Chol-Min	North Korea	5	5	2	7	+6	4
7	Conor Redmond	Ireland	5	3	4	7	−1	0
8	Robert Beran	Luxembourg	5	1	6	7	0	2
9	Panagiotis Koulouris	Greece	5	4	2	6	−1	14
10	Thierry Beran	Luxembourg	5	3	3	6	+7	4
10	Chris Reeves	South Africa	5	3	3	6	+5	0
10	Jack Valadas	South Africa	5	3	3	6	+5	0

IIHF.com

==== Goaltending leaders ====
(minimum 40% team's total ice time)

Pos	Player	Country	TOI	GA	Sv%	GAA	SO
1	Michel Welter	Luxembourg	180:00	7	92.78	2.33	1
2	Jack Nebe	South Africa	260:00	8	92.59	1.85	0
3	Adam Pepper	Ireland	124:42	5	91.07	2.41	0
4	Pak Kuk-Chol	North Korea	191:02	6	90.48	1.88	0
5	Philippe Lepage	Luxembourg	192:08	6	88.46	3.00	0

IIHF.com

=== Tournament Awards ===
Best players selected by the directorate

- Best Goaltender: Michel Welter (LUX)
- Best Forward: Ri Pong-Il (PRK)
- Best Defenceman: Joshua Reinecke (RSA)
