= 2008 IIHF World Championship Division III =

International ice hockey tournament

Tournament details
- Host countries: Bosnia and Herzegovina; Luxembourg
- Venue(s): 2 (in 2 host cities)
- Dates: 15–17 February 2008; 31 March – 6 April 2008
- Teams: 8

The 2008 IIHF World Championship Division III consisted of two tournaments: the qualification tournament, which was held in Sarajevo, Bosnia and Herzegovina, from 15 to 17 February 2008, and the main tournament, held in Kockelscheuer, Luxembourg, from 31 March to 6 April 2008. Greece won the qualification tournament and qualified for the main tournament. North Korea and South Africa finished in the top two spots of the main tournament and were promoted to next year's Division II.

== Qualification tournament ==
2008 IIHF World Championship Division III Qualification
Tournament details
- Host country: Bosnia and Herzegovina
- City: Sarajevo
- Venue(s): 1 (in 1 host city)
- Dates: 15–17 February 2008
- Teams: 3

Final positions
- Champions: Greece

The 2008 IIHF World Championship Division III qualification tournament was held from 15 to 17 February 2008 at the Olympic Hall Zetra in Sarajevo, Bosnia and Herzegovina. The winners of the tournament, Greece, advanced to the Division III main tournament.

Bosnia and Herzegovina debuted at the IIHF World Championships and Greece made their first appearance since the 1999 tournament.

The directorate of the IIHF World Championship Division III qualification decided that both games of Armenia would be forfeited and count as 5–0 wins for their opponents, Greece and Bosnia and Herzegovina.

Armenia refused to show the passports of their players on four occasions until their first game was in progress. Originally, Armenia lost to Greece 8–5 and won against Bosnia and Herzegovina 18–1. Even without the forfeit, Greece earned the promotion outright to this year’s World Championship Division III with two victories on the ice.

=== Participating teams ===
Team	Qualification
Armenia	Withdrew from 2007 Division III Championship and were relegated.
Greece	First participation since 1999.
Bosnia and Herzegovina	Hosts; first participation in World Championship.

=== Final standings ===
Pos	Team	Pld	W	OTW	OTL	L	GF	GA	GD	Pts	Qualification
1	Greece	2	2	0	0	0	15	1	+14	6	2008 Division III main tournament
2	Bosnia and Herzegovina	2	1	0	0	1	6	10	−4	3	
3	Armenia	2	0	0	0	2	0	10	−10	0	

Source: IIHF

=== Match results ===
All times are local.

15 February 2008; 20:30	Greece	10–1 (1–0, 4–1, 5–0)	Bosnia and Herzegovina	Olympic Hall Zetra, Sarajevo

Game reference

16 February 2008; 20:30	Armenia	0–5 (forfeit)	Greece	Olympic Hall Zetra, Sarajevo

17 February 2008; 17:00	Bosnia and Herzegovina	5–0 (forfeit)	Armenia	Olympic Hall Zetra, Sarajevo

== Main tournament ==
2008 IIHF World Championship Division III (main tournament)
Tournament details
- Host country: Luxembourg
- City: Kockelscheuer
- Venue(s): 1 (in 1 host city)
- Dates: 31 March – 6 April 2008
- Teams: 6

Final positions
- Champions: North Korea
- Runner-up: South Africa
- Third place: Luxembourg

The 2008 IIHF World Championship Division III main tournament was held from 31 March to 6 April 2008 in Kockelscheuer, Luxembourg. The tournament was contested by five nations who already qualified by way of last year's tournament and one nation which was determined after the conclusion of the 2008 Division III qualification tournament.

=== Participating teams ===
Team	Qualification
Turkey	Placed 6th in Group A of 2007 Division II Championship and were relegated.
North Korea	Withdrew from Group B of 2007 Division II Championship and were demoted to Division III.
Luxembourg	Hosts; placed 3rd in 2007 Division III Championship.
South Africa	Placed 4th in 2007 Division III Championship.
Mongolia	Placed 5th in 2007 Division III Championship.
Greece	Placed 1st in 2008 Division III Qualification.

=== Final standings ===
Pos	Team	Pld	W	OTW	OTL	L	GF	GA	GD	Pts	Promotion
1	North Korea	5	5	0	0	0	40	6	+34	15	Promoted to the Division II for 2009
2	South Africa	5	4	0	0	1	29	16	+13	12	Promoted to the Division II for 2009
3	Luxembourg	5	1	2	0	2	22	13	+9	7	
4	Turkey	5	2	0	1	2	27	24	+3	7	
5	Greece	5	1	0	1	3	17	28	−11	4	
6	Mongolia	5	0	0	0	5	11	59	−48	0	

Source: IIHF

=== Match results ===
All times are local.

31 March 2008; 13:00	Greece	1–5 (0–2, 0–0, 1–3)	South Africa	Kockelscheuer Ice Rink

Game reference
Dimitrios Kalyvas 40:19 / Goals / Jared Joyce 02:04, Carel Esterhuizen 19:08, Marc Giot 54:57, Jack Valadas 56:26, David Watson 58:15

31 March 2008; 16:30	North Korea	17–0 (6–0, 5–0, 6–0)	Mongolia	Kockelscheuer Ice Rink

Game reference
Kim Chang Min 08:29, Ri Kum Song 09:49, 23:31, 56:17 Ri Se Gwang 11:44, 38:44, Kim Kyong Il 13:08, 14:28, Ri Chol Min 19:22, Mun Chol 20:59, 31:55, 36:35, Song Chung Song 42:41, 58:05 Ju Sung Hyok 48:18, 53:06, Jong Song Il 55:56 / Goals

31 March 2008; 20:15	Luxembourg	5–4 (OT) (2–1, 0–2, 2–1); OT: 1–0	Turkey	Kockelscheuer Ice Rink

Game reference
Benny Welter 11:15, 45:56 Ronny Scheier 16:39, Georges Scheier 49:18, Thierry Holtzem 63:39 / Goals / Emrah Ozmen 02:43, 28:26, 50:34 Erdogan Coskun 29:09

1 April 2008; 13:00	Mongolia	4–10 (1–2, 1–5, 2–3)	Greece	Kockelscheuer Ice Rink

Game reference
Neguun Ganbat 14:19, Altengeral Ichinnorov 21:48, 54:48, Batzayaagiin Pürevdorj 55:21 / Goals / Dimitrios Kalyvas 08:08, 15:41, 20:46, 28:57, 30:30, 35:16, 37:31, 49:37, Ioannis Koufis 52:46, 59:44

1 April 2008; 16:30	Turkey	1–7 (0–1, 1–1, 0–5)	South Africa	Kockelscheuer Ice Rink

Game reference

1 April 2008; 20:00	North Korea	2–1 (0–0, 0–0, 2–1)	Luxembourg	Kockelscheuer Ice Rink

Game reference
Mun Chol 45:01, Kim Kwang Hyok 57:20 / Goals / Francois Schons 54:59

3 April 2008; 13:00	Turkey	11–3 (5–1, 3–2, 3–0)	Mongolia	Kockelscheuer Ice Rink

Game reference

3 April 2008; 16:30	North Korea	7–3 (2–1, 2–0, 3–2)	Greece	Kockelscheuer Ice Rink

Game reference

3 April 2008; 20:00	Luxembourg	4–5 (1–1, 1–3, 2–1)	South Africa	Kockelscheuer Ice Rink

Game reference

5 April 2008; 13:00	South Africa	0–6 (0–3, 0–2, 0–1)	North Korea	Kockelscheuer Ice Rink

Game reference

5 April 2008; 16:30	Greece	1–9 (0–3, 1–3, 0–3)	Turkey	Kockelscheuer Ice Rink

Game reference

5 April 2008; 20:00	Mongolia	0–9 (0–1, 0–4, 0–4)	Luxembourg	Kockelscheuer Ice Rink

Game reference

6 April 2008; 13:00	South Africa	12–4 (3–2, 5–1, 4–1)	Mongolia	Kockelscheuer Ice Rink

Game reference

6 April 2008; 16:30	Turkey	2–8 (3–2, 5–1, 4–1)	North Korea	Kockelscheuer Ice Rink

Game reference

6 April 2008; 20:00	Luxembourg	3–2 (GWS) (0–0, 1–0, 1–2); OT: 0–0, GWS: 1–0	Greece	Kockelscheuer Ice Rink

Game reference
