= Lithuania men's national ice hockey team =

Men's national ice hockey team representing Lithuania

Lithuania
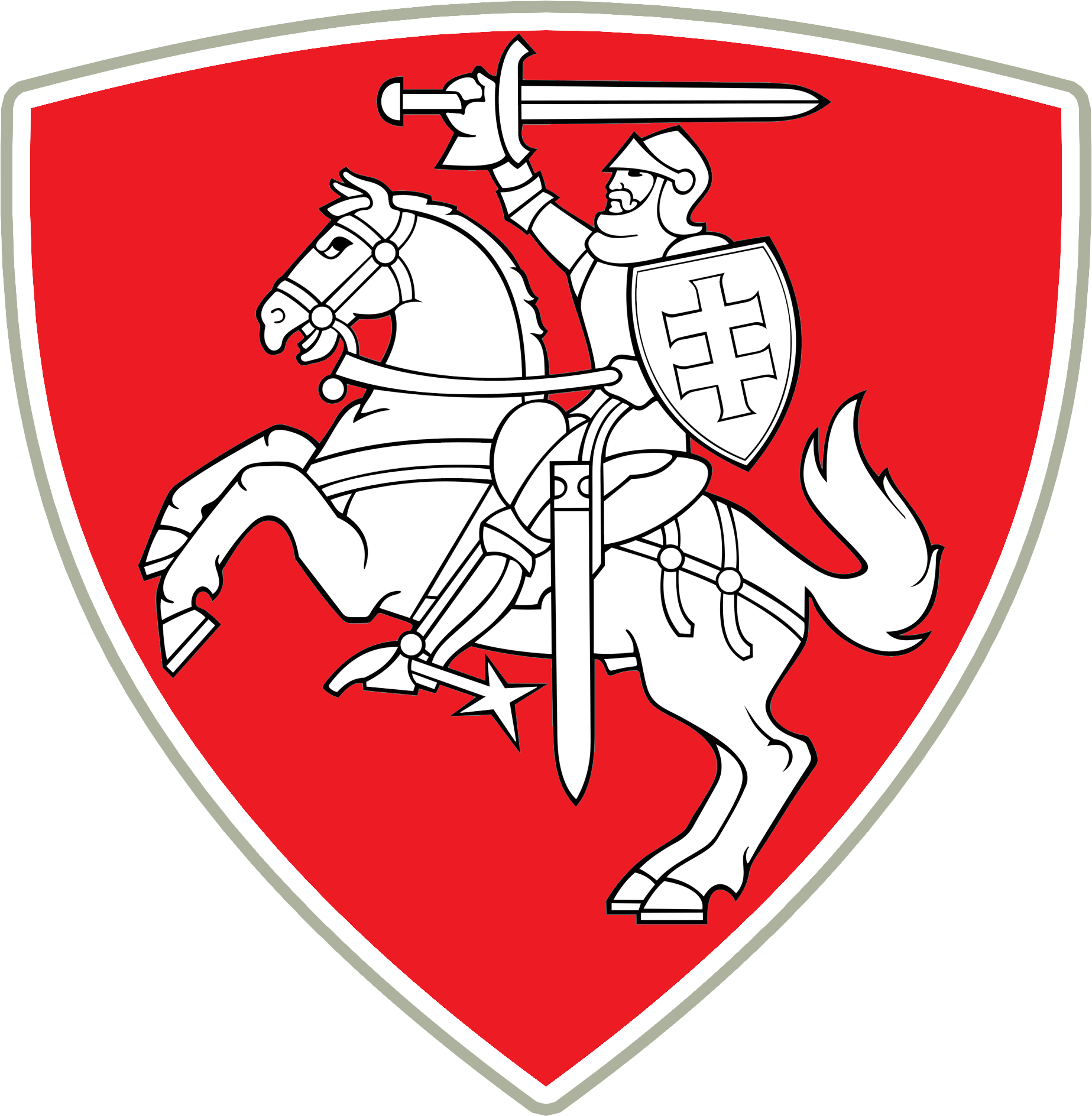
- The Lithuanian away jersey badge features Vytis ("the Chaser") who is also featured on the coat of arms of Lithuania. The home jersey features the Columns of Gediminas.
- Association: Lithuanian Ice Hockey Federation
- General manager: Aurelijus Kriščiūnas
- Head coach: Arūnas Aleinikovas
- Assistants: Dovydas Kulevičius; Simas Baltrūnas
- Captain: Nerijus Ališauskas
- Most games: Aivaras Bendžius; Ugnius Čižas (107)
- Top scorer: Egidijus Bauba (47)
- Most points: Egidijus Bauba (98)
- Team colors: Red, black, white, gold
- IIHF code: LTU

Ranking
- Current IIHF: 23 ▲1 (3 June 2026)
- Highest IIHF: 23 (2008–2010, 2020–2021, 2022)
- Lowest IIHF: 27 (2003–2005)

First international
- Latvia 3–0 Lithuania (Riga, Latvia; 27 February 1932)

Biggest win
- Lithuania 20–0 Luxembourg (Novi Sad, FR Yugoslavia; 25 March 2002); Lithuania 20–0 Iceland (Novi Sad, FR Yugoslavia; 28 March 2002)

Biggest defeat
- Latvia 27–0 Lithuania (Riga, Latvia; 27 August 1996)

IIHF World Championships
- Appearances: 31 (first in 1938)
- Best result: 10th (1938)

International record (W–L–T)
- 101–143–10

The Lithuanian national ice hockey team is the national ice hockey team of Lithuania. The team is overseen by Lithuanian Ice Hockey Federation who is a member of the International Ice Hockey Federation (IIHF). Lithuania is ranked 24th in the IIHF World Rankings. They have never competed in an Olympic Games.

== World Championship record ==
- 1938 – 10th place
- 1954–1991 – part of the Soviet Union national ice hockey team
- 1993 – not ranked (3rd in "Pool C" Qualification Group 1)
- 1994 – not ranked (2nd in "Pool C2" Qualification Group 1)
- 1995 – 31st place (2nd in "Pool C2")
- 1996 – 29th place (1st in "Pool D")
- 1997 – 28th place (8th in "Pool C")
- 1998 – 27th place (3rd in "Pool C")
- 1999 – 27th place (3rd in "Pool C")
- 2000 – 28th place (4th in "Pool C")
- 2001 – 28th place (6th in Division I Group A)
- 2002 – 30th place (1st in Division II Group B)
- 2003 – 28th place (6th in Division I Group A)
- 2004 – 29th place (1st in Division II Group B)
- 2005 – 26th place (5th in Division I Group B)
- 2006 – 19th place (2nd in Division I Group B)
- 2007 – 26th place (5th in Division I Group B)
- 2008 – 24th place (4th in Division I Group B)
- 2009 – 24th place (4th in Division I Group A)
- 2010 – 26th place (5th in Division I Group A)
- 2011 – 25th place (5th in Division I Group B)
- 2012 – 27th place (5th in Division I Group B)
- 2013 – 27th place (5th in Division I Group B)
- 2014 – 25th place (3rd in Division I Group B)
- 2015 – 25th place (3rd in Division I Group B)
- 2016 – 25th place (3rd in Division I Group B)
- 2017 – 25th place (3rd in Division I Group B)
- 2018 – 23rd place (1st in Division I Group B)
- 2019 – 22nd place (6th in Division I Group A)
- 2020 – cancelled due to the COVID-19 pandemic
- 2021 – cancelled due to the COVID-19 pandemic
- 2022 – 19th place (3rd in Division I Group A)
- 2023 – 22nd place (6th in Division I Group A)
- 2024 – 24th place (2nd in Division I Group B)
- 2025 – 23rd place (1st in Division I Group B)
- 2026 – 21st place (5th in Division I Group A)

== Roster ==
Roster for the 2026–27 IIHF European Cup of Nations.

Head coach: Arūnas Aleinikovas

| No. | Pos. | Name | Height | Weight | Date of birth | Team |
|---|---|---|---|---|---|---|
| 1 | D | Nerijus Ališauskas | 1.84 m (6 ft 0 in) | 82 kg (181 lb) | 6 June 1991 (age 35) | HC 21 Prešov |
| 2 | D | Paulius Rumševičius | 1.85 m (6 ft 1 in) | 78 kg (172 lb) | 25 May 2000 (age 26) | Energija Elektrėnai |
| 3 | D | Mantas Stankius | 1.91 m (6 ft 3 in) | 90 kg (200 lb) | 28 August 2000 (age 26) | Hammer Eisbären |
| 4 | D | Simonas Valivonis | 1.84 m (6 ft 0 in) | 75 kg (165 lb) | 7 December 2006 (age 19) | Liepājas HK |
| 5 | D | Tadas Šližys | 1.86 m (6 ft 1 in) | 89 kg (196 lb) | 4 January 2007 (age 19) | Genève Future Hockey U21 |
| 6 | D | Herkus Marcinkevičius | 1.82 m (6 ft 0 in) | 83 kg (183 lb) | 31 August 2001 (age 25) | Hockey Punks Vilnius |
| 7 | D | Matas Čyvas | 1.93 m (6 ft 4 in) | 85 kg (187 lb) | 3 May 2004 (age 22) | Energija Elektrėnai |
| 8 | D | Darius Adakauskas | 1.93 m (6 ft 4 in) | 95 kg (209 lb) | 9 August 2008 (age 18) | Rögle BK U20 |
| 9 | F | Paulius Gintautas | 1.85 m (6 ft 1 in) | 86 kg (190 lb) | 10 May 1995 (age 31) | IK Comet Halden |
| 10 | F | Ugnius Čižas | 1.83 m (6 ft 0 in) | 82 kg (181 lb) | 31 August 1995 (age 31) | EV Füssen |
| 11 | F | Ilja Četvertak | 1.72 m (5 ft 8 in) | 79 kg (174 lb) | 7 July 1997 (age 29) | Hockey Punks Vilnius |
| 12 | F | Emilijus Krakauskas | 1.83 m (6 ft 0 in) | 83 kg (183 lb) | 11 July 1997 (age 29) | EHC Arosa |
| 13 | F | Lukas Žukauskas | 1.85 m (6 ft 1 in) | 83 kg (183 lb) | 12 May 1998 (age 28) | Kyiv Capitals |
| 14 | F | Mark Kaleinikovas | 1.92 m (6 ft 4 in) | 85 kg (187 lb) | 31 December 1998 (age 27) | Rostock Piranhas |
| 15 | F | Egidijus Binkulis | 1.89 m (6 ft 2 in) | 95 kg (209 lb) | 30 May 2000 (age 26) | Energija Elektrėnai |
| 16 | F | Dovydas Laimutis | 1.86 m (6 ft 1 in) | 86 kg (190 lb) | 5 May 2003 (age 23) | Energija Elektrėnai |
| 17 | F | Titas Krakauskas | 1.89 m (6 ft 2 in) | 92 kg (203 lb) | 20 February 2006 (age 20) | EHC Arosa |
| 18 | F | Benas Andrejauskas | 1.83 m (6 ft 0 in) | 79 kg (174 lb) | 23 March 2006 (age 20) | Lausanne HC U21 |
| 19 | F | Danielius Čečekovas | 1.78 m (5 ft 10 in) | 8 kg (18 lb) | 7 June 2006 (age 20) | HC Fribourg-Gottéron U21 |
| 20 | F | Šarūnas Baltrūnas | 1.77 m (5 ft 10 in) | 75 kg (165 lb) | 1 October 2006 (age 20) | Liepājas HK |
| 21 | G | Julius Andrekus | 1.90 m (6 ft 3 in) | 86 kg (190 lb) | 5 October 2005 (age 21) | Malungs IF |
| 22 | G | Dmitrij Švec | 1.83 m (6 ft 0 in) | 74 kg (163 lb) | 23 September 2008 (age 18) | Kristianstads IK |

== All-time record ==
As of 8 May 2026

All-time record against opponents
| Opponent | GP | W | T | L | GF | GA | GD |
|---|---|---|---|---|---|---|---|
| Australia | 3 | 3 | 0 | 0 | 20 | 7 | +13 |
| Austria | 2 | 0 | 0 | 2 | 5 | 11 | –6 |
| Belarus | 3 | 0 | 0 | 3 | 4 | 31 | –27 |
| Belgium | 2 | 2 | 0 | 0 | 19 | 4 | +15 |
| Bulgaria | 3 | 3 | 0 | 0 | 26 | 3 | +23 |
| China | 6 | 3 | 1 | 2 | 18 | 22 | –4 |
| Croatia | 16 | 12 | 1 | 3 | 58 | 33 | +25 |
| Denmark | 1 | 0 | 0 | 1 | 1 | 8 | –7 |
| Estonia | 39 | 18 | 1 | 20 | 150 | 141 | +9 |
| France | 5 | 0 | 0 | 5 | 9 | 26 | –17 |
| Great Britain | 10 | 5 | 0 | 5 | 25 | 35 | –10 |
| Greece | 1 | 1 | 0 | 0 | 20 | 1 | +19 |
| Hungary | 16 | 1 | 0 | 15 | 25 | 97 | –72 |
| Iceland | 1 | 1 | 0 | 0 | 20 | 0 | +20 |
| Israel | 1 | 1 | 0 | 0 | 7 | 2 | +5 |
| Italy | 3 | 0 | 0 | 3 | 5 | 15 | –10 |
| Japan | 11 | 2 | 0 | 9 | 21 | 48 | –27 |
| Kazakhstan | 6 | 0 | 0 | 6 | 7 | 45 | –38 |
| Latvia | 5 | 0 | 0 | 5 | 2 | 45 | –43 |
| Luxembourg | 1 | 1 | 0 | 0 | 20 | 0 | +20 |
| Netherlands | 17 | 5 | 5 | 7 | 47 | 56 | –9 |
| New Zealand | 1 | 1 | 0 | 0 | 21 | 2 | +19 |
| North Korea | 1 | 1 | 0 | 0 | 9 | 0 | +9 |
| Norway | 3 | 1 | 0 | 2 | 8 | 15 | –7 |
| Poland | 23 | 5 | 0 | 18 | 49 | 127 | –78 |
| Romania | 17 | 8 | 1 | 8 | 62 | 57 | +5 |
| Serbia | 6 | 6 | 0 | 0 | 37 | 8 | +29 |
| Serbia and Montenegro | 1 | 1 | 0 | 0 | 14 | 3 | +11 |
| Slovenia | 6 | 0 | 0 | 6 | 10 | 42 | –32 |
| South Africa | 1 | 1 | 0 | 0 | 16 | 1 | +15 |
| South Korea | 9 | 5 | 1 | 3 | 29 | 23 | +6 |
| Spain | 6 | 6 | 0 | 0 | 36 | 6 | +30 |
| Switzerland | 1 | 0 | 0 | 1 | 1 | 15 | –14 |
| Ukraine | 15 | 4 | 0 | 11 | 28 | 65 | –37 |
| Total | 237 | 96 | 10 | 131 | 821 | 982 | –161 |

== Notable players ==
- Mantas Armalis
- Darius Kasparaitis
- Dainius Zubrus
- Nerijus Ališauskas
