= 1999 Men's Ice Hockey World Championships =

1999 edition of the Men's World Ice Hockey Championship

- Dates: March – May 1999

The 1999 Men's Ice Hockey World Championships was the 63rd such event sanctioned by the International Ice Hockey Federation (IIHF). Teams representing 41 countries participated in several levels of competition. The competition also served as qualifications for group placements in the 2000 competition.

== World Championship Group A ==
The Championship took place between sixteen teams in Norway.

- Austria (2nd, Group 1 Qualifier)
- Belarus
- Canada
- Czech Republic
- France (2nd, Group 2 Qualifier)
- Finland
- Italy
- Japan (Far East Qualifier)
- Latvia
- Norway (Host)
- Russia
- Slovakia
- Sweden
- Switzerland
- Ukraine (1st, Group 2 Qualifier)
- United States (1st, Group 1 Qualifier)

== World Championship Group B ==
Played at Odense and Rodovre, Denmark 8–17 April. The top three teams at the end of the tournament advanced to the qualifying round for the 2000 IIHF World Championship. The Germans, after failing to qualify for Group A, lost their final game to Kazakhstan and finished fourth. The twentieth place overall was by far the worst finish in their history.

=== Final Round 17–24 Place ===
Pos	Team	Pld	W	D	L	GF	GA	GD	Pts
17	Denmark	7	6	1	0	30	12	+18	13
18	Great Britain	7	5	1	1	24	16	+8	11
19	Kazakhstan	7	5	0	2	25	11	+14	10
20	Germany	7	5	0	2	19	17	+2	10
21	Slovenia	7	2	1	4	14	17	−3	5
22	Estonia	7	2	1	4	17	25	−8	5
23	Poland	7	1	0	6	15	23	−8	2
24	Hungary	7	0	0	7	10	33	−23	0

Denmark, Great Britain, and Kazakhstan all advanced to the qualifiers for the 2000 IIHF World Championship. Hungary was relegated to Group C.

8 April	Slovenia	1–2	Great Britain

8 April	Kazakhstan	5–2	Poland

8 April	Hungary	2–5	Germany

8 April	Denmark	4–2	Estonia

9 April	Estonia	3–2	Hungary

9 April	Germany	3–1	Poland

9 April	Denmark	4–1	Slovenia

9 April	Great Britain	1–0	Kazakhstan

10 April	Germany	3–2	Great Britain

10 April	Denmark	3–1	Kazakhstan

11 April	Estonia	3–1	Poland

11 April	Slovenia	5–1	Hungary

12 April	Kazakhstan	5–1	Hungary

12 April	Poland	1–4	Slovenia

13 April	Denmark	6–1	Germany

13 April	Great Britain	6–2	Estonia

14 April	Great Britain	4–3	Poland

14 April	Germany	4–1	Estonia

15 April	Kazakhstan	4–0	Slovenia

15 April	Denmark	5–1	Hungary

16 April	Kazakhstan	5–3	Estonia

16 April	Hungary	2–4	Great Britain

16 April	Denmark	3–1	Poland

16 April	Germany	2–0	Slovenia

17 April	Slovenia	3–3	Estonia

17 April	Poland	6–1	Hungary

17 April	Kazakhstan	5–1	Germany

17 April	Denmark	5–5	Great Britain

== World Championship Group C ==
Played at Eindhoven and Tilburg, Netherlands 5–11 April. While eight teams had qualified for the Group C tournament, the host Dutch government had suspended diplomatic relations with Yugoslavia, due to the Kosovo War, and did not allow the Yugoslavian team to participate in the tournament.

=== Group 1 ===
Team	Pld	W	D	L	GF	GA	GD	Pts
Netherlands	3	3	0	0	28	1	+27	6
China	3	2	0	1	10	12	−2	4
Croatia	3	1	0	2	15	13	+2	2
Bulgaria	3	0	0	3	2	29	−27	0

5 April	Netherlands	13–0	Bulgaria

5 April	China	5–3	Croatia

6 April	China	5–1	Bulgaria

6 April	Netherlands	7–1	Croatia

8 April	Croatia	11–1	Bulgaria

8 April	Netherlands	8–0	China

=== Group 2 ===
Team	Pld	W	D	L	GF	GA	GD	Pts
Romania	2	2	0	0	13	5	+8	4
Lithuania	2	0	1	1	6	9	−3	1
South Korea	2	0	1	1	7	12	−5	1

5 April	Romania	8–3	South Korea

6 April	Lithuania	4–4	South Korea

8 April	Romania	5–2	Lithuania

=== Final Round 25–28 Place ===
Pos	Team	Pld	W	D	L	GF	GA	GD	Pts
25	Netherlands	3	3	0	0	23	2	+21	6
26	Romania	3	2	0	1	16	13	+3	4
27	Lithuania	3	0	1	2	7	15	−8	1
28	China	3	0	1	2	6	22	−16	1

The Netherlands was promoted to Group B.

10 April	Netherlands	6–1	Lithuania

10 April	Romania	10–2	China

11 April	Netherlands	9–1	Romania

11 April	Lithuania	4–4	China

=== Final Round 29–32 Place ===
- Because Yugoslavia was unable to participate for political reasons, the IIHF officially maintained their 30th place from the previous World Championship.

Pos	Team	Pld	W	D	L	GF	GA	GD	Pts
29	Croatia	2	1	1	0	16	6	+10	3
31	South Korea	2	1	1	0	11	10	+1	3
32	Bulgaria	2	0	0	2	6	17	−11	0

No team was relegated, with Yugoslavia resuming their place in 2000 the tournament was played with nine teams.

10 April	Croatia	5–5	South Korea

11 April	Bulgaria	5–6	South Korea

== World Championship Group D ==
Played at Krugersdorp, South Africa 14–20 April

=== Group 1 ===
Team	Pld	W	D	L	GF	GA	GD	Pts
Spain	2	2	0	0	30	1	+29	4
New Zealand	2	1	0	1	4	25	−21	2
Greece	2	0	0	2	1	9	−8	0

14 April	Greece	0–6	Spain

15 April	New Zealand	3–1	Greece

16 April	Spain	24–1	New Zealand

=== Group 2 ===
Team	Pld	W	D	L	GF	GA	GD	Pts
Australia	2	2	0	0	26	2	+24	4
South Africa	2	1	0	1	19	7	+12	2
Turkey	2	0	0	2	2	38	−36	0

14 April	Australia	20–1	Turkey

15 April	Turkey	1–18	South Africa

16 April	South Africa	1–6	Australia

=== Group 3 ===
Team	Pld	W	D	L	GF	GA	GD	Pts
Israel	2	2	0	0	17	2	+15	4
Belgium	2	1	0	1	16	6	+10	2
Iceland	2	0	0	2	0	25	−25	0

14 April	Iceland	0–11	Israel

15 April	Belgium	14–0	Iceland

16 April	Israel	6–2	Belgium

=== Final Round 33–35 Place ===
Pos	Team	Pld	W	D	L	GF	GA	GD	Pts
33	Spain	2	1	1	0	8	6	+2	3
34	Israel	2	1	1	0	5	3	+2	3
35	Australia	2	0	0	2	3	7	−4	0

Spain was promoted to Group C.

18 April	Australia	0–2	Israel

19 April	Israel	3–3	Spain

20 April	Spain	5–3	Australia

=== Consolation round 36–38 Place ===
Pos	Team	Pld	W	D	L	GF	GA	GD	Pts
36	Belgium	2	2	0	0	16	3	+13	4
37	South Africa	2	1	0	1	5	7	−2	2
38	New Zealand	2	0	0	2	3	14	−11	0

18 April	South Africa	1–6	Belgium

19 April	Belgium	10–2	New Zealand

20 April	New Zealand	1–4	South Africa

=== Consolation round 39–41 Place ===
Pos	Team	Pld	W	D	L	GF	GA	GD	Pts
39	Turkey	2	1	0	1	5	4	+1	2
40	Greece	2	1	0	1	9	9	0	2
41	Iceland	2	1	0	1	9	10	−1	2

18 April	Turkey	2–3	Iceland

19 April	Iceland	6–8	Greece

20 April	Greece	1–3	Turkey

== See also ==
- World Juniors
- Women's Championships
