= Turkey men's national ice hockey team =

Turkey's national ice hockey team

Turkey
- Association: Turkish Ice Hockey Federation
- General manager: Eray Atalı
- Head coach: Daniel Reja
- Assistants: Burak Aktürk; Yavuz Karakoç
- Captain: Ferhat Bakal
- Most games: Emrah Özmen (76)
- Top scorer: Emrah Özmen (49)
- Most points: Emrah Özmen (91)
- Team colors
- IIHF code: TUR

Ranking
- Current IIHF: NR (3 June 2026)
- Highest IIHF: 35 (2010)
- Lowest IIHF: 43 (2003–04, 2018)

First international
- Greece 15–3 Turkey (Johannesburg, South Africa; 21 March 1992)

Biggest win
- Turkey 16–0 Greece (Cape Town, South Africa; 14 April 2011)

Biggest defeat
- Spain 38–0 Turkey (Johannesburg, South Africa; 27 March 1992)

IIHF World Championships
- Appearances: 18 (first in 1992)
- Best result: 32nd (1992)

International record (W–L–T)
- 57–93–1

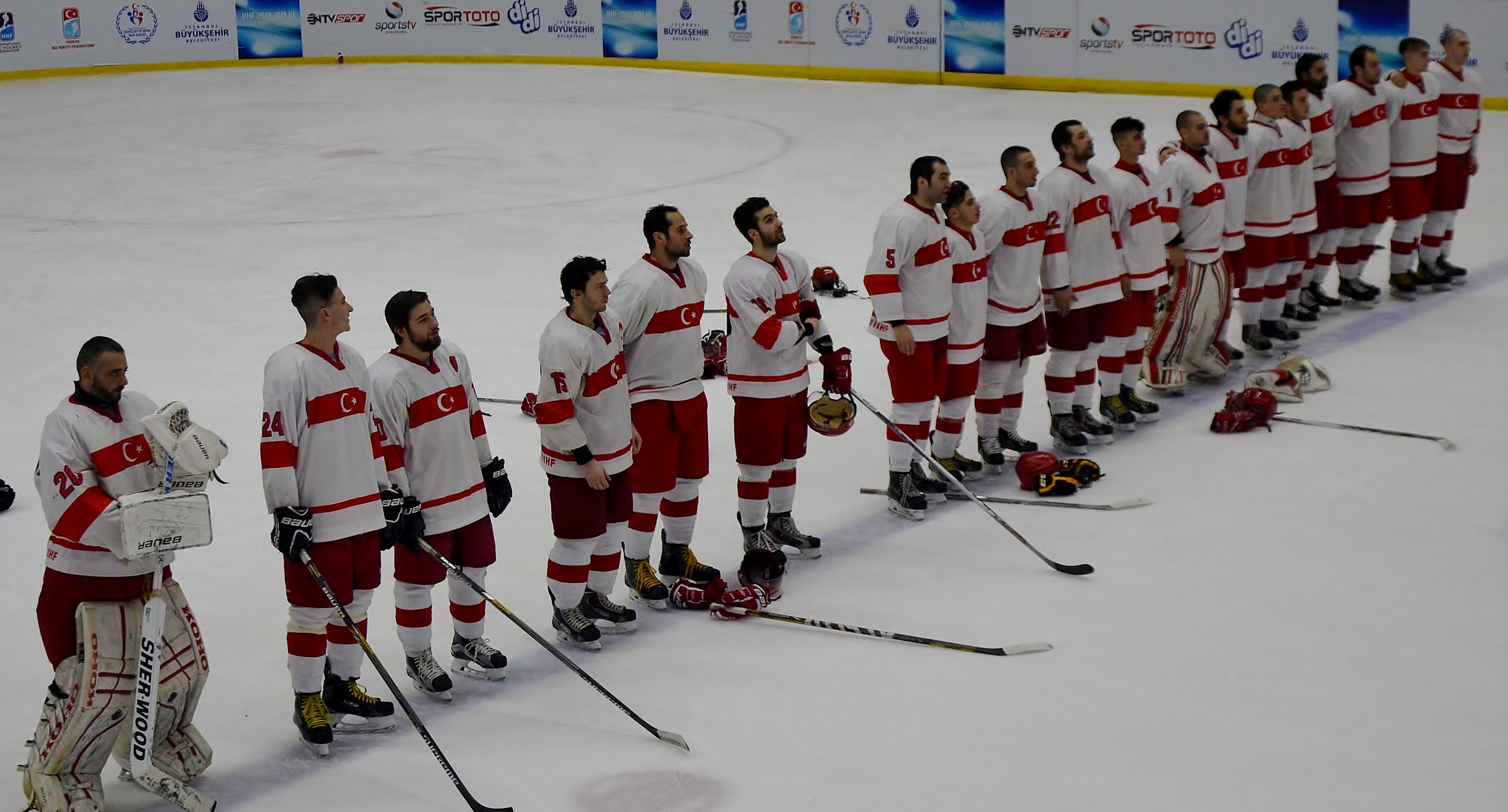
Turkey national ice hockey team at the 2016 IIHF World Championship Division III match against Hong Kong.

The Turkish men's national ice hockey team is the national ice hockey team of Turkey, and is controlled by the Turkish Ice Hockey Federation (Turkish: Türkiye Buz Hokeyi Federasyonu, TBHF), a member of the International Ice Hockey Federation. It is currently ranked 39th in the IIHF World Ranking. Turkey is also included in the specialized ranking for Asian countries and is currently in 11th place.

== History ==
In 2014, the Turkish Ice Hockey Federation caused a scandal as a foreigner wearing Turkish national jersey played in a friendly international match. Denis Legersky from Slovakia, who plays since three and a half years in Turkey and is currently a member of İzmir BB GSK, was registered in the match against Bosnia and Herzegovina national ice hockey team as a coach–player. He, appeared in the jersey of Ogün Uzunali though not a Turkish citizen, and scored two goals in the match played in Sarajevo before 8,000 spectators that ended 7–2 for the Turkey national team. The officials of the Ministry of Youth and Sports protested the incident.

== Olympics ==
The Turkey men's hockey team has never qualified for an Olympic tournament.

== World Championship record ==
Year	Host city	Country	Result
1992	Johannesburg	South Africa	6th in Group C2 (32nd)
1993	Ankara	Turkey	3rd in Group C qualifying pool 4 (NR)
1994	Zagreb	Croatia	2nd in Group C2 qualifying pool 2 (NR)
1996	Metulla	Israel	2nd in Group D qualifying pool 2 (NR)
1997	Ankara	Turkey	3rd in Group E (NR)
1998	Krugersdorp	South Africa	7th in Group D (39th)
1999	Krugersdorp	South Africa	7th in Group D (39th)
2000	Reykjavík	Iceland	9th in Group D (42nd)
2002	Cape Town	South Africa	6th in Division II Group A (39th)
2003	Auckland	New Zealand	3rd in Division III (43rd)
2004	Reykjavík	Iceland	2nd in Division III (42nd)
2005	Zagreb	Croatia	6th in Division II Group A (40th)
2006	Reykjavík	Iceland	2nd in Division III (42nd)
2007	Zagreb	Croatia	6th in Division II Group A (39th)
2008	Luxembourg	Luxembourg	4th in Division III (44th)
2009	Dunedin	New Zealand	2nd in Division III (42nd)
2010	Naucalpan	Mexico	6th in Division II Group A (40th)
2011	Cape Town	South Africa	3rd in Division III (43rd)
2012	Erzurum	Turkey	1st in Division III (41st)
2013	İzmit	Turkey	5th in Division II Group B (39th)
2014	Jaca	Spain	6th in Division II Group B (40th)
2015	İzmir	Turkey	2nd in Division III (42nd)
2016	Istanbul	Turkey	1st in Division III (41st)
2017	Auckland	New Zealand	6th in Division II Group B (40th)
2018	Cape Town	South Africa	3rd in Division III (43rd)
2019	Sofia	Bulgaria	2nd in Division III (42nd)
2020	Kockelscheuer	Luxembourg	Cancelled due to the COVID-19 pandemic
2021	Kockelscheuer	Luxembourg	Cancelled due to the COVID-19 pandemic
2022	Kockelscheuer	Luxembourg	2nd in Division IIIA (38th)
2023	Istanbul	Turkey	5th in Division IIB (39th)
2024	Sofia	Bulgaria	6th in Division IIB (40th)
2025	Istanbul	Turkey	3rd in Division IIIA (43rd)
2026	Cape Town	South Africa	1st in Division IIIA (41st)
Green marks a year followed by promotion, red a year followed by relegation.

== All-time record against other nations ==
As of 19 April 2026

Team	WR (2026)	GP	W	T	L	WLDiff	GF	GA	GDiff
Armenia	58	2	2	0	0	+2	19	4	+15
Australia	39	5	0	0	5	−5	3	75	−72
Belgium	40	5	0	0	5	−5	7	52	−45
Bosnia and Herzegovina	46	7	6	0	1	+5	44	14	+30
Bulgaria	33	11	2	0	9	−7	26	81	−55
China	26	3	1	0	2	-1	10	14	-4
Chinese Taipei	34	5	4	0	1	+3	23	15	+8
Croatia	29	6	0	0	6	−6	7	114	−107
Estonia	25	1	0	0	1	−1	0	24	−24
Georgia	32	5	2	0	3	-1	23	18	+5
Greece		9	6	0	3	+3	55	36	+19
Hong Kong	48	3	3	0	0	+3	21	3	+18
Iceland	31	4	0	0	4	−4	7	29	−22
Ireland		4	3	1	0	+2	21	10	+11
Israel	41	8	0	0	8	−8	11	78	−67
Kyrgyzstan	43	1	0	0	1	−1	1	3	−2
Luxembourg	47	13	8	0	5	+3	79	52	+27
Mexico	45	9	4	0	5	−1	26	39	−13
Mongolia	50	4	4	0	0	+4	31	3	+28
New Zealand	42	11	1	0	10	−9	30	65	−35
North Korea	49	4	1	0	3	−2	12	25	−13
Serbia	30	3	0	0	3	−3	7	19	−12
South Africa	37	14	5	0	9	−4	47	111	−64
South Korea	24	1	0	0	1	−1	0	14	−14
Spain	27	5	0	0	5	−5	4	79	−75
Thailand	36	1	1	0	0	+1	6	1	+5
Turkmenistan	44	4	3	0	1	+2	18	15	+1
United Arab Emirates	38	3	1	0	2	+1	19	21	-2
Total	35	151	57	1	93	-36	558	1014	-456

== Current squad ==
=== Technical staff ===
As of 19 April 2026

- Head coach: (Canada) Dan Reja
- Asst. coach: Burak Savas Aktürk, Yavuz Karakoc

=== Players ===
- 4 Ogün Uzunali
- 5 Arhan Kuzey Girgin
- 6 Hamza Yavuz
- 7 Furkan Sentürk
- 9 Emrah Savas
- 10 Yusuf Kars
- 11 Emre Faner
- 12 Haktan Kabay
- 13 Fatih Taygar
- 14 Oguz Karakoc
- 15 Amir Zihni Tinaz
- 16 Emin Inandi
- 17 Mehmet Ayberk Karadag
- 18 Sait Bingöl
- 19 Bertan Demirdelen
- 20 Saveli Voronov
- 21 Fatih Faner
- 22 Osman Cholak
- 24 Ferhat Bakal
- 25 Ogulcan Heja Kizilkaya
