= Israel men's national ice hockey team =

Israel's national ice hockey team

Israel
- Association: Ice Hockey Federation of Israel
- General manager: Joshua Greenberg
- Head coach: Jevgeni Gusin
- Assistants: Michael Gennello
- Captain: Kirill Polozov
- Most games: Sergei Frenkel (85)
- Top scorer: Daniel Mazour (54)
- Most points: Sergei Frenkel (117)
- Team colors
- IIHF code: ISR
Home colours	Away colours	Third colours

Ranking
- Current IIHF: 41 (▼1) (3 June 2026)
- Highest IIHF: 31 (2025)
- Lowest IIHF: 40 (2011–12)

First international
- Spain 23–4 Israel (Johannesburg, South Africa; 22 March 1992)

Biggest win
- Israel 26–2 Greece (Cape Town, South Africa; 15 April 2011)

Biggest defeat
- Latvia 32–0 Israel (Ljubljana, Slovenia; 15 March 1993)

IIHF World Championships
- Appearances: 31 (first in 1992)
- Best result: 28th (2006)

International record (W–L–T)
- 75–91–9

The Israel national ice hockey team (Hebrew: נבחרת ישראל בהוקי קרח) is the national men's ice hockey team of Israel. Israel was ranked 31st as of May 2025 by the International Ice Hockey Federation and 8th as of August 2025 by the specialized website AsianIceHockey.com. In 2019, the team won the gold medal in the 2019 IIHF World Championship Division II Group B tournament in Mexico City.

Its greatest achievement in its history was winning its division II group in 2005 and being promoted to division I for the first, and thus far only, time. Israel was relegated back to division II a year later.

== World Championships record ==
Eliezer Sherbatov drew international attention when he first played in the 2005 IIHF World U18 Championship Division III, in Bulgaria, at the age of 13, becoming the youngest player to step on the ice in an under-18 ice hockey world championship. He scored 9 points (4 goals + 5 assists) in 5 games, as the team won a bronze medal, Israel's first in hockey in a championship tournament.

The team was promoted to the IIHF World Championship Division I in 2005 Men's World Ice Hockey Championships. The following year the team was relegated again to Division II. In 2010, Israel was relegated to Division III.

However, in 2011 the team finished first in Division III Group B, earning a promotion back to Division II. Israel won all five of its games by a combined score of 57–9, and was promoted to the IIHF Division II WHC to be played in 2012. Sherbatov led the tournament in points, goals, assists, and +/-, earning 26 points (14 goals + 12 assists) in just four games. He was named the best forward of the tournament.

At the 2012 IIHF World Championship Division II tournament in Bulgaria, the Israeli team was able to stay in the second division. Beginning in 2015 and still as of 2020, Sherbatov was captain of the national team.

In 2019, the team won the gold medal in the 2019 IIHF World Championship Division II Group B tournament in Mexico City, Israel's first gold medal in hockey. With the win, the team qualified for the World Championships Division 2A. Sherbatov was named Best Forward, and had the best +/- rating, was the top goal scorer, and was the top scorer with 15 points (7 goals + 8 assists) in 5 games.

Year	Place	Division	Group	Placement	GP	W	T	L	GF	GA
1992	30th	Group C2		4th	5	1	1	3	22	42
1993	31st	Group C1		6th	7	2	0	5	30	97
1994	34th	Group C2	1	7th	5	1	0	4	19	36
1995	35th	Group C2	2	6th	6	3	0	3	39	23
1996	35th	Group D	2	7th	7	3	1	3	34	35
1997	33rd	Group D	2	5th	5	2	0	3	22	28
1998	35th	Group D	1	3rd	5	3	0	2	39	19
1999	33rd	Group D	3	2nd	4	3	0	1	21	5
2000	34th	Group D	1	1st	4	3	0	1	31	7
2001	32nd	Division II	B	2nd	5	4	0	1	21	11
2002	34th	Division II	A	3rd	5	3	0	2	14	22
2003	37th	Division II	B	5th	5	1	2	2	11	19
2004	38th	Division II	A	5th	5	0	1	4	3	28
2005	30th	Division II	B	1st	5	4	1	0	21	11
2006	28th	Division I	A	6th	5	0	0	5	3	47
2007	34th	Division II	B	3rd	4	2	0	2	6	24
2008	36th	Division II	A	4th	5	2	0	3	16	28
2009	38th	Division II	A	5th	5	1	0	4	9	38
2010	39th	Division II	B	6th	5	0	0	5	11	55
2011	41st	Division III		1st	5	5	0	0	57	9
2012	39th	Division II-B		5th	5	2	0	3	19	22
2013	35th	Division II-B		1st	5	4	0	1	30	14
2014	34th	Division II-A		6th	5	1	0	4	19	37
2015	39th	Division II-B		5th	5	1	0	4	11	20
2016	37th	Division II-B		3rd	5	2	0	3	22	33
2017	37th	Division II-B		3rd	5	3	0	2	24	14
2018	37th	Division II-B		3rd	5	3	0	2	24	14
2019	35th	Division II-B		1st	5	0	0	32	16	
2020		Division II-A	Cancelled due to the COVID-19 pandemic							
2021		Division II-A	Cancelled due to the COVID-19 pandemic							
2022	31st	Division II-A		5th	4	0	0	4	4	32
2023	33rd	Division II-A		5th	5	1	0	4	14	37
2024	32nd	Division II-A		4th	5	1	0	4	17	26
2025	34th	Division II-A		6th	5	1	0	4	9	16
2026	35th	Division II-B		1st	5	5	0	0	26	14
Total	–	–	–	–	166	72	6	88	680	879

== Olympics ==
Israel has tried to qualify for the Olympics four times. In their first attempt in 1996 for the 1998 Winter Olympics they played Greece in a preliminary match in Metula, which they lost 10-2. However, Greece used ineligible players, so Israel played another preliminary match against Yugoslavia, in Kaunas. Israel lost the game 5-3, but ended up being disqualified anyways due to use of ineligible players from Russia. The scores for both forfeited matches are recorded as 5-0.

Israel's second attempt was in 2012 for the 2014 Winter Olympics, where they were the lowest-ranked country attempting to qualify at 40th place. Israel was placed in a preliminary qualifying group with Croatia, Serbia and Mexico for a round-robin qualifier in Zagreb, in which they lost every game.

In 2015 Israel attempted to qualify for the 2018 Winter Olympics, and were placed in the first preliminary round. In their group matches held in Tallinn, they were unable to qualify for the second preliminary round, beating Bulgaria but losing to Estonia and Mexico.

Israel's most recent attempt was in 2019 for the 2022 Winter Olympics. For the first time, they were ranked high enough to skip the first round of qualification, and were placed in the second pre-qualification round held in Brașov. In their group they lost to Romania and Iceland, but were able to beat Kyrgyzstan in overtime.

Year	Seeding	Round	Group	Place	GP	W	OTW	OTL	L	GF	GA
1994	Did not enter										
1998	----	Preliminary Matches		DQ	2	1	0	0	1	5	5
2002	Did not enter										
2006	Did not enter										
2010	Did not enter										
2014	40th	Preliminary Qualifier	Group K	4th	3	0	0	0	3	5	29
2018	32nd	Qualification Round 1	Group K	3rd	3	1	0	0	2	6	26
2022	33rd	Qualification Round 2	Group K	3rd	3	0	1	0	2	5	24
2026	Did not enter										

== Team ==
=== Roster ===
Roster for the 2026 IIHF World Championship.

Goaltenders
#	Player	Catches	Height	Weight	Date of birth	Club
20	Maxim Kalyayev	L	179 cm	93 kg	15 April 1998 (age 28)	(Israel) Rishon Devils
1	Nir Tichon	L	183 cm	75 kg	8 September 1998 (age 27)	(Czech Republic) HC Rytíři Vlašim
Defencemen
#	Player	Shoots	Height	Weight	Date of birth	Club
18	Aner Abend	L	172 cm	70 kg	3 December 2004 (age 21)	(Israel) Rishon Devils
11	Artur Charniak	L	173 cm	66 kg	2 February 2009 (age 17)	(United States) Gilmour Academy U16
12	Timur Galeyev	L	175 cm	70 kg	20 June 1996 (age 30)	(Israel) Ra'anana Sharks
14	Shon Kazinetz	L	175 cm	72 kg	14 May 2007 (age 19)	(Slovenia) Hiti Academy Bled Hawks U20
3	Denis Kozev	L	182 cm	86 kg	8 September 1998 (age 27)	(Israel) North Stars Metulla
5	Nick Ogurtsyn	L	185 cm	76 kg	11 August 2007 (age 18)	(Sweden) Älvdalens HK
4	Yuval Turner	L	178 cm	74 kg	29 March 2004 (age 22)	(Sweden) Osby IK
Forwards
#	Player	Shoots	Height	Weight	Date of birth	Club
21	Samson Goldstein	L	182 cm	80 kg	30 April 2009 (age 17)	(Canada) Toronto Jr. Canadiens U18
24	Yuval Halpert	L	171 cm	74 kg	20 September 2000 (age 25)	(Israel) Ashdod Chiefs
19	Itay Kerner	L	185 cm	80 kg	17 March 2006 (age 20)	(Slovenia) Hiti Academy Bled Hawks U20
22	Maxim Khubashvili	L	182 cm	76 kg	18 November 1997 (age 28)	(Israel) Ra'anana Sharks
8	Gleb Khvoles	L	175 cm	73 kg	4 November 1995 (age 30)	(Israel) Ra'anana Sharks
16	Mike Levin	L	173 cm	71 kg	16 October 2005 (age 20)	(Romania) CSM Corona Brașov
7	Gennadi Malashchenko	L	183 cm	79 kg	7 January 1998 (age 28)	(Israel) Ashdod Chiefs
9	Kirill Malashchenko	L	193 cm	87 kg	28 February 2003 (age 23)	(Israel) Ashdod Chiefs
15	Kirill Polozov	L	190 cm	95 kg	15 January 1991 (age 35)	(Israel) Ashdod Chiefs
23	Ori Segal	L	173 cm	77 kg	8 May 2004 (age 22)	(United States) Curry College
17	Ilya Spektor	L	173 cm	88 kg	10 April 1996 (age 30)	(Israel) Kfar Saba Kings
10	Sean Voshilo	L	177 cm	80 kg	7 January 2004 (age 22)	(Israel) Ashdod Chiefs
6	Nikita Zitserman	L	183 cm	85 kg	12 September 2008 (age 17)	(Slovenia) Hiti Academy Bled Hawks U20

=== Notable players ===
- Maxim Birbraer (only Israeli to be drafted by NHL team)
- Alon Eizenman (ACHA Hall of Fame member)
- Oren Eizenman (played 4 seasons in AHL)
- David Levin (won OHL's Jack Ferguson Award)
- Nikita Lukin (won KHL's Gagarin Cup in 2013)
- Eliezer Sherbatov (first Israeli to play in KHL)

=== Coaches ===
List of coaches for each tournament

Period	Name
1992–1993	(Israel) Gideon Lee
1994	(Canada) Marshall Uretsky
1995	(Israel) (Russia) Semyon Yakubovich
1996–1997	(Russia) Nikolai Epshtein
1998	(Israel) (Russia) Lev Sudat
1999–2000	(Israel) Sergei Matin
2001–2004	(Israel) Boris Mindel
2005–2009	(Canada) Jean Perron
2010	(Israel) Boris Mindel
2011	(Israel) Sergei Belo
2012–2014	(Canada) Jean Perron
2015–2017	(United States) Derek Eisler
2018	(Israel) (Russia) Semyon Yakubovich
2019–2021	(Czech Republic) (United States) Bobby Holík
2022–2023	(United States) Ty Newberry
2024–2025	(Israel) (Russia) Evgeni Kozhevnikov
2026–present	(Israel) (Kazakhstan) Yevgeni Gusin

== All-time record against other nations ==
As of 12 April 2026

Team	GP	W	T	L	GF	GA
Australia	15	6	0	9	53	73
Belgium	16	6	1	9	46	62
Bulgaria	12	7	2	3	54	38
China	9	1	0	8	25	58
Chinese Taipei	1	1	0	0	6	1
Croatia	7	0	0	7	7	53
Estonia	5	0	0	5	9	79
France	1	0	0	1	0	9
Georgia	2	1	0	1	10	9
Germany	1	0	0	1	2	11
Great Britain	1	0	0	1	0	12
Greece	5	4	1	0	59	13
Hungary	1	0	0	1	0	8
Iceland	13	9	0	4	60	36
Ireland	1	1	0	0	7	1
Japan	1	0	0	1	1	7
Kyrgyzstan	2	2	0	0	9	7
Latvia	1	0	0	1	0	32
Lithuania	1	0	0	1	2	7
Luxembourg	4	2	2	0	26	9
Mexico	11	6	0	5	42	46
Mongolia	1	1	0	0	5	0
Netherlands	2	0	0	2	2	13
New Zealand	9	4	0	5	43	37
North Korea	8	5	2	1	45	31
Romania	4	0	0	4	2	55
Serbia	9	2	0	7	21	46
South Africa	8	7	0	1	46	21
South Korea	4	0	1	3	11	23
Spain	9	1	1	7	17	76
Turkey	8	8	0	0	78	11
United Arab Emirates	2	1	0	1	9	12
Ukraine	1	0	0	1	0	29
Total	170	70	9	91	671	911
