= 2004 IIHF World Championship Division III =

International ice hockey tournament

Tournament details
- Host country: Iceland
- Venue(s): Reykjavík
- Dates: 16–21 March
- Teams: 5

Final positions
- Champions: Iceland

Tournament statistics
- Games played: 10
- Scoring leader(s): (Iceland) Jonas Magnusson (12 pts)

The 2004 IIHF World Championship Division III was an international ice hockey tournament run by the International Ice Hockey Federation. The tournament was contested on 16–21 March 2004 in Reykjavík, Iceland. Iceland won the championship and gained promotion, along with Turkey, into the 2005 Division II tournament.

== Participants ==
Team	2003 result
Mexico	Placed 6th in Division II Group A and were relegated.
Iceland	Host, Placed 6th in Division II Group B and were relegated.
Turkey	Placed 3rd in Division III.
Armenia	Participating in their first IIHF tournament.
Ireland	Participating in their first IIHF tournament.

== Standings ==
Pos	Team	Pld	W	D	L	GF	GA	GD	Pts	Promotion
1	Iceland	4	3	1	0	46	8	+38	7	Promoted to Division II for 2005
2	Turkey	4	3	0	1	26	14	+12	6	Promoted to Division II for 2005
3	Mexico	4	2	1	1	29	8	+21	5	
4	Ireland	4	1	0	3	23	23	0	2	
5	Armenia	4	0	0	4	2	73	−71	0	

== Games ==
All times local.

March 16, 2004; 16:00	Ireland	3 - 8 (2-2, 1-4, 0-2)	Mexico

March 16, 2004; 20:00	Turkey	5 - 7 (2–5, 1–1, 2–1)	Iceland	Attendance: 890

Game reference

Cihan Kahraman
Omer Aybebs
Goalies
Gunnlaugur Bjornsson

	0-1	03:45 - Jonsson (Bjarnason) (PP)
	0-2	05:00 - Sigurdsson (Hrafnsson, Jonsson)
10:48 - Eroglu (Ozmen, Ergin)	1-2
11:08 - Yapicilar (Bayramoglu)	2-2
	2-3	14:17 - Gislason (Heimisson)
	2-4	14:54 - Bjarnason (Hallgrimsson)
	2-5	18:22 - Jakobsson (Heimisson, Bjorgvinsson)
	2-6	22:38 - Magnusson (Bjorgvinsson)
33:45 - Ciplak (Dinc, Polatoglu)	3-6
47:11 - Coskun (PS)	4-6
	4-7	49:39 - Magnusson (Jonsson, McCormick) (PP)
54:58 - Eroglu (Tasdemir, Hamarat) (PP)	5-7

24 min
Penalties
41 min

March 17, 2004; 20:00	Armenia	1 - 15 (1-3, 0-5, 0-7)	Ireland	Attendance: 378

Game reference

Mher Hovhanisyan
Goalies
Dermot Carney
Kevin Kelly
Referee:
Benny Haxelmans (Belgium)

09:49 - Khachatryan (Partamyan) (PP)	1-0
	1-1	11:53 - Leckey (Jurovich, Gibson) (PP)
	1-2	12:24 - Jurovich (MacNiell)
	1-3	14:01 - Morrison (MacNiell)
	1-4	20:48 - McKeag (Hamill) (PP)
	1-5	24:52 - Morrison (Healy)
	1-6	33:51 - Bowes
	1-7	35:29 - Gibson (Jurovich, MacNiell)
	1-8	36:58 - Kennedy (Leckey)
	1-9	44:44 - Kelly (Jurovich)
	1-10	48:20 - Morrison (Lyne)
	1-11	48:37 - Slavashevskiy (Morrison)
	1-12	49:14 - Jurovich (Kelly)
	1-13	49:41 - White (Bowes, Healy)
	1-14	51:38 - Lyne
	1-15	53:02 - Hamill (Bowes)

8 min
Penalties
30 min
20
Shots
72

March 18, 2004; 16:30	Mexico	2 - 3 (0-1, 1-0, 1-2)	Turkey

March 18, 2004; 20:00	Iceland	30 - 0 (13-0, 13-0, 4-0)	Armenia	Attendance: 1462

Game reference

Birgir Sveinsson
Goalies
Mher Hovhanisyan
Armen Lalayan
Referee:
Jacob Grumsen (Denmark)

01:25 - Runarsson (Jonsson, Runarsson) (PP)	1-0
02:45 - Magnusson (Gislason)	2-0
04:43 - Sigurdsson (Runarsson)	3-0
04:50 - Runarsson (Hallgrimsson)	4-0
11:07 - Jonsson (Gislason, Runarsson)	5-0
12:03 - Eriksson	6-0
14:38 - Runarsson (Jonsson, Sigurdsson)	7-0
15:44 - Thormodsson (Gislason)	8-0
16:06 - Magnusson (Devine)	9-0
17:38 - Sigurdsson (Jonsteinsson, Heimisson)	10-0
18:37 - Eriksson (McCormick, Runarsson)	11-0
19:39 - Devine (Jonsteinsson)	12-0
19:59 - Jonsson (Sigurdsson, Devine)	13-0
21:04 - Jonsteinsson (Runarsson)	14-0
22:05 - Hallgrimsson (McCormick)	15-0
24:38 - Heimisson (Runarsson) (PP)	16-0
26:52 - Jakobsson	17-0
29:06 - Hallgrimsson (Heimisson)	18-0
29:50 - Magnusson (Gislason, Runarsson)	19-0
33:56 - Runarsson (Jonsteinsson)	20-0
34:31 - Hallgrimsson (McCormick)	21-0
35:55 - Jakobsson (Bjorgvinsson, Gislason)	22-0
36:26 - Magnusson (Gislason, Devine)	23-0
37:40 - Runarsson (McCormick, Hallgrimsson) (PP)	24-0
39:28 - Magnusson (Bjorgvinsson)	25-0
39:54 - Gislason (Magnusson)	26-0
52:26 - Heimisson	27-0
55:14 - Bjorgvinsson	28-0
56:35 - Asgrimsson (Devine)	29-0
59:25 - Asgrimsson (McCormick, Hallgrimsson)	30-0

4 min
Penalties
8 min
77
Shots
4

March 19, 2004; 20:00	Ireland	1 - 7 (1-1, 0-6, 0-0)	Iceland	Attendance: 938

Game reference

Kevin Kelly
Goalies
Gunnlaugur Bjornsson
Referee:
Benny Haxelmans (Belgium)

	0-1	04:09 - Jonsson (Asgrimsson, Bjarnason) (PP)
12:10 - Gibson (Slavashevskiy)	1-1
	1-2	25:22 - Jonsson (McCormick, Jakobsson)
	1-3	28:00 - Magnusson (Gislason, Jakobsson) (SH)
	1-4	31:11 - Sigurdsson (Runarsson, McCormick)
	1-5	32:57 - Asgrimsson (SH)
	1-6	36:02 - McCormick (Jonsson, Runarsson)
	1-7	37:54 - Magnusson (Heimisson, Jakobsson) (PP)

10 min
Penalties
28 min
24
Shots
46

March 20, 2004; 16:30	Turkey	7 - 4 (2-1, 4-0, 1-3)	Ireland	Attendance: 303

Game reference

Omer Aybebs
Goalies
Kevin Kelly
Referee:
Jacob Grumsen (Denmark)

	0-1	04:10 - Hamill (Morrison)
18:57 - Ciplak	1-1
19:19 - Eroglu (Ozmen)	2-1
20:30 - Eroglu (Ciplak, Yapicilar) (PP)	3-1
28:48 - Eroglu (Ciplak, Coskun) (PP)	4-1
32:58 - Ergin (Ozmen, Eroglu)	5-1
38:53 - Ciplak (Hamarat) (PP)	6-1
	6-2	40:25 - Morrison (Bowes, Hamill) (PP)
	6-3	41:37 - Morrison (PP)
	6-4	47:48 - Jurovich (Morrison) (PP)
57:14 - Ciplak (Yapicilar, Tasdemir)	7-4

40 min
Penalties
71 min
42
Shots
27

March 20, 2004; 20:00	Mexico	17 - 0 (3-0, 9-0, 5-0)	Armenia	Attendance: 313

Game reference

Alfonso de Alba
Rodrigo Gutierrez
Goalies
Mher Hovhanisyan
Referee:
Benny Haxelmans (Belgium)

06:15 - Sanchez (Guerra, Miller)	1-0
14:01 - Sanchez (Miller)	2-0
19:02 - Sanchez (Glennie, Guerra) (PP)	3-0
25:05 - Roberts (Glennie)	4-0
28:23 - Sanchez (Terrones, Rosado)	5-0
28:54 - Sanchez (Roberts)	6-0
30:40 - Guerra (Lozano)	7-0
30:54 - Gomez Mont	8-0
32:11 - Glennie (Chabat)	9-0
33:38 - Sanchez (Ugarte)	10-0
34:45 - Miller (Sanchez)	11-0
35:21 - Sierra	12-0
40:11 - Sanchez (Roberts)	13-0
43:34 - De Sayve (Roberts, Rosado)	14-0
43:54 - Sanchez (Guerra, Sierra)	15-0
48:35 - Rosado (Miller, Roberts)	16-0
49:44 - Ugarte (Roberts)	17-0

0 min
Penalties
2 min
107
Shots
11

March 21, 2004; 16:30	Armenia	1 - 11 (0-7, 1-3, 0-1)	Turkey	Attendance: 518

Game reference

Mher Hovhanisyan
Goalies
Cihan Kahraman
Omer Aybebs
Referee:
Jacob Grumsen (Denmark)

	0-1	01:53 - Bayramoglu (Hamarat, Ozmen)
	0-2	05:03 - Ozmen (Hamarat, Bayramoglu)
	0-3	13:06 - Yapicilar (Kaytaz)
	0-4	13:41 - Bayramoglu (Ergin)
	0-5	13:59 - Arasan (Goven)
	0-6	15:15 - Ture (Polatoglu)
	0-7	16:15 - Ergin (Ozmen, Ozturk)
	0-8	21:08 - Yapicilar (Kaytaz, Tasdemir)
	0-9	24:33 - Yapicilar (Tasdemir, Eroglu)
	0-10	29:32 - Goven
34:57 - Kajberouni (Yeghyayan)	1-10
	1-11	51:30 - Ture (EN)

4 min
Penalties
4 min
1
Shots
48

March 21, 2004; 20:00	Iceland	2 - 2 (1-1, 0-0, 1,1)	Mexico

== Scoring leaders ==
List shows the top ten players sorted by points, then goals.

Player	GP	G	A	Pts	+/−	PIM	POS
(Iceland) Jonas Magnusson	4	10	2	12	+10	31	F
(Mexico) Juan Pablo Roberts	4	3	8	11	+7	4	F
(Iceland) Ingvar Jonsson	4	5	5	10	+12	4	D
(Iceland) Jon Gislason	4	3	7	10	+12	0	F
(Iceland) Clark McCormick	4	1	9	10	+12	6	F
(Turkey) Onur Eroglu	4	6	3	9	+5	2	F
(Turkey) Cengiz Ciplak	4	5	3	8	+7	8	F
(Iceland) Runar Runarsson	4	4	4	8	+11	0	F
(Republic of Ireland) Lawrence Jurovich	4	4	4	8	+3	2	F
(Iceland) Dadi Heimisson	4	2	6	8	+6	4	F
