= 2003 IIHF World Championship Division III =

International ice hockey tournament

Tournament details
- Host country: New Zealand
- Venue(s): Auckland
- Dates: 3–6 April
- Teams: 3

Final positions
- Champions: New Zealand

Tournament statistics
- Games played: 3
- Scoring leader(s): (New Zealand) Eugene Nesterov (9 pts)

The 2003 IIHF World Championship Division III was an international ice hockey tournament run by the International Ice Hockey Federation. The tournament was contested on 3–6 April 2003 in Auckland, New Zealand. New Zealand won the championship and gained promotion, along with Luxembourg, into the 2004 Division II tournament.

== Participants ==
Team	2002 result
Turkey	Placed 6th in Division II Group A and were relegated.
Luxembourg	Placed 6th in Division II Group B and were relegated.
New Zealand	Placed 3rd in Division II Qualification and were relegated.

== Standings ==
Pos	Team	Pld	W	D	L	GF	GA	GD	Pts	Promotion
1	New Zealand	2	2	0	0	14	3	+11	4	Promoted to Division II for 2004
2	Luxembourg	2	1	0	1	7	10	−3	2	Promoted to Division II for 2004
3	Turkey	2	0	0	2	4	12	−8	0	

== Games ==
All times local.

April 3, 2003; 19:15	New Zealand	7 - 1 (2-0, 2-1, 3-0)	Turkey	Attendance: 300

April 5, 2003; 16:45	Luxembourg	2 - 7 (1-3, 0-3, 1-1)	New Zealand	Attendance: 300

April 6, 2003; 16:15	Turkey	3 - 5 (1-1, 0-0, 2-4)	Luxembourg	Attendance: 700

== Scoring leaders ==
List shows the top ten players sorted by points, then goals.

Player	GP	G	A	Pts	+/−	PIM	POS
(New Zealand) Eugene Nesterov	2	6	3	9	+7	2	F
(New Zealand) Dennis Monk	2	3	2	5	+5	0	F
(New Zealand) Duane Finch	2	3	1	4	+2	0	D
(Turkey) Emrah Ozmen	2	2	2	4	-1	2	F
(Luxembourg) Benny Welter	2	3	0	3	0	0	F
(Luxembourg) Jean-Marie Funk	2	1	2	3	0	2	F
(Turkey) Bekir Akgul	2	1	2	3	0	14	F
(New Zealand) Darren Blong	2	0	3	3	+4	4	F
(New Zealand) Michael Sam	2	0	3	3	+1	16	F
(Luxembourg) Robert Post	2	1	1	2	-2	0	F

== Leading goaltenders ==
Only the top five goaltenders, based on save percentage, who have played 40% of their team's minutes are included in this list.

Player	MIP	SOG	GA	GAA	SVS%	SO
(New Zealand) Greg Davis	120:00	56	3	1.50	94.64	0
(Turkey) Omer Aybers	99:28	58	8	4.83	86.21	0
(Luxembourg) Michel Welter	120:00	71	10	5.00	85.92	0
