= 2010 IIHF World Championship Division III =

Ice hockey tournament in Luxembourg and Armenia

Tournament details
- Host countries: Luxembourg; Armenia
- Venue(s): 2 (in 2 host cities)
- Dates: 14–17 April 2010 (A); 14–18 April 2010 (B)
- Teams: 8

The 2010 IIHF World Championship Division III was a pair of international ice hockey tournaments organized by the International Ice Hockey Federation. The tournaments were contested between 14 and 18 April 2010. For the first time, the IIHF allowed eight teams, rather than six, to compete in Division III, which was handled by separating the teams into two groups. Group A was played in Kockelscheuer, Luxembourg, while Group B's games took place in Yerevan, Armenia. The process reverted to the single group of six teams the following year.

The IIHF announced on 5 February 2010 that the Division III Group A championship would be moved from Athens, Greece to Kockelscheuer, Luxembourg after the Hellenic Ice Sports Federation announced they would not able to host the tournament after problems with government funding. Ireland and North Korea were both promoted to Division II for the 2011 World Championships. According to the IIHF, due to eligibility issues all games involving Armenia's became 5–0 wins for the opposing teams and Armenia was excluded from the final ranking.

== Group A ==
The Group A tournament was played in Kockelscheuer, Luxembourg, from 14 to 17 April 2010.

=== Participating teams ===
Team	Qualification
Luxembourg	Hosts; placed 3rd in Division III last year
Greece	Placed 4th in Division III last year
Ireland	Placed 5th in Division III last year
United Arab Emirates	First time competing in World Championship

=== Final standings ===
Pos	Team	Pld	W	OTW	OTL	L	GF	GA	GD	Pts	Promotion
1	Ireland	3	3	0	0	0	17	7	+10	9	Promoted to the 2011 Division II
2	Greece	3	2	0	0	1	10	5	+5	6	
3	Luxembourg (H)	3	1	0	0	2	8	10	−2	3	
4	United Arab Emirates	3	0	0	0	3	5	18	−13	0	

Source: IIHF
(H) Host

=== Match results ===
All times are local.

14 April 2010; 16:30	Greece	7–1 (2–1, 1–0, 4–0)	United Arab Emirates	Patinoire de Kockelscheuer; Attendance: 131

Game reference

Ntalimpor Ploutsis
Goalies
Khaled Al Suwaidi
Ahmed Al Dhaheri
Referee:
(Belgium) Benny Haxelmans

2:30 – Koufis (Papadopoulous)	1–0
	1–1	13:45 – Al. Dhaheri (Al Zaabi, Al Darmaki)
14:23 – G. Kalyvas (D. Kalyvas, Papadopoulous)	2–1
25:55 – Koufis (D. Kalyvas, Lempesis)	3–1
41:37 – G. Kalyvas (D. Kalyvas, Pachos) (PP)	4–1
49:13 – Pachos (G. Kalyvas) (PP)	5–1
53:09 – Koufis (Papadopoulous) (PP)	6–1
55:15 – G. Kalyvas (D. Kalyvas)(PP)	7–1

20 min
Penalties
20 min
32
Shots
35

14 April 2010; 20:15	Ireland	6–4 (0–0, 5–1, 1–3)	Luxembourg	Patinoire de Kockelscheuer; Attendance: 635

Game reference

Kevin Kelly
Goalies
Michel Welter
Philippe Lepage
Referee:
(Croatia) Vedran Krcelic

21:10 – M. Morrison	1–0
22:44 – M. Morrison (PP)	2–0
26:09 – Roberts (Martin) (PP)	3–0
26:59 – Ewen (Roberts, Adams)	4–0
	4–1	34:48 – Beran (Welter, G. Scheier) (PP)
38:10 – Roberts (Kelly) (PP)	5–1
43:09 – Dooley (O'Driscoll)	6–1
	6–2	44:56 – Welter (Dessouroux)
	6–3	47:32 – Linster (G. Scheier)
	6–4	51:38 – Schons (Beran)

47 min
Penalties
38 min
30
Shots
37

15 April 2010; 16:30	Greece	1–3 (1–0, 0–3, 0–0)	Ireland	Patinoire de Kockelscheuer; Attendance: 102

Game reference

Ntalimpor Ploutsis
Goalies
Kevin Kelly
Referee:
(Germany) Wilhelm Schimm

3:53 – D. Kalyvas (Papadopoulous, Tilios) (PP2)	1–0
	1–1	25:00 – Hamill (M. Morrison, O'Driscoll) (PP)
	1–2	32:35 – M. Morrison (Ewen, Martin)
	1–3	36:26 – M. Morrison (Hamill) (SH)

37 min
Penalties
30 min
15
Shots
38

15 April 2010; 20:00	Luxembourg	3–2 (1–0, 1–1, 1–1)	United Arab Emirates	Patinoire de Kockelscheuer; Attendance: 495

Game reference

Philippe Lepage
Goalies
Khaled Al Suwaidi
Referee:
(Belgium) Benny Haxelmans

9:47 – Beran (R. Scheier, G. Scheier)	1–0
	1–1	24:23 – Al Dhaheri (Al Darmaki, Al Shamisi)
26:10 – Welter (G. Scheier)	2–1
	2–2	41:45 – A. Al Mazrouei (M. Al Mazrouei) (PP)
55:48 – Beran (Schons) (PP)	3–2

26 min
Penalties
16 min
42
Shots
29

17 April 2010; 16:30	United Arab Emirates	2–8 (0–2, 0–4, 2–2)	Ireland	Patinoire de Kockelscheuer; Attendance: 250

Game reference

Khaled Al Suwaidi
Goalies
Kevin Kelly
Adam Pepper
Referee:
(Croatia) Vedran Krcelic

	0–1	1:01 – Roberts (Dooley, Martin)
	0–2	16:55 – Adams (Hamill)
	0–3	28:02 – Dooley (O'Driscoll, Ewen)
	0–4	31:49 – Adams (Hamill, Ewen) (PP)
	0–5	37:00 – Kelly (Roberts) (PP2)
	0–6	38:40 – Balmer (M. Morrison)
	0–7	41:21 – Ewen (Dooley)
	0–8	44:49 – Dooley
51:20 – Al Dhaheri (Al Hadad) (SH)	1–8
58:35 – Al Dhaheri (Al Shamsi) (PP)	2–8

14 min
Penalties
16 min
16
Shots
32

17 April 2010; 20:00	Luxembourg	1–2 (0–0, 0–1, 1–1)	Greece	Patinoire de Kockelscheuer; Attendance: 1150

Game reference

Philippe Lepage
Goalies
Ntalimpor Ploutsis
Referee:
(Germany) Wilhelm Schimm

	0–1	29:31 – G. Kalyvas (D. Kalyvas) (PP2)
	0–2	52:23 – Lambridis (Efkarpidis)
56:27 – Dessouroux (Welter) (PP2)	1–2

60 min
Penalties
18 min
27
Shots
21

=== Tournament awards ===
Best players selected by the directorate

- Best goalkeeper: Kevin Kelly Ireland (52 saves from 57 shots on goal)
- Best Forward: Mark Morrison Ireland (4 goals, 2 assists)
- Best Defenceman: Francois Schons Luxembourg (1 goal, 1 assist)

=== Scoring leaders ===
List shows the top skaters sorted by points, then goals.

Player	GP	G	A	Pts	+/−	PIM
(Republic of Ireland) Mark Morrison	3	4	2	6	+3	4
(Greece) Dimitrios Kalyvas	3	1	5	6	+2	8
(Greece) Georgios Kalyvas	3	4	1	5	+2	4
(Republic of Ireland) Sean Dooley	3	3	2	5	+3	4
(Republic of Ireland) Gareth Roberts	3	3	2	5	0	2
(Republic of Ireland) Steven Ewen	3	2	3	5	+4	2
(United Arab Emirates) Juma Al Dhaheri	3	4	0	4	-1	4
(Luxembourg) Robert Beran	3	3	1	4	0	29
(Luxembourg) Benny Welter	3	2	2	4	-2	0
(Republic of Ireland) Stephen Hamill	3	1	3	4	+4	6
(Greece) Nikolaos Papadopoulos	3	0	4	4	+1	20
(Luxembourg) Georges Scheifer	3	0	4	4	+1	31

GP = Games played; G = Goals; A = Assists; Pts = Points; +/− = Plus/minus; PIM = Penalties in minutes; POS = Position
Source: IIHF.com

=== Leading goalkeepers ===
Only the top four goalkeepers, based on save percentage, who have played 40% of their team's minutes are included in this list.

Player	TOI	SA	GA	GAA	Sv%	SO
(Greece) Ntalimpor Ploutsis	179:39	90	5	1.67	94.44	0
(Luxembourg) Philippe Lepage	132:37	57	4	1.81	92.98	0
(Republic of Ireland) Kevin Kelly	160:00	57	5	1.88	91.23	0
(United Arab Emirates) Khaled Al Suwaidi	173:09	104	17	5.89	83.65	0

TOI = Time On Ice (minutes:seconds); SA = Shots against; GA = Goals against; GAA = Goals against average; Sv% = Save percentage; SO = Shutouts
Source: IIHF.com

== Group B ==
The Group B tournament was played in Yerevan, Armenia, from 14 to 18 April 2010.

=== Participating teams ===
Team	Qualification
North Korea	Placed 6th in Division II Group A last year and were relegated
South Africa	Placed 6th in Division II Group B last year and were relegated
Mongolia	Placed 6th in Division III (withdrew) last year
Armenia	Hosts; did not participate last year

=== Group stage ===
==== Standings ====
Pos	Team	Pld	W	OTW	OTL	L	GF	GA	GD	Pts	Qualification
1	Armenia (H)	3	3	0	0	0	31	8	+23	9	Gold medal game
2	North Korea	3	2	0	0	1	32	11	+21	6	Gold medal game
3	South Africa	3	1	0	0	2	17	14	+3	3	Bronze medal game
4	Mongolia	3	0	0	0	3	2	49	−47	0	Bronze medal game

(H) Host

==== Match results ====
All times are local.

14 April 2010; 16:00	Mongolia	1–22 (0–7, 0–9, 1–6)	North Korea	Karen Demirchyan Complex

Game reference

14 April 2010; 20:00	South Africa	2–9 (1–4, 1–3, 0–2)	Armenia	Karen Demirchyan Complex

15 April 2010; 16:00	South Africa	12–1 (5–1, 6–0, 1–0)	Mongolia	Karen Demirchyan Complex

Game reference

15 April 2010; 20:00	North Korea	6–7 (3–1, 2–5, 1–1)	Armenia	Karen Demirchyan Complex

17 April 2010; 16:00	North Korea	4–3 (1–0, 1–1,2–2)	South Africa	Karen Demirchyan Complex

Game reference

17 April 2010; 20:00	Armenia	15–0 (6–0, 5–0, 4–0)	Mongolia	Karen Demirchyan Complex

=== Playoffs ===
==== Bronze medal game ====
18 April 2010; 16:00	South Africa	8–3 (3–1, 1–2, 4–0)	Mongolia	Karen Demirchyan Complex

Game reference

==== Gold medal game ====
18 April 2010; 20:00	Armenia	2–5 (1–2, 1–2, 0–1)	North Korea	Karen Demirchyan Complex

=== Final standings ===
Rank	Team
1st place, gold medalist(s)	North Korea
2nd place, silver medalist(s)	South Africa
3rd place, bronze medalist(s)	Mongolia
DQ	Armenia

Promoted to the 2011 IIHF World Championship Division II
