= 2005 World Ice Hockey Championships =

2005 World Ice Hockey Championships may refer to:

- 2005 Men's World Ice Hockey Championships
- 2005 Women's World Ice Hockey Championships
- 2005 World Junior Ice Hockey Championships
- 2005 IIHF World U18 Championships
