= 2006 Men's Ice Hockey World Championships =

2006 edition of the Men's World Ice Hockey Championships

The 2006 Men's Ice Hockey World Championships was the 70th such event hosted by the International Ice Hockey Federation. Teams representing 45 countries participated in four levels of competition. The competition also served as qualifications for division placements in the 2007 competition. In the Division I Championship held in April, Germany and Austria were promoted to the Championship division while Israel and Croatia were demoted to Division II. In the Division II competition, Romania and China were promoted, South Africa and New Zealand were relegated to Division III. In the Division III competition, Iceland and Turkey were promoted to Division II for 2007.

The 2006 IIHF World Championship was held in Latvia between May 5 and May 21, 2006, with events being held in Riga. Sweden won the championship with a 4–0 victory in the final against the Czech Republic.

== Championship ==
The Championship division was contested from May 5 to May 21, 2006. Participants in this tournament were placed into groups of four with the top three teams in each group advancing to the qualifying round. Teams which finished last in the group were sent to the relegation round, from where the two bottom teams were relegated to the 2007 Division I tournament. The qualifying round teams were split into two groups of six with the top four advancing to the playoff round, and the bottom two eliminated from advancing. The playoff round was a knockout stage towards the gold medal game. The Championship was played in Riga, Latvia. Sweden won the gold medal game, defeating the Czech Republic 4–0. Kazakhstan and Slovenia were relegated to Division I for 2007.

Final standings

1. Sweden
2. Czech Republic
3. Finland
4. Canada
5. Russia
6. Belarus
7. United States
8. Slovakia
9. Switzerland
10. Latvia
11. Norway
12. Ukraine
13. Denmark
14. Italy
15. Kazakhstan — relegated to Division I for 2007
16. Slovenia — relegated to Division I for 2007

== Division I ==
Division I was contested from April 23 to April 30, 2006. Participants in this tournament were separated into two separate tournament groups. The Group A tournament was contested in Amiens, France. Group B's games were played in Tallinn, Estonia. Germany and Austria finished atop of Group A and Group B respectively, gaining promotion to the 2007 Championship division. Israel finished last in Group A and Croatia last in Group B and both teams were relegated to Division II for 2007.

Final standings

Group A

1. Germany — promoted to Championship Division for 2007
2. France
3. Japan
4. Hungary
5. Great Britain
6. Israel — relegated to Division II for 2007

Group B

1. Austria — promoted to Championship Division for 2007
2. Lithuania
3. Poland
4. Estonia
5. Netherlands
6. Croatia — relegated to Division II for 2007

== Division II ==
Division II was contested from March 27 to April 9, 2006. Participants in this tournament were separated into two separate tournament groups. The Group A tournament was contested in Sofia, Bulgaria. Group B's games were played in Auckland, New Zealand. Romania and China finished atop of Group A and Group B respectively, gaining promotion to Division I for 2007. South Africa finished last in Group A and New Zealand last in Group B and were relegated to Division III for 2007.

Final standings

Group A

1. Romania — promoted to Division I for 2007
2. Bulgaria
3. Belgium
4. Serbia and Montenegro
5. Spain
6. South Africa — relegated to Division III for 2007

Group B

1. China — promoted to Division I for 2007
2. South Korea
3. Australia
4. North Korea
5. Mexico
6. New Zealand — relegated to Division III for 2007

== Division III ==
Division III was contested from April 24–29, 2006 in Reykjavík, Iceland. Iceland won the championship and gained promotion, along with Turkey, into the 2007 Division II tournament.

Final standings

1. Iceland — promoted to Division II for 2007
2. Turkey — promoted to Division II for 2007
3. Armenia
4. Ireland
5. Luxembourg
