= 2006 World Ice Hockey Championships =

2006 World Ice Hockey Championships may refer to:

- 2006 Men's World Ice Hockey Championships
- 2006 World Junior Ice Hockey Championships
- 2006 IIHF World U18 Championships
