= 2005 IIHF World Championship Division III =

International ice hockey tournament

Tournament details
- Host country: Mexico
- Venue(s): Mexico City
- Dates: 7 - 13 March
- Teams: 5

Final positions
- Champions: Mexico

Tournament statistics
- Games played: 10
- Scoring leader(s): (Mexico) Adrian Cervantes (27 pts)

The 2005 IIHF World Championship Division III was an international ice hockey tournament run by the International Ice Hockey Federation. The tournament was contested on 7–13 March 2005 in Mexico City, Mexico. Mexico won the championship and gained promotion, along with South Africa, into the 2006 Division II tournament.

== Participants ==
Team	2004 result
Luxembourg	Placed 6th in Division II Group A and were relegated.
South Africa	Placed 6th in Division II Group B and were relegated.
Mexico	Host, placed 3rd in Division III.
Ireland	Placed 4th in Division III.
Armenia	Placed 5th in Division III.

== Standings ==
Pos	Team	Pld	W	D	L	GF	GA	GD	Pts	Promotion
1	Mexico	4	4	0	0	60	3	+57	8	Promoted to Division II for 2006
2	South Africa	4	3	0	1	47	12	+35	6	Promoted to Division II for 2006
3	Luxembourg	4	2	0	2	49	16	+33	4	
4	Ireland	4	1	0	3	32	20	+12	2	
5	Armenia	4	0	0	4	5	142	−137	0	

== Fixtures ==
All times local.

March 7, 2005; 16:30	Armenia	1–33 (0–11, 0–14, 1–8)	South Africa	Lomas Verdes

Game reference

Armen Lalayan
Goalies
Gary Bock
Ashley Bock
Referee:
Laurence Suggitti

	0–1	1:10 - Edwards (Boushy)
	0–2	1:34 - Woolf (Fraquet)
	0–3	3:21 - Fraquet (Bredenhann) (SH)
	0–4	5:22 - Woolf
	0–5	7:15 - Reinecke (Fraquet, Bodsworth) (PP)
	0–6	7:27 - Marsh
	0–7	7:47 - Santos (Boushy, Schulz)
	0–8	12:20 - Reinecke (du Plessis)
	0–9	14:44 - Santos
	0–10	17:12 - du Plessis (Ransby, Bodsworth) (PP)
	0–11	17:30 - Boushy (Schulz)
	0–12	22:26 - Edwards (Fraquet)
	0–13	25:30 - Boushy (Edwards) (PP)
	0–14	28:16 - Edwards (Bodsworth, Schulz) (PP)
	0–15	28:31 - Woolf (Giot, Fraquet)
	0–16	29:45 - Lyon (Valadas)
	0–17	30:31 - Lyon (Valadas, Minne)
	0–18	32:52 - Fraquet (Giot, Woolf)
	0–19	32:58 - Fraquet
	0–20	33:10 - Valadas (Lyon)
	0–21	34:16 - du Plessis (Matthews, Reinecke)
	0–22	34:35 - Edwards (Schulz, Boushy)
	0–23	37:45 - Reinecki (du Plessis, Marsh)
	0–24	37:56 - Edwards (Santos)
	0–25	39:07 - Lyon (Valadas, Marsh)
	0–26	40:20 - Reinecke (Burton) (SH)
	0–27	40:42 - Matthews (Bodsworth) (SH)
	0–28	41:32 - Bredenhann (Fraquet) (SH)
	0–29	47:31 - Fraquet
	0–30	47:56 - Minne (Valadas, Lyon)
	0–31	48:43 - Lyon (Marsh)
	0–32	54:07 - Woolf (Matthews)
	0–33	56:54 - Woolf (Fraquet) (SH)
59:08 - Yeghyayan	1–33

12 min
Penalties
8 min
6
Shots
57

March 7, 2005; 20:30	Mexico	2–0 (2–0, 0–0, 0–0)	Luxembourg	Lomas Verdes; Attendance: 1300

Game reference
Alfonso de Alba	Goalies	Michel Welter	Referee: Craig Hanson
7:19 - Ad. Cervantes / 1–0; 12:48 - Sierra (Glennie) / 2–0			Referee: Craig Hanson
22 min	Penalties	59 min	Referee: Craig Hanson
30	Shots	10	Referee: Craig Hanson

March 8, 2005; 19:30	Ireland	23–1 (9–0, 5–0, 9–1)	Armenia	Lomas Verdes; Attendance: 150

Game reference

Kevin Kelly
Emmet Dowling
Goalies
Armen Lalayan
Referee:
Bradley Albers

2:29 - Morrison (Darcy) (PP)	1–0
5:08 - Roberts (Morrison, Macneill) (PP)	2–0
6:01 - Martin (Daly)	3–0
6:57 - Lyne (D. Kelly)	4–0
8:27 - Hamill (Macneill, Lyne)	5–0
8:46 - Martin (McCabe)	6–0
11:40 - Hamill (Morrison) (PP)	7–0
17:17 - Cooper	8–0
19:08 - Martin (Roberts)	9–0
21:55 - Roberts (Martin, Morrison)	10–0
24:50 - Gibson (Martin, Roberts)	11–0
27:56 - Gibson (Martin, Darcy)	12–0
31:15 - Lyne	13–0
39:41 - Killen (Roberts, Bowes)	14–0
40:59 - Martin (Gibson) (PP)	15–0
45:22 - Martin (Roberts, Gibson)	16–0
	16–1	46:26 - Yeghyayan (Markosyan, Kajberouni)
47:59 - Morrison (Lyne)	17–1
48:10 - Roberts (Martin, Gibson)	18–1
49:32 - Bowes	19–1
52:26 - MacNeill (Bowes)	20–1
55:30 - Roberts (Martin)	21–1
55:35 - Roberts (Jurovich) (PP)	22–1
58:37 - Martin (Jurovich)	23–1

10 min
Penalties
32 min
54
Shots
5

March 9, 2005; 16:30	Luxembourg	8–4 (2–0, 3–0, 3–4)	Ireland	Lomas Verdes; Attendance: 200

Game reference

Michel Welter
Goalies
Kevin Kelly
Referee:
Laurence Suggitti

1:37 - Houdremont (Beran)	1–0
16:02 - Schons (Beran, Houdremont) (PP)	2–0
32:46 - Welter (Beran) (PP)	3–0
35:28 - Beran (R. Scheier)	4–0
36:39 - Houdremont (Welter, Beran) (PP)	5–0
43:17 - Houdremont (Thiry)	6–0
48:07 - Beran (Schons) (SH)	7–0
	7–1	50:21 - Darcy (Morrison, Hamill) (PP)
	7–2	52:49 - Martin (Gibson) (PP)
	7–3	53:26 - Jurovich
	7–4	54:59 - Hamill (Darcy, Morrison)
55:34 - Houdremont (Springer, Beran)	8–4

24 min
Penalties
22 min
28
Shots
35

March 9, 2005; 20:00	South Africa	2–4 (1–2, 0–0, 1–2)	Mexico	Lomas Verdes; Attendance: 1500

Game reference

Ashley Bock
Goalies
Alfonso de Alba
Referee:
Bradley Albers

5:31 - Reinecke (du Plessis, Valadas)	1–0
	1–1	11:46 - Chabat (Ad. Cervantes)
	1–2	19:31 - Sierra
41:05 - Boushy (Reinecke, Edwards)	2–2
	2–3	46:41 - Al. Cervantes (PP)
	2–4	49:44 - Ad. Cervantes (PP)

48 min
Penalties
18 min
15
Shots
34

March 10, 2005; 19:30	Luxembourg	38–3 (9–2, 12–0, 17–1)	Armenia	Lomas Verdes; Attendance: 100

Game reference

Philippe Lepage
Goalies
Armen Lalayan
Referee:
Craig Hanson

	0–1	4:16 - Kajberouni (Yeghyayan, Barkhanajyan)
4:30 - Schneider (Schmal)	1–1
5:07 - Kraus (Dessouroux)	2–1
7:34 - Dessouroux (Schons, Kraus)	3–1
9:25 - Dessouroux	4–1
10:02 - Dessouroux (Schons)	5–1
10:33 - Holtzem	6–1
12:44 - G. Scheier (Dessouroux, Milano)	7–1
13:52 - Scheier	8–1
18:07 - Schons (Dessouroux)	9–1
	9–2	19:10 - Kajberouni
20:30 - Kraus (Dessouroux)	10–2
24:22 - Beran (Houdremount)	11–2
25:32 - G. Scheier (Dessouroux) (PP)	12–2
25:46 - Welter (Beran, Houdremont)	13–2
26:09 - Beran (Thiry)	14–2
30:23 - Dessouroux (G. Scheier, Kraus)	15–2
31:55 - Houdremont (Welter, Beran)	16–2
32:01 - Schmal (Schneider)	17–2
33:48 - Houdremont (Beran, R. Scheier) (PP)	18–2
34:05 - Welter (Houdremont, Thiry)	19–2
38:01 - G. Scheier (Milano, Schons)	20–2
38:55 - Houdremont (R. Scheier) (PP)	21–2
40:22 - Houdremont (Beran)	22–2
40:49 - Houdremont (Beran)	23–2
43:00 - Beran (PP)	24–2
43:34 - R. Scheier (Houdremont, Beran)	25–2
46:16 - Beran (Houdremont, Welter)	26–2
46:25 - Beran (Welter, Houdremont)	27–2
	27–3	47:14 - Markosyan (Yeghyayan) (PP)
48:18 - Welter (Beran)	28–3
51:35 - Houdremont (Welter, Beran)	29–3
51:41 - Beran (Welter, Houdremont)	30–3
52:04 - Houdremont (Beran, Thiry)	31–3
52:25 - Holtzem (Schon)	32–3
52:49 - Holtzem (Milano)	33–3
53:07 - Funk (Dessouroux)	34–3
53:43 - Beran (R. Scheier)	35–3
54:46 - Schons (Meyer) (PP)	36–3
57:42 - Welter (Beran, Houdremont)	37–3
58:59 - R. Scheier (Houdremont) (PP)	38–3

6 min
Penalties
95 min
83
Shots
17

March 11, 2005; 16:30	Ireland	4–5 (1–0, 0–2, 3–3)	South Africa	Lomas Verdes; Attendance: 300

Game reference

Kevin Kelly
Goalies
Gary Bock
Referee:
Craig Hanson

8:33 - Hamill (Morrison) (PP)	1–0
	1–1	25:24 - Edwards (Reinecke, Matthews)
	1–2	30:13 - Woolf (Giot)
	1–3	44:29 - Woolf (Bodsworth, Giot)
	1–4	46:25 - Edwards (Boushy)
48:00 - MacNeill (PP)	2–4
48:45 - Gibson (Roberts)	3–4
	3–5	53:02 - Edwards (Reinecke)
59:59 - Roberts (Hamill) (PP)	4–5

18 min
Penalties
63 min
23
Shots
25

March 11, 2005; 20:00	Armenia	0–48 (0–13, 0–18, 0–17)	Mexico	Lomas Verdes; Attendance: 1100

Game reference

Armen Lalayan
Goalies
Andres de la Garma
Referee:
Bradley Albers

0–1	3:03 - Peon (Guerra, Potts)
0–2	9:54 - Chabat (Al. Cervantes, Ad. Cervantes) (PP)
0–3	10:06 - Sierra (Sanchez)
0–4	10:52 - Sanchez (Gutierrez Porter)
0–5	12:52 - Ad. Cervantes (Gutierrez Porter, Pinero)
0–6	13:08 - Ad. Cervantes (Chabat)
0–7	13:15 - Ad. Cervantes (Chabat, Al. Cervantes)
0–8	16:49 - Peon (Roberts, Glennie)
0–9	17:10 - Ad. Cervantes (Al. Cervantes, Gutierrez Porter)
0–10	17:26 - Ad. Cervantes (Al. Cervantes, Chabat)
0–11	18:31 - Glennie (Ugarte, Roberts) (SH)
0–12	18:48 - Glennie (Roberts, Ugarte) (SH)
0–13	19:42 - Glennie (Ad. Cervantes)
0–14	20:19 - Miller (Roberts)
0–15	21:21 - Al. Cervantes (Ad. Cervantes)
0–16	22:12 - Al. Cervantes (Chabat, Ad. Cervantes)
0–17	24:15 - Glennie (Ugarte, Roberts)
0–18	26:17 - Ad. Cervantes (Miller, Sierra)
0–19	29:55 - Glennie (Roberts, Sierra)
0–20	30:07 - Ad. Cervantes (Al. Cervantes, Potts)
0–21	30:38 - Ad. Cervantes (Chabat, Potts)
0–22	31:26 - Sierra (Sanchez, Cummings)
0–23	32:46 - Ortega (Peon, Guerra)
0–24	33:29 - Roberts (Glennie, Ugarte)
0–25	33:38 - Sierra (Roberts, Glennie)
0–26	33:57 - Chabat (Al. Cervantes, Ad. Cervantes) (PP)
0–27	35:23 - Sierra (Miller, Cummings)
0–28	35:58 - Pinero (Ortega, Guerra)
0–29	37:02 - Ugarte (Sierra, Glennie)
0–30	38:16 - Al. Cervantes (Miller, Chabat) (PP)
0–31	38:55 - Ad. Cervantes (Al. Cervantes, Gutierrez Porter)
0–32	43:50 - Cummings (Gutierrez Porter, Sanchez) (SH)
0–33	45:46 - Roberts (Glennie, Potts)
0–34	46:36 - Sierra (Glennie, Roberts)
0–35	47:49 - Ad. Cervantes (Gutierrez Porter, Pinero)
0–36	50:00 - Ad. Cervantes (Guerra, Potts)
0–37	50:44 - Pinero (Glennie, Sierra)
0–38	51:54 - Al. Cervantes (Ad. Cervantes, Chabat)
0–39	52:21 - Chabat (Al. Cervantes, Miller)
0–40	52:33 - Peon (Sanchez, Miller)
0–41	52:59 - Ortega (Peon, Roberts)
0–42	53:27 - Ad. Cervantes (Ortega, Guerra)
0–43	54:19 - Ugarte (Roberts, Potts)
0–44	55:32 - Roberts (Glennie, Pinero)
0–45	56:59 - Ad. Cervantes (Al. Cervantes, Chabat)
0–46	58:38 - Guerra (Ad. Cervantes, Ortega) (PP)
0–47	59:26 - Roberts (Ad. Cervantes, Pinero)
0–48	59:59 - Peon (Al. Cervantes, Ad. Cervantes)

54 min
Penalties
16 min
8
Shots
121

March 12, 2005; 16:30	South Africa	7–3 (3–0, 2–2, 2–1)	Luxembourg	Lomas Verdes; Attendance: 800

Game reference

Ashley Bock
Goalies
Michel Welter
Referee:
Laurence Suggitti

7:04 - Edwards (Bodsworth)	1–0
9:40 - Reinecke (Boushy)	2–0
16:26 - Reinecke (Edwards) (PP)	3–0
27:27 - Boushy (Reinecke) (PP)	4–0
	4–1	32:27 - Beran (Schons, Houdremont) (PP)
	4–2	32:57 - Beran (Schons, Houdremont) (PP)
38:34 - Boushy (Reinecke, Woolf)	5–2
50:38 - Lyon (Reinecke) (PP)	6–2
	6–3	59:37 - Beran
69:50 - Lyon (Boushy)	7–3

62 min
Penalties
49 min
22
Shots
20

March 12, 2005; 20:00	Mexico	6–1 (0–0, 4–0, 2–1)	Ireland	Lomas Verdes; Attendance: 2000

Game reference

Alfonso de Alba
Andres de la Garma
Goalies
Kevin Kelly
Referee:
Craig Hanson

21:28 - Sanchez (Sierra)	1–0
21:49 - Ad. Cervantes (Guerra)	2–0
30:20 - Glennie (Sierra)	3–0
34:27 - Sierra	4–0
47:25 - J.P. Roberts (Chabat) (PP)	5–0
57:07 - Ad. Cervantes (Al. Cervantes)	6–0
	6–1	G. Roberts (Keany) (PP)

51 min
Penalties
57 min
39
Shots
4

== Scoring leaders ==
List shows the top ten players sorted by points, then goals.

Player	GP	G	A	Pts	+/−	PIM	POS
(Mexico) Adrian Cervantes	4	17	10	27	+27	4	F
(Luxembourg) Robert Beran	4	12	15	27	+20	10	F
(Luxembourg) Ben Houdremont	4	11	12	23	+18	12	F
(Mexico) Alexis Cervantes	4	5	11	16	+17	4	F
(Mexico) Eduardo Glennie	4	6	9	15	+18	0	F
(Mexico) Juan Pablo Roberts	4	5	10	15	+18	8	F
(South Africa) Mackie Reinecke	4	7	7	14	+10	2	F
(Mexico) Roberto Chabat	4	4	9	13	+16	0	F
(South Africa) Michael Edwards	4	9	3	12	+13	24	F
(Republic of Ireland) Gareth Martin	3	7	5	12	+7	2	F

Source: IIHF.com

== Leading goaltenders ==
Only the top five goaltenders, based on save percentage, who have played 40% of their team's minutes are included in this list.

Player	MIP	SOG	GA	GAA	SVS%	SO
(Mexico) Alfonso de Alba	150:20	27	2	0.80	92.59	2
(South Africa) Ashley Bock	149:29	58	8	3.21	86.21	0
(Luxembourg) Michel Welter	180:00	87	13	4.33	85.06	0
(Republic of Ireland) Kevin Kelly	209:30	94	19	5.44	79.79	1
(Armenia) Armen Lalayan	240:00	315	142	35.50	54.92	0

Source: IIHF.com
