= 2005 Men's Ice Hockey World Championships =

2005 edition of the Men's World Ice Hockey Championships

The 2005 Men's Ice Hockey Championships were held March 7 – May 15, 2005, in 7 cities in 6 countries: Vienna and Innsbruck, Austria (Championship); Debrecen, Hungary (Division I - Group A); Eindhoven, the Netherlands (Division I - Group B); Zagreb, Croatia (Division II - Group A); Belgrade, Serbia and Montenegro (Division II - Group B); Mexico City, Mexico (Division III). The competition also served as qualification for division placements in the 2006 competition. It was a major professional tournament, because of the 2004–05 NHL labor dispute. This international event was the 69th such event sanctioned by the International Ice Hockey Federation (IIHF). The championship was won by the Czech Republic.

== Championship ==
The Championship division was contested from April 30 to May 15, 2005, in Vienna and Innsbruck, Austria. The participants were placed into groups of four with the top three teams in each group advancing to the qualifying round. Teams which finished last in the group were sent to the relegation round where the top bottom teams were relegated to the 2006 Division I tournament. Within the qualifying round teams were split into two groups of six with the top four advancing to the playoff round and the bottom two eliminated from advancing. The playoff round was a knockout stage towards the gold medal game. The Championship was played in Vienna, Austria. The Czech Republic won the gold medal game, defeating Canada 3–0. While Germany and Austria were relegated to Division I for 2006.

Final standings

1. Czech Republic
2. Canada
3. Russia
4. Sweden
5. Slovakia
6. United States
7. Finland
8. Switzerland
9. Latvia
10. Belarus
11. Ukraine
12. Kazakhstan
13. Slovenia
14. Denmark
15. Germany — relegated to Division I for 2006
16. Austria — relegated to Division I for 2006

== Division I ==
Division I was contested from April 17 to April 23, 2005. Participants in this tournament were separated into two separate tournament groups. The Group A tournament was contested in Debrecen, Hungary. Group B's games were played in Eindhoven, Netherlands. Norway and Italy finished atop of Group A and Group B respectively, gaining promotion to the Championship division for 2006. While China finished last in Group A and Romania last in Group B and were relegated to Division II for 2006.

Final standings

Group A

1. Norway — promoted to Championship division for 2006
2. Poland
3. Hungary
4. Japan
5. Great Britain
6. China — relegated to Division II for 2006

Group B

1. Italy — promoted to Championship division for 2006
2. France
3. Netherlands
4. Estonia
5. Lithuania
6. Romania — relegated to Division II for 2006

== Division II ==
Division II was contested from April 4 to April 16, 2005. Participants in this tournament were separated into two separate tournament groups. The Group A tournament was contested in Zagreb, Croatia. Group B's games were played in Belgrade, Serbia and Montenegro. Croatia and Israel finished atop of Group A and Group B respectively, gaining promotion to Division I for 2006. While Turkey finished last in Group A and Iceland last in Group B and were relegated to Division III for 2006.

Final standings

Group A

1. Croatia — promoted to Division I for 2006
2. Australia
3. South Korea
4. Bulgaria
5. New Zealand
6. Turkey — relegated to Division III for 2006

Group B

1. Israel — promoted to Division I for 2006
2. Serbia and Montenegro
3. North Korea
4. Belgium
5. Spain
6. Iceland — relegated to Division III for 2006

== Division III ==
Division III was contested from March 7–13, 2005 in Mexico City, Mexico. Mexico won the championship and gained promotion, along with South Africa, into the 2006 Division II tournament.

Final standings

1. Mexico — promoted to Division II for 2006
2. South Africa — promoted to Division II for 2006
3. Luxembourg
4. Ireland
5. Armenia
