= Armenia men's national ice hockey team =

Armenia
- Association: Ice Hockey Federation of Armenia
- General manager: Nikita Zbyshko
- Head coach: Vadim Guskov
- Captain: Eduard Malakyan
- Most games: Raffi Kajberouni; Simon Yeghyayan (12)
- Top scorer: Artem Kuznetsov (13)
- Most points: Maxim Kuznetsov (28)
- Home stadium: Ice Arena
- Team colors
- IIHF code: ARM
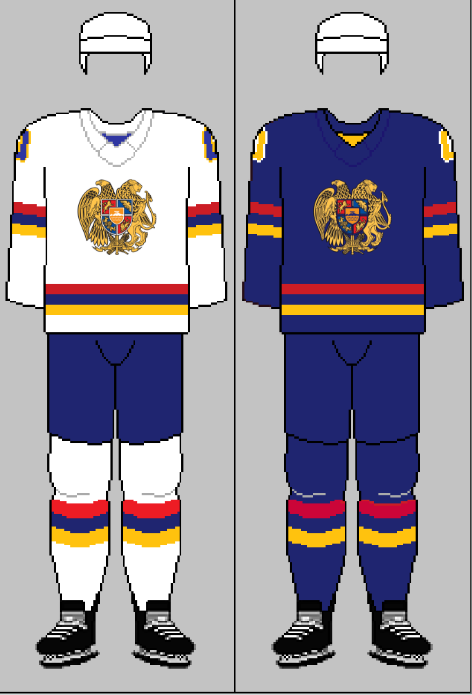

Ranking
- Current IIHF: 58 (3 June 2026)
- Highest IIHF: 45 (2004–2007)
- Lowest IIHF: 58 (2025)

First international
- (Lithuanian Soviet Socialist Republic) Lithuanian SSR 1 – 0 Armenian SSR (Armenian Soviet Socialist Republic) (Sverdlovsk, Soviet Union; March 1, 1962)

Biggest win
- Armenia 22 – 1 Georgia (Yerevan, Armenia; April 12, 2010); Armenia 24 – 3 Malaysia (Yerevan, Armenia; April 13, 2025)

Biggest defeat
- Mexico 48 – 0 Armenia (Mexico City, Mexico; March 11, 2005)

IIHF World Championships
- Appearances: 6 (first in 2004)
- Best result: 43rd (2006)

International record (W–L–T)
- 10–14–0

The Armenian national ice hockey team is the national men's ice hockey team of Armenia. They hosted the Division III, Group B tournament of the 2010 World Championships and they will be hosting the 2025 IIHF World Championship Division IV, officially hosting Ice Hockey World Championships for the second time. They are managed by the Ice Hockey Federation of Armenia.

== History ==
After finishing last in the 2004 and 2005 Division III tournaments (which included a 48–0 loss to Mexico), they won their first two games ever in 2006, defeating Ireland and Luxembourg.

In 2008, Armenia was forced to withdraw from a Division III qualification tournament in Sarajevo, Bosnia and Herzegovina, because Armenia's delegation refused to show their passports to IIHF officials; this incident resulted in a two-year suspension for Armenia from any IIHF tournament. The use of ineligible players was also discovered on Armenia's U20 team.

In 2010, the IIHF allowed Armenia to compete again, under conditions that Armenia was to release their final roster six months prior to any IIHF tournaments. Armenia hosted the 2010 IIHF World Championship Division III in Yerevan, Armenia. After large scale wins over South Africa and Mongolia, Armenia edged DPR Korea 7–6; Armenia later played DPR Korea in the gold medal game, but lost the final, as well as their chance to move ahead to Div II for 2011, 5–2.

Days after the tournament, IIHF officials investigated and reported that Armenia had once again used ineligible players; the team was suspended indefinitely, and their statistics and final scores were expunged from the IIHF tournaments, with all of their games marked as 5–0 forfeits against the team.

Armenia hosted the 2025 Division IV tournament, marking the nation's return to the international stage, and finished a close second.

Armenia currently holds 60th place in the IIHF World Ranking. In the all-Asian ranking published by the specialized outlet AsianIceHockey.com, the team sits 23rd.

== Tournament record ==
=== World Championships ===
Year	Host	Result	Pld	W	OTW	OTL	L
1954 through 1991		As part of the Soviet Union					
1992 through 2003		Did not enter					
2004	(Iceland) Reykjavík	45th place (5th in Division III)	4	0	0	0	4
2005	Mexico City	45th place (5th in Division III)	4	0	0	0	4
2006	(Iceland) Reykjavík	43rd place (3rd in Division III)	4	2	0	0	2
2007	(Republic of Ireland) Dundalk	Withdrew from tournament (All games marked as 5–0 forfeits)					
2008	(Bosnia and Herzegovina) Sarajevo	Withdrew from tournament; suspended for 2 years (Both games counted as 5–0 forfeits)	2	0	0	0	2
2009	(New Zealand) Dunedin	Suspended					
2010	(Armenia) Yerevan	Records expunged from tournament; suspended indefinitely (All games marked as 5–0 forfeits)	4	0	0	0	4
2011 through 2015		Suspended					
2016 through 2024		did not participate					
2025	(Armenia) Yerevan	54th place (2nd in Division IV)	5	3	1	1	0
2026	Kuwait City	Cancelled due to the 2026 Iran War					
Total		6 appearances	23	5	1	1	16

== All-time record against other nations ==
As of 19 April 2025

Team	GP	W	T	L	GF	GA
Bosnia and Herzegovina (Note: Armenia's first matches against Bosnia and Herzegovina and Greece, within the 2008 IIHF World Championship Division III Qualification tournament, were forefeited 0–5 by IIHF decision.)	1	0	0	1	0	5
Georgia	1	1	0	0	22	1
Greece	1	0	0	1	0	5
Iceland	2	0	0	2	4	35
Indonesia	1	1	0	0	14	1
Iran	1	1	0	0	8	0
Ireland	3	1	0	2	8	38
Kuwait	1	0	0	1	4	5
Luxembourg	2	1	0	1	13	44
Malaysia	1	1	0	0	24	3
Mexico	2	0	0	2	0	65
Mongolia (Note: Armenia's second match against South Africa and first match against Mongolia were additionally changed to 0–5 wins for the opposition by IIHF decision. Original results were 9-2 and 15–0, respectively. This also concerned first two matches against North Korea; the original results were 7-6 and 2-5, respectively. All four matches took place within 2010 IIHF World Championship Division III.)	1	0	0	1	0	5
North Korea	2	0	0	2	0	10
South Africa	2	0	0	2	1	38
Turkey	2	0	0	2	4	19
Uzbekistan	1	1	0	0	3	2
Total (15)	24	7	0	17	105	275

== Current roster ==
Roster for the 2025 IIHF World Championship Division IV.

No.	Position	Shoot/Catches	Name	Date of birth	Height	Weight	2024–25 Club
3	D	L	Petr Lebedev A	19 May 1984	179 cm (5 ft 10 in)	98 kg (216 lb)	(Armenia) Pyunik Yerevan
4	D	L	Eduard Malakyan C	16 November 2000	189 cm (6 ft 2 in)	96 kg (212 lb)	(Armenia) Pyunik Yerevan
5	F	R	Pavel Egiazarian	7 January 1979	182 cm (6 ft 0 in)	90 kg (200 lb)	(Armenia) Peppers Yerevan
8	F	L	Igor Krivykh	12 September 1999	184 cm (6 ft 0 in)	91 kg (201 lb)	(Armenia) Pyunik Yerevan
9	D	L	Samvel Davtian	9 April 1999	189 cm (6 ft 2 in)	129 kg (284 lb)	(Armenia) Peppers Yerevan
10	D	L	Arman Yenokyan	28 January 1995	180 cm (5 ft 11 in)	120 kg (260 lb)	(Armenia) HC Lions
16	D	L	Aleksei Ivanov	21 September 1995	190 cm (6 ft 3 in)	94 kg (207 lb)	(Armenia) Pyunik Yerevan
17	F	L	Arsen Ambartsumian	9 September 1998	169 cm (5 ft 7 in)	70 kg (150 lb)	(Armenia) HC Lions
19	F	L	Albert Gevorgyan	29 January 1993	180 cm (5 ft 11 in)	85 kg (187 lb)	(Armenia) HC Lions
20	GK	L	Harutyun Baluyan	22 August 1989	172 cm (5 ft 8 in)	60 kg (130 lb)	(Armenia) Pyunik Yerevan
21	F	L	Erik Mikayelyan	7 February 2003	175 cm (5 ft 9 in)	85 kg (187 lb)	(Armenia) HC Lions
22	F	L	Artem Kuznetsov	19 July 1992	173 cm (5 ft 8 in)	96 kg (212 lb)	(Armenia) HC Lions
25	F	L	Maksim Kuznetsov A	29 May 1989	176 cm (5 ft 9 in)	80 kg (180 lb)	(Armenia) HC Lions
51	F	L	Valentin Kovalenko	31 May 2001	183 cm (6 ft 0 in)	83 kg (183 lb)	(Armenia) Pyunik Yerevan
61	F	L	Arsen Asatrian	6 March 2006	184 cm (6 ft 0 in)	80 kg (180 lb)	(Armenia) Pyunik Yerevan
66	F	L	Sergey Kuzminov	8 July 1978	188 cm (6 ft 2 in)	85 kg (187 lb)	(Armenia) Peppers Yerevan
69	GK	L	Artem Putulian	28 October 2003	176 cm (5 ft 9 in)	78 kg (172 lb)	(Armenia) Peppers Yerevan
77	F	L	Sergei Khudiakov	7 January 1999	185 cm (6 ft 1 in)	76 kg (168 lb)	(Armenia) Peppers Yerevan
96	GK	L	Dmitriy Mazanko	21 March 1987	171 cm (5 ft 7 in)	83 kg (183 lb)	(Armenia) Peppers Yerevan
97	F	R	Tigran Manukian	30 January 1997	169 cm (5 ft 7 in)	75 kg (165 lb)	(Armenia) Pyunik Yerevan
99	F	L	Seiran Saghatelian	5 October 1999	182 cm (6 ft 0 in)	82 kg (181 lb)	(Armenia) BKMA Yerevan

== Coaches ==
Position	Name	Date of birth
Head coach	(Russia) Vadim Guskov	11 May 1991
Assistant coach	(Armenia) David Sazbandyan	30 May 1999
Goaltending Coach	(Russia) Mikhail Mikhailov	9 June 1987
General Manager	(Russia) Nikita Zbyshko	14 November 1995
Team Leader	(Armenia) Aram Sargsyan	3 August 1995
Medical Officer	(Russia) Yaroslav Zbyshko	19 February 1974

== See also ==
- Armenia men's national junior ice hockey team
- Armenia men's national under-18 ice hockey team
- Armenian Hockey League
- Ice hockey in Armenia
- Karen Demirchyan Complex
- Micah Aivazoff
- Sport in Armenia
- Yerevan Figure Skating and Hockey Sports School
- Zach Bogosian
