= 2004 Men's Ice Hockey World Championships =

2004 edition of the Men's World Ice Hockey Championships

Tournament details
- Host country: Czech Republic
- Teams: 16

Final positions
- Champions: Canada (23rd title)
- Runners-up: Sweden
- Third place: United States
- Fourth place: Slovakia

The 2004 Men's Ice Hockey Championships was the 68th such event hosted by the International Ice Hockey Federation. Teams participated at several levels of competition. The competition also served as qualifications for division placements in the 2005 competition.

== Championship ==
Final standings

1. Canada
2. Sweden
3. United States
4. Slovakia
5. Czech Republic
6. Finland
7. Latvia
8. Switzerland
9. Germany
10. Russia
11. Austria
12. Denmark
13. Kazakhstan
14. Ukraine
15. Japan — relegated to Division I for 2005
16. France — relegated to Division I for 2005

== Division I ==
=== Group A ===
Played in Oslo, Norway, between April 4–18.

Team	Pld	W	L	D	GF	GA	GD	Pts
Belarus	5	5	0	0	34	9	+25	10
Norway	5	3	1	1	31	14	+17	7
Netherlands	5	2	2	1	21	22	−1	5
Hungary	5	2	2	1	20	24	−4	5
Great Britain	5	1	3	1	18	18	0	3
Belgium	5	0	5	0	7	44	−37	0

=== Group B ===
Played in Gdańsk, Poland, between April 12–18.

Team	Pld	W	L	D	GF	GA	GD	Pts
Slovenia	5	5	0	0	33	5	+28	10
Italy	5	4	1	0	26	7	+19	8
Poland	5	2	2	1	25	14	+11	5
Estonia	5	2	2	1	26	23	+3	5
Romania	5	1	4	0	9	35	−26	2
South Korea	5	0	5	0	7	42	−35	0

Belarus and Slovenia were promoted to the 2005 Men's World Ice Hockey Championships. Belgiumand South Korea were demoted to Division II.

== Division II ==
=== Group A ===
Played in Jaca, Spain, between April 12–18.

Team	Pld	W	L	D	GF	GA	GD	Pts
China	5	4	1	0	39	13	+26	8
Croatia	5	4	1	0	32	6	+26	8
Australia	5	3	1	1	40	18	+22	7
Spain	5	2	2	1	29	13	+16	5
Israel	5	0	4	1	3	28	−25	1
Luxembourg	5	0	4	1	5	70	−65	1

=== Group B ===
Played in Elektrenai, Lithuania, between April 12–18.

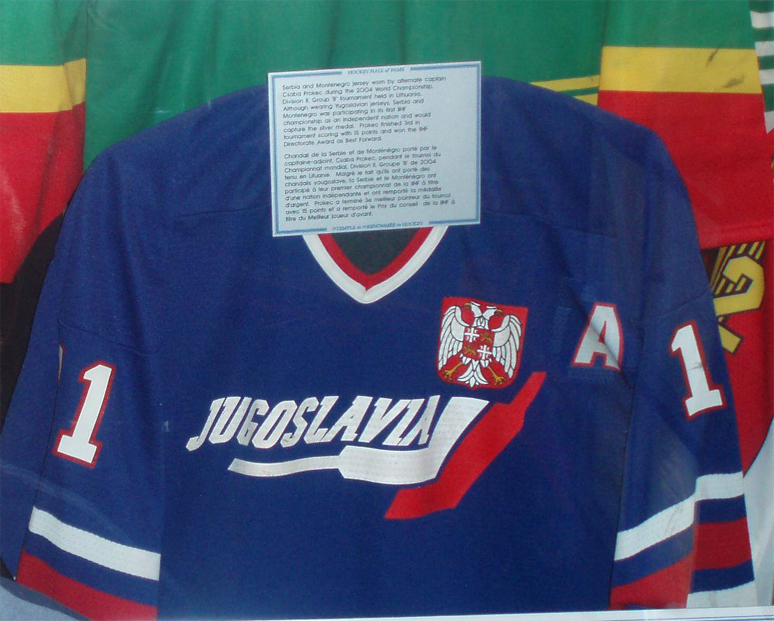
The jersey (now in the Hockey Hall of Fame) worn at the World Championships by Serbia and Montenegro

Team	Pld	W	L	D	GF	GA	GD	Pts
Lithuania	5	5	0	0	70	7	+63	10
Serbia and Montenegro	5	4	1	0	55	23	+32	8
North Korea	5	3	2	0	22	20	+2	6
Bulgaria	5	2	3	0	20	30	−10	4
New Zealand	5	1	4	0	13	61	−48	2
South Africa	5	0	5	0	9	48	−39	0

China and Lithuania were promoted to Division I while Luxembourg and South Africa were demoted to Division III.

== Division III ==
Played in Reykjavík, Iceland, between March 16–21.

Team	Pld	W	L	D	GF	GA	GD	Pts
Iceland	4	3	0	1	46	8	+38	7
Turkey	4	3	1	0	26	14	+12	6
Mexico	4	2	1	1	29	8	+21	5
Ireland	4	1	3	0	23	23	0	2
Armenia	4	0	4	0	2	73	−71	0

Iceland and Turkey were promoted to Division II.
