= 2007 IIHF World Championship Division III =

International ice hockey tournament

Tournament details
- Host country: Ireland
- Venue: Dundalk Ice Dome
- Dates: 15 April – 21 April
- Teams: 5

Final positions
- Champions: New Zealand

Tournament statistics
- Games played: 10
- Scoring leader: (New Zealand) Braden Lee (11 pts)

Awards
- MVP: (Republic of Ireland) Mark Morrison

The following teams took part in the Division III tournament, which was played at Dundalk, Ireland from 15 April 2007 through 21 April 2007. Mongolia made their debut at the World Championships during this tournament.

== Standings ==
Team	Pld	W	OTW	OTL	L	GF	GA	GD	Pts	Qualification
New Zealand	4	4	0	0	0	29	6	+23	12	Promoted
Ireland	4	2	1	0	1	20	8	+12	8	Promoted
Luxembourg	4	2	0	1	1	21	15	+6	7	
South Africa	4	1	0	0	3	17	16	+1	3	
Mongolia	4	0	0	0	4	3	45	−42	0	
Armenia	0	–	–	–	–	–	–	—	0	Withdrew

- Ireland and New Zealand were promoted to Division II.
- Armenia withdrew, so they were relegated to the Division III qualification.

== Results ==
15 April 2007; 13:00	Ireland	11–0	Mongolia	Dundalk Ice Dome

15 April 2007; 16:30	South Africa	2–5	Luxembourg	Dundalk Ice Dome

16 April 2007; 16:30	Luxembourg	10–1	Mongolia	Dundalk Ice Dome

16 April 2007; 20:00	New Zealand	4–2	Ireland	Dundalk Ice Dome

18 April 2007; 13:00	Mongolia	1–14	South Africa	Dundalk Ice Dome

18 April 2007; 20:00	Luxembourg	3–8	New Zealand	Dundalk Ice Dome

19 April 2007; 13:00	Mongolia	1–10	New Zealand	Dundalk Ice Dome

19 April 2007; 20:00	South Africa	1–3	Ireland	Dundalk Ice Dome

21 April 2007; 16:30	New Zealand	7–0	South Africa	Dundalk Ice Dome

21 April 2007; 20:00	Ireland	4–3 (OT)	Luxembourg	Dundalk Ice Dome

== Scoring leaders ==
Player	Country	GP	G	A	Pts	PIM
Braden Lee	New Zealand	4	7	4	11	10
Robert Beran	Luxembourg	4	4	6	10	8
Mark Morrison	Ireland	4	6	3	9	12
Brett Speirs	New Zealand	4	4	5	9	6
Laurie Horo	New Zealand	4	3	6	9	4
