= 2009 IIHF World Championship Division III =

International ice hockey tournament

Tournament details
- Host country: New Zealand
- Venue: 1 (in 1 host city)
- Dates: 10–16 April 2009
- Teams: 6

Final positions
- Champions: New Zealand
- Runners-up: Turkey
- Third place: Luxembourg

Tournament statistics
- Games played: 10
- Goals scored: 91 (9.1 per game)
- Scoring leader: (Luxembourg) Robert Beran (12 pts)

The 2009 IIHF World Championship Division III was an international ice hockey tournament organized by the International Ice Hockey Federation. The tournament was contested from 10 to 16 April 2009 in Dunedin, New Zealand. Mongolia withdrew from the tournament and therefore forfeited all of their games. Division III represents the fourth level of the Ice Hockey World Championships.

== Venue ==
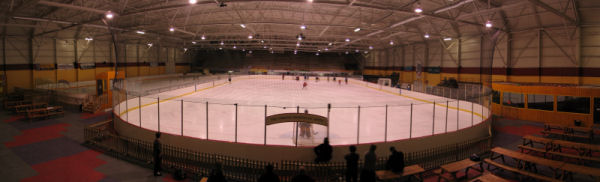
Dunedin Ice Stadium interior

All matches were contested at the Dunedin Ice Stadium, St. Kilda, Dunedin. This venue is the home ice of the Dunedin Thunder ice hockey team. The Dunedin Ice Stadium was used later the same month for the 2009 World Senior Curling Championships.

== Participating teams ==
Team	Qualification
Ireland	Placed 6th in Division II Group A last year and were relegated
New Zealand	Hosts; placed 6th in Division II Group B last year and were relegated
Luxembourg	Placed 3rd in Division III last year
Turkey	Placed 4th in Division III last year
Greece	Placed 5th in Division III last year
Mongolia	Placed 6th in Division III last year

== Final standings ==
Pos	Team	Pld	W	OTW	OTL	L	GF	GA	GD	Pts	Promotion
1	New Zealand (H)	5	4	1	0	0	32	7	+25	14	Promoted to the 2010 Division II
2	Turkey	5	4	0	0	1	28	14	+14	12	Promoted to the 2010 Division II
3	Luxembourg	5	3	0	0	2	26	18	+8	9	
4	Greece	5	2	0	1	2	18	21	−3	7	
5	Ireland	5	1	0	0	4	12	31	−19	3	
6	Mongolia	5	0	0	0	5	0	25	−25	0	Withdrew

Source: IIHF
(H) Host

== Match results ==
All times are local (UTC+12).

10 April 2009; 13:00	Mongolia	0–5 (forfeit)	Turkey	Dunedin Ice Stadium

10 April 2009; 16:30	Ireland	3–7 (0–2, 1–2, 2–3)	Greece	Dunedin Ice Stadium; Attendance: 200

Game reference

Adam Pepper
Goalies
Ntalimpor Ploutsis
Referee:
(Italy) Fabio Lottaroli

	0–1	13:59 - Kalyvas (Papadopoulos) (PP1)
	0–2	19:18 - Kalyvas (Adamidis, Koufis) (PP1)
	0–3	23:49 - Apostolidis (Kalyvas) (PP1)
25:14 - Morrison	1–3
	1–4	27:24 - Kalyvas (Iatridis)
	1–5	43:19 - Adamidis (Lambridis)
	1–6	45:20 - Koufis (Kalyvas) (PP2)
50:52 - Reynolds (O'Driscoll, Jackson-Wyatt)	2–6
54:39 - Morrison (Leckey) (SH1)	3–6
	3–7	55:01 - Kalyvas (Adamidis, Apostolidis) (PP1)

28 min
Penalties
16 min
54
Shots
37

10 April 2009; 20:00	Luxembourg	2–6 (1–1, 1–2, 0–3)	New Zealand	Dunedin Ice Stadium; Attendance: 780

Game reference

Michel Welter
Goalies
Zak Nothling
Referee:
(Japan) Hideki Yamauchi

	0–1	7:27 - Soffer
12:55 - Welter (Beran) (SH1)	1–1
	1–2	27:52 - Speirs (Lee, Down) (PP1)
33:44 - Welter (Beran, Scheier) (PP1)	2–2
	2–3	39:07 - Oak (Ball) (PP1)
	2–4	45:27 - Smith
	2–5	48:13 - Down (Soffer) (PP1)
	2–6	49:07 - Speirs (Oak, Nicholls) (PP1)

20 min
Penalties
16 min
18
Shots
41

11 April 2009; 13:00	Greece	5–0 (forfeit)	Mongolia	Dunedin Ice Stadium

11 April 2009; 16:30	Ireland	3–8 (2–2, 0–5, 1–1)	Luxembourg	Dunedin Ice Stadium; Attendance: 180

Game reference

Adam Pepper
Scott Bickerstaff
Goalies
Michel Welter
Philippe Lepage
Referee:
(United Kingdom) Nigel Boniface

	0–1	8:04 - Beran (Welter) (PP2)
10:43 - Jackson-Wyatt (Roberts)	1–1
15:20 - Roberts (McCabe, Morrison) (PP1)	2–1
	2–2	18:42 - Schram (Skamarakas)
	2–3	21:19 - Dessouroux (Holtzem)
	2–4	24:35 - Beran (Minden)
	2–5	26:56 - Welter (Beran, Scheier) (PP2)
	2–6	35:59 - Beran (Welter) (PP1)
	2–7	39:17 - Dessouroux
56:31 - Morrison (O'Driscoll) (PP1)	3–7
	3–8	58:54 - Schons

30 min
Penalties
42 min
41
Shots
39

11 April 2009; 20:00	New Zealand	8–2 (2–1, 4–1, 2–0)	Turkey	Dunedin Ice Stadium; Attendance: 560

Game reference

Rick Parry
Goalies
Eray Atali
Baris Ucele
Referee:
(Canada) Jamie Miller

0:11 - Argyle (Hay)	1–0
	1–1	0:49 - Toptaner (Solak)
10:32 - Eaden (Harrop, Hay)	2–1
	2–2	22:12 - Ozmen (Tasdemir)
24:38 - Eaden (Nicholls)	3–2
29:11 - Hay (Harrop)	4–2
34:53 - Argyle (Idoine, Soffer) (PP1)	5–2
35:51 - Speirs (Lee, Smith)	6–2
41:03 - Hay (Oak)	7–2
43:21 - Argyle (Speirs)	8–2

26 min
Penalties
38 min
53
Shots
18

13 April 2009; 13:00	Ireland	5–0 (forfeit)	Mongolia	Dunedin Ice Stadium

13 April 2009; 16:30	Luxembourg	4–7 (0–1, 1–4, 3–2)	Turkey	Dunedin Ice Stadium; Attendance: 200

Game reference

Michel Welter
Philippe Lepage
Goalies
Eray Atali
Referee:
(Japan) Hideki Yamauchi

	0–1	2:36 - Solak
	0–2	20:55 - Solak (Ozmen, Toptaner)
	0–3	23:05 - Ozmen (Hamarat, Solak) (SH1)
	0–4	32:03 - Yapicilar (SH1)
35:11 - Welter (Beran, Scheier) (PP1)	1–4
	1–5	38:25 - Tasdemir (Solak)
	1–6	42:00 - Ozmen (Toptaner, Solak)
52:32 - Mossong	2–6
55:28 - Beran (Scheier, Welter)	3–6
56:50 - Schons	4–6
	4–7	58:41 - Hamarat

16 min
Penalties
16 min
23
Shots
34

13 April 2009; 20:00	New Zealand	4–3 (OT) (0–2, 2–0, 1–1) (1–0)	Greece	Dunedin Ice Stadium; Attendance: 610

Game reference

Zak Nothling
Goalies
Ntalimpor Ploutsis
Referee:
(United Kingdom) Nigel Boniface

	0–1	11:02 - Kalyvas (Papadopoulos) (PP)
	0–2	12:21 - Papadopoulos (Apostolidis, Tilios) (PP)
25:12 - Oak (Lee, Speirs) (PP)	1–2
36:23 - Speirs (Lee)	2–2
	2–3	47:00 - Papadopoulos (Kalyvas)
56:41 - Soffer (Oak, Ball)	3–3
61:07 - Eaden (Speirs)	4–3

10 min
Penalties
22 min
47
Shots
15

15 April 2009; 13:00	Greece	2–7 (0–3, 0–2, 2–2)	Luxembourg	Dunedin Ice Stadium; Attendance: 180

Game reference

Ntalimpor Ploutsis
Georgios Fiotakis
Goalies
Michel Welter
Philippe Lepage
Referee:
(Italy) Fabio Lottaroli

	0–1	7:08 - Dessouroux (PP)
	0–2	12:06 - Welter (Beran) (SH)
	0–3	15:20 - Welter (Beran, Schons) (SH)
	0–4	33:37 - Holtzem (Dessouroux) (PP)
	0–5	37:02 - Funk (Scheier, Schram)
40:42 - Apostolidis (Kalyvas)	1–5
	1–6	47:36 - Minden (Beran) (PP)
48:25 - Adamidis (Koufis, Lempesis)	2–6
	2–7	55:14 - Scheier (Beran, Schons) (PP)

54 min
Penalties
16 min
28
Shots
41

15 April 2009; 16:30	Turkey	7–1 (3–0, 2–0, 2–1)	Ireland	Dunedin Ice Stadium; Attendance: 170

Game reference

Eray Atali
Goalies
Adam Pepper
Scott Bickerstaff
Referee:
(Canada) Jamie Miller

5:18 - Toptaner (Hamarat) (PP)	1–0
6:51 - Yapicilar (Hamarat, Ozmen)	2–0
16:32 - Yapicilar (Karakoc, Ozturk)	3–0
27:11 - Ozmen	4–0
35:33 - Halil (Tasdemir)	5–0
	5–1	43:46 - Morrison (Reynolds, Kelly) (PP)
45:53 - Gumus (SH)	6–1
51:37 - Tasdemir (Karakoc, Gumus) (PP)	7–1

46 min
Penalties
36 min
37
Shots
28

15 April 2009; 20:00	Mongolia	0–5 (forfeit)	New Zealand	Dunedin Ice Stadium

16 April 2009; 13:00	Turkey	7–1 (1–1, 0–0, 6–0)	Greece	Dunedin Ice Stadium; Attendance: 250

Game reference

Eray Atali
Goalies
Ntalimpor Ploutsis
Referee:
(Japan) Hideki Yamauchi

15:39 - Gumus (Cetinkaya) (PP)	1–0
	1–1	18:25 - Kalyvas (Papadopoulos, Apostolidis) (PP)
42:26 - Karakoc (Tasdemir)	2–1
43:07 - Karakoc (Yapicilar)	3–1
47:35 - Yapicilar (Karakoc, Gumus) (PP)	4–1
50:23 - Karakoc (Yapicilar, Ozturk)	5–1
55:09 - Yapicilar (Karakoc, Tasdemir)	6–1
58:36 - Ozmen (Solak, Hamarat)	7–1

37 min
Penalties
20 min
45
Shots
24

16 April 2009; 16:30	Luxembourg	5–0 (forfeit)	Mongolia	Dunedin Ice Stadium

16 April 2009; 20:00	New Zealand	9–0 (1–0, 3–0, 5–0)	Ireland	Dunedin Ice Stadium; Attendance: 1210

Game reference

Rick Parry
Goalies
Scott Bickerstaff
Referee:
(United Kingdom) Nigel Boniface

10:29 - Harrop (Hay, Ball) (PP)	1–0
23:34 - Rout	2–0
24:24 - Lee (Speirs, Nicholls)	3–0
24:59 - Ball (Eaden)	4–0
43:17 - R. Idoine (Eaden, L. Idoine)	5–0
47:10 - Lee (Speirs, Argyle) (PP)	6–0
49:49 - Speirs (Lee)	7–0
53:26 - Lee (SH)	8–0
54:07 - Eaden (SH)	9–0

42 min
Penalties
10 min
35
Shots
27

== Statistics ==
=== Tournament Awards ===
- Best players selected by the directorate:
  - Best Goaltender: (Greece) Ntalimpor Ploutsis
  - Best Defenceman: (Turkey) Gokturk Tasdemir
  - Best Forward: (New Zealand) Brett Speirs

=== Scoring leaders ===
List shows the top skaters sorted by points, then goals. If the list exceeds 10 skaters because of a tie in points, all of the tied skaters are left out.

Player	GP	G	A	Pts	+/−	PIM	POS
(Luxembourg) Robert Beran	4	4	8	12	0	20	F
(New Zealand) Brett Speirs	4	5	5	10	+5	0	F
(Luxembourg) Benny Welter	4	6	3	9	0	2	F
(New Zealand) Braden Lee	4	3	5	8	+5	10	F
(Turkey) Emrah Ozmen	4	5	2	7	+6	18	F
(Turkey) Serkan Yapicilar	4	5	2	7	+3	20	F
(Turkey) Yavuz Karakoc	4	3	4	7	+5	12	F
(Turkey) Alper Solak	4	2	5	7	+4	2	F

Source: IIHF.com

=== Leading goaltenders ===
Only the top five goaltenders, based on save percentage, who have played 40% of their team's minutes are included in this list.

Player	MIP	SOG	GA	GAA	SVS%	SO
(New Zealand) Rick Parry	120:00	45	2	1.00	95.56	1
(Turkey) Eray Atali	209:11	98	10	2.87	89.80	0
(Greece) Ntalimpor Ploutsis	221:07	175	19	5.16	89.14	0
(Luxembourg) Michel Welter	180:00	116	13	4.33	88.79	0
(New Zealand) Zak Nothling	121.07	33	5	2.48	84.85	1

Source: IIHF.com
