= Karen Demirchyan Complex =

Sports and concert complex in Yerevan, Armenia

Karen Demirchyan Sports and Concerts Complex
- Կարեն Դեմիրճյանի անվան մարզահամերգային համալիր
- Demirchyan Arena; Hamalir
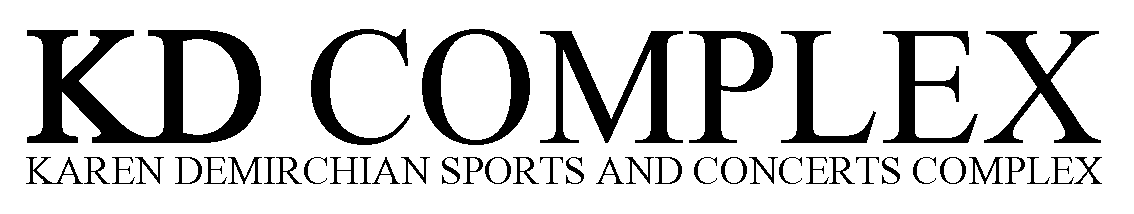

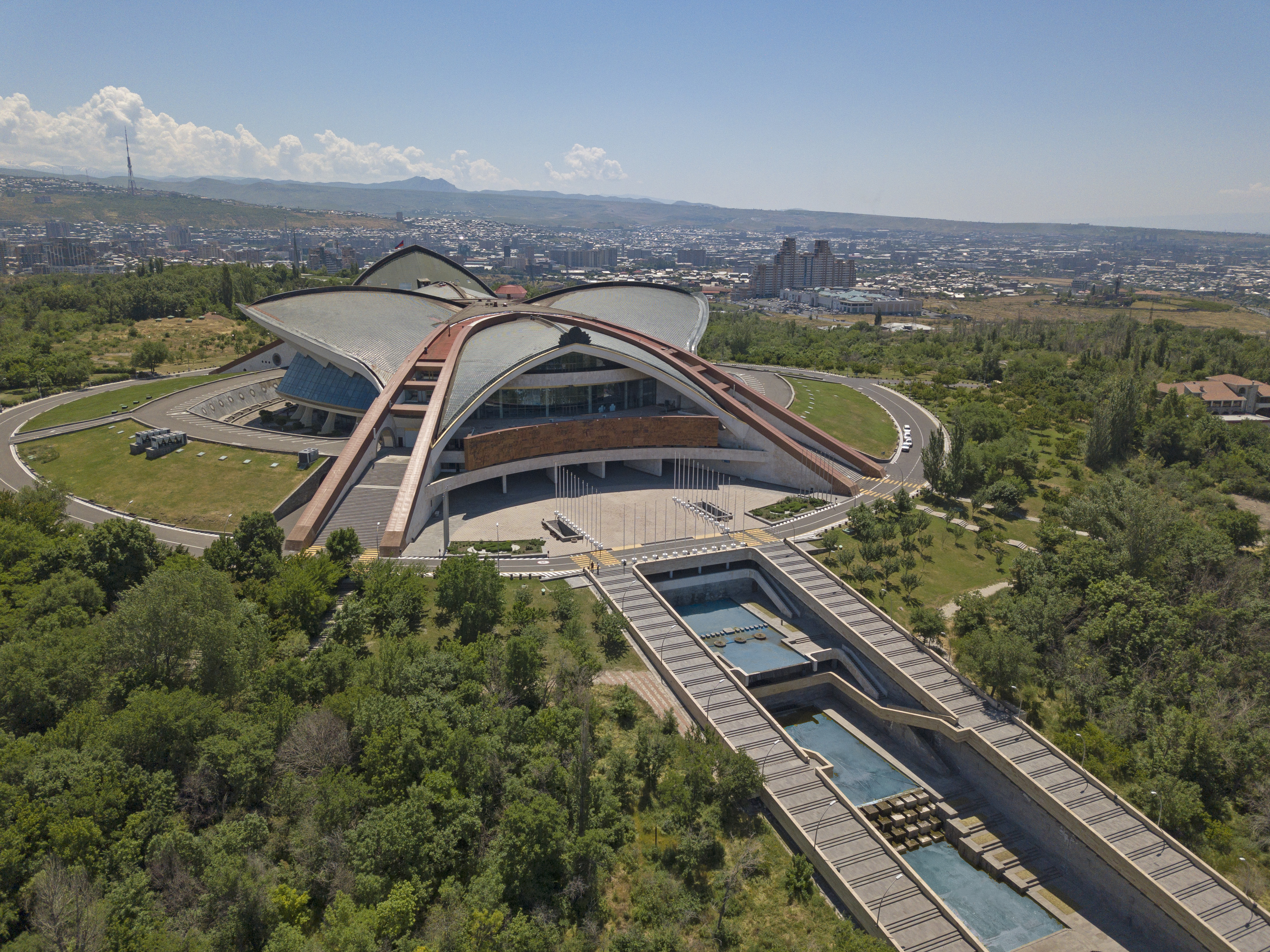
- The arena in 2019
- Interactive map of Karen Demirchyan Sports and Concerts Complex
- Full name: Sports and Concerts Complex named after Karen Demirchyan
- Location: Tsitsernakaberd hill, Yerevan, Armenia
- Coordinates: 40°11′17″N 44°29′00″E
- Owner: Government of Armenia
- Operator: Sports and Concerts Complex named after Karen Demirchyan CJSC
- Capacity: Arena: 6,274 (including rotating stand), 8,800 (expanded seats); Concerts hall: 1,032, (expandable to 2,040 with rotating stand)

Construction
- Opened: October 31, 1983
- Renovated: 1985–1987, 2005–2008
- Reopened: October 31, 2008
- Cost: US$ 47.7 million for renovations
- Architects: A. Tarkhanian; S. Khachikian; G. Poghosian; G. Musheghian

Karen Demirchyan Sports and Concerts Complex (Armenian: Կարեն Դեմիրճյանի անվան մարզահամերգային համալիր, romanized: Karen Demirchyani anvan marzahamergayin hamalir), also known as Demirchyan Arena, Sports & Music Complex, or simply Hamalir (for complex in Armenian), is a large multi-purpose sports and concert complex with 184 stairs leading up Tsitsernakaberd hill which dominates over the western parts of Yerevan, near the Hrazdan River gorge.

First opened in 1983, the complex consists of two main halls; the concerts hall and the sports arena, in addition to the large foyer, the small sports hall, the Hayastan conference hall, and the Argishti hall designated for diplomatic meetings, exhibitions, and other events. The complex underwent a major renovation throughout the mid 2000s and reopened in 2008.

== History ==
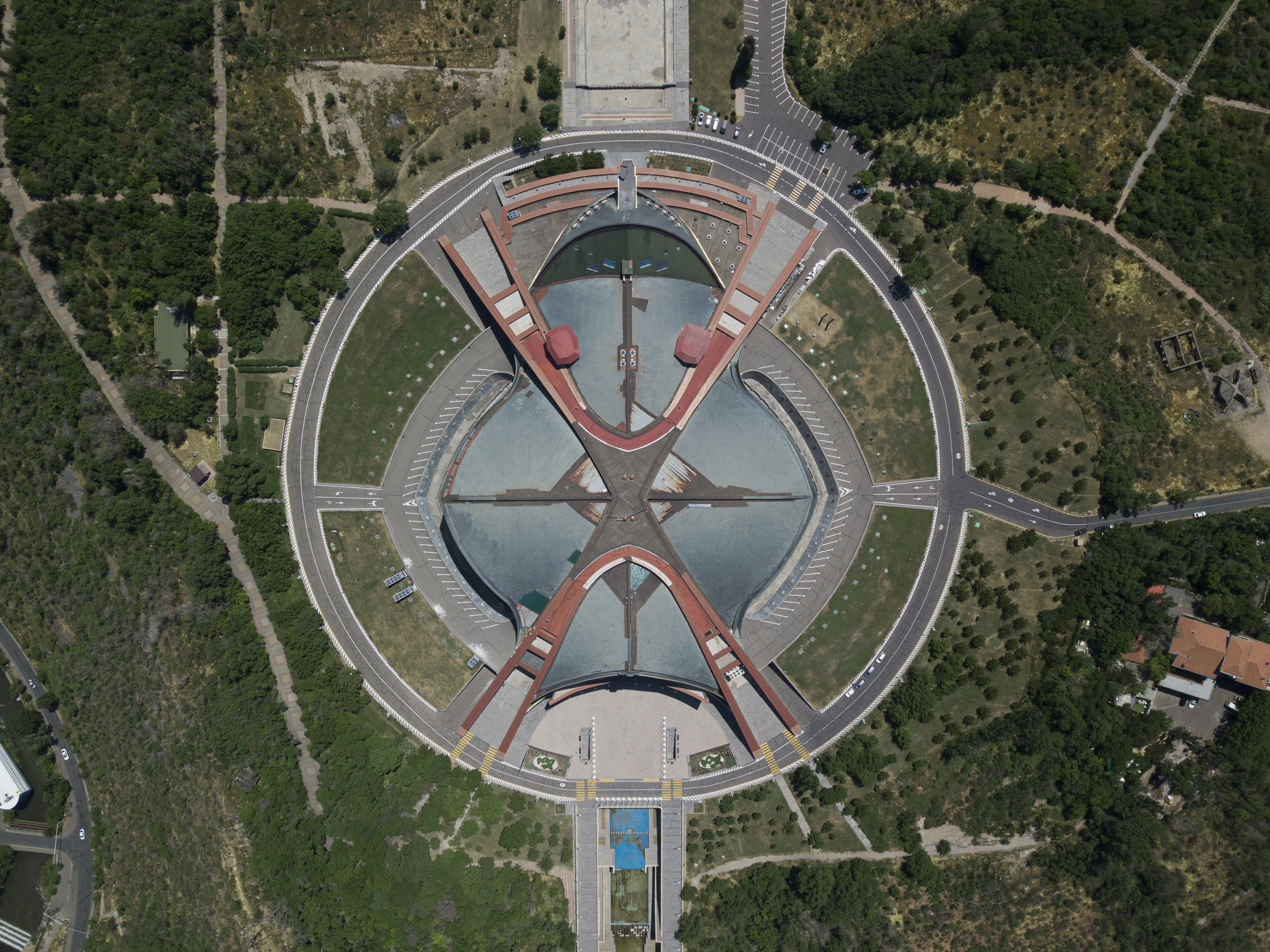
Top down aerial view of the complex in May 2019

The complex was opened in 1983 but was forced to close within a year and a half after a fire in 1985 for which Shavarsh Karapetyan participated in the rescue, badly burning himself in the process. A renovation process took place until the end of 1987 when it was ready again to host concerts and sports events. The complex was designed by a group of Armenian architects: A. Tarkhanian, S. Khachikyan, G. Pogosyan, and G. Mushegyan. The construction process was supervised by engineers Hamlet Badalyan (chief engineer), I. Tsaturian, A. Azizian, and M. Aharonian.

In 1990, Ian Gillan's band has played concerts there. The 32nd Chess Olympiad in 1996 and the 2001 World Wushu Championships also took place at the venue.

In 1999, shortly after the assassination of the former speaker of the Armenian parliament Karen Demirchyan in the Armenian parliament shooting, the complex was renamed in honour of him, for his contribution to the construction and the renovation of the complex during the Soviet era.

=== Sale and renovation ===
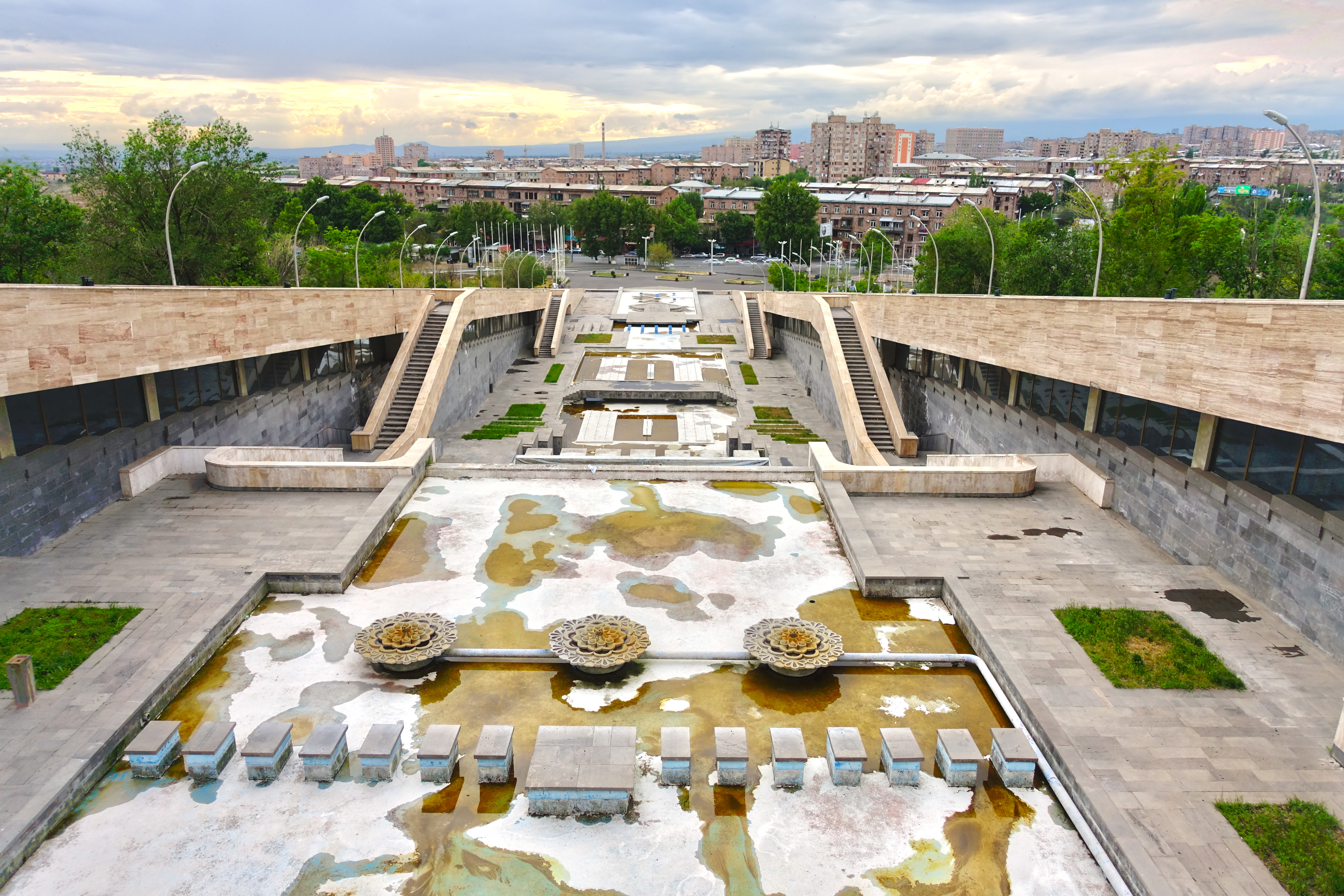
The stairs leading up to the Karen Demirchyan Complex (2018)

On October 9, 2005, the complex was sold for US$5.7 million. The contract was signed between the Armenian Government and the Russian BAMO Holding Company. Murad Muradian, an Armenian from Moscow, the head of the BAMO holding, attempted to gain the support of Yerevan citizens who were hesitant about the privatization of the building. Two conditions were put forward by the Armenian president Robert Kocharyan: The name of the complex must not be changed and it must preserve its functional meaning. The organization agreed to these conditions and a commitment to make an investment of nearly 10 million US dollars was envisaged for the upcoming three years.

The renovation lasted nearly three years and ended up costing 42 million US dollars, transforming the complex into a state-of-the-art venue for sports and concerts.

=== Reopening ===
The bronze statue to Karen Demirchyan stands in front of the complex named in his honour on Leningradyan Street

On October 31, 2008, exactly 25 years after its first inauguration, the second opening ceremony of the Karen Demirchyan Sports and Concerts Complex took place with the presence of president Serzh Sargsyan, catholicos Karekin II, Demirchyan's son Stepan Demirchyan and widow Rima, the Mayor of Yerevan, members of the Government, Members of Parliament, as well as various public, political, and cultural figures. Popular concerts and ice skating shows were included in the ceremony. The Russian figure skating legend Evgeni Plushenko was the surprise guest and performer of the day.

In August 2014, due to the accumulated debts of the owners, the Government of Armenia transferred the ownership of the complex to the Ministry of Defense. In August 2015, the government of Armenia decided to sell the complex to a private firm with plans to renovate the complex and turn it into a "family-oriented center" that would include "hotels, an indoor water park, concert halls, restaurants, shops, and a casino. After various economic scandals, shady dealings of the former owners, and the financial crisis that the country underwent due to the COVID-19 pandemic and the Nagorno-Karabakh conflict in 2020, the investment plan failed, and the Armenian state was forced to retake ownership of the complex. During the harshest months of the pandemic, the venue became a temporary hospital, admitting 2,000 patients.

During 2023, a commemorative bronze statue honoring Karen Demirchyan was installed at the entrance of the complex. The sculptural work was created by Sargis Babayan, while the architectural design was undertaken by Levon Arakelyan. The monument was formally presented to the public during a ceremonial event conducted in September, coinciding with the commemorative activities marking the fortieth anniversary of the Yerevan Sports and Concert Complex.

== Structure ==
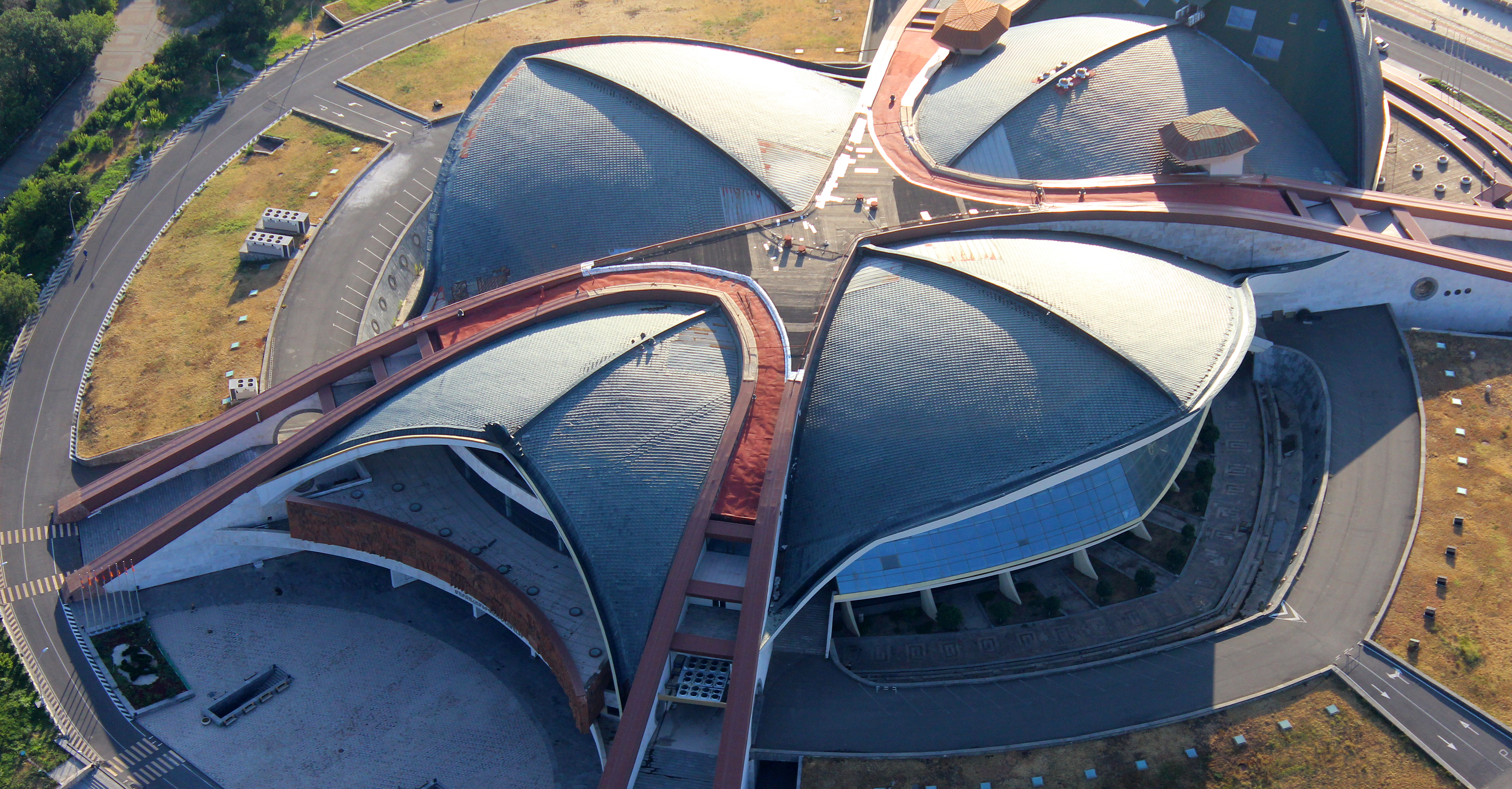
The complex from a bird's eye view

The main arena during a conference

The complex's external structure is designed in the shape of a large bird opening its wings. Stairs along a cascade of fountains lead visitors to the complex, which resembles the Sydney Opera House of Australia.

Its architectural concepts includes a revolving grandstand which can accommodate 1,200 people, with the possibility of connecting it to the other two halls of the complex to increase the seating capacity, a concept for which the architects and engineers who designed the complex were awarded the USSR State Prize, the highest of its kind, in 1987.

The complex consists of the following halls:

- The main arena is used for both sporting events and large concerts with a fixed seating capacity of 5,266, expandable to 6,274 when the rotating stand is used. It can be further expanded with additional seating to reach a maximum capacity of 8,800.
- The concerts hall with a fixed seating capacity of 1,032, expandable to 2,040 when the rotating stand is used. It is equipped with state-of-the-art sound and lighting systems. The hall is typically used for smaller concerts and corporate events.
- The small sports hall with a capacity of 300 seats.
- Hayastan conference hall is equipped with modern equipment purchased from European industrial companies, it has hosted discussions and presentations of the Youth World Boxing Championships.
- Argishti hall is used primarily for banquets, it is located next to the Hajastan conference hall.
- The large foyer is used for corporate events, exhibitions, presentations and other events.

== Notable events ==
After its renovation in 2008, the sports hall hosted a concert of one of the most renowned singers of Armenia and Armenian Diaspora, Harout Pamboukjian, while the concerts hall hosted the celebration concert of the 80th anniversary of the worldwide known Armenian musician and composer Djivan Gasparyan with songs and plays performed by Flora Martirosyan, Peter Gabriel, Pedro Eustache, Alan Parsons Project, Boris Grebenshchikov and others. The complex has also hosted many concerts.

- On 22 March 2009, the Canadian singer Garou performed at a concert in the sports hall within the frames of the Francophonie Days in Armenia.
- On 22 May 2009, British rock band Jethro Tull performed a concert in the sports hall.
- On 16 October 2009, the concerts hall was crowded with rock fans who came to enjoy the performance of the British rock band Uriah Heep.
- On 12 November 2009, the American jazz musician and singer George Benson performed a concert in the concert hall. The event was held within the framework of "Perspectives XXI" 10th Armenian international music festival.
- During April 2010, the arena hosted the 2010 IIHF World Championship (Division III) ice hockey tournament, where the Armenian team took a silver medal for Division III play after losing in the finals against North Korea.
- On 25 May 2010, the English rock band Deep Purple performed a charity concert with more than 10,000 fans filled the arena. The concert was a benefit performance, with proceeds going towards the construction of a music school in Gyumri, devastated by the 1988 earthquake.
- On 12 August 2010, the Armenian-American rock singer Serj Tankian of the System of a Down, performed at the complex.
- On 26 October 2010, the English singer Joe Cocker performed a concert in the concert hall during his "Hard Knocks" world tour.
- On 18 March 2011, international singer Lara Fabian performed at a concert in the sports hall within the frames of the Francophone Days in Armenia.
- On 3 September 2011, Vic Darchinyan defended his IBO bantamweight title beating Evans Mbamba during a fight of 12 rounds.
- On 3 December 2011, the Junior Eurovision Song Contest 2011 was held in the main arena.
- On 10 September 2012, Armenian rock-band Dorians among with special guests Glenn Hughes and Derek Sherinian gave a joint concert.
- In June 2013 Russian rock-band DDT, while being first time in Armenia, performed a concert in the concert hall.
- In October 2015, Charles Aznavour performed a concert in the concert hall. He has a personal dressing room in the complex.
- On 26 October 2017, the American jazz musician Marcus Miller performed a concert in the concert hall. The event was held within the framework of "Yerevan Jazz Fest 2017" annual international festival.
- On 9 April 2018, President Armen Sarkissian was inaugurated as President of Armenia succeeding Serzh Sarkisian.
- On 11 December 2022, the venue hosted the 20th Junior Eurovision Song Contest.
- On 13 April 2024, Russian rock-band Mashina Vremeni performed a concert in the concert hall.
- On 22 September 2024, Archbishop Bagrat Galstanyan held an important Christian-political meeting at the complex for the political party named after him, Srbazan Payqar.
- On 4 May 2026, the complex will host the 8th European Political Community Summit.

The details at the entrance to the complex

== See also ==
- Chess in Armenia
