= Luxembourg men's national ice hockey team =

National men's ice hockey team of Luxembourg

Luxembourg
- Association: Fédération Luxembourgeoise de Hockey sur Glace
- Head coach: Andrey Esipov
- Assistants: Michel Welter
- Captain: Colm Cannon
- Most games: Benny Welter (68)
- Top scorer: Benny Welter (63)
- Most points: Robert Beran (137)
- Team colors
- IIHF code: LUX

Ranking
- Current IIHF: 47 ▼1 (3 June 2026)
- Highest IIHF: 41 (2022)
- Lowest IIHF: 44 (2009–10, 2024-25)

First international
- South Africa 23–0 Luxembourg (Johannesburg, South Africa; 21 March 1992)

Biggest win
- Luxembourg 38–3 Armenia (Mexico City, Mexico; 10 March 2005)

Biggest defeat
- Spain 31–0 Luxembourg (Johannesburg, South Africa; 25 March 1992)

IIHF World Championships
- Appearances: 22 (first in 1992)
- Best result: 31st (1992)

International record (W–L–T)
- 51–72–2

The Luxembourg national ice hockey team is the national men's ice hockey team of Luxembourg. It is controlled by the Luxembourg Ice Hockey Federation and a member of the International Ice Hockey Federation. Luxembourg is currently ranked 43rd in the IIHF World Rankings and competes at Division II of the IIHF World Championships. They won their first tournament in 2017 at the Division III level.

== History ==
Luxembourg joined the International Ice Hockey Federation (IIHF) in 1912, though did not participate in the World Championship until 1992, when they placed fifth in Group C2, the lowest tier. They would not return to the tournament until 2000, though except for 2001 have been a regular participant since then.

The team plays in the colours of the national flag: red, white, and light blue. The squad is coached by Petr Fical of Germany and captained by Ronny Scheier. Monique Scheier-Schneider served as the team's general manager from the 2005 to 2007 world championships.

In the 2007 World Championships, Luxembourg finished third in Division III, narrowly missing out on promotion to Division II after being defeated 4–3 by hosts Ireland in overtime. Luxembourg has never competed in ice hockey at the Olympics. They placed third at the 2009 IIHF World Championship Division III in Dunedin, New Zealand. They won their first tournament in 2017 at the Division III level.

== IIHF World Championships ==
Year	Host	Division/Group	Group position	Overall position
1992	(South Africa) Johannesburg	Group C2	5th	31st
1993–1999	did not participate			
2000	(Iceland) Reykjavík	Group D	8th	41st
2001	did not participate			
2002	(Federal Republic of Yugoslavia) Novi Sad	Division II – Group B	6th (relegated)	40th
2003	(New Zealand) Auckland	Division III	2nd (promoted)	42nd
2004	(Spain) Jaca	Division II – Group A	6th (relegated)	39th
2005	Mexico City	Division III	3rd	43rd
2006	(Iceland) Reykjavík	Division III	5th	45th
2007	(Republic of Ireland) Dundalk	Division III	3rd	42nd
2008	Luxembourg	Division III	3rd	43rd
2009	(New Zealand) Dunedin	Division III	3rd	43rd
2010	(Luxembourg) Kockelscheuer	Division III – Group A	3rd	45th
2011	(South Africa) Cape Town	Division III	4th	44th
2012	(Turkey) Erzurum	Division III	3rd	43rd
2013	(South Africa) Cape Town	2013 IIHF World Championship Division III	3rd	43rd
2014	(Luxembourg) Kockelscheuer	Division III	3rd	43rd
2015	(Turkey) İzmir	Division III	3rd	43rd
2016	(Turkey) Istanbul	Division III	3rd	43rd
2017	(Bulgaria) Sofia	Division III	1st (promoted)	41st
2018	(Spain) Granada	Division II – Group B	6th (relegated)	40th
2019	(Bulgaria) Sofia	Division III	4th	44th
2020	(Luxembourg) Kockelscheuer	Division III	Cancelled due to the COVID-19 pandemic	
2021	(Luxembourg) Kockelscheuer	Division III	Cancelled due to the COVID-19 pandemic	
2022	(Luxembourg) Kockelscheuer	Division III – Group A	5th	41st
2023	(South Africa) Cape Town	Division III – Group A	5th	45th
2024	(Kyrgyzstan) Bishkek	Division III – Group A	3rd	43rd
2025	(Turkey) Istanbul	Division III – Group A	6th	46th
2026	Hong Kong	Division III – Group B	4th	50th

== All-time record ==
As of 19 April 2026

Opponent	Played	Won	Drawn	Lost	GF	GA	GD
Armenia	2	1	0	1	44	13	+31
Australia	2	0	0	2	0	29	-29
Belgium	4	0	0	4	4	36	-32
Bosnia and Herzegovina	4	3	0	1	30	7	+23
Bulgaria	4	1	0	3	17	36	-19
China	1	0	0	1	3	19	-16
Chinese Taipei	3	0	0	3	7	20	-13
Croatia	1	0	0	1	0	11	-11
Georgia	4	4	0	0	45	7	+38
Greece	7	5	0	2	45	17	+28
Hong Kong	5	4	0	1	29	11	+18
Iceland	2	0	0	2	2	13	-11
Ireland	8	5	0	3	41	25	+16
Israel	4	0	2	2	9	26	-17
Kyrgyzstan	3	0	0	3	6	18	-12
Liechtenstein	2	2	0	0	11	3	+8
Lithuania	1	0	0	1	0	20	-20
Mexico	4	1	0	3	7	16	-9
Mongolia	6	6	0	0	41	7	+34
New Zealand	5	0	0	5	9	32	-23
North Korea	7	1	0	6	12	29	-17
Philippines	1	1	0	0	4	2	+2
Serbia and Montenegro	1	0	0	1	0	13	-13
South Africa	12	5	0	7	34	61	-27
Spain	4	0	0	4	1	67	−66
Thailand	2	0	0	2	3	16	-13
Turkey	13	5	0	8	52	79	-27
Turkmenistan	5	2	0	3	16	23	-7
United Arab Emirates	7	5	0	2	48	19	+29
Uzbekistan	1	0	0	1	0	14	-14
Total	125	51	2	72	520	689	-169
