= Mark Morrison (ice hockey, born 1982) =

Northern Irish ice hockey player

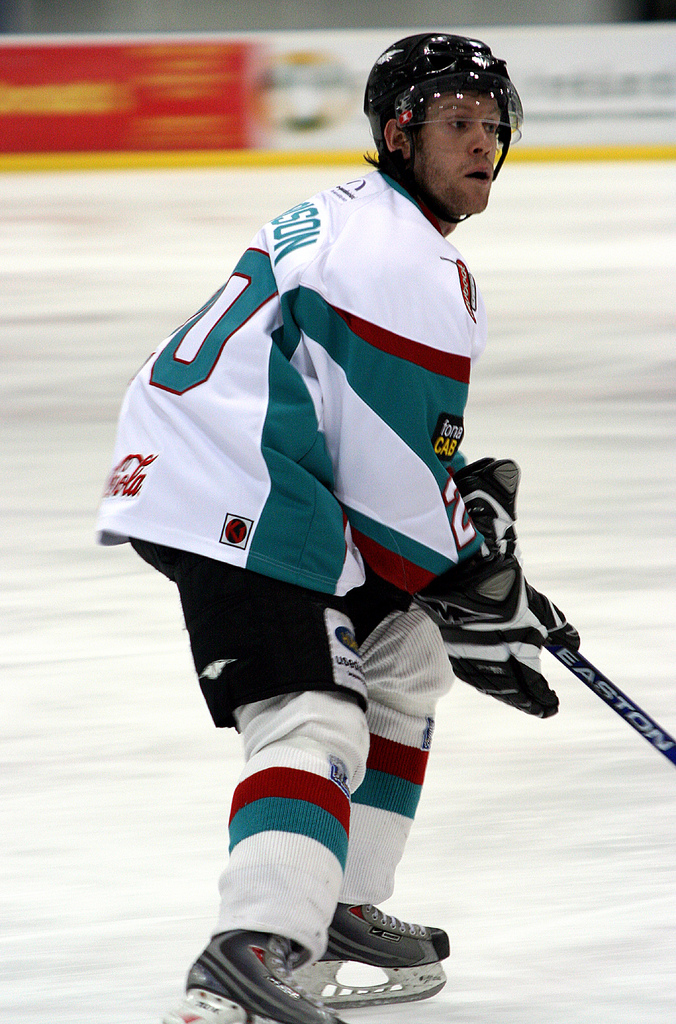
- Born: 14 June 1982 (age 43) Belfast, Northern Ireland, UK
- Height: 5 ft 5 in (165 cm)
- Weight: 185 lb (84 kg; 13 st 3 lb)
- Position: Right wing
- Shot: Right
- EIHL team: Belfast Giants
- Playing career: 2003–2010

Mark Morrison (born 14 June 1982 in Belfast) is a retired professional ice hockey forward from Northern Ireland. He spent his entire career playing for his hometown Belfast Giants.

Morrison joined the Giants in 2003. Nicknamed "The Mo Train", Morrison began his career as a defensive minded forward. Morrison also plays internationally for the Ireland national ice hockey team where he helped them win silver in the International Ice Hockey Federation World Championships Division III and gain promotion to Division II. At the end of the 2009–10 season Mark ended his career for the Giants.
