= Iceland men's national ice hockey team =

Iceland
- Nickname: Icelandic Falcons
- Association: Ice Hockey Iceland
- Head coach: Martin Struzinski
- Assistants: Robin Danielsson; Rúnar Rúnarsson
- Captain: Róbert Pálsson
- Most games: Ingvar Jónsson (103)
- Top scorer: Jónas Breki Magnússon; Robin Hedström (32)
- Most points: Emil Alengaard (91)
- Team colors
- IIHF code: ISL
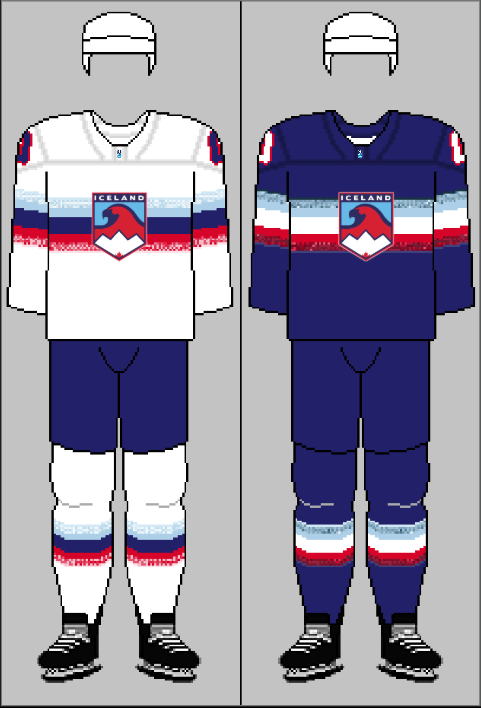

Ranking
- Current IIHF: 31 (3 June 2026)
- Highest IIHF: 32 (2018)
- Lowest IIHF: 40 (2006)

First international
- Israel 11–0 Iceland (Krugersdorp, South Africa; 14 April 1999)

Biggest win
- Iceland 30–0 Armenia (Reykjavík, Iceland; 18 March 2004)

Biggest defeat
- Lithuania 20–0 Iceland (Novi Sad, FR Yugoslavia; 28 March 2002)

IIHF World Championships
- Appearances: 20 (first in 1999)
- Best result: 30th (2014)

International record (W–L–T)
- 48–68–1

The Icelandic men's national ice hockey team (Icelandic: Íslenska karlalandsliðið í íshokkí) is a member of the International Ice Hockey Federation, representing Iceland in ice hockey competitions. Iceland is ranked 34th in the world by the IIHF World Rankings as of 2022.

== IIHF World Championships ==
Year	Host	Division/Group	Group Position	Overall Position
1999	(South Africa) Krugersdorp	Group D	8th	41st
2000	(Iceland) Reykjavík	Group D	5th	38th
2001	(Spain) Majadahonda	Division II, Group A	5th	33rd
2002	(Federal Republic of Yugoslavia) Novi Sad	Division II, Group B	4th	39th
2003	(Bulgaria) Sofia	Division II, Group B	6th (relegated)	40th
2004	(Iceland) Reykjavík	Division III	1st (promoted)	37th
2005	(Serbia and Montenegro) Belgrade	Division II, Group B	6th (relegated)	40th
2006	(Iceland) Reykjavík	Division III	1st (promoted)	41st
2007	(South Korea) Seoul	Division II, Group B	4th	38th
2008	(Australia) Newcastle	Division II, Group B	5th	39th
2009	(Serbia) Novi Sad	Division II, Group A	4th	32nd
2010	(Estonia) Narva	Division II, Group B	3rd	37th
2011	(Croatia) Zagreb	Division II, Group B	3rd	35th
2012	(Iceland) Reykjavík	Division II, Group A	4th	32nd
2013	(Croatia) Zagreb	Division II, Group A	3rd	31st
2014	(Serbia) Belgrade	Division II, Group A	2nd	30th
2015	(Iceland) Reykjavík	Division II, Group A	5th	33rd
2016	(Spain) Jaca	Division II, Group A	5th	33rd
2017	(Romania) Galați	Division II, Group A	5th	33rd
2018	(Netherlands) Tilburg	Division II, Group A	6th (relegated)	34th
2019	Mexico City	Division II, Group B	2nd	36th
2020	(Iceland) Reykjavík	Cancelled due to the COVID-19 pandemic		
2021	(Iceland) Reykjavík	Cancelled due to the COVID-19 pandemic		
2022	(Iceland) Reykjavík	Division II, Group B	1st (promoted)	32nd
2023	(Spain) Madrid	Division II, Group A	6th	34th
2024	(Serbia) Belgrade	Division II, Group A	6th (relegated)	34th
2025	(New Zealand) Dunedin	Division II, Group B	2nd	36th
2026	(Bulgaria) Sofia	Division II, Group B	3rd	37th
2027	(Kyrgyzstan) Bishkek	Division II, Group B		

== All-time record against other nations ==
As of 12 April 2026.

Team	GP	W	T	L	GF	GA
Armenia	2	2	0	0	35	4
Australia	10	4	0	6	25	30
Belgium	10	3	0	7	28	57
Bulgaria	6	3	0	3	22	22
China	8	4	0	4	33	26
Chinese Taipei	2	2	0	0	8	6
Croatia	5	0	0	5	6	37
Estonia	4	0	0	4	5	33
Georgia	4	1	0	3	9	16
Greece	1	0	0	1	6	8
Ireland	3	3	0	0	29	1
Israel	13	4	0	9	36	60
Kyrgyzstan	2	2	0	0	15	7
Lithuania	1	0	0	1	0	20
Luxembourg	2	2	0	0	13	2
Mexico	5	3	1	1	24	12
Netherlands	3	0	0	3	2	18
New Zealand	8	8	0	0	39	14
North Korea	4	3	0	1	15	11
Romania	5	1	0	4	10	25
Serbia	11	3	0	8	32	59
Serbia and Montenegro	2	0	0	2	3	19
South Africa	2	0	0	2	6	14
South Korea	2	0	0	2	2	24
Spain	11	2	0	9	27	64
Thailand	1	1	0	0	6	3
Turkey	4	4	0	0	29	7
United Arab Emirates	1	0	0	1	2	7
Total	117	48	1	68	414	541
