= 2006 IIHF World Championship Division III =

International ice hockey tournament

Tournament details
- Host country: Iceland
- Venue(s): Reykjavík
- Dates: April 24 – April 29
- Teams: 5

Final positions
- Champions: Iceland
- Runner-up: Turkey
- Third place: Armenia

Tournament statistics
- Games played: 10
- Scoring leader(s): (Turkey) Cengiz Çıplak (14 pts)

The 2006 IIHF World Championship Division III was an international ice hockey tournament run by the International Ice Hockey Federation. The tournament was contested on April 24–29, 2006 in Reykjavík, Iceland. Iceland won the championship and gained promotion, along with Turkey, into the 2007 Division II tournament.

== Participants ==
Team	2005 result
Iceland	Host, placed 6th in Division II Group B and were relegated.
Turkey	Placed 6th in Division II Group A and were relegated.
Luxembourg	Placed 3rd in Division III.
Ireland	Placed 4th in Division III.
Armenia	Placed 5th in Division III.

== Fixtures ==
All times local.

April 24, 2006; 16:00	Armenia	3–8 (0–2, 2–4, 1–2)	Turkey	Reykjavík; Attendance: 205

Game reference

Lavik Ghazaryan
Goalies
Cagil Uyar
Levent Ozbaydogan
Referee:
(Sweden) Lars–Johan Rhyed

	0 – 1	5:51 – Çıplak (SH1)
	0 – 2	11:22 – Çıplak (Coskun, Yapicilar) (PP1)
	0 – 3	21:01 – Yapicilar (Coskun, Çıplak)
	0 – 4	22:52 – Yavuzarslan (Cetinkaya,
31:48 – Balyan (Blikyan) (PP1)	1 – 4
	1 – 5	34:34 – Çıplak
	1 – 6	36:10 – Coskun (PP1)
39:06 – Ghazanchyan (Balyan, Kandakharyan)	2 – 6
	2 – 7	45:46 – Çıplak (Hamarat) (PP1)
	2 – 8	54:54 – Çıplak
59:21 – Balyan (Bubushyan, Khachatryan)	3 – 8

18 min
Penalties
26 min
34
Shots
49

April 24, 2006; 20:00	Luxembourg	2–5 (0–0, 2–2, 0–3)	Iceland	Reykjavík; Attendance: 550

Game reference

Michel Welter
Goalies
Birgir Orn Sveinsson
Referee:
(United Kingdom) Andy Carson

20:43 – Beran (PP1)	1–0
	1–1	23:16 – Ericsson (Hrafnsson)
	1–2	32:14 – Thordarsson (Magnusson, Bjorgvinsson) (SH1)
36:17 – Schons (Scheier)	2–2
	2–3	55:43 – Allengard (SH1)
	2–4	57:24 – Thormodsson (Runarsson) (SH1)
	2–5	59:31 – Thordmodsson (Hallgrimson, Jakobsson)

26 min
Penalties
20 min
17
Shots
51

April 25, 2006; 20:00	Ireland	0–6 (0–3, 0–3, 0–0)	Armenia	Reykjavík; Attendance: 239

Game reference

Kevin Kelly
Goalies
Lavik Ghazaryan
Referee:
(Belgium) Benny Haxelmans

0–1	14:01 – Ghazanchyan (Khachatryan, Kandakharyan) (PP1)
0–2	16:53 – Elmazyan (Abrahamyan)
0–3	18:12 – Kandakharyan (Blikyan, Ghazanchyan)
0–4	27:33 – Kandakharyan (Ghazanchyan) (PP2)
0–5	31:36 – Ghazanchyan (Kandakharyan) (PP1)
0–6	39:35 – Khachatryan (Ghazanchyan) (PP2)

30 min
Penalties
32 min
19
Shots
50

April 26, 2006; 16:30	Turkey	8–2 (1–0, 3–1, 4–1)	Luxembourg	Reykjavík; Attendance: 189

Game reference

Cagil Uyar
Levent Ozbaydogan
Goalies
Michel Welter
Referee:
(Belgium) Benny Haxelmans

6:30 – Çıplak (Coskun) (PP1)	1 – 0
25:00 – Çıplak (Coskun, Tasdemir)	2 – 0
26:03 – Çıplak (Tasdemir) (PP1)	3 – 0
31:59 – Coskun (SH1)	4 – 0
	4 – 1	32:20 – Beran (Scheier, Schons)
46:17 – Coskun (Öztürk, Cetinkaya)	5 – 1
51:12 – Yapicilar (Coskun, Çıplak)	6 – 1
51:54 – Çıplak (Yapicilar) (PP1)	7 – 1
55:08 – Çıplak (PP1)	8 – 1
	8 – 2	56:49 – Dessouroux (Houdremont, Scheier)

18 min
Penalties
22 min
46
Shots
16

April 26, 2006; 20:00	Iceland	8–0 (0–0, 3–0, 5–0)	Ireland	Reykjavík; Attendance: 820

Game reference

Birgir Orm Sveinsson
Goalies
Kevin Kelly
Hugh Smyth
Referee:
(Sweden) Lars–Johan Rhyed

21:23 – Runarsson (Allengard, Jonsson)	1 – 0
28:30 – Allengard (Thormodsson) (SH1)	2 – 0
39:10 – Runarsson (Vidarsson, Allengard) (PP1)	3 – 0
40:20 – Vidarsson (Allengard, Thormodsson) (PP1)	4 – 0
46:05 – Runarsson (Allengard, Jonsson) (PP1)	5 – 0
47:22 – Ericsson (Allengard, Magnusson)	6 – 0
51:43 – Thormodsson (Runarsson, Allengard) (PP1)	7 – 0
54:10 – Jonsson (Allengard, Runarsson)	8 – 0

49 min
Penalties
28 min
53
Shots
9

April 27, 2006; 20:00	Armenia	4–5 (2–0, 0–2, 2–3)	Iceland	Reykjavík; Attendance: 674

Game reference

Lavik Ghazaryan
Goalies
Birgir Orn Sveinsson
Referee:
(United Kingdom) Andy Carson

7:42 – Kandakharyan (PP1)	1 – 0
16:16 – Khachatryan (Elmazyan, Kandakharyan) (PP1)	2 – 0
	2 – 1	27:53 – Jonsson (Runarsson, Allengard) (PP2)
	2 – 2	29:43 – Ingolfsson (Allengard) (PP2)
42:48 – Balyan (Khachatryan, Kandakharyan)	3 – 2
	3 – 3	43:09 – Jonsson (Thormodsson, Allengard)
	3 – 4	51:28 – Runarsson (Thormodsson, Allengard)
	3 – 5	52:55 – Magnusson (Heimisson, Thordarsson)
58:48 – Mazmanyan (Kandakharyan, Balyan)	4 – 5

32 min
Penalties
22 min
29
Shots
44

April 28, 2006; 16:30	Luxembourg	6–10 (4–1, 1–8, 1–1)	Armenia	Reykjavík; Attendance: 297

Game reference

Philippe Lepage
Michel Welter
Goalies
Lavik Ghazaryan
Referee:
(Belgium) Benny Haxelmans

2:59 – Beran (Welter, Houdremont)	1 – 0
9:58 – Beran (Welter, Houdremont)	2 – 0
10:50 – Welter (Beran, Houdremont) (PP1)	3 – 0
	3 – 1	11:35 – Kandakharyan (Apelyan)
18:44 – Welter (Beran)	4 – 1
21:09 – Beran (Welter) (SH1)	5 – 1
	5 – 2	21:54 – Balyan (Mazmanyan) (SH1)
	5 – 3	26:42 – Apelyan (Khachatryan, Kandakharyan) (PP1)
	5 – 4	30:05 – Balyan (Blikyan)
	5 – 5	31:00 – Balyan
	5 – 6	31:30 – Kandakharyan (Parsamyan)
	5 – 7	37:34 – Kandakharyan (Blikyan) (PP1)
	5 – 8	37:42 – Balyan (Blikyan)
	5 – 9	38:42 – Kandakharyan (Khachatryan, Khachatryan)
	5 – 10	54:24 – Blikyan (Khachatryan)
58:07 – Welter (Beran)	6 – 10

18 min
Penalties
22 min
30
Shots
34

April 28, 2006; 20:00	Turkey	2–2 (1–0, 0–1, 1–1)	Ireland	Reykjavík; Attendance: 356

Game reference

Cagil Uyar
Goalies
Kevin Kelly
Referee:
(United Kingdom) Andy Carson

6:33 – Çıplak (Coskun)	1 – 0
	1 – 1	29:17 – Mc Caul Coxner (Morrison, Mac Neill) (PP1)
	1 – 2	41:55 – Kitchen (Lecky) (PP2)
57:38 – Yapicilar (Çıplak) (PP1)	2 – 2

26 min
Penalties
26 min
28
Shots
14

April 29, 2006; 16:30	Ireland	3–1 (2–0, 0–1, 1–0)	Luxembourg	Reykjavík; Attendance: 179

Game reference

Kevin Kelly
Goalies
Michel Welter
Referee:
(Belgium) Benny Haxelmans

3:36 – Mc Carter (Hamill, Mac Neill) (PP1)	1 – 0
9:59 – Mac Neill (Morrison) (PP1)	2 – 0
	2 – 1	38:41 – Houdremont (Scheier)
52:08 – Mc Caul Coxner (Keaney, Mac Neill) (PP1)	3 – 1

20 min
Penalties
20 min
40
Shots
16

April 29, 2006; 20:00	Iceland	9–0 (1–0, 6–0, 2–0)	Turkey	Reykjavík; Attendance: 978

Game reference

Birgir Orn Sveinsson
Gunnlauger Bjornsson
Goalies
Cagil Uyar
Levent Ozbaydogan
Referee:
(Sweden) Lars-Johan Rhyed

15:39 – Magnusson (Heimisson)	1 – 0
23:34 – Thordarsson (Magnusson, Bjorgvinsson) (PP1)	2 – 0
25:39 – Magnusson (PS)	3 – 0
31:28 – Hallgrimson (Ericsson)	4 – 0
33:11 – Thordarsson	5 – 0
33:42 – Hrafnsson (Ericsson)	6 – 0
38:28 – Hallgrimson (Thormodsson)	7 – 0
51:37 – Andresson (Vidarsson) (PP1)	8 – 0
53:05 – Jonsson (Ericsson)	9 – 0

47 min
Penalties
99 min
32
Shots
21

== Ranking and statistics ==
Pos	Team	Pld	W	D	L	GF	GA	GD	Pts	Promotion
1	Iceland	4	4	0	0	27	6	+21	8	Promoted to Division II for 2007
2	Turkey	4	2	1	1	18	16	+2	5	Promoted to Division II for 2007
3	Armenia	4	2	0	2	23	19	+4	4	
4	Ireland	4	1	1	2	5	17	−12	3	
5	Luxembourg	4	0	0	4	11	26	−15	0	

=== Scoring leaders ===
List shows the top skaters sorted by points, then goals. If the list exceeds 10 skaters because of a tie in points, all of the tied skaters are left out.

Player	GP	G	A	Pts	+/−	PIM	POS
(Turkey) Cengiz Çıplak	4	11	3	14	+5	47	F
(Armenia) Gevork Kandakharyan	4	7	7	14	+3	0	F
(Iceland) Emil Allengard	4	2	11	13	+6	35	F
(Armenia) Manuk Balyan	4	7	2	9	+1	2	F
(Turkey) Erdogan Coskun	4	3	6	9	+3	2	F
(Luxembourg) Robert Beran	4	5	3	8	0	6	F
(Iceland) Runar Freyr Runarsson	4	4	4	8	+5	0	F
(Iceland) Gauti Thormodsson	4	3	5	8	+6	4	F

GP = Games played; G = Goals; A = Assists; Pts = Points; +/− = Plus/minus; PIM = Penalties in minutes; POS = Position
Source: IIHF.com

=== Leading goaltenders ===
Only the top five goaltenders, based on save percentage, who have played 40% of their team's minutes are included in this list.

Player	TOI	SA	GA	GAA	Sv%	SO
(Iceland) Birgir Orn Sveinsson	220:00	69	6	1.64	91.30	2
(Republic of Ireland) Kevin Kelly	229:54	138	15	3.91	89.13	0
(Armenia) Lavik Ghazaryan	240:00	142	19	4.75	86.62	1
(Luxembourg) Michel Welter	209:00	150	21	6.03	86.00	0
(Turkey) Çağıl Uyar	186:24	63	9	2.90	85.71	0

TOI = Time On Ice (minutes:seconds); SA = Shots against; GA = Goals against; GAA = Goals against average; Sv% = Save percentage; SO = Shutouts
Source: IIHF.com
