= Ireland men's national ice hockey team =

Ireland
- Nickname: The Boys in Green
- Association: Irish Ice Hockey Association
- Manager: Aeidamar Sally
- Head coach: Aaron Guli
- Assistants: Paul Cummins; Aaron Collins
- Captain: Declan Weir
- Most games: Robert Leckey (43)
- Top scorer: Gareth Roberts (27)
- Most points: Gareth Roberts (47)
- Team colors
- IIHF code: IRL

Ranking
- Current IIHF: NR (3 June 2026)
- Highest IIHF: 40 (2008)
- Lowest IIHF: 48 (2015–16)

First international
- Mexico 8–3 Ireland (Reykjavík, Iceland; 16 March 2004)

Biggest win
- Ireland 23–1 Armenia (Mexico City, Mexico; 8 March 2005)

Biggest defeat
- Romania 22–0 Ireland (Zagreb, Croatia; 13 April 2011)

IIHF World Championships
- Appearances: 10 (first in 2004)
- Best result: 40th (2008)

Development Cup
- Appearances: 4 (first in 2017)
- Best result: 1st (2024)

International record (W–L–T)
- 27–39–3

Medal record

Division III
Gold medal – first place	2010 Luxembourg (Group A)	
Silver medal – second place	2007 Ireland	

Development Cup
Gold medal – first place	2024 Bratislava	
Silver medal – second place	2017 Canillo	
Bronze medal – third place	2018 Füssen	
Bronze medal – third place	2022 Füssen	

The Ireland national ice hockey team (Irish: Foireann haca oighir náisiúnta na hÉireann) is the national men's ice hockey team of the Republic of Ireland run by the Irish Ice Hockey Association (IIHA) and a member of the International Ice Hockey Federation (IIHF) since 26 September 1996.

The Republic of Ireland gained promotion to Division II of the IIHF World Championships in 2007, but after a worst performance in their Division II debut, they were then relegated back to Division III. The team is unable to participate in IIHF tournaments since placing 4th with six points in 2013. With the closure of the Dundalk Ice Dome, they can no longer meet their minimum participation standards. In 2017, the team returned at international competition after a four-year absence, and played at the inaugural Development Cup in Canillo, Andorra. They finished as the runners-up after falling 11–4 to Morocco.

The team has had members from both Northern Ireland and the Republic of Ireland and has a working relationship with the Belfast Giants of the Elite Ice Hockey League (EIHL) and new Irish clubs, Flyers Ice Hockey Club and Dundalk Bulls.

== History ==
The Republic of Ireland was accepted into the IIHF in May 1996 after a nomination by Great Britain and a second by Canada. They have not had a long history of international competition, with the Irish national team first competing in 2004. They have not competed at a world championship since.

== IIHF World Ranking ==
As of 30 May 2022, Ireland is currently not ranked in the IIHF World Ranking.

== International competition ==
=== 2004 IIHF World Championship Division III; Reykjavík, Iceland ===
Game 1. Ireland 3 – Mexico 8
Game 2. Armenia 1 – Ireland 15
Game 3. Ireland 1 – Iceland 7
Game 4. Turkey 7 – Ireland 4
Final result: fourth place, one win, and three losses for 2 points, 23 goals for, 23 goals against

=== 2005 IIHF World Championship Division III; Mexico City, Mexico ===
Game 1. Ireland 23 – Armenia 1
Game 2. Luxembourg 8 – Ireland 4
Game 3. Ireland 4 – South Africa 5
Game 4. Mexico 6 – Ireland 1
Final result: fourth place, one win, and three losses for 2 points, 32 goals for, 20 goals against

=== 2006 IIHF World Championship Division III; Reykjavík, Iceland ===
Game 1. Ireland 0 – Armenia 6
Game 2. Iceland 8 – Ireland 0
Game 3. Turkey 2 – Ireland 2
Game 4. Ireland 3 – Luxembourg 1
Final result: fourth place, one win, two losses, and one tie for 3 points, 5 goals for, 17 goals against

=== 2007 IIHF World Championship Division III; Dundalk, Ireland ===
Game 1. Ireland 11 – Mongolia 0
Game 2. Ireland 2 – New Zealand 4
Game 3. Ireland 3 – South Africa 1
Game 4. Ireland 4 – Luxembourg 3 (OT)
Final result: second place, two wins, one overtime win, and one loss for 8 points, 20 goals for, 8 goals against [Team Ireland is Promoted to Division II of the 2008 IIHF World Championships]

=== 2008 IIHF World Championship Division II Group B; Miercurea Ciuc, Romania ===
Game 1. Ireland 1 – Serbia 13
Game 2. Ireland 4 – Bulgaria 7
Game 3. Ireland 1 – Belgium 9
Game 4. Ireland 1 – Romania 21
Game 5. Ireland 1 – Israel 7
Final result: last place, five losses for 0 points, 8 goals for, 57 goals against [Team Ireland is relegated to the 2009 IIHF World Championship Div III]

=== 2009 IIHF World Championship Division III; Dunedin, New Zealand ===
Game 1. Ireland 3 – Greece 7
Game 2. Ireland 3 – Luxembourg 8
Game 3. Ireland 5 – Mongolia 0 (Forfeit)
Game 4. Ireland 1 – Turkey 7
Game 5. Ireland 0 – New Zealand 9
Final result: fifth place, one win, and four losses for 3 points, 12 goals for, 31 goals against

=== 2010 IIHF World Championship Division III Group A; Kockelscheuer, Luxembourg ===
Game 1. Ireland 6 – Luxembourg 4
Game 2. Greece 1 – Ireland 3
Game 3. United Arab Emirates – 2 Ireland 8
Final result: first place, three wins for 9 points, 17 goals for, 7 goals against [Team Ireland is Promoted to Division II of the 2011 IIHF World Championships]

=== 2011 IIHF World Championship Division II Group B; Zagreb, Croatia ===
Game 1. Ireland 0 – Bulgaria 6
Game 2. China 5 – Ireland 0
Game 3. Romania 22 – Ireland 0
Game 4. Ireland 4 – Croatia 21
Game 5. Iceland 14 – Ireland 0
Final result: last place, five losses for 0 points, 4 goals for, 68 goals against [Team Ireland is relegated to the 2012 IIHF World Championship Div III]

=== 2012 IIHF World Championship Division III; Erzurum, Turkey ===
Game 1. Luxembourg 7 – Ireland 2
Game 2. Ireland 5 – Greece 3
Game 3. Ireland 3 – Turkey 5
Game 4. Ireland 8 – Mongolia 4
Game 5. North Korea 5 – Ireland 0
Final result: fourth place, two wins, three losses for 6 points, 18 goals for, 24 goals against

=== 2013 IIHF World Championship Division III; Cape Town, South Africa ===
Game 1. Greece 3 – Ireland 6
Game 2. South Africa 7 – Ireland 4
Game 3. Luxembourg 5 – Ireland 0
Game 4. Ireland 1 – North Korea 2
Game 5. Ireland 7 – United Arab Emirates 3
Final result: fourth place, two wins, three losses for 6 points, 18 goals for, 20 goals against

== Personnel ==
- Aaron Guli – Head Coach
- Paul Cummins - Assistant Coach
- Aaron Collins - Assistant Coach
- Greg Ireland - Assistant Coach
- Aeidamar Sally - General Manager

== Current roster ==
Roster for the 2023-24 Development Cup

Head coach: Aaron Guli

No.	Pos.	Name	Height	Weight	Birthdate	Team
1	G	Jack O'Dea	1.77 m (5 ft 10 in)	73 kg (161 lb)	2001 (age 23/24)	(United States) Blue Ridge Bobcats, FPHL
2	F	Darragh Bond			19 October 1998 (age 28)	(Netherlands) Icehawks Eindhoven, Netherlands4
3	D	Greg Munday				Without Club
8	D	Raimonds Karpinskis	1.72 m (5 ft 8 in)	70 kg (154 lb)	30 December 1982 (age 43)	Without Club
9	D	Greg Zaffino	1.97 m (6 ft 6 in)	95 kg (209 lb)	7 August 1994 (age 32)	Williams College, NCAA III
10	D	Tarin McNamara	1.83 m (6 ft 0 in)	82 kg (181 lb)	4 August 1999 (age 27)	Without Club
15	D	Thomas Carpenter - A	1.90 m (6 ft 3 in)	82 kg (181 lb)	19 February 2000 (age 26)	(Switzerland) HC Prilly Black Panthers, SwissDiv1
17	F	Adam Robinson - A	1.80 m (5 ft 11 in)	83 kg (183 lb)	27 September 1996 (age 30)	(Scotland) Edinburgh Capitals, SNL
18	F	Ronan Weir	1.75 m (5 ft 9 in)	68 kg (150 lb)	5 February 1996 (age 30)	Without Club
19	F	David Sally	1.80 m (5 ft 11 in)	78 kg (172 lb)	9 December 1999 (age 26)	Without Club
20	F	Nolan Regan	1.82 m (6 ft 0 in)	82 kg (181 lb)	9 September 1997 (age 29)	(Lithuania) Hockey Punks, Latvia
22	F	Sam Owen			2004 (age 20/21)	(Scotland) Kilmarnock Thunder, SNL
23	F	Aidan Connolly	1.80 m (5 ft 11 in)	77 kg (170 lb)	10 May 2001 (age 25)	(United States) Salve Regina University, NCAA III
24	F	Declan Weir - C	1.79 m (5 ft 10 in)	75 kg (165 lb)	10 September 1993 (age 33)	(United States) Alpena 45ers, MIHL
28	F	Jamie Ferguson	1.77 m (5 ft 10 in)	70 kg (154 lb)	31 May 2002 (age 24)	(Scotland) Kilmarnock Thunder, SNL
35	G	Andrew Dickson	1.83 m (6 ft 0 in)	82 kg (181 lb)	2 November 1987 (age 39)	(Northern Ireland) Belfast Giants, EIHL
39	F	Nolan Sheeran	1.80 m (5 ft 11 in)	91 kg (201 lb)	2 April 1994 (age 32)	(Canada) Dundas Real McCoys, ACH
54	D	Sean O'Neill			18 August 2000 (age 26)	(England) Solihull Barons, NIHL 1
55	F	Harvey Wooldridge	1.85 m (6 ft 1 in)	80 kg (176 lb)	2 October 2006 (age 20)	(United States) Connecticut RoughRiders, EHL
72	F	Alec Young	1.88 m (6 ft 2 in)	84 kg (185 lb)	30 December 2003 (age 22)	Without Club
89	D	Zac Cummins			19 July 2001 (age 25)	Without Club
91	F	Andrew Stefura	1.85 m (6 ft 1 in)	82 kg (181 lb)	22 July 2000 (age 26)	(United States) Castleton University, NCAA III

== All-time record against other nations ==
Last match: 27 April 2024

Team	GP	W	T	L	GF	GA
Algeria	1	1	0	0	7	6
Andorra	4	3	1	0	25	20
Argentina	2	1	0	1	13	15
Armenia	3	2	0	1	38	8
Belgium	1	0	0	1	1	9
Brazil	1	1	0	0	16	0
Bulgaria	2	0	0	2	4	13
China	1	0	0	1	0	5
Colombia	3	1	1	1	16	10
Croatia	1	0	0	1	4	21
Greece	5	4	0	1	29	17
Iceland	3	0	0	3	1	29
Israel	1	0	0	1	1	7
Liechtenstein	2	0	0	2	11	13
Luxembourg	8	3	0	5	25	41
Mexico	2	0	0	2	4	14
Mongolia	3	3	0	0	24	4
Morocco	2	0	0	2	6	21
North Macedonia	1	0	0	1	6	9
New Zealand	2	0	0	2	2	13
North Korea	2	0	0	2	1	7
Portugal	7	5	0	2	49	35
Romania	2	0	0	2	1	43
Serbia	1	0	0	1	1	13
South Africa	3	1	0	2	11	13
Turkey	4	0	1	3	10	21
United Arab Emirates	2	2	0	0	15	5
Total	69	27	3	39	322	412
