= 1997–98 Luxembourg Cup (ice hockey) =

The 1997–98 Luxembourg Cup was the fifth playing of the Luxembourg Cup ice hockey tournament. Five teams participated in the tournament, which was won by the Chiefs Leuven.

== First round ==
	Club
1.	(Belgium) Chiefs Leuven
2.	Tornado Luxembourg
3.	(Germany) ESV Bitburg
4.	(Germany) EHC Trier
5.	(France) HC Metz

== Final ==
- Chiefs Leuven - Tornado Luxembourg 8:5
