= Monique Scheier-Schneider =

Luxembourgish ice hockey administrator (born 1954)

- Born: 15 October 1954 (age 71); Schifflange, Luxembourg
- Occupation: Ice hockey administrator
- Known for: International Ice Hockey Federation council member; Luxembourg Ice Hockey Federation secretary; Tornado Luxembourg team president
- Awards: Paul Loicq Award (2015)

Monique Scheier-Schneider (born 15 October 1954) is a Luxembourgish ice hockey administrator. She has served as president of Tornado Luxembourg and negotiated the team's entry into the French Division 3. She became secretary of the Luxembourg Ice Hockey Federation, managing the Luxembourg men's national ice hockey team at international competitions. She was later elected to the International Ice Hockey Federation (IIHF) council, oversaw the 2010 Winter Olympics Women's ice hockey tournament, and presided over the 2011 IIHF Women's World Championship. She was honored by the IIHF with the Paul Loicq Award in 2015 for her contributions to international ice hockey.

== Early life ==
Schneider was born on 15 October 1954, and is a native of Schifflange, Luxembourg. She first became involved in ice hockey as a volunteer scorekeeper in 1974, remaining in the game since.

== Luxembourg club ice hockey ==
Schneider has served as the team president of Tornado Luxembourg since 2001. Schneider has operated the Tornado as an amateur team which does not pay its players, and covers its costs by a sponsorship from Škoda Auto. When her tenure as president began, the team played in the fourth German division. When rinks in the Rhineland region closed and the level of play declined, she looked for an alternate solution as opposed to traveling further into Germany for games.

Looking for a change, Schneider contacted Luc Tardif, the head of ice hockey at the French Federation of Ice Sports. In 2005, Schneider negotiated permission for Tornado to play in the French Division 3. As part of the agreement, the team is eligible for promotion to the top Ligue Magnus tier, but cannot become the French champion and represent France at international competitions for club teams. Schneider commented on the agreement by saying, "I think it's fair since we are already Luxembourg's champion by regularly beating our only competitor, the Beaufort club".

Since transferring to the French Division 3, Schneider has arranged exhibition games for Tornado in Germany, traveling with them to "Traditional Night" for the Kölner Haie in Cologne.

== Luxembourg national ice hockey ==
Schneider has served as the general secretary of the Luxembourg Ice Hockey Federation since 1992. Her tasks have included being an off-ice official for games, and building up minor ice hockey programs in her country. She has participated in congress meetings of the International Ice Hockey Federation (IIHF) as the representative from Luxembourg.

Schneider also served as the manager of the Luxembourg men's national under-18 team, and the Luxembourg men's national junior team, in addition to the Luxembourg men's national team. During her tenure, the men's national team won a bronze medal at both the 2005 IIHF World Championship Division III and 2007 IIHF World Championship Division III events. Her Tornado team has supplied many of the players on the national team, and she has stated that "our goal is to continue the history of hockey in Luxembourg and to pass on our passion for this sport to future generations".

In 2022, Schneider served as the manager of the Luxembourg women's national team which won a bronze medal at the IIHF Women's Development Cup held in Kuwait City.

== International ice hockey ==
In 2008, Schneider became only the third female elected to the IIHF board of directors. She served as a director from 2008 to 2012, and sat on the IIHF's competition and in-line hockey committee. Her duties included supervising the 2010 Winter Olympics Women's ice hockey tournament, and presiding over the 2011 IIHF Women's World Championship. At these events she enforced IIHF regulations, investigated complaints from participating teams, ensured proper advertising procedures, and oversaw the medal presentation and flag-raising ceremonies. She also helped revise and expand game regulations for the Ice Hockey World Championships.

The IIHF honored Schneider with the Paul Loicq Award in 2015, for her contributions to international ice hockey. She formally received the award during the 2015 Men's World Ice Hockey Championships in Prague. She was surprised to be given the award, considering that she represented a nation in the third division of IIHF competition. She stated that, "You can't ask for more than receiving an award for something you're doing with love and passion. I hope I can still go on some more time because hockey is my life". In 2014, Schneider announced plans to retire from hockey in 2016, stating that she was "proud to have seen hockey in Luxembourg go a long way". She later withdrew as a candidate from the elections for the 2016 IIHF council.

== Personal life ==
Schneider worked as an executive secretary at ARBED, then worked in the family's mechanical workshop. She was introduced to hockey in the late 1960s by her husband, Nico Scheier, who was a goaltender for a team in Beaufort, Luxembourg. Their two sons began playing hockey at ages four and five, and the oldest son Ronny, served as team captain of the Tornado. Her sons and three of her nephews played on the Luxembourg national ice hockey team. Schneider's brother Alain has served as the president of the Luxembourg Hockey Federation.
