= 1998–99 Luxembourg Cup (ice hockey) =

Luxembourg Cup ice hockey tournament

The 1998–99 Luxembourg Cup was the sixth playing of the Luxembourg Cup ice hockey tournament. Seven teams participated in the tournament, which was won by Tornado Luxembourg.

== Final standings ==
	Club	GP	W	T	L	GF–GA	Pts
1.	Tornado Luxembourg	12	11	0	1	214:47	22
2.	(Germany) ESV Bitburg	12	8	0	4	111:61	16
3.	Lokomotive Luxembourg	12	7	1	4	81:64	15
4.	(Germany) EHC Trier	12	6	1	5	89:70	13
5.	(France) Galaxians d'Amnéville	12	6	0	6	85:91	12
6.	(Luxembourg) IHC Beaufort	12	3	0	9	38:131	6
7.	(Luxembourg) Rapids Remich	12	0	0	12	25:179	0
