= Creos Luxembourg =

Energy corporation

Creos Luxembourg S.A.
- Industry: Energy
- Founded: 2009
- Headquarters: Rue de Strassen, 105; L-2555 Luxembourg
- Area served: Luxembourg
- Key people: Laurence Zenner (CEO); Carole Brückler (President)
- Products: Electricity and natural gas
- Revenue: (406.6 million € as at 31 December 2024)
- Owner: 1. Encevo S.A. (75.43%); 2. City of Luxembourg (20%); 3. State of the Grand Duchy of Luxembourg (2.28%); 4. 41 Luxembourg municipal authorities (2.08%); 5. Fédération du Génie Technique (0.10%); 6. Creos Luxembourg S.A. (0.10%)
- Number of employees: 911 (as at 31 December 2024)
- Parent: Encevo Group
- Website: creos-net.lu

Creos Luxembourg S.A. owns and manages electricity networks and natural gas pipelines in the Grand Duchy of Luxembourg. In this capacity, the company plans, constructs and maintains high, medium and low-voltage electricity networks and high, medium and low-pressure natural gas pipelines, which it owns or which it is responsible for managing.

== History ==
Creos was formed as a result of a merger between Cegedel S.A. – the Grand-Ducal electricity company of Luxembourg, which was founded in 1928 and at the time distributed 70% of the country's required electricity supply, Soteg S.A. – Luxembourg's primary gas supplier, and Saar Ferngas AG – a distribution company created in 1929 in Saarland. On 23 January 2009, all the shares from Cegedel S.A. and Saar Ferngas AG were transferred to Soteg S.A., which – after successfully launching a mandatory public bid for all shares not yet in its possession – underwent extensive restructuring with retrospective effect on 1 January 2009, giving rise to a new energy group. Named Enovos, it included the parent company Enovos International S.A. as well as two main subsidiaries: Creos Luxembourg (formerly Cegedel S.A.) in charge of network activities, and Enovos Luxembourg S.A. in charge of production, sales and marketing. Enovos and Creos each have a subsidiary to serve the German market: Enovos Deutschland and Creos Deutschland.

Over the next two years, Creos consolidated its position on the Luxembourg market. In 2010, it expanded its gas transmission network to include a distribution network and it purchased the natural gas networks from Luxgaz Distribution S.A., whereby the management of commercial activities was handed over to Enovos Luxembourg S.A. On 1 January 2011, the City of Luxembourg transferred its electricity and natural gas networks as well as its teams to Creos in exchange for a shareholding stake. The publicly owned shareholding thus rose from 5.71% to 24.57%.

In order to more clearly distinguish the parent company from its subsidiaries – energy provider Enovos and grid operator Creos – Enovos International was given a new visual identity in 2016 and is now called Encevo. End July, private equity firm Ardian sold its stake up to 24.92 percent in Encevo to China Southern Power Grid International, the second grid operator in China and in the world.

Following a reorganization of the Encevo Group in Germany at the end of October 2021, Creos Luxembourg sold its stake in Creos Deutschland Holding GmbH. On 1 July 2023, Laurence Zenner, previously head of CFL Cargo, became the new CEO of Creos Luxembourg.

Creos has a shareholding in the following companies:

1. Luxmetering, an Economic Interest Group which pilots the smart metering network;
2. Balansys, a joint-venture between Creos and Fluxys Belgium which aims to facilitate the integration of the Belgian and Luxembourg natural H gas market sectors into a single zone;
3. Ampacimon, the world leader in electricity grid monitoring;
4. TSCNet, a European company which provides coordination and support services to 16 transmission system operators (TSOs) to ensure the efficient and secure operation of electricity grids in Europe;
5. JAO, a trading platform that hosts Europe’s leading cross-border trading system, e-CAT, and provides a full range of services from auctions for long- and short-term capacity rights to back-up auctions for day-ahead coupling.

== Business sector ==
Creos Luxembourg S.A. plans, constructs and maintains the electricity and natural gas transmission and distribution networks in the Grand Duchy of Luxembourg. Creos installs and manages the meters, processes the customer consumption data, invoices the network access charges and monitors the suppliers' movements and changes.

In Luxembourg, following the liberalisation of the energy markets, an independent organisation – the Luxembourg Institute of Regulation (ILR) – organises and supervises access to the networks. The tariffs are subject to its approval and it monitors the tolls invoiced to the users. The energy suppliers are thus guaranteed transparent access to Creos's networks.

== Infrastructure ==
=== Electricity network ===
The majority of the electric current in the Grand Duchy of Luxembourg comes from Germany via two double high-voltage 220,000 volt (220 kV) lines that are connected to the German network. The interconnection with the Belgian electricity market has become operational with the commissioning of a phase shifting transformer (PST) at the Schifflange Centre in October 2017, and around 15% of the energy fed into the network is produced locally (biogas, cogeneration, wind turbines, hydroelectricity and photovoltaics) The electricity is transmitted to the six transformer stations (Flebour, Roost, Itzig/Blooren, Heisdorf, Bertange and Schifflange) where the voltage is reduced from 220 to 65 kV before being distributed to industries and large municipal distribution networks. The voltage is then reduced from 65 kV to 20 kV in more than 60 transformer stations distributed across the whole country.

The total length of the Luxembourg electricity network managed by Creos is 12,595.9 kilometres, including 982.4 kilometres of high-voltage lines, 3,561.7 kilometres of medium-tension lines and 8,051.8 kilometres of low tension lines.

Electricity		2024
Electricity flow	GWh	4,918.32
Electricity network peak	MW	815.0
Length of network	km	12,595.92

=== Natural gas network ===
Thanks to its entry points with Germany, Belgium and France, Luxembourg is linked to the interconnected gas networks throughout Europe. Monitored by Dispatching Gas, the high and medium-pressure pipelines carry the gas to sixty or so communes that are connected to the national gas network. Pressure-reducing stations that supply the local networks then reduce the gas pressure. Creos ensures the distribution of natural gas in 45 communes.

Natural gas		2024
Total capacity of gas network	Nm^{3}/h	319,000
Gas network peak	Nm^{3}/h	181,884
Volume transported	GWh	6,698
Length of network	km	2,211.6

Since 1 October 2015, Creos and its Belgian counterpart Fluxys Belgium, in collaboration with their respective regulators ILR and CREG, have merged the two national markets into one single Belux market. This integration, the first of its kind between two European Union member states, reflects the willingness of the European Union to create a borderless European gas market^{,}^{,}^{,}. Balansys, the joint venture between Creos and its Belgian counterpart Fluxys, is the balancing operator in the Belux zone from 1 June 2020. In other words, it is responsible for ensuring that the gas market is well supplied, without one of the two suppliers having to pay an entry fee for its gas on the other's market.

=== Sites ===
The Roost Centre manages the central and northern regions. It covers the high, medium and low-voltage electricity services and the medium and low-pressure natural gas services, the central store and both the mechanical and electrical workshops^{,}.

The Schifflange Centre covers the southern part of the country.

The Luxembourg City Centre, together with the company’s headquarters, is located in Merl.

The Contern Centre manages and adjusts the meters, in particular smart meters.

Dispatching for electricity and natural gas together with the monitoring rooms for remote network control and management are installed at the Creos site in Bettembourg.

== Smart grids and energy management ==
In accordance with the law of 7 August 2012, which transposes the European Energy Efficiency Directive into Luxembourg legislation, all the gas and electricity meters across the country have been replaced, regardless of the network operator. Creos has installed throughout the Grand-Duchy of Luxembourg 300,000 smart meters that record detailed information on the consumption and production of energy. The electricity and gas meters — known as Smarty — contribute to the development of truly intelligent networks, or smart gridsg^{,}^{,}^{,}^{,}.

Creos contributed to the national e-mobility objective by installing the public charging stations known as Chargy throughout the country. This network was complemented by the SuperChargy network of ultra-fast direct current (DC) charging stations.[33] In 2025, the Minister of the Economy, SMEs, Energy and Tourism, Lex Delles (DP), signed the decree officially granting a seven-year concession for the operation of both the Chargy and SuperChargy networks to a private consortium, charge@lux.

Creos is actively participating the Third Industrial Revolution of the country. This convergence of IT, renewable energy and means of transport will have an impact on how the power grids are managed. To anticipate this evolution, Creos is involved in several large-scale national projects.

The Leneda platform (Luxembourg Energy Data Platform), launched in 2025, centralises data on electricity and gas consumption and production, making them accessible to the various market players and simplifying communication between them.

KOPR, developed by DataThings — a spin-off of the University of Luxembourg — is a digital twin of the Creos networks. It enables real-time analysis of network use and load, thereby optimising operational efficiency and resilience.

The FlexBeAn project, carried out jointly with the Luxembourg Institute of Science and Technology (LIST) and the Interdisciplinary Centre for Security, Reliability and Trust (SnT) of the University of Luxembourg, focuses on studying energy flexibility and user behaviour in response to new energy uses.

In parallel, Creos took a decisive step into the hydrogen era by creating the subsidiary Creos Luxembourg Hydrogen S.A. in 2024. This wholly owned company focuses on planning hydrogen pipelines in Luxembourg and internationally, in order to meet new European and national regulatory requirements and to support, among other initiatives, the HY4Link project. The HY4Link project, in which Creos Luxembourg participates, aims to establish a cross-border hydrogen transport network within the “Greater Region” (Belgium, Luxembourg, France, Germany), connecting industries to hydrogen import hubs (Antwerp, Zeebrugge, Rotterdam, Dunkirk) and integrating into the European hydrogen backbone.
