= 1999–2000 Luxembourg Championship season =

The 1999-00 Luxembourg Championship season was the fourth season of Luxembourg's hockey league. Three teams participated in the league regular season. The top team from the regular season, Lokomotiv Luxembourg, qualified for the final to play Tornado Luxembourg.

== Regular season ==
	Club	GP	W	L	T	GF–GA	Pts
1.	Lokomotiv Luxembourg	4	3	1	0	32:18	6
2.	IHC Beaufort	4	3	1	0	26:26	6
3.	Rapids Remich	4	0	4	0	18:32	0

== Final ==
- Tornado Luxembourg 10 - Lokomotiv Luxembourg 7
