= 2002–03 Luxembourg Championship season =

The 2002-03 Luxembourg Championship season was the seventh season of Luxembourg's hockey league. Only two teams, Tornado Luxembourg and Rapids Remich, participated in the league this season. Tornado Luxembourg won the championship. The championship has not been held since this season.

== Final ranking ==
	Club
1.	Tornado Luxembourg
2.	Rapids Remich
