= 1993–94 Luxembourg Cup (ice hockey) =

The 1993–94 Luxembourg Cup was the first playing of the Luxembourg Cup ice hockey tournament. Four teams participated in the tournament, which was won by Tornado Luxembourg.

== Final standings ==
	Club	GP	W	T	L	GF–GA	Pts
1.	Tornado Luxembourg	6	6	0	0	81:18	12
2.	(Germany) EHC Trier 1b	6	3	0	3	32:51	6
3.	(Luxembourg) IHC Beaufort	6	2	0	4	23:51	4
4.	(Netherlands) IHC Maastricht	6	1	0	5	18:34	2
