= 1998–99 Luxembourg Championship season =

The 1998-99 Luxembourg Championship season was the third season of Luxembourg's hockey league. Four teams participated in the league, and Tornado Luxembourg won the championship.

== Regular season ==
	Club	Pts
1.	Tornado Luxembourg	12
2.	Lokomotiv Luxembourg	8
3.	IHC Beaufort	4
4.	Rapids Remich	0
