= 2010–11 Luxembourg Cup (ice hockey) =

The 2010–11 ice hockey tournament, called the Luxembourg Cup, was the 12th occurrence of the cup. Four teams participated in the tournament, which was won by Lokomotive Luxembourg.

== Regular season ==
| | Club | GP | W | SOW | SOL | L | GF–GA | Pts |
|---|---|---|---|---|---|---|---|---|
| 1. | Tornado Luxembourg | 6 | 4 | 1 | 0 | 1 | 51:18 | 14 |
| 2. | Lokomotive Luxembourg | 6 | 4 | 0 | 1 | 1 | 46:14 | 13 |
| 3. | Puckers Luxembourg | 6 | 2 | 0 | 0 | 4 | 16:42 | 6 |
| 4. | IHC Beaufort | 6 | 1 | 0 | 0 | 5 | 11:39 | 3 |

== Playoffs ==
=== 3rd place ===
- IHC Beaufort - Puckers Luxembourg 8:2

=== Final ===
- Lokomotive Luxembourg - Tornado Luxembourg 5:2
