= 2006–07 Luxembourg Cup (ice hockey) =

Ice Hockey Tournament

The 2006–07 Luxembourg Cup was the 11th playing of the Luxembourg Cup ice hockey tournament. Four teams participated in the tournament, which was won by Tornado Luxembourg.

== Final standings ==
	Club	GP	W	T	L	GF–GA	Pts
1.	Tornado Luxembourg	3	3	0	0	35:7	6
2.	Puckers Luxembourg	3	2	0	1	13:17	4
3.	Huskies Luxembourg	3	1	0	2	25:16	2
4.	IHC Beaufort	3	0	0	3	5:38	0
