= 1993–94 Luxembourg Championship season =

The 1993-94 Luxembourg Championship season was the first season of Luxembourg's national hockey league championship. Tornado Luxembourg won the league title by defeating IHC Beaufort in the final.

== Final ==
(2 games total goals)

- Tornado Luxembourg - IHC Beaufort 30-5
