= 2000–01 Luxembourg Championship season =

Hockey season

The 2000-01 Luxembourg Championship season was the fifth season of Luxembourg's hockey league. Three teams participated in the league, and Tornado Luxembourg won the championship.

== Regular season ==
	Club
1.	Tornado Luxembourg
2.	Rapids Remich
3.	IHC Beaufort

== Final ==
- Tornado Luxembourg 14 - Rapids Remich 0
