= 1994–95 Luxembourg Cup (ice hockey) =

The 1994–95 Luxembourg Cup was the second playing of the Luxembourg Cup ice hockey tournament. Four teams participated in the tournament, which was won by the Chiefs Leuven.

== Final standings ==
	Club	GP	W	T	L	GF–GA	Pts
1.	(Belgium) Chiefs Leuven	10	9	0	1	168:34	18
2.	Tornado Luxembourg	10	9	0	1	143:58	18
3.	(Germany) ESV Kaiserslautern	10	4	0	6	65:96	8
4.	(France) Image Club Epinal	10	4	0	6	37:94	8
5.	(Germany) EHC Trier/EC Dillingen	10	3	0	7	45:70	6
6.	Lokomotive Luxembourg	10	1	0	9	28:134	2
