= 1995–96 Luxembourg Cup (ice hockey) =

The 1995–96 Luxembourg Cup was the third playing of the Luxembourg Cup ice hockey tournament. Four teams participated in the tournament, which was won by Tornado Luxembourg.

== First round ==
=== Group 1 ===
	Club	GP	W	T	L	GF–GA	Pts
1.	Tornado Luxembourg	4	3	1	0	29:19	7
2.	(France) Lions de Wasquehal	4	1	1	2	16:20	3
3.	(Belgium) Chiefs Leuven	4	1	0	3	18:24	2

=== Group 2 ===
- Lokomotive Luxembourg qualified for final.

== Final ==
- Tornado Luxembourg - Lokomotive Luxembourg 14:7
