= 2002–03 Luxembourg Cup (ice hockey) =

The 2002–03 Luxembourg Cup was the 10th playing of the Luxembourg Cup ice hockey tournament. Six teams participated in the tournament, which was won by Tornado Luxembourg.

== Final standings ==
	Club	GP	W	T	L	GF–GA	Pts
1.	Tornado Luxembourg	10	8	0	2	119:41	16
2.	(Germany) EV Bitburg	10	7	0	3	97:55	14
3.	(France) Galaxians d'Amnéville II	10	5	1	4	59:77	11
4.	(Germany) EHC Zweibrücken II	10	4	0	6	65:76	8
5.	(Luxembourg) Rapids Remich	10	3	1	6	58:73	7
6.	(Germany) EHC Trier II	10	1	2	7	43:109	4
