= 1997–98 Luxembourg Championship season =

The 1997-98 Luxembourg Championship season was the second season of Luxembourg's hockey league. Four teams participated in the league, and Tornado Luxembourg won the championship.

== Final ranking ==
	Club
1.	Tornado Luxembourg
2.	Lokomotiv Luxembourg
3.	Rapids Remich
4.	IHC Beaufort
