= 2001–02 Luxembourg Championship season =

The 2001-02 Luxembourg Championship season was the sixth season of Luxembourg's hockey league. Three teams participated in the league, and Tornado Luxembourg won the championship.

== Final ranking ==
	Club
1.	Tornado Luxembourg
2.	Rapids Remich
3.	IHC Beaufort
