= 1996–97 Luxembourg Cup (ice hockey) =

The 1996–97 Luxembourg Cup was the fourth playing of the Luxembourg Cup ice hockey tournament. Ten teams participated in the tournament, which was won by Tornado Luxembourg.

== Final standings ==
=== Division A ===
	Club	GP	W	T	L	GF–GA	Pts
1.	Tornado Luxembourg	8	7	0	1	96:49	14
2.	(Belgium) Chiefs Leuven	8	5	0	3	67:39	10
3.	(Germany) EHC Zweibrücken	8	4	0	4	64:71	8
4.	(Germany) Zweibrückener ERC	8	4	0	4	48:52	8
5.	(Germany) ESV Bitburg	8	0	0	8	29:93	0

=== Division B ===
	Club	GP	W	T	L	GF–GA	Pts
1.	(France) CSMG Charleville-Mézières	8	6	0	2	67:18	12
2.	Lokomotive Luxembourg	8	5	1	2	64:33	11
3.	(Germany) EHC Saarbrücken	8	4	0	4	38:35	8
4.	(Luxembourg) IHC Beaufort	8	3	1	4	36:53	7
5.	(Luxembourg) Rapids Remich	8	1	0	7	17:83	2
