= Jean-Claude Juncker =

Luxembourgish politician (born 1954)

The Honourable Jean-Claude Juncker
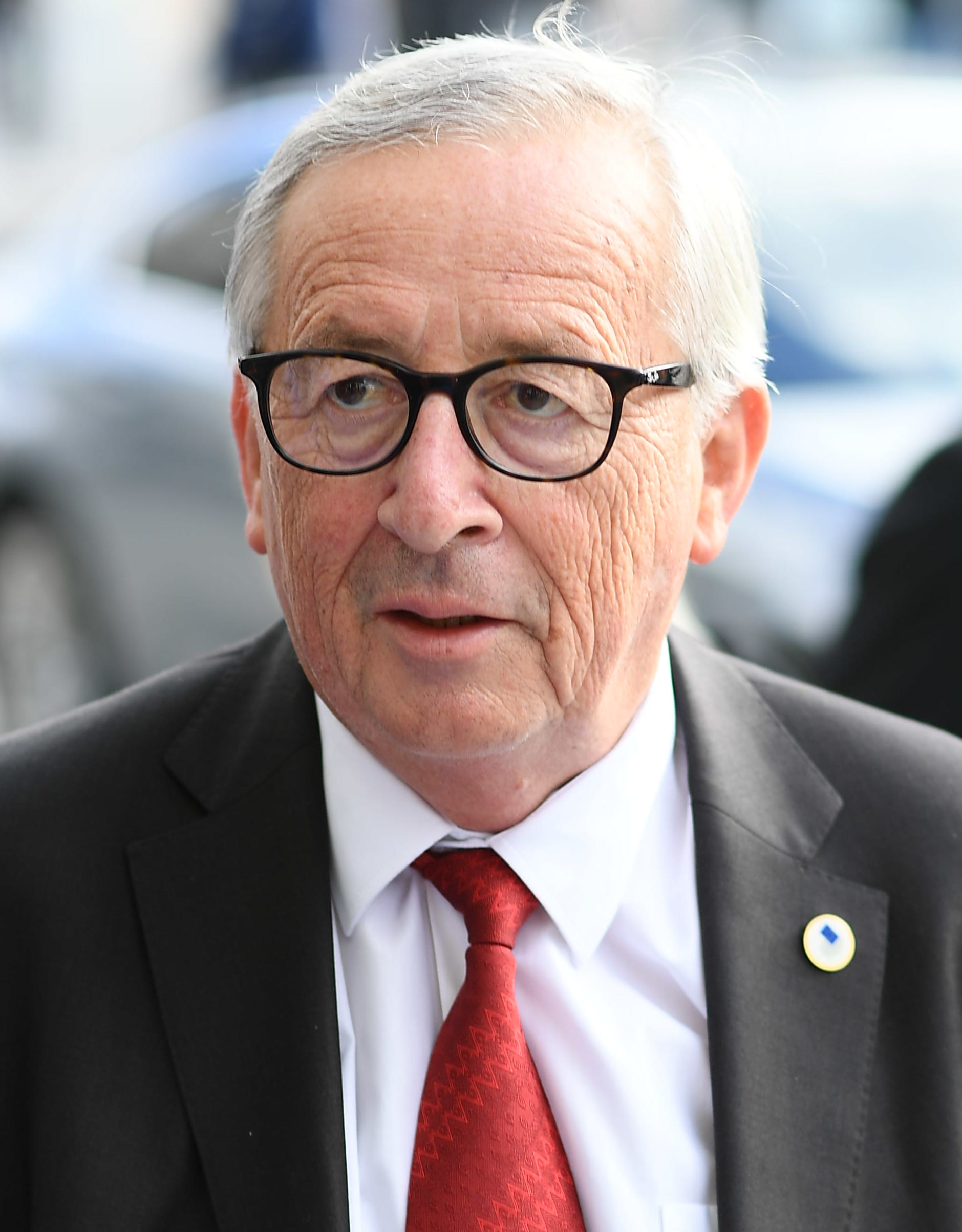
- Juncker in 2019

President of the European Commission
- In office 1 November 2014 – 30 November 2019
- Commission: Juncker
- First Vice President: Frans Timmermans
- Preceded by: José Manuel Barroso
- Succeeded by: Ursula von der Leyen

Prime Minister of Luxembourg
- In office 20 January 1995 – 4 December 2013
- Monarchs: Jean; Henri
- Deputy: Jacques Poos (1995–1999); Lydie Polfer (1999–2004); Jean Asselborn (2004–2013)
- Preceded by: Jacques Santer
- Succeeded by: Xavier Bettel

President of the Eurogroup
- In office 1 January 2005 – 21 January 2013
- Preceded by: Position established
- Succeeded by: Jeroen Dijsselbloem

Minister for the Treasury
- In office 23 July 2009 – 4 December 2013
- Prime Minister: Himself
- Preceded by: Luc Frieden
- Succeeded by: Office abolished

Minister for Finances
- In office 14 July 1989 – 23 July 2009
- Prime Minister: Jacques Santer; Himself
- Preceded by: Jacques Santer
- Succeeded by: Luc Frieden

Minister for Labour and Employment
- In office 20 July 1984 – 7 August 1999
- Prime Minister: Jacques Santer
- Preceded by: Jacques Santer
- Succeeded by: François Biltgen

Member of the Chamber of Deputies
- In office 5 December 2013 – 1 November 2014
- Succeeded by: Laurent Zeimet
- Constituency: South

Personal details
- Born: 9 December 1954 (age 71) Redange, Luxembourg
- Party: Christian Social People's Party (since 1974)
- Other political affiliations: European People's Party
- Spouse: Christiane Frising (m. 1979)
- Education: University of Strasbourg
- Jean-Claude Juncker's voice Juncker speaking following the results of the 2016 United Kingdom European Union membership referendum Recorded 24 June 2016

Jean-Claude Juncker (Note: Luxembourgish pronunciation: [ˈʒɑ̃ːkloːt ˈjuŋkɐ]) (born 9 December 1954) is a Luxembourgish politician who was prime minister of Luxembourg from 1995 to 2013 and president of the European Commission from 2014 to 2019. He was also Luxembourg's Finance Minister from 1989 to 2009 and President of the Eurogroup from 2005 to 2013.

By the time Juncker left office as prime minister in 2013, he was the longest-serving head of any national government in the EU and one of the longest-serving democratically elected leaders in the world, with his tenure encompassing the height of the European financial and sovereign debt crisis. In 2005, he became the first permanent President of the Eurogroup.

In 2014, the European People's Party (EPP) had Juncker as its lead candidate, or Spitzenkandidat, for the presidency of the Commission in the 2014 elections. This marked the first time that the Spitzenkandidat process was employed. Juncker is the first president to have campaigned as a candidate for the position prior to the election, a process introduced with the Treaty of Lisbon. The EPP won 220 out of 751 seats in the Parliament. On 27 June 2014, the European Council officially nominated Juncker for the position, and the European Parliament elected him on 15 July 2014 with 422 votes out of the 729 cast. He took office on 1 November 2014 and served until 30 November 2019, when he was succeeded by Ursula von der Leyen.

Juncker has stated that his priorities would be the creation of a digital single market, the development of an EU Energy Union, the negotiation of the Transatlantic Trade Agreement, the continued reform of the Economic and Monetary Union of the European Union—with the social dimension in mind, a "targeted fiscal capacity" for the Eurozone, and the 2015–2016 British EU membership renegotiations.

== Early life ==
Juncker was born in Redange and spent the majority of his childhood in Belvaux. His father, Joseph "Jos" Juncker (1924-2016), was a steel worker and Christian trade unionist who was forcibly conscripted into the German Wehrmacht during World War II, following the Nazi occupation of Luxembourg, and fought on the Eastern Front. Juncker has often remarked that the horrors of war he heard from his father's experiences had a profound influence in shaping his views on the need for European reconciliation and integration. His mother was born Marguerite Hecker. He cites the assassination of John F. Kennedy as his first political memory. Juncker studied at the Roman Catholic école apostolique (secondary school) at Clairefontaine on the edge of Arlon in Belgium, before returning to Luxembourg to study for his Baccalaureate at Lycée Michel Rodange. He joined the Christian Social People's Party in 1974. He studied law at the University of Strasbourg, graduating with a master's degree in 1979; although he was sworn into the Luxembourg Bar Council in 1980, he never practised as a lawyer.

Juncker grew up in Belvaux, in the commune of Sanem in the canton of Esch-sur-Alzette in the south of Luxembourg. Dominated by coal and steel manufacturing, the neighbourhood was home to a multicultural workforce of Italian and Portuguese immigrants. This social environment influenced Juncker's way of thinking and his ideology of integration and togetherness.

Juncker's father was heavily wounded during his service in the Wehrmacht at the Eastern Front, which left him visibly scarred. Throughout his life, Joseph Juncker was also a member of the LCGB Christian trade union, and he took his son to several union and party meetings, which impacted his son's political views even in his early days. Having come from a poor family, he made central to his political ideology the fight against social inequalities, and for equal opportunities and fairness for all people. Jean-Claude went to a Jesuit Boarding school close to the border of Belgium; as a schoolboy, Juncker negotiated and debated with the school's administrators on behalf of his classmates. Juncker was one of twelve children in a large household, where money was tight; he learned from a young age the importance of saving. This experience proved useful during his later role as Minister of Finance.

== Career in national politics ==
=== Early years ===
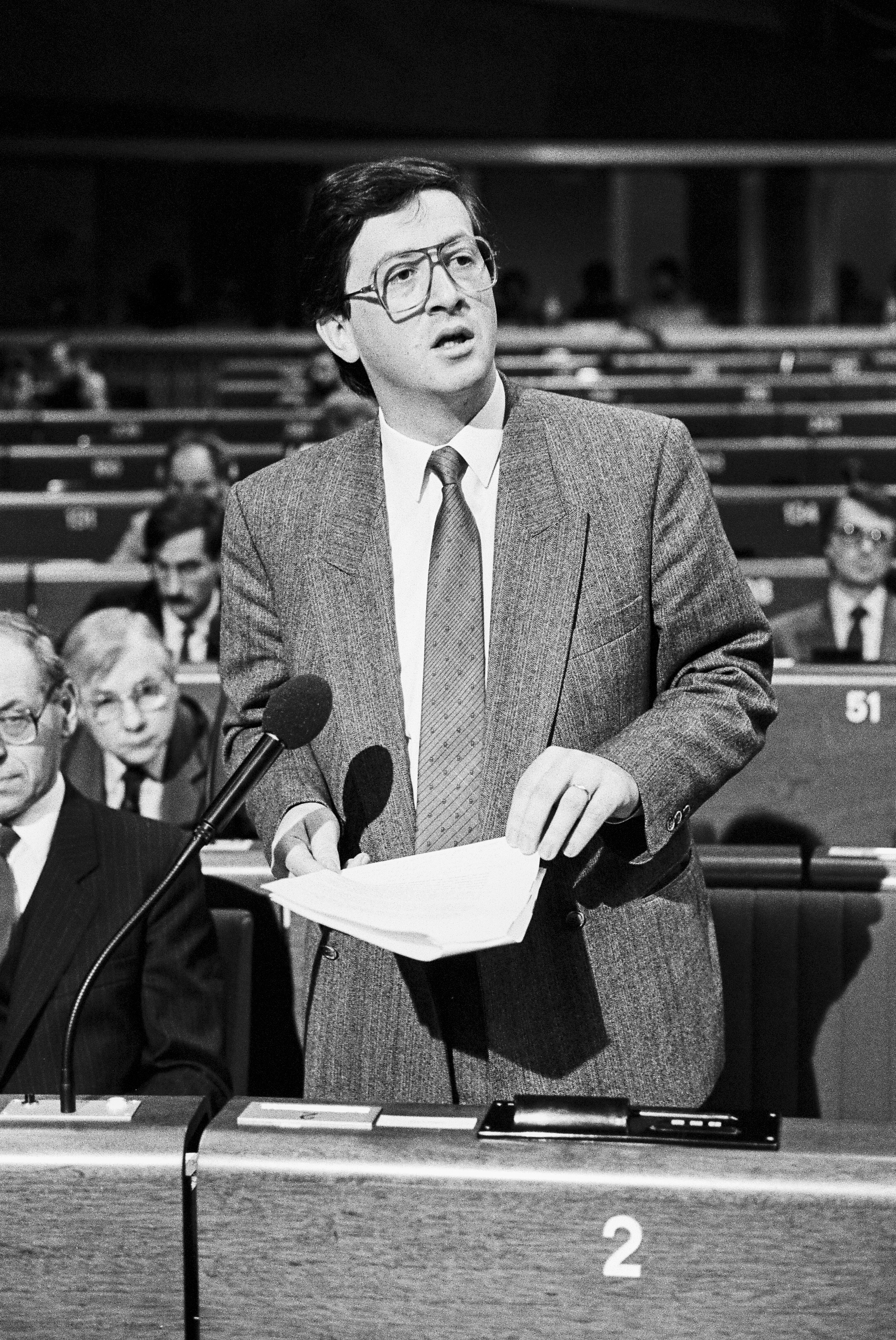
Juncker at the European Parliament in 1985

Following Juncker's graduation from the University of Strasbourg, he was appointed as a Parliamentary Secretary. He later won election to the Chamber of Deputies for the first time in 1984 and was immediately appointed to the Cabinet of Prime Minister Jacques Santer as Minister of Labour. In the second half of 1985, Luxembourg held the rotating presidency of the Council of the European Communities, permitting Juncker to develop his European leadership qualities as chair of the Social Affairs and Budget Councils. It was here that Juncker's pro-Europe credentials first emerged.

At the 1989 election, Juncker was promoted to become Minister for Finance in the Santer-Poos II Government, a post traditionally seen as a rite of passage to the country's premiership. His eventual promotion to prime minister seemed at this time inevitable, with political commentators concluding that Santer was grooming Juncker as his successor. Juncker at this time also accepted the position of Luxembourg's representative on the 188-member Board of Governors of the World Bank. On 28 October 1989, while driving on the A6 motorway near Capellen, Juncker lost control of his vehicle, which struck and flew over a guardrail. He was seriously injured in the accident, spending two weeks in a coma and six months in a wheelchair. He has stated that the accident has caused him difficulty with balancing since.

Juncker's second election to Parliament, in 1989, saw him gain prominence within the European Union; Juncker chaired the Council of Economic and Financial Affairs (ECOFIN), during Luxembourg's 1991 presidency of the Council of the European Communities, becoming a key architect of the Maastricht Treaty. Juncker was largely responsible for clauses on Economic and Monetary Union, the process that would eventually give rise to the euro, as well as in particular is credited with devising the "opt-out" principle for the UK to assuage its concerns. Juncker was himself a signatory to the Treaty in 1992, having, by that time, taken over as parliamentary leader of the Christian Social People's Party.

Juncker was re-elected to the Chamber in 1994, maintaining his ministerial role. With Santer ready to be nominated as the next president of the European Commission, it was only six months later that Grand Duke Jean approved the appointment of Juncker as prime minister on 20 January 1995, as part of a coalition with the Luxembourg Socialist Workers' Party. Juncker relinquished his post at the World Bank at this time but maintained his position as Minister for Finance.

=== Premiership (1995–2013) ===
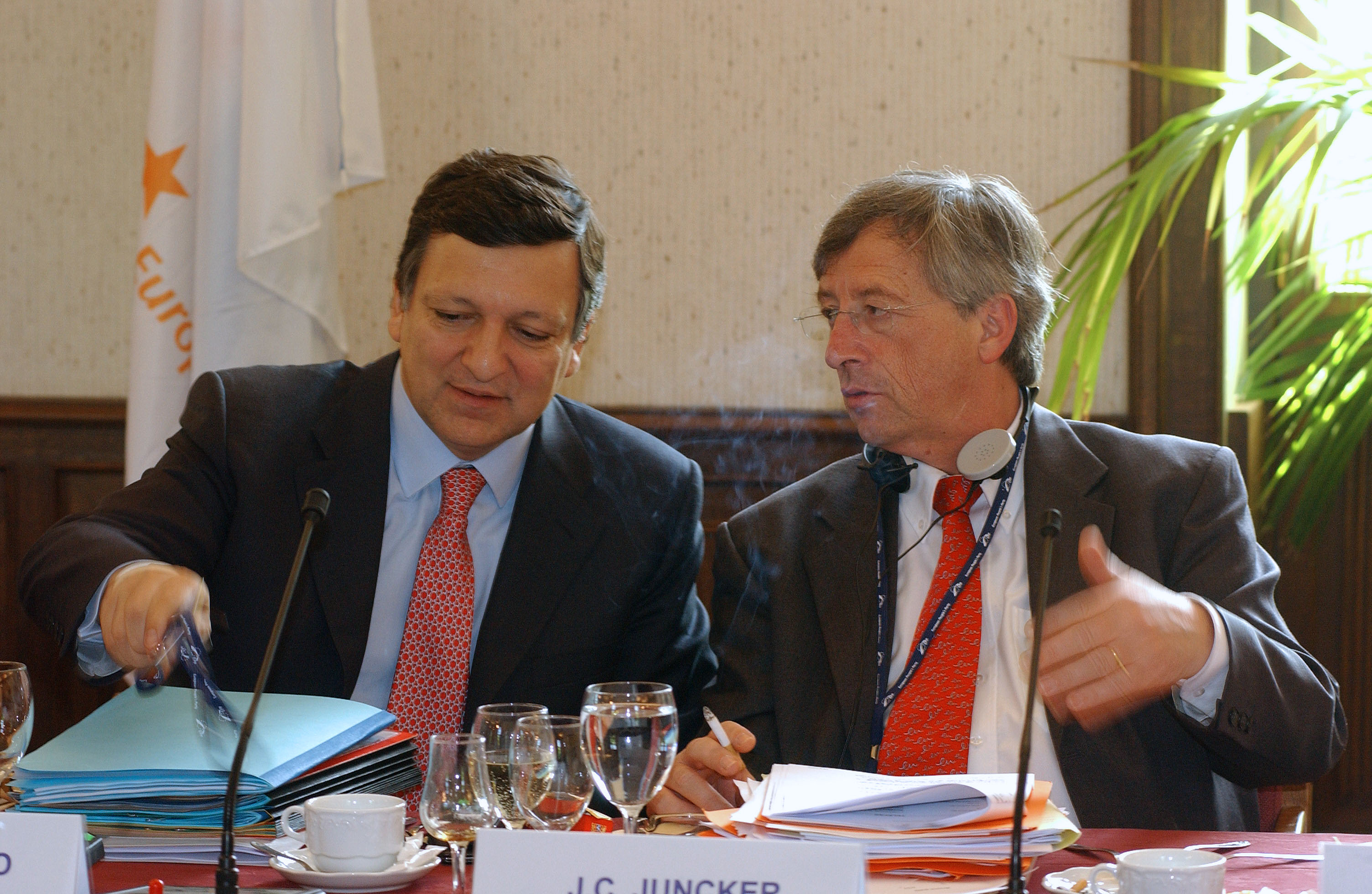
Juncker with President of the European Commission José Manuel Barroso on 16 June 2005

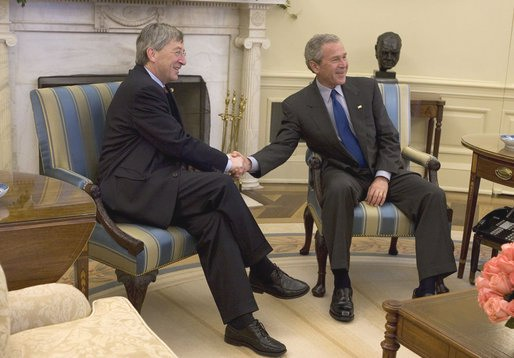
Juncker with President George W. Bush (2005)

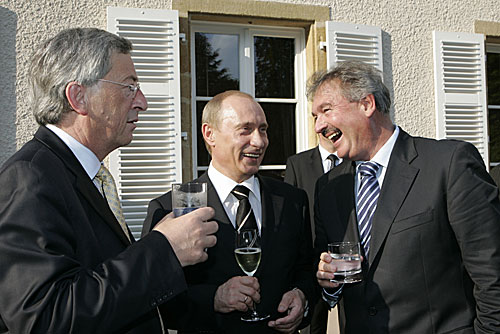
Juncker with Russian president Vladimir Putin and Jean Asselborn on 24 May 2007

Juncker's first term as prime minister was focused on an economic platform of international bilateral ties to improve Luxembourg's profile abroad, which included a number of official visits abroad. During one such visit, to Dublin in December 1996, Juncker successfully mediated a dispute over his own EU Economic and Monetary Union policy between French president Jacques Chirac and German chancellor Helmut Kohl. The press dubbed Juncker the "Hero of Dublin" for achieving an unlikely consensus between the two.

1997 brought the rotating presidency of the European Council to Luxembourg, during which time Juncker championed the cause of social integration in Europe, along with constituting the so-called "Luxembourg Process" for integrated European policy against unemployment. He also instigated the "Euro 11", an informal group of European finance ministers for matters regarding his Economic and Monetary Union ideals. For all of these initiatives, he was honoured with the Vision for Europe Award in 1998.

Juncker succeeded in winning another term as prime minister in the 1999 election, although the coalition with the Luxembourg Socialist Workers' Party was broken in favour of one with the Democratic Party. After the 2004 election, the Luxembourg Socialist Workers' Party became the second largest party again, and Juncker again formed a coalition with them.

In 2005, Juncker inherited a second term as President of the European Council. Shortly after the expiration of his term came Luxembourg's referendum on ratification, and Juncker staked his political career on its success, promising to resign if the referendum failed. The final result was a 56.5% Yes vote on an 88% turnout. His continued allegiance to European ideals earned him the 2006 Karlspreis. In 2009, he denounced the lifting of the excommunication of controversial Bishop Richard Williamson, a member of the Society of Saint Pius X.

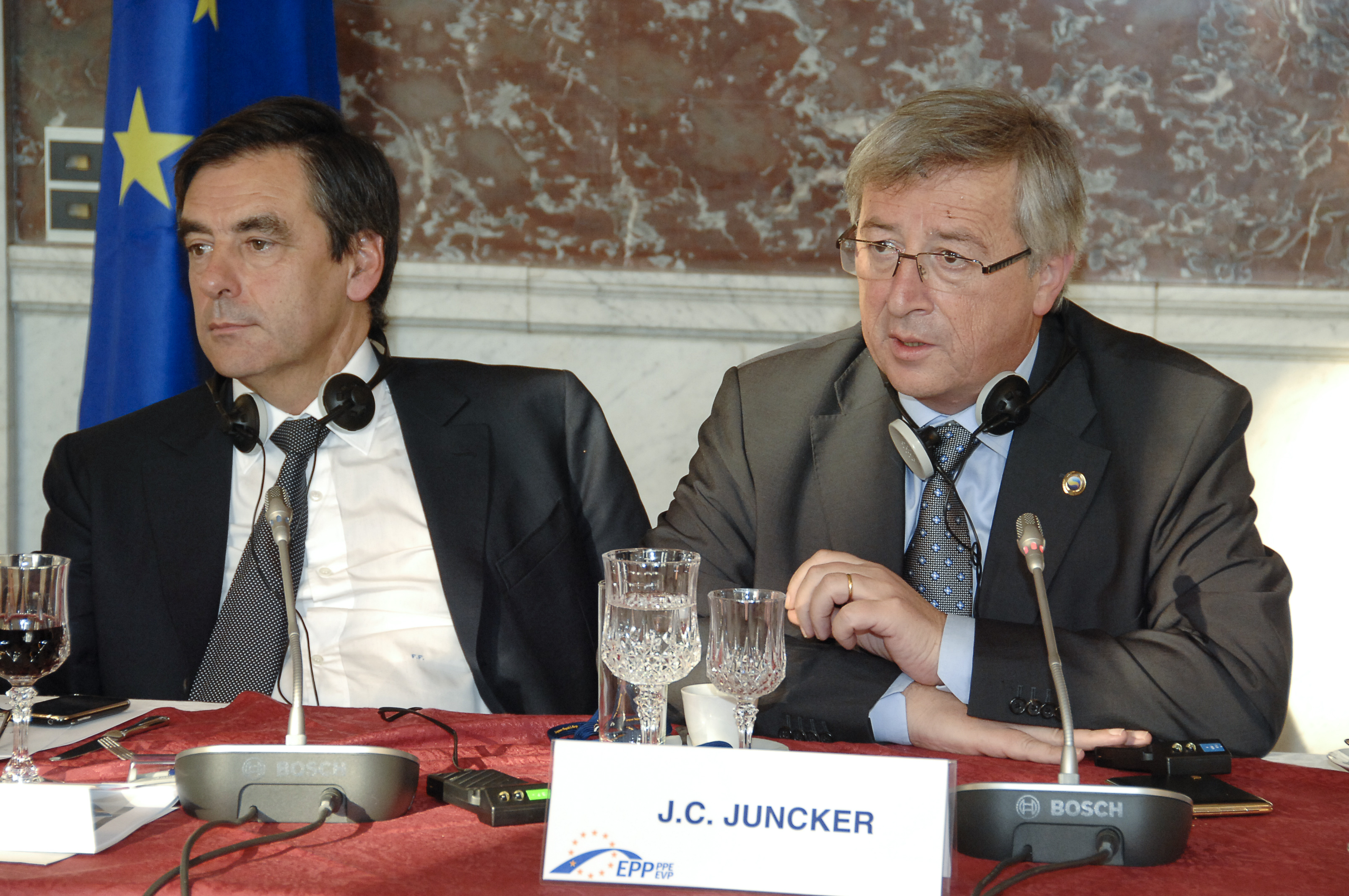
Juncker with French prime minister François Fillon on 29 October 2009

Juncker supported the 2011 military intervention in Libya. Juncker added that he wanted NATO to take control of coalition military efforts in Libya as soon as possible.

On 19 November 2012, RTL Télé Lëtzebuerg aired a story alleging that the former head of the State Intelligence Service (SREL), Marco Mille, had used a wristwatch to covertly record a confidential conversation with Juncker in 2008. According to the report, although Juncker had later found out about the recording, he took no action against Mille and allowed him to leave the service in 2010 for a position with Siemens. A transcript of the conversation was published by D'Lëtzebuerger Land, which highlighted the disorganised state of the secret service, mentioned links between Grand Duke Henri and MI6 and referred to the "Bommeleeër" scandal. On 4 December 2012, the Chamber of Deputies voted to set up a Parliamentary Inquiry into allegations of SREL misconduct including the illegal bugging of politicians, purchase of cars for private use and allegations of taking payments and favours in exchange for access to officials. The inquiry heard from witnesses who claimed that SREL had conducted six or seven illegal wiretapping operations between 2007 and 2009, as well as covert operations in Iraq, Cuba and Libya. The report concluded that Juncker had to bear political responsibility for SREL's activities, that he had been deficient in his control over the service and that he had failed to report all of the service's irregularities to the enquiry commission. Juncker himself denied wrongdoing.

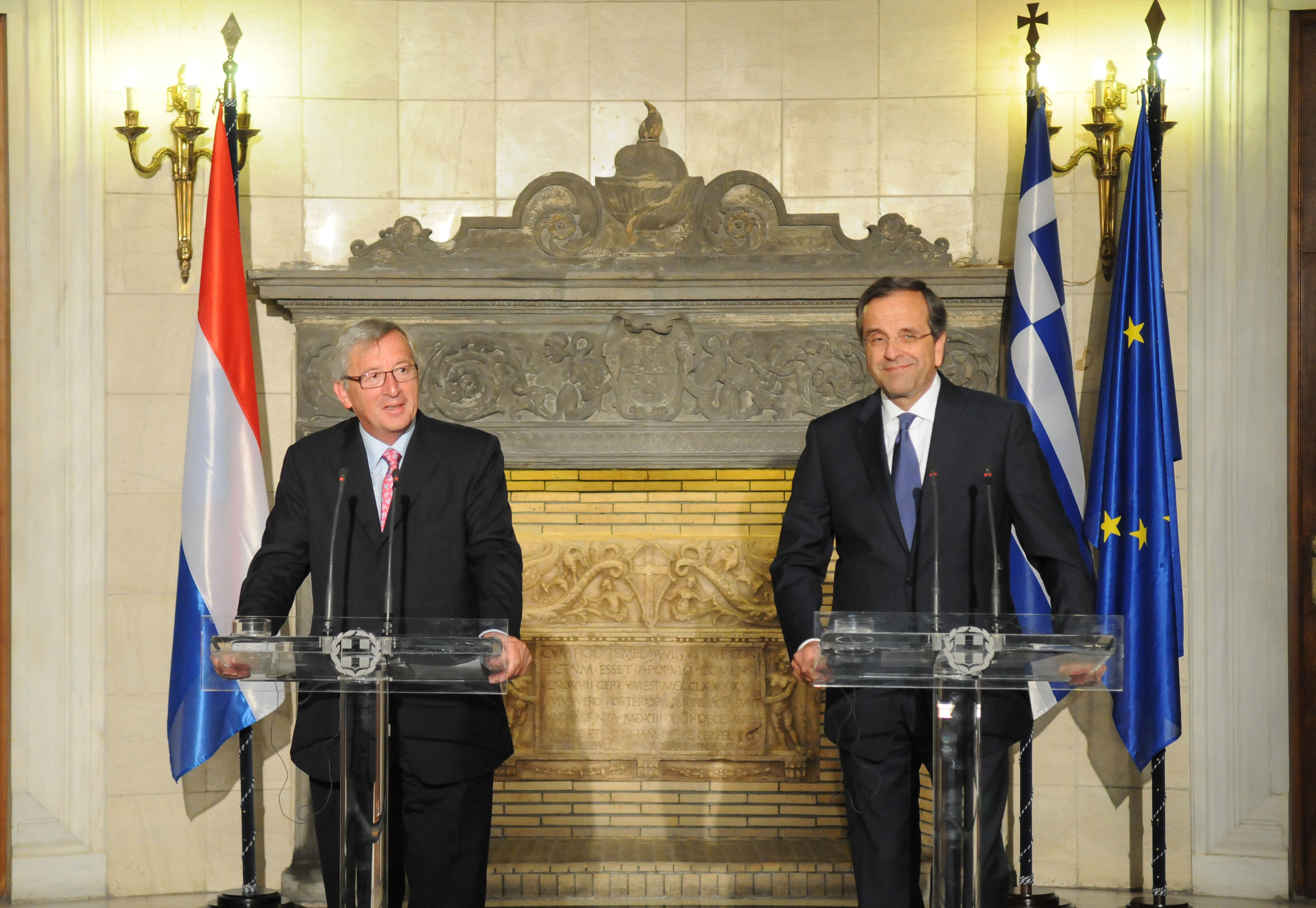
Juncker with Greek prime minister Antonis Samaras on 22 August 2012

After a seven-hour debate in the Chamber of Deputies on 10 July, the withdrawal of support from the Christian Social People's Party's coalition partner, the Luxembourg Socialist Workers' Party (LSAP), forced Juncker to agree to new elections. Alex Bodry, President of LSAP and Chair of the Parliamentary Inquiry into SREL, declared his lack of confidence in Juncker, saying: "We invite the prime minister to take full political responsibility in this context and ask the government to intervene with the head of state to clear the path for new elections." Juncker tendered his resignation to the Grand Duke on 11 July. After the election, the CSV entered the opposition for the first time in 34 years and Juncker was succeeded on 4 December 2013 by Xavier Bettel.

== Career in European politics ==
=== Presidency of the Eurogroup ===
In 2004, the Eurogroup of eurozone finance ministers decided to replace the rotating chairmanship with a permanent president. Juncker was appointed as the first permanent president and assumed the chair on 1 January 2005. He was re-appointed for a second term in September 2006. Under the Lisbon Treaty, this system was formalised and Juncker was confirmed for another term. Juncker stepped down on 21 January 2013, when he was succeeded by Dutch finance minister Jeroen Dijsselbloem.

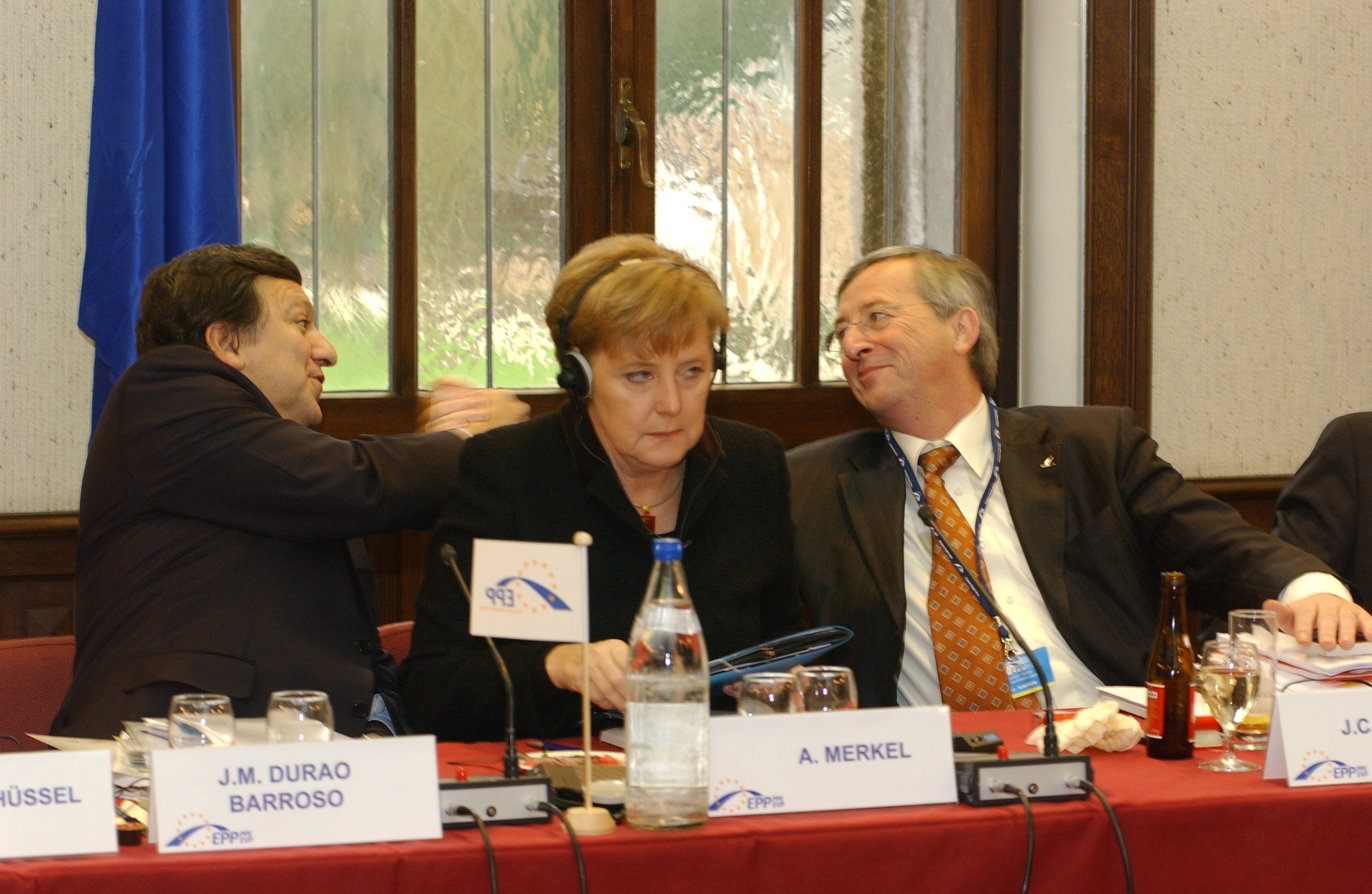
Juncker with Angela Merkel and José Manuel Barroso

During his period as "Mr. Euro", the group was instrumental in negotiating and supervising bailout packages for the countries that faced bankruptcy: Greece, Ireland, Portugal, Spain and Cyprus.

Juncker was also an outspoken proponent of enhanced internal cooperation and increased international representation of the group.

In a debate in 2011, during the height of the eurozone crisis, Juncker responded to a conference-goer's suggestion to increase the openness of the strategy discussions in the eurogroup, by stating: "When it becomes serious you have to lie". Scholars of financial markets have remarked that the quote is often taken out of context by critics; best practice amongst monetary policy committees in most states is to keep negotiations on decisions confidential to prevent markets from betting against troubled countries until they are finalised. This need is complicated by the Eurozone's arrangements, in which policy negotiations are held in high-profile international summits of Eurozone finance ministers, where leaks of ongoing negotiations may potentially put "millions of people at risk". Indeed, the quote continues;

Monetary policy is a serious issue. We should discuss this in secret, in the Eurogroup. ... The same applies to economic and monetary policies in the Union. If we indicate possible decisions, we are fuelling speculations on the financial markets and we are throwing in misery mainly the people we are trying to safeguard from this. ... I'm ready to be insulted as being insufficiently democratic, but I want to be serious, ... I am for secret, dark debates.

— Juncker, on the constraints to openness from market actors during the financial crisis, 20 April 2011. This comment has been considered a quip.

He further stated that when asked by a journalist to comment on those meetings he had had to lie, making clear it went against his personal moral conviction as a Catholic.

=== Presidency of the European Commission (2014–2019) ===
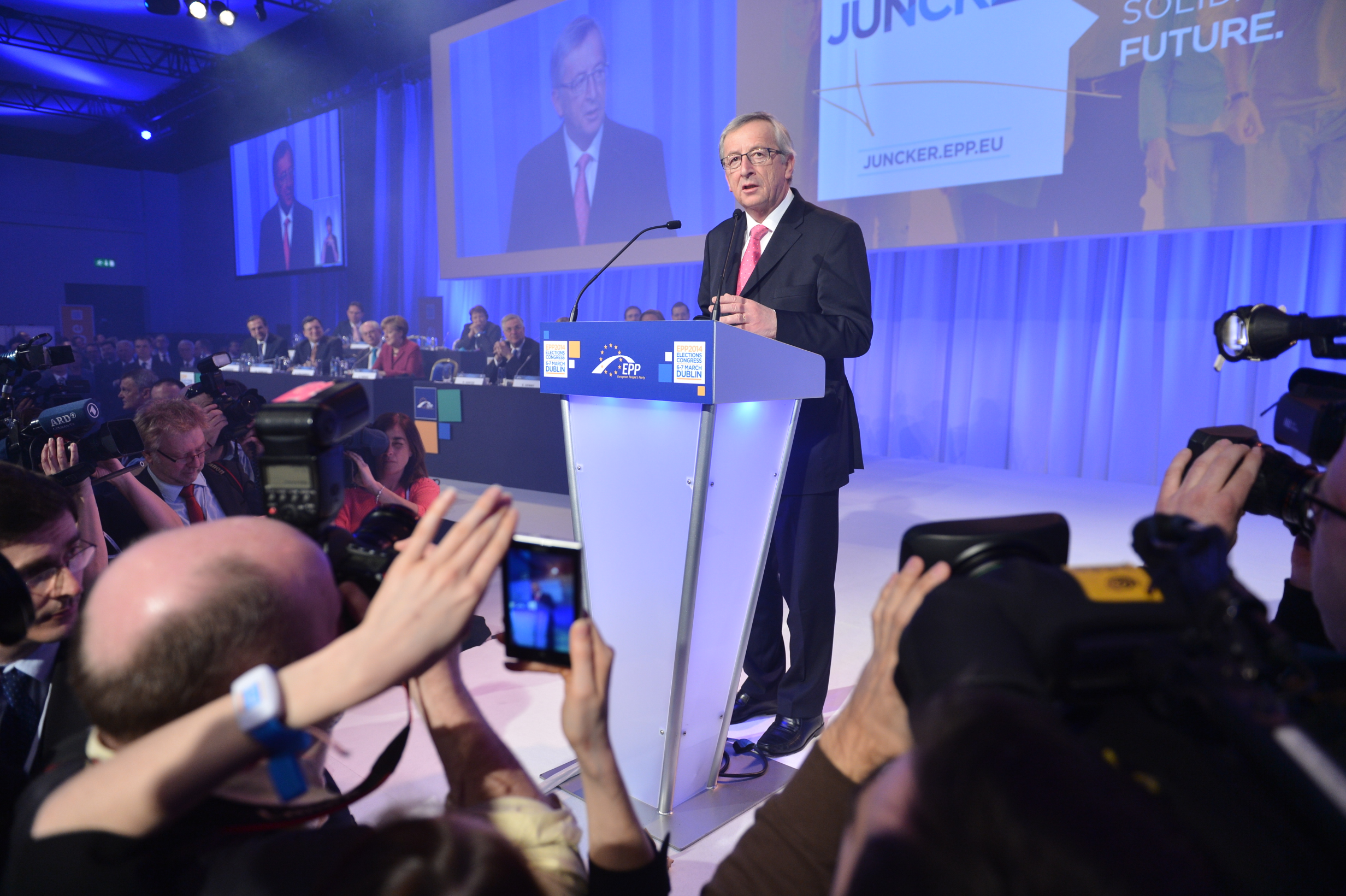
Juncker delivering a speech at the election congress of the People's Party in March 2014

For the first time in 2014, the President of the European Commission was appointed under the new provisions established with the Treaty of Lisbon, which had entered into force after the 2009 Elections to the European Parliament, on 1 December 2009. Juncker's aide Martin Selmayr played a central role in his campaign and later during his presidency as Juncker's campaign director, head of Juncker's transition team and finally as Juncker's head of cabinet (chief of staff).

==== Primary election ====
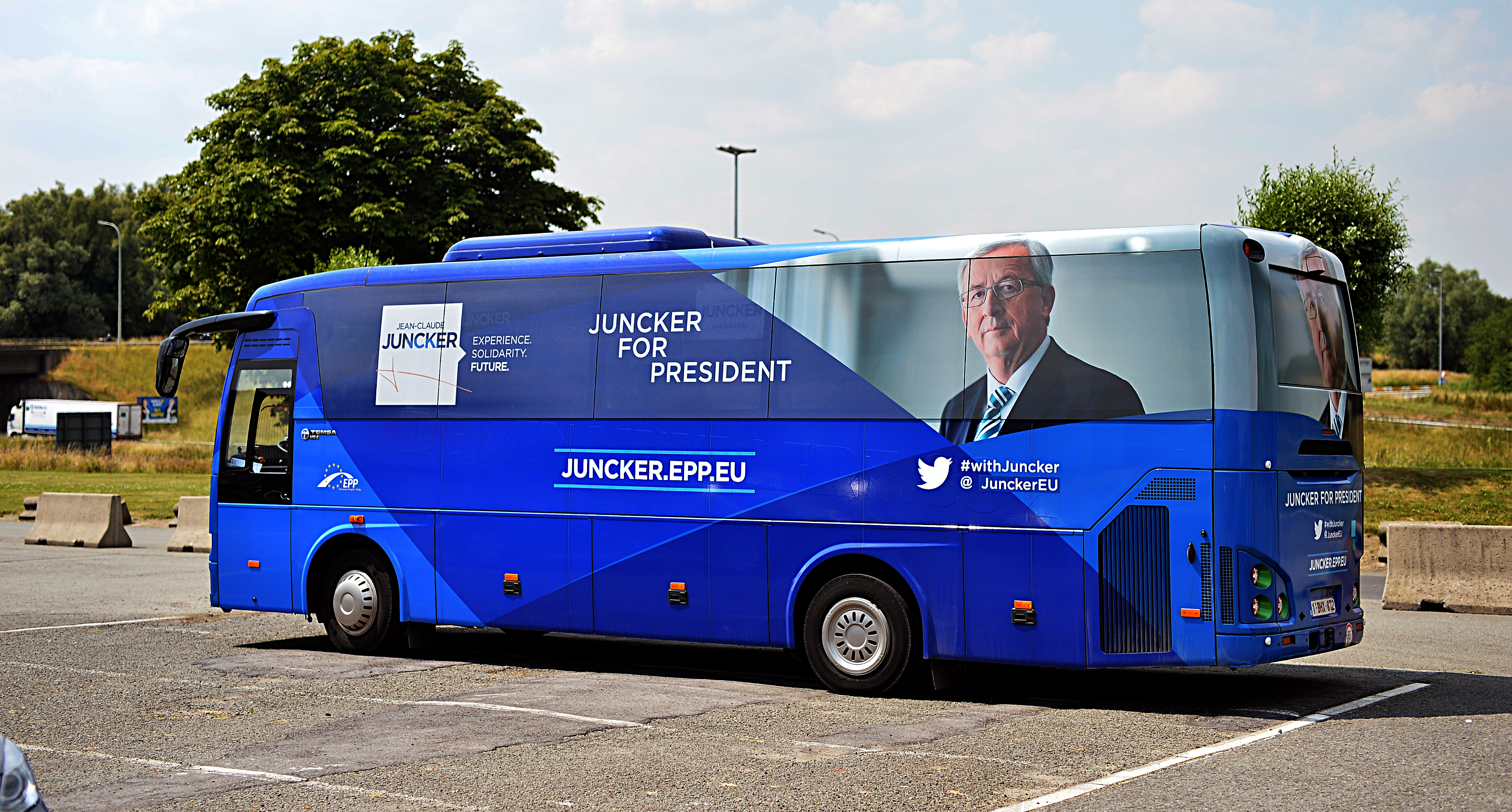
The campaign bus of Juncker used for the 2014 election

Almost all major European political parties put forward a lead candidate, or spitzenkandidat for their respective election campaign. At the election Congress of the European People's Party (EPP), held in Dublin on 6–7 March, Jean-Claude Juncker was elected the party's lead candidate for President of the commission, defeating Michel Barnier. The congress also adopted the EPP election manifesto, which was used by Juncker during his campaign.

==== Election campaign ====
In the main debate between the candidates, transmitted live throughout Europe on 16 May via the European Broadcasting Union, all candidates agreed that it would be unacceptable if the European Council would propose someone as Commission President who had not publicly campaigned for the position ahead of the election.

In the 22–25 May elections, the EPP won the most parliamentary seats of all parties (221 of 751) but was short of a majority in its own right.

==== Institutional approval ====
On 27 May, the leaders of five of the seven political groups of the parliament issued a statement that Jean-Claude Juncker, being the lead candidate of the party which won a plurality of the seats, should be given the first attempt to form the required majority to be elected Commission president. Only the ECR and EFD disagreed to this process.

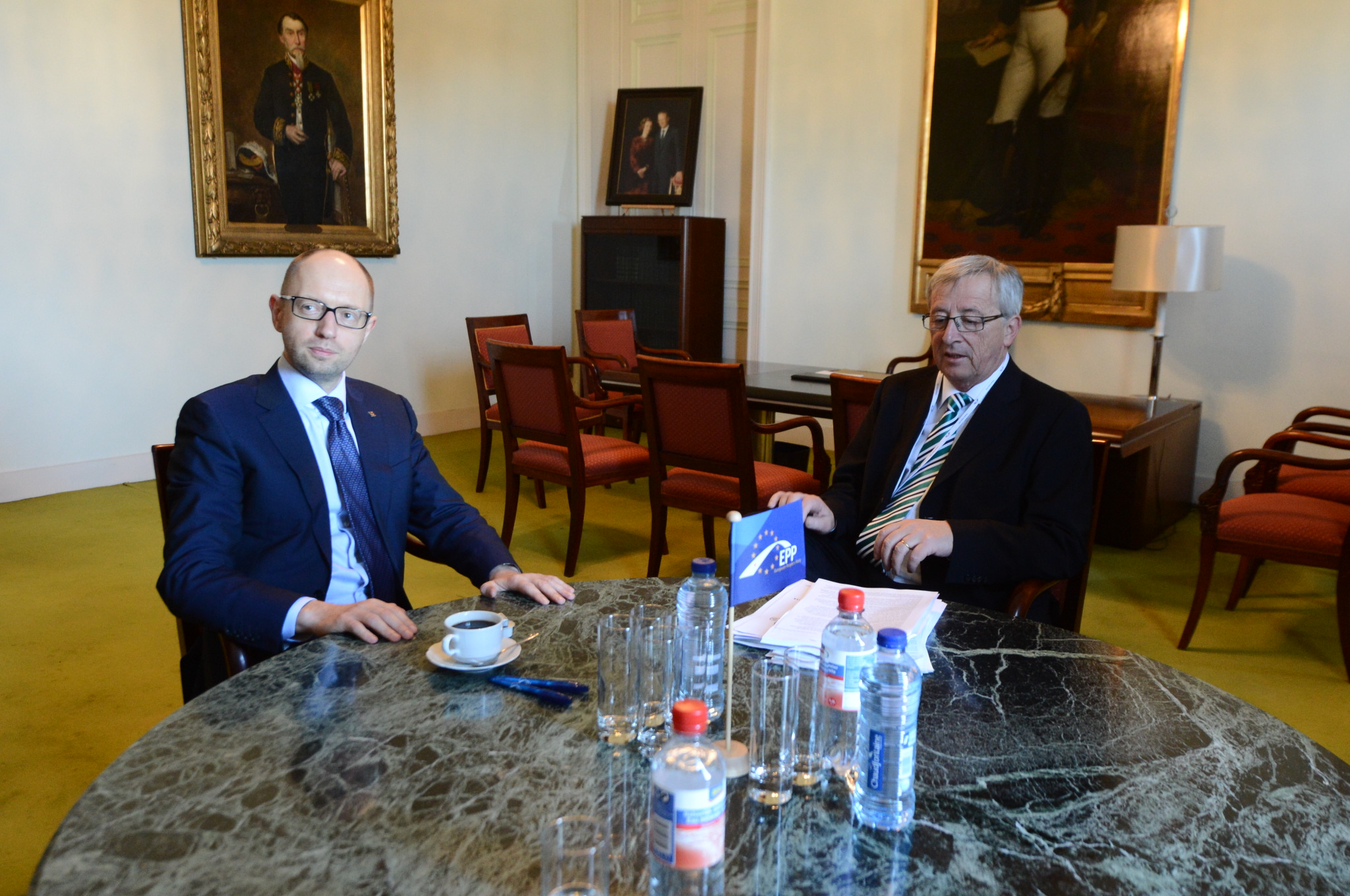
Juncker with Ukrainian PM Arseniy Yatseniuk, EPP summit in Brussels, 20 March 2014

Later on 27 May, the European Council gave its president, Herman van Rompuy, the mandate to start consultations with the group leaders in the European Parliament to identify the best possible candidate. Having less influence over the appointment than under pre-Lisbon law, the Council instead made use of its right to set the strategic priorities and included discussions with Parliament leaders and Council members alike for a strategic agenda for the upcoming period in Rompuy's mandate.

During the consultations, Juncker and the EPP agreed to cooperation with the Progressive Alliance of Socialists and Democrats (S&D), the second largest group in the new parliament, as well as secured the backing of all but two member state leaders. In return for their support, the centre-left group and state leaders secured promises of a shift in focus away from austerity towards growth and job creation for the coming period, as well as promises of some of the top jobs.

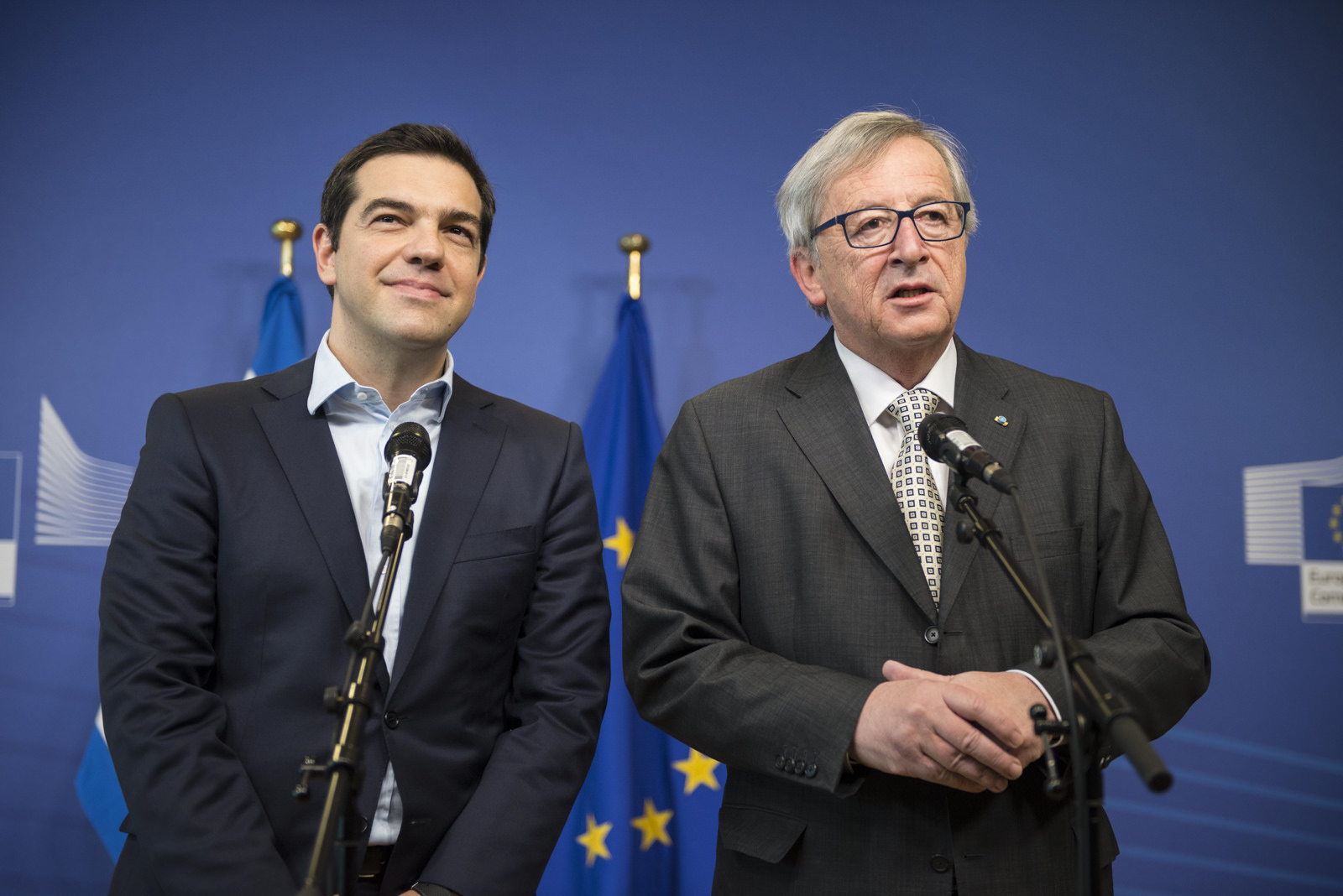
Juncker with Greek prime minister Alexis Tsipras in Brussels in March 2015

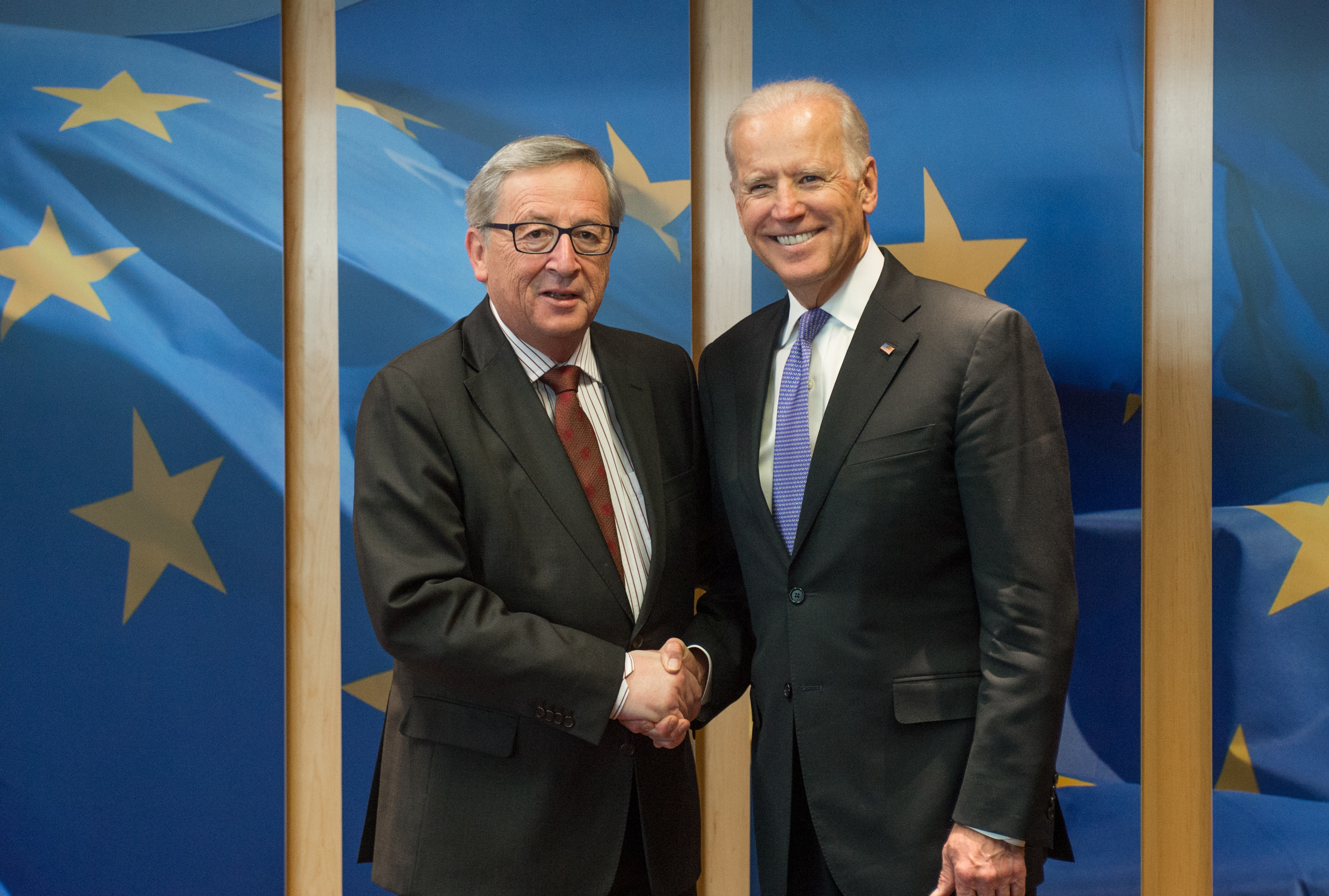
Juncker with U.S. vice president Joe Biden in June 2015

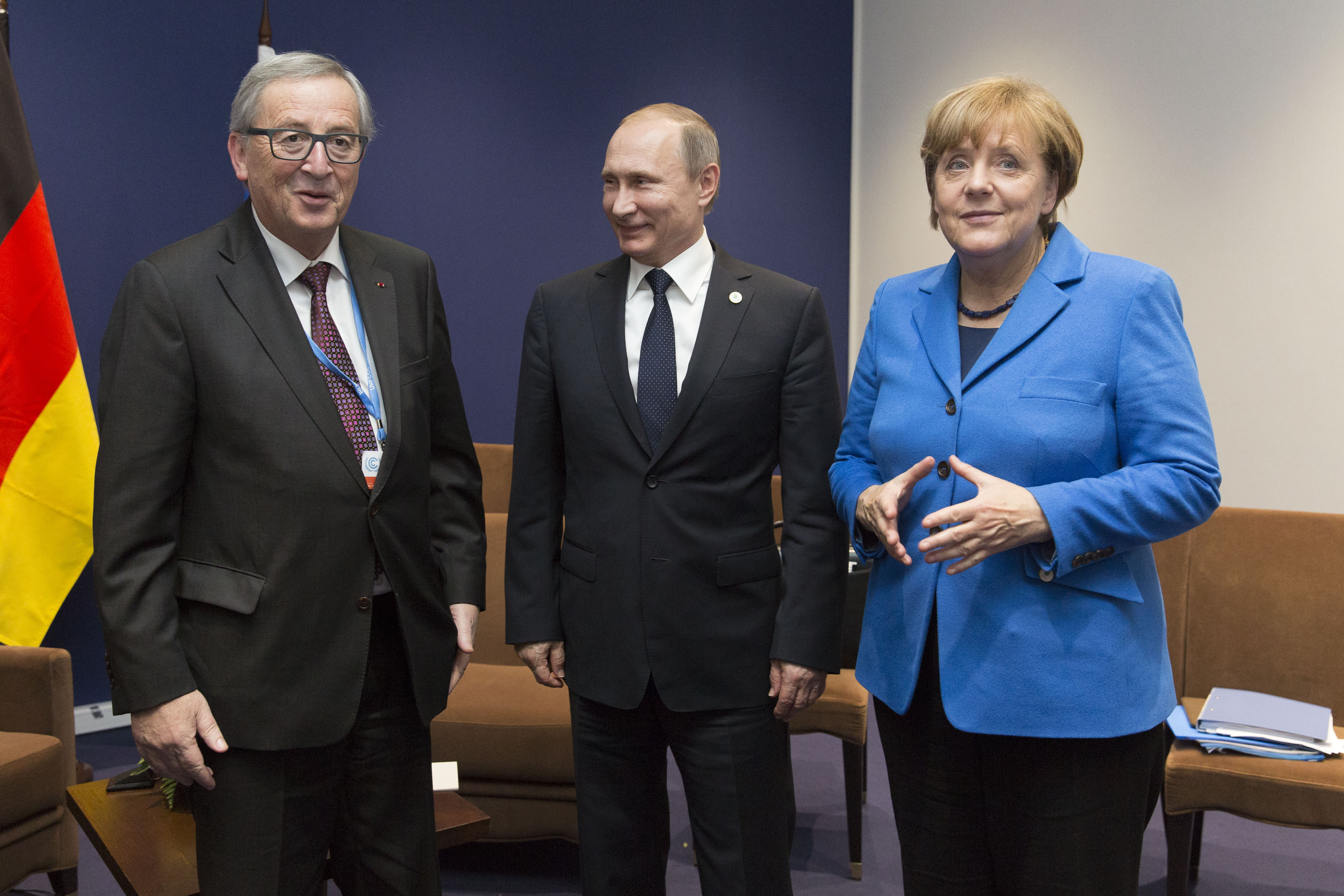
Juncker with Russian president Vladimir Putin and German chancellor Angela Merkel in November 2015

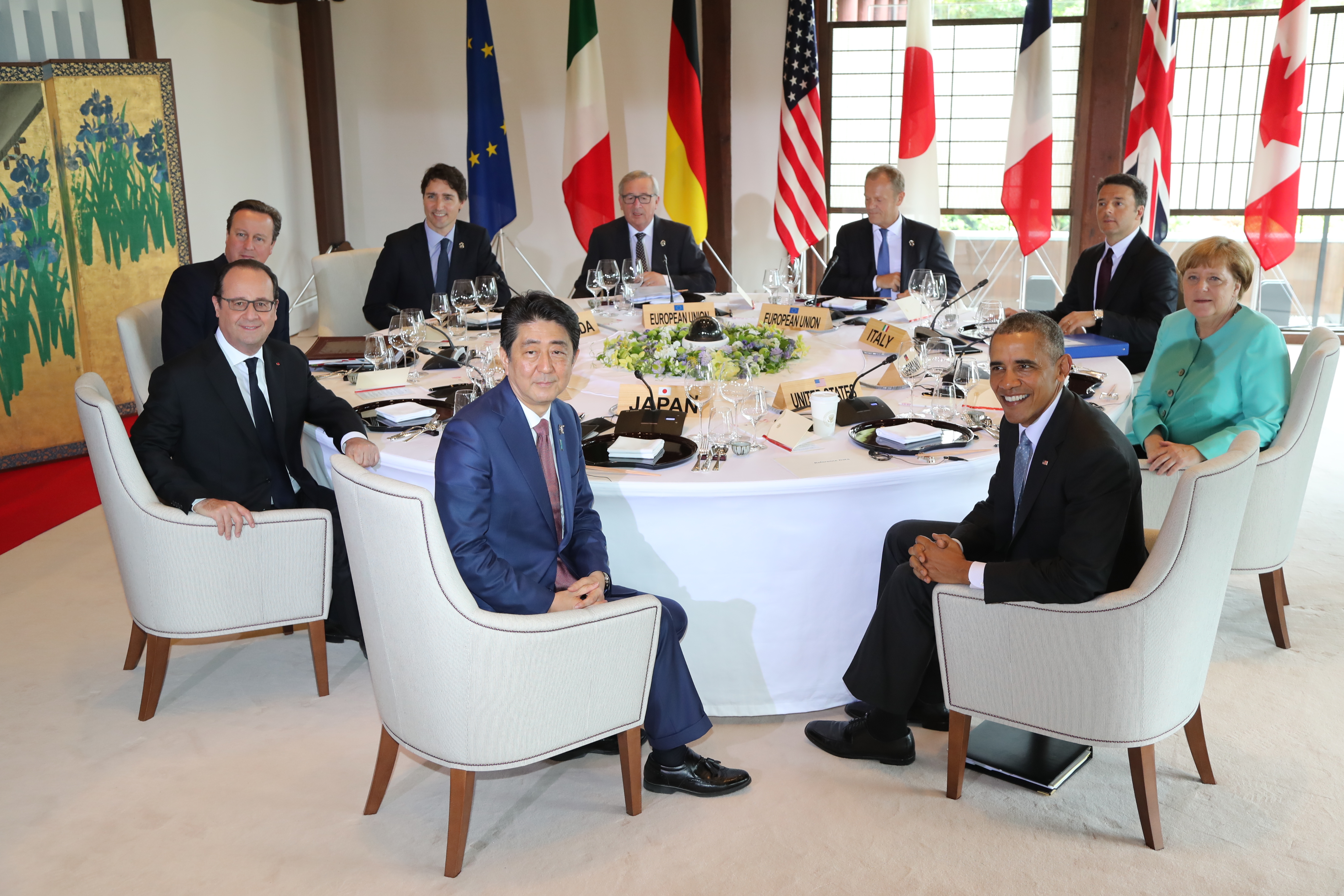
G7 leaders in Japan, 26 May 2016

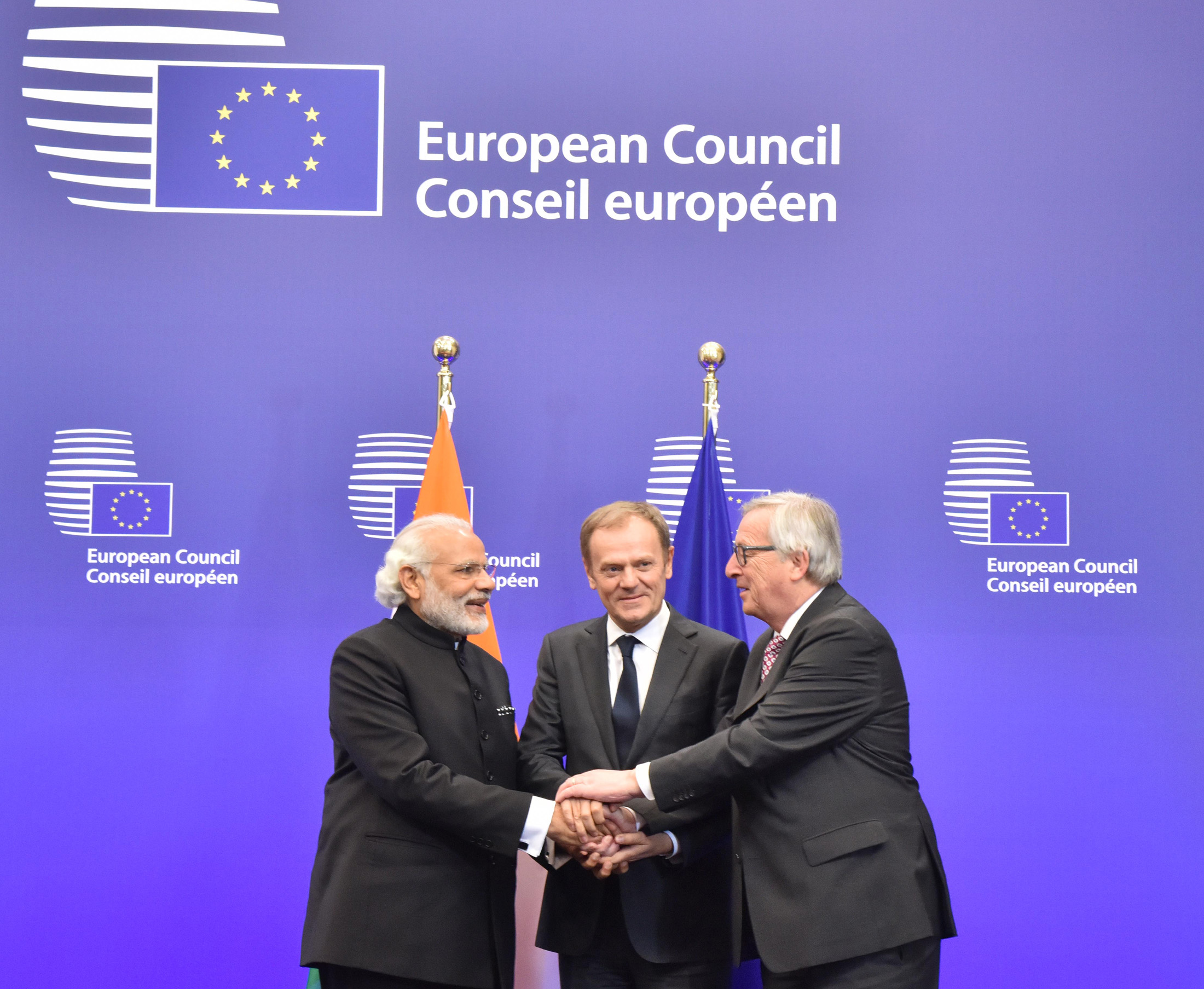
Indian PM Narendra Modi with Juncker and Donald Tusk at the EU-India Summit, Brussels, 2016

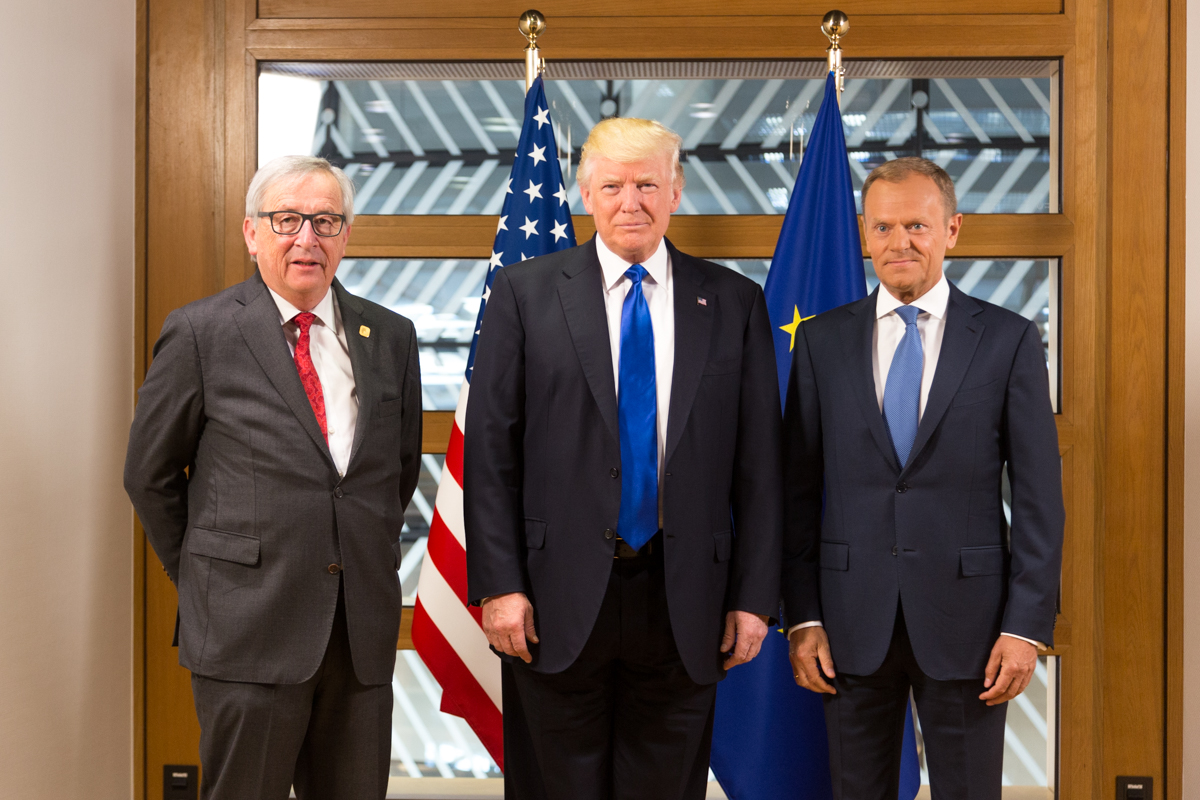
Juncker meets with President of the European Council Donald Tusk and U.S. president Donald Trump in Brussels, 25 May 2017

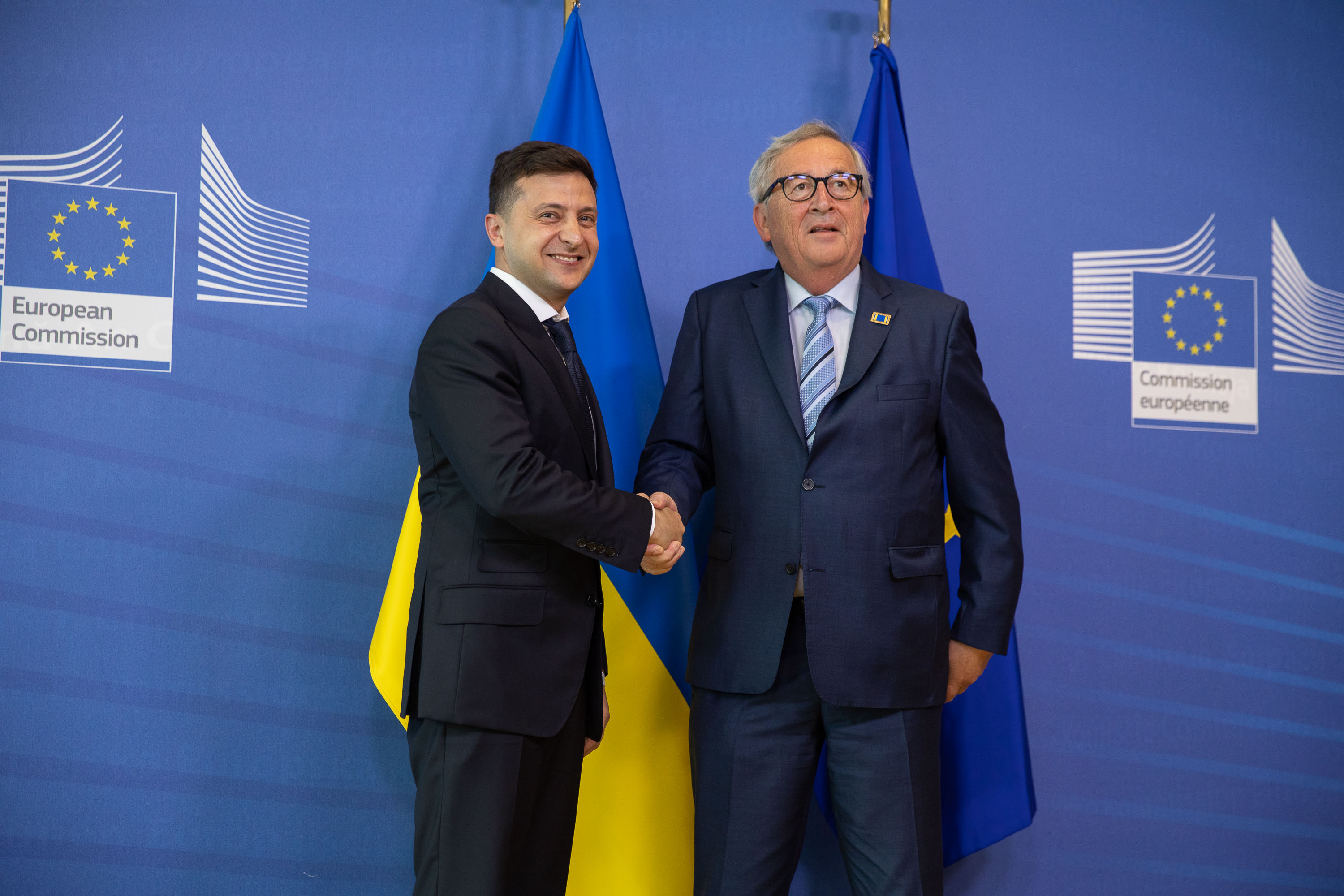
Juncker with Ukrainian president Volodymyr Zelenskyy in Brussels in June 2019

The European Council officially proposed Juncker to Parliament as a candidate for the presidency on 27 June, together with a strategic agenda that set out policy priorities for the upcoming Commission mandate period.

For the first time, the nomination was not by consensus, but the European Council voted 26–2 to propose Juncker for the position. Voting against were British PM David Cameron (Conservative Party / AECR) and Hungarian PM Viktor Orbán (Fidesz / EPP), both of whom had frequently opposed Juncker during the election process. Prior to the vote, various media had reported the heads of government of Sweden, Netherlands and Germany were also having similar concerns regarding either the candidate himself, or the way the nomination process was conducted. This was however never confirmed by the politicians in question.

Once Juncker had been nominated by the Council he started visiting all of the political groups of the European Parliament in order to explain his visions as well as gain their support in order to get appointed as Commission President. The purpose was also to show that he had understood some criticism levelled by Eurosceptics in Brussels. This was demonstrated when the former prime minister of Luxembourg told the ECR lawmakers that "[d]espite what you may read in the British press, I do not want a United States of Europe," as well as "I do not believe that Europe can be constructed against the nation state."

On 15 July, Juncker presented his political programme to the European Parliament in plenary. Following a debate, the MEPs appointed Juncker to the position of Commission President with 422 votes in favour, well over the 376 required, and 250 votes against.

=== Turkish membership of the European Union ===
On 25 July 2016, Juncker said that Turkey was not in a position to become a member of the European Union in the near future and that accession negotiations between the EU and Turkey would be stopped immediately if the death penalty was brought back.

== Controversies ==
In early November 2014, just days after becoming head of the commission, Juncker was hit by media disclosures—derived from a document leak known as LuxLeaks—that Luxembourg under his premiership had turned into a major European centre of corporate tax avoidance. With the aid of the Luxembourg government, companies transferred tax liability for many billions of euros to Luxembourg, where the income was taxed at a fraction of 1%. Juncker, who in a speech in Brussels in July 2014 promised to "try to put some morality, some ethics, into the European tax landscape", was sharply criticised following the leaks. A subsequent motion of censure in the European Parliament was brought against Juncker over his role in the tax avoidance schemes. The motion was defeated by a large majority. During his tenure, Juncker also oversaw the 2014 opening of the Luxembourg Freeport, which former German Member of European Parliament Wolf Klinz dubbed "fertile ground for money laundering and tax evasion".

In January 2017, leaked diplomatic cables showed that Juncker, as Luxembourg's prime minister from 1995 until the end of 2013, blocked EU efforts to fight tax avoidance by multinational corporations. Luxembourg agreed to multinational businesses on an individualised deal basis, often at an effective rate of less than 1%.

In July 2017, Juncker described the European Parliament as "ridiculous" after only a few dozen MEPs came to attend a debate dedicated to evaluating Malta's time holding the 6-month term rotating Presidency of the Council of the EU, accusing MEPs of showing a lack of respect for smaller EU countries. Although rebuked for his remark by the Parliament's president, Antonio Tajani, Juncker responded, "I will never again attend a meeting of this kind." Jaume Duch Guillot, chief spokesman for the Parliament, later said on Twitter that Juncker "regretted" the incident and that Tajani considered the case closed. However, it is not known whether Juncker apologised for his outburst.

== The "Juncker Curse" ==
"We all know what to do, but we don’t know how to get re-elected once we have done it." has been attributed to Juncker, alluding to the fear faced by reformist governments in instituting necessary but unpopular reforms.

== Personal life ==
In addition to his native Luxembourgish, Juncker is fluent in English, French and German, and also speaks Latin.

Juncker suffers from sciatica attacks following his 1989 car accident, which causes him occasional unsteadiness while walking. A video of Juncker stumbling and receiving assistance from several EU politicians at a NATO leaders' event in July 2018 prompted comments about his health, though his spokesman dismissed the concerns.

Speculations about alcoholism surrounded Juncker for several years and have been discussed by several high-profile EU politicians. In 2014, Jeroen Dijsselbloem, at the time Dutch minister of finance, described Juncker in an interview as a "heavy smoker and drinker", but later apologized for his comments. Juncker himself has always denied these allegations in interviews, describing them as hurtful.

Juncker married Christiane Frising, whom he met during his studies, on 1 September 1979 in Ettelbruck. The couple have no children.

== Awards and decorations ==
=== National honours ===
- 1985: Knight of the Ordre des Arts et des Lettres (France)
- 1988: Grand Cross of the Order of Merit (Luxembourg)
- 1988: Grand Cross of the Order of Prince Henry the Navigator (Portugal)
- 2002: Grand Officer of the Legion of Honor (France)
- 2003: Grand Cross of the Order of the Star (Romania)
- 2004: Commander of the Order of Polonia Restituta (Poland)
- 2005: Grand Cross of the Order of Christ (Portugal)
- 2006: Grand Cross of the Order of the Three Stars (Latvia)
- 2007: Grand Cross of the Order of Adolphe of Nassau (Luxembourg)
- 2007: Grand Cross of the Order of Isabella the Catholic (Spain)
- 2007: Grand Cross of the Order of Merit of the Italian Republic (Italy)
- 2010: Collar pro Merito Melitensi (Sovereign Military Order of Malta)
- 2010: Grand Decoration of Honour in Gold with Sash (Austria)
- 2013: Grand Cross of the Order of the Redeemer (Greece)
- 2013: Grand Cross of the Federal Order of Merit (Germany)
- 2013: Grand Cross of the Order of Vytautas the Great (Lithuania)
- 2014: Order of Friendship (Kazakhstan)
- 2014: Grand Cross of the Royal Norwegian Order of Merit
- 2019: The First Class of the Order of Prince Yaroslav the Wise (Ukraine)
- 2019: Companion with Star of the National Order of Merit (Malta)
- 2020: Grand Cordon of the Order of the Rising Sun (Japan)

=== Academic and other distinctions ===
- 1998: Honorary Doctorate of the Miami University
- 1998: "Vision for Europe Award" of the Edmond Israel Foundation
- 1999: European Crafts Prize 1999 of North Rhine-Westphalia
- 2000: Insignia de l'Artisanat en Or (Gold Badge), of the Luxembourg Chamber of Crafts
- 2001: Honorary Doctorate of the University of Münster
- 2002: Cicero-Speakers Prize
- 2002: Prize of the European Federation of Taxpayers
- 2003: Honorary Doctorate of the University of Bucharest
- 2003: Honorary Citizenship of the City of Trier
- 2003: Heinrich Braun Award
- 2003: Quadriga Prize in the European Year of German Society Workshop
- 2004: Honorary Doctorate of the Democritus University of Thrace
- 2004: Honorary Citizen and Freeman of the City of Orestiada; with the unveiling of a street named after Prime Minister Juncker
- 2005: Walter Hallstein Prize
- 2005: Europeans of the Year
- 2005: Elsie Kuhn Leitz Prize from the "Association of Franco-German Companies"
- 2006: European of the Year 2005 from the French Press (Trombinoscope)
- 2006: International Charlemagne Prize of Aachen
- 2006: European Prize for Political Culture of the Hans Ringier Foundation
- 2007: Foreign Associate Member of the Academy of Moral and Political Sciences, Institut de France in lieu of the late Léopold Sédar Senghor
- 2007: Patron of the not-for-profit Animal Protection Association "EV Newfoundlanders"
- 2007: St Liborius Medal for Unity and Peace of the Archdiocese of Paderborn
- 2007: Coudenhove-Kalergi Badge of the Europa-Union Münster
- 2007: Peace Prize of the European Foundation for Ecology and Democracy
- 2007: Honorary Doctorate of the Robert Schuman University of Strasbourg
- 2007: Honorary Member of the Grand Ducal Institute of Luxembourg, Department of Moral and Political Sciences
- 2008: Gold Medal of the Jean Monnet Foundation for Europe
- 2008: Amilcar Cabral Medal, First Class of the Republic of Cape Verde
- 2008: German Citizenship Prize
- 2008: Franz Josef Strauss Prize
- 2008: Honorary Doctorate of the University of Pittsburgh
- 2008: State Prize of North Rhine-Westphalia
- 2008: Sharpest Blade Prize (City of Solingen)
- 2008: Small State Award of the Herbert Batliner-Europa Institute in Salzburg
- 2008: European Banker of the Year
- 2009: European Prize for Service Economies
- 2009: European Union Gold Medal (with Star)
- 2009: FASEL Foundation Award
- 2009: Social Market Economy, MA
- 2009: Honorary Senator of the European Academy of Sciences and Arts
- 2010: Winfried Prize of the City of Fulda
- 2010: Thomas à Kempis honorary stele
- 2010: Honorary Doctorate of the Medicine University of Innsbruck
- 2010: Saarland Medal of Merit
- 2010: Collier of the Fondation du Mérite européen
- 2010: Hanns Martin Schleyer Foundation
- 2010: Order of Merit of Baden-Württemberg
- 2011: Order of Merit of Rhineland-Palatinate
- 2011: Honorary Doctorate of the Faculty of Law, University of Athens
- 2011: European Culture Prize
- 2012: Werner Blindert Prize
- 2012: Sigillum Magnum, University of Bologna
- 2012: Honorary Doctorate of the University of Sheffield
- 2013: Honorary Doctorate of the University of Porto
- 2017: Honorary Doctorate of the Aristotle University of Thessaloniki
- 2017: Honorary Doctorate of the University of Salamanca
- 2017: Honorary Doctorate of the University of Coimbra
- 2017: Gold Medal of the Charles University

== See also ==
- List of prime ministers of Luxembourg
- Juncker–Poos Government (1995–1999)
- Juncker–Polfer Government (1999–2004)
- Juncker–Asselborn I Government (2004–2009)
- Juncker–Asselborn II Government (2009–2013)
- Luxembourg Leaks

Political offices
Preceded by Jacques Santer	Minister for Work and Employment; 1984–1999	Succeeded by François Biltgen
Preceded by Jacques Santer	Minister for Finances; 1989–2009	Succeeded by Luc Frieden
Preceded by Jacques Santer	Prime Minister of Luxembourg; 1995–2013	Succeeded by Xavier Bettel
Preceded by Luc Frieden	Minister for the Treasury; 2009–2013	Vacant
Preceded by Martine Reicherts	Luxembourgish European Commissioner; 2014–2019	Succeeded by Nicolas Schmit
Preceded by José Manuel Barroso	President of the European Commission; 2014–2019	Succeeded by Ursula von der Leyen
Party political offices
Preceded by Jean Spautz	Leader of the Christian Social People's Party; 1990–1995	Succeeded by Erna Hennicot-Schoepges
Diplomatic posts
New office	President of the Eurogroup; 2005–2013	Succeeded by Jeroen Dijsselbloem
