= Bombers Affair =

Serial bombing attacks in Luxembourg (1984–1986)

The Bombers Affair (Luxembourgish: Bommeleeër Affär) is the name given to a series of bomb attacks on infrastructure installations and public buildings in the Grand Duchy of Luxembourg between May 1984 and April 1986. The identities of the perpetrators and the motives are not known; however, the population developed a diverse set of conspiracy theories. Many believe that members of the Luxembourgish Government or Grand Ducal Family, as well as insiders in the Security Services were involved in the attacks.

== Events ==
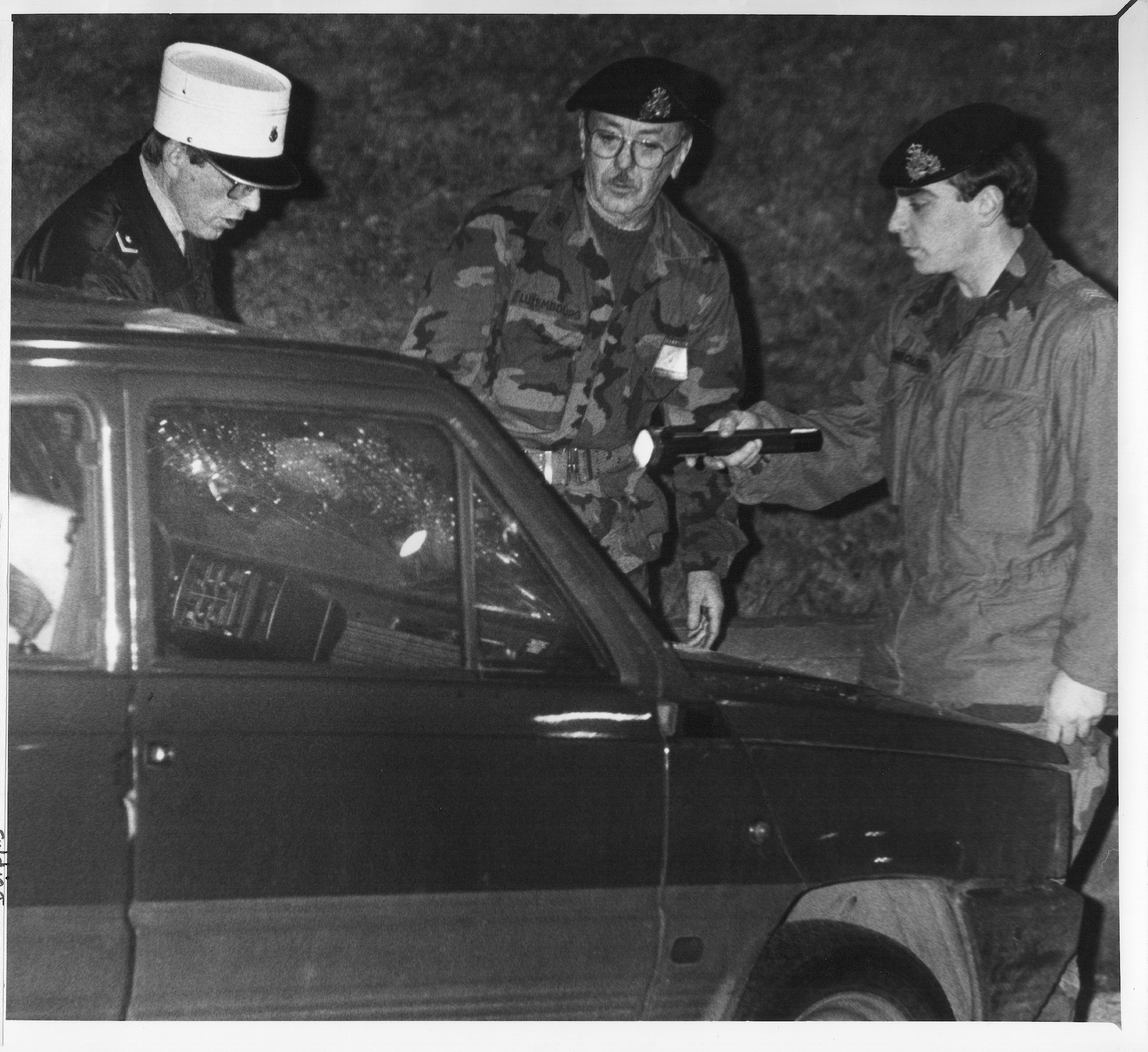
Police and military examine a car damaged when an explosive device was thrown from a passing car in Luxembour in the evening on December 2, 1985. The device landed less than a hundred meters from the Kirchberg centre, where Heads of State from European Community countries were holding a two-day summit.

The perpetrators carried out thefts of detonators and explosives from Luxembourgish quarries. The perpetrators used the stolen materials to blow up electricity pylons from the electricity company Cegedel. The company received multiple ransom letters. The company contacted the police and decided not to pay. Later, once the company had come to a conclusion and decided to pay the ransom, the perpetrators declined the transfer of money, stating that they knew of the police interest surrounding the attacks. Cegedel's electricity pylons remained the target of later attacks. However, the perpetrators diversified the targets of their later attacks to include the headquarters of the Gendarmerie and the Palace of Justice. A particularly significant incident happened during a meeting of the European Council on the Kirchberg plateau. The incident in question involved a small explosive device which was thrown out of the window of a moving car. After two further attacks, one a car bomb at the apartment of a notary, and the apartment of a retired commander of the Gendarmerie, the attacks ceased.

No one was killed in the 18 attacks. However, a young soldier was killed during service by a traffic collision during the surveillance of Luxembourg Airport. The perpetrators also set up an explosive trap in a forest, which was discovered before it could be put to use. This could perhaps have resulted in the death of many people. Furthermore, an engineer’s hand was severely injured when he picked up a torch which had been fitted with a detonator. A number of people were injured as a compromised electricity pylon fell upon a highway, which caused traffic to collide on the highway, though nobody was severely injured. It is believed that the perpetrators wanted to avoid human casualties, though in a number of incidents it was pure chance that no-one was injured.

== Chronology of the attacks ==
- 30 May 1984: Cegedel Electricity Pylon - Beidweiler
- 2 June 1984: Cegedel Electricity Pylon - Beidweiler
- 12 April 1985 – Holiday Home – Bourscheid (No clear relation to the other attacks)
- 27 April 1985 Cegedel Electricity Pylon - Stafelter
- 7 of May 1985: Cegedel Electricity Pylon - Schléiwenhaff
- 27 May 1985: Gendarmerie Headquarters – Verluerekascht, Luxembourg City
- 29 May 1985: Cegedel Electricity Pylon - Itzig
- 23 June 1985: Gasworks in Hollerich, Luxembourg City
- 5 July 1985: Explosive Trap - Blaschette
- 5 July 1985: Casemates – Luxembourg City
- 26 July 1985: Luxemburger Wort – Gasperich, Luxembourg City
- 29 August 1985: Police Office - Glacis, Luxembourg City
- 29 August 1985: Ponts & Chaussées – Glacis, Luxembourg City
- 30 September 1985: Piscine Olympique – Kirchberg, Luxembourg City
- 20 October 1985: Palais de Justice – Luxembourg City
- 9 November 1985: Luxembourg Findel Airport
- 30 November 1985: Cegedel Electricity Pylon - Grünewald
- 2 December 1985. European Council Meeting – Kirchberg, Luxembourg City
- 17 February 1986: Notary Hellinckx – Cents, Luxembourg City
- 25 March 1986: Colonel Wagner – Belair, Luxembourg City
