= 1999–2000 Luxembourg Cup (ice hockey) =

The 1999–00 Luxembourg Cup was the seventh playing of the Luxembourg Cup ice hockey tournament. Five teams participated in the tournament, which was won by Galaxians d'Amneville II.

== Final standings ==
	Club	GP	W	T	L	GF–GA	Pts
1.	(France) Galaxians d'Amnéville II	8	6	0	2	67:27	12
2.	(Luxembourg) Lokomotive Luxemburg	8	6	0	2	50:29	12
3.	(Germany) EHC Trier II	8	4	0	4	49:57	8
4.	(Luxembourg) IHC Beaufort	8	4	0	4	40:49	8
5.	(Luxembourg) Rapids Remich	8	0	0	8	32:76	0
