= Luxembourg Championship (ice hockey) =

Luxembourg Hockey League
- Most recent season or competition: 2021-22
- Sport: Ice hockey
- Founded: 1993
- No. of teams: 4
- Country: Luxembourg
- Most recent champion: Beaufort Knights (1)
- Most titles: Tornado Luxembourg (7 titles)

The Luxembourg Hockey League, formally known as the Luxembourg Championship is the national ice hockey championship in Luxembourg. It was first contested in 1993, and was held annually from 1998-2003. The Alter Domus Cup is the current national competition in Luxembourg.

== Champions ==
- 2021-22: Beaufort Knights
- 2002–03: Tornado Luxembourg
- 2001–02: Tornado Luxembourg
- 2000–01: Tornado Luxembourg
- 1999–2000: Tornado Luxembourg
- 1998–99: Tornado Luxembourg
- 1997–98: Tornado Luxembourg
- 1994-1997: Not played
- 1993–94: Tornado Luxembourg
