= 2001–02 Luxembourg Cup (ice hockey) =

The 2001–02 Luxembourg Cup was the ninth playing of the Luxembourg Cup ice hockey tournament. Five teams participated in the tournament, which was won by EHC Zweibrucken II.

== Final standings ==
| | Club | GP | W | T | L | GF–GA | Pts |
|---|---|---|---|---|---|---|---|
| 1. | (Germany) EHC Zweibrücken II | 8 | 8 | 0 | 0 | 88:25 | 16 |
| 2. | (Luxembourg) Rapids Remich | 8 | 6 | 0 | 2 | 66:25 | 12 |
| 3. | (France) Galaxians d'Amnéville II | 8 | 4 | 0 | 4 | 40:41 | 8 |
| 4. | (Germany) EHC Trier II | 8 | 2 | 0 | 6 | 33:76 | 4 |
| 5. | (Luxembourg) IHC Beaufort | 8 | 0 | 0 | 8 | 4:64 | 0 |
