= 2000–01 Luxembourg Cup (ice hockey) =

The 2000–01 Luxembourg Cup was the eighth playing of the Luxembourg Cup ice hockey tournament. Three teams participated in the tournament, which was won by Galaxians d'Amneville II.

== Final standings ==
	Club	GP	W	T	L	GF–GA	Pts
1.	(France) Galaxians d'Amnéville II	4	2	2	0	27:18	6
2.	(Luxembourg) Rapids Remich	4	1	2	1	17:16	4
3.	(Germany) EHC Trier II	4	1	0	3	22:32	2
