= Schifflange =

Schifflange Schëffleng (Luxembourgish) Schifflingen (German)
- Commune
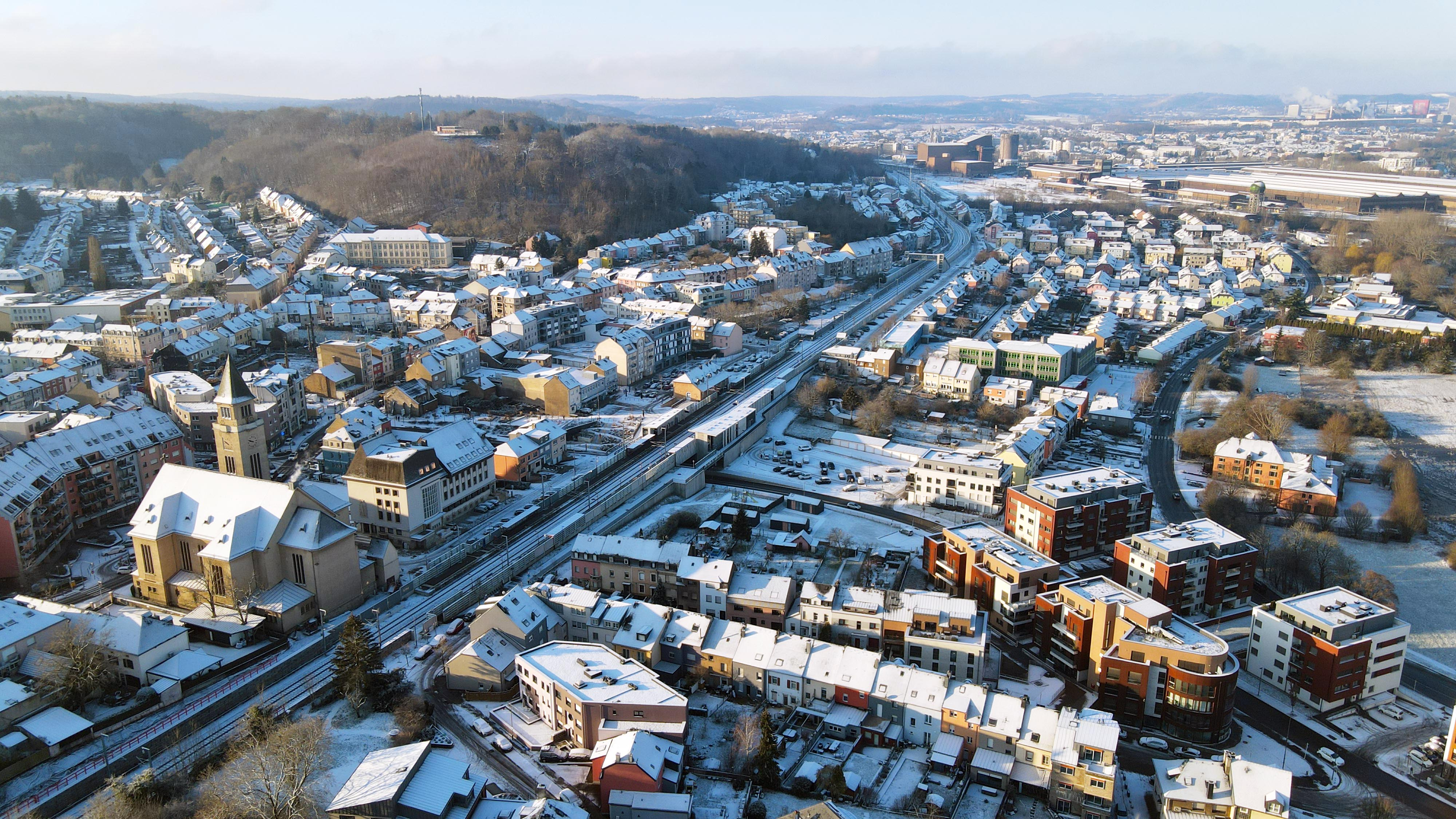
- Aerial view of Schifflange

- Coat of arms

- Map of Luxembourg with Schifflange highlighted in orange, and the canton in dark red
- Coordinates: 49.5056°N 6.0125°E
- Country: Luxembourg
- Canton: Esch-sur-Alzette

Government
  - Mayor: Carlo Feiereisen (LSAP)

Area
  - Total: 7.71 km^{2} (2.98 sq mi)
  - Rank: 99th of 100
- Highest elevation: 406 m (1,332 ft)
  - Rank: 44th of 100
- Lowest elevation: 275 m (902 ft)
  - Rank: 76th of 100

Population (2025)
  - Total: 11,589
  - Rank: 9th of 100
  - Density: 1,500/km^{2} (3,890/sq mi)
  - Rank: 4th of 100
- Time zone: UTC+1 (CET)
  - Summer (DST): UTC+2 (CEST)
- LAU 2: LU0000214
- Website: schifflange.lu

Schifflange (French pronunciation: [ʃiflɑ̃ʒ]; Luxembourgish: Schëffleng [ˈʃəfleŋ], German: Schifflingen [ˈʃɪflɪŋən]) is a commune and town in south-western Luxembourg. It is part of the canton of Esch-sur-Alzette.

As of 2023, the commune has a population of 11,363.

Schifflange was formed on 15 August 1876, when it was detached from the commune of Esch-sur-Alzette. The law forming Schifflange was passed on the 6 July 1876.

== Steelworks ==
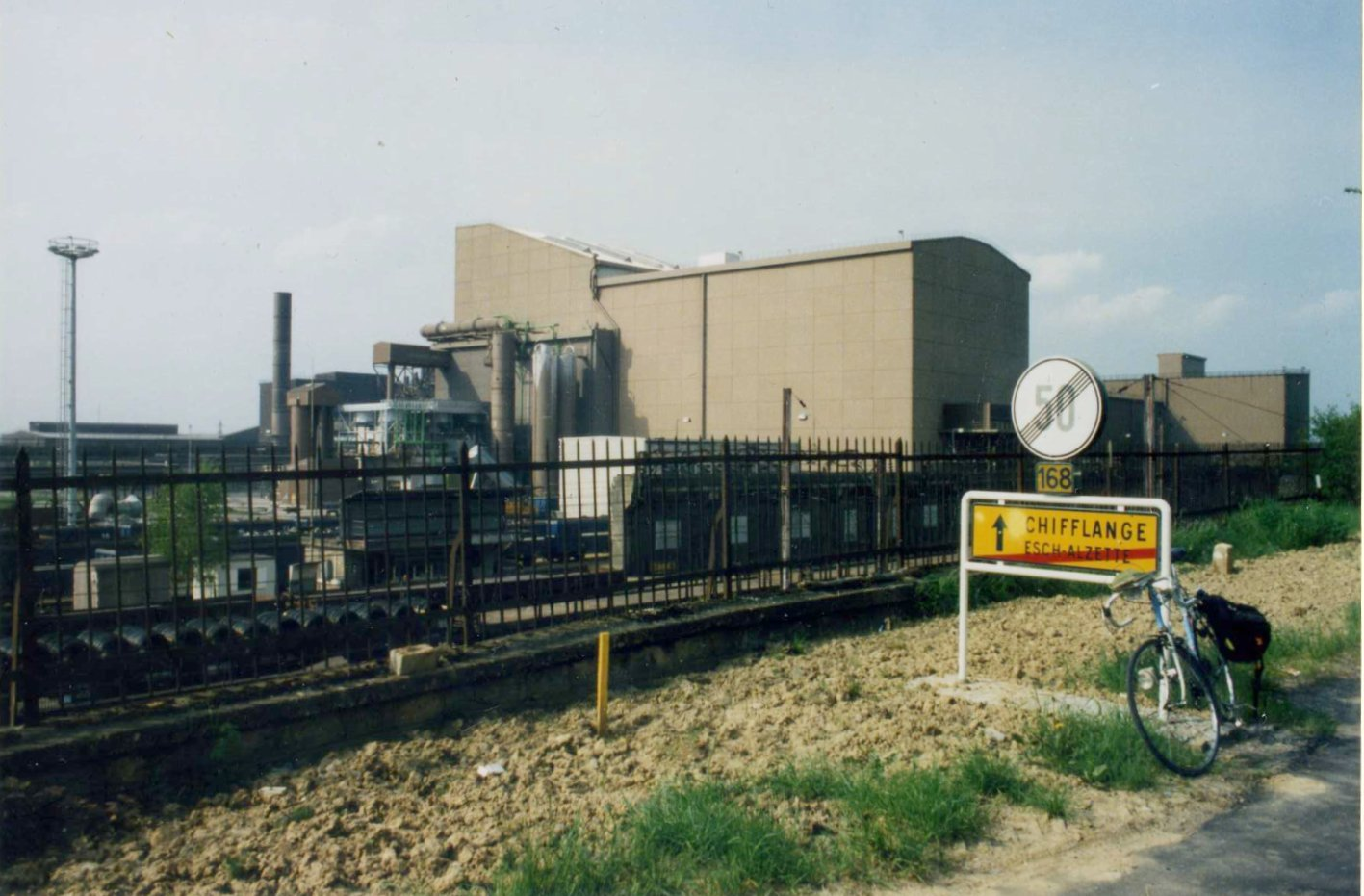
Steelworks, Esch-sur-Alzette, Luxembourg, May 1995

A steelworks in Schifflange was founded in 1871 by the Metz family as Usine METZ (Esch-Schifflange), the steelworks became part of ARBED in 1911. In the 1980s the plant was converted to the continuous casting of blooms, then in the 1990s an electric furnace installed. In 1994 the company merged with the Belgian company Métallurgique et Minière de Rodange-Athus (MMRA) forming ARES (Aciéries Rodange Esch-Schifflange). In the first decade of the 21st century ownership passed from Arcelor to ArcelorMittal, in 2008 becoming ArcelorMittal Rodange and Schifflange S.A. together with the plant in Rodange.

The steelworks shut down in 2012 and were largely demolished starting in 2016. The site is due to be converted into a large mixed-use neighbourhood with housing for 10,000 residents, served by the planned Luxembourg-Esch-sur-Alzette light rail.

== Population ==
Historical population

Year	Pop.	±%
1821	500	—
1851	600	+20.0%
1900	1,249	+108.2%
1910	1,300	+4.1%
1922	3,648	+180.6%
1935	5,371	+47.2%

Year	Pop.	±%
1947	5,124	−4.6%
1960	6,151	+20.0%
1970	6,440	+4.7%
1981	6,620	+2.8%
1990	6,597	−0.3%
2000	7,698	+16.7%

Year	Pop.	±%
2005	8,075	+4.9%
2010	8,540	+5.8%
2015	9,689	+13.5%
2020	11,293	+16.6%
2021	11,291	−0.0%

Source data

== Notable people ==
- Astrid Lulling (born 1929), politician; former Member of the European Parliament, 1965–1974 and 1989–2014
- Jean Spautz (born 1930), politician, former Member of the European Parliament
- Norbert Haupert (born 1940), a retired athlete and currently a politician
- Laura Thorn (Born 2000), represented Luxembourg in the Eurovision Song Contest 2025

=== Sport ===
- Jey Kugeler (1910–1983), gymnast; competed at the 1936, 1948 and the 1952 Summer Olympics
- Gilles Müller (born 1983), an ATP Tour tennis player.
- Miralem Pjanić (born 1990), footballer with FC Schifflange 95.
- Monique Scheier-Schneider (born 1954), secretary of the Luxembourg Ice Hockey Federation.

== Twin towns ==
Schifflange is twinned with:

- Drusenheim, France
