= Frank Schneider (spy) =

Luxembourgish spy

Frank Schneider (born 1970 or 1971) is a fugitive and former spy within the Luxembourgish State Intelligence service.

== Biography ==
Schneider worked at the United States Embassy in Luxembourg before gaining employment at the Service de Renseignement de l'État (SREL).

Until his dismissal in 2008 due to a domestic wiretapping scandal, Schneider was the operational director of the SREL, the intelligence agency of Luxembourg. After his dismissal from SREL in 2008, he headed a private intelligence company.

=== Sandstone & OneCoin ===
Schneider founded the private investigation firm Sandstone S.A. in 2015. Sandstone was hired by the Ruja Ignatova associated OneCoin.

In April 2021, he was arrested by the French police in relation to a fraud case concerning OneCoin in the US. His extradiction was postponed until September of that year. He faces five years in prison in Luxembourg and 40 years in prison in the US.

In 2023, he escaped house arrest and went on the run. In 2024, New Zealand Police seized a property in Wellington and NZ$462,000, both associated with Schneider and believed to be proceeds of a pyramid scheme.

Sandstone has denied press reports that they were preparing a report stating that Daphne Caruana Galizia was assassinated by Russians.
