= Service de Renseignement de l'État =

Luxembourg intelligence agency

- Saint-Louis building at 207–211 Route d’Esch

Agency overview
- Formed: 1960; 66 years ago
- Type: Intelligence
- Jurisdiction: Government of Luxembourg
- Headquarters: 207–211 Route d’Esch, Luxembourg
- Employees: Circa. 80
- Agency executive: Jeanne Schumacher, Executive Director
- Website: https://sre.gouvernement.lu/en.html

The Service de Renseignement de l'État, full name Service de renseignement de l'État du Luxembourg (French pronunciation: [sɛʁvis də ʁɑ̃sɛɲmɑ̃ də leta dy lyksɑ̃buʁ], lit. 'State Intelligence Service of Luxembourg', abbr. SREL), is Luxembourg's homeland intelligence agency. The agency is colloquially known in Luxembourgish as the "Spëtzeldéngscht“ ("Spy Service").

== Purpose ==
The SRE was set up to collect and evaluate data, to deal with threats to Luxembourg, its allies or international organisations based in the country, particularly in regard to critical infrastructure, especially energy and water infrastructure, road infrastructure, and information technology.

The service was restructured in 2004, under pressure from the “war on terror”, created after the terror attacks on 11 September 2001. The restructuring resulted in the legal basis for the creation of an intelligence agency (Loi du 15 juin 2004 portant organisation du Service de Renseignement de l’Etat) to deal with the following threats:

- Preparation and execution of terrorist attacks
- Espionage
- Interference of foreign states in national affairs
- Proliferation of weapons of mass destruction
- Organized crime, provided it is in relation to the threats mentioned above
- Carrying out security checks on persons that come into contact with confidential information by profession (e.g. Government officials, public administration)
- Worldwide surveillance, and decryption of electronic communications

== Leadership ==
Patrick Heck has been the executive director of the SRE since March 1, 2010, and his predecessor Marco Mille held the position from December 17, 2003 to February 28, 2010.

== Bombers affair ==
As part of the legal proceedings regarding a series of unsolved bombings which took place during the mid-1980s, commonly referred to as the Bombers Affair, over the years the dubious practices of the SRE were exposed.

In July 2013 the final report of the commission of enquiry, which was appointed six months beforehand and headed by future Deputy Prime Minister François Bausch, was published. The report placed the political responsibility of the uncontrolled activities of the SRE upon prime minister Jean-Claude Juncker. Juncker had also fallen victim to the practices of the SRE, as in 2007 the then intelligence chief Marco Mille secretly recorded a conversation between himself and Juncker.

Juncker announced new elections on 10 July 2013, following the scandal surrounding the activities of the SRE.

== See also ==
- Frank Schneider
