= Luxembourg Cup (ice hockey) =

National ice hockey cup competition in Luxembourg

Alter Domus Cup
- Sport: Ice hockey
- Founded: 1993
- No. of teams: 5
- Country: Luxembourg
- Most recent champions: Tornado Luxembourg (14th title)
- Most titles: Tornado Luxembourg (14 titles)
- Website: icehockey.lu

The Luxembourg Cup is the national ice hockey cup competition in Luxembourg. It has been known as the Alter Domus Cup since 2010. Prior to 2003, clubs from other countries in the region were allowed to participate in the tournament.

== Champions ==
- 2022-23: Tornado Luxembourg
- 2018-19: Tornado Luxembourg
- 2016–17: Tornado Luxembourg
- 2015–16: Tornado Luxembourg
- 2014–15: Tornado Luxembourg
- 2013–14: Tornado Luxembourg
- 2012–13: Tornado Luxembourg
- 2011–12: Tornado Luxembourg
- 2010–11: Lokomotiv Luxembourg
- 2009–10: not held
- 2008–09: not held
- 2007–08: not held
- 2006–07: Tornado Luxembourg
- 2005–06: not held
- 2004–05: not held
- 2003–04: not held
- 2002–03: Tornado Luxembourg
- 2001–02: (Germany) EHC Zweibrucken 2
- 2000–01: (France) HC Amneville Moselle 2
- 1999–2000: (France) HC Amneville Moselle 2
- 1998–99: Tornado Luxembourg
- 1997–98: (Belgium) IHC Leuven
- 1996–97: Tornado Luxembourg
- 1995–96: Tornado Luxembourg
- 1994–95: (Belgium) IHC Leuven
- 1993–94: Tornado Luxembourg
