= Luxembourg Ice Hockey Federation =

Luxembourg
- Association name: Fédération Luxembourgeoise de Hockey sur Glace
- IIHF Code: LUX
- IIHF membership: March 23, 1912
- President: schneider
- IIHF men's ranking: 43rd

The Luxembourg Ice Hockey Federation (French: Fédération Luxembourgeoise de Hockey sur Glace (FLHG), German: Luxemburgischer Eishockeyverband, Luxembourgish: Lëtzebuerger Äishockeyfederatioun) is the governing body that oversees ice hockey in Luxembourg.

Monique Scheier-Schneider has served as the general secretary of the federation since 1992.

== National teams ==
- Luxembourg national ice hockey team (men)
- Luxembourg men's national junior ice hockey team (under-20)
- Luxembourg men's national under-18 ice hockey team

== 2017 Luxembourg participation ==
| Event | Division | Host nation | Date | Result |
|---|---|---|---|---|
| Men's | Division III | Bulgaria | 10–16 April 2017 | 1st |
