= Cegedel =

Cegedel S.A.
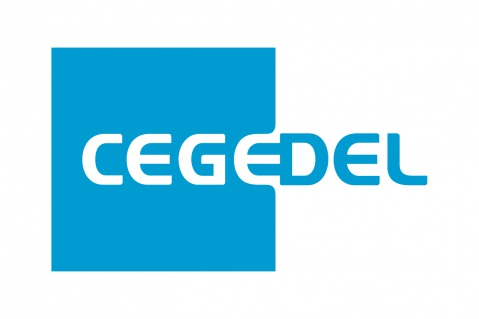
- Company type: Public
- Industry: Electricity distribution
- Founded: 27 March 1928
- Defunct: 2009
- Successor: Creos Luxembourg SA
- Headquarters: 2, rue Thomas Edison, Strassen, Luxembourg
- Area served: Luxembourg
- Key people: Roland Michel, Chairman; Romain Becker, CEO
- Revenue: €331.2m
- Operating income: €73.9m
- Net income: €75.3m
- Number of employees: 500

Cegedel S.A. (until 17 May 1997 the Compagnie Grand-Ducale d'Électricité du Luxembourg (English: Grand Ducal Electricity Company of Luxembourg)), was a Luxembourg company that distributed electricity. It operated under a concession written into the law under which it was formed, and distributed 70% of the electricity used in the country, amounting to 6,616 GWh.

The Government of Luxembourg owned one-third of the company, which made it the largest single shareholder, followed by the 30.4% stake held by Luxempart-Energie, with smaller stakes held by SNCI (12%) and Electrabel (8%). Shares of the company were listed on the Luxembourg Stock Exchange, of which it was one of the ten (and one of the seven Luxembourg-based) members of the main index, the LuxX Index

As a result of the European Union policy of liberalization of the energy market, Enovos Gruppe acquired Cegedel SA along with Soteg SA, the gas distributor, in 2009, and created a Luxembourg subsidiary, Creos Luxembourg, to distribute both gas and electricity.
