= Tornado Luxembourg =

- City: Luxembourg City, Luxembourg
- League: Luxembourg Championship; FFHG Division 2
- Founded: 1987
- Home arena: Kockelscheur Arena
- Colours: blue, red, white and gray
- General manager: Monique Scheier-Schneider
- Head coach: Joakim Eriksson
- Website: https://www.tornadoluxembourg.com/

Tornado Luxembourg is a professional ice hockey team in Luxembourg City. The team sometimes plays in FFHG Division 2. However, they are not eligible for the championship because they are a foreign team.

Tornado also participates in the Luxembourg Championship and the Luxembourg Cup.

== History ==
Tornado Luxembourg debuted in the 1987-88 season, and played in the Rheinland-Palatinat Liga, a German regional league, which they won. They then finished second in the qualification round for the Regionalliga Mitte Group, and thus qualified for the 1988-89 season. They only played in the Regionalliga for the 1988-89 season, as they finished in eighth place in their group, and failed to qualify for the following season.

Prior to 2005, the Tornado played in the Rheinland-Palatinat Liga. Monique Scheier-Schneider negotiated permission to play in the French Division 3. As part of the agreement, the team is eligible for promotion to the top Ligue Magnus tier, but are ineligible to become the French champion and represent France at international competitions for club teams. Schneider commented on the agreement by saying, "I think it's fair since we are already Luxembourg's champion by regularly beating our only competitor, the Beaufort club". Schneider has operated the Tornado as an amateur team which does not play its players, and covers its costs by a sponsorship from Škoda Auto.

In Luxembourg, the club won the Luxembourg Championship seven times between 1994 and 2003, and the Luxembourg Cup eight times; in 1994, 1996, 1997, 1999, 2003, 2007, 2011, and 2012.

During the 2012-2013 forward Colm Cannon became the all-time leading goal scorer of the Tornados.

With there being so few ice hockey players in Luxembourg, there are generally a number of players from Tornado on the national team. Eight players from Tornado Luxembourg played for the national team in 2009.

== Roster ==
=== Forwards ===
Number	Name	Nationality	Height/Weight
10	Benny Welter	Luxembourg	180 cm/80 kg
11	Robert Beran	Luxembourg	180 cm/80 kg
77	Eric Wambach	Luxembourg	185 cm/82 kg
18	Jean-Marie Funk	Luxembourg	172 cm/86 kg
83	Thierry Holtzem	Luxembourg	187 cm/80 kg
42	Steven Minden	Luxembourg	175 cm/70 kg
22	David Donzel	France	179 cm/75 kg
64	Pierre Huther	France	178 cm/84 kg
15	Patrick Schon	Luxembourg	191 cm/83 kg
25	Daniel Androne	Belgium	? cm/? kg
5	Georges Scheier	Luxembourg	180 cm/70 kg
27	Sampsa Jarvenpaa	Finland	187 cm/82 kg
23	Frank Schram	Luxembourg	185 cm/92 kg
9	Jeff Meyer	Luxembourg	182 cm/92 kg
28	Fredrik Olsen	Denmark	? cm/? kg
16	Markus Eriksson	Sweden	? cm/? kg
28	Jani Rautjarvi	Finland	? cm/? kg
4	Agi Ichinorov	Mongolia	169 cm/62 kg
69	Teemu Hinkula	Finland	184 cm/80 kg
20	Michal Loksa	Czech Republic	? cm/? kg

=== Defence ===
Number	Name	Nationality	Height/Weight
14	Ronny Scheier	Luxembourg	180 cm/80 kg
3	Serge Milano	Luxembourg	172 cm/80 kg
12	François Schons	Luxembourg	180 cm/70 kg
7	Rafael Springer	Luxembourg	190 cm/83 kg
17	Kai Linster	Luxembourg	186 cm/82 kg
21	Christophe Hernandez	Luxembourg	178 cm/87 kg
19	Yves Barthels	Luxembourg	190 cm/86 kg
33	Thierry Magalhaes	Luxembourg	184 cm/71 kg
6	Gilles Biever	Luxembourg||? cm/? kg	

=== Goaltenders ===
Number	Name	Nationality	Height/Weight
30	Gilles Mangen	Luxembourg	176 cm/70 kg
1	Yann Livolant	Luxembourg	175 cm/100 kg

== Results ==
=== Germany ===
Rheinland-Palatinat Liga

- 1986-87 1st place
- 1987-88 1st place
- 1989-1990: second place
- 1990-1991: fourth place
- 1991-1992: fourth place
- 1992-1993: second place
- 1997-1998: second place
- 1998-1999: second place
- 2001-2002: second place

=== France ===
FFHG Division 3

- 2007-2008: third place
- 2008-2009: third place in Group H
- 2009-2010: Carry off play-down tournament faced with Asnières 2.
- 2010-2011: seventh place in Group C

=== Luxembourg ===
- Luxembourg Championship winners 2002-03, 2001-02, 2000-01, 1999-00, 1998-99, 1997-98, 1996-97, 1993-94
- Luxembourg Cup winners 2012-13, 2011-12, 2006-07, 2002-03, 1998-99, 1996-97, 1995-95, 1993-94
