= 2020 in ice hockey =

The following were the events of ice hockey for the year 2020 throughout the world. Due to the COVID-19 pandemic, a number of scheduled ice hockey events were cancelled.

== IIHF World Championships ==
2021 World Ice Hockey Divisions for the International Ice Hockey Federation (IIHF) were scheduled to take place between December 9, 2019 and May 3, 2020, though several tournaments were canceled due to the COVID-19 pandemic.

=== IIHF World Women's U18 Championship ===
- December 26, 2019 – January 2: 2020 IIHF World Women's U18 Championship in Bratislava
  - United States defeated Canada, 2–1 in overtime, to win their eighth World Women's U18 Championship title.
  - Russia defeated Finland, 6–1, to win the bronze medal.
  - Slovakia was relegated to Division I – Group A for 2021.

==== Divisions ====
- January 2 – 8: Division I – Group B in Katowice
  - Final Ranking: 1. Norway, 2. Austria, 3. China, 4. South Korea, 5. Poland, 6. Great Britain
  - Norway was promoted to Division I – Group A for 2021.
  - Great Britain was relegated to Division II – Group A for 2021.
- January 3 – 9: Division I – Group A in Füssen
  - Final Ranking: 1. Germany, 2. Japan, 3. Hungary, 4. France, 5. Italy, 6. Denmark
  - Germany was promoted to Top Division for 2021.
  - Denmark was relegated to Division I – Group B for 2021.
- January 25 – 28: Division II – Group A in Eindhoven
  - Final Ranking: 1. Chinese Taipei, 2. Netherlands, 3. Australia, 4. Kazakhstan
  - Chinese Taipei was promoted to Division I – Group B for 2021.
  - Kazakhstan was relegated to Division II – Group B for 2021.
- January 28 – February 2: Division II – Group B in Mexico City
  - Final Ranking: 1. Spain, 2. Turkey, 3. Mexico, 4. New Zealand
  - Spain was promoted to Division II – Group A for 2021.

=== IIHF World U20 Championship (Junior) ===
- December 26, 2019 – January 5: 2020 World Junior Ice Hockey Championships in Ostrava and Třinec
  - Canada defeated Russia, 4–3, to win their 18th World Junior Ice Hockey Championship title.
  - Sweden defeated Finland, 3–2, to win the bronze medal.
  - Kazakhstan was relegated to Division I – Group A for 2021.

==== Divisions ====
- December 9 – 15, 2019: Division I – Group A in Minsk
  - Final Ranking: 1. Austria, 2. Latvia, 3. Belarus, 4. Norway, 5. Denmark, 6. Slovenia
  - Austria was promoted to Top Division for 2021.
  - Slovenia was relegated to Division I – Group B for 2021.
- December 12 – 18, 2019: Division I – Group B in Kyiv
  - Final Ranking: 1. Hungary, 2. France, 3. Ukraine, 4. Poland, 5. Estonia, 6. Italy
  - Hungary was promoted to Division I – Group A for 2021.
  - Italy was relegated to Division II – Group A for 2021.
- January 6 – 12: Division II – Group A in Vilnius
  - Final Ranking: 1. Japan, 2. Great Britain, 3. Lithuania, 4. Romania, 5. Spain, 6. Serbia
  - Japan was promoted to Division I – Group B for 2021.
  - Serbia was relegated to Division II – Group B for 2021.
- January 13 – 19: Division III in Sofia
  - Final Ranking: 1. Iceland, 2. Australia, 3. Turkey, 4. Mexico, 5. Bulgaria, 6. New Zealand, 7. Chinese Taipei, 8. South Africa
  - Iceland was promoted to Division II – Group B for 2021.
- January 28 – February 3: Division II – Group B in Gangneung
  - Final Ranking: 1. South Korea, 2. Netherlands, 3. China, 4. Croatia, 5. Belgium, 6. Israel
  - South Korea was promoted to Division II – Group A for 2021.
  - Israel was relegated to Division III for 2021.

=== IIHF Women's World Championship ===
- March 31 – April 10: ~~2020 IIHF Women's World Championship in Halifax and Truro~~ (Note: The Top Division, Division I, and Division II – Group A tournaments were cancelled due to the COVID-19 pandemic.)

==== Divisions ====
- December 4 – 10, 2019: Division III in Sofia
  - Final Ranking: 1. South Africa, 2. Belgium, 3. Romania, 4. Bulgaria, 5. Lithuania, 6. Hong Kong
  - South Africa was promoted to Division II – Group B for 2021.
- February 23 – 29: Division II – Group B in Akureyri
  - Final Ranking: 1. Australia, 2. Iceland, 3. New Zealand, 4. Turkey, 5. Croatia, 6. Ukraine
  - Ukraine was relegated to Division III for 2021.
  - No teams were promoted to Division II – Group A for 2021 as a result of the cancellation of the 2020 Division II – Group A tournament.
- March 28 – April 3: ~~Division I – Group B in Katowice~~
- March 29 – April 4: ~~Division II – Group A in Jaca~~
- April 12 – 18: ~~Division I – Group A in Angers~~

=== IIHF World U18 Championships ===
- April 16 – 26: ~~2020 IIHF World U18 Championships in Plymouth and Ann Arbor~~ (Note: All tournaments were cancelled due to the COVID-19 pandemic.)

==== Divisions ====
- March 16 – 22: ~~Division III – Group A in Istanbul~~
- March 22 – 28: ~~Division II – Group A in Tallinn~~
- March 23 – 29: ~~Division II – Group B in Sofia~~
- March 29 – April 4: ~~Division III – Group B in Kockelscheuer~~
- April 12 – 18: ~~Division I – Group B in Asiago~~
- April 13 – 19: ~~Division I – Group A in Spišská Nová Ves~~

=== IIHF World Championship ===
- May 8 – 24: ~~2020 IIHF World Championship in Zürich and Lausanne~~

==== Divisions ====
- March 3 – 5: ~~Division IV in Bishkek~~
- April 19 – 25: ~~Division II – Group A in Zagreb~~
- April 19 – 25: ~~Division II – Group B in Reykjavík~~
- April 19 – 25: ~~Division III – Group A in Kockelscheuer~~
- April 20 – 23: ~~Division III – Group B in Cape Town~~
- April 27 – May 3: ~~Division I – Group A in Ljubljana~~
- April 27 – May 3: ~~Division I – Group B in Katowice~~

== National Hockey League (NHL) ==
- October 2, 2019 – March 12: 2019–20 NHL season (Note: Season suspended due to the COVID-19 pandemic.)
  - Presidents' Trophy and Eastern Conference regular-season winners: Boston Bruins
  - Western Conference regular-season winners: St. Louis Blues
  - Art Ross Trophy winner: Leon Draisaitl (Edmonton Oilers)
- October 26, 2019: 2019 Heritage Classic at Mosaic Stadium in Regina
  - The Winnipeg Jets defeated the Calgary Flames, with the score of 2–1 in overtime.
- January 1: 2020 Winter Classic at Cotton Bowl in Dallas
  - The Dallas Stars defeated the Nashville Predators, with the score of 4–2.
- January 25: 2020 All-Star Game at Enterprise Center in St. Louis
  - Elite Women's 3-on-3 Game: The Canadian All-Stars defeated the American All-Stars, with the score of 2–1.
  - All-Star Game: Team Pacific defeated Team Atlantic, with the score of 5–4.
  - All-Star Game MVP: David Pastrňák (Boston Bruins)
  - Accuracy Shooting: Jaccob Slavin (Carolina Hurricanes)
  - Fastest Skater: Mathew Barzal (New York Islanders)
  - Hardest Shot: Shea Weber (Montreal Canadiens)
  - Save Streak: Jordan Binnington (St. Louis Blues)
  - Shooting Stars: Patrick Kane (Chicago Blackhawks)
- February 15: 2020 Stadium Series at Falcon Stadium in Colorado Springs
  - The Los Angeles Kings defeated the Colorado Avalanche, with the score of 3–1.
- June 26 – 27: 2020 NHL entry draft at Bell Centre in Montreal
  - Rescheduled to October 6 – 7 due to the COVID-19 pandemic.
  - #1: Alexis Lafrenière (To the New York Rangers from Rimouski Océanic)
- August 1: NHL resumes play with an expanded 24-team behind-closed-doors playoff tournament.
  - September 24: The Tampa Bay Lightning defeat the Dallas Stars four games to two in the Stanley Cup Finals to win their second Stanley Cup.

== Kontinental Hockey League (KHL) ==
- September 1, 2019 – February 27: 2019–20 KHL season (Note: Playoffs cancelled due to the COVID-19 pandemic.)

== North America ==
=== American Hockey League (AHL) ===
- October 4, 2019 – March 12: 2019–20 AHL season
  - Macgregor Kilpatrick Trophy winners: Milwaukee Admirals

=== ECHL ===
- October 11, 2019 – March 12: 2019–20 ECHL season

=== National Women's Hockey League (NWHL) ===
- October 19, 2019 – March 1: 2019–20 NWHL season (Note: Finals cancelled due to the COVID-19 pandemic.)

=== Canadian Hockey League (CHL) ===
- September 19, 2019 – March 17: 2019–20 QMJHL season
  - Jean Rougeau Trophy winners: Sherbrooke Phoenix
- September 19, 2019 – March 18: 2019–20 OHL season
  - Hamilton Spectator Trophy winners: Ottawa 67's
- September 20, 2019 – March 18: 2019–20 WHL season
  - Scotty Munro Memorial Trophy winners: Portland Winterhawks
- May 22 – 31: ~~2020 Memorial Cup at Prospera Place in Kelowna~~ (Note: Tournament cancelled due to the COVID-19 pandemic.)

=== United States Hockey League (USHL) ===
- September 26, 2019 – March 12: 2019–20 USHL season
  - Anderson Cup winners: Chicago Steel

=== College ===
==== NCAA Division I ====
- March 14 – 22: ~~2020 NCAA National Collegiate Women's Ice Hockey Tournament (Frozen Four at Agganis Arena in Boston)~~
- March 27 – April 11: ~~2020 NCAA Division I Men's Ice Hockey Tournament (Frozen Four at Little Caesars Arena in Detroit)~~

==== U Sports ====
- March 12 – 15: ~~2020 U Sports University Cup Tournament at Scotiabank Centre in Halifax~~

== Europe ==
=== Champions Hockey League ===
- August 29, 2019 – February 4: 2019–20 Champions Hockey League
  - (Sweden) Frölunda HC defeated (Czech Republic) Mountfield HK, 3–1, to win their second consecutive and fourth Champions Hockey League title.
  - (Sweden) Djurgårdens IF and (Sweden) Luleå HF finished in joint third place, as the losing semi-finalists.

=== SM-liiga ===
- September 12, 2019 – March 12: 2019–20 SM-liiga season

=== National League ===
- September 13, 2019 – February 29: 2019–20 National League season

=== Deutsche Eishockey Liga (DEL) ===
- September 13, 2019 – March 10: 2019–20 DEL season

=== Swedish Hockey League (SHL) ===
- September 13, 2019 – March 11: 2019–20 SHL season

=== IIHF Continental Cup ===
- September 20, 2019 – January 12: 2019–20 IIHF Continental Cup
  - Final Ranking: 1. (Denmark) SønderjyskE Ishockey, 2. (United Kingdom) Nottingham Panthers, 3. (Belarus) HC Neman Grodno, 4. (Poland) KS Cracovia

== Asia ==
=== Asia League Ice Hockey (ALIH) ===
- August 31, 2019 – February 16: 2019–20 Asia League Ice Hockey season

=== Southeast Asian Games ===
- December 1 – 8 2019: 2019 Southeast Asian Games in Pasay
  - Thailand defeated Singapore, 8–0, to win their first Southeast Asian Games gold medal.
  - The Philippines defeated Malaysia, 17–1, to win the bronze medal.

=== IIHF Challenge Cup of Asia ===
- April 27 – May 1: ~~2020 IIHF Challenge Cup of Asia in Singapore~~

== Deaths ==
=== January ===
- Terry Gray, 81, Canadian right wing (St. Louis Blues, Los Angeles Kings)
- John Migneault, 70, Canadian right wing (Philadelphia Blazers, Vancouver Blazers, Phoenix Roadrunners)
- Sophie Kratzer, 30, German Olympic forward (2014)
- John Gibson, 60, Canadian defenceman (Winnipeg Jets, Toronto Maple Leafs, Los Angeles Kings)
- Bob Monahan, 91, American defenceman (Michigan Tech Huskies)
- Gunnar Svensson, 64, Swedish forward (Björklöven) and coach (Djurgården, Troja/Ljungby)

=== February ===
- Vilen Prokofyev, 18, Kazakh goaltender (Snezhnye Barsy Astana)
- Alexander Skvortsov, 65, Russian left wing, Olympic champion (1984)
- Ian Cushenan, 86, Canadian defenceman (Montreal Canadiens, Chicago Blackhawks), Stanley Cup champion (1959)
- Brian Glennie, 73, Canadian defenceman (Toronto Maple Leafs, Los Angeles Kings), Olympic bronze medalist (1968)
- Larry Popein, 89, Canadian centre (New York Rangers, Oakland Seals) and coach (Omaha Knights)
- Vladimír Svitek, 57, Slovak right wing
- Pete Babando, 94, Canadian left wing (Detroit Red Wings, Chicago Black Hawks, Boston Bruins), Stanley Cup champion (1950)
- Phil Maloney, 92, Canadian centre (Boston Bruins, Chicago Blackhawks) and coach (Vancouver Canucks)
- Seaver Peters, 87, American player (Dartmouth College)

=== March ===
- Henri Richard, 84, Canadian Hall of Fame centre (Montreal Canadiens), 11-time Stanley Cup champion
- Ken King, 68, Canadian businessman and executive (Calgary Flames)
- Galen Head, 72, Canadian right wing (Detroit Red Wings)
- Werner Lorenz, 83, German defenceman (Adler Mannheim)
- Vladimír Zábrodský, 97, Czech Hall of Fame centre (LTC Prague, HC Sparta Praha, Bohemians 1905), world champion (1947, 1949) and Olympic silver medalist (1948)
- Annar Petersen, 88, Norwegian Olympic player (1952)
- Hassie Young, 96, Canadian centre (Edmonton Mercurys)
- Henry Brabham, 90, American executive, co-founder of the ECHL
- Aleksei Frolikov, 63, Russian right wing (Dynamo Moscow)

=== April ===
- Roger Chappot, 79, Swiss Olympic defenceman (1964)
- John Hughes, 66, Canadian defenceman (Cincinnati Stingers)
- Lars-Eric Lundvall, 86, Swedish left wing (Frölunda), world champion (1962) and Olympic silver medalist (1964)
- Pat Stapleton, 79, Canadian defenceman (Chicago Blackhawks, Boston Bruins)
- Jim Conacher, 98, Scottish-born Canadian centre (New York Rangers, Chicago Black Hawks)
- Tom Webster, 71, Canadian right wing (Detroit Red Wings, New England Whalers) and coach (Los Angeles Kings)
- Colby Cave, 25, Canadian centre (Boston Bruins, Edmonton Oilers)
- Vincenzo Fardella, 93, Italian Olympic player (1948)
- Max Quackenbush, 91, Canadian defenceman (Chicago Blackhawks, Boston Bruins)
- Paul Ronty, 91, Canadian centre (New York Rangers, Boston Bruins)

=== May ===
- Simon Schenk, 73, Swiss coach (national team)
- Jim Cross, 87, American forward and coach (Vermont Catamounts)
- Doug McKay, 90, Canadian left wing (Detroit Red Wings)
- Alexander Gerasimov, 61, Russian player, Olympic champion (1984)
- Peter Schiller, 62, German Olympic player (1988)
- Floyd Hillman, 86, Canadian defenceman (Boston Bruins)
- Cliff Pennington, 80, Canadian centre (1960)
- Wally Gacek, 92, Canadian center (Michigan Wolverines)

=== June ===
- Bob Dupuis, 84, American defenceman (Boston University Terriers)
- Bob Warner, 69, Canadian defenceman (Toronto Maple Leafs)
- Jim Hargreaves, 70, Canadian defenceman (Vancouver Canucks)

=== July ===
- Brent MacNab, 89, Canadian ice hockey player
- Len Cunning, 69, Canadian ice hockey player (Johnstown Jets)
- Robert Mack, 61, Austrian Olympic ice hockey player (1988)
- Bob Sabourin, 87, Canadian ice hockey player (Toronto Maple Leafs)
- Ben Acton, 92, Australian Olympic ice hockey player (1960)
- Donald Whiston, 93, American ice hockey player, Olympic silver medalist (1952)
- Roger Côté, 80, Canadian ice hockey player (Edmonton Oilers, Indianapolis Racers)
- Alexei Tezikov, 42, Russian ice hockey player (Washington Capitals, Vancouver Canucks, HC Lada Togliatti)
- Ray Hannigan, 93, Canadian-born American ice hockey player (Toronto Maple Leafs)
- Jack McIlhargey, 68, Canadian ice hockey player and coach (Vancouver Canucks, Philadelphia Flyers, Hartford Whalers)
- Harry Smith, 85, Canadian ice hockey player
- Alexander Gusev, 73, Russian ice hockey player, Olympic champion (1976)
- Ondřej Buchtela, 20, Czech ice hockey player (Piráti Chomutov, HC Benátky nad Jizerou)
- Eddie Shack, 83, Canadian ice hockey player (Toronto Maple Leafs, New York Rangers, Pittsburgh Penguins), four-time Stanley Cup winner (1962–1964, 1967)
- Vic Ekberg, 88, Australian Olympic ice hockey player
- Bob Wilson, 86, Canadian ice hockey player (Chicago Blackhawks)

=== August ===
- Ralph Klassen, 64, Canadian ice hockey player (St. Louis Blues)
- Mike Yaschuk, 97, Canadian ice hockey player (Saskatoon Quakers, Streatham Redhawks)
- Adam Comrie, 30, Canadian ice hockey player (Rochester Americans, Syracuse Crunch, EC KAC)
- Alfred Püls, 86, Austrian Olympic ice hockey player (1956, 1964)
- Marty Howe, 83, Canadian-born American ice hockey player
- Dale Hawerchuk, 57, Canadian Hall of Fame ice hockey player (Winnipeg Jets, Buffalo Sabres, Philadelphia Flyers) and coach
- Jack Dryburgh, 81, Scottish Hall of Fame ice hockey player (Murrayfield Racers, Nottingham Panthers, Southampton Vikings) and coach
- Bill Burega, 88, Canadian ice hockey player (Toronto Maple Leafs)
- Thomas Imrie, 83, British Hall of Fame ice hockey player (Paisley Pirates, Brighton Tigers, national team)
- Miloš Říha, 61, Czech ice hockey player (Dukla Jihlava, Vítkovice Ridera) and coach (national team)

=== September ===
- Moose Lallo, 95, Canadian ice hockey player (Muskegon Zephyrs, Grand Rapids Rockets, Washington Presidents)
- Terje Steen, 76, Norwegian Olympic ice hockey player (1968, 1972), national team
- František Vaněk, 88, Czech Olympic ice hockey player (1956, 1960)
- Jack Kelley, 93, American ice hockey coach (New England Whalers) and team executive (Pittsburgh Penguins)
- Al Langlois, 85, Canadian ice hockey player (Montreal Canadiens, New York Rangers, Detroit Red Wings), Stanley Cup champion (1958-1960)
- Janez Puterle, 70, Slovenian ice hockey player
- Bob Nevin, 82, Canadian ice hockey player (Toronto Maple Leafs, New York Rangers, Edmonton Oilers), Stanley Cup champion (1962, 1963)
- Erich Romauch, 81, Austrian Olympic ice hockey player (1964)
- George Sayliss, 89, Canadian ice hockey player (East York Lyndhursts)
- Bob Miller, 64, American Olympic ice hockey player (Boston Bruins, Los Angeles Kings, national team)

=== October ===
- Gord Brooks, 70, Canadian ice hockey player (St. Louis Blues, Washington Capitals)
- David Cunningham, 92, Australian Olympic ice hockey player (1960)
- Travis Roy, 45, American ice hockey player (Boston University Terriers)

=== November ===
- Jim Neilson, 78, Canadian ice hockey player (New York Rangers)
- Howie Meeker, 97, Canadian Hall of Fame ice hockey player (Toronto Maple Leafs) and commentator (HNIC), four-time Stanley Cup champion
- Reg Morelli, 84, American-Canadian ice hockey player (North Dakota Fighting Hawks)
- Rick Fraser, 66, Canadian ice hockey player (Indianapolis Racers)
- Michal Šafařík, 43, Slovak ice hockey player (HC Slovan Bratislava)
- Ken Schinkel, 87, Canadian ice hockey player (New York Rangers, Pittsburgh Penguins)
- Nikolai Myshagin, 65, Kazakh ice hockey coach (Metallurg Novokuznetsk, Barys Astana, national team)
- Fred Sasakamoose, 86, Canadian ice hockey player (Chicago Blackhawks)

=== December ===
- Larry Mavety, 78, Canadian ice hockey player (Los Angeles Sharks, Philadelphia Blazers) and coach (Belleville Bulls)
- Neil Armstrong, 87, Canadian Hall of Fame ice hockey linesman
- Cal Hockley, 85, Canadian ice hockey player (Trail Smoke Eaters)
- Artyom Chernov, 38, Russian ice hockey player (HC Vityaz, Metallurg Novokuznetsk)
- Pierre Lacroix, 72, Canadian ice hockey executive, president of the Quebec Nordiques and Colorado Avalanche (1994–2006)
- Seppo Vainio, 83, Finnish Olympic ice hockey player (1960)
- Charlie Brooker, 88, Canadian ice hockey player, Olympic bronze medalist (1956)
- Art Berglund, 80, American ice hockey coach and executive (national team)
- Erkki Hytönen, 87, Finnish Olympic ice hockey player (1952)

== See also ==
- 2021 in ice hockey
- 2020 in sports
