= 2019 Men's Ice Hockey World Championships =

2019 edition of the Men's World Ice Hockey Championships

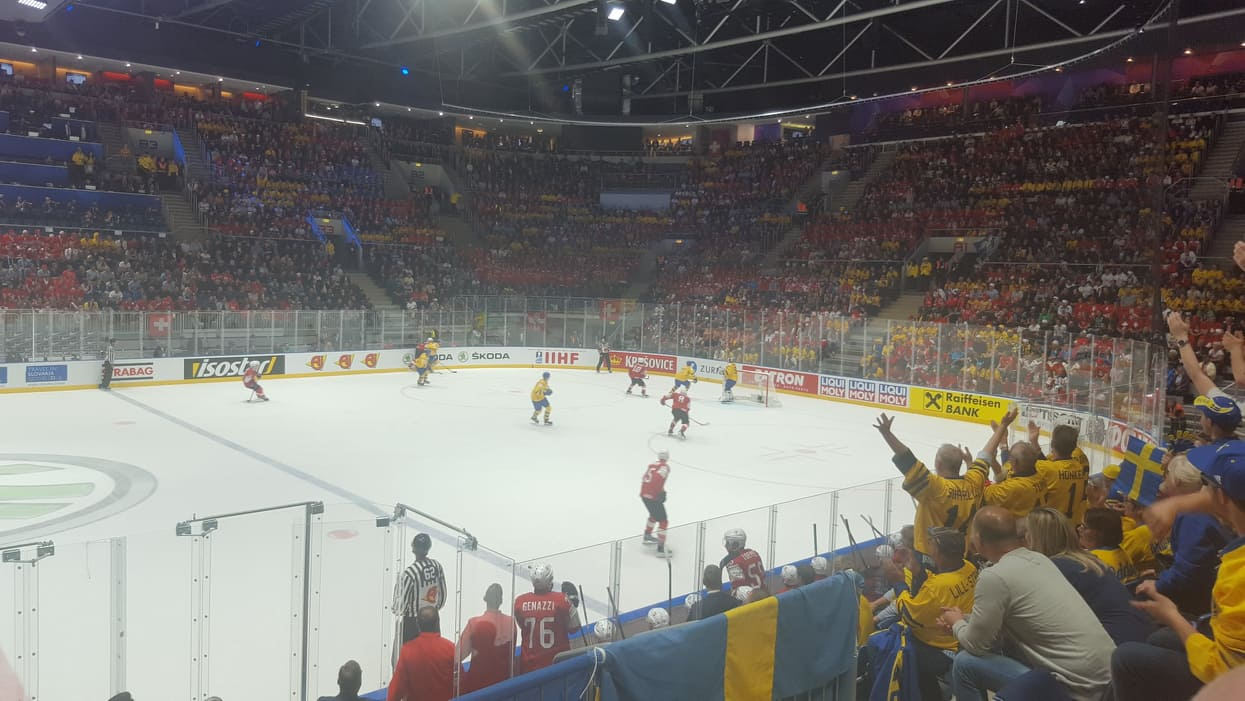

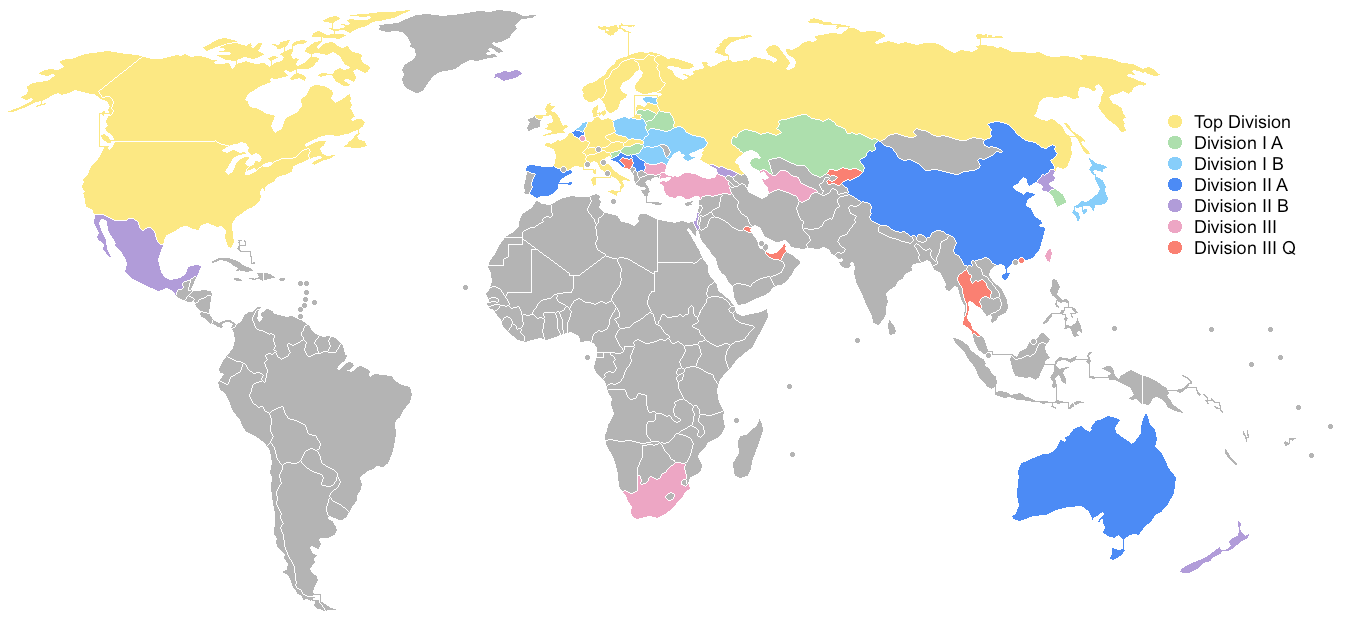
Participating nations in the 2019 IIHF World Championship, by Division.

The 2019 Men's Ice Hockey World Championships was the 83rd such event hosted by the International Ice Hockey Federation (IIHF). Teams participated at several levels of competition. The competition also served as qualifications for division placements in the 2020 competition. Two national teams, Kyrgyzstan and Thailand, made their debut in the World Championships.

== Championship (Top Division) ==
The tournament was held in Bratislava and Košice, Slovakia from 10 to 26 May 2019.

Participants in the tournament were 14 teams continuing from the 2018 Championship tournament, as well as Great Britain and Italy, promoted from the 2018 Division I-A tournament.

Finland won the tournament's gold medal, followed by silver medalist Canada and bronze medalist Russia. This was Finland's first gold medal since 2011. Austria and France each finished last in their group and were relegated to the 2020 Division I-A tournament.

Pos	Grp	Team	Pld	W	OTW	OTL	L	GF	GA	GD	Pts	Final result
1	A	Finland	10	7	1	1	1	31	16	+15	24	Champions
2	A	Canada	10	7	1	0	2	47	15	+32	23	Runners-up
3	B	Russia	10	8	1	0	1	43	14	+29	26	Third place
4	B	Czech Republic	10	7	0	1	2	47	23	+24	22	Fourth place
5	B	Sweden	8	5	0	1	2	45	26	+19	16	Eliminated in Quarter-finals
6	A	Germany	8	5	0	0	3	19	23	−4	15	Eliminated in Quarter-finals
7	A	United States	8	4	1	0	3	30	19	+11	14	Eliminated in Quarter-finals
8	B	Switzerland	8	4	0	1	3	29	17	+12	13	Eliminated in Quarter-finals
9	A	Slovakia (H)	7	3	1	0	3	28	19	+9	11	Eliminated in Group stage
10	B	Latvia	7	3	0	0	4	21	20	+1	9	Eliminated in Group stage
11	A	Denmark	7	1	1	1	4	18	23	−5	6	Eliminated in Group stage
12	B	Norway	7	2	0	0	5	19	33	−14	6	Eliminated in Group stage
13	A	Great Britain	7	0	1	0	6	9	41	−32	2	Eliminated in Group stage
14	B	Italy	7	0	1	0	6	5	48	−43	2	Eliminated in Group stage
15	A	France	7	0	0	2	5	14	34	−20	2	2020 IIHF World Championship Division I
16	B	Austria	7	0	0	1	6	9	40	−31	1	2020 IIHF World Championship Division I

Source: IIHF
Rules for classification: 1) position in the group; 2) number of points; 3) goal difference; 4) goals scored; 5) seeding before tournament.
(H) Host

== Division I ==
=== Group A ===
The Group A tournament was held in Nur-Sultan, Kazakhstan from 29 April to 5 May 2019.

Participants in the tournament were Belarus and South Korea, relegated from the 2018 Championship tournament; Hungary, Kazakhstan, and Slovenia, continuing from the 2018 Division I-A tournament; and Lithuania, promoted from the 2018 Division I-B tournament.

Kazakhstan won the tournament and was promoted to the 2020 Championship tournament, along with second-place finishers Belarus. Lithuania was relegated to the 2020 Division I-B tournament based on their head-to-head record after finishing level on points with Hungary.

Pos	Team	Pld	W	OTW	OTL	L	GF	GA	GD	Pts	Qualification or relegation
1	Kazakhstan (H, P)	5	4	1	0	0	16	7	+9	14	2020 IIHF World Championship
2	Belarus (P)	5	3	0	1	1	14	12	+2	10	2020 IIHF World Championship
3	South Korea	5	3	0	0	2	16	11	+5	9	
4	Slovenia	5	2	0	0	3	21	12	+9	6	
5	Hungary	5	1	0	0	4	7	18	−11	3 (Note: Lithuania 1–4 Hungary)	
6	Lithuania (R)	5	1	0	0	4	7	21	−14	3	Relegation to 2020 Division I B

Source: IIHF
Rules for classification: 1) points; 2) head-to-head points; 3) head-to-head goal difference; 4) head-to-head number of goals scored; 5) result against closest best-ranked team outside tied teams; 6) result against second-best ranked team outside tied teams; 7) seeding before tournament.
(H) Host; (P) Promoted; (R) Relegated

=== Group B ===
The Group B tournament was held in Tallinn, Estonia from 28 April to 4 May 2019.

Participants in the tournament were Poland, relegated from the 2018 Division I-A tournament; Estonia, Japan, Romania, and Ukraine, continuing from the 2018 Division I-B tournament; and the Netherlands, promoted from the 2018 Division II-A tournament.

Romania was promoted to the 2020 Division I-A tournament, advancing based on their head-to-head record after finishing level on points with Poland. The Netherlands were relegated to the 2020 Division II-A tournament.

Pos	Team	Pld	W	OTW	OTL	L	GF	GA	GD	Pts	Qualification or relegation
1	Romania (P)	5	3	2	0	0	18	9	+9	13 (Note: Poland 2–3 (OT) Romania)	Promotion to 2020 Division I A
2	Poland	5	4	0	1	0	27	13	+14	13	
3	Japan	5	2	0	0	3	16	17	−1	6 (Note: Japan 5–2 Estonia)	
4	Estonia (H)	5	1	1	1	2	15	16	−1	6	
5	Ukraine	5	1	0	1	3	17	20	−3	4	
6	Netherlands (R)	5	1	0	0	4	7	25	−18	3	Relegation to 2020 Division II A

Source: IIHF
Rules for classification: 1) points; 2) head-to-head points; 3) head-to-head goal difference; 4) head-to-head number of goals scored; 5) result against closest best-ranked team outside tied teams; 6) result against second-best ranked team outside tied teams; 7) seeding before tournament.
(H) Host; (P) Promoted; (R) Relegated

== Division II ==
=== Group A ===
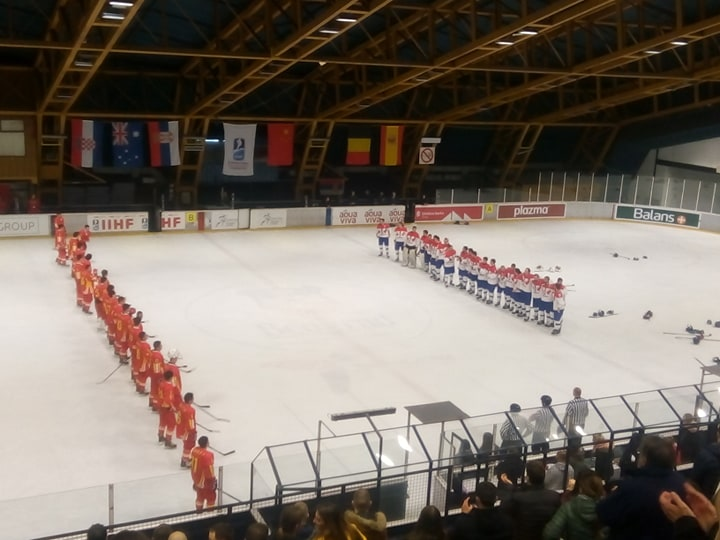
China - Serbia

The Group A tournament was held in Belgrade, Serbia from 9 to 15 April 2019.

Participants in the tournament were Croatia, relegated from the 2018 Division I-B tournament; Australia, Belgium, China, and Serbia, continuing from the 2018 Division II-A tournament; and Spain, promoted from the 2018 Division II-B tournament.

Serbia was promoted to the 2020 Division I-B tournament, advancing based on their head-to-head record after finishing level on points with Croatia. Belgium was relegated to the 2020 Division II-B tournament.

Pos	Team	Pld	W	OTW	OTL	L	GF	GA	GD	Pts	Qualification or relegation
1	Serbia (H, P)	5	3	1	0	1	20	14	+6	11 (Note: Serbia 3–1 Croatia)	Promotion to 2020 Division I B
2	Croatia	5	3	1	0	1	19	9	+10	11	
3	Australia	5	3	0	1	1	14	10	+4	10	
4	Spain	5	2	0	2	1	14	16	−2	8	
5	China	5	1	0	0	4	14	21	−7	3	
6	Belgium (R)	5	0	1	0	4	11	22	−11	2	Relegation to 2020 Division II B

Source: IIHF
Rules for classification: 1) points; 2) head-to-head points; 3) head-to-head goal difference; 4) head-to-head number of goals scored; 5) result against closest best-ranked team outside tied teams; 6) result against second-best ranked team outside tied teams; 7) seeding before tournament.
(H) Host; (P) Promoted; (R) Relegated

=== Group B ===
The Group B tournament was held in Mexico City, Mexico from 21 to 27 April 2019.

Participants in the tournament were Iceland, relegated from the 2018 Division II-A tournament; Israel, Mexico, New Zealand, and North Korea, continuing from the 2018 Division II-B tournament; and Georgia, promoted from the 2018 Division III tournament.

Israel won the tournament and was promoted to the 2020 Division II-A tournament. North Korea was relegated to the 2020 Division III tournament, which was later re-designated as the 2020 Division III-A tournament following re-structuring by the IIHF.

Pos	Team	Pld	W	OTW	OTL	L	GF	GA	GD	Pts	Qualification or relegation
1	Israel (P)	5	4	1	0	0	32	16	+16	14	Promotion to 2020 Division II A
2	Iceland	5	3	0	0	2	26	15	+11	9 (Note: Iceland 4–2 New Zealand)	
3	New Zealand	5	3	0	0	2	26	18	+8	9	
4	Georgia	5	2	0	0	3	18	27	−9	6	
5	Mexico (H)	5	1	0	1	3	17	25	−8	4	
6	North Korea (R)	5	1	0	0	4	19	37	−18	3	Relegation to 2020 Division III A

Source: IIHF
Rules for classification: 1) points; 2) head-to-head points; 3) head-to-head goal difference; 4) head-to-head number of goals scored; 5) result against closest best-ranked team outside tied teams; 6) result against second-best ranked team outside tied teams; 7) seeding before tournament.
(H) Host; (P) Promoted; (R) Relegated

== Division III ==
The Division III tournament was held in Sofia, Bulgaria from 22 to 28 April 2019.

Participants in the tournament were Luxembourg, relegated from the 2018 Division II-B tournament; Bulgaria, Chinese Taipei, South Africa, and Turkey, continuing from the 2018 Division III tournament; and Turkmenistan, promoted from the 2018 Division III qualification tournament.

Bulgaria won the tournament and was promoted to the 2020 Division II-B tournament. South Africa relegated to the 2020 Division III qualification tournament, which was later re-designated as the 2020 Division III-B tournament following re-structuring by the IIHF.

Pos	Team	Pld	W	OTW	OTL	L	GF	GA	GD	Pts	Qualification or relegation
1	Bulgaria (H, P)	5	5	0	0	0	39	7	+32	15	Promotion to 2020 Division II B
2	Turkey	5	3	0	0	2	21	17	+4	9	
3	Turkmenistan	5	2	0	1	2	21	21	0	7	
4	Luxembourg	5	2	0	0	3	15	20	−5	6	
5	Chinese Taipei	5	1	1	0	3	23	35	−12	5	
6	South Africa (R)	5	1	0	0	4	18	37	−19	3	Relegation to 2020 Division III B

Source: IIHF
Rules for classification: 1) points; 2) head-to-head points; 3) head-to-head goal difference; 4) head-to-head number of goals scored; 5) result against closest best-ranked team outside tied teams; 6) result against second-best ranked team outside tied teams; 7) seeding before tournament.
(H) Host; (P) Promoted; (R) Relegated

=== Qualification tournament ===
The Division III qualification tournament was held in Abu Dhabi, United Arab Emirates from 31 March to 6 April 2019.

Participants in the tournament were Hong Kong, relegated from the 2018 Division III tournament; Bosnia and Herzegovina, Kuwait, and the United Arab Emirates, continuing from the 2018 Division III qualification tournament; and first-time competitors Kyrgyzstan and Thailand.

The United Arab Emirates were promoted to the 2020 Division III tournament, which was later re-designated as the 2020 Division III-A tournament following re-structuring by the IIHF. The United Arab Emirates advanced based on their head-to-head record after finishing level on points with Hong Kong.

After winning their first four games 14–0, 6–2, 14–3, and 8–3, Kyrgyzstan was found to have fielded an ineligible player and those results were changed to 0–5 forfeits.

The re-structuring of Division III announced by the IIHF after this tournament saw 2020's Division III re-branded as Division III-A, and the Division III qualification tournament replaced with a Division III-B tournament and a Division IV tournament, both with four teams. The teams that placed second (Hong Kong), third (Thailand), and fourth (Bosnia and Herzegovina) in this tournament were assigned to the 2020 Division III-B tournament. The teams that placed fifth (Kuwait) and sixth (Kyrgyzstan) were assigned to the 2020 Division IV tournament along with newcomers Malaysia and the Philippines.

Pos	Team	Pld	W	OTW	OTL	L	GF	GA	GD	Pts	Qualification or relegation
1	United Arab Emirates (H, P)	5	4	0	0	1	46	14	+32	12 (Note: United Arab Emirates 11–1 Hong Kong)	Promotion to 2020 Division III
2	Hong Kong	5	4	0	0	1	31	18	+13	12	
3	Thailand	5	2	1	0	2	26	19	+7	8	
4	Bosnia and Herzegovina	5	2	0	1	2	21	22	−1	7	
5	Kuwait	5	1	0	0	4	9	43	−34	3 (Note: Kyrgyzstan 0–5 (forfeit) Kuwait)	Later assigned to 2020 Division IV
6	Kyrgyzstan	5	1	0	0	4	7	24	−17	3	Later assigned to 2020 Division IV

Source: IIHF
Rules for classification: 1) points; 2) head-to-head points; 3) head-to-head goal difference; 4) head-to-head number of goals scored; 5) result against closest best-ranked team outside tied teams; 6) result against second-best ranked team outside tied teams; 7) seeding before tournament.
(H) Host; (P) Promoted
