= 2019 World Ice Hockey Championships =

2019 World Ice Hockey Championships may refer to:

- 2019 Men's World Ice Hockey Championships
- 2019 IIHF World Championship
- 2019 World Junior Ice Hockey Championships
- 2019 IIHF World U18 Championships
