= IJssportcentrum Tilburg =

Sports complex for ice skating

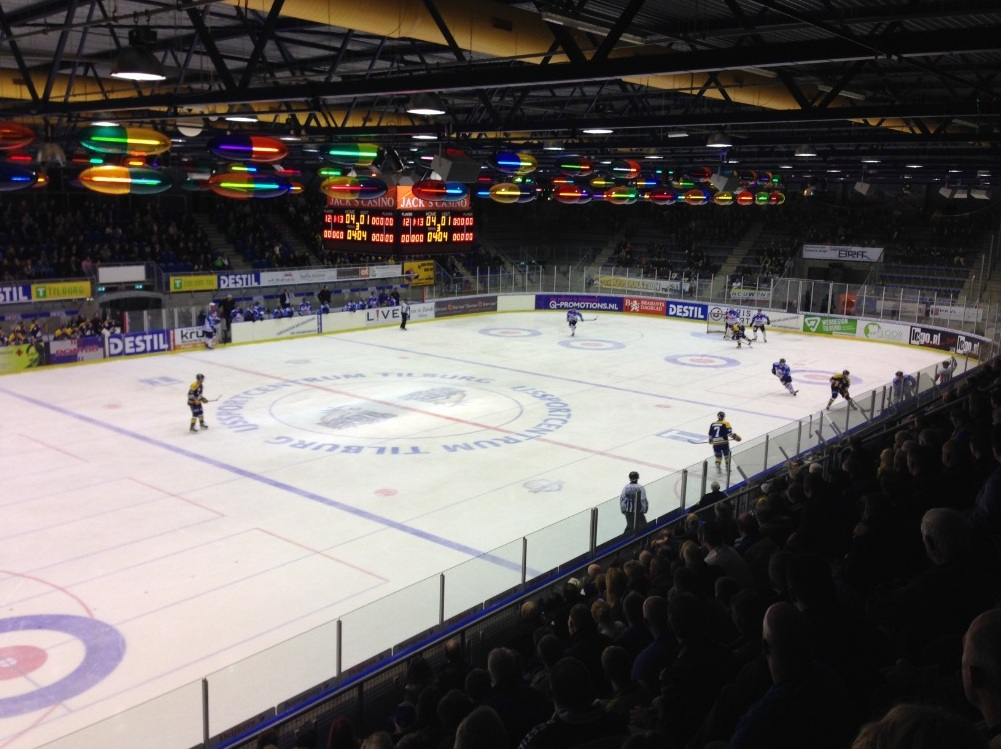
- IJssportcentrum Tilburg in 2013
- Interactive map of IJssportcentrum Tilburg
- Address: Stappegoorlaan 3 Tilburg; Netherlands
- Coordinates: 51.542354°N 5.07487°E
- Owner: Tilburg Municipality
- Capacity: 2500

Construction
- Opened: 12 September 1998

IJssportcentrum Tilburg is a sports complex for ice skating in Tilburg, the Netherlands. The facility, opened in 1998, is owned by the Tilburg municipality and managed through its department Sportbedrijf Tilburg. The complex hosts the Tilburg Trappers, a professional ice hockey club. It was the venue for international championships in ice hockey, figure skating and short track speed skating. In 2009 opened the Irene Wūst ijsbaan, an indoor long-track speed skating facility next to the ice hockey arena, owned by the same municipality.

== History ==
The project of a new ice hockey arena, in replacement of the obsolete Pellikaanhal, was approved by the Tilburg municipality in 1996. The arena for ice hockey, simply called IJssportcentrum, Centre for Ice Sports, opened in the Stappegoor neighbourhood in Tilburg Zuid in September 1998.

The name IJssportcentrum, sometimes also called IJssportcentrum Stappegoor, after the name of the neighbourhood where it is located, refers specifically to the arena for ice hockey. It is part of the next-door Irene Wūst IJsbaan, a long-track speed skating facility opened in 2009.

In 2023, Royal Bam Group intervened the 7,670 square metres (11,890,000 sq in) building to make it more sustainable.

== Sports ==
=== Ice hockey ===
IJssportcentrum Tilburg is home to the Tilburg Trappers, a professional ice hockey club fifteen times Dutch national champion, playing in the third-tier German Oberliga.

=== Figure skating ===
IJssportcentrum Tilburg hosts annually the Dutch Figure Skating Championships, in combination with the international Challenge Cup.

== Events ==
IJssportcentrum Tilburg has hosted the following international events:

=== Ice hockey ===
- 2010 IIHF World Championship Division I
- 2018 IIHF World Championship Division II

=== Figure skating ===
- International Challenge Cup

=== Short-track speed skating ===
- 2024–25 ISU Short Track World Tour, stage 5
- 2026 European Short Track Speed Skating Championships
