= 2021 IIHF World Championship Division III =

International ice hockey tournament

Tournament details
- Host countries: Luxembourg; South Africa
- Venues: 2 (in 2 host cities)
- Dates: 18–24 April (cancelled); 19–25 April (cancelled)
- Teams: 10

The 2021 IIHF World Championship Division III was scheduled to be an international ice hockey tournament run by the International Ice Hockey Federation.

The Group A tournament would have been held in Kockelscheuer, Luxembourg from 18 to 24 April and the Group B tournament in Cape Town, South Africa from 19 to 25 April 2021.

On 18 November 2020, both tournaments were cancelled due to the COVID-19 pandemic.

== Group A tournament ==
2021 IIHF World Championship Division III A
Tournament details
- Host country: Luxembourg
- Venue: 1 (in 1 host city)
- Dates: 18–24 April (cancelled)
- Teams: 6

=== Participants ===
Team	Qualification
North Korea	Placed 6th in Division II B previous year and was relegated.
Turkey	Placed 2nd in Division III previous year.
Turkmenistan	Placed 3rd in Division III previous year.
Luxembourg	Host, placed 4th in Division III previous year.
Chinese Taipei	Placed 5th in Division III previous year.
United Arab Emirates	Placed 1st in Division III Q previous year and was promoted.

=== Standings ===
Pos	Team	Pld	W	OTW	OTL	L	GF	GA	GD	Pts	Qualification or relegation
1	North Korea	0	0	0	0	0	0	0	0	0	Promotion to 2022 Division III B
2	Turkey	0	0	0	0	0	0	0	0	0	
3	Turkmenistan	0	0	0	0	0	0	0	0	0	
4	Luxembourg (H)	0	0	0	0	0	0	0	0	0	
5	Chinese Taipei	0	0	0	0	0	0	0	0	0	
6	United Arab Emirates	0	0	0	0	0	0	0	0	0	Relegation to 2022 Division III B

Rules for classification: 1) points; 2) head-to-head points; 3) head-to-head goal difference; 4) head-to-head number of goals scored; 5) result against closest best-ranked team outside tied teams; 6) result against second-best ranked team outside tied teams; 7) seeding before tournament.
(H) Host

== Group B tournament ==
2021 IIHF World Championship Division III B
Tournament details
- Host country: South Africa
- Venue: 1 (in 1 host city)
- Dates: 19–25 April (cancelled)
- Teams: 4

=== Participants ===
Team	Qualification
South Africa	Host, placed 6th in Division III previous year and was relegated.
Hong Kong	Placed 2nd in Division III Q previous year.
Thailand	Placed 3rd in Division III Q previous year.
Bosnia and Herzegovina	Placed 4th in Division III Q previous year.

=== Standings ===
Pos	Team	Pld	W	OTW	OTL	L	GF	GA	GD	Pts	Qualification or relegation
1	South Africa (H)	0	0	0	0	0	0	0	0	0	Promotion to 2022 Division III A
2	Hong Kong	0	0	0	0	0	0	0	0	0	
3	Thailand	0	0	0	0	0	0	0	0	0	
4	Bosnia and Herzegovina	0	0	0	0	0	0	0	0	0	Relegation to 2022 Division IV

Rules for classification: 1) points; 2) head-to-head points; 3) head-to-head goal difference; 4) head-to-head number of goals scored; 5) result against closest best-ranked team outside tied teams; 6) result against second-best ranked team outside tied teams; 7) seeding before tournament.
(H) Host
