= 2018 IIHF World Championship Division II =

Tournament details
- Host countries: Netherlands; Spain
- Venues: 2 (in 2 host cities)
- Dates: 23–29 April (Group A); 14–20 April (Group B)
- Teams: 12

The 2018 IIHF World Championship Division II was an international ice hockey tournament run by the International Ice Hockey Federation. Group A was contested in Tilburg, Netherlands from 23 to 29 April 2018 and Group B in Granada, Spain from 14 to 20 April 2018.

The Netherlands were promoted to Division I B and Iceland was relegated to Group B. Spain claimed the top position in the Group B tournament and returned to Group A after one year, while Luxembourg took the reverse route after being relegated to Division III.

== Group A tournament ==
2018 IIHF World Championship Division II A

Tournament details
- Host country: Netherlands
- Venue: 1 (in 1 host city)
- Dates: 23–29 April
- Teams: 6

Tournament statistics
- Games played: 15
- Goals scored: 105 (7 per game)
- Attendance: 11,758 (784 per game)
- Scoring leader: (Netherlands) Ivy van den Heuvel (11 points)

Official website
- IIHF.com

=== Participants ===
Team	Qualification
Netherlands	Host, placed 6th in Division I B last year and were relegated.
Australia	Placed 2nd in Division II A last year.
Serbia	Placed 3rd in Division II A last year.
Belgium	Placed 4th in Division II A last year.
Iceland	Placed 5th in Division II A last year.
China	Placed 1st in Division II B last year and were promoted.

=== Match officials ===
4 referees and 7 linesmen were selected for the tournament.

Referees

- (Italy) Andrea Benvegnu
- (Hungary) Miklós Haszonits
- (Russia) Sergey Morozov
- (Poland) Tomasz Radzik

Linesmen

- (Norway) Knut Einar Bråten
- (Croatia) Tomislav Grozaj
- (Latvia) Raivis Jučers
- (Japan) Kensuke Kanazawa
- (Netherlands) Jos Korte
- (United States) Ian McCambridge
- (Netherlands) Stef Oosterling

=== Standings ===
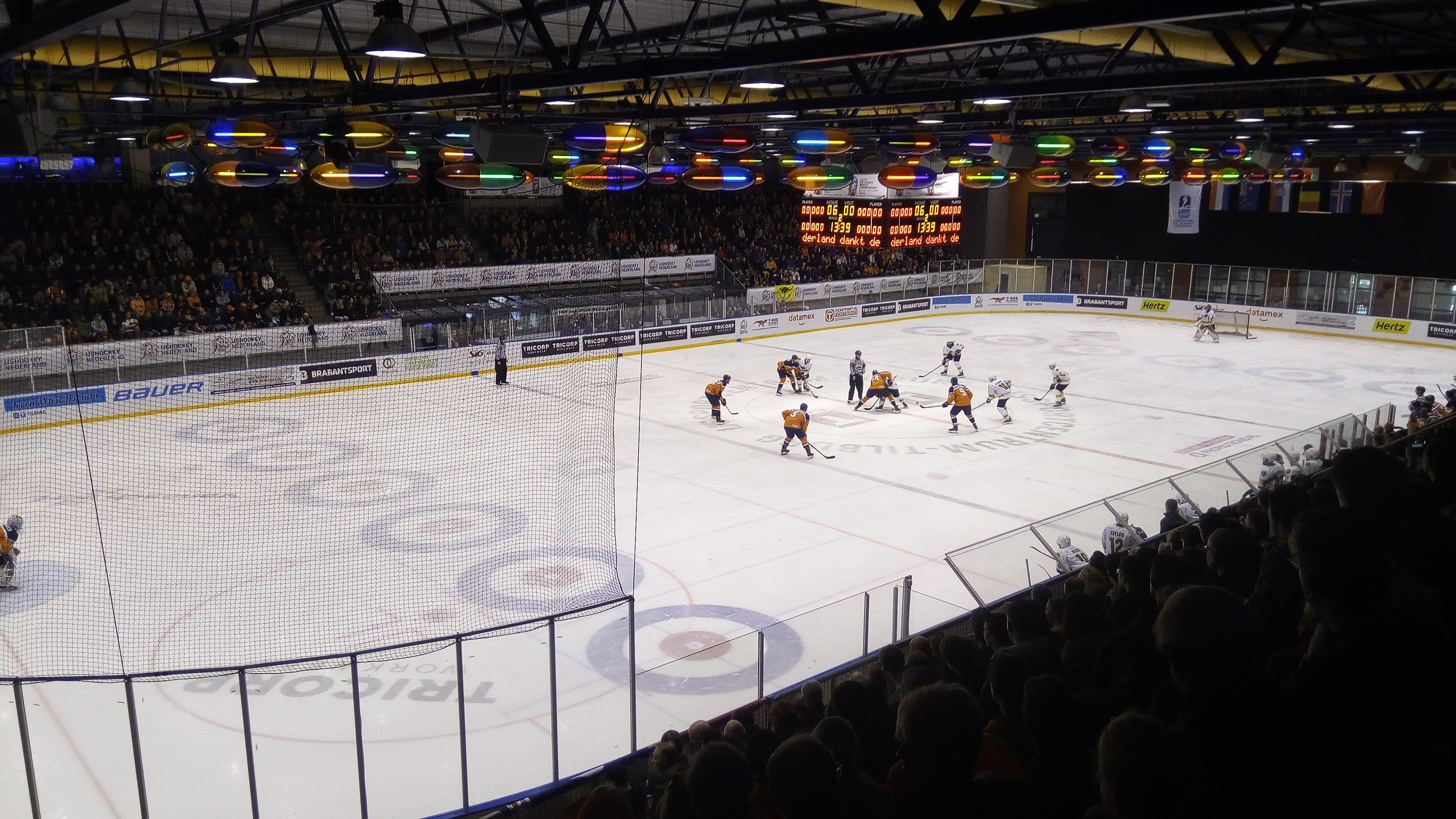
Netherlands - Australia

Pos	Team	Pld	W	OTW	OTL	L	GF	GA	GD	Pts	Qualification or relegation
1	Netherlands (H, P)	5	5	0	0	0	42	5	+37	15	Promoted to Division I B
2	Australia	5	3	1	0	1	19	14	+5	11	
3	Serbia	5	3	0	1	1	16	14	+2	10	
4	China	5	2	0	0	3	10	16	−6	6	
5	Belgium	5	1	0	0	4	11	28	−17	3	
6	Iceland (R)	5	0	0	0	5	7	28	−21	0	Relegation to Division II B

Source: IIHF
Rules for classification: 1) points; 2) head-to-head points; 3) head-to-head goal difference; 4) head-to-head number of goals scored; 5) result against closest best-ranked team outside tied teams; 6) result against second-best ranked team outside tied teams; 7) seeding before tournament.
(H) Host; (P) Promoted; (R) Relegated

=== Results ===
All times are local (UTC+2).

23 April 2018; 13:00	Australia	3–0 (1–0, 0–0, 2–0)	Iceland	IJssportcentrum Tilburg; Attendance: 250

Game reference

Anthony Kimlin
Goalies
Dennis Hedström
Referee:
(Hungary) Miklós Haszonits
Linesmen:
(Japan) Kensuke Kanazawa
(Netherlands) Stef Oosterling

Goransson (Armstrong, Haselhurst) – 17:03	1–0
Malloy (Darge) (PP) – 58:52	2–0
Powell (Cliff) (ENG) – 59:37	3–0

8 min
Penalties
16 min
39
Shots
20

23 April 2018; 16:30	Serbia	4–1 (1–0, 2–1, 1–0)	Belgium	IJssportcentrum Tilburg; Attendance: 215

Game reference

Arsenije Ranković
Goalies
Mike Jansen
Referee:
(Russia) Sergey Morozov
Linesmen:
(Latvia) Raivis Jučers
(Netherlands) Jos Korte

P. Novaković (Luković) (PP2) – 14:46	1–0
Kerezović (Luković) – 21:11	2–0
	2–1	30:41 – Denis (McCann-Coppens)
Sretović (P. Novaković) (PP) – 38:41	3–1
P. Novaković (Crnogorac, Luković) (PP) – 52:43	4–1

12 min
Penalties
14 min
31
Shots
33

23 April 2018; 20:00	Netherlands	7–0 (3–0, 1–0, 3–0)	China	IJssportcentrum Tilburg; Attendance: 1,452

Game reference

Ian Meierdres
Goalies
Sun Zehao
Referee:
(Italy) Andrea Benvegnu
Linesmen:
(Norway) Knut Einar Bråten
(United States) Ian McCambridge

Van der Schuit – 03:37	1–0
Van den Heuvel (Bastings, Joly) (PP) – 13:13	2–0
Nagtzaam (Van Oorschot) – 16:01	3–0
Vogelaar (Van Soest) – 26:28	4–0
Vogelaar (Bastings) – 42:30	5–0
Van den Heuvel (K. Bruijsten, Loginov) (SH) – 48:44	6–0
Stempher (Van der Schuit, Vogelaar) – 58:51	7–0

16 min
Penalties
6 min
39
Shots
9

24 April 2018; 13:00	Australia	6–0 (1–0, 2–0, 3–0)	Belgium	IJssportcentrum Tilburg; Attendance: 245

Game reference

Anthony Kimlin
Goalies
Mike Jansen
Referee:
(Italy) Andrea Benvegnu
Linesmen:
(Netherlands) Jos Korte
(United States) Ian McCambridge

Rezek (L. Webster) – 00:26	1–0
Darge (Woodman, Taylor) (PP) – 21:00	2–0
Tesarik (Miettinen) – 35:57	3–0
Goransson (Armstrong, Powell) (PP) – 40:54	4–0
Todd (Malloy, Armstrong) – 45:34	5–0
Todd (Armstrong, Malloy) – 48:38	6–0

12 min
Penalties
16 min
40
Shots
24

24 April 2018; 16:30	China	1–3 (0–1, 0–2, 1–0)	Serbia	IJssportcentrum Tilburg; Attendance: 257

Game reference

Sun Zehao
Goalies
Arsenije Ranković
Referee:
(Poland) Tomasz Radzik
Linesmen:
(Norway) Knut Einar Bråten
(Netherlands) Stef Oosterling

	0–1	10:08 – Luković (Crnogorac) (PP)
	0–2	20:59 – Zwick (Luković, Brkušanin)
	0–3	23:30 – Vučurević (Brkušanin, Ilić) (PP)
Huang Q. (Zhang C., Yan) – 56:59	1–3

54 min
Penalties
22 min
18
Shots
34

24 April 2018; 20:00	Iceland	1–11 (0–3, 0–3, 1–5)	Netherlands	IJssportcentrum Tilburg; Attendance: 1,347

Game reference

Dennis Hedström
Atli Valdimarsson
Goalies
Ian Meierdres
Martijn Oosterwijk
Referee:
(Russia) Sergey Morozov
Linesmen:
(Croatia) Tomislav Grozaj
(Japan) Kensuke Kanazawa

	0–1	07:51 – Van Lijden (M. Bruijsten)
	0–2	09:52 – De Hondt (Vogelaar)
	0–3	14:48 – M. Bruijsten (Van Lijden)
	0–4	26:41 – Joly
	0–5	29:08 – Smid (De Hondt) (PP)
	0–6	36:50 – Van Lijden (M. Bruijsten)
	0–7	43:23 – Vogelaar (Joly)
	0–8	43:41 – Bastings (Verkiel)
	0–9	45:34 – Joly (Van Soest)
	0–10	53:41 – Stempher (Bruijsten, Loginov)
Orongan (Mikaelsson) – 54:47	1–10
	1–11	57:07 – K. Bruijsten (Bastings, Van den Heuvel) (EA)

4 min
Penalties
10 min
7
Shots
66

26 April 2018; 13:00	China	1–3 (1–0, 0–0, 0–3)	Australia	IJssportcentrum Tilburg; Attendance: 411

Game reference

Sun Zehao
Goalies
Anthony Kimlin
Referee:
(Russia) Sergey Morozov
Linesmen:
(Norway) Knut Einar Bråten
(Japan) Kensuke Kanazawa

Zhang Z. (Huang Q.) – 11:10	1–0
	1–1	42:13 – Haselhurst (Armstrong, Todd)
	1–2	55:33 – Rezek (Haselhurst)
	1–3	59:22 – Armstrong (Goransson) (ENG, PP)

12 min
Penalties
18 min
24
Shots
38

26 April 2018; 16:30	Belgium	6–3 (1–0, 2–0, 3–3)	Iceland	IJssportcentrum Tilburg; Attendance: 243

Game reference

Arthur Legrand
Goalies
Dennis Hedström
Referee:
(Hungary) Miklós Haszonits
Linesmen:
(Netherlands) Jos Korte
(United States) Ian McCambridge

Van den Bogaert (De Smet, Verelst) – 12:57	1–0
Denis – 26:04	2–0
De Smet (Verelst) – 31:12	3–0
Henry (Delbrassine, Paulus) – 48:30	4–0
	4–1	52:25 – Sigurðsson (Pálsson) (PP)
	4–2	53:09 – Sigrúnarson (Kristinsson)
	4–3	57:30 – Sigurðsson (Jónsson, Sigrúnarson)
Bremer (Henry) – 58:20	5–3
Pellegrims (Verelst) (ENG) – 58:59	6–3

22 min
Penalties
20 min
43
Shots
24

26 April 2018; 20:00	Netherlands	5–0 (2–0, 2–0, 1–0)	Serbia	IJssportcentrum Tilburg; Attendance: 1,500

Game reference

Ian Meierdres
Goalies
Arsenije Ranković
Referee:
(Poland) Tomasz Radzik
Linesmen:
(Croatia) Tomislav Grozaj
(Latvia) Raivis Jučers

Van Soest (Joly) – 04:21	1–0
Van Soest (Joly, Oosterveld) – 09:40	2–0
Van den Heuvel (K. Bruijsten, Van Oorschot) (PP) – 31:56	3–0
Vogelaar (De Hondt, Stempher) (PP) – 32:26	4–0
Van Oorschot (Van den Heuvel, K. Bruijsten) – 54:06	5–0

20 min
Penalties
36 min
35
Shots
11

28 April 2018; 13:00	China	3–1 (0–0, 0–1, 3–0)	Iceland	IJssportcentrum Tilburg; Attendance: 321

Game reference

Sun Zehao
Goalies
Dennis Hedström
Referee:
(Poland) Tomasz Radzik
Linesmen:
(Latvia) Raivis Jučers
(Netherlands) Stef Oosterling

	0–1	25:07 – Jóhannesson (Þorsteinsson)
Zhang Z. (Zhang H.) – 47:24	1–1
Zhong (Sun, Zhang C.) (PP) – 48:43	2–1
Huang Q. (Sun) (ENG) – 58:19	3–1

12 min
Penalties
10 min
26
Shots
29

28 April 2018; 16:30	Belgium	2–10 (0–4, 1–4, 1–2)	Netherlands	IJssportcentrum Tilburg; Attendance: 2,400

Game reference

Mike Jansen
Arthur Legrand
Goalies
Ian Meierdres
Referee:
(Hungary) Miklós Haszonits
Linesmen:
(Croatia) Tomislav Grozaj
(United States) Ian McCambridge

	0–1	01:35 – Joly (Van Lijden)
	0–2	03:02 – K. Bruijsten (Van den Heuvel, Bastings)
	0–3	14:27 – Van Oorschot (Van Soest, Van Gestel)
	0–4	15:18 – Nagtzaam (Joly)
	0–5	22:13 – Vogelaar (Nagtzaam) (SH)
	0–6	29:12 – K. Bruijsten (Van den Heuvel)
Henry (Milpas, Denis) – 29:34	1–6
	1–7	38:00 – De Hondt (Dempher, Smid) (PP)
	1–8	38:44 – Bastings (K. Bruijsten)
De Smet (Paulus, Denis) (PP) – 48:47	2–8
	2–9	51:09 – Vogelaar (K. Bruijsten, Van den Heuvel)
	2–10	58:39 – Nagtzaam (K. Bruijsten, Loginov) (PP)

14 min
Penalties
18 min
18
Shots
51

28 April 2018; 20:00	Serbia	4–5 GWS (2–1, 0–1, 2–2) (OT 0–0) (SO: 0–1)	Australia	IJssportcentrum Tilburg; Attendance: 521

Game reference

Arsenije Ranković
Goalies
Anthony Kimlin
Referee:
(Italy) Andrea Benvegnu
Linesmen:
(Norway) Knut Einar Bråten
(Netherlands) Jos Korte

Podunavac (PP2) – 04:11	1–0
Vučurević (Sretović) (PP) – 15:38	2–0
	2–1	16:21 – L. Webster (Darge, Taylor)
	2–2	26:22 – Goransson (Todd, Armstrong) (PP)
	2–3	41:04 – Malloy (Goransson, Haselhurst)
	2–4	46:55 – Armstrong
Sretović (Đumić) (SH) – 52:57	3–4
Novaković (Podunavac) (PP, EA) – 59:50	4–4

Sretović
Vučurević
Đumić (miss)
Crnogorac (miss)
Brkušanin (miss)
Shootout
Rezek
Darge
(miss) Armstrong
(miss) Todd
Taylor
12 min
Penalties
22 min
39
Shots
33

29 April 2018; 13:00	Belgium	2–5 (0–0, 0–3, 2–2)	China	IJssportcentrum Tilburg; Attendance: 250

Game reference

Arthur Legrand
Goalies
Sun Zehao
Referee:
(Hungary) Miklós Haszonits
Linesmen:
(Croatia) Tomislav Grozaj
(United States) Ian McCambridge

	0–1	28:03– Zou (Huang P.)
	0–2	34:43 – Li (Liu, Zhang C.)
	0–3	35:49 – Huang Q. (Zhang Z.)
	0–4	43:31 – Zhang H. (Zhang Z.) (SH)
Henry (Bremer, Distate) – 49:51	1–4
Neven (Verelst, Paulus) (PP) – 56:36	2–4
	2–5	58:36 – Zhang Z. (Huang Q.)

39 min
Penalties
16 min
33
Shots
38

29 April 2018; 16:30	Netherlands	9–2 (4–0, 3–1, 2–1)	Australia	IJssportcentrum Tilburg; Attendance: 2,035

Game reference

Ian Meierdres
Martijn Oosterwijk
Goalies
Anthony Kimlin
Referee:
(Russia) Sergey Morozov
Linesmen:
(Norway) Knut Einar Bråten
(Latvia) Raivis Jučers

Van der Schuit (De Hondt, Stempher) – 01:02	1–0
Van der Schuit (Stempher) – 06:27	2–0
Smid – 12:27	3–0
Van Oorschot (Van den Heuvel, Van Soest) (PP) – 17:56	4–0
Bastings (Van den Heuvel, K. Bruijsten) – 24:18	5–0
Verkiel (Van Oorschot) – 26:21	6–0
	6–1	31:33 – K. Webster (Powell)
Vogelaar (Van der Schuit, Stempher) (PP) – 34:07	7–1
Stempher (De Hondt, Van Oorschot) – 51:12	8–1
Vogelaar (Van den Heuvel) – 57:05	9–1
	9–2	58:42 – Powell (K. Webster, Lindsay)

2 min
Penalties
8 min
66
Shots
19

29 April 2018; 20:00	Iceland	2–5 (1–1, 0–2, 1–2)	Serbia	IJssportcentrum Tilburg; Attendance: 311

Game reference

Dennis Hedström
Goalies
Arsenije Ranković
Referee:
(Italy) Andrea Benvegnu
Linesmen:
(Japan) Kensuke Kanazawa
(Netherlands) Stef Oosterling

	0–1	10:03 – Zwick (PP)
Olafsson (Induss) – 11:33	1–1
	1–2	32:40 – Novaković (Crnogorac)
	1–3	38:58 – Sretović (Brkušanin, Sabados) (PP)
	1–4	50:21 – Luković (Novaković)
	1–5	55:11 – Crnogorac (Podunavac) (SH2, ENG)
Jóhannesson (SH) – 58:37	2–5

8 min
Penalties
22 min
32
Shots
46

=== Awards and statistics ===
==== Awards ====
- Best players selected by the directorate:
  - Best Goalkeeper: (Australia) Anthony Kimlin
  - Best Defenseman: (Netherlands) Giovanni Vogelaar
  - Best Forward: (Netherlands) Ivy van den Heuvel

Source: IIHF.com

==== Scoring leaders ====
List shows the top skaters sorted by points, then goals.

Player	GP	G	A	Pts	+/−	PIM	POS
(Netherlands) Ivy van den Heuvel	5	3	8	11	+11	2	F
(Netherlands) Giovanni Vogelaar	5	8	2	10	+14	0	D
(Netherlands) Jordy van Oorschot	5	3	7	10	+6	2	D
(Netherlands) Mickey Bastings	5	3	6	9	+10	0	F
(Netherlands) Danny Stempher	5	3	6	9	+7	2	F
(Netherlands) Kevin Bruijsten	5	3	5	8	+7	2	F
(Netherlands) Raphael Joly	5	3	5	8	+11	2	F
(Australia) Matthew Armstrong	5	2	6	8	+3	6	F
(Netherlands) Reno de Hondt	5	2	5	7	+8	6	F
(Serbia) Petar Novaković	5	4	2	6	+1	4	F

GP = Games played; G = Goals; A = Assists; Pts = Points; +/− = Plus/minus; PIM = Penalties in minutes; POS = Position
Source: IIHF.com

==== Leading goaltenders ====
Only the top five goaltenders, based on save percentage, who have played at least 40% of their team's minutes, are included in this list.

Player	TOI	GA	GAA	SA	Sv%	SO
(Netherlands) Ian Meierdres	230:27	2	0.52	39	94.87	2
(Australia) Anthony Kimlin	305:00	14	2.75	173	91.91	2
(China) Sun Zehao	296:57	15	3.03	172	91.28	0
(Serbia) Arsenije Ranković	303:06	14	2.77	151	90.73	0
(Iceland) Dennis Hedström	275:56	19	4.13	201	90.55	0

TOI = Time on ice (minutes:seconds); SA = Shots against; GA = Goals against; GAA = Goals against average; Sv% = Save percentage; SO = Shutouts
Source: IIHF.com

== Group B tournament ==
2018 IIHF World Championship Division II B

Tournament details
- Host country: Spain
- Venue: 1 (in 1 host city)
- Dates: 14–20 April
- Teams: 6

Tournament statistics
- Games played: 15
- Goals scored: 133 (8.87 per game)
- Attendance: 2,565 (171 per game)
- Scoring leader: (Spain) Oriol Boronat (12 points)

Official website
- IIHF.com

=== Participants ===
Team	Qualification
Spain	Host, placed 6th in Division II A last year and were relegated.
New Zealand	Placed 2nd in Division II B last year.
Israel	Placed 3rd in Division II B last year.
North Korea	Placed 4th in Division II B last year.
Mexico	Placed 5th in Division II B last year.
Luxembourg	Placed 1st in Division III last year and were promoted.

=== Match officials ===
4 referees and 7 linesmen were selected for the tournament.

Referees

- (Latvia) Jevgēņijs Griškevičs
- (Slovakia) Milan Novák
- (Denmark) Rasmus Toppel
- (Belgium) Tim Tzirtziganis

Linesmen

- (Spain) Alejandro García
- (Germany) Marcus Höfer
- (Kazakhstan) Andrey Korovkin
- (Czech Republic) Jiří Svoboda
- (Spain) Carlos Trobajo
- (Belgium) Chris van Grinsven

=== Standings ===
Pos	Team	Pld	W	OTW	OTL	L	GF	GA	GD	Pts	Qualification or relegation
1	Spain (H, P)	5	5	0	0	0	49	6	+43	15	Promoted to Division II A
2	New Zealand	5	4	0	0	1	33	14	+19	12	
3	Israel	5	3	0	0	2	24	14	+10	9	
4	North Korea	5	1	0	0	4	12	40	−28	3 (Note: North Korea 3 Pts, +2 GD; Mexico 3 Pts, −1 GD, Luxembourg 3 Pts, −1 GD. Mexico 3–1 Luxembourg)	
5	Mexico	5	1	0	0	4	9	30	−21	3	
6	Luxembourg (R)	5	1	0	0	4	6	29	−23	3	Relegation to Division III

Source: IIHF
Rules for classification: 1) points; 2) head-to-head points; 3) head-to-head goal difference; 4) head-to-head number of goals scored; 5) result against closest best-ranked team outside tied teams; 6) result against second-best ranked team outside tied teams; 7) seeding before tournament.
(H) Host; (P) Promoted; (R) Relegated

=== Results ===
All times are local (UTC+2).

14 April 2018; 13:00	New Zealand	5–1 (1–0, 4–0, 0–1)	Mexico	Igloo Arena, Granada; Attendance: 55

Game reference

Daniel Lee
Goalies
Andrés de la Garma
Referee:
(Latvia) Jevgēņijs Griškevičs
Linesmen:
(Germany) Marcus Höfer
(Spain) Carlos Trobajo

Challis (McLeish) – 02:28	1–0
Henderson (Heyd, Challis) (PP) – 22:19	2–0
Harrop (Challis) – 25:42	3–0
Ellis (Helmersson, Polozov) (PP) – 35:05	4–0
Burns (Cox, Challis) (PP) – 39:33	5–0
	5–1	47:01 – Colas (SH)

8 min
Penalties
10 min
30
Shots
19

14 April 2018; 16:30	Luxembourg	1–8 (1–4, 0–2, 0–2)	Israel	Igloo Arena, Granada; Attendance: 61

Game reference

Gilles Mangen
Goalies
Maxim Gokhberg
Referee:
(Denmark) Rasmus Toppel
Linesmen:
(Spain) Alejandro García
(Belgium) Chris van Grinsven

	0–1	01:20 – Kozev (Kozhevnikov, Ben Tov)
	0–2	11:48 – Klein (Mazour, Kozevnikov) (PP)
	0–3	13:15 – Revinaga (Kozev)
	0–4	18:39 – R. Aharnovich (Mazour, Milner)
Mosr (Welter, Gronlund) (PP) – 19:37	1–4
	1–5	22:20 – T. Aharnovich (Milner, Spivak) (PP)
	1–6	36:38 – Spektor (Mazour, Milner) (PP)
	1–7	40:47 – Klein (Kozevnikov) (PP)
	1–8	50:14 – Mazour (Milner, Klein) (PP)

22 min
Penalties
26 min
14
Shots
45

14 April 2018; 20:15	Spain	15–1 (4–0, 8–1, 3–0)	North Korea	Igloo Arena, Granada; Attendance: 333

Game reference

Ander Alcaine
Raúl Barbo
Goalies
Pak Kuk-chol
Pak Il
Referee:
(Slovakia) Milan Novák
Linesmen:
(Kazakhstan) Andrey Korovkin
(Czech Republic) Jiří Svoboda

Rubio (Granell, Boronat) – 02:29	1–0
Carbonell – 05:29	2–0
Boronat (Ubieto) – 07:49	3–0
Solorzano (Fuentes) – 17:17	4–0
Hernández (Puyuelo, González) – 23:03	5–0
Carbonell (P. Muñoz, Rivero) – 23:41	6–0
	6–1	25:17 – Hong (Kim H., Kim M.)
Fuentes (Ubieto) (PP) – 27:02	7–1
Rubio (Boronat) – 27:53	8–1
Fuentes (Ubieto, González) (PP) – 30:31	9–1
Arraras (Hernández, Puyuelo) – 32:38	10–1
Solorzano (Puyuelo, Fuentes) (PP) – 35:45	11–1
Granell (Boronat) – 39:19	12–1
Arraras (Brabo, J. Muñoz) – 58:25	13–1
Boronat (Rubio, Granell) – 58:43	14–1
Hernández – 59:21	15–1

12 min
Penalties
22 min
44
Shots
20

15 April 2018; 13:00	New Zealand	5–2 (1–0, 0–1, 4–1)	Israel	Igloo Arena, Granada; Attendance: 67

Game reference

Daniel Lee
Goalies
Nir Tichon
Maxim Gokhberg
Referee:
(Slovakia) Milan Novák
Linesmen:
(Spain) Alejandro García
(Kazakhstan) Andrey Korovkin

Cox (Joyce, Henderson) – 15:43	1–0
	1–1	26:05 – R. Aharonovich (Milner)
Ratcliffe – 50:52	2–1
Ratcliffe (Helmersson) (PP) – 52:09	3–1
Joyce (Heyd, Challis) – 52:58	4–1
	4–2	54:05 – Klein (Mazour)
Schneider (Burns) – 54:34	5–2

4 min
Penalties
10 min
29
Shots
22

15 April 2018; 16:30	North Korea	5–2 (3–2, 2–0, 0–0)	Mexico	Igloo Arena, Granada; Attendance: 68

Game reference

Pak Kuk-chol
Goalies
Alfonso de Alba
Referee:
(Belgium) Tim Tzirtziganis
Linesmen:
(Spain) Carlos Trobajo
(Belgium) Chris van Grinsven

An (Kim Kw.) – 08:46	1–0
	1–1	09:28 – Cruz (Sierra)
	1–2	14:40 – Majul (Rosette, Colas)
Kang M. (Kang I.) (SH) – 17:27	2–2
Kim Kw. (Hong, Ri P.) – 19:05	3–2
An (Kim S., Ri H.) (PP) – 36:00	4–2
Kang M. (An) (SH) – 39:52	5–2

12 min
Penalties
18 min
30
Shots
25

15 April 2018; 20:00	Luxembourg	1–10 (0–0, 1–3, 0–7)	Spain	Igloo Arena, Granada; Attendance: 234

Game reference

Philippe Lepage
Goalies
Ander Alcaine
Referee:
(Latvia) Jevgēņijs Griškevičs
Linesmen:
(Germany) Marcus Höfer
(Czech Republic) Jiří Svoboda

	0–1	28:08 – Rubio (Ubieto)
	0–2	38:00 – Puyuelo (Ubieto, Vea)
Eriksson – 39:04	1–2
	1–3	39:58 – González (Puyuelo, Brabo)
	1–4	42:49 – González (Solorzano) (PP)
	1–5	44:34 – Ubieto (Boronat)
	1–6	50:24 – Hernández (P. Muñoz) (EA)
	1–7	52:27 – J. Muñoz (Fuentes) (PP)
	1–8	53:05 – Puyuelo (Hernández)
	1–9	55:40 – J. Muñoz (Puyuelo, Hernández)
	1–10	56:01 – Arraras (García, Rivero) (EA)

14 min
Penalties
6 min
14
Shots
51

17 April 2018; 13:00	Israel	9–1 (3–1, 4–0, 2–0)	North Korea	Igloo Arena, Granada; Attendance: 36

Game reference

Nir Tichon
Goalies
Pak Kuk-chol

Pak Il
Referee:
(Latvia) Jevgēņijs Griškevičs
Linesmen:
(Kazakhstan) Andrey Korovkin
(Czech Republic) Jiří Svoboda

Mazour (Spivak) (PP) – 05:29	1–0
	1–1	08:44 – Kim S. (Kim Kw., An) (SH)
Mazour (Spektor, Kozhevnikov) – 17:28	2–1
Vernyy (Kozevnikov) – 18:07	3–1
Spektor (Klein) (PP) – 20:28	4–1
Spektor (Klein, Mazour) – 22:35	5–1
Spektor (Mazour) (SH) – 31:16	6–1
Milner (R. Aharonovich) – 37:29	7–1
Revinaga (R. Aharonovich, Milner) – 42:25	8–1
Sherf (Kozevnikov, Vernyy) – 54:43	9–1

16 min
Penalties
14 min
30
Shots
31

17 April 2018; 16:30	New Zealand	7–1 (1–0, 2–1, 4–0)	Luxembourg	Igloo Arena, Granada; Attendance: 68

Game reference

Csaba Kercso-Magos
Goalies
Gilles Mangen
Referee:
(Belgium) Tim Tzirtziganis
Linesmen:
(Spain) Alejandro García
(Spain) Carlos Trobajo

Harrison (Rooney) – 11:07	1–0
Ratcliffe (Polozov) (PP) – 24:59	2–0
Heyd (McLeish) – 29:11	3–0
	3–1	29:36 – Mosr (C. Mossong)
Rooney (Helmersson, Craig) – 50:30	4–1
Craig (Polozov, Hay) – 50:43	5–1
Polozov (Schneider, Ratcliffe) – 55:00	6–1
Challis (Heyd, Cox) (PP2) – 58:22	7–1

0 min
Penalties
10 min
57
Shots
16

17 April 2018; 20:00	Spain	14–0 (4–0, 5–0, 5–0)	Mexico	Igloo Arena, Granada; Attendance: 157

Game reference

Ander Alcaine
Raúl Barbo
Goalies
Alfonso de Alba
Referee:
(Denmark) Rasmus Toppel
Linesmen:
(Germany) Marcus Höfer
(Belgium) Chris van Grinsven

P. Muñoz (Carbonell, Betrán) – 00:23	1–0
J. Muñoz (González, Solorzano) (PP) – 06:23	2–0
P. Muñoz (Carbonell, Rivero) – 12:22	3–0
P. Muñoz (Carbonell, Arraras) – 16:52	4–0
Betrán (Carbonell) (PP) – 24:13	5–0
García (Boronat) (PP2) – 31:28	6–0
P. Muñoz (Betrán, Brabo) – 34:28	7–0
P. Muñoz (Betrán) – 37:29	8–0
P. Muñoz (Carbonell, Brabo) (PP) – 38:42	9–0
Boronat (Granell, Brabo) (PP) – 47:15	10–0
P. Muñoz (Carbonell) – 49:46	11–0
J. Muñoz (Puyuelo, García) – 50:03	12–0
Ubieto (Fuentes, Solorzano) (PP) – 51:59	13–0
González (Solorzano) – 58:10	14–0

8 min
Penalties
24 min
49
Shots
5

19 April 2018; 13:00	Mexico	3–1 (1–0, 1–1, 1–0)	Luxembourg	Igloo Arena, Granada; Attendance: 300

Game reference

Andrés de la Garma
Goalies
Philippe Lepage
Referee:
(Slovakia) Milan Novák
Linesmen:
(Kazakhstan) Andrey Korovkin
(Czech Republic) Jiří Svoboda

Pérez (Sierra, Majul) (PP) – 06:57	1–0
Najera (Colas) – 29:44	2–0
	2–1	31:34 – Mosr (C. Mossong, Welter) (PP)
Majul (Pérez, Cruz) – 57:49	3–1

12 min
Penalties
8 min
28
Shots
26

19 April 2018; 16:30	North Korea	4–12 (1–4, 3–4, 0–4)	New Zealand	Igloo Arena, Granada; Attendance: 84

Game reference

Pak Kuk-chol
Pak Il
Goalies
Daniel Lee
Csaba Kercso-Magos
Referee:
(Denmark) Rasmus Toppel
Linesmen:
(Spain) Alejandro García
(Spain) Carlos Trobajo

	0–1	03:00 – S. Harrison (Burns)
	0–2	04:27 – Challis
	0–3	05:50 – Schneider (S. Harrison, Polozov)
	0–4	06:50 – Ellis (Joyce) (SH)
Hong (Kim Kw.) – 09:25	1–4
	1–5	24:53 – Ellis (Challis)
	1–6	26:17 – Schneider (Challis) (PP)
Kim Kw. (Kim H., Hong) – 26:35	2–6
Kang I. (Kim Kw.) (SH) – 30:33	3–6
	3–7	34:59 – Polozov (Schneider, Craig)
Kim H. (Ri P.) – 35:44	4–7
	4–8	38:21 – Ellis (PS)
	4–9	44:10 – Schneider (Polozov, S. Harrison)
	4–10	46:14 – Cox (Henderson, Challis) (PP2)
	4–11	47:01 – Heyd (Henderson, Challis) (PP)
	4–12	51:56 – C. Harrison (Schneider, Burns)

18 min
Penalties
8 min
21
Shots
49

19 April 2018; 20:00	Israel	0–4 (0–0, 0–2, 0–2)	Spain	Igloo Arena, Granada; Attendance: 390

Game reference

Nir Tichon
Goalies
Ander Alcaine
Referee:
(Belgium) Tim Tzirtziganis
Linesmen:
(Germany) Marcus Höfer
(Belgium) Chris van Grinsven

0–1	22:39 – P. Muñoz (Brabo, Rivero)
0–2	36:38 – Fuentes (Vea)
0–3	51:10 – Fuentes (González, Betrán) (PP)
0–4	52:36 – Granell (García) (PP)

22 min
Penalties
10 min
12
Shots
48

20 April 2018; 13:00	Luxembourg	2–1 (0–1, 1–0, 1–0)	North Korea	Igloo Arena, Granada; Attendance: 77

Game reference

Gilles Mangen
Goalies
Pak Kuk-chol
Referee:
(Latvia) Jevgēņijs Griškevičs
Linesmen:
(Kazakhstan) Andrey Korovkin
(Spain) Carlos Trobajo

	0–1	12:33 – Kim H. (Ri I.)
C. Cannon – 32:08	1–1
Eriksson (M. Cannon) – 44:55	2–1

18 min
Penalties
10 min
31
Shots
32

20 April 2018; 16:30	Mexico	3–5 (0–2, 2–2, 1–1)	Israel	Igloo Arena, Granada; Attendance: 94

Game reference

Andres de la Garma
Goalies
Nir Tichon
Referee:
(Denmark) Rasmus Toppel
Linesmen:
(Spain) Alejandro García
(Belgium) Chris van Grinsven

	0–1	13:56 – Kozhevnikov (Spivak, Vernyy)
	0–2	17:03 – Kozhevnikov (Vernyy)
	0–3	29:19 – Kozhevnikov (PP)
	0–4	36:44 – Spektor (SH)
Sierra (Chabat, Majul) (PP) – 37:25	1–4
Chabat (Padilla) – 38:58	2–4
Smithers (Ugarte) (PP) – 48:52	3–4
	3–5	49:35 – Vernyy (Ben Tov)

14 min
Penalties
51 min
26
Shots
37

20 April 2018; 20:00	Spain	6–4 (1–0, 4–3, 1–1)	New Zealand	Igloo Arena, Granada; Attendance: 541

Game reference

Ander Alcaine
Goalies
Daniel Lee
Referee:
(Slovakia) Milan Novák
Linesmen:
(Germany) Marcus Höfer
(Czech Republic) Jiří Svoboda

Carbonell (Rivero, P. Muñoz) (PP) – 18:12	1–0
Fuentes (Ubieto) (EA) – 21:39	2–0
	2–1	23:53 – Heyd (Burns, Henderson) (PP)
Rubio (Granell, Boronat) – 25:34	3–1
Boronat (Rubio) – 28:27	4–1
	4–2	33:04 – Polozov (Joyce, Schneider)
Granell (Ubieto, Boronat) – 36:38	5–2
	5–3	37:47 – Heyd (Cox)
Boronat (Rubio) – 42:51	6–3
	6–4	44:53 – Ellis (Polozov, Schneider) (PP)

4 min
Penalties
8 min
53
Shots
19

=== Awards and statistics ===
==== Awards ====
- Best players selected by the directorate:
  - Best Goalkeeper: (Spain) Ander Alcaine
  - Best Defenseman: (New Zealand) Stefan Helmersson
  - Best Forward: (Spain) Patricio Fuentes

Source: IIHF.com

==== Scoring leaders ====
List shows the top skaters sorted by points, then goals.

Player	GP	G	A	Pts	+/−	PIM	POS
(Spain) Oriol Boronat	5	5	7	12	+9	0	F
(Spain) Patricio Fuentes	5	5	6	11	+1	0	F
(Spain) Pablo Muñoz	5	7	3	10	+9	2	F
(New Zealand) Jordan Challis	5	3	7	10	0	0	F
(Spain) Adrian Ubieto	5	2	8	10	+12	4	D
(New Zealand) Matthew Schneider	5	4	5	9	+5	4	F
(Spain) Alejandro Carbonell	5	3	6	9	+10	0	F
(New Zealand) Aleksandr Polozov	5	3	6	9	+4	0	F
(Israel) Daniel Mazour	5	3	5	8	+2	6	F
(Spain) Pablo Puyuelo	5	2	6	8	+8	4	F

GP = Games played; G = Goals; A = Assists; Pts = Points; +/− = Plus/minus; PIM = Penalties in minutes; POS = Position
Source: IIHF.com

==== Leading goaltenders ====
Only the top five goaltenders, based on save percentage, who have played at least 40% of their team's minutes, are included in this list.

Player	TOI	GA	GAA	SA	Sv%	SO
(Israel) Nir Tichon	187:02	9	2.89	110	91.82	0
(New Zealand) Daniel Lee	199:36	10	3.01	105	90.48	0
(Spain) Ander Alcaine	242:16	6	1.49	58	89.66	1
(Mexico) Andrés de la Garma	178:27	11	3.70	93	88.17	0
(Luxembourg) Gilles Mangen	179:50	16	5.34	134	88.06	0

TOI = Time on ice (minutes:seconds); SA = Shots against; GA = Goals against; GAA = Goals against average; Sv% = Save percentage; SO = Shutouts
Source: IIHF.com
