= 2021 IIHF World Championship Division I =

International Ice Hockey Competition

Tournament details
- Host countries: Slovenia; Poland
- Venues: 2 (in 2 host cities)
- Dates: 9–15 May (cancelled); 26 April – 2 May (cancelled)
- Teams: 12

The 2021 IIHF World Championship Division I was scheduled to be an international ice hockey tournament run by the International Ice Hockey Federation.

The Group A tournament would have been held in Ljubljana, Slovenia from 9 to 15 May and the Group B tournament in Katowice, Poland from 26 April to 2 May 2021.

On 18 November 2020, both tournaments were cancelled due to the COVID-19 pandemic.

== Group A tournament ==
2021 IIHF World Championship Division I A
Tournament details
- Host country: Slovenia
- Venue: 1 (in 1 host city)
- Dates: 9–15 May (cancelled)
- Teams: 6

=== Participants ===
Team	Qualification
France	Placed 15th in the Elite Division in 2019 and was relegated.
Austria	Placed 16th in the Elite Division in 2019 and was relegated.
South Korea	Placed 3rd in Division I A in 2019.
Slovenia	Host, placed 4th in Division I A in 2019.
Hungary	Placed 5th in Division I A in 2019.
Romania	Placed 1st in Division I B in 2019 and was promoted.

=== Standings ===
Pos	Team	Pld	W	OTW	OTL	L	GF	GA	GD	Pts	Qualification or relegation
1	France	0	0	0	0	0	0	0	0	0	2022 IIHF World Championship
2	Austria	0	0	0	0	0	0	0	0	0	2022 IIHF World Championship
3	South Korea	0	0	0	0	0	0	0	0	0	
4	Slovenia (H)	0	0	0	0	0	0	0	0	0	
5	Hungary	0	0	0	0	0	0	0	0	0	
6	Romania	0	0	0	0	0	0	0	0	0	Relegation to 2022 Division I B

Rules for classification: 1) points; 2) head-to-head points; 3) head-to-head goal difference; 4) head-to-head number of goals scored; 5) result against closest best-ranked team outside tied teams; 6) result against second-best ranked team outside tied teams; 7) seeding before tournament.
(H) Host

== Group B tournament ==
2021 IIHF World Championship Division I B
Tournament details
- Host country: Poland
- Venue: 1 (in 1 host city)
- Dates: 26 April – 2 May (cancelled)
- Teams: 6

=== Participants ===
Team	Qualification
Lithuania	Placed 6th in Division I A in 2019 and was relegated.
Poland	Host, placed 2nd in Division I B in 2019.
Japan	Placed 3rd in Division I B in 2019.
Estonia	Placed 4th in Division I B in 2019.
Ukraine	Placed 5th in Division I B in 2019.
Serbia	Placed 1st in Division II A in 2019 and was promoted.

=== Standings ===
Pos	Team	Pld	W	OTW	OTL	L	GF	GA	GD	Pts	Qualification or relegation
1	Lithuania	0	0	0	0	0	0	0	0	0	Promotion to 2022 Division I A
2	Poland (H)	0	0	0	0	0	0	0	0	0	
3	Japan	0	0	0	0	0	0	0	0	0	
4	Estonia	0	0	0	0	0	0	0	0	0	
5	Ukraine	0	0	0	0	0	0	0	0	0	
6	Serbia	0	0	0	0	0	0	0	0	0	Relegation to 2022 Division II A

Rules for classification: 1) points; 2) head-to-head points; 3) head-to-head goal difference; 4) head-to-head number of goals scored; 5) result against closest best-ranked team outside tied teams; 6) result against second-best ranked team outside tied teams; 7) seeding before tournament.
(H) Host
