= 2020 IIHF World Championship Division I =

Cancelled ice hockey tournament

Tournament details
- Host countries: Slovenia; Poland
- Venues: 2 (in 2 host cities)
- Dates: 27 April – 3 May (cancelled)
- Teams: 12

The 2020 IIHF World Championship Division I was a scheduled international ice hockey tournament run by the International Ice Hockey Federation.

The Group A tournament was scheduled to be held in Ljubljana, Slovenia and the Group B tournament in Katowice, Poland from 27 April to 3 May 2020. However, on 17 March 2020 IIHF announced the cancellation of both tournaments following the COVID-19 pandemic.

== Group A tournament ==
2020 IIHF World Championship Division I A

Tournament details
- Host country: Slovenia
- Venue: 1 (in 1 host city)
- Dates: 27 April – 3 May (cancelled)
- Teams: 6

Official website
- Website

=== Participants ===
Team	Qualification
France	Placed 15th in the Elite Division in 2019 and was relegated.
Austria	Placed 16th in the Elite Division in 2019 and was relegated.
South Korea	Placed 3rd in Division I A in 2019.
Slovenia	Host, placed 4th in Division I A in 2019.
Hungary	Placed 5th in Division I A in 2019.
Romania	Placed 1st in Division I B in 2019 and was promoted.

=== Match officials ===
7 referees and 7 linesmen were selected for the tournament.

Referees	Linesmen
(Canada) Jeff Ingram; (Germany) Sirko Hunnius; (Latvia) Andris Ansons; (Norway) Roy Stian Hansen; (Russia) Denis Naumov; (Slovakia) Miroslav Štefík; (Sweden) Christoffer Holm	(Czech Republic) Josef Špůr; (Denmark) Andreas Weise Krøyer; (Finland) Joona Elonen; (France) Nicolas Constantineau; (Russia) Yevgeni Yudin; (Slovenia) Gašper Jaka Zgonc; (South Korea) Park Jun-soo

=== Standings ===
Pos	Team	Pld	W	OTW	OTL	L	GF	GA	GD	Pts	Qualification or relegation
1	France	0	0	0	0	0	0	0	0	0	2021 IIHF World Championship (Note: If both Belarus and Latvia finished 8th in their groups then only one team would have been promoted.)
2	Austria	0	0	0	0	0	0	0	0	0	2021 IIHF World Championship
3	South Korea	0	0	0	0	0	0	0	0	0	
4	Slovenia (H)	0	0	0	0	0	0	0	0	0	
5	Hungary	0	0	0	0	0	0	0	0	0	
6	Romania	0	0	0	0	0	0	0	0	0	Relegation to 2021 Division I B

Source: N/A
Rules for classification: 1) points; 2) head-to-head points; 3) head-to-head goal difference; 4) head-to-head number of goals scored; 5) result against closest best-ranked team outside tied teams; 6) result against second-best ranked team outside tied teams; 7) seeding before tournament.
(H) Host

=== Results ===
All times are local (UTC+2).

27 April 2020; 13:00	Hungary	Cancelled	South Korea	Tivoli Hall, Ljubljana

27 April 2020; 16:30	Romania	Cancelled	France	Tivoli Hall, Ljubljana

27 April 2020; 20:00	Slovenia	Cancelled	Austria	Tivoli Hall, Ljubljana

28 April 2020; 15:30	South Korea	Cancelled	Romania	Tivoli Hall, Ljubljana

28 April 2020; 19:00	Austria	Cancelled	Hungary	Tivoli Hall, Ljubljana

29 April 2020; 19:00	France	Cancelled	Slovenia	Tivoli Hall, Ljubljana

30 April 2020; 13:00	Austria	Cancelled	South Korea	Tivoli Hall, Ljubljana

30 April 2020; 16:30	France	Cancelled	Hungary	Tivoli Hall, Ljubljana

30 April 2020; 20:00	Romania	Cancelled	Slovenia	Tivoli Hall, Ljubljana

1 May 2020; 19:00	Austria	Cancelled	Romania	Tivoli Hall, Ljubljana

2 May 2020; 16:30	Slovenia	Cancelled	Hungary	Tivoli Hall, Ljubljana

2 May 2020; 20:00	South Korea	Cancelled	France	Tivoli Hall, Ljubljana

3 May 2020; 13:00	Hungary	Cancelled	Romania	Tivoli Hall, Ljubljana

3 May 2020; 16:30	South Korea	Cancelled	Slovenia	Tivoli Hall, Ljubljana

3 May 2020; 20:00	France	Cancelled	Austria	Tivoli Hall, Ljubljana

== Group B tournament ==
2020 IIHF World Championship Division I B

Tournament details
- Host country: Poland
- Venue: 1 (in 1 host city)
- Dates: 27 April – 3 May (cancelled)
- Teams: 6

Official website
- Website

=== Participants ===
Team	Qualification
Lithuania	Placed 6th in Division I A in 2019 and was relegated.
Poland	Host, placed 2nd in Division I B in 2019.
Japan	Placed 3rd in Division I B in 2019.
Estonia	Placed 4th in Division I B in 2019.
Ukraine	Placed 5th in Division I B in 2019.
Serbia	Placed 1st in Division II A in 2019 and was promoted.

=== Match officials ===
Four referees and seven linesmen were selected for the tournament.

Referees	Linesmen
(France) Nicolas Cregut; (United Kingdom) Dean Smith; (Norway) Robert Hallin; (Slovenia) Milan Zrnic	(Germany) Gabriel Gaube; (Italy) Ulrich Pardatscher; (Latvia) Uldis Bušs; (Poland) Mateusz Bucki; (Poland) Rafał Noworyta; (Serbia) Ivan Nedeljković; (United States) Kevin Briganti

=== Standings ===
Pos	Team	Pld	W	OTW	OTL	L	GF	GA	GD	Pts	Qualification or relegation
1	Lithuania	0	0	0	0	0	0	0	0	0	Promotion to 2021 Division I A
2	Poland (H)	0	0	0	0	0	0	0	0	0	
3	Japan	0	0	0	0	0	0	0	0	0	
4	Estonia	0	0	0	0	0	0	0	0	0	
5	Ukraine	0	0	0	0	0	0	0	0	0	
6	Serbia	0	0	0	0	0	0	0	0	0	Relegation to 2021 Division II A

Source: N/A
Rules for classification: 1) points; 2) head-to-head points; 3) head-to-head goal difference; 4) head-to-head number of goals scored; 5) result against closest best-ranked team outside tied teams; 6) result against second-best ranked team outside tied teams; 7) seeding before tournament.
(H) Host

=== Results ===
All times are local (UTC+2).

27 April 2020; 13:00	Serbia	Cancelled	Lithuania	Spodek, Katowice

27 April 2020; 16:30	Ukraine	Cancelled	Japan	Spodek, Katowice

27 April 2020; 20:00	Estonia	Cancelled	Poland	Spodek, Katowice

28 April 2020; 13:00	Japan	Cancelled	Serbia	Spodek, Katowice

28 April 2020; 16:30	Lithuania	Cancelled	Estonia	Spodek, Katowice

28 April 2020; 20:00	Poland	Cancelled	Ukraine	Spodek, Katowice

30 April 2020; 13:00	Lithuania	Cancelled	Ukraine	Spodek, Katowice

30 April 2020; 16:30	Serbia	Cancelled	Estonia	Spodek, Katowice

30 April 2020; 20:00	Poland	Cancelled	Japan	Spodek, Katowice

1 May 2020; 13:00	Estonia	Cancelled	Ukraine	Spodek, Katowice

1 May 2020; 16:30	Japan	Cancelled	Lithuania	Spodek, Katowice

1 May 2020; 20:00	Poland	Cancelled	Serbia	Spodek, Katowice

3 May 2020; 13:00	Japan	Cancelled	Estonia	Spodek, Katowice

3 May 2020; 16:30	Ukraine	Cancelled	Serbia	Spodek, Katowice

3 May 2020; 20:00	Lithuania	Cancelled	Poland	Spodek, Katowice
