= Robert Mack =

Austrian ice hockey player (1959–2020)

Personal information
- Nationality: Austrian
- Born: 1 July 1959 Klagenfurt, Austria
- Died: 4 July 2020 (aged 61) Vienna, Austria

Sport
- Sport: Ice hockey

Robert Mack (1 July 1959 – 4 July 2020) was an Austrian ice hockey player. He competed in the men's tournament at the 1988 Winter Olympics.
