= Erkki Hytönen =

Finnish ice hockey player (1933–2020)

Personal information
- Nationality: Finnish
- Born: 27 May 1933; Tampere, Finland
- Died: 22 December 2020 (aged 87)

Sport
- Sport: Ice hockey

Erkki Olavi Hytönen (27 May 1933 – 22 December 2020) was a Finnish ice hockey player. He competed in the men's tournament at the 1952 Winter Olympics.
