= Annar Petersen =

Norwegian ice hockey player (1931–2020)

Personal information
- Born: 23 November 1931 Oslo, Norway
- Died: 21 March 2020 (aged 88)

Sport
- Sport: Ice hockey

Annar Engelbreth Petersen (23 November 1931 – 21 March 2020) was a Norwegian ice hockey player, born in Oslo, Norway. He played for the Norwegian national ice hockey team, and participated at the Winter Olympics in 1952, where the Norwegian team placed 9th.
