= Vincenzo Fardella (ice hockey) =

Italian ice hockey player (1926–2020)

Personal information
- Nationality: Italian
- Born: 8 May 1926; Brescia, Italy
- Died: 14 April 2020 (aged 93); Milan, Italy

Sport
- Sport: Ice hockey

Vincenzo Fardella (8 May 1926 – 14 April 2020) was an Italian ice hockey player. He competed in the men's tournament at the 1948 Winter Olympics.
