= Seaver Peters =

American ice hockey player and college athletics administrator (1932–2020)

Biographical details
- Born: August 10, 1932; Melrose, Massachusetts, U.S.
- Died: February 23, 2020 (aged 87)

Playing career
- 1951–1954: Dartmouth

Administrative career (AD unless noted)
- 1967–1983: Dartmouth

Seaver Peters (August 10, 1932 – February 23, 2020) was an American ice hockey player and college athletics administrator. He attended Dartmouth College where he was captain of the men's ice hockey team and graduated in 1954. He later served as Dartmouth's athletic director from 1967 to 1983. In 2010, he was inducted into the New Hampshire Legends of Hockey Hall of Fame. He died on February 23, 2020, aged 87.
