= Vilen Prokofyev =

Kazakhstani ice hockey player (2001–2020)

- Born: April 22, 2001 Satpayev, Kazakhstan
- Died: 3 February 2020 (aged 18) Moscow, Russia
- Height: 179 cm (5 ft 10 in)
- Weight: 67 kg (148 lb; 10 st 8 lb)
- Position: Goaltender
- Caught: Left
- Played for: Snezhnye Barsy
- Playing career: 2017–2020

Vilen Prokofyev (Kazakh: Вилен Прокофьев) (April 22, 2001 – February 3, 2020) was a Kazakhstani ice hockey goaltender for Snezhnye Barsy of the Russian Junior Hockey League (MHL) from 2017 to 2020. He died of Ewing's sarcoma on February 3, 2020, aged 18.

== Playing career ==
Prokofyev began his Russian Junior Hockey League (MHL) career in the 2017–18 season at just 16 years old. On March 2, 2018, during a 6–1 defeat to Mamonty Yugry, he suffered a neck injury when he came into contact with the skate blade of Yugry defenseman Dmitry Yushkevich. While the injury was not serious, it forced him to leave the game early.

== Illness and death ==
Prokofyev began experiencing hip issues in May 2019, which marked the early signs of his illness. In November of that year, he was diagnosed with Ewing's sarcoma, a rare form of bone and soft tissue cancer. He received chemotherapy treatment in Moscow, with several Kontinental Hockey League (KHL) teams launching fundraising efforts to help cover the $190,000 needed for his care. To support him, Russian goaltender Ilya Sorokin wore goalie pads designed by children with cancer during the 2020 KHL All-Star Game, and the pads were later auctioned to raise money for Prokofyev's treatment.

Prokofyev died in Moscow on the morning of February 3, 2020, at the age of 18. Before his death, he had undergone one round of chemotherapy and surgery to remove the cancer. A public memorial was held in his honor at Barys Arena on February 6, 2020, and he was later laid to rest in his hometown of Satpayev.

== Career statistics ==
=== Regular season and playoffs ===
			Regular season									Playoffs
Season	Team	League	GP	W	L	T/OT	MIN	GA	SO	GAA	SV%	GP	W	L	MIN	GA	SO	GAA	SV%
2017–18	Snezhnye Barsy	MHL	14	2	7	1	591	45	0	4.57	.858	—	—	—	—	—	—	—	—
2018–19	Barys Astana	KAZ U20	7	7	0	0	403	14	1	2.09	.891	—	—	—	—	—	—	—	—
2018–19	Snezhnye Barsy	MHL	2	0	1	0	77	4	0	3.15	.907	3	1	1	74	5	0	4.08	.872
2019–20	Snezhnye Barsy	MHL	10	1	6	1	537	31	0	3.47	.903	—	—	—	—	—	—	—	—
MHL totals			26	3	14	2	1,204	80	0	3.99	.882	3	1	1	74	5	0	4.08	.872

=== International ===
Year	Team	Event	Result	GP	W	L	T	MIN	GA	SO	GAA	SV%
2018	Kazakhstan	U18 (Div IA)	4th	3	1	2	0	180	7	0	2.34	.910
2019	Kazakhstan	U18 (Div IA)	2nd place, silver medalist(s)	1	0	1	0	47	5	0	6.44	.853
Junior totals				4	1	3	0	226	12	0	3.19	.893
