= Werner Lorenz (ice hockey) =

German ice hockey player (1937–2020)

- Born: 5 January 1937; Ludwigshafen, Germany
- Died: 20 March 2020 (aged 83)
- Position: Defenceman
- Eishockey-Bundesliga team: Adler Mannheim
- Playing career: 1952–1971

Werner Lorenz (5 January 1937 – 20 March 2020) was a German ice hockey player. He spent his entire career with Adler Mannheim, from 1952 to 1971.
