= Alfred Püls =

Austrian ice hockey player (1933–2020)

Personal information
- Nationality: Austrian
- Born: 12 August 1933; Innsbruck, Austria
- Died: 10 August 2020 (aged 86)

Sport
- Sport: Ice hockey

Alfred Püls (12 August 1933 – 10 August 2020) was an Austrian ice hockey player. He competed in the men's tournaments at the 1956 Winter Olympics and the 1964 Winter Olympics.
