= 2020 IIHF World Championship Division III =

International ice hockey tournament

Tournament details
- Host countries: Luxembourg; South Africa
- Venues: 2 (in 2 host cities)
- Dates: 19–25 April (cancelled); 20–23 April (cancelled)
- Teams: 10

The 2020 IIHF World Championship Division III was an international ice hockey tournament run by the International Ice Hockey Federation.

The Group A tournament would have been held in Kockelscheuer, Luxembourg from 19 to 25 April and the Group B tournament in Cape Town, South Africa from 20 to 23 April 2020.

Both tournaments were cancelled on 13 March 2020 due to the COVID-19 pandemic.

== Group A tournament ==
2020 IIHF World Championship Division III A

Tournament details
- Host country: Luxembourg
- Venue: 1 (in 1 host city)
- Dates: 19–25 April (cancelled)
- Teams: 6

Official website
- Website

=== Participants ===
Team	Qualification
North Korea	Placed 6th in Division II B previous year and was relegated.
Turkey	Placed 2nd in Division III previous year.
Turkmenistan	Placed 3rd in Division III previous year.
Luxembourg	Host, placed 4th in Division III previous year.
Chinese Taipei	Placed 5th in Division III previous year.
United Arab Emirates	Placed 1st in Division III Q previous year and was promoted.

=== Match officials ===
Four referees and seven linesmen are selected for the tournament.

Referees	Linesmen
(Czech Republic) Petr Úlehla; (Japan) Shingo Ikegami; (South Africa) Jonathan Burger; (United States) Steven Sailor	(Belgium) Maarten Van den Acker; (Czech Republic) David Klouček; (Finland) Niko Jusi; (Netherlands) Lodewijk Beelen; (Norway) Niklas Wilhelmsen; (Slovenia) Grega Markizeti; (Switzerland) Daniel Duarte

=== Standings ===
Pos	Team	Pld	W	OTW	OTL	L	GF	GA	GD	Pts	Qualification or relegation
1	North Korea	0	0	0	0	0	0	0	0	0	Promotion to 2021 Division II B
2	Turkey	0	0	0	0	0	0	0	0	0	
3	Turkmenistan	0	0	0	0	0	0	0	0	0	
4	Luxembourg (H)	0	0	0	0	0	0	0	0	0	
5	Chinese Taipei	0	0	0	0	0	0	0	0	0	
6	United Arab Emirates	0	0	0	0	0	0	0	0	0	Relegation to 2021 Division III B

Source: N/A
Rules for classification: 1) points; 2) head-to-head points; 3) head-to-head goal difference; 4) head-to-head number of goals scored; 5) result against closest best-ranked team outside tied teams; 6) result against second-best ranked team outside tied teams; 7) seeding before tournament.
(H) Host

=== Results ===
All times are local (UTC+2).

19 April 2020; 12:30	Turkmenistan	Cancelled	North Korea	Patinoire de Kockelscheuer, Kockelscheuer

19 April 2020; 16:00	Turkey	Cancelled	Chinese Taipei	Patinoire de Kockelscheuer, Kockelscheuer

19 April 2020; 19:30	United Arab Emirates	Cancelled	Luxembourg	Patinoire de Kockelscheuer, Kockelscheuer

20 April 2020; 12:30	Turkey	Cancelled	Turkmenistan	Patinoire de Kockelscheuer, Kockelscheuer

20 April 2020; 16:00	Chinese Taipei	Cancelled	United Arab Emirates	Patinoire de Kockelscheuer, Kockelscheuer

20 April 2020; 19:30	North Korea	Cancelled	Luxembourg	Patinoire de Kockelscheuer, Kockelscheuer

22 April 2020; 12:30	Turkey	Cancelled	United Arab Emirates	Patinoire de Kockelscheuer, Kockelscheuer

22 April 2020; 16:00	North Korea	Cancelled	Chinese Taipei	Patinoire de Kockelscheuer, Kockelscheuer

22 April 2020; 19:30	Turkmenistan	Cancelled	Luxembourg	Patinoire de Kockelscheuer, Kockelscheuer

24 April 2020; 12:30	United Arab Emirates	Cancelled	North Korea	Patinoire de Kockelscheuer, Kockelscheuer

24 April 2020; 16:00	Chinese Taipei	Cancelled	Turkmenistan	Patinoire de Kockelscheuer, Kockelscheuer

24 April 2020; 19:30	Luxembourg	Cancelled	Turkey	Patinoire de Kockelscheuer, Kockelscheuer

25 April 2020; 12:30	Turkmenistan	Cancelled	United Arab Emirates	Patinoire de Kockelscheuer, Kockelscheuer

25 April 2020; 16:00	North Korea	Cancelled	Turkey	Patinoire de Kockelscheuer, Kockelscheuer

25 April 2020; 19:30	Luxembourg	Cancelled	Chinese Taipei	Patinoire de Kockelscheuer, Kockelscheuer

== Group B tournament ==
2020 IIHF World Championship Division III B

Tournament details
- Host country: South Africa
- Venue: 1 (in 1 host city)
- Dates: 20–23 April (cancelled)
- Teams: 4

Official website
- Website

=== Participants ===
Team	Qualification
South Africa	Host, placed 6th in Division III previous year and was relegated.
Hong Kong	Placed 2nd in Division III Q previous year.
Thailand	Placed 3rd in Division III Q previous year.
Bosnia and Herzegovina	Placed 4th in Division III Q previous year.

=== Match officials ===
Three referees and four linesmen are selected for the tournament.

Referees	Linesmen
(Estonia) Anton Semjonov; (France) Adrien Ernecq; (Slovenia) Viki Trilar	(Mexico) Óscar Pérez; (South Africa) Morne Moses; (South Africa) Frank Radue; (Slovenia) Matjaž Hribar

=== Standings ===
Pos	Team	Pld	W	OTW	OTL	L	GF	GA	GD	Pts	Qualification or relegation
1	South Africa (H)	0	0	0	0	0	0	0	0	0	Promotion to 2021 Division III A
2	Hong Kong	0	0	0	0	0	0	0	0	0	
3	Thailand	0	0	0	0	0	0	0	0	0	
4	Bosnia and Herzegovina	0	0	0	0	0	0	0	0	0	Relegation to 2021 Division IV

Source: N/A
Rules for classification: 1) points; 2) head-to-head points; 3) head-to-head goal difference; 4) head-to-head number of goals scored; 5) result against closest best-ranked team outside tied teams; 6) result against second-best ranked team outside tied teams; 7) seeding before tournament.
(H) Host

=== Results ===
All times are local (UTC+2).

20 April 2020; 15:00	Hong Kong	Cancelled	Bosnia and Herzegovina	The Ice Station, Cape Town

20 April 2020; 20:00	Thailand	Cancelled	South Africa	The Ice Station, Cape Town

21 April 2020; 15:00	Hong Kong	Cancelled	Thailand	The Ice Station, Cape Town

21 April 2020; 19:00	South Africa	Cancelled	Bosnia and Herzegovina	The Ice Station, Cape Town

23 April 2020; 15:00	Bosnia and Herzegovina	Cancelled	Thailand	The Ice Station, Cape Town

23 April 2020; 19:00	South Africa	Cancelled	Hong Kong	The Ice Station, Cape Town
