= 2020 IIHF World Championship =

2020 edition of the IIHF World Championship

Tournament details
- Host country: Switzerland
- Venue(s): 2 (in 2 host cities)
- Dates: 8–24 May (cancelled)
- Teams: 16

The 2020 IIHF World Championship would have been hosted by Switzerland from 8 to 24 May 2020, as the IIHF announced on 15 May 2015 in Prague, Czech Republic.

The tournament was cancelled on 21 March 2020 due to the COVID-19 pandemic. IIHF All-Time Teams were selected on the 100-year anniversary of the Ice Hockey World Championships, from the countries that would have participated at the 2020 IIHF World Championship.

== Venues ==
Zürich	2020 IIHF World Championship is located in Switzerland	Lausanne
Hallenstadion	2020 IIHF World Championship is located in Switzerland	Vaudoise Aréna
47°24′41″N 8°33′6″E	2020 IIHF World Championship is located in Switzerland	46°31′43″N 6°36′0″E
Capacity: 11,200	2020 IIHF World Championship is located in Switzerland	Capacity: 9,600

== Participants ==
Qualified as host

- Switzerland

Automatic qualifier after a top 14 placement at the 2019 IIHF World Championship

- Canada
- Czech Republic
- Denmark
- Finland
- Germany
- Great Britain
- Italy
- Latvia
- Norway
- Russia
- Slovakia
- Sweden
- United States

Qualified through winning a promotion at the 2019 IIHF World Championship Division I

- Belarus
- Kazakhstan

== Seeding ==
The seedings in the preliminary round are based on the 2019 IIHF World Ranking, as of the end of the 2019 IIHF World Championship, using the serpentine system.

Group A (Lausanne)

- Canada (1)
- Sweden (4)
- Czech Republic (5)
- Germany (7)
- Slovakia (9)
- Denmark (12)
- Belarus (14)
- Great Britain (20)

Group B (Zürich)

- Russia (2)
- Finland (3)
- United States (6)
- Switzerland (8)
- Latvia (10)
- Norway (11)
- Italy (16)
- Kazakhstan (19)

== Match officials ==
16 referees and linesmen were announced on 25 February 2020.

Referees	Linesmen
(Belarus) Maxim Sidorenko; (Canada) Alexandre Garon; (Canada) Oliver Gouin; (Czech Republic) Antonín Jeřábek; (Czech Republic) Robin Sir; (Denmark) Mads Frandsen; (Finland) Mikko Kaukokari; (Finland) Anssi Salonen; (Germany) Marian Rohatsch; (Russia) Roman Gofman; (Russia) Yevgeni Romasko; (Sweden) Mikael Nord; (Sweden) Linus Öhlund; (Switzerland) Daniel Stricker; (United States) Andrew Bruggeman; (United States) Jeremy Tufts	(Austria) Elias Seewald; (Belarus) Dmitri Golyak; (Canada) Maxime Chaput; (Canada) Dustin McCrank; (Czech Republic) Jiří Ondráček; (Denmark) Henrik Haurum; (Finland) Hannu Sormunen; (Finland) Lauri Nikulainen; (Norway) Alexander Waldejer; (Russia) Dmitri Shishlo; (Russia) Nikita Shalagin; (Switzerland) David Obwegeser; (Sweden) Andreas Malmqvist; (Sweden) Emil Yletyinen; (United States) Jake Davis; (United States) William Hancock

== Preliminary round ==
The schedule was announced on 1 August 2019.

=== Group A ===
==== Standings ====
Pos	Team	Pld	W	OTW	OTL	L	GF	GA	GD	Pts
1	Canada	0	0	0	0	0	0	0	0	0
2	Sweden	0	0	0	0	0	0	0	0	0
3	Czech Republic	0	0	0	0	0	0	0	0	0
4	Germany	0	0	0	0	0	0	0	0	0
5	Slovakia	0	0	0	0	0	0	0	0	0
6	Denmark	0	0	0	0	0	0	0	0	0
7	Belarus	0	0	0	0	0	0	0	0	0
8	Great Britain	0	0	0	0	0	0	0	0	0

Rules for classification: 1) points; 2) head-to-head points; 3) head-to-head goal difference; 4) head-to-head number of goals scored; 5) result against closest best-ranked team outside tied teams; 6) result against second-best ranked team outside tied teams; 7) seeding before tournament.

==== Matches ====
8 May 2020
Canada	Cancelled	Germany
Sweden	Cancelled	Czech Republic
9 May 2020
Germany	Cancelled	Great Britain
Slovakia	Cancelled	Denmark
Belarus	Cancelled	Czech Republic
10 May 2020
Great Britain	Cancelled	Slovakia
Canada	Cancelled	Denmark
Sweden	Cancelled	Belarus
11 May 2020
Czech Republic	Cancelled	Canada
Germany	Cancelled	Sweden
12 May 2020
Great Britain	Cancelled	Denmark
Belarus	Cancelled	Slovakia
13 May 2020
Czech Republic	Cancelled	Great Britain
Canada	Cancelled	Belarus
14 May 2020
Denmark	Cancelled	Germany
Sweden	Cancelled	Slovakia
15 May 2020
Germany	Cancelled	Belarus
Great Britain	Cancelled	Canada
16 May 2020
Denmark	Cancelled	Belarus
Canada	Cancelled	Sweden
Slovakia	Cancelled	Czech Republic
17 May 2020
Sweden	Cancelled	Great Britain
Germany	Cancelled	Slovakia
18 May 2020
Belarus	Cancelled	Great Britain
Czech Republic	Cancelled	Denmark
19 May 2020
Slovakia	Cancelled	Canada
Czech Republic	Cancelled	Germany
Denmark	Cancelled	Sweden

=== Group B ===
==== Standings ====
Pos	Team	Pld	W	OTW	OTL	L	GF	GA	GD	Pts
1	Russia	0	0	0	0	0	0	0	0	0
2	Finland	0	0	0	0	0	0	0	0	0
3	United States	0	0	0	0	0	0	0	0	0
4	Switzerland (H)	0	0	0	0	0	0	0	0	0
5	Latvia	0	0	0	0	0	0	0	0	0
6	Norway	0	0	0	0	0	0	0	0	0
7	Italy	0	0	0	0	0	0	0	0	0
8	Kazakhstan	0	0	0	0	0	0	0	0	0

Rules for classification: 1) points; 2) head-to-head points; 3) head-to-head goal difference; 4) head-to-head number of goals scored; 5) result against closest best-ranked team outside tied teams; 6) result against second-best ranked team outside tied teams; 7) seeding before tournament.
(H) Host

==== Matches ====
8 May 2020
Finland	Cancelled	United States
Russia	Cancelled	Switzerland
9 May 2020
Italy	Cancelled	United States
Latvia	Cancelled	Norway
Switzerland	Cancelled	Kazakhstan
10 May 2020
Russia	Cancelled	Norway
Kazakhstan	Cancelled	Latvia
Finland	Cancelled	Italy
11 May 2020
United States	Cancelled	Russia
Switzerland	Cancelled	Finland
12 May 2020
Kazakhstan	Cancelled	Norway
Italy	Cancelled	Latvia
13 May 2020
United States	Cancelled	Kazakhstan
Russia	Cancelled	Italy
14 May 2020
Norway	Cancelled	Switzerland
Finland	Cancelled	Latvia
15 May 2020
Kazakhstan	Cancelled	Russia
Switzerland	Cancelled	Italy
16 May 2020
Latvia	Cancelled	United States
Norway	Cancelled	Italy
Russia	Cancelled	Finland
17 May 2020
Finland	Cancelled	Kazakhstan
Switzerland	Cancelled	Latvia
18 May 2020
Italy	Cancelled	Kazakhstan
United States	Cancelled	Norway
19 May 2020
Latvia	Cancelled	Russia
Norway	Cancelled	Finland
United States	Cancelled	Switzerland

== Playoff round ==
=== Bracket ===
There will be a re-seeding after the quarterfinals.

Quarterfinals
21 May – Lausanne
A1
B4
21 May – Zürich
B1
A4
21 May – Lausanne
A2
B3
21 May – Zürich
B2
A3

Semifinals
23 May – Zürich
1st
4th
23 May – Zürich
2nd
3rd

Gold medal game
24 May – Zürich
W1
W2
Bronze medal game
24 May – Zürich
L1
L2

All times are local (UTC+2).

=== Quarterfinals ===
21 May 2020; 14:20	N/A	Cancelled	N/A	Vaudoise aréna, Lausanne

21 May 2020; 16:20	N/A	Cancelled	N/A	Hallenstadion, Zürich

21 May 2020; 18:20	N/A	Cancelled	N/A	Vaudoise aréna, Lausanne

21 May 2020; 20:20	N/A	Cancelled	N/A	Hallenstadion, Zürich

=== Semifinals ===
23 May 2020; 14:20	N/A (Highest seed)	Cancelled	N/A (Lowest seed)	Hallenstadion, Zürich

23 May 2020; 18:20	N/A (Second seed)	Cancelled	N/A (Third seed)	Hallenstadion, Zürich

=== Bronze medal game ===
24 May 2020; 15:20	N/A (LSF1)	Cancelled	N/A (LSF2)	Hallenstadion, Zürich

=== Gold medal game ===
24 May 2020; 20:20	N/A (WSF1)	Cancelled	N/A (WSF2)	Hallenstadion, Zürich
