= Ice Hockey European Championships =

International ice hockey competition for national teams

Ice Hockey European Championship
- Genre: Sports event
- Date: January–March
- Frequency: Annual
- Location: Various
- Inaugurated: 1910
- Most recent: 1991
- Organiser: IIHF

The Ice Hockey European Championship was an annual ice hockey tournament for European countries associated with the International Ice Hockey Federation. A total of 66 European Champions were crowned in between 1910 and 1991.

Independent championship tournaments were organized between 1910 and 1927, and again in 1929 and 1932. The 1928 European Championships medals were awarded to the European participants of the Olympic tournament in St. Moritz. After 1932, the European Championship was awarded to the top European team among the participants in the Ice Hockey World Championships. Until 1970, the final standings for the European Championship was determined simply by where European teams placed in the World Championships. Starting in 1971, a separate final standings was maintained, determined by using only the games played between European teams at the World Championships.

Between 1954 and 1991, in all but six tournaments, the only three teams to medal were the Soviets, Czechoslovakia, and Sweden. The Soviets led all European countries with 27 championships in that span.

There were no European (or World) Championships awarded in the Olympic years of 1980, 1984 and 1988.

== Results ==
Year	Gold	Silver	Bronze	Venue
1910	Great Britain	(German Empire) Germany	Belgium	Les Avants, Switzerland
1911	Bohemia	(German Empire) Germany	Belgium	(German Empire) Berlin, Germany
1912	Tournament declared null and void			Prague, Austria-Hungary
1913	Belgium	Bohemia	(German Empire) Germany	(German Empire) Munich, Germany
1914	Bohemia	(German Empire) Germany	Belgium	(German Empire) Berlin, Germany
No Championship held in 1915-1920 due to World War I
1921	Sweden	Czechoslovakia	only two teams entered	Stockholm, Sweden
1922	Czechoslovakia	Sweden	Switzerland	St. Moritz, Switzerland
1923	Sweden	France	Czechoslovakia	Antwerp, Belgium
1924	France	Sweden	Switzerland	Milan, Italy
1925	Czechoslovakia	Austria	Switzerland	Štrbské Pleso / Starý Smokovec, Czechoslovakia
1926	Switzerland	Czechoslovakia	Austria	Davos, Switzerland
1927	Austria	Belgium	Germany	Vienna, Austria
1929	Czechoslovakia	Poland	Austria	Budapest, Hungary
1932	Sweden	Austria	Switzerland	Berlin, Germany

Notes
- Prague 1912: Championship was declared null and void as Austria was not a member of the IIHF at the time of the competition (1. Bohemia, 2. Germany, 3. Austria).
- Berlin 1932 was the last separate IIHF European Championship event.
- European Championship medals were awarded to the European participants of the IIHF World Championships until 1991.

== European medalists from combined events ==
Year	Gold	Silver	Bronze
1928	Sweden	Switzerland	Great Britain
1930	Germany	Switzerland	Austria
1931	Austria	Poland	Czechoslovakia
1933	Czechoslovakia	Austria	Germany; Switzerland
1934	Germany	Switzerland	Czechoslovakia
1935	Switzerland	Great Britain	Czechoslovakia
1936	Great Britain	Czechoslovakia	Germany; Sweden
1937	Great Britain	Switzerland	Germany
1938	Great Britain	Czechoslovakia	Germany
1939	Switzerland	Czechoslovakia	Germany
1947	Czechoslovakia	Sweden	Austria
1948	Czechoslovakia	Switzerland	Sweden
1949	Czechoslovakia	Sweden	Switzerland
1950	Switzerland	Great Britain	Sweden
1951	Sweden	Switzerland	Norway
1952	Sweden	Czechoslovakia	Switzerland
1953	Sweden	West Germany	Switzerland
1954	Soviet Union	Sweden	Czechoslovakia
1955	Soviet Union	Czechoslovakia	Sweden
1956	Soviet Union	Sweden	Czechoslovakia
1957	Sweden	Soviet Union	Czechoslovakia
1958	Soviet Union	Sweden	Czechoslovakia
1959	Soviet Union	Czechoslovakia	Sweden
1960	Soviet Union	Czechoslovakia	Sweden
1961	Czechoslovakia	Soviet Union	Sweden
1962	Sweden	Finland	Norway
1963	Soviet Union	Sweden	Czechoslovakia
1964	Soviet Union	Sweden	Czechoslovakia
1965	Soviet Union	Czechoslovakia	Sweden
1966	Soviet Union	Czechoslovakia	East Germany
1967	Soviet Union	Sweden	Czechoslovakia
1968	Soviet Union	Czechoslovakia	Sweden
1969	Soviet Union	Sweden	Czechoslovakia
1970	Soviet Union	Sweden	Czechoslovakia
1971	Czechoslovakia	Soviet Union	Sweden
1972	Czechoslovakia	Soviet Union	Sweden
1973	Soviet Union	Sweden	Czechoslovakia
1974	Soviet Union	Czechoslovakia	Sweden
1975	Soviet Union	Czechoslovakia	Sweden
1976	Czechoslovakia	Sweden	Soviet Union
1977	Czechoslovakia	Sweden	Soviet Union
1978	Soviet Union	Czechoslovakia	Sweden
1979	Soviet Union	Czechoslovakia	Sweden
1981	Soviet Union	Sweden	Czechoslovakia
1982	Soviet Union	Sweden	Czechoslovakia
1983	Soviet Union	Czechoslovakia	Sweden
1985	Soviet Union	Czechoslovakia	Finland
1986	Soviet Union	Sweden	Finland
1987	Soviet Union	Czechoslovakia	Finland
1989	Soviet Union	Czechoslovakia	Sweden
1990	Sweden	Soviet Union	Czechoslovakia
1991	Soviet Union	Sweden	Finland

Notes
- Only first-round games in the World Championships were used for the European rankings.
- In 1972 and 1976 there was a world tournament separate from the olympics.

== Medal table ==
#	Team	Gold	Silver	Bronze	Total
1	Soviet Union	27	5	2	34
2	Bohemia / Czechoslovakia	14	21	17	52
	Bohemia	2	1	0	3
	Czechoslovakia	12	20	17	49
3	Sweden	10	19	17	46
4	Switzerland	4	6	8	18
5	Great Britain	4	2	1	7
6	Germany / West Germany	2	4	7	13
	Germany	2	3	7	12
	West Germany	0	1	0	1
7	Austria	2	3	4	9
8	Belgium	1	1	3	5
9	France	1	1	0	2
10	Poland	0	2	0	2
11	Finland	0	1	4	5
12	Norway	0	0	2	2
13	East Germany	0	0	1	1

== Medals 1910-1991 (including precursors) ==
Rank	Nation	Gold	Silver	Bronze	Total
1	Soviet Union	27	5	2	34
2	Czechoslovakia	14	21	17	52
3	Sweden	10	19	17	46
4	Switzerland	4	6	8	18
5	Great Britain	4	2	1	7
6	Germany	2	4	8	14
7	Austria	2	3	4	9
8	Belgium	1	1	3	5
9	France	1	1	0	2
10	Poland	0	2	0	2
11	Finland	0	1	4	5
12	Norway	0	0	2	2
Totals (12 entries)		65	65	66	196

- 1921 no bronze + 1933 and 1936 shared bronze.
- 13 editions + 52 from other events.

== See also ==
- Euro Hockey Tour
- IIHF European Women Championships
- IIHF European Junior Championships
- IIHF European Women's Champions Cup
- European Women's Hockey League
- Spengler Cup
- 2023–24 Euro Hockey Tour (women)
- Euro Hockey Challenge
- Euro Ice Hockey Challenge
- IIHF European Cup (1965-1996)
- European Hockey League (1996-2000)
- Champions Hockey League (2008–09)
- European Trophy (2010-2013)
- Champions Hockey League (since 2014)
- IIHF Continental Cup
- Junior Club World Cup
- European Women's Hockey League
- 2023–24 Euro Hockey Tour (women)
- European Curling Championships
- European Bandy Championships
