= Austria men's national ice hockey team =

Austria
- Nickname: Die Adler
- Association: Österreichischer Eishockeyverband
- General manager: Tamara Steiner
- Head coach: Roger Bader
- Assistants: Christoph Brandner; Kirk Furey
- Captain: Peter Schneider
- Most games: Gerhard Unterluggauer (199)
- Top scorer: Rudolf König (94)
- Most points: Rudolf König (183)
- Team colors
- IIHF code: AUT
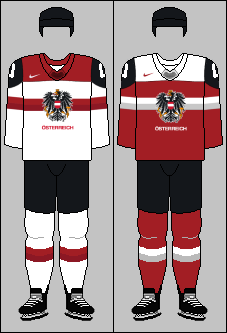

Ranking
- Current IIHF: 12 ▼1 (3 June 2026)
- Highest IIHF: 11 (2004, 2025)
- Lowest IIHF: 18 (2021)

First international
- Bohemia 5–0 Austria-Hungary (Prague, Austria-Hungary; 4 February 1912)

Biggest win
- Austria 30–0 Belgium (Stockholm, Sweden; 12 March 1963)

Biggest defeat
- Canada 23–0 Austria (Cortina d'Ampezzo, Italy; 27 January 1956)

Olympics
- Appearances: 13 (first in 1928)

IIHF World Championships
- Appearances: 68 (first in 1930)
- Best result: (bronze) (1931, 1947)

European Championships
- Appearances: 7 (first in 1912)
- Best result: (gold) (1927)

International record (W–L–T)
- 451–617–84

Austria men's national ice hockey team
Medal record

World Championships
Bronze medal – third place	1931 Poland	
Bronze medal – third place	1947 Czechoslovakia	

European Championships
Gold medal – first place	1927 Austria	

The Austrian men's national hockey team is the national ice hockey team for Austria. The team is controlled by Österreichischer Eishockeyverband. As of 2022 the Austrian team is ranked 18th in the IIHF World Rankings. Austria has not won a medal in a major tournament since 1947. Austria currently has 8,799 registered players (0.1% of the total population).

== Tournament record ==
=== Olympic Games ===
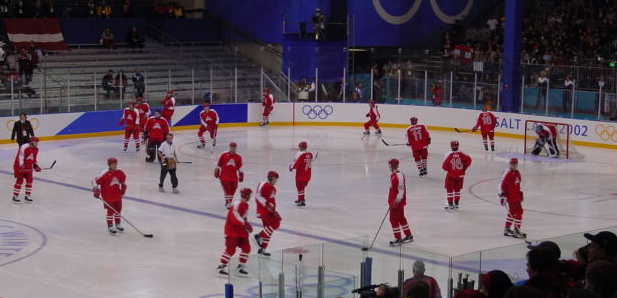
Members of the Austrian national team at the 2002 Winter Olympics. Austria finished 12th in the tournament.

Games	Finish
(Switzerland) 1928 St. Moritz	6th place
(Germany) 1936 Garmisch-Partenkirchen	7th place
(Switzerland) 1948 St. Moritz	7th place
(Italy) 1956 Cortina d'Ampezzo	10th place
(Austria) 1964 Innsbruck	13th place
(France) 1968 Grenoble	13th place
(Austria) 1976 Innsbruck	8th place
(Socialist Federal Republic of Yugoslavia) 1984 Sarajevo	10th place
(Canada) 1988 Calgary	9th place
(Norway) 1994 Lillehammer	12th place
(Japan) 1998 Nagano	14th place
(United States) 2002 Salt Lake City	12th place
(Russia) 2014 Sochi	10th place

=== World Championship ===
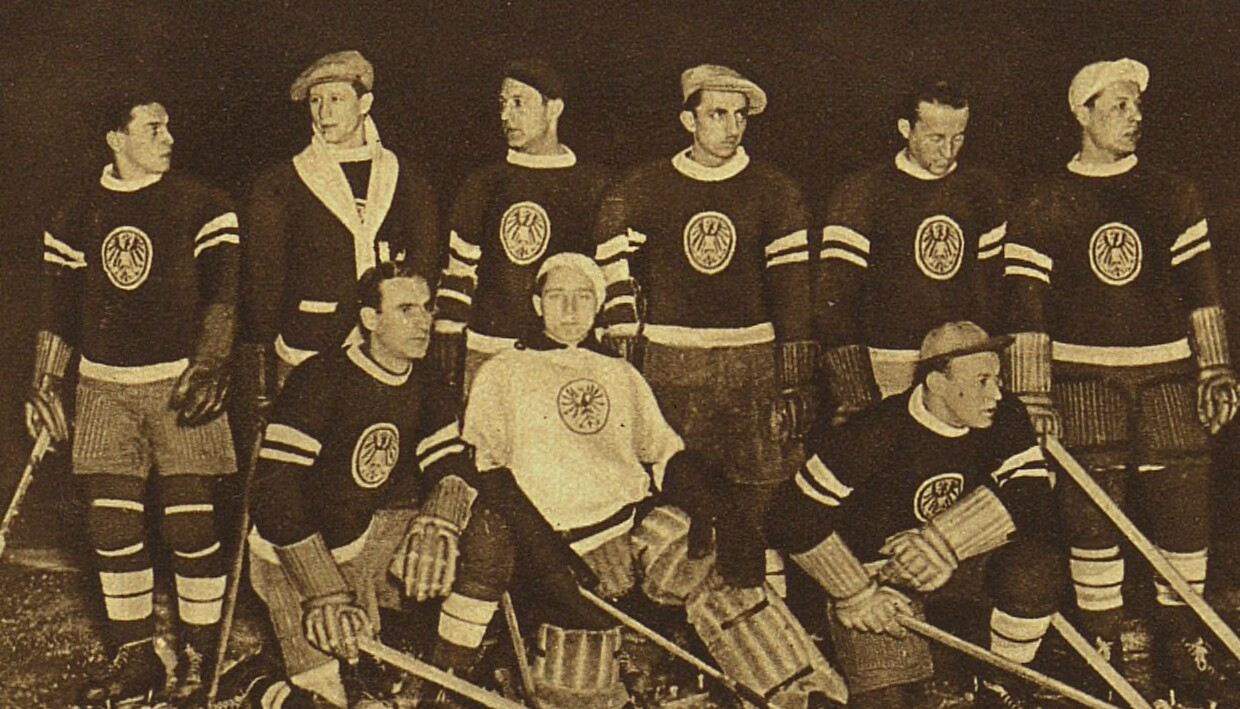
Austrian national team during 1933 World Championships

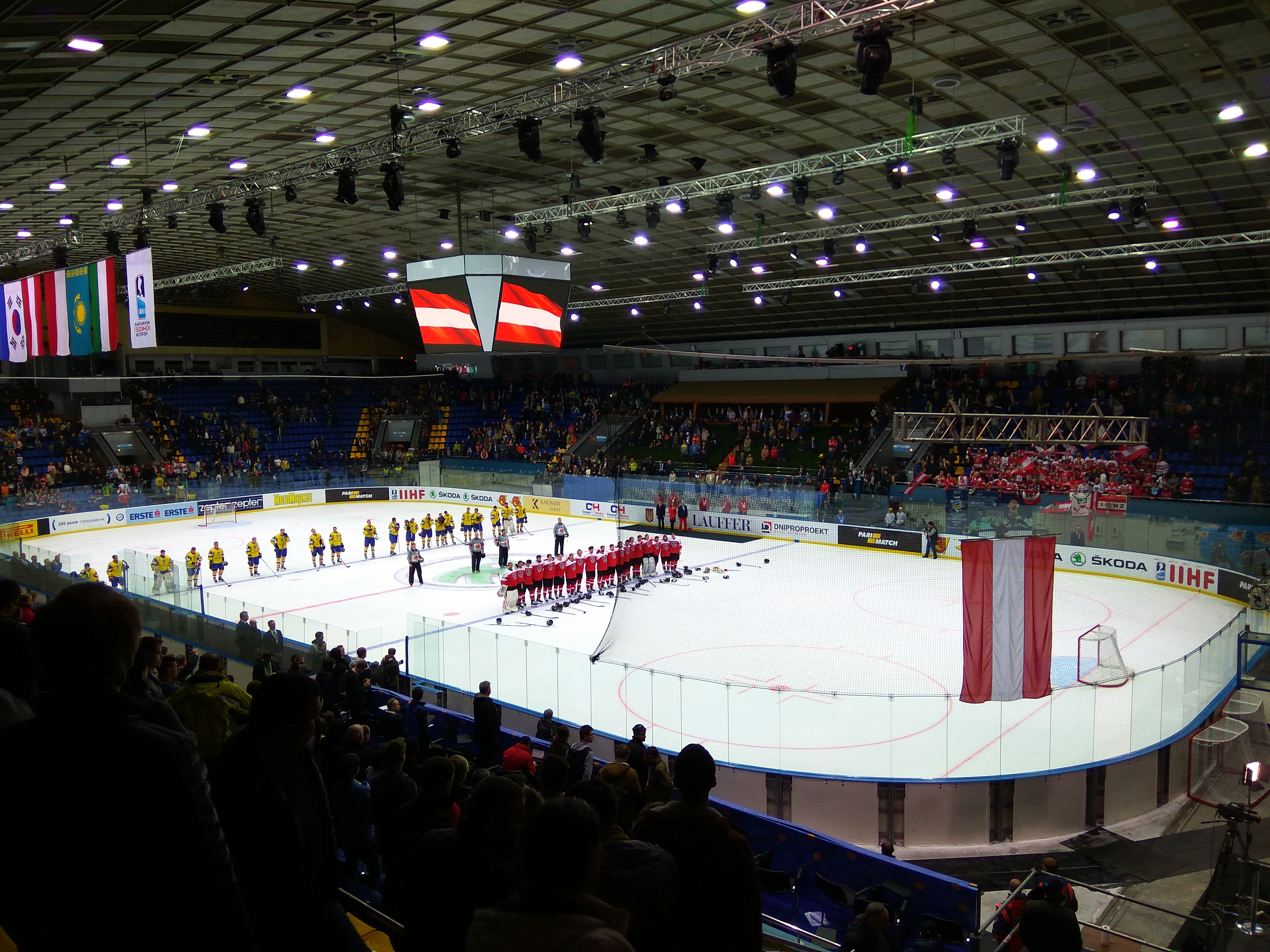
Austria at 2017 IIHF World Championship Division I

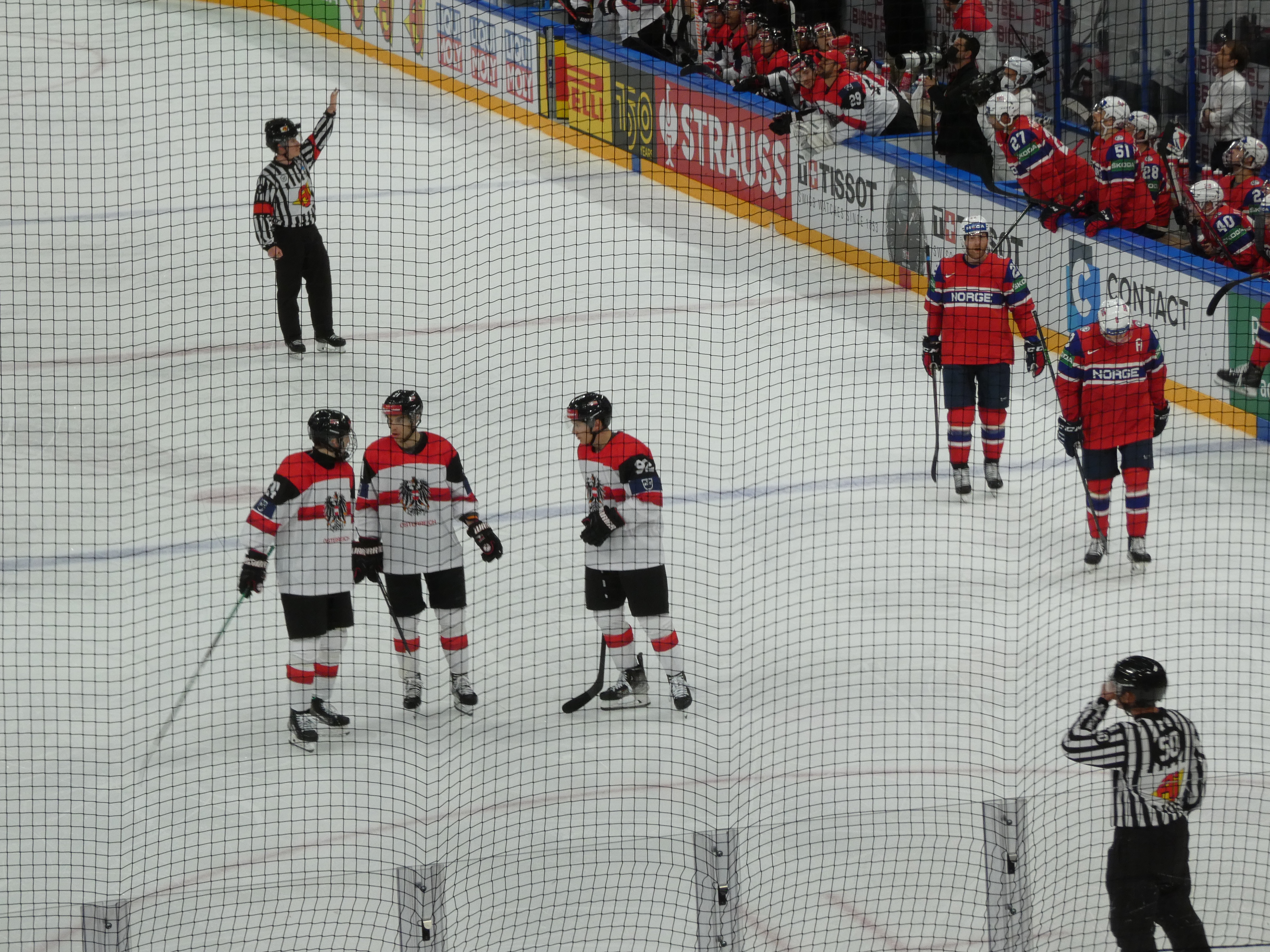
Austria against Norway during the 2022 IIHF World Championship

- 1930 – Finished in 4th place
- 1931 – Won bronze medal
- 1933 – Finished in 4th place
- 1934 – Finished in 7th place
- 1935 – Finished in 6th place
- 1938 – Finished tied in 10th place
- 1947 – Won bronze medal
- 1949 – Finished in 6th place
- 1951 – Finished in 11th place (4th in Pool B)
- 1952 – Finished in 11th place (2nd in Pool B)
- 1953 – Finished in 6th place (3rd in Pool B)
- 1955 – Finished in 11th place (2nd in Pool B)
- 1957 – Finished in 7th place
- 1959 – Finished in 15th place (3rd in Pool B)
- 1961 – Finished in 14th place (6th in Pool B)
- 1962 – Finished in 10th place (2nd in Pool B)
- 1963 – Finished in 16th place (won Pool C)
- 1965 – Finished in 13th place (5th in Pool B)
- 1966 – Finished in 13th place (5th in Pool B)
- 1967 – Finished in 14th place (6th in Pool B)
- 1969 – Finished in 13th place (7th in Pool B)
- 1970 – Finished in 15th place (won Pool C)
- 1971 – Finished in 13th place (7th in Pool B)
- 1972 – Finished in 14th place (won Pool C)
- 1973 – Finished in 12th place (6th in Pool B)
- 1974 – Finished in 14th place (8th in Pool B)
- 1975 – Finished in 17th place (3rd in Pool C)
- 1976 – Finished in 17th place (won Pool C)
- 1977 – Finished in 17th place (9th in Pool B)
- 1978 – Finished in 18th place (2nd in Pool C)
- 1979 – Finished in 15th place (7th in Pool B)
- 1981 – Finished in 17th place (won Pool C)
- 1982 – Finished in 10th place (2nd in Pool B)
- 1983 – Finished in 11th place (3rd in Pool B)
- 1985 – Finished in 12th place (4th in Pool B)
- 1986 – Finished in 14th place (6th in Pool B)
- 1987 – Finished in 11th place (3rd in Pool B)
- 1989 – Finished in 14th place (6th in Pool B)
- 1990 – Finished in 11th place (3rd in Pool B)
- 1991 – Finished in 13th place (5th in Pool B)
- 1992 – Finished in 13th place (won Pool B)
- 1993 – Finished in 11th place
- 1994 – Finished in 8th place
- 1995 – Finished in 11th place
- 1996 – Finished in 12th place
- 1997 – Finished in 16th place (4th in Pool B)

Division	Championship	Coach	Captain	Finish	Rank
Top Division	(Switzerland) 1998 Zürich/Basel	–	–	First round	15th
Top Division	(Norway) 1999 Oslo/Hamar/Lillehammer	–	–	Consolation round	10th
Top Division	(Russia) 2000 Saint Petersburg	–	–	Relegation round	13th
Top Division	(Germany) 2001 Nuremberg/Cologne/Hanover	–	–	Second round	11th
Top Division	(Sweden) 2002 Gothenburg/Karlstad/Jönköping	–	–	Second round	12th
Top Division	(Finland) 2003 Helsinki/Tampere/Turku	–	–	Second round	10th
Top Division	(Czech Republic) 2004 Prague/Ostrava	–	–	Qualifying round	11th
Top Division	(Austria) 2005 Vienna/Innsbruck	–	–	relegated	15th
Division I	(Estonia) 2006 Tallinn	–	–	Promoted	1st in Group B
Top Division	(Russia) 2007 Moscow	–	–	relegated	15th
Division I	(Austria) 2008 Innsbruck	–	–	Promoted	1st in Group A
Top Division	(Switzerland) 2009 Bern/Kloten	–	–	relegated	14th
Division I	(Netherlands) 2010 Tilburg	–	–	Promoted	1st in Group A
Top Division	(Slovakia) 2011 Bratislava/Košice	–	–	relegated	15th
Division I	(Slovenia) 2012 Ljubljana	–	–	Promoted	2nd in Group A
Top Division	(Sweden) (Finland) 2013 Stockholm/Helsinki	–	–	relegated	15th
Division I	(South Korea) 2014 Goyang	–	–	Promoted	2nd in Group A
Top Division	(Czech Republic) 2015 Prague/Ostrava	–	–	relegated	15th
Division I	(Poland) 2016 Katowice	–	–	Group stage	4th in Group A
Division I	(Ukraine) 2017 Kyiv	–	–	Promoted	1st in Group A
Top Division	(Denmark) 2018 Copenhagen/Herning	–	–	Group stage	14th
Top Division	(Slovakia) 2019 Bratislava/Košice	–	–	relegated	16th
Division I	(Slovenia) 2020 Ljubljana	Cancelled due to the COVID-19 pandemic			
Division I	(Slovenia) 2021 Ljubljana	Cancelled due to the COVID-19 pandemic			
Top Division	(Finland) 2022 Tampere/Helsinki	–	–	Group stage	11th
Top Division	(Finland) (Latvia) 2023 Tampere/Riga	–	–	Group stage	14th
Top Division	(Czech Republic) 2024 Prague/Ostrava	–	–	Group stage	10th
Top Division	(Sweden) (Denmark) 2025 Stockholm/Herning	–	–	Playoff round	8th
Top Division	(Switzerland) 2026 Zurich/Fribourg	–	–	Group stage	11th
Top Division	(Germany) 2027 Düsseldorf/Mannheim				

=== European Championship ===
Games	GP	W	T	L	GF	GA	Coach	Captain	Finish	Rank
(Switzerland) 1910 Les Avants	did not participate.									
(German Empire) 1911 Berlin	did not participate.									
(Austria-Hungary) 1912 Prague*	2	0	0	2	1	9	?	?	Round-robin	3rd place, bronze medalist(s)
(German Empire) 1913 Munich	3	0	0	3	5	34	?	?	Round-robin	4th
(German Empire) 1914 Berlin	did not participate.									
1915–1920	No Championships (World War I).									
(Sweden) 1921 Stockholm	did not participate.									
(Switzerland) 1922 St. Moritz	did not participate.									
(Belgium) 1923 Antwerp	did not participate.									
(Italy) 1924 Milan	did not participate.									
(Czechoslovakia) 1925 Štrbské Pleso, Starý Smokovec	3	1	1	1	4	5	?	?	Round-robin	2nd place, silver medalist(s)
(Switzerland) 1926 Davos	7	4	1	2	15	13	?	?	Final round	3rd place, bronze medalist(s)
(Austria) 1927 Vienna	5	5	0	0	13	2	?	?	Round-robin	1st place, gold medalist(s)
(Hungary) 1929 Budapest	6	4	0	2	13	9	?	?	3rd Place Game	3rd place, bronze medalist(s)
(Germany) 1932 Berlin	4	1	3	0	6	3	?	?	Final round	2nd place, silver medalist(s)

- 1912 Championship was later annulled because Austria was not a member of the IIHF at the time of the competition.

== Team ==
=== Current roster ===
Roster for the 2026 IIHF World Championship.

Head coach: (Switzerland) Roger Bader

No.	Pos.	Name	Height	Weight	Birthdate	Team
3	F	Peter Schneider – C	1.83 m (6 ft 0 in)	91 kg (201 lb)	4 April 1991 (age 35)	(Austria) Red Bull Salzburg
4	D	Ramon Schnetzer	1.78 m (5 ft 10 in)	83 kg (183 lb)	12 August 1996 (age 30)	(Austria) Pioneers Vorarlberg
5	D	Dominic Hackl	1.87 m (6 ft 2 in)	91 kg (201 lb)	8 November 1996 (age 29)	(Austria) Vienna Capitals
8	F	Maximilian Rebernig	1.93 m (6 ft 4 in)	103 kg (227 lb)	3 September 2000 (age 26)	(Austria) EC VSV
9	F	Leon Wallner	1.85 m (6 ft 1 in)	89 kg (196 lb)	1 July 2002 (age 24)	(Austria) Vienna Capitals
12	D	David Maier	1.87 m (6 ft 2 in)	86 kg (190 lb)	12 January 2000 (age 26)	(Austria) EC KAC
14	F	Henrik Neubauer	1.84 m (6 ft 0 in)	90 kg (200 lb)	15 April 1997 (age 29)	(Austria) Steinbach Black Wings Linz
16	F	Dominic Zwerger	1.83 m (6 ft 0 in)	93 kg (205 lb)	16 July 1996 (age 30)	(Switzerland) HC Ambrì-Piotta
17	F	Ian Scherzer	1.81 m (5 ft 11 in)	89 kg (196 lb)	3 July 2005 (age 21)	(United States) RPI Engineers
18	D	Paul Stapelfeldt	1.97 m (6 ft 6 in)	100 kg (220 lb)	20 September 1998 (age 28)	(Austria) Graz 99ers
19	F	Vinzenz Rohrer	1.78 m (5 ft 10 in)	73 kg (161 lb)	9 September 2004 (age 22)	(Canada) Laval Rocket
30	G	David Kickert	1.88 m (6 ft 2 in)	83 kg (183 lb)	16 March 1994 (age 32)	(Austria) Red Bull Salzburg
32	D	Bernd Wolf – A	1.78 m (5 ft 10 in)	84 kg (185 lb)	23 February 1997 (age 29)	(Switzerland) EHC Kloten
33	G	Florian Vorauer	1.88 m (6 ft 2 in)	81 kg (179 lb)	9 December 1999 (age 26)	(Austria) EC KAC
35	G	Atte Tolvanen	1.82 m (6 ft 0 in)	87 kg (192 lb)	23 November 1994 (age 31)	(Austria) Red Bull Salzburg
40	F	Tim Harnisch	1.79 m (5 ft 10 in)	81 kg (179 lb)	18 April 2001 (age 25)	(Austria) Graz 99ers
45	D	Gregor Biber	1.90 m (6 ft 3 in)	89 kg (196 lb)	9 August 2006 (age 20)	(Sweden) Rögle BK
48	F	Lucas Thaler	1.80 m (5 ft 11 in)	80 kg (180 lb)	21 January 2002 (age 24)	(Austria) Red Bull Salzburg
52	F	Paul Huber	1.93 m (6 ft 4 in)	101 kg (223 lb)	10 June 2000 (age 26)	(Austria) Graz 99ers
61	F	Simeon Schwinger	1.82 m (6 ft 0 in)	75 kg (165 lb)	7 October 1997 (age 28)	(Austria) EC KAC
70	F	Benjamin Nissner	1.82 m (6 ft 0 in)	80 kg (180 lb)	30 November 1997 (age 28)	(Austria) Red Bull Salzburg
78	D	Thimo Nickl	1.91 m (6 ft 3 in)	87 kg (192 lb)	4 December 2001 (age 24)	(Austria) EC KAC
81	F	Leon Kolarik	1.80 m (5 ft 11 in)	80 kg (180 lb)	23 September 2007 (age 19)	(Canada) Peterborough Petes
92	D	Clemens Unterweger – A	1.83 m (6 ft 0 in)	91 kg (201 lb)	1 April 1992 (age 34)	(Austria) EC KAC
96	F	Mario Huber	1.88 m (6 ft 2 in)	90 kg (200 lb)	8 August 1996 (age 30)	(Austria) Red Bull Salzburg

=== Notable players ===
- Reinhard Divis
- Michael Grabner
- Derek Holmes, player-coach in the 1960s
- Andreas Nödl
- Thomas Pöck
- Michael Raffl
- Thomas Vanek

== All-time record ==
Updated as of match played on 6 November 2025. Teams listed in italics are defunct.

Opponent	Played	Won	Drawn	Lost	GF	GA	GD
Australia	1	1	0	0	17	0	+17
Belarus	22	5	1	16	50	83	-33
Belgium	13	12	0	1	106	36	+70
Bohemia	2	0	0	2	0	12	-12
Bulgaria	10	8	1	1	58	18	+40
Canada	40	1	3	36	46	235	-189
China	8	7	1	0	66	20	+46
Croatia	2	2	0	0	11	2	+9
Czech Republic	27	2	0	25	35	130	−95
Czechoslovakia	28	4	0	24	37	168	−131
Denmark	44	30	1	13	175	95	+80
East Germany	28	6	0	22	71	182	-111
Estonia	2	2	0	0	9	3	+6
Finland	16	1	1	14	28	80	−52
France	69	36	10	23	264	190	+74
Germany	57	15	4	38	91	187	-96
Great Britain	21	13	2	6	103	61	+42
Hungary	57	40	2	15	215	141	+74
Italy	97	46	12	39	298	277	+21
Japan	45	26	5	14	176	130	+46
Kazakhstan	13	4	1	8	35	41	-6
Latvia	28	5	0	23	65	106	-41
Lithuania	2	2	0	0	11	5	+6
Netherlands	37	26	4	7	198	89	+109
North Korea	1	1	0	0	10	0	+10
Norway	55	19	5	31	143	198	-55
Poland	60	31	3	26	181	183	-2
Romania	29	13	2	14	130	104	+26
Russia	17	1	0	16	29	95	−66
Serbia	1	1	0	0	13	0	+24
Slovakia	46	9	2	35	82	178	-96
Slovenia	40	16	4	20	87	110	-23
South Korea	7	6	0	1	37	16	+21
Soviet Union	4	0	0	4	5	54	-49
Spain	1	1	0	0	14	4	+10
Sweden	26	1	2	23	24	127	−103
Switzerland	78	12	14	52	192	346	-154
Ukraine	20	13	1	6	67	52	+15
United States	33	2	2	29	58	172	−114
Yugoslavia	39	22	0	17	154	134	+20
Total	1 126	442	83	601	3 391	4 062	-672

== Uniform evolution ==
National team jerseys

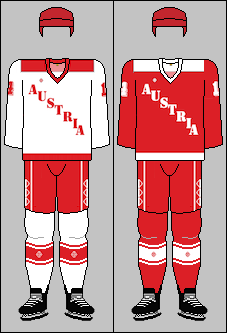
1988 Olympic jerseys

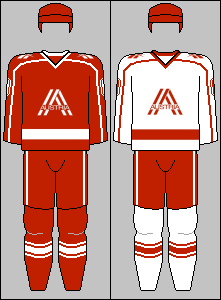
1994 Olympic jerseys

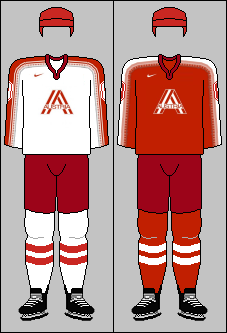
IIHF jerseys 1998–2004

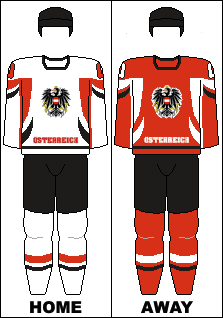
former IIHF jerseys

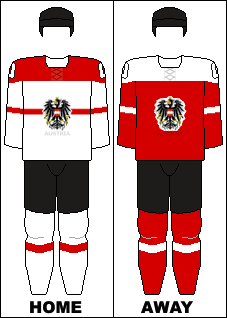
2014 Olympic jerseys

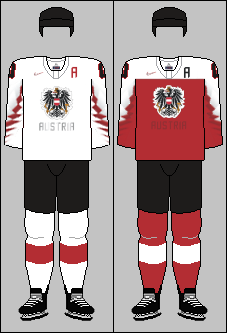
2018–2021 IIHF jerseys

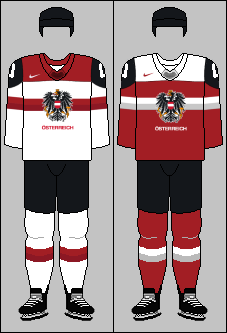
2022– IIHF jerseys
