= Ice hockey in Germany =

- Federation: Deutscher Eishockey-Bund
- Established: 1963 (From 1912 to 1962 the Deutschen Eissport-Verband organised)
- IIHF-member since: 11 September 1909
- First WC participation: 1930
- First Olympic participation: 1928
- Medal Wins: WC: 3xSilver, 2xBronze; OG: 1xSilver, 2xBronze
- First National Champions: 1912
- First National Champions: Berliner Schlittschuhclub
- Current National Champions: EHC Red Bull München
- Top League: Deutsche Eishockey Liga

Ice hockey in Germany is one of the more popular sports, and ranks behind Handball and football in spectator favour and meaning. Ice hockey is organized today in Germany by the Deutsche Eishockey Liga, the highest professional league, and by the Deutschen Eishockey-Bund ice hockey federation, which is the sport's federation in Germany and a member of the International Ice Hockey Federation.

There are 25,934 registered players in Germany (0.03% of its population).

The men's national ice hockey team stands seventh in the world on the current IIHF rank list.

== History ==
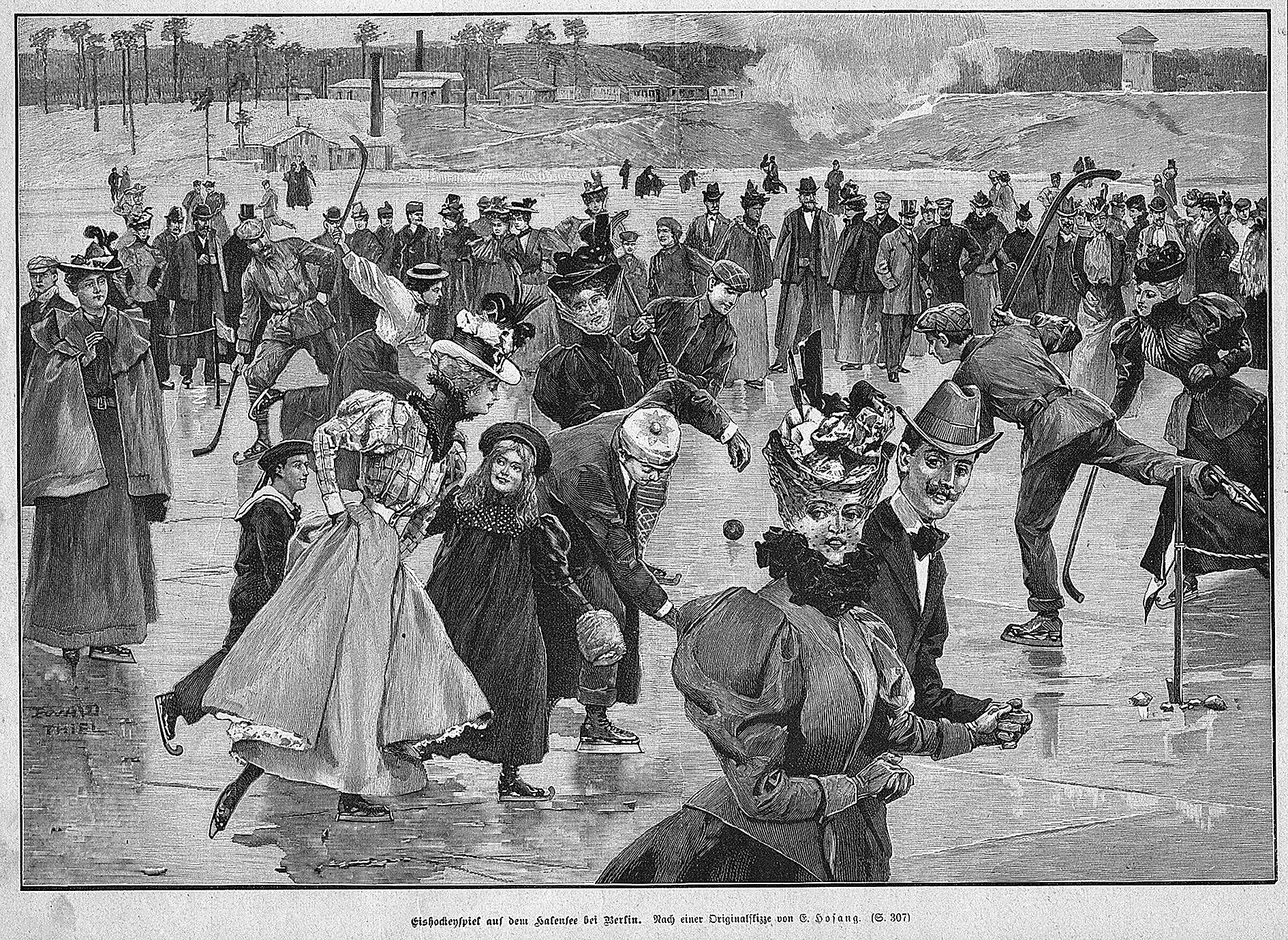
Amusement on the Halensee lake in 1898

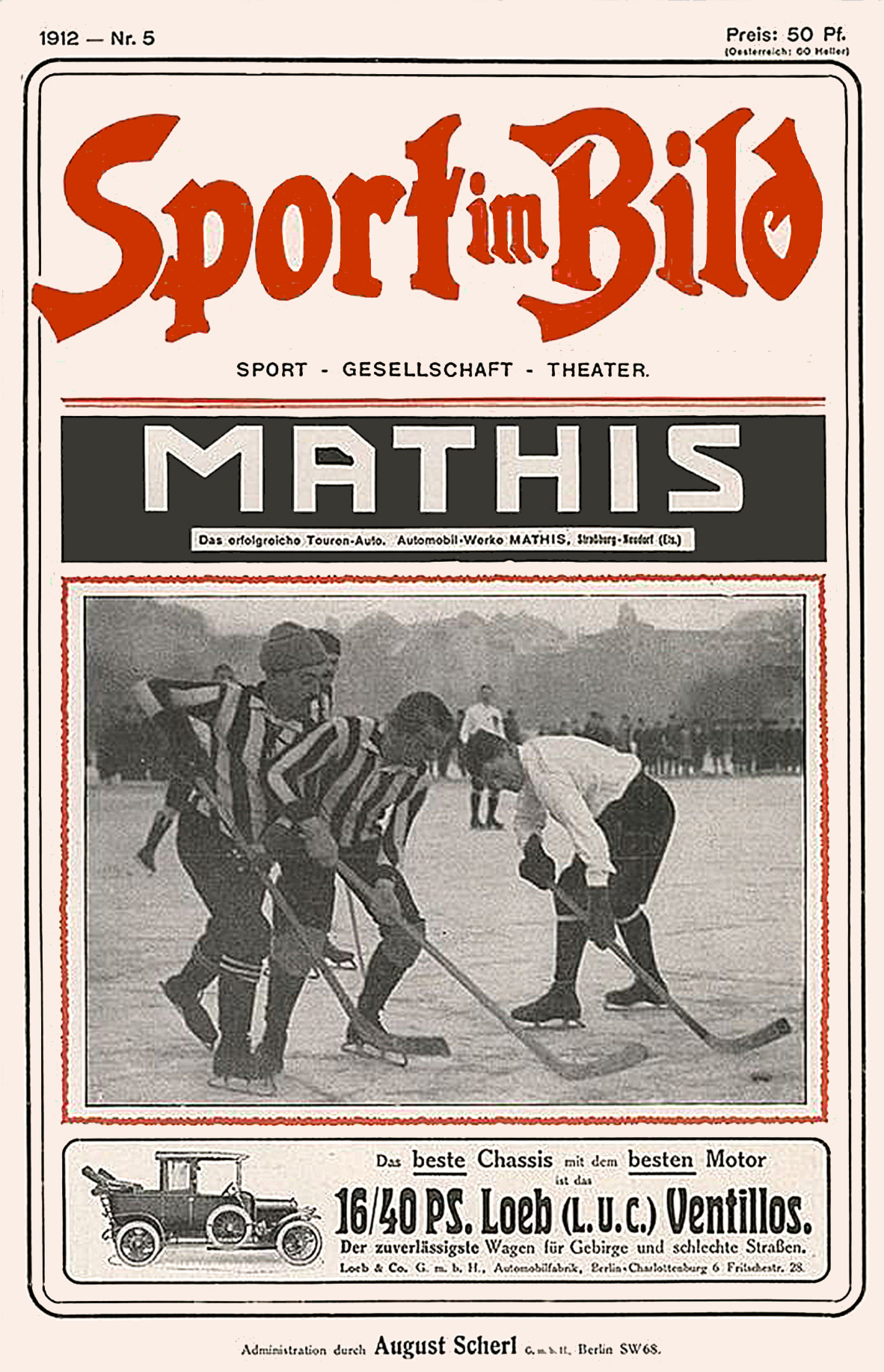
A sports magazine in 1912

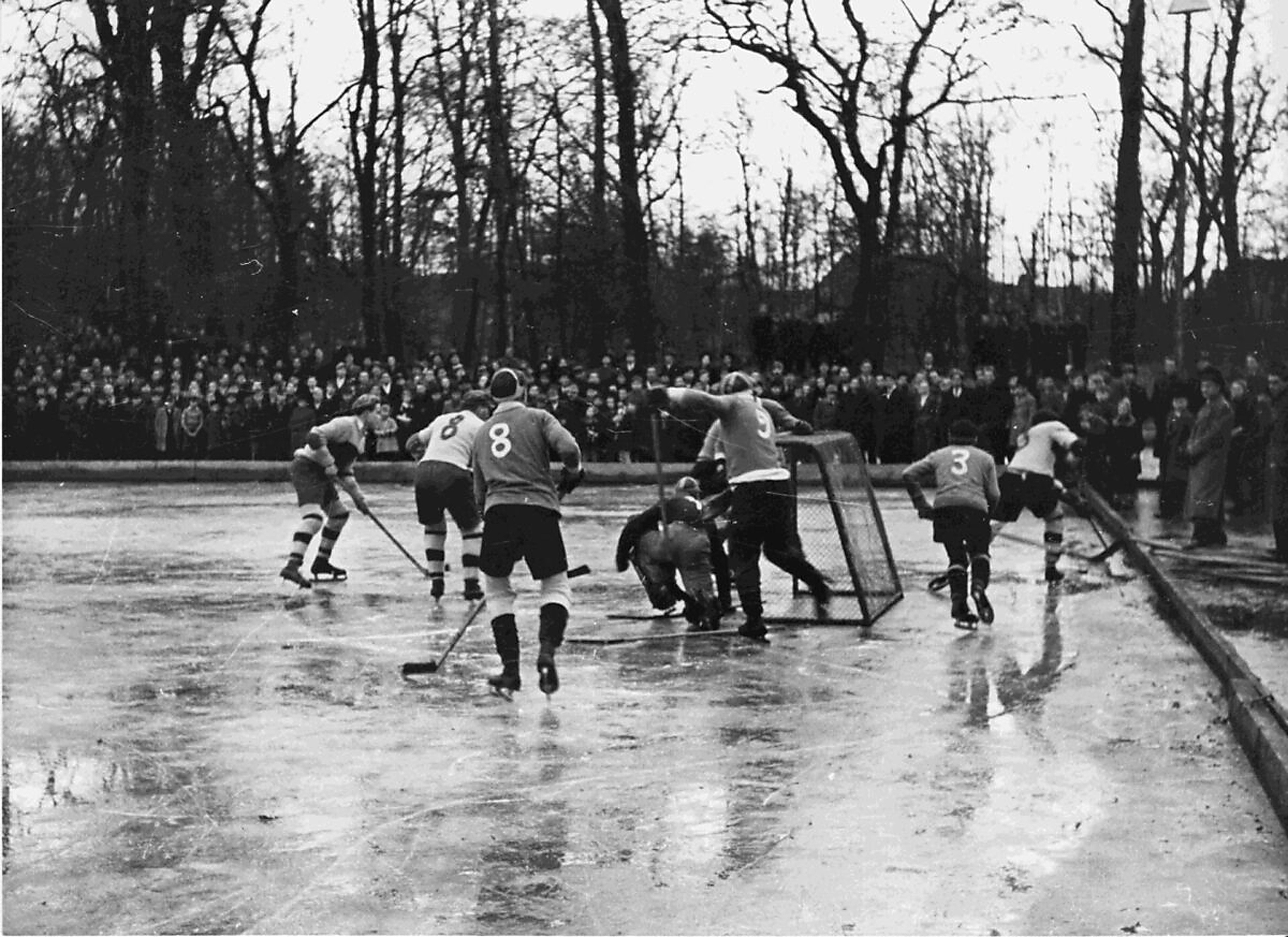
Aschaffenburg VS Darmstadt in the postwar season 1948/49

Games similar to ice hockey were popular in winter time not only in the Alps but also at lakes and rivers all over Germany for centuries. The traditional food Eisbein is named after a bone which is used for making ice skates. In 1864 the first skating club was found in Frankfurt, in the same city opened in 1881 the third artificial ice skating rink in the world (after London and Baltimore), but it was the first with a cooling system with ammonia. Even if it covered only 520 m^{2} and was operating only for advertising reasons, it was replaced 10 years later by a permanent one.

The beginning of ice hockey in Germany brought a rapid decline of the traditional German games played with a stick on ice. The first registered ice hockey game in Germany was played on February 4, 1897 on the Halensee Lake in Berlin. The participants were Akademischer SC 1893 Berlin and a team of students.

1901 saw the first German club create its own ice hockey department, the Berliner Schlittschuhclub. As a consequence, further ice hockey associations or departments developed first in Berlin and then in other large German cities. In 1908 ice hockey was taken up as section of the Deutscher Eissport-Verband. On 19 September 1909 Germany became the sixth member nation of the predecessor organization of the IIHF, the "Ligue International de Hockey sur Glace" (LIHG).

By 1910, when Germany participated in the first Ice Hockey European Championships, a city league with ten teams was already playing in Berlin. Besides the Berliner Schlittschuhclub of the BFC Preussen, the teams were the Sportclub Berlin, the Berliner Eislaufverein 1904, the BFC Britania, the Berliner EV 1886, the Hockey Club Berlin, the Sportklub Komet, the SC Charlottenburg, and the Eislauf Verein Berlin. In 1912, the first German championships were held, which the Berliner Schlittschuhclub would win.

After the First World War, Germany was excluded from the LIHG in 1920 and could thus not in any LIHG tournaments. On 11 January 1926 the Deutsche Eissport-Verband, the body responsible for ice hockey in Germany, was re-admitted to the LIHG, and Germany was once again able to participate in the European Ice-Hockey championships beginning in 1927.

Until 1940, the development of the ice hockey in Germany made great strides. At the 1932 Winter Olympics in Lake Placid, Germany attained the bronze medal, and during the European championships (then a qualifier for the Ice Hockey World Cup) won the European title in 1930 and 1934. The 1936 Winter Olympics saw a contentious issue arise when the Nazi party were forced to include a Jewish player, (Rudi Ball), on the team. Ice hockey developed further in this time period with the emergence of new regional organizations across the country.

After World War II, Germany was again excluded from the LIHG in April 1946. At this time a national league for the best teams, the Oberliga (Ice Hockey), developed in the Federal Republic, while the Soviet occupation zone, the later German Democratic Republic, took its own development. (See also: Ice Hockey in the DDR)

The Federal Republic of Germany was admitted to the LIHG on 10 March 1951; the GDR joined as an independent member with the Deutschen Eislauf-Verband der DDR on 9 June 1954.

The Oberliga was replaced 1958 by the reintroduced Ice Hockey Bundesliga, before 1963 the Deutsche Eishockey-Bund was created, which remained under the umbrella of the Deutschen Eissport-Verbandes. Internationally the national team of the FRG created the jump into the A-World Championship, where they could be established end of the 1970s and into the 1980s. However, it never ranked among the top four teams in the world.

The national team in 2018 Winter Olympics gained a silver medal.

== Tournaments and championships ==
- Championships
  - general: German Champions (ice hockey)
  - current: Deutsche Eishockey Liga, Deutsche Eishockey Liga 2, Oberliga (Ice Hockey), Regionalliga (ice hockey)
  - historical: Berliner Stadtliga, Oberliga (Ice Hockey), Bundesliga (ice hockey)
- International Tournament
  - Deutschland Cup
- Olympic Ice hockey tournament in Germany
  - 1936
- The Men's Ice Hockey World Championships in Germany
  - 1930 (in Chamonix and Berlin), 1936 (At the same Olympic Games), 1955, 1975, 1983, 1993, 2001, 2010, 2017 (co-host), (2027)
- The men's Ice Hockey European Championships in Germany
  - 1911, 1913, 1914, 1932

== National team ==
Coaches, Players and rankings of the Germany national team. See Germany National Ice Hockey Team

== Attendances ==
The average attendance per top-flight league season and the ice hockey club with the highest average attendance:

Season	League average	Best club	Best club average
2024-25	7,071	Kölner Haie	17,829

== Bibliography ==
- Eckert, Horst: Eishockey-Lexikon. München: Copress, 1993. ISBN 3-7679-0407-1. (German)
- Suckow, Christina. "Literature review on brand equity in professional team sport: a German perspective on ice hockey." International Journal of sport management and marketing 5.1-2 (2009): 211-225.
