= Maurice Deprez =

Belgian ice hockey player (1888–1953)

- Born: 12 November 1888 Brussels, Belgium
- Died: 30 August 1953 (aged 64) Etterbeek, Belgium
- Position: Centre
- Played for: CPB, Bruxelles
- National team: Belgium
- Playing career: 1908–1920
Medal record
Representing Belgium
Ice Hockey European Championships
Bronze medal – third place	1910 Les Avants	Team
Gold medal – first place	1913 Munich	Team
Bronze medal – third place	1914 Berlin	Team

Maurice Jean François Deprez (12 November 1888 – 30 August 1953) was a Belgian ice hockey player. He was the top scorer at the Ice Hockey European Championship 1913 (7 goal in 3 matches), where his team won the gold medal; he finished third at the 1910 and 1914 European Championships and fifth at the 1920 Summer Olympics.
