= Paul Goeminne =

Belgian ice hockey player

- Born: February 19, 1885 Belgium
- Died: September 22, 1952 (aged 67)
- Position: Rover
- Played for: CPB, Bruxelles
- National team: Belgium
- Playing career: 1905–1923
Medal record
Representing Belgium
Ice Hockey European Championships
| Gold medal – first place | 1913 Munich | Team |
| Bronze medal – third place | 1914 Berlin | Team |

Paul Goeminne (February 19, 1885 - September 22, 1952) was a Belgian ice hockey player. He won the 1913 European title and finished third at the 1914 European Championships and fifth at the 1920 Summer Olympics.
