= 1977 Ice Hockey World Championships =

1977 edition of the World Ice Hockey Championships

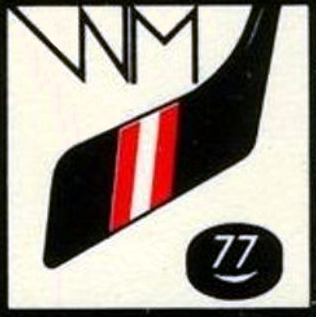

Tournament details
- Host country: Austria
- Dates: 21 April – 8 May
- Teams: 8

Final positions
- Champions: Czechoslovakia (5th title)
- Runners-up: Sweden
- Third place: Soviet Union
- Fourth place: Canada

Tournament statistics
- Games played: 40
- Goals scored: 338 (8.45 per game)
- Attendance: 171,900 (4,298 per game)
- Scoring leader: (Soviet Union) Vladimir Petrov 21 points

The 1977 Ice Hockey World Championships took place in Vienna, Austria from 21 April to 8 May. Eight teams took part, first playing each other once, then the four best teams advancing to a new round. The tournament was also the 55th ice hockey European Championship. Czechoslovakia won for the fifth time, and second in a row, claiming their 14th and final European title as well.

Canada returned after an eight-year absence with a team comprised completely of NHL players from teams that had missed the Stanley Cup playoffs. While being competitive in most games, many people were reportedly upset by the Canadians' conduct on the ice and after the games. The team refused to listen to the opposing teams' national anthems when they lost, and the coach, Johnny Wilson, explained their multiple misconduct penalties by saying, "We just couldn't compete with the Soviets, and ... it is natural to try to get revenge."

The tournament itself was very close for the medals, with a spectacular last day. Canada, with a chance still to get a bronze, set a record by defeating the eventual champions eight to two. Never before had a first place team lost a game that badly. But the Swedes, by beating the Soviets for a second time, saved the Czechoslovaks, and at the same time pushed themselves into second and Canada into fourth.

== World Championship Group A (Austria) ==
=== First round ===
Pos	Team	Pld	W	D	L	GF	GA	GD	Pts
1	Sweden	7	6	0	1	39	9	+30	12
2	Soviet Union	7	6	0	1	65	16	+49	12
3	Czechoslovakia	7	5	1	1	46	20	+26	11
4	Canada	7	4	1	2	31	25	+6	9
5	Finland	7	3	0	4	22	37	−15	6
6	United States	7	1	1	5	18	35	−17	3
7	West Germany	7	1	1	5	17	45	−28	3
8	Romania	7	0	0	7	12	63	−51	0

21 April	Canada	4–1	United States

21 April	Czechoslovakia	11–3	Finland

21 April	Soviet Union	10–0	West Germany

21 April	Sweden	8–1	Romania

22 April	Sweden	4–2	Canada

22 April	United States	7–2	Romania

22 April	Soviet Union	11–6	Finland

22 April	Czechoslovakia	9–3	West Germany

24 April	Soviet Union	11–1	Canada

24 April	Czechoslovakia	13–1	Romania

24 April	Sweden	5–1	Finland

24 April	United States	3–3	West Germany

25 April	Soviet Union	18–1	Romania

25 April	Sweden	7–1	West Germany

26 April	Finland	3–2	United States

26 April	Canada	3–3	Czechoslovakia

27 April	Canada	5–1	Finland

27 April	West Germany	6–3	Romania

28 April	Soviet Union	6–1	Czechoslovakia

28 April	Sweden	9–0	United States

29 April	Canada	9–3	West Germany

29 April	Finland	4–2	Romania

30 April	Czechoslovakia	3–1	Sweden

30 April	Soviet Union	8–2	United States

1 May	Finland	4–1	West Germany

1 May	Canada	7–2	Romania

2 May	Sweden	5–1	Soviet Union

2 May	Czechoslovakia	6–3	United States

=== Final Round 1–4 place ===
Pos	Team	Pld	W	D	L	GF	GA	GD	Pts
1	Czechoslovakia	10	7	1	2	54	32	+22	15
2	Sweden	10	7	0	3	43	19	+24	14
3	Soviet Union	10	7	0	3	77	24	+53	14
4	Canada	10	6	1	3	47	35	+12	13

4 May	Canada	7–0	Sweden

4 May	Czechoslovakia	4–3	Soviet Union

6 May	Czechoslovakia	2–1	Sweden

6 May	Soviet Union	8–1	Canada

8 May	Canada	8–2	Czechoslovakia

8 May	Sweden	3–1	Soviet Union

=== Consolation round 5–8 place ===
Pos	Team	Pld	W	D	L	GF	GA	GD	Pts
5	Finland	10	5	0	5	45	43	+2	10
6	United States	10	3	1	6	29	43	−14	7
7	West Germany	10	2	1	7	23	58	−35	5
8	Romania	10	1	0	9	20	84	−64	2

Romania was relegated to Group B.

3 May	Finland	14–1	Romania

3 May	United States	4–1	West Germany

5 May	Romania	5–4	United States

5 May	Finland	7–2	West Germany

7 May	United States	3–2	Finland

7 May	West Germany	3–2	Romania

== World Championship Group B (Japan) ==
Played in Tokyo 10–21 March. Played with nine countries because Group A had relegated two nations the previous year to make room for Canada.

Pos	Team	Pld	W	D	L	GF	GA	GD	Pts
9	East Germany	8	8	0	0	57	16	+41	16
10	Poland	8	6	0	2	39	22	+17	12
11	Japan	8	5	1	2	30	21	+9	11
12	Norway	8	4	2	2	30	30	0	10
13	Switzerland	8	4	0	4	35	33	+2	8
14	Hungary	8	3	0	5	27	46	−19	6
15	Yugoslavia	8	2	1	5	30	36	−6	5
16	Netherlands	8	1	2	5	23	39	−16	4
17	Austria	8	0	0	8	19	47	−28	0

East Germany was promoted to Group A, both the Netherlands and Austria were relegated to Group C.

10 March	Poland	4–2	Netherlands

10 March	Norway	4–2	Yugoslavia

10 March	East Germany	7–1	Austria

10 March	Japan	5–2	Hungary

11 March	Austria	4–7	Hungary

11 March	Norway	4–3	Switzerland

12 March	East Germany	7–6	Yugoslavia

12 March	Poland	5–2	Switzerland

12 March	Japan	8–2	Netherlands

13 March	Yugoslavia	6–4	Austria

13 March	Netherlands	2–8	Hungary

13 March	Japan	2–2	Norway

14 March	East Germany	9–2	Hungary

14 March	Poland	7–3	Norway

14 March	Switzerland	10–3	Austria

15 March	Poland	1–7	East Germany

15 March	Yugoslavia	5–5	Netherlands

15 March	Japan	3–2	Switzerland

16 March	Netherlands	4–3	Austria

16 March	Norway	8–2	Hungary

16 March	Japan	4–1	Yugoslavia

17 March	East Germany	10–3	Switzerland

17 March	Norway	4–2	Austria

17 March	Poland	10–0	Hungary

18 March	East Germany	4–2	Netherlands

18 March	Switzerland	5–3	Yugoslavia

18 March	Japan	2–5	Poland

19 March	Norway	4–4	Netherlands

19 March	Yugoslavia	1–3	Hungary

19 March	Japan	6–2	Austria

20 March	Switzerland	7–3	Hungary

20 March	East Germany	8–1	Norway

20 March	Poland	3–0	Austria

21 March	Switzerland	3–2	Netherlands

21 March	Japan	0–5	East Germany

21 March	Poland	4–6	Yugoslavia

== World Championship Group C (Denmark) ==
Played in Copenhagen and Hørsholm, 12–20 March. The hosts did not lose a game, outscored their opponents by forty-six, but it was not enough to win. Only one team was promoted this year so that Group B could return to having eight clubs, and their tie on the last day against Italy left them in second place. Spain made its debut in the World Championships, not having competed since the European Championships of 1926.

Pos	Team	Pld	W	D	L	GF	GA	GD	Pts
18	Italy	6	5	1	0	64	6	+58	11
19	Denmark	6	5	1	0	61	15	+46	11
20	Bulgaria	6	4	0	2	47	25	+22	8
21	France	6	3	0	3	37	24	+13	6
22	Spain	6	1	0	5	17	61	−44	2
23	Belgium	6	1	0	5	24	89	−65	2
24	Great Britain	6	1	0	5	17	47	−30	2

Italy was promoted to Group B.

12 March	Denmark	9–2	Great Britain

12 March	France	12–3	Belgium

12 March	Italy	12–0	Spain

13 March	Great Britain	3–6	France

13 March	Spain	2–14	Bulgaria

13 March	Belgium	1–21	Italy

14 March	Denmark	6–3	Bulgaria

15 March	France	2–8	Italy

15 March	Great Britain	6–5	Belgium

15 March	Denmark	14–3	Spain

16 March	France	4–6	Bulgaria

17 March	Belgium	4–17	Bulgaria

17 March	Great Britain	1–15	Italy

18 March	France	12–1	Spain

18 March	Denmark	27–4	Belgium

19 March	Italy	6–0	Bulgaria

19 March	Great Britain	2–5	Spain

19 March	Denmark	3–1	France

20 March	Belgium	7–6	Spain

20 March	Great Britain	3–7	Bulgaria

20 March	Denmark	2–2	Italy

== Ranking and statistics ==
1977 IIHF World Championship winners

Czechoslovakia
5th title

=== Tournament Awards ===
- Best players selected by the directorate:
  - Best Goaltender: (Sweden) Göran Högosta
  - Best Defenceman: (Soviet Union) Valeri Vasiliev
  - Best Forward: (Soviet Union) Helmut Balderis
- Media All-Star Team:
  - Goaltender: (Sweden) Göran Högosta
  - Defence: (Czechoslovakia) František Pospíšil, (Soviet Union) Valeri Vasiliev
  - Forwards: (Soviet Union) Helmut Balderis, (Czechoslovakia) Vladimír Martinec, (Soviet Union) Vladimir Petrov

=== Final standings ===
The final standings of the tournament according to IIHF:

1st place, gold medalist(s)	Czechoslovakia
2nd place, silver medalist(s)	Sweden
3rd place, bronze medalist(s)	Soviet Union
4	Canada
5	Finland
6	United States
7	West Germany
8	Romania

=== European championships final standings ===
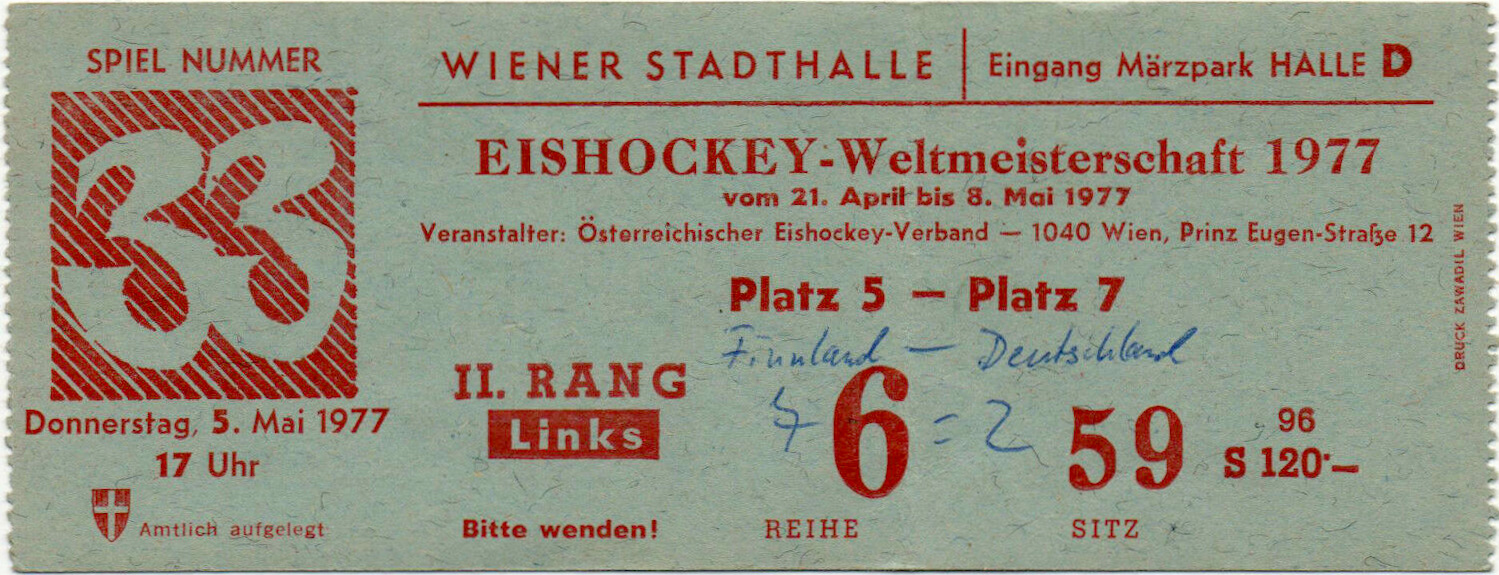
Game ticket

The final standings of the European championships according to IIHF:

Gold medal	Czechoslovakia
Silver medal	Sweden
Bronze medal	Soviet Union
4	Finland
5	West Germany
6	Romania
