= Ice hockey in the Czech Republic =

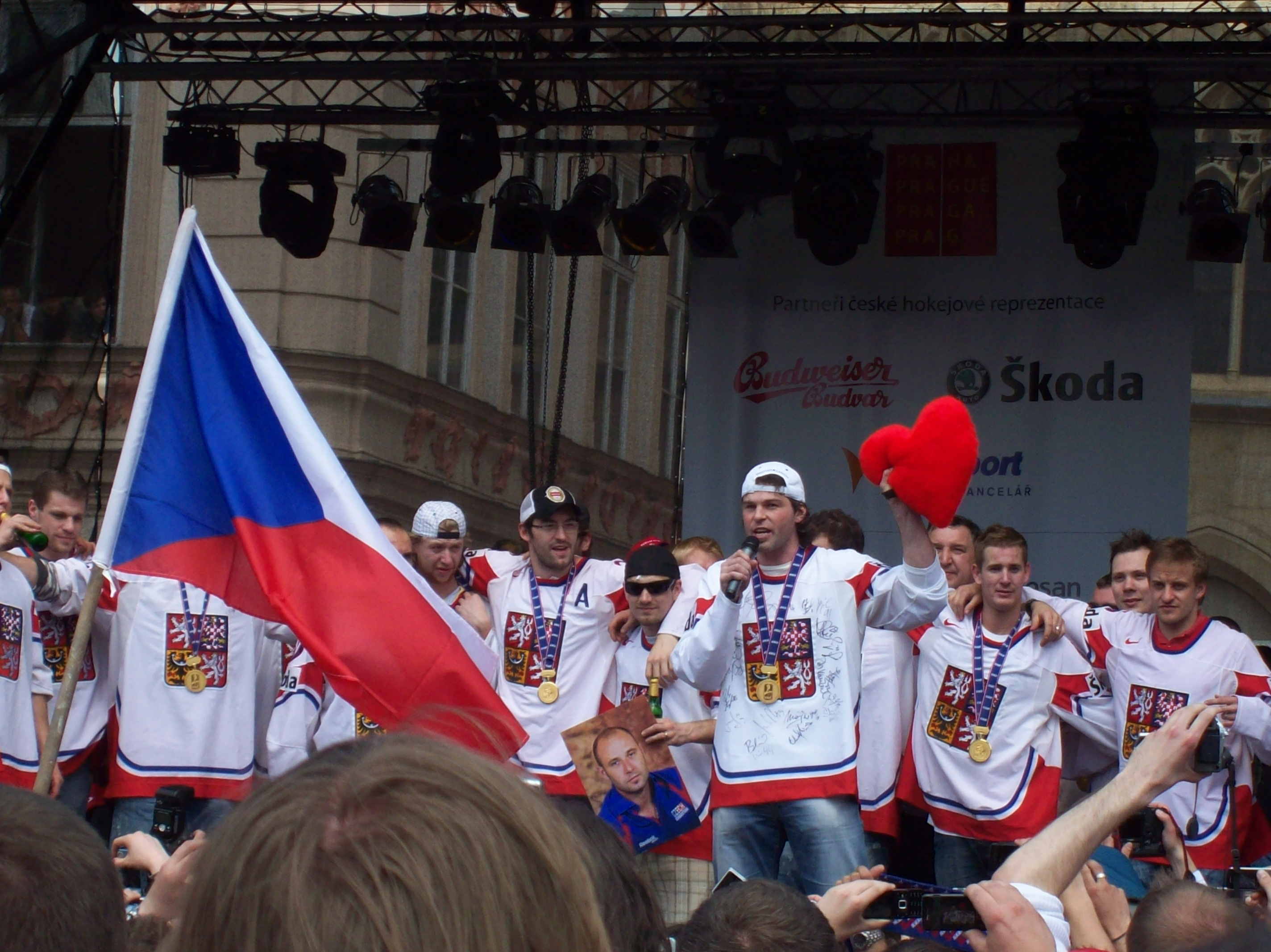
- Jaromír Jágr speaks to fans at a victory event after the Czech Republic's win at the World Championship in 2010
- Country: Czech Republic
- Governing body: Czech Ice Hockey Association
- National teams: Men's national team Women's national team

National competitions
- Czech Extraliga; Czech 1.liga Czech 2.liga

International competitions
- Ice Hockey European Championships; IIHF World Championships; Winter Olympics

Ice hockey is one of the popular sports in the Czech Republic. The Czech Ice Hockey Association is the governing body of ice hockey in the country. The Czech Republic men's national ice hockey team is a member of the so-called "Big Six", an unofficial list of major powers in world hockey.

The sport was introduced in the erstwhile Kingdom of Bohemia in the Austro-Hungarian Empire in the 1900s. Initially represented by the Bohemia national ice hockey team from 1909 to 1914, the team became part of the Czechoslovakia team after the First World War. The team won its first World Championship in 1947.

The team developed a rivalry with the Soviets in the 1960s. Czechoslovakia split into the Czech Republic and Slovakia in January 1993, and the IIHF recognized the Czech Republic's team as the successor to Czechoslovakia. From 1996 to 2001, the Czech Republic won six consecutive World Championship medals, including World Championship gold from 1999 to 2001, as well as gold at the 1998 Winter Olympics.

== History ==
=== Early years ===
Ice hockey was introduced in the erstwhile Kingdom of Bohemia in the Austro-Hungarian Empire in the 1900s, and became one of the popular sports in the Czech Republic. The earlier ice hockey clubs were founded in 1909. The Czechs were part of the Bohemia national ice hockey team from 1909 to 1914, and played the first international game in 1909 against France in Chamonix, France. The team won its first European title in the second European championship in 1911.

=== As Czechoslovakia ===
The Czechoslovakia team was established in 1920 prior to the 1920 Summer Olympics, which is considered by IIHF as the inaugural World Championship. In its first ever match, the team lost to Canada. The team recovered to win the bronze medal in the event after beating Sweden in the medal match. In the first European Championships held after the First World War in 1921, only two teams participated, and the Czechs lost to Sweden. In 1931, radio broadcast of ice hockey matches started in the country from then newly built Stvanice stadium. The country hosted its first ever World Championship in 1933.

=== World championship win ===
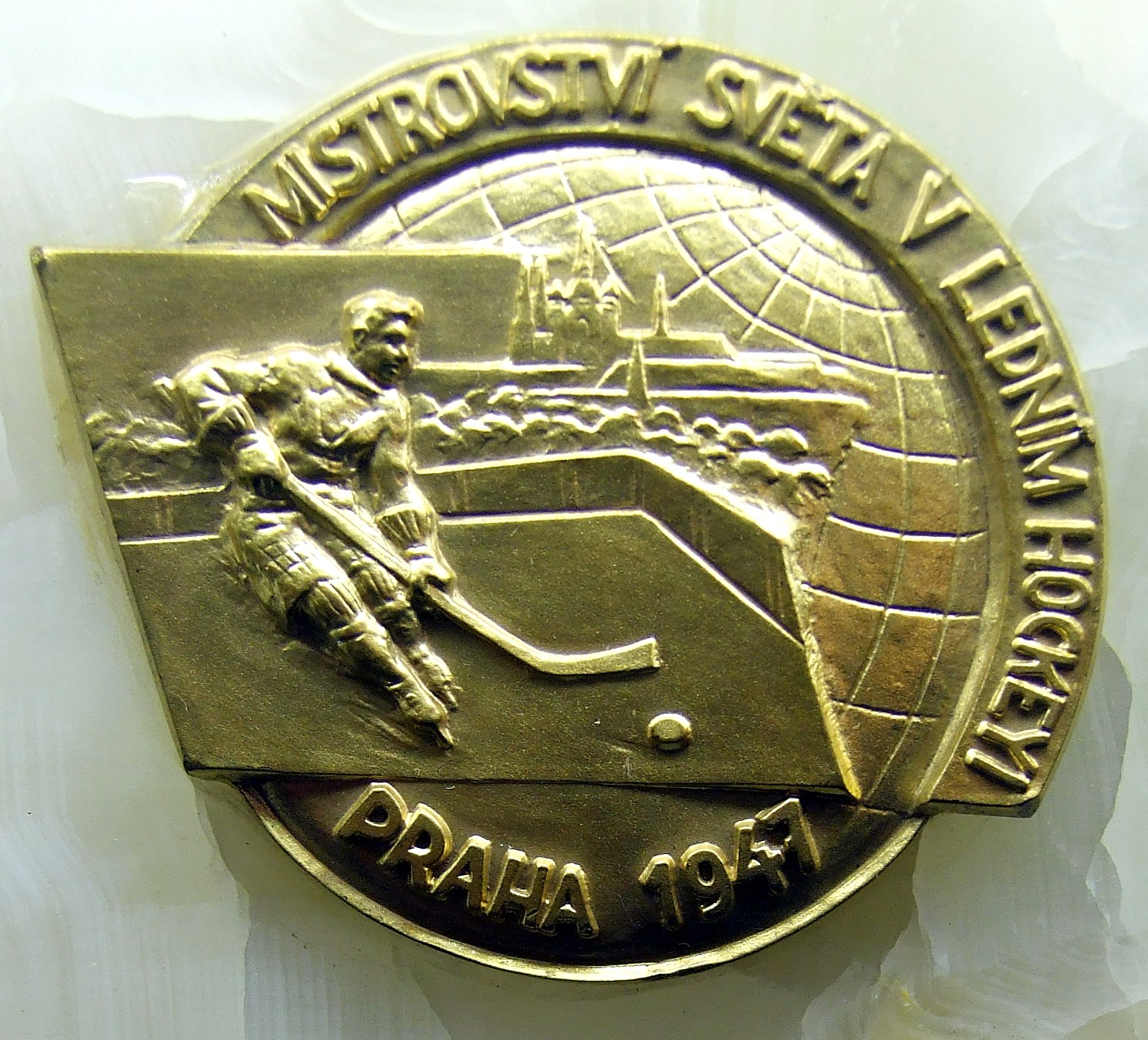
Gold medal won at the 1947 Ice Hockey World Championships

After the Second World War, the Czech team improved its performances. In the 1947 Ice Hockey World Championships held at Prague, the team won its first World Championship in the absence of Canada. The team won the silver medal in the ensuing 1948 Winter Olympics. In the 1949 Ice Hockey World Championships, the Czechs defeated Canada for the first time to win the title. However, in 1949, six players of the team were killed in a plane crash en route to London. While the Cold War developed in the 1950s, the team was caught in the middle of it. In 1950, the team that was meant to go to London to take part in World Championship was detained at the airport. Later, most of the team members were arrested and sentenced to long prison terms on charges of plotting against the state, and trying to escape to the Western world. While the team was finally released in January 1955 after years of hard labour in uranium mines, they were not allowed back into the team.

=== Rivalry with Soviets ===
In the 1950s, the Soviet team trained in ice hockey with the Czechs. The Soviets started improving their game, and the rivalry between the teams developed. In the 1964 Winter Olympics in Innsbruck, Czechoslovakia ended in a three-way tie for second place with Sweden and Canada, and won the bronze based on a tie-breaker. The Soviets dominated the remainder of the decade until the streak was broken by Czechoslovakia at the 1968 Winter Olympics. It was the last time that the Olympics were also counted as the World Championships. In 1969, the Soviet Union and Czechoslovakia played "the most emotionally charged games in the history of international hockey." The rights to host the tournament had originally been awarded to Czechoslovakia but was later moved to Sweden. The Czechoslovak team was determined to defeat the Soviets, and won both of their games 2–0 and 4–3. However, despite these wins, the team lost both of their games to Sweden and won bronze. The team also won three silver and a bronze in the Winter Olympics from 1968 and 1984.

=== Czech Republic and as a major power ===
Czechoslovakia split into the Czech Republic and Slovakia in January 1993, and the IIHF recognized the Czech Republic's team as the successor to Czechoslovakia. Following this, the next decade was dominated by the so-called "Big Six" –Canada, the Czech Republic, Finland, Russia, Sweden and the United States. At the 1993 World Championships, Czech Republic won its first medal (bronze). From 1996 to 2001, the Czech Republic won six consecutive World Championship medals, including World Championship gold from 1999 to 2001, as well as gold at the 1998 Winter Olympics. Since then, the team has won a lone bronze medal at the 2006 Winter Olympics.

The 2005 World Championships was again won by the Czech Republic. Sweden defeated the Czech Republic and won the 2006 World Championships. In the 2010, Czech Republic were crowned World champions after beating Russia but lost a game to Norway for the first time. In the 2011 and 2012 World Championships, Czech Republic won the bronze medal.

== Governance ==
The Czech Ice Hockey Association is the governing body of ice hockey in the country. Established in 1908, it is a member of the International Ice Hockey Federation (IIHF). The association conducts the Czech Extraliga, first held in the 1993-94 season. It replaced Czechoslovak First Ice Hockey League which was held from 1936 till 1993.
