= Gustaf Johansson (ice hockey) =

Swedish ice hockey and bandy player (1900–1971)

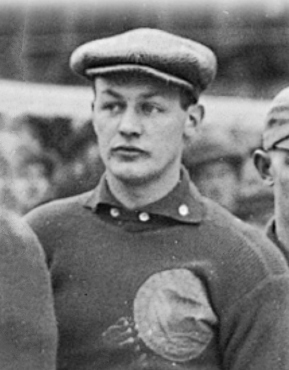

Personal information
- Born: 14 September 1900 Stockholm, Sweden
- Died: 1 July 1971 (aged 70) Stockholm, Sweden

Sport
- Sport: Ice hockey
- Club: IK Göta, Bromma
Medal record
Representing Sweden
Olympic Games
Silver medal – second place	1928 St. Moritz	Team
European Championships
Gold medal – first place	1923 Antwerpen	Team
Gold medal – first place	1928 St. Moritz	Team
Gold medal – first place	1932 Berlin	Team

Gustaf Julius Mauritz "Lulle" Johansson (14 September 1900 – 1 July 1971) was a Swedish ice hockey and bandy player. He competed in the 1924 and 1928 Winter Olympics and finished in fourth and second place, respectively. Between 1923 and 1935 he capped 64 international matches as a defenseman and scored 46 goals. He was a European Champion in 1923 and 1932.

Johansson played ice hockey and bandy with IK Göta, first as a forward and then as a defenseman. He won two national bandy titles (1925, 1929) and four ice hockey titles (1924, 1928–30), becoming the best scorer in 1929. Between 1922 and 1928 he studied in Berlin and played for Berliner SC, winning German titles in 1924 and 1928 and the 1928 Spengler Cup.

After retiring from competitions, in 1936–1965 Johansson worked as a sports journalist with Svenska Dagbladet. He was a board member of Swedish Ice Hockey Association in 1932–1934 and 1946–1947 and coached IK Göta in 1942–1944 and Djurgårdens IF in 1948–1949. His son Gösta, nicknamed Lill-Lulle (Little Lulle), also became an Olympic ice hockey player.
