= Josef Šroubek =

Czech ice hockey player

- Born: 2 December 1891 Prague, Austria-Hungary
- Died: 29 August 1964 (aged 72) Prague, Czechoslovakia
- Position: Left wing
- Shot: Right
- Played for: CSS Praha; HC Slavia Praha
- National team: Bohemia and Czechoslovakia
- Playing career: 1910–1933
Medal record
Olympic Games
Bronze medal – third place	1920 Antwerp	Team

Josef "Boban" Šroubek (2 December 1891 – 29 August 1964) was a Czech ice hockey player who competed for Czechoslovakia in the 1920 Summer Olympics, in the 1924 Winter Olympics, and in the 1928 Winter Olympics. He also played football as a forward for Sparta Prague, and made one appearance for the Czechoslovakia national team in 1921.

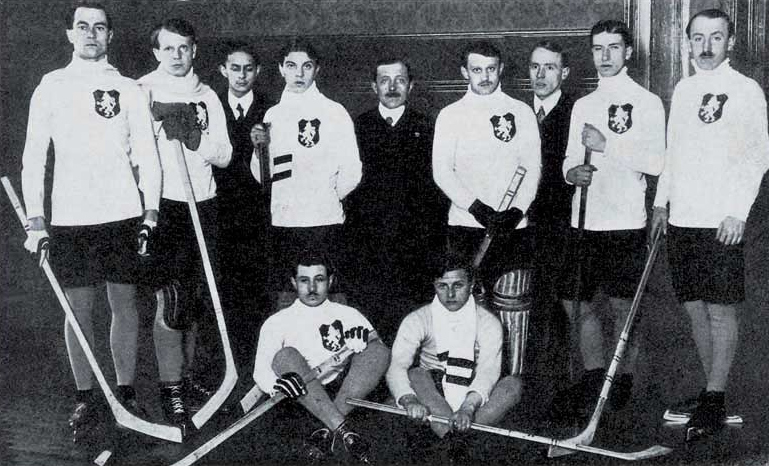
The Bohemian national team at the 1911 European Championship. Šroubek is in the back row, fourth from left.

He was a member of the Czechoslovak ice hockey team which won the bronze medal in 1920. He scored the lone goal against Sweden in the bronze medal game. He also participated in the 1924 ice hockey tournament and in the 1928 ice hockey tournament. He died in Prague, Czechoslovakia.
