= Otakar Vindyš =

Czech ice hockey player

- Born: 9 April 1889 Prague, Bohemia, Austria-Hungary
- Died: 23 December 1949 (aged 60) Prague, Czechoslovakia
- Position: Right wing
- Played for: HC Slavia Praha
- National team: Bohemia and Czechoslovakia
- Playing career: 1907–1927
Medal record
Olympic Games
Bronze medal – third place	1920 Antwerp	Team

Otakar Vindyš (9 April 1889 – 23 December 1949) was a Czech ice hockey defenseman who competed for Czechoslovakia in the 1920 Summer Olympics and in the 1924 Winter Olympics. Vindyš was a native of Prague.

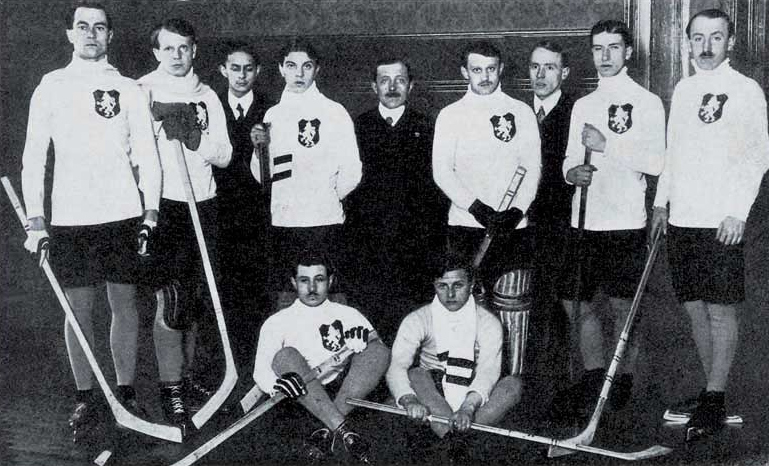
The Bohemian national team at the 1911 European Championship. Vindyš is standing second from left.

== Career ==
In 1911, Vindyš won the European Championship with Bohemia.

He was a member of the Czechoslovak national team which won the bronze medal at the 1920 Summer Olympics. Four years later he also participated in the first Winter Olympic ice hockey tournament.
