= Alfred de Rauch =

French ice hockey player

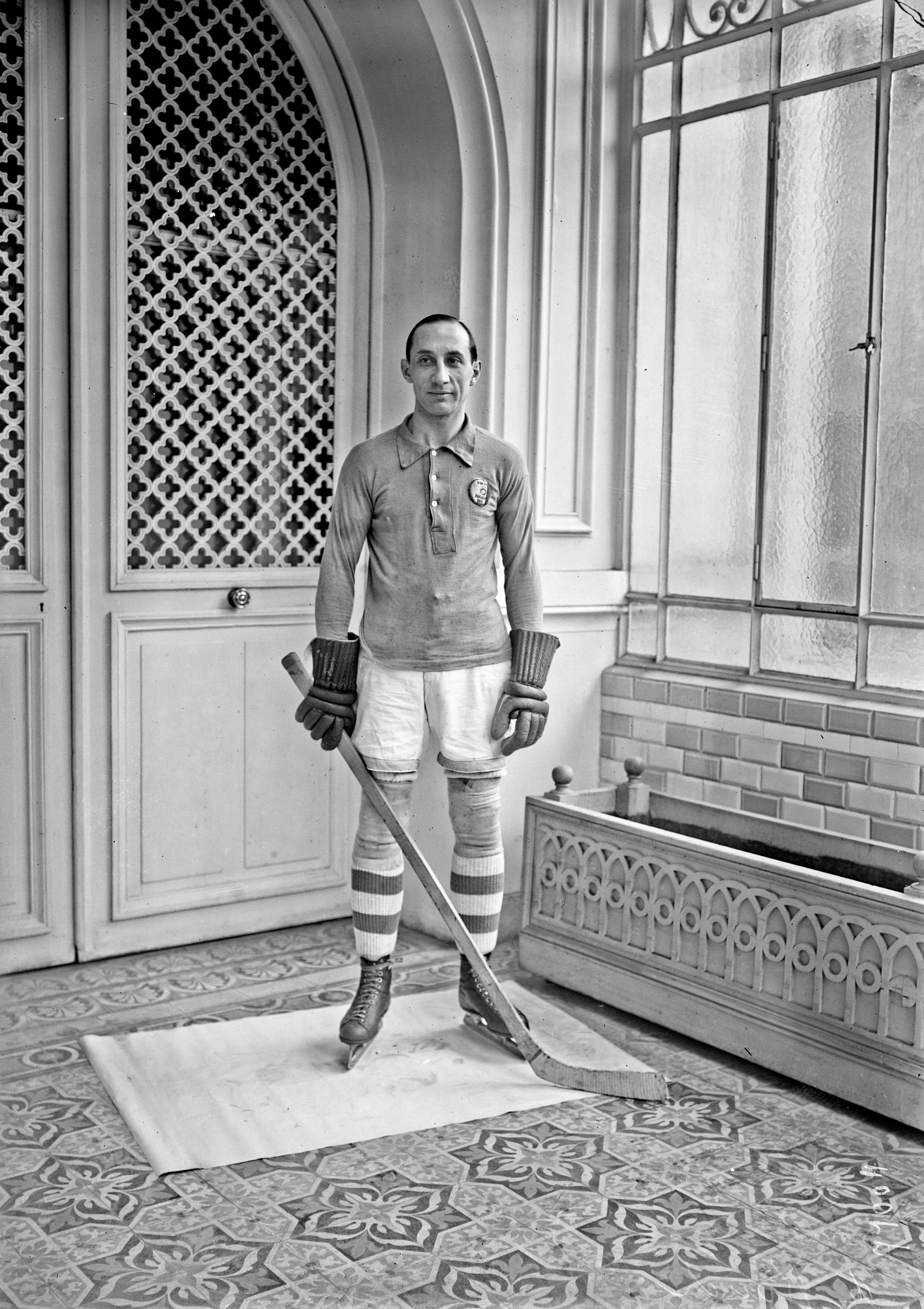
- Alfred de Rauch Portrait Agence Rol.
- Born: 1 June 1887; St. Petersburg, Russian Empire
- Died: 20 July 1948 (aged 61)
- Position: Left wing
- Shot: Left
- National team: France
- Playing career: 1908–1932

Alfred Antoine de Rauch (1 June 1887 – 20 July 1948) was a French ice hockey player.

== Career ==
De Rauch was born in Warsaw and played for the France men's national ice hockey team at the 1920 Summer Olympics in Antwerp, the 1924 Winter Olympics in Chamonix, and the 1928 Winter Olympics in St. Moritz. He won a silver medal with his team at the 1923 European Championship. At the 1924 European Championship, he won a gold medal with France.

At the club level, he won the French Championship with Club des Patineurs de Paris in 1911-12 and 1921-22.

== Achievements ==
- 1912 French champion with Club des Patineurs de Paris
- 1922 French champion with Club des Patineurs de Paris
- 1923 Silver medal at the European Championship
- 1924 Gold medal at the European Championship
