= Belgium men's national ice hockey team =

Belgium
- Association: Royal Belgian Ice Hockey Federation
- General manager: Gub Van Grinsven
- Head coach: Jeffrey Van Iersel
- Assistants: Chris Eimers
- Captain: Vadim Gyesbreghs
- Most games: Tim Vos (98)
- Top scorer: Vincent Morgan (36)
- Most points: Mitch Morgan; Vincent Morgan (78)
- Team colors
- IIHF code: BEL

Ranking
- Current IIHF: 40 (▲1) (3 June 2026)
- Highest IIHF: 32 (2005, 2016–17)
- Lowest IIHF: 40 (2022–23)

First international
- France 1–0 Belgium (Chamonix, France; 23 January 1909)

Biggest win
- Belgium 21–2 New Zealand (Geel, Belgium; 21 March 1989)

Biggest defeat
- Ukraine 37–2 Belgium (Bled, Slovenia; 13 March 1993)

Olympics
- Appearances: 4 (first in 1920)

IIHF World Championships
- Appearances: 55 (first in 1930)
- Best result: 7th (1950)

European Championships
- Appearances: 14 (first in 1910)
- Best result: (1913)

International record (W–L–T)
- 153–301–18

The Belgium men's national ice hockey team is the national men's ice hockey team of Belgium, and has been a member of the International Ice Hockey Federation (IIHF) since 1908. They have played in four Olympic Games, the last in 1936. The team also participated in the European Championships from 1910 to 1932. They have won 2 bronze medals (1910, 1911), 1 silver medal (1927), and 1 gold medal (1913).

== Tournament participation ==
=== Olympic Games ===
Games	GP	W	OW	T	OL	L	GF	GA	Coach	Captain	Finish	Rank
(Belgium) 1920 Antwerp	1	0	0	0	0	1	0	8	?	?	Gold Medal Round	5th (tied)
(France) 1924 Chamonix	3	0	0	0	0	3	8	45	?	?	First round	7th
(Switzerland) 1928 St. Moritz	3	2	0	0	0	1	9	10	?	?	First round	8th
(United States) 1932 Lake Placid	did not participate											
(Nazi Germany) 1936 Garmisch-Partenkirchen	3	0	0	0	0	3	4	20	?	?	First round	14th
1948–2026	did not qualify											

=== World Championships ===
- 1930 – Finished in 10th place
- 1933 – Finished in 12th place
- 1934 – Finished in 11th place
- 1935 – Finished in 14th place
- 1939 – Finished in 12th place
- 1947 – Finished in 8th place
- 1949 – Finished in 9th place
- 1950 – Finished in 7th place
- 1951 – Finished in 4th place Criterium Européen
- 1952 – Finished 5th place in Pool B
- 1955 – Finished in 6th place in Pool B
- 1956 – Finished in 3rd place in Pool B
- 1961 – Finished in 6th place in Pool C
- 1963 – Finished in 6th place in Pool C
- 1970 – Finished in 7th place in Pool C
- 1971 – Finished in 8th place in Pool C
- 1975 – Finished in 7th place in Pool C
- 1977 – Finished in 6th place in Pool C
- 1978 – Finished in 8th place in Pool C
- 1987 – Finished in 8th place in Pool C
- 1989 – Finished in 1st place in Pool D
- 1990 – Finished in 8th place in Pool C
- 1991 – Finished in 9th place in Pool C
- 1992 – Finished in 5th place in Pool C1
- 1993 – Finished in 8th place in Pool C
- 1994 – Finished in 5th place in Pool C2
- 1995 – Finished in 5th place in Pool C2
- 1996 – Finished in 4th place in Pool D
- 1997 – Finished in 8th place in Pool D
- 1998 – Finished in 4th place in Pool D
- 1999 – Finished in 4th place in Pool D
- 2000 – Finished in 2nd place in Pool D
- 2001 – Finished in 5th place in Division II, Group B
- 2002 – Finished in 2nd place in Division II, Group A
- 2003 – Finished in 1st place in Division II, Group B
- 2004 – Finished in 6th place in Division I, Group A
- 2005 – Finished in 4th place in Division II, Group B
- 2006 – Finished in 3rd place in Division II, Group A
- 2007 – Finished in 2nd place in Division II, Group A
- 2008 – Finished in 2nd place in Division II, Group A
- 2009 – Finished in 2nd place in Division II, Group B
- 2010 – Finished in 3rd place in Division II, Group A
- 2011 – Finished in 4th place in Division II, Group A
- 2012 – Finished in 1st place in Division II, Group B
- 2013 – Finished in 2nd place in Division II, Group A
- 2014 – Finished in 5th place in Division II, Group A
- 2015 – Finished in 2nd place in Division II, Group A
- 2016 – Finished in 3rd place in Division II, Group A
- 2017 – Finished in 4th place in Division II, Group A
- 2018 – Finished in 5th place in Division II, Group A
- 2019 – Finished in 6th place in Division II, Group A
- 2020 – Cancelled due to the COVID-19 pandemic
- 2021 – Cancelled due to the COVID-19 pandemic
- 2022 – Finished in 3rd place in Division II, Group B
- 2023 – Finished in 2nd place in Division II, Group B
- 2024 – Finished in 1st place in Division II, Group B
- 2025 – Finished in 4th place in Division II, Group A
- 2026 – Division II, Group A

=== European Championships ===
Games	GP	W	T	L	GF	GA	Coach	Captain	Finish	Rank
(Switzerland) 1910 Les Avants	3	1	1	1	5	6	?	?	Round-robin	3rd place, bronze medalist(s)
(German Empire) 1911 Berlin	3	1	1	1	5	13	?	?	Round-robin	3rd place, bronze medalist(s)
(Austria-Hungary) 1912 Prague*	did not participate									
(German Empire) 1913 Munich	3	2	1	0	25	10	?	?	Round-robin	1st place, gold medalist(s)
(German Empire) 1914 Berlin	2	0	0	2	2	13	?	?	Round-robin	3rd place, bronze medalist(s)
1915–1920	No Championships (World War I).									
(Sweden) 1921 Stockholm	did not participate									
(Switzerland) 1922 St. Moritz	did not participate									
(Belgium) 1923 Antwerp	4	1	0	3	5	18	?	?	Round-robin	4th
(Italy) 1924 Milan	2	1	0	1	4	3	?	?	Group stage	4th
(Czechoslovakia) 1925 Štrbské Pleso, Starý Smokovec	3	0	1	2	1	9	?	?	Round-robin	4th
(Switzerland) 1926 Davos	4	1	0	3	5	8	?	?	Second round	7th
(Austria) 1927 Wien	5	3	1	1	13	3	?	?	Round-robin	2nd place, silver medalist(s)
(Hungary) 1929 Budapest	2	0	1	1	1	2	?	?	First round	7th
(Germany) 1932 Berlin	did not participate									

== All-time record ==
As of 19 April 2025.

Opponent	Played	Won	Drawn	Lost	GF	GA	GD
Australia	16	8	0	8	64	59	+5
Austria	13	1	0	12	36	106	-70
Belarus	1	0	0	1	0	10	-10
Bohemia	4	1	1	2	9	17	-8
Bulgaria	21	9	1	11	95	123	-28
Canada	1	0	0	1	0	33	-33
China	8	3	0	5	29	52	-23
Chinese Taipei	1	1	0	0	8	1	+7
Croatia	7	2	0	5	13	42	-29
Czechoslovakia	8	1	0	7	7	76	−69
Denmark	13	1	0	12	31	177	-146
East Germany	2	0	0	2	8	30	-22
England	6	1	1	4	12	50	-38
Estonia	3	0	0	3	4	22	−18
Finland	1	0	0	1	2	17	−15
France	53	14	2	37	115	303	-188
Georgia	2	1	0	1	7	6	+1
Germany	14	4	1	9	32	69	-37
Great Britain	23	3	1	19	54	188	-134
Greece	2	1	0	1	19	7	+12
Hungary	16	2	1	13	36	162	-126
Iceland	10	7	0	3	57	28	+29
Ireland	1	1	0	0	9	1	+8
Israel	15	8	1	6	60	47	+13
Italy	8	1	0	7	15	74	-59
Japan	1	0	0	1	0	24	-24
Latvia	2	0	0	2	4	31	-27
Lithuania	2	0	0	2	4	19	-15
Luxembourg	4	4	0	0	36	4	+32
Mexico	7	7	0	0	55	8	+47
Netherlands	72	18	3	51	211	457	-246
New Zealand	4	3	0	1	37	8	+29
North Korea	8	2	0	6	14	36	-22
Norway	5	0	0	5	7	58	-51
Poland	5	0	1	4	6	29	-23
Romania	15	0	0	15	24	133	-109
Scotland	1	0	0	1	0	8	-8
Serbia	16	6	1	5	38	45	-8
Serbia and Montenegro	2	1	1	0	7	4	+3
South Africa	10	9	0	1	88	17	+71
South Korea	7	3	0	4	24	27	-3
Spain	18	11	0	7	69	73	-4
Sweden	6	0	0	6	7	57	−50
Switzerland	16	8	1	7	59	116	-57
Turkey	4	4	0	0	43	5	+38
Ukraine	1	0	0	1	2	37	-35
United Arab Emirates	1	0	0	1	3	4	-1
United States	3	0	0	3	2	44	−42
Yugoslavia	6	1	1	4	22	66	-44
Total	461	147	18	296	1 484	3 010	-1 526

== Hockey Hall of Fame members ==
- Paul Loicq, team captain, player-coach, president of the International Ice Hockey Federation
