= Czech Ice Hockey Association =

Ice hockey governing body of Czechia

Czech Republic
- Association name: Czech Ice Hockey Association
- IIHF Code: CZE
- IIHF membership: 15 November 1908
- Association history: Bohemia 1908–1920; Czechoslovakia 1920–1992; Czech Republic 1993–present
- President: Alois Hadamczik
- IIHF men's ranking: 5 (▼2) (26 May 2025)
- IIHF women's ranking: 4 (21 April 2025)

The Czech Ice Hockey Association (Czech: Český svaz ledního hokeje, ČSLH), also known by the shortened name Czech Ice Hockey (Czech: Český hokej), is the governing body of ice hockey and sledge hockey in Czechia. It is a member of the International Ice Hockey Federation (IIHF) and controls the majority of organized ice hockey in the Czech Republic.

== Structure ==
The highest body of the Czech Ice Hockey Association is the conference, which convenes once every two years and is elected once every four years.

Between conferences, the ČSLH is managed by an eleven-member executive committee headed by the president of the association. As of 2023, Alois Hadamczik is president of the association and the vice presidents are Petr Bříza and Aleš Pavlík, who is also president of the Association of Professional Ice Hockey Clubs (Czech: Asociace profesionálních klubů ledního hokeje; APK LH). The remaining executive committee members are:

- Marek Chmiel
- Jaromír Jágr
- Aleš Kmoníček
- Milan Vacke
- Daniel Sadil
- Bedřich Ščerban
- Jiří Šindler
- Jiří Šlégr

The Supervisory Board is a permanent body that also functions between the conferences. The seven-person board is chaired by Miloslav Šeba.

ČSLH membership is open to both clubs and individuals.

The Czech Ice Hockey Association currently has nearly 35,000 players registered with the IIHF, of which around 8,700 are in the men's category, almost 1,900 are in the women's category, and over 23,000 are in the junior category. There are 183 indoor rinks and thirteen outdoor rinks in the country.

=== Committees ===
Within the ČSLH there are eighteen specialized committees or commissions:

Committee	Chairperson	Members
Arbitration	JUDr. Vladimír Balaš	7
Business and marketing	Milan Vacke	5
Czech Ice Hockey Hall of Fame nomination	Bedřich Ščerban	12
Coaching and methodology	Zdeněk Vojta	5
Conciliation	Martin Loukota	3
Disciplinary	Pavel Setikovský	7
Extraliga disciplinary	Viktor Ujčík	
Goalkeeping	Petr Přikryl	6
Ivan Hlinka Foundation Fund	Liběna Hlinková	
Medical	Miroslav Budoš	7
Players'	Jiří Šlégr	
Referees'	Vladimír Šindler	7
Representative (Sports)	Alois Hadamczik	20
Sledge hockey	Jiří Šindler	6
Sports-technical	Antonín Vansa	6
Veterans'	Jiří Šlégr	5
Women's ice hockey	Tereza Sadilová	6
Youth ice hockey	Daniel Sadil	

ČSLH is also the founder of PRO-HOCKEY Cz, a subsidiary company that manages marketing and television rights related to Czech national ice hockey teams (including junior).

=== National leagues ===
From hockey competitions ČSLH organizes at central level I and II. Men's league, women's league and extraliga (leagues) for pupils, teenagers and juniors. On the regional level, regional assemblies of regional agendas (such as the Regional Hockey League) are organized by the regional unions.

== National team logos over time ==
Coat of arms of Bohemia (1909–1914)	Lesser coat of arms of Czechoslovakia (1920–1939) and (1945–1960).	Coat of arms of Czechoslovak Socialist Republic (1968–1989).	Flag of Czechoslovakia (1990–1993)	Coat of arms of the Czech Republic (1994–2018).	The new logo adopted in August 2018 (2018–).

== History ==
=== Origin and time before the First World War ===
The Czech Hockey Union was formed on the initiative of Slavia Praha functionary Emil Procházka, who sent the application to the just-emerging LIHG on November 15, 1908, although the constituent general assembly of the Czech Hockey League took place on December 11. The General Meetings were attended by delegates from twelve sports clubs. However, there were immediately disputes between representatives of Slavia Praha and Sparta Praha, and the General Meeting had to repeat it three times. The first chairman of the Union became Jaroslav Potůček from BZK Prague for more than a few days until January 13, 1909. The union subsequently decided to send a representative team, whose players were later named hockey musketeers, to an international tournament in Chamonix, France.

The union did not use money and the spread of ice hockey (called to differentiate itself from the Canadian hockey band) helped at least by the fact that its officials published articles in various magazines. Particularly active was the representative of the Czech Union in the LIHG and the goalkeeper of the ice hockey musketeers Josef Gruss and interesting ideas were presented in the press also the shooter of the first Czech goalkeeping goal, Jan Palouš. After the success of the 1911 European Ice Hockey Championship, the association managed to win the next championship. This was later canceled because the Austrian Hockey League was not a member of the LIHG at the time of its conduct, and the indiscriminate match of the Czech hockey players with the Germans did not repeat despite the protests of the rival. The then president of the Czech Union Procházka resigned in response to this decision.

Before the First World War, the Czech Union alternated about two dozen clubs, but they had to organize the tournaments themselves. The association has been more focused on safeguarding positions on the international scene. Unlike football, the Hockey League has succeeded in defending membership of the LIHG on the national principle instead of the state throughout this critical period.

=== Between the two world wars ===
After the establishment of Czechoslovakia, the Czechoslovak Hockey Association (CSSH) was established in 1919 as an organization under which, in addition to ice hockey, the bands and ground hockey also fell. Ice hockey was run by about a third of 25 member clubs. Following the success of the ice hockey team in the 1920 ice hockey tournament, the Ice Hockey Section, under the chairmanship of the successful representative of Jan Fleischmann in 1921, was named the Czechoslovak Canadian Hockey Association (CSSKH).

In the last month of 1923, the union split, when the Czechoslovak Association of Canadian Hockey (ČSAKH) separated from it under the leadership of Karel Hartmann of Sparta. The calm of the situation did not contribute to the fact that in January of the following year a union championship was held, which was the first time to fight for the trophy cup donated by the president T. Masaryk. The disputes also affected the nomination for the ice hockey tournament of the 1924 Winter Olympics, despite the fact that the Czechoslovak Sporting Village tried to prevent it. Of the clubs that leaned toward the ČSAKH, only Maleček, who received a soldier of the attendance service, attended an order from the Ministry of Defense. The unification of the Union took place after a year, mainly under the influence of the European Ice Hockey Championship 1925.

Domestic championship decorated with gold medals has greatly helped the Union to promote ice hockey at the expense of the band in Slovakia, where it took place after some peripetials. In 1927, the union brought together twice the number of clubs to the state after the First World War, but this did not match the number of registered players. So registration was declared a necessary condition for each player to take part in a match. In the following year, ice and ground hockey structures were separated. At the same time, the problem of the parallel existence of the associations of national minorities on the territory of Czechoslovakia began to be solved. German clubs associated with Deutscher EisHockey Verband (DEHV) threatened international boycott from LIHG, but the situation has improved rapidly. In January 1929, for example, a match was played between the teams of Prague and Opava, where the best hockey players of German origin were in the Czechoslovak territory. At the 1929 European ice hockey championship, four Opava players went out with the Czechoslovak representation team, with another title largely deserving of key goals in two extensions in the decisive games Wolfgang Dorasil.

After a successful championship, the union also had the final promise of building a winter stadium with the first artificial ice in Czechoslovakia. The construction of the stadium in Štvanice in Prague has faced a number of problems. These, among other things, made it impossible for the European Ice Hockey Championship 1932 to be held in Prague. In the fall of 1931, the Czechoslovak League of Canadian Hockey (ČSLKH) was established, which merged clubs from the Czechoslovak and German associations. Jaromir Citta was the chairman of the then Czechoslovak club, LTC Praha, for the last five years. His work has also begun by the Corps of Judges, who associated the judges as other important participants in each hockey match. On November 6, 1932, the official and permanent opening of the winter stadium in Štvanice took place. A quarter of a year later, the Ice Hockey World Championship took place in 1933, when Czechoslovak hockey players won another title of European Champion.

While the number of hockey clubs distributed was around 15, the number of hockey clubs under ČSLKH and registered ice hockey players increased until 1938. At that time, Hungarian hockey clubs operating in the Czechoslovak territory were also involved in ČSLKH. Overall, ČSLKH held in 1938 with 361 member clubs a remarkable European primacy. This was due to the organization of the World Championships and the involvement of Canadian ice hockey players, especially by Prague clubs. Both of these facts could have led to the popularity of ice hockey popularity among the public. Among the Canadian players, Mike Buckna was instrumental to the development of ice hockey in Czechoslovakia and coached the national team to the bronze medal at the 1938 Ice Hockey World Championship, gold at the 1947 Ice Hockey World Championship, and silver in the ice hockey tournament at the 1948 Winter Olympics in St. Moritz.

The association has managed to establish and complete at least two years of the National Leagues as a new national ice hockey club competition under these favorable conditions. This was in the conditions when the only permanent artificial ice area in Czechoslovakia was a great success.

== Criticism ==
The Czech Ice Hockey League faces long-standing criticism of the conditions of national team players, which are compared to modern slavery. One of the biggest critics of the League is the Association of Professional Ice Hockey Clubs (APK LH). Meanwhile, the first known hockey player to contract out of so many criticized tabloids is Adam Jehlička.
