= 1913 European Championship =

1913 European Championship may refer to

- 1913 European Bandy Championships
- Ice Hockey European Championship 1913
