= Přikryl =

Přikryl (feminine: Přikrylová) is a Czech surname. It may refer to:

- Ondřej Přikryl, Czech poet
- Patrik Prikryl (born 1992), Slovak footballer
- Petr Přikryl, Czech ice hockey player
- Rudolf Prikryl, Austrian politician
- Tomáš Přikryl, Czech footballer
- Vlasta Přikrylová, Czech athlete
