= Roger Bader =

Swiss ice hockey player and coach

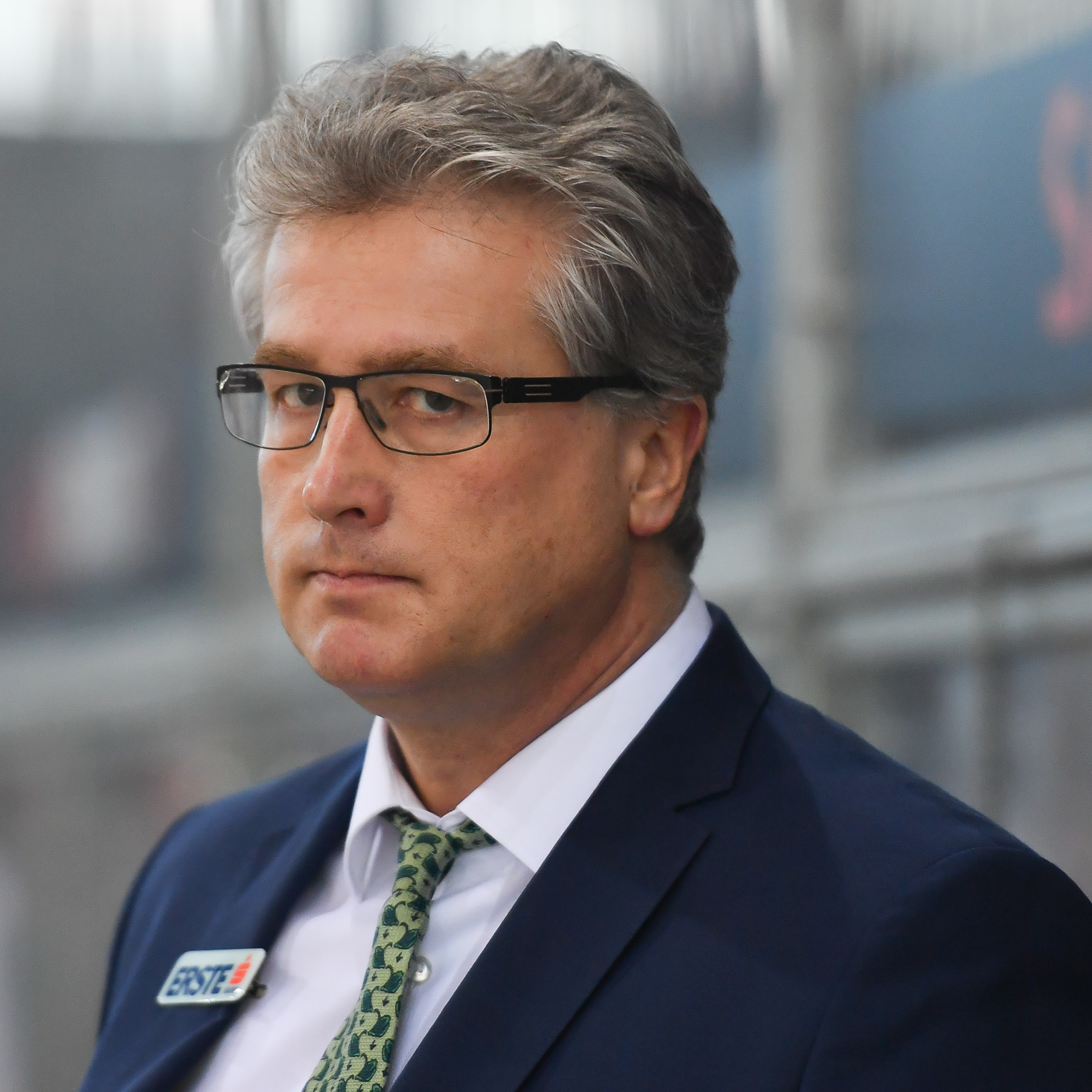
- Born: 29 September 1964 (age 60); Winterthur, Switzerland
- Position: Defence
- Played for: EHC Winterthur
- Playing career: 1985–1986

Roger Bader (born 29 September 1964) is a Swiss retired ice hockey player and coach, who coached the Austrian national team at the 2019 IIHF World Championship.
