= 1929 Ice Hockey European Championship =

1929 edition of the Ice Hockey European Championship

The 1929 Ice Hockey European Championship was the 14th edition of the ice hockey tournament for European countries associated to the International Ice Hockey Federation.

The tournament was played between January 28, and February 3, 1929, in Budapest, Hungary, and Czechoslovakia won their fifth title.

Three groups of three were to play with the second place team in each group going to the second round, and the first place team going directly to the semi-finals: the first place team in the second round would become the fourth semi-finalist.

Finland withdrew after the draw, leaving the first group with only two teams.

== First round ==
=== Group A ===
January 30

Team #1	Score	Team #2
Poland	2:0	Switzerland

==== Standings Group A ====
	GP	W	T	L	GF	GA	DIF	Pts
Poland	1	1	0	0	2	0	+2	2
Switzerland	1	0	0	1	0	2	-2	0

=== Group B ===
January 28

Team #1	Score	Team #2
Austria	1:0	Germany

January 29

Team #1	Score	Team #2
Czechoslovakia	2:1	Germany

January 30

Team #1	Score	Team #2
Czechoslovakia	3:1	Austria

==== Standings Group B ====
	GP	W	T	L	GF	GA	DIF	Pts
Czechoslovakia	2	2	0	0	5	2	+3	4
Austria	2	1	0	1	2	3	-1	2
Germany	2	0	0	2	1	3	-2	0

=== Group C ===
January 28

Team #1	Score	Team #2
Hungary	1:2	Italy

January 29

Team #1	Score	Team #2
Italy	1:0	Belgium

January 30

Team #1	Score	Team #2
Hungary	1:1	Belgium

==== Standings Group C ====
	GP	W	T	L	GF	GA	DIF	Pts
Italy	2	2	0	0	3	1	+2	4
Hungary	2	0	1	1	2	3	-1	1
Belgium	2	0	1	1	1	2	-1	1

== Second round ==
January 31

Team #1	Score	Team #2
Hungary	0:3	Austria

February 1

Team #1	Score	Team #2
Austria	3:1	Switzerland

February 1

Team #1	Score	Team #2
Hungary	0:1	Switzerland

=== Standings Second Round ===
	GP	W	T	L	GF	GA	DIF	Pts
Austria	2	2	0	0	6	1	+5	4
Switzerland	2	1	0	1	2	3	-1	2
Hungary	2	0	0	2	0	4	-4	0

== Semifinals ==
February 1

Team #1	Score	Team #2
Czechoslovakia	1:0	Italy

February 2

Team #1	Score	Team #2
Poland	3:1	Austria

== Third place match ==
February 3

Team #1	Score	Team #2
Austria	4:2	Italy

== Final ==
February 3

Team #1	Score	Team #2
Czechoslovakia	2:1	Poland

=== Top goalscorers ===
Ulrich Lederer (Austria), 6 goals

European Championship 1929 winner

Czechoslovakia
Third title
