= 1925 Ice Hockey European Championship =

The 1925 Ice Hockey European Championship was the 10th edition of the ice hockey tournament for European countries associated to the International Ice Hockey Federation.

The tournament was played between January 8, and January 11, 1925, in Štrbské Pleso and Starý Smokovec, Czechoslovakia (present-day Slovakia), and it was won by the host team.

== Results ==
January 8

Team #1	Score	Team #2
Switzerland	1:1	Belgium

January 9

Team #1	Score	Team #2
Czechoslovakia	3:0	Austria

January 11

Team #1	Score	Team #2
Czechoslovakia	1:0	Switzerland
Austria	2:0	Belgium
Austria	2:2	Switzerland
Czechoslovakia	6:0	Belgium

=== Final standings ===
	GP	W	T	L	GF	GA	DIF	Pts
Czechoslovakia	3	3	0	0	10	0	+10	6
Austria	3	1	1	1	4	5	-1	3
Switzerland	3	0	2	1	3	4	-1	2
Belgium	3	0	1	2	1	9	-8	1

=== Top Goalscorer ===
Josef Maleček (Czechoslovakia), 5 goals

European Championship 1925 winner

Czechoslovakia
Second title
