= Petr Přikryl =

Czech ice hockey player

- Born: February 17, 1978 (age 47); Litoměřice, Czechoslovakia
- Height: 5 ft 11 in (180 cm)
- Weight: 179 lb (81 kg; 12 st 11 lb)
- Position: Goaltender
- Catches: Right
- CZE team: HC Plzeň
- Playing career: 1997–present

Petr Přikryl (born February 17, 1978) is a Czech professional ice hockey goaltender. He played with HC Plzeň in the Czech Extraliga during the 2010–11 Czech Extraliga season.
