= Bohemia national ice hockey team =

Former national sports team

Bohemia
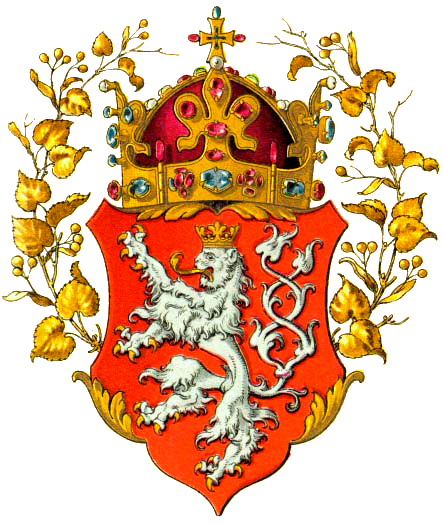
- The coat of arms of Bohemia was used on the players jerseys.
- Team colors
- IIHF code: BOH

First international
- France 8–1 Bohemia (Chamonix, France; 23 January 1909); Last international Germany 0–2 Bohemia (Berlin, German Empire; 27 February 1914)

Biggest win
- Bohemia 13–0 Switzerland (Berlin, German Empire; 15 February 1911)

Biggest defeat
- England 11–0 Bohemia (Chamonix, France; 24 January 1909)

European Championships
- Appearances: 4
- Best result: (gold) (1911, 1912,^{[I]} 1914)

International record (W–L–T)
- 8–5–2

Medal record

European Championships
Gold medal – first place	1911 German Empire	
Gold medal – first place	1912 Austria-Hungary	
Gold medal – first place	1914 German Empire	
Silver medal – second place	1913 German Empire	

The Bohemia national ice hockey team was the national ice hockey team of the Kingdom of Bohemia, a constituent kingdom of Austria-Hungary. The team competed from 1909 to 1914, participating in four European Championships. After playing its final game in 1914, the team was succeeded by the Czechoslovakia men's national ice hockey team following the dissolution of the Kingdom of Bohemia and the formation of the First Czechoslovak Republic.

== History ==
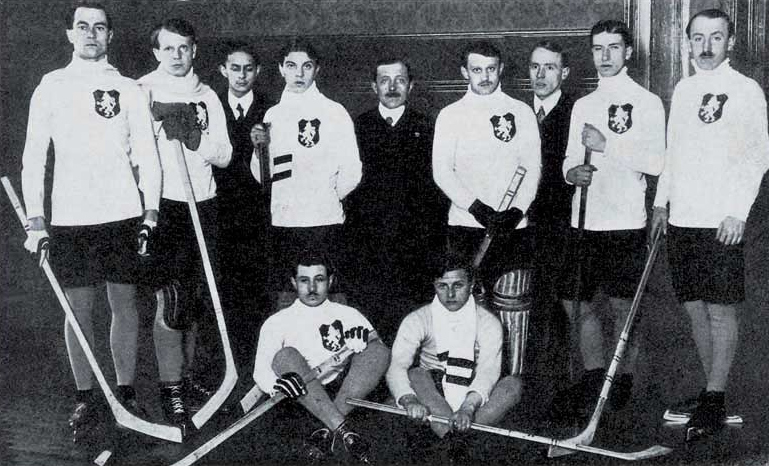
Bohemia at the 1911 European Championship, which they won.

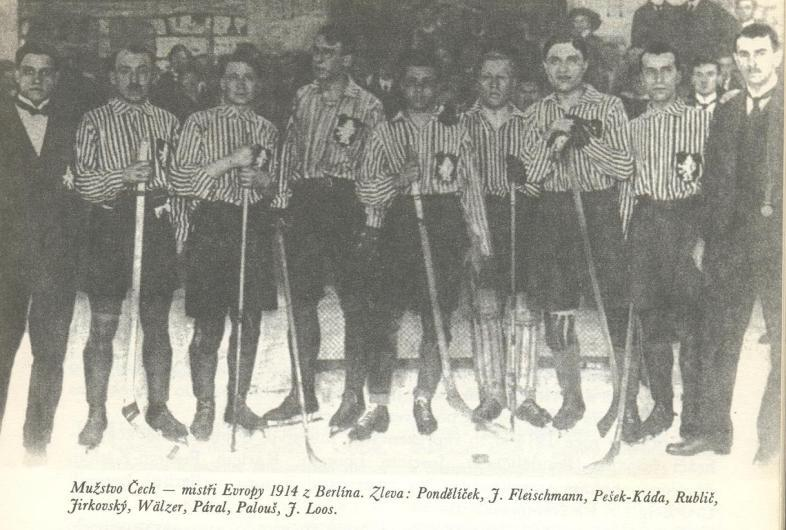
Bohemia at the 1914 European Championship, which they won.

Bohemia played its first game in 1909 against France during the Chamonix Cup which was being held in Chamonix, France. Bohemia lost the game 1–8 and lost all of their three other games at the tournament against Belgium, England and Switzerland. During the tournament the team's 0–11 loss against England would be recorded as the team's largest ever loss in international participation. The following year Bohemia announced their intention to participate in the inaugural European Championships being held in Les Avants, Switzerland however withdrew due to a lack of training. In 1911, Bohemia participated in the 1911 European Championship being held in Berlin, German Empire. Bohemia won the tournament after winning all three of their games and finishing on top of the standings. During the tournament, they also achieved their largest ever win in international participation when they beat Switzerland 13–0. The following year Bohemia, this time being represented by the club team HC Slavia Praha, again won gold at the European Championships however the tournament was annulled by the Ligue Internationale de Hockey sur Glace (LIHG) congress due to Austria not being affiliated with the LIHG at the time of the tournament. During the 1913 European Championship, Bohemia finished second behind Belgium who won their first title. In 1914, Bohemia competed in an exhibition game against Germany in Montreux, Switzerland. Germany won the game 4–2 and recorded their first and only win over Bohemia. A month later, Bohemia competed in their last European Championship. Being represented again by HC Slavia Praha, Bohemia went on to win their third Championship in four years after winning both of their games and finishing on top the standings.

After playing their last game in 1914, the Bohemian national team was succeeded by the Czechoslovakia men's national ice hockey team after the Kingdom of Bohemia was dissolved and became part of the First Czechoslovak Republic

== International competitions ==
- 1909 Chamonix Cup; Chamonix, France. Finish: 5th
- 1911 European Championship; Berlin, German Empire. Finish: Won gold medal
- 1912 European Championship; Prague, Austria-Hungary. Finish: Won gold medal^{[I]}
- 1913 European Championship; Munich, German Empire. Finish: Won silver medal
- 1914 European Championship; Berlin, German Empire. Finish: Won gold medal

== European Championship record ==
Games	GP	W	T	L	GF	GA	Coach	Captain	Finish	Rank
(Switzerland) 1910 Les Avants	Withdrew due to lack of training									
(German Empire) 1911 Berlin	3	3	0	0	20	1	?	?	Round-robin	1st place, gold medalist(s)
(Austria-Hungary) 1912 Prague*	2	1	1	0	7	2	?	?	Round-robin	1st place, gold medalist(s)
(German Empire) 1913 Munich	3	2	1	0	15	6	?	?	Round-robin	2nd place, silver medalist(s)
(German Empire) 1914 Berlin	2	2	0	0	11	1	?	?	Round-robin	1st place, gold medalist(s)
1915–1920	No Championships (World War I).									
1921–1932	Continuity as Czechoslovakia.									

- 1912 Championship was later annulled because Austria was not a member of the IIHF at the time of the competition.

== All-time Record against other nations ==
Team	GP	W	T	L	GF	GA
(Austrian Empire) Austria	2	2	0	0	12	0
Belgium	4	2	1	1	17	10
England	1	0	0	1	0	11
France	1	0	0	1	1	8
(German Empire) Germany	5	3	1	1	14	9
Switzerland	2	1	0	1	15	8

== Notes ==
Result was annulled due to Austria not being a member of the Ligue Internationale de Hockey sur Glace at the time.
