= 1926 Ice Hockey European Championship =

The 1926 Ice Hockey European Championship was the 11th edition of the ice hockey tournament for European countries associated to the International Ice Hockey Federation.

The tournament was played between January 11, and January 19, 1926, in Davos, Switzerland, and it was won by Switzerland.

Nine teams entered the competition and were divided into three groups of three for the preliminary round. The preliminary round was scheduled over the first three days, the “qualification for the final round” was contested in one day, and the “final” round was scheduled over the last three days. The tournament was however extended by an additional two days to accommodate a three-way tie-break round, which became necessary due to the three-way tie on points for the gold medal.

== Preliminary round ==
Group winners advanced directly to the Final Round.

Second-place teams advanced to the Qualification for Final Round.

Third-place teams advanced to the consolation round.

=== Group A ===
January 11

Team #1	Score	Team #2
Belgium	5:0	Spain

January 12

Team #1	Score	Team #2
Czechoslovakia	2:0	Belgium

January 13

Team #1	Score	Team #2
Czechoslovakia	9:2	Spain

==== Standings Group A ====
	GP	W	T	L	GF	GA	Ratio	Pts
Czechoslovakia	2	2	0	0	11	2	5.50	4
Belgium	2	1	0	1	5	2	2.50	2
Spain	2	0	0	2	2	14	0.14	0

=== Group B ===
The game between Austria and France was delayed by one day due to the late arrival of the French team.

January 12

Team #1	Score	Team #2
Austria	2:1	France
France	2:1	Poland

January 13

Team #1	Score	Team #2
Austria	2:1	Poland

==== Standings Group B ====
	GP	W	T	L	GF	GA	Ratio	Pts
Austria	2	2	0	0	4	2	2.00	4
France	2	1	0	1	3	3	1.00	2
Poland	2	0	0	2	2	4	0.50	0

=== Group C ===
January 11

Team #1	Score	Team #2
Great Britain	8:1	Italy

January 12

Team #1	Score	Team #2
Switzerland	13:0	Italy

January 13

Team #1	Score	Team #2
Switzerland	5:4	Great Britain

==== Standings Group C ====
	GP	W	T	L	GF	GA	Ratio	Pts
Switzerland	2	2	0	0	18	4	4.50	4
Great Britain	2	1	0	1	12	6	2.00	2
Italy	2	0	0	2	1	21	0.05	0

== Qualification for Final Round ==
Winner advanced to Final Round.

Third-place team advanced to Game for 6th-7th places.

January 14

Team #1	Score	Team #2
Great Britain	5:0	Belgium

January 14

Team #1	Score	Team #2
Great Britain	3:1	France

January 14

Team #1	Score	Team #2
France	1:0	Belgium

=== Standings Qualification for Final Round ===
	GP	W	T	L	GF	GA	Ratio	Pts
Great Britain	2	2	0	0	8	1	8.00	4
France	2	1	0	1	2	3	0.67	2
Belgium	2	0	0	2	0	6	0.00	0

== Consolation round ==
Winner advanced to Game for 6th-7th places.

January 14

Team #1	Score	Team #2
Spain	2:2	Italy

January 15

Team #1	Score	Team #2
Poland	3:1	Italy

January 16

Team #1	Score	Team #2
Poland	4:1	Spain

=== Standings Consolation round ===
	GP	W	T	L	GF	GA	Ratio	Pts
Poland	2	2	0	0	7	2	3.50	4
Italy	2	0	1	1	3	5	0.60	1
Spain	2	0	1	1	3	6	0.50	1

== Final Round ==
Although goal ratio was first tie-break criterion, a special three-team tie-break round was held instead, because the tie was for the gold medal.

January 15

Team #1	Score	Team #2
Czechoslovakia	2:1	Great Britain
Switzerland	5:3	Austria

January 16

Team #1	Score	Team #2
Austria	3:1	Great Britain
Switzerland	0:1	Czechoslovakia

January 17

Team #1	Score	Team #2
Austria	1:0	Czechoslovakia
Switzerland	7:4	Great Britain

=== Standings Final Round ===
	GP	W	T	L	GF	GA	Ratio	Pts
Switzerland	3	2	0	1	12	8	1.50	4
Czechoslovakia	3	2	0	1	3	2	1.50	4
Austria	3	2	0	1	7	6	1.17	4
Great Britain	3	0	0	3	6	12	0.50	0

== Consolation round 6-7 Place ==
January 17

Team #1	Score	Team #2
Poland	3:1	Belgium

== Tie-break Round ==
January 18

Team #1	Score	Team #2
Switzerland	3:1	Czechoslovakia
Czechoslovakia	3:1	Austria

January 19

Team #1	Score	Team #2
Switzerland	2:2	Austria

=== Standings Tie-break Round ===
	GP	W	T	L	GF	GA	Ratio	Pts
Switzerland	2	1	1	0	5	3	1.67	3
Czechoslovakia	2	1	0	1	4	4	1.00	2
Austria	2	0	1	1	3	5	0.60	1

=== Top goalscorers ===
Heinrich Meng (Switzerland), 13 goals
C. Ross Cuthbert (Great Britain), 13 goals

== Final standings ==
1	Switzerland
2	Czechoslovakia
3	Austria
4	Great Britain
5	France
6	Poland
7	Belgium
8	Italy
9	Spain

European Championship 1926 winner

Switzerland
First title
