= 1912 Ice Hockey European Championship =

The 1912 Ice Hockey European Championship was the third edition of the ice hockey tournament for European countries associated to the International Ice Hockey Federation.

The tournament was held from February 2–4, 1912, in Prague, Bohemia. With Bohemia and Germany finishing equal on points, Bohemia was declared champion based on goals scored (not taking into account goals against).

Following a protest by Germany, the tournament was declared null and void on March 22, 1912, on the grounds that Austria did not become a member of the IIHF until after the tournament.

== Results ==
February 2

Team #1	Score	Team #2
Bohemia	5:0	Austria

February 3

Team #1	Score	Team #2
Germany	4:1	Austria

February 4

Team #1	Score	Team #2
Bohemia	2:2	Germany

=== Final standings ===
	GP	W	T	L	GF	GA	DIF	Pts
Bohemia	2	1	1	0	7	2	+5	3
Germany	2	1	1	0	6	3	+3	3
Austria	2	0	0	2	1	9	-8	0

=== Top Goalscorer ===
Jaroslav Jirkovský (Bohemia), Lange (Germany) 3 goals

European Championship 1912 Winner
(annulled)

Bohemia
(would have been) Second title
