= 1922 Ice Hockey European Championship =

The 1922 Ice Hockey European Championship was the seventh edition of the ice hockey tournament for European countries associated to the International Ice Hockey Federation.

The tournament was played between February 14, and February 16, 1922, in St. Moritz, Switzerland, and it was won by Czechoslovakia, its third European Championship (including two wins as Bohemia, but not the 1912 tournament). They gained revenge for the previous year's defeat against the Swedes with a 3:2 victory.

== Results ==
February 14

Team #1	Score	Team #2
Switzerland	1:8	Czechoslovakia

February 15

Team #1	Score	Team #2
Switzerland	0:7	Sweden

February 16

Team #1	Score	Team #2
Czechoslovakia	3:2	Sweden

=== Top Goalscorer ===
Jaroslav Jirkovský (Czechoslovakia), 6 goals

European Championship 1922 winner

Czechoslovakia
First title
