= 1924 Ice Hockey European Championship =

The 1924 Ice Hockey European Championship was the ninth edition of the ice hockey tournament for European countries associated to the International Ice Hockey Federation.

The tournament was played between March 14, and March 17, 1924, in Milan, Italy, and it was won by France.

== Results ==
=== Group A ===
March 14

Team #1	Score	Team #2
Switzerland	12:0	Spain

March 15

Team #1	Score	Team #2
Sweden	6:2	Switzerland

March 16

Team #1	Score	Team #2
Sweden	w/o	Spain

==== Standings Group A ====
	GP	W	T	L	GF	GA	DIF	Pts
Sweden	2	2	0	0	6	2	+4	4
Switzerland	2	1	0	1	14	6	+8	2
Spain	2	0	0	2	0	12	-12	0

=== Group B ===
March 14

Team #1	Score	Team #2
Italy	0:12	France

March 15

Team #1	Score	Team #2
Italy	0:4	Belgium

March 16

Team #1	Score	Team #2
France	3:0	Belgium

==== Standings Group B ====
	GP	W	T	L	GF	GA	DIF	Pts
France	2	2	0	0	15	0	+15	4
Belgium	2	1	0	1	4	3	+1	2
Italy	2	0	0	2	0	16	-16	0

=== Final ===
March 17

Team #1	Score	Team #2
France	2:1	Sweden

==== Top Goalscorer ====
Albert De Rauch (France), 7 goals

European Championship 1924 winner

France
First title
