= Jaroslav Jirkovský =

Czech ice hockey player

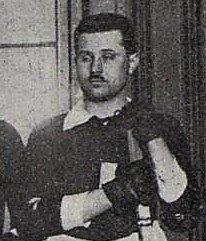
- Born: March 8, 1891 Prague, Austria-Hungary
- Died: November 2, 1971 (aged 80) Prague, Czechoslovakia
- Height: 5 ft 10 in (178 cm)
- Weight: 161 lb (73 kg; 11 st 7 lb)
- Position: Centre
- Shot: Left
- Played for: HC Slavia Praha
- National team: Czechoslovakia
- Playing career: 1908–1933

Jaroslav Jirkovský (March 8, 1891 - November 2, 1971) was a Czechoslovak ice hockey player who competed in the 1924 Winter Olympics.

In 1924 he participated with the Czechoslovak team in the first Winter Olympics ice hockey tournament.

Prior to his hockey career, Jirkovský played football for Slavia Prague and Bohemia.
