= 1921 Ice Hockey European Championship =

The 1921 Ice Hockey European Championship was the sixth edition of the ice hockey tournament for European countries associated to the International Ice Hockey Federation.

The tournament was played on February 23, 1921, at Stockholm, Sweden, and it was won by Sweden. Only two teams competed.

== Results ==
February 18

Team #1	Score	Team #2
Sweden	7:4	Czechoslovakia

=== Final standings ===
	GP	W	T	L	GF	GA	DIF	Pts
Sweden	1	1	0	0	7	4	+3	2
Czechoslovakia	1	0	0	1	4	7	-3	0

=== Top Goalscorers ===
- Erik Burman (Sweden), 3 goals
- Georg Johansson-Brandius (Sweden), 3 goals

European Championship 1921 winner

Sweden
First title
