= 1910 Ice Hockey European Championship =

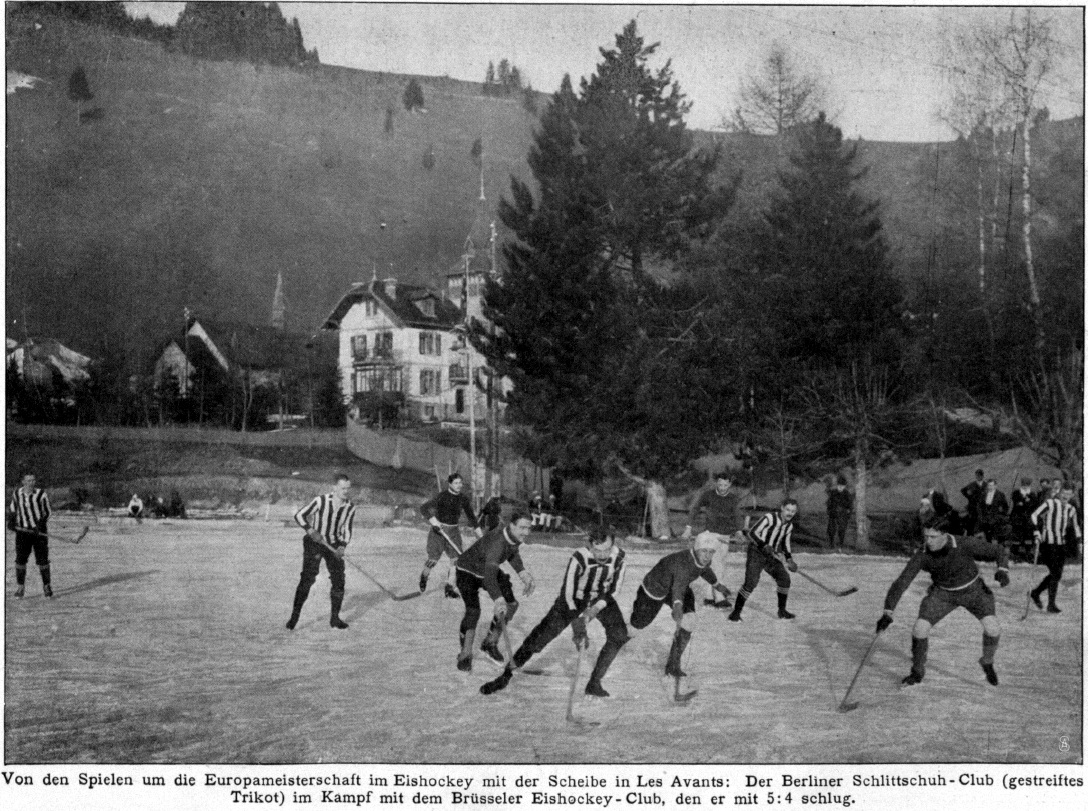
Game between Berliner Schlittschuhclub and Brussels Royal IHSC

The 1910 Ice Hockey European Championship was the first ice hockey tournament for European countries associated to the International Ice Hockey Federation, and was also the first official ice hockey tournament between national teams in history.

The tournament was played between January 10, and January 12, 1910, in Les Avants, near Montreux, Switzerland, and it was won by Great Britain.

The British team was commonly identified as England in contemporary accounts, but the IIHF recognizes this team as Great Britain.

The Oxford Canadians, a team made up of Canadian students from Oxford University, also participated in the tournament, but their games did not count in the final standings. They played three games, against Switzerland, Belgium, and Germany, winning all of them handily.

On the final day of the tournament, the schedule was changed due to poor ice conditions, leaving Great Britain was unable to play the Canadians at the rescheduled time as the team had to return home. The organizers declared the match a forfeit to the Canadians.

== Results ==
January 10

Team #1	Score	Team #2
Great Britain	1-1	Belgium
Switzerland	1-8	(Canada) Oxford Canadians
Great Britain	1-0	Germany
Switzerland	0-1	Belgium

January 11

Team #1	Score	Team #2
Germany	5-3	Belgium
Switzerland	1-5	Great Britain
(Canada) Oxford Canadians	4-0	Germany

January 12

Team #1	Score	Team #2
(Canada) Oxford Canadians	forfeit^{1}	Great Britain
(Canada) Oxford Canadians	6-0	Belgium
Switzerland	1-9	Germany

^{1} Great Britain were unable to play as the team had to travel home: Oxford Canadians won by forfeit.

=== Final standings ===
	GP	W	T	L	GF	GA	DIF	Pts
Great Britain	3	2	1	0	7	2	+5	5
Germany	3	2	0	1	14	5	+9	4
Belgium	3	1	1	1	5	6	-1	3
Switzerland	3	0	0	3	2	15	-13	0

=== Top Goalscorer ===
Werner Glimm (Germany), 4 goals

European Championship 1910 winner

Great Britain
First title
