= 1932 Ice Hockey European Championship =

The 1932 Ice Hockey European Championship was the 17th edition of the ice hockey tournament for European countries associated to the International Ice Hockey Federation. This was the last time it was played independent of the World Hockey Championships or the Olympics.

The tournament was played between March 14 and March 20, 1932, in Berlin, Germany, and Sweden won their fourth title.

Originally, the top two teams from each group were supposed to advance to a six-team final round. However, all three teams in group A tied both their games, and they all advanced under the rules in place.

As logistical issues prevented a final round with seven teams, the second-place teams in group B and group C, France and Great Britain, agreed to withdraw from the final round in favor of playing in the consolation round.

== First round ==
=== Group A ===
March 14

Team #1	Score	Team #2
Germany	1:1	Switzerland

March 15

Team #1	Score	Team #2
Austria	2:2	Switzerland

March 16

Team #1	Score	Team #2
Germany	1:1	Austria

==== Standings Group A ====
	GP	W	T	L	GF	GA	DIF	Pts
Austria	2	0	2	0	3	3	0	2
Switzerland	2	0	2	0	3	3	0	2
Germany	2	0	2	0	2	2	0	2

=== Group B ===
March 14

Team #1	Score	Team #2
Czechoslovakia	1:1	France

March 15

Team #1	Score	Team #2
Czechoslovakia	7:0	Latvia

March 16

Team #1	Score	Team #2
France	1:0	Latvia

==== Standings Group B ====
	GP	W	T	L	GF	GA	DIF	Pts
Czechoslovakia	2	1	1	0	8	1	+7	3
France	2	1	1	0	2	1	+1	3
Latvia	2	0	0	2	0	8	-8	0

=== Group C ===
March 14

Team #1	Score	Team #2
Great Britain	1:0	Romania

March 15

Team #1	Score	Team #2
Sweden	4:1	Great Britain

March 16

Team #1	Score	Team #2
Sweden	4:0	Romania

==== Standings Group C ====
	GP	W	T	L	GF	GA	DIF	Pts
Sweden	2	2	0	0	8	1	+7	4
Great Britain	2	1	0	1	2	4	-2	2
Romania	2	0	0	2	0	5	-5	0

== Consolation round 6-9 Place ==
March 17

Team #1	Score	Team #2
France	3:3	Great Britain
Latvia	3:0	Romania

March 18

Team #1	Score	Team #2
France	5:0	Romania
Great Britain	5:2	Latvia

=== Standings Consolation round ===
	GP	W	T	L	GF	GA	DIF	Pts
France	3	2	1	0	9	3	+6	5
Great Britain	3	2	1	0	9	5	+4	5
Latvia	3	1	0	2	5	6	-1	2
Romania	3	0	0	3	0	9	-9	0

Notes

- Carried over from First Round: France 1 Latvia 0; G. Britain 1 Romania 0

== Final round ==
March 17

Team #1	Score	Team #2
Austria	3:0	Czechoslovakia
Sweden	1:1	Switzerland

March 18

Team #1	Score	Team #2
Sweden	0:0	Austria
Germany	1:0	Czechoslovakia

March 19

Team #1	Score	Team #2
Sweden	2:0	Czechoslovakia

March 20

Team #1	Score	Team #2
Germany	0:1	Sweden
Switzerland	3:2	Czechoslovakia

=== Standings Final Round ===
	GP	W	T	L	GF	GA	DIF	Pts
Sweden	4	2	2	0	4	1	+3	6
Austria	4	1	3	0	6	3	+3	5
Switzerland	4	1	3	0	7	6	+1	5
Germany	4	1	2	1	3	3	0	4
Czechoslovakia	4	0	0	4	2	9	-7	0

Notes

- Carried over from First Round: Germany 1 Switzerland 1; Switzerland 2 Austria 2; Germany 1 Austria 1

=== Top Goalscorer ===
Gerry Davey (G. Britain), 7 goals

European Championship 1932 winner

Sweden
Third title
