= 1923 Ice Hockey European Championship =

Ice hockey championship

The 1923 Ice Hockey European Championship was the eighth edition of the ice hockey tournament for European countries associated to the International Ice Hockey Federation.

The tournament was played between March 7, and March 11, 1923, in Antwerp, Belgium, and was won by Sweden.

== Results ==
March 7

Team #1	Score	Team #2
Sweden	4:2	Czechoslovakia
Belgium	1:4	France

March 8

Team #1	Score	Team #2
Belgium	3:2	Switzerland
Sweden	4:3	France

March 9

Team #1	Score	Team #2
France	2:1	Czechoslovakia
Sweden	6:0	Switzerland

March 10

Team #1	Score	Team #2
Belgium	0:3	Czechoslovakia
France	4:2	Switzerland

March 11

Team #1	Score	Team #2
Czechoslovakia	10:3	Switzerland
Belgium	1:9	Sweden

=== Final standings ===
	GP	W	T	L	GF	GA	DIF	Pts
Sweden	4	4	0	0	23	6	+17	8
France	4	3	0	1	13	8	+5	6
Czechoslovakia	4	2	0	2	16	9	+7	4
Belgium	4	1	0	3	5	18	-13	2
Switzerland	4	0	0	4	7	23	-16	0

=== Top Goalscorer ===
Léon Quaglia (France), 10 goals

European Championship 1923 winner

Sweden
Second title
