= 1914 Ice Hockey European Championship =

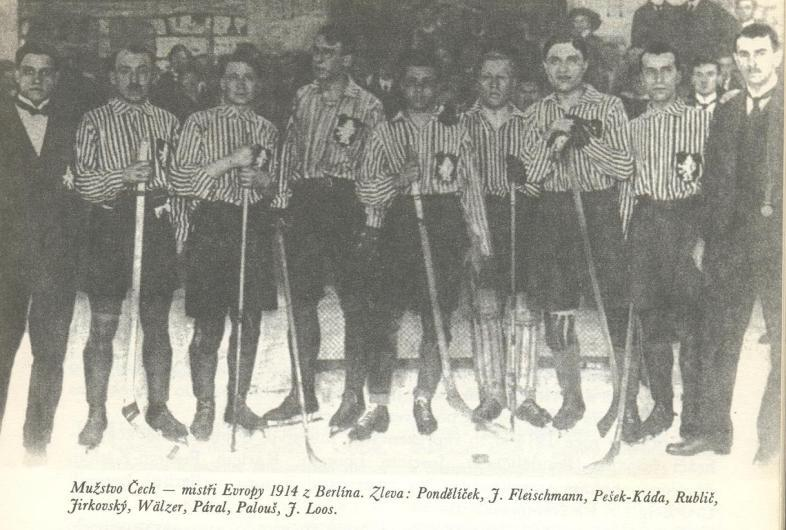
Team Bohemia — Ice Hockey European Champions, 1914

The 1914 Ice Hockey European Championship was the fifth edition of the ice hockey tournament for European countries associated to the International Ice Hockey Federation.

The tournament was played between 25 February and 27 February 1914, in Berlin, Germany, and it was won by Bohemia.

== Results ==
25 February

Team #1	Score	Team #2
Bohemia	9:1	Belgium

26 February

Team #1	Score	Team #2
Germany	4:1	Belgium

27 February

Team #1	Score	Team #2
Germany	0:2	Bohemia

=== Final standings ===
	GP	W	T	L	GF	GA	DIF	Pts
Bohemia	2	2	0	0	11	1	+10	4
Germany	2	1	0	1	4	3	+1	2
Belgium	2	0	0	2	2	13	-11	0

=== Top Goalscorer ===
Jaroslav Jirkovský (Bohemia), 7 goals

European Championship 1914 winner

Bohemia
Second title
