= 1913 Ice Hockey European Championship =

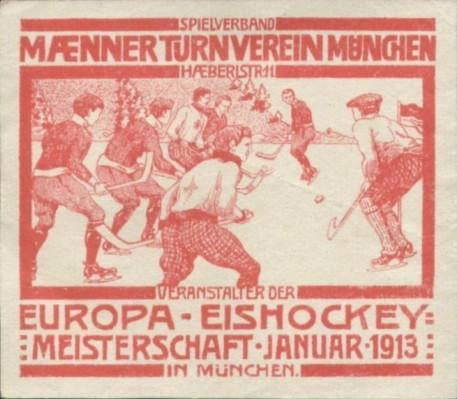
Poster (in German) for the 1913 Ice Hockey European Championship

The 1913 Ice Hockey European Championship was the fourth edition of the ice hockey tournament for European countries associated to the International Ice Hockey Federation.

The tournament was played between January 25, and January 27, 1913, in Munich, Germany. With Belgium and Bohemia finishing equal on points, Belgium was declared champion based on goal difference.

== Results ==
January 25

Team #1	Score	Team #2
Belgium	4:4	Bohemia

January 26

Team #1	Score	Team #2
Germany	5:8	Belgium
Belgium	13:1	Austria
Germany	2:4	Bohemia

January 27

Team #1	Score	Team #2
Bohemia	7:0	Austria
Germany	14:4	Austria

=== Final standings ===
	GP	W	T	L	GF	GA	DIF	Pts
Belgium	3	2	1	0	25	10	+15	5
Bohemia	3	2	1	0	15	6	+9	5
Germany	3	1	0	2	21	16	+5	2
Austria	3	0	0	3	5	34	-29	0

=== Top Goalscorer ===
Maurice Deprez (Belgium), 7 goals

European Championship 1913 winner

Belgium
First title
