= 1911 Ice Hockey European Championship =

The 1911 Ice Hockey European Championship was the second edition of the ice hockey tournament for European countries associated to the International Ice Hockey Federation.

The tournament was played between February 15, and February 17, 1911, in Berlin, Germany, and it was won by Bohemia.

== Results ==
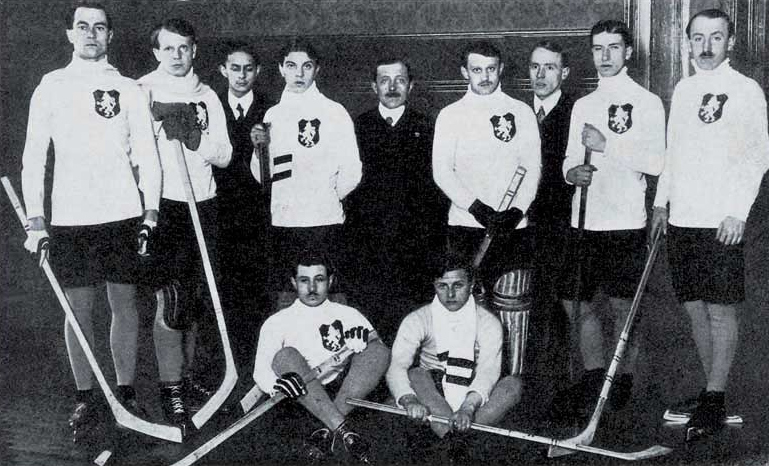
Bohemia, who won the tournament.

February 15

| Team #1 | Score | Team #2 |
|---|---|---|
| Bohemia | 13:0 | Switzerland |
| Germany | 1:4 | Bohemia |

February 16

| Team #1 | Score | Team #2 |
|---|---|---|
| Germany | 6:0 | Belgium |
| Belgium | 5:4 | Switzerland |

February 17

| Team #1 | Score | Team #2 |
|---|---|---|
| Bohemia | 3:0 | Belgium |
| Germany | 10:0 | Switzerland |

=== Final standings ===
| | GP | W | T | L | GF | GA | DIF | Pts |
|---|---|---|---|---|---|---|---|---|
| Bohemia | 3 | 3 | 0 | 0 | 20 | 1 | +19 | 6 |
| Germany | 3 | 2 | 0 | 1 | 17 | 4 | +13 | 4 |
| Belgium | 3 | 1 | 0 | 2 | 5 | 13 | -8 | 2 |
| Switzerland | 3 | 0 | 0 | 3 | 4 | 28 | -24 | 0 |

=== Top Goalscorer ===
Jaroslav Jirkovský (Bohemia), 9 goals

European Championship 1911 winner

Bohemia
First title
