= Ice hockey at the 1920 Summer Olympics – Rosters =

List of ice hockey players

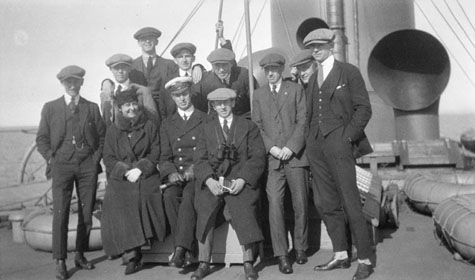
The Winnipeg Falcons en route to the 1920 Olympics, where they won the inaugural gold medal in ice hockey (photo includes an unidentified ships' officer and a woman)

The 1920 Summer Olympics ice hockey rosters consisted of 60 players on 7 national ice hockey teams. Played at the Olympic Games for the first time, and later regarded by the International Ice Hockey Federation (IIHF) as the first World Championship. Teams were required to be strictly amateur, so players from the Canadian-based National Hockey League (NHL) or other professional leagues were excluded. Canada sent the Winnipeg Falcons, who had won the 1920 Allan Cup, the amateur championship in Canada.

The matches were played 7 per side with 3 forwards, 2 defencemen, a rover, and a goaltender with no substitutions during the match. Due to the tournaments format that saw some teams only play a single match several teams brought players that would never see the ice.

== Legend ==
Positions
F	Forward
D	Defenceman
R	Rover
G	Goaltender

Statistics
GP	Games played
G	Goals

== Teams ==
=== Belgium ===
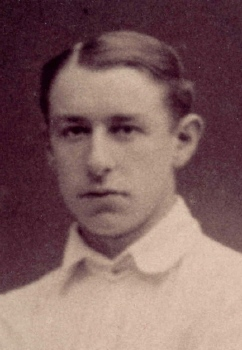
Paul Loicq played for Belgium

Coach: (Belgium) Paul Loicq

Pos	Player	GP	G	Birthdate	Age	Club
F	Maurice Deprez	1	0	November 12, 1888	31	N/A
R	Paul Goeminne	1	0	1888	~32	(Belgium) CP Bruxelles
F	Jean-Maurice Goossens	1	0	January 16, 1892	28	(Belgium) CP Bruxelles
F	Paul Loicq	1	0	August 11, 1888	31	(Belgium) CP Bruxelles
D	Philippe Van Volckxsom	1	0	May 1, 1897	23	N/A
D	Gaston Van Volxem	1	0	April 24, 1895	25	(Belgium) CP Bruxelles
G	François Vergult	1	0	April 21, 1891	29	(Belgium) CP Bruxelles

=== Canada ===
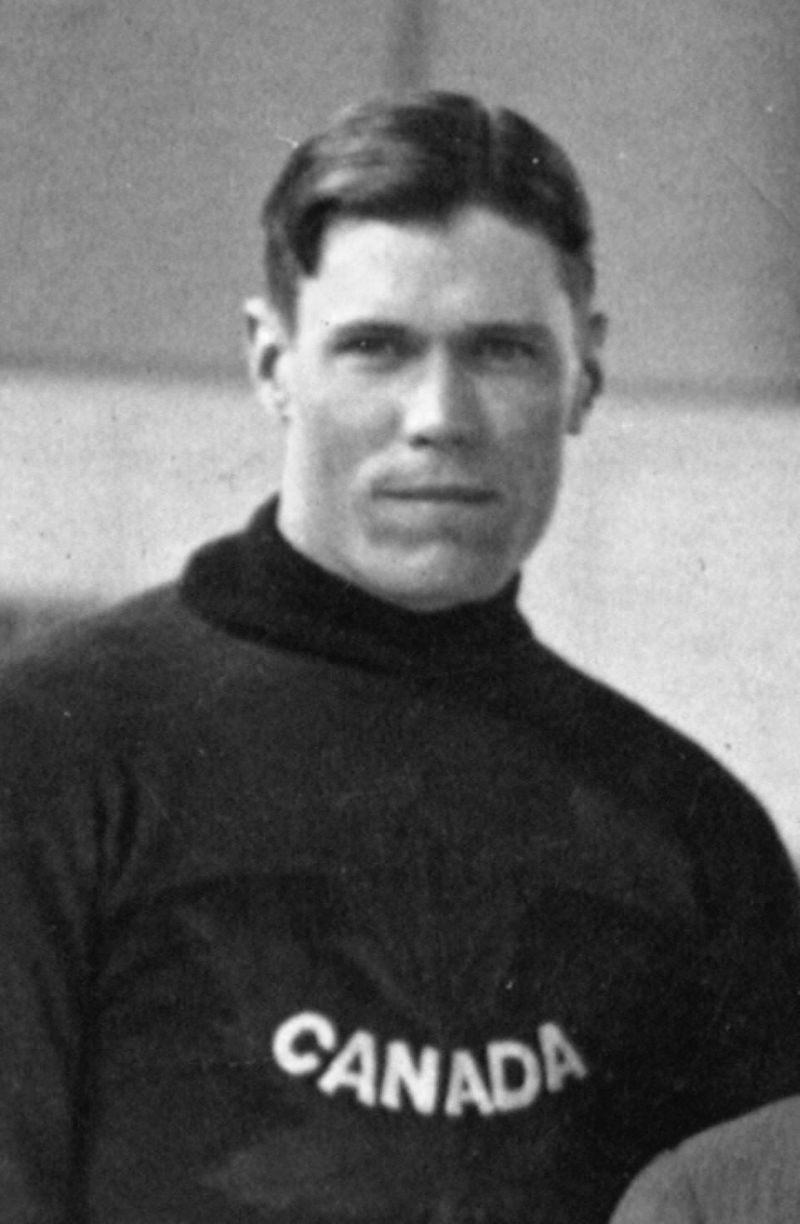
Frank Fredrickson led Canada in scoring

Canada elected to send the Winnipeg Falcons who won the 1920 Allan Cup, a championship to declare the top amateur hockey team in the country.

Coach: (Iceland) Guðmundur Sigurjónsson

Pos	Player	GP	G	Birthdate	Age	Club
D	Bobby Benson	3	1	May 18, 1894	25	(Canada) Winnipeg Falcons
G	Wally Byron	3	0	September 2, 1884	35	(Canada) Winnipeg Falcons
F	Frank Fredrickson	3	12	June 3, 1895	24	(Canada) Winnipeg Falcons
R	Chris Fridfinnson	1	1	June 14, 1898	21	(Canada) Winnipeg Falcons
F	Mike Goodman	3	3	March 18, 1898	22	(Canada) Winnipeg Falcons
F	Haldor Halderson	3	9	January 7, 1898	22	(Canada) Winnipeg Falcons
D	Konnie Johannesson	3	2	August 10, 1896	23	(Canada) Winnipeg Falcons
R	Huck Woodman	2	1	March 11, 1899	21	(Canada) Winnipeg Falcons

=== Czechoslovakia ===
Coach: (Czechoslovakia) Adolf Dušek

Pos	Player	GP	G	Birthdate	Age	Club
R	Karel Hartmann	3	0	July 6, 1885	34	(Czechoslovakia) HC Sparta Praha
F	Valentin Loos	3	0	April 13, 1895	25	(Czechoslovakia) HC Slavia Praha
D	Jan Palouš	3	0	October 25, 1888	31	(Czechoslovakia) HC Slavia Praha
G	Jan Peka	2	0	July 27, 1894	25	(Czechoslovakia) HC Sparta Praha
F	Karel Pešek	3	0	September 20, 1895	24	(Czechoslovakia) HC Sparta Praha
F	Josef Šroubek	3	1	December 2, 1891	28	(Czechoslovakia) CSS Praha
D	Otto Vindyš	3	0	April 9, 1889	31	(Czechoslovakia) HC Slavia Praha
G	Karel Wälzer	1	0	August 28, 1888	31	(Czechoslovakia) CSS Praha

=== France ===
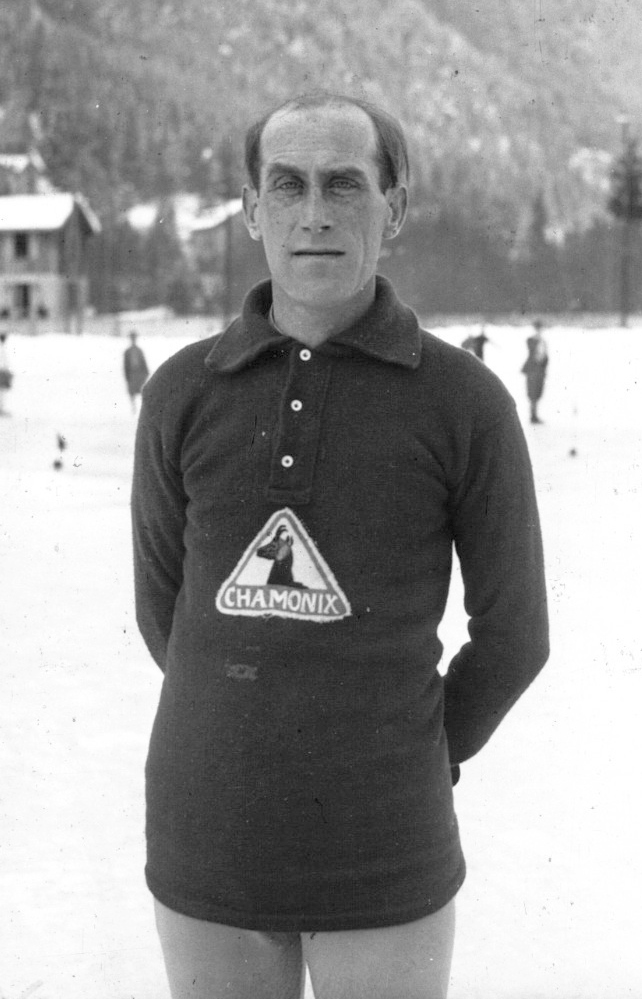
Léonhard Quaglia played for France

Coach: (Canada) Ernie Garon

Pos	Player	GP	G	Birthdate	Age	Club
D	Jean Chaland	1	0	September 8, 1881	38	(France) Chamonix
R	Pierre Charpentier	1	0	March 28, 1888	32	(France) Ice Skating Club Paris
D	Henri Couttet	1	0	June 8, 1901	18	(France) Chamonix
F	Georges Dary	1	0	December 6, 1889	30	(France) Ice Skating Club Paris
F	Alfred Antoine de Rauch	1	0	June 1, 1887	32	(France) Ice Skating Club Paris
G	Jacques Gaittet	1	0	August 15, 1889	28	(France) Ice Skating Club Paris
F	Léon Quaglia	1	0	January 4, 1896	24	(France) Chamonix

=== Sweden ===
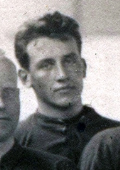
Erik Burman led Sweden in scoring with 4 goals.

Nils Molander, David Säfwenberg and Hans-Jacob Mattsson had ice hockey experience outside Sweden but the rest were drawn from local bandy clubs.

Coach: (United States) Raoul Le Mat

Pos	Player	GP	G	Birthdate	Age	Club
R/D	Wilhelm Arwe	3	2	January 28, 1898	22	(Sweden) IK Göta
F	Erik Burman	5	4	December 6, 1897	22	(Sweden) IK Göta
G	Seth Howander	5	0	October 6, 1892	27	(Sweden) IFK Uppsala
G	Albin Jansson	1	0	October 9, 1897	22	(Sweden) Järva IS
F	Georg Johansson	6	3	May 10, 1898	21	(Sweden) IK Göta
F	Einar Lindqvist	6	3	May 31, 1895	24	(Sweden) IFK Uppsala
R/D	Einar Lundell	5	0	January 9, 1894	26	(Sweden) IK Göta
F/D	Hans-Jacob Mattsson	1	0	June 2, 1890	30	N/A
R	Nils Molander	4	2	May 22, 1889	30	(Germany) Berliner Schlittschuhclub
F	David Säfwenberg	1	1	October 1, 1896	23	(Germany) Berliner Sport Club
R	Einar Svensson	5	2	September 27, 1894	25	(Sweden) IK Göta

=== Switzerland ===
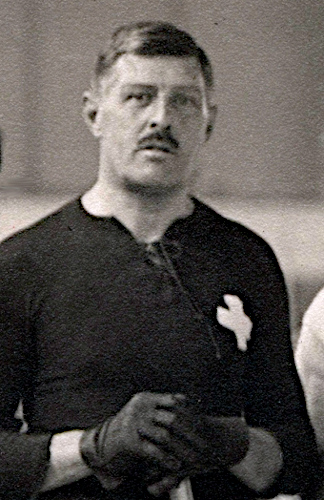
Max Sillig played for Switzerland

Coach: (Switzerland) Max Sillig

Pos	Player	GP	G	Birthdate	Age	Club
F	Rodolphe Cuendet	1	0	1891	~25	(Switzerland) Genève-Servette HC
R	Louis Dufour Jr.	2	0	July 26, 1901	18	(Switzerland) HC Rosey Gstaad
D/F	Max Holzboer	1	0	July 29, 1883	37	(Germany) Berliner Schlittschuhclub
D	Marius Jaccard	2	0	March 27, 1898	22	(Switzerland) CP Lausanne
F	Bruno Leuzinger	1	0	January 6, 1886	34	(Switzerland) HC Châteu d'Oex
D	Paul Lob	2	0	July 13, 1893	26	(Switzerland) Genève-Servette HC
G	René Savoie	2	0	February 9, 1896	24	N/A
F	Max Sillig	1	0	November 19, 1873	46	N/A
D	Louis Dufour Sr.	1	0	1873	~47	N/A

=== United States ===
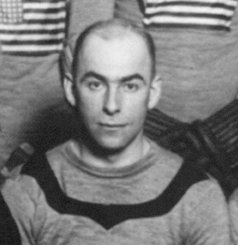
American Herb Drury led the tournament in scoring, with 14 goals

Originally the United States planned to send the winner of an elimination playoff but ultimately scrapped the idea.

Coach: (United States) Cornelius Fellowes

Pos	Player	GP	G	Birthdate	Age	Club
G	Raymond Bonney	2	0	April 5, 1892	28	(United States) Pittsburgh AA
F	Anthony Conroy	4	10	October 19, 1895	24	(United States) St. Paul AC
R	Herb Drury	4	14	March 2, 1896	24	(United States) Pittsburgh AA
D	Ed Fitzgerald	2	1	August 3, 1891	28	(United States) St. Paul AC
D	George Geran	2	3	August 3, 1896	23	(United States) Boston AA
R	Frank Goheen	4	7	February 8, 1894	26	(United States) St. Paul AC
F	Joe McCormick	3	8	August 12, 1894	25	(United States) Pittsburgh AA
F	Larry McCormick	1	7	July 12, 1888	31	(United States) Pittsburgh AA
R	Frank Synott	2	1	December 28, 1890	29	(United States) Boston AA
D	Leon Tuck	2	1	May 25, 1891	28	(United States) Boston AA
G	Cy Weidenborner	2	0	March 30, 1895	25	(United States) St. Paul AC

== Bibliography ==
- Duplacey, James (1998), Total Hockey: The official encyclopedia of the National Hockey League, Total Sports, ISBN 0-8362-7114-9
- Hansen, Kenth (May 1996), "The Birth of Swedish Ice Hockey – Antwerp 1920", Citius, Altiu, Fortius, 4 (2): 5–27
- Podnieks, Andrew (2010), IIHF Media Guide & Record Book 2011, Moydart Press
- Wallechinsky, David; Loucky, Jaime (2005), The Complete Book of the Winter Olympics: Turin 2006 Edition, Wilmington, Delaware: Sport Media Publishing, ISBN 1-894963-45-8
