= Roy Schooley =

- Born: April 13, 1880; Welland, Ontario, Canada
- Died: November 13, 1933 (aged 53); Pittsburgh, Pennsylvania, USA
- Education: Toronto
- Occupations: Hockey referee in the WPHL; Treasurer of the USAHA; Manager of the Duquesne Garden; Owner of the Pittsburgh Yellow Jackets; City of Pittsburgh Treasurer; Campaign Manager
- Years active: 1901-1932
- Political party: Republican
- Spouse: Flora Mathilda Hein Schooley
- Children: Robert Enoch Schooley; Roy Walter Schooley

Medal record

Representing the United States

Men's ice hockey
Silver medal – second place	1920 Antwerp	Team Competition (Manager)

Roy Dunlap Schooley (April 13, 1880 – November 13, 1933) was a former hockey referee who later became the manager of both Duquesne Garden, located in Pittsburgh, Pennsylvania, and the Pittsburgh Yellow Jackets of the United States Amateur Hockey Association. In 1925, the Yellow Jackets hockey club, evolved into the Pittsburgh Pirates of the National Hockey League. On March 16, 1920 at the Duquesne Garden, he helped found USA Hockey, the governing body for amateur ice hockey in the United States. That same year, he assembled the first U.S. Olympic Hockey Team which won a silver medal at the 1920 Summer Olympics in Antwerp, Belgium and is credited with helping to foster the growth of hockey in the country.

Outside of sports, also Schooley worked as the treasurer to the City of Pittsburgh and as the campaign manager to Edward V. Babcock, who would go on to become Pittsburgh's mayor in 1918. However a purchasing scandal forced him from his position in 1931, which soon developed to a jury indictment of Schooley on embezzlement and misdemeanor charges. Schooley was unable to attend his trial due to his failing health. The trial was postponed indefinitely and charges were still pending at the time of his death in November 1933.

== Biography ==
=== Hockey referee ===
Despite his positive impact in promoting ice hockey in the United States, Schooley was actually born in Canada. On April 13, 1880, he was born in Welland, Ontario. He studied law at the University of Toronto, however his fascination with sports diverted him away from that career path. Schooley then came to Pittsburgh in 1901 and worked as a hockey referee. Since the sport was new to most Pennsylvanians, he was viewed as an expert on the sport. Schooley officiated several of the teams associated with the Western Pennsylvania Hockey League (WPHL), the first hockey league to openly hire and trade players. During the 1903-04 season officiated inner-state six games between the Portage Lakes Hockey Club and several teams from the WPHL. He also served as a referee at the Duquesne Garden from 1906-1908. However the Pittsburgh Press reported on January 5, 1908, that he resigned from his officiating duties, because he could not arrange to with his employers to get away two nights of the week at referee games. On January 14, 1908, the Pittsburgh Press made mention of Schooley returning to work as the referee of a game between the Pittsburgh Athletic Club and the Pittsburgh Lyceum. Schooley became a nationalized citizen of the United States on September 27, 1912.

=== Hockey manager ===
==== USAHA and the Yellow Jackets ====
After his career in politics, Schooley founded the Pittsburgh's amateur hockey team, the Yellow Jackets in 1915, and became the manager of the Duquesne Garden. As with all American teams of this era, the Yellow Jackets fell under the jurisdiction of the International Skating Union. In late October, 1920, the United States Amateur Hockey Association was formed, with Yellow Jackets officials Schooley and William S. Haddock serving as co-founders and respectively acting as the league's secretary-treasurer and president. However outside of his league and manager duties, Schooley also served as his team's coach at times. On December 5, 1922, he briefly took over coaching duties for the Pittsburgh Yellow Jackets at the request of the team's coach, Dinny Manners, to prepare the team against the Toronto Argonauts.

According to former sports reporter Paul Sullivan, who covered hockey for much of his life for the Pittsburgh Gazette Times, the USAHA was not a completely amateur league. Sullivan noted that even though the USAHA was called an amateur league, "They didn't come down from Canada because they thought Pittsburgh was a nice place." This leads one to believe that money was paid out to top players in the league. The eastern teams of USAHA soon imported Canadian players to add to their rosters of local players. In 1923, Schooley had invited Lionel Conacher, a future Hall of Famer, to come and ref in Pittsburgh in February 1923, "to see if the crowd would take to him". Schooley then asked Conacher to play with the Pittsburgh Yellow Jackets in a four-game series against his former teammates, and the Toronto Aura Lee hockey team, and against the Hamilton Tigers. Conacher impressed the Pittsburgh fans by scoring 11 of the Yellow Jackets' 23 goals in the four games. Conacher then under the guidance of Roy Schooley, transformed the Yellow Jackets line-up to an almost Canadian team. Schooley then used his connections in the Pittsburgh media to promote Conacher to the city's hockey fans. After seeing how well the fans took to Conacher, Schooley made him the team's captain, and asked him to invite a number of his friends to play for the Yellow Jackets. These players included Harold Cotton, Hib Milks, Harold Darragh, Rodger Smith, Duke McCurry "Tex" White and goalie Roy Worters. During his time in hockey, Schooley often traveled with his teams often enjoying a wide acquaintance among hockey fans in every city that had a team.

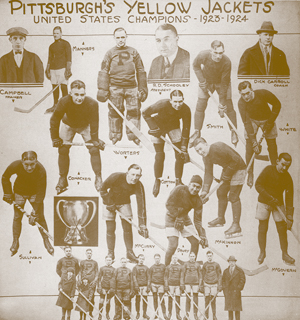
Schooley's Yellow Jackets won the USAHA title in 1924 and 1925.

Schooley's skills as the team's manager brought the franchise USAHA championships in 1924 and 1925. The Yellow Jackets stopped playing when the United States Amateur Hockey Association folded at the end of the 1924–25 season. In the fall of 1925, the former Yellow Jackets players entered the National Hockey League as an expansion team named the Pittsburgh Pirates.

After five seasons in Pittsburgh, the Pirates left the city and became the short-lived Philadelphia Quakers, due to issues related to the Great Depression and the failure to find a replacement for the aging Duquesne Garden. Shortly afterwards, Schooley along with partners James Callahan and Horace Townsend created a second iteration of the Yellow Jackets by taking over the Niagara Falls franchise in the International Hockey League and transferring it to Pittsburgh. Schooley was president of the new team, which competed in the International Hockey League from 1930 to 1932.

==== 1920 U.S Hockey team ====
In 1920, Schooley became the manager of the U.S. Olympic Hockey Team. As manager of the Olympic squad, he had full power to select the players for the team. Schooley knew the Pittsburgh players well enough and also evaluated other players from both Boston and St. Paul, when they were at the Duquesne Garden for games in early to mid-March. On March 16, 1920 he named his team. Forwards: Joe McCormick, Larry McCormick and Herb Drury of Pittsburgh; Frank " Moose" Goheen and Anthony Conroy of St. Paul; and George Geran and Frank Synott of Boston. Defensemen: Irving Small and Leon Tuck of Boston; and Ed Fitzgerald of St. Paul. Goaltenders: Raymond Bonney of Pittsburgh and Cyril Weidenborner of St. Paul. Schooley later named Joe McCormick from Pittsburgh as the team's captain.

However $15,000 was still need to fund the team's trip to Antwerp, so Schooley used the Duquesne Garden as the source of the funds. His intent was to play two series of two games each against "worthy" opponents at the Gardens. The first series on March 22–23 would be against the Winnipegs, while an opponent remained to be named for March 29–30 games. All money beyond the guarantee paid to the visitors and "bare overhead expenses" would go to the Olympic team.

Even though Schooley formed the team and managed them up until they left for the Games, he did not represent them during the Olympics. Three days before the team was to depart for Antwerp to begin Olympic play, the New York Post reported that Schooley had resigned as manager amid rumors of unspecified friction, which he denied. He cited a family illness as the reason. Schooley was then succeeded by Corneilus Fellows. Whatever the reason for Schooley's departure, the Post commented with considerable justification that "the absence of the man who organized and coached the Olympiad team since its formation will be a distinct loss to the American team…" The team that Schooley built won a silver medal at the Antwerp Games.

=== Media and politics ===
It was during this time that he also became a reporter for the Pittsburgh Chronicle Telegraph and the Gazette Times. After working on a few general assignments, Schooley was promoted to covering city politics. He soon became a member of the Republican Party and gained the backing of those politically active in the city and county. Political officials were impressed with his executive ability and his faculty of grasping political situations, leading Schooley to become the leading figure in several campaigns. He soon was put in charge of Joseph G. Armstrong's 1913 mayoral bid. Once Armstrong was elected mayor in 1914, Schooley was given the title "Secretary to the Mayor". However, after a series of newspaper attacks against the Armstrong Administration, Schooley was transferred to the position of city clerk in charge of the Pittsburgh public works division.

In 1917 Schooley became the campaign manager for Edward V. Babcock, who would go on to become Pittsburgh's mayor in 1918. After Babcock's victory, Schooley was made the city treasurer. He later became the superintendent for the city's bureau of recreation. In 1926, he helped elect John S. Fisher, Governor of Pennsylvania as well as assist Charles H. Kline in getting re-elected mayor of Pittsburgh. Schooley was then reappointed as the city's treasurer. However, he was forced from the Treasurer's Office in 1931, the result of a purchasing scandal. The failure of the Franklin Savings and Trust Company, brought forth an audit of the Treasurer's Office, since that office was in charge of distributing funds linked to the company. The audit revealed that the city's money was not protected by bonds, as required by law. Other irregularities soon developed which led to a jury indictment of Schooley on embezzlement and misdemeanor charges. Schooley was then removed from office by Charles Kline, who himself was under fire for the scandal.

At the same time, Schooley became ill and was unable to even leave his home to attend his own trial. The hearing was postponed indefinitely and charges were still pending at the time of his death. He died at his home in Pittsburgh on November 13, 1933, surrounded by his friends and family.
