= Walter Byron =

Walter Byron may refer to:

- Walter Byron (ice hockey)
- Walter Byron (actor)
