= Larry McCormick =

Larry McCormick may refer to:

- Larry McCormick (died 2026), founder of Bands of America.
- Larry McCormick (TV) (1933–2004), actor and news anchor/reporter
- Larry McCormick (Canadian politician) (1940–2011)
- Lawrence McCormick (1890–1961), Canadian-American ice hockey player
