= James Callahan (ice hockey) =

Attorney and hockey executive

James Francis Callahan (April 1, 1893 – May 25, 1961) was an American attorney who was president and minority owner of the Pittsburgh Pirates of the National Hockey League.

== Career ==
Callahan was legal adviser of the Pittsburgh Pirates hockey club under its original owner Henry Townsend. Callahan continued in that role when Townsend died and left the franchise to his sons Horace and Edward. In the fall of 1928, the Pirates were ostensibly sold to ex-lightweight boxing champion Benny Leonard, although the money for the purchase is suspected to have come from Bill Dwyer, owner of the New York Americans. At this point Callahan was made president of the Pirates. Callahan was also a minority stockholder.

Shortly after the Pirates moved to Philadelphia in 1930 to become the Philadelphia Quakers, Callahan became secretary and treasurer of the new Pittsburgh Yellow Jackets of the International Hockey League, which took over the franchise of the defunct Niagara Falls Cataracts.
