= Hans-Jacob Mattsson =

Swedish ice hockey player

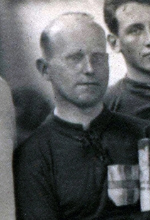
- Mattsson at the 1920 Olympics.
- Born: 2 June 1890 Gävle, Sweden
- Died: 1 December 1980 (aged 90) Gävle, Sweden
- Position: Right wing
- National team: Sweden
- Playing career: 1919–1920

Hans-Jacob Emanuel "Knubben" Mattsson (2 June 1890 – 1 December 1980) was a Swedish ice hockey player who competed in the 1920 Summer Olympics. In 1920 he was a member of the Swedish ice hockey team which finished fourth in the Summer Olympics tournament. He played one match.
