= Pittsburgh Yellow Jackets =

Pittsburgh Yellow Jackets was the name of three separate ice hockey teams based at Duquesne Garden in Pittsburgh, Pennsylvania. The original team was part of the United States Amateur Hockey Association (USAHA) from 1920 to 1925 and developed from predecessors dating back to 1915. After winning the USAHA Championship in 1924 and 1925, the ostensibly amateur (but arguably semi-professional) Yellow Jackets turned fully professional and became the Pittsburgh Pirates of the National Hockey League. After the Pirates relocated in 1930 to play as the Philadelphia Quakers, a second Pittsburgh Yellow Jackets club (organized by the founder of the original club) played for two seasons in the International Hockey League, a minor professional circuit. A third Yellow Jackets team was organized at the amateur level in 1935 by John H. Harris and competed in the Eastern Amateur Hockey League before folding in 1937.

== Pittsburgh Yellow Jackets I ==
Pittsburgh Yellow Jackets
- City: Pittsburgh, Pennsylvania, United States
- League: USNHL (1918); USAHA (1920–1925)
- Founded: 1915
- Operated: 1916–1925
- Home arena: Duquesne Garden
- Colors: Gold, black (1916) Red, gray (1916–1920) Gold, black (1920–1925)

Franchise history
- 1916: Duquesne Garden hockey team
- 1916–1920: Pittsburgh Athletic Association
- 1920–1922: Pittsburgh Hockey Club
- 1922–1925: Pittsburgh Yellow Jackets

Championships
- League championships: 1 USNHL (1918); 2 USAHA (1923–24, 1924–25)
- Division championships: 2 (1923–24, 1924–25)

=== Origin ===
The roots of the Yellow Jackets trace back to the winter of 1915–16, when Roy Schooley, a local politician and former hockey referee, put together an amateur team to play exhibition games at the Duquesne Garden. Schooley brought in Canadian players including Dinny Manners, brothers Larry and Joe McCormick, and Russell McCrimmon. The team, known as the "Duquesne Garden hockey team" after its home arena, compiled a record of 20 wins, 3 losses and no ties in early 1916 against teams from Canada and the US. A highlight of the season was a three-game series sweep of the St. Paul (Minnesota) Athletic Club, which had won the MacNaughton Cup as champion of the American Hockey Association and had defeated the Lachine club of Canada, holders of the Art Ross Cup. After beating St. Paul, the Duquesne Garden team was claimed to be the hockey champion of the world, though this claim was not officially or widely recognized.

=== PAA era (1916–1920) ===
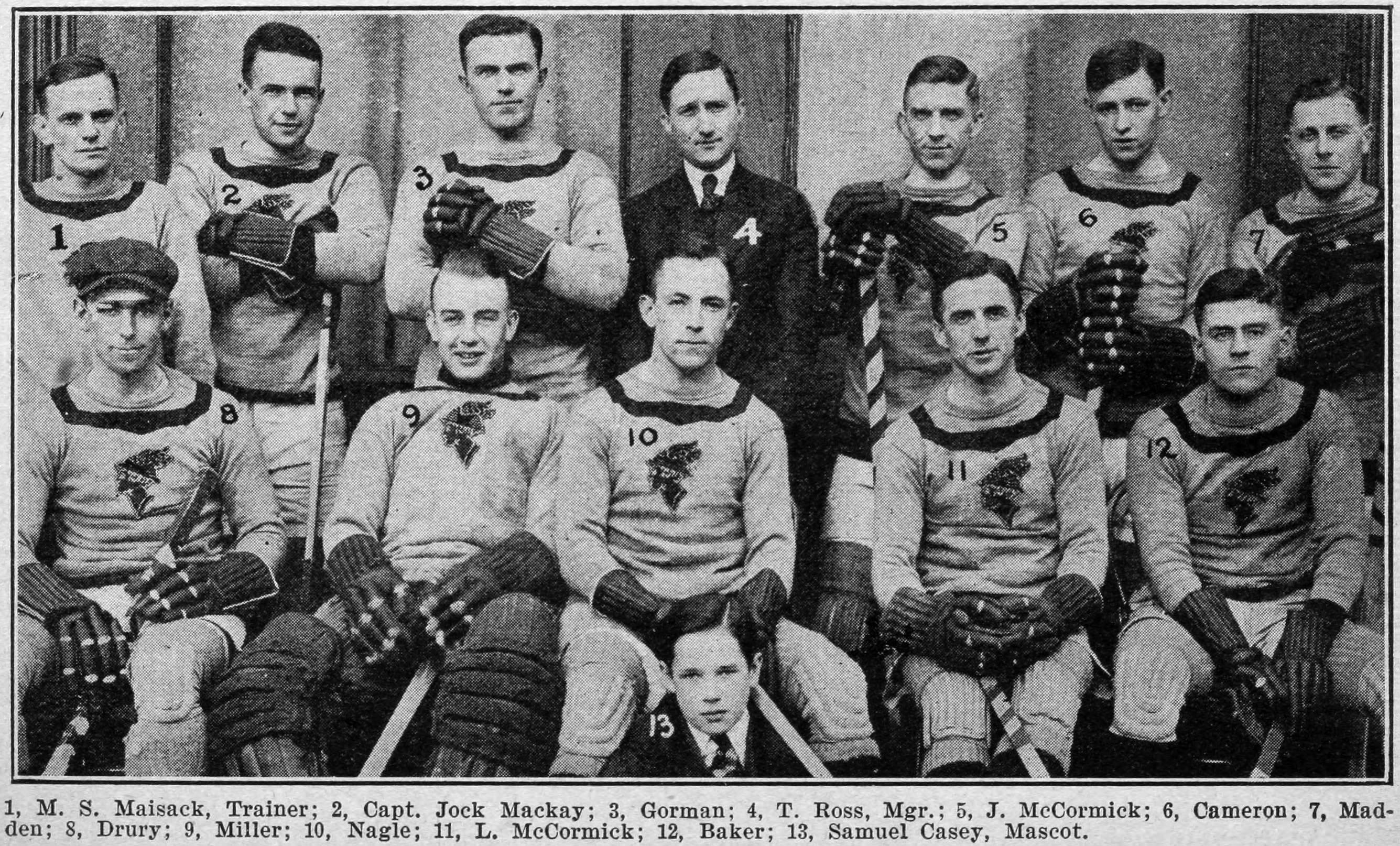
PAA team of 1916–17

After its first season, the Duquesne Garden exhibition team established an affiliation with the Pittsburgh Athletic Association (PAA), a private athletic and social club, adopting that organization's name, colors, and "Winged Head" insignia. The team finished its 1916–17 campaign with a 37–3–0 record. A late-season addition to the roster was Herb Drury, an immediate star who would remain with the team and all its successors through to the final one, the Philadelphia Quakers.

During the winter of 1917–18 the PAA team joined the New York Wanderers, Boston Arenas and Boston Navy Yard in forming the United States National Hockey League, which would last only one season. The PAA won the league title and went on to defeat the Montreal Hochelaga club, holders of the Art Ross Cup, in an international amateur championship series to win a new honor called the Fellowes international trophy. That season's overall record of 24–3–2 included a 22-game winning streak.

There was no 1918–19 season for the PAA, with Duquesne Garden being used as a barracks and most of the players in military service. The team resumed its dominance in 1919–20, going 25–5–3 playing an independent schedule.

==== First Olympic ice hockey ====
The PAA team figured prominently in the formation of the first U.S. Olympic ice hockey team. When the sport was about to debut as an Olympic competition at the 1920 Games in Antwerp, Belgium, the PAA won a three-team American tournament (with Boston AA and St. Paul AC) that was originally supposed to determine which one of the clubs would be sent intact to the Olympics to represent the United States. However, as it became clear that no team had enough US-eligible players to furnish a full Olympic roster, it was decided to choose representatives from all three of the teams. Four of the eleven selections were from the PAA: the two McCormicks and Drury, who were born in Canada but had acquired US citizenship, and US-born goalie Ray Bonney. Joe McCormick was appointed the US team's captain. PAA manager Schooley, who assembled the Olympic team, said that the PAA's Manners, McCrimmon, and Ed Nagle, all Canadians, would have been worthy of inclusion had they been eligible. The Americans won the silver medal, having overwhelmed all of their opponents except for Canada's gold medalist Winnipeg Falcons, to whom they lost 2–0.

=== Entry into USAHA ===
In late October, 1920, the United States Amateur Hockey Association was formed, with Schooley and William S. Haddock serving as co-founders and respectively acting as the league's secretary-treasurer and president. The team that had been playing under the PAA banner reorganized as the Pittsburgh Hockey Club, shedding the red and gray colors of the PAA for new uniforms of black and gold. An original member of the USAHA, the team played only a few exhibition games in its inaugural season before suspending operations because of eligibility problems. It was reapproved for league play for the following season. The team would not become known as the Yellow Jackets until the 1922–23 season.

=== "Pittsburgh's Canadians" ===
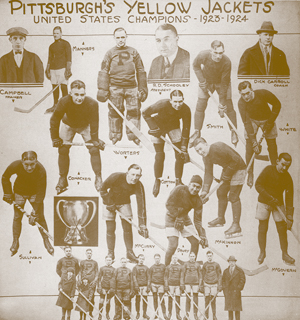
The Pittsburgh Yellow Jackets won the USAHA title in 1923–24

According to former sports reporter Paul Sullivan, who covered hockey for much of his life for the Pittsburgh Gazette Times and later the Pittsburgh Sun-Telegraph, the USAHA was not a completely amateur league. Sullivan noted that even though the USAHA was called an amateur league, "They didn't come down from Canada because they thought Pittsburgh was a nice place." The eastern teams of USAHA soon imported Canadian players, to add to their rosters of local players. In February 1923, Schooley invited Lionel Conacher, a future Hall of Famer, to come to Pittsburgh and officiate games, "to see if the crowd would take to him". Schooley then asked Conacher to play with the Pittsburgh Yellow Jackets in a four-game series against his former team, the Toronto Aura Lee hockey team, and against the Hamilton Tigers. Conacher impressed the Pittsburgh fans by scoring 11 of the Yellow Jackets' 23 goals in the four games. Schooley then used his connections in the Pittsburgh media to promote Conacher to the city's hockey fans. After seeing how well the fans took to Conacher, Schooley made him the team's captain, and asked him to invite a number of his friends to play for the Yellow Jackets. These players included Harold Cotton, Hib Milks, Harold Darragh, Rodger Smith, Duke McCurry, "Tex" White and goalie Roy Worters.

Dick Carroll, who had coached the Toronto Arenas to the Stanley Cup in 1918, was appointed the team's coach once Conacher and his teammates arrived in Pittsburgh for the 1923–24 season by Schooley. However the use of Canadian players drew criticism, with the Boston-based teams leading the charge. In one instance, the Boston Herald questioned why: "Boston hockey … [was] hooked up with Pittsburgh at all… [After all] the best hockey in Boston is played by our own boys … [and Pittsburgh hockey] … is played mainly by a bunch of traveling mercenaries, who practically all are of Canadian birth and training." Boston Herald columnist W.E. Mullins referred to the Yellow Jackets as "Pittsburgh's Canadians". These imported players joined current Yellow Jackets players Dinny Manners and Herb Drury, the latter of whom was about to win his second silver medal as a member of the U.S. Olympic hockey team.

=== USAHA championship era: 1923–1925 ===
In the Yellow Jackets' 1923–24 season opening game at Duquesne Garden, Conacher scored a hat trick. The Yellow Jackets posted a 15–5–0 record for the season to earn first place in the league's Western group. Pittsburgh then defeated the Boston Athletic Association to win the Fellowes Cup 4 games to 1 in the playoffs. A Boston newspaper, the Boston Traveller, on January 29, 1924, termed the Yellow Jackets "a wonder team" and another account referred to Conacher as "Canada’s Wonder Athlete". The trio of Rodger Smith, Conacher and Roy Worters was part of Pittsburgh’s "stonewall defense." The Yellow Jackets were so dominant by 1924 that they spun off another Pittsburgh team, named the Fort Pitt Hornets, who played in the Eastern Division. Dinny Manners, who served as player-coach of the Yellow Jackets in the 1922–23 season, when they were only a .500 club, still played for the team during the 1923–24 season, however the following season he joined the Hornets.

In their 1924–25 season, the Yellow Jackets finished their split regular season with a 15–3–2 first-half record for first place in the Western Group, followed by a 10–8–2 second-half record for second place in the west. After sweeping the second-half winner Eveleth Arrowheads in the group playoff, the Jackets moved on to the league finals against their in-city rivals the Fort Pitt Hornets, who had won the Eastern Group. The favored Yellow Jackets defeated the Hornets three games to none, with one tie, to retain the Fellowes Cup.

=== The Pittsburgh Pirates and the NHL ===
The Yellow Jackets stopped playing after the USAHA folded at the end of the 1924–25 season. When Duquesne Garden president Henry Townsend was granted an NHL expansion team for the following season, he filled it with the former Yellow Jackets players. The NHL team took the name Pittsburgh Pirates from the baseball club, something the new NFL team would also do eight years later. The team wore black and yellow uniforms that largely resembled the Yellow Jackets' outfits from the previous season. The Pirates made it to the NHL semifinals within a year and would be barely nudged out of the playoffs. In 1926, the playoff series was just two games long, with total goals deciding the issue. The Pirates, who finished third in the seven-team NHL, lost to the Montreal Maroons, 3–1, in the opener in Pittsburgh and tied, 3–3, in Montreal. The Maroons' 6–4 edge in goals gave them the series and they went on to win the 1926 Stanley Cup. Among the Jackets-turned-Pirates were two Hockey Hall of Famers—Lionel Conacher and goalie Roy Worters. The Pirates would operate from 1925 until 1930.

=== Uniforms ===
The Pittsburgh Hockey Club that succeeded the Pittsburgh Athletic Association hockey team in 1920 wore black jerseys with gold trim and the word "Pittsburg" (as the name of the city was still sometimes spelled) written in script diagonally across the chest. Black and gold had also been worn by the club's original predecessor, the 1916 Duquesne Garden team.

In November 1922, the Pittsburgh club switched to gold jerseys with a black "P" on the front; the nickname "Yellow Jackets" appeared in the press by the next month. On the sleeves were patches in the form of the coat of arms of the city of Pittsburgh. A late version of the Yellow Jackets jersey featured a slanted and more angular "P" logo on the front and the word "Champions" cursively written above the "P". When the Yellow Jackets became the city's first NHL team, the Pittsburgh Pirates, they retained the colors, chest logo, and sleeve patches from the previous season's uniforms but changed the word above the "P" to read "Pirates".

The team's colors gained new relevance decades later when the city's second NHL team, the Pittsburgh Penguins, wanted to change their uniform colors from blue and white to black and gold. When the change was protested by the Boston Bruins, the Penguins showcased the Pirates-Yellow Jackets jerseys as precedence for the move.

=== Season-by-season record (USAHA) ===
Note: GP = Games played, W = Wins, L = Losses, T = Ties, Pts = Points, GF = Goals for, GA = Goals against

Season	GP	W	L	T	Pts	GF	GA	Finish	Playoffs
1921–22	12	5	7	0	10	–	–	third in Group 2	Missed Playoffs
1922–23	20	10	10	0	20	49	35	fourth in West	Missed Playoffs
1923–24	20	15	5	0	30	63	25	first in West	Won USAHA Championship over Boston Athletic Association 4–1
1924–25	40	25	11	4	54	78	39	first in West	Won USAHA Championship over Fort Pitt Hornets 3–0–1

== Pittsburgh Yellow Jackets II ==
Pittsburgh Yellow Jackets
- City: Pittsburgh, Pennsylvania, United States
- League: International Hockey League
- Founded: 1930
- Operated: 1930–1932
- Home arena: Duquesne Garden
- Colors: Gold, black
- Owner: Roy Schooley
- Head coach: Charlie Reid

Championships
- Playoff championships: 0

The Pirates left Pittsburgh and became the short-lived Philadelphia Quakers in 1930, due to issues related to the Great Depression and the failure to find a replacement for the aging Duquesne Garden. Shortly afterwards, Schooley headed a group that acquired the Niagara Falls franchise in the International Hockey League and transferred it to Pittsburgh under the reclaimed name "Yellow Jackets". The Pittsburgh team competed in the IHL for only two seasons.

In 1932, the Yellow Jackets served as a farm team for the Chicago Black Hawks who often took several of their key players in mid-season. Before a March 1932 game against the Buffalo Bisons, Pittsburgh's Doc Romnes was recalled to Chicago to aid the team in their NHL title chase. This and other roster moves over the season left the Yellow Jackets' coach, Charlie Reid to constantly change his forward lines.

By 1932, the Yellow Jackets were having financial problems, despite the support Pittsburgh fans gave them, leaving some doubt as to whether the team would operate in 1932–33. On August 22, 1932, it was reported that the defunct Pittsburgh Pirates would be returning to the NHL for the upcoming season. The news put the Yellow Jackets in limbo, since the Pirates still held territorial rights and could deny the team permission to operate. However the trust company that owned the Jackets had the right to deny the NHL team the right to play at Duquesne Garden. However the optimism was short-lived and on October 1, 1932 the Pirates formally suspended operations. The Yellow Jackets went dormant as well, and ultimately disbanded without playing another season.

=== Season-by-season record ===
Note: GP = Games played, W = Wins, L = Losses, T = Ties, Pts = Points, GF = Goals for, GA = Goals against

Season	GP	W	L	T	Pts	GF	GA	Finish	Playoffs
1930–31	48	21	18	9	51	101	108	fourth in IHL	fourth in round robin
1931–32	48	17	22	9	43	91	118	fifth in IHL	Missed Playoffs

== Pittsburgh Yellow Jackets III ==
Pittsburgh Yellow Jackets
- City: Pittsburgh, Pennsylvania, United States
- League: Independent (early 1935); Eastern Amateur Hockey League (1935–1937)
- Founded: 1935
- Operated: 1935–1937
- Home arena: Duquesne Garden
- Colors: Gold, black
- Owner: John H. Harris
- Head coach: Dinny Manners

Championships
- Playoff championships: 0

The Yellow Jackets relied on several unknown amateur players, including Carl Lehto and Jack Tuten, in early 1935.

The Yellow Jackets in February 1935

Yellow Jackets players Gus Giesebrecht, left, and Byron McDonald at Duquesne Garden in 1937.

In January 1935, Pittsburgh theater chain owner John H. Harris, who had taken a lease on the Garden in 1932, hired coach and former player Dinny Manners to put together an amateur team with the intent of placing it in the Eastern Amateur Hockey League. This was the third hockey team in Pittsburgh to take the name Yellow Jackets, not including yet another team of the same name in a local commercial league.

The team spent its shortened first season in early 1935 as an independent playing various exhibition games against other clubs. Then on October 29, 1935, the Montreal Gazette reported that the Yellow Jackets had joined the EAHL with the New York Rovers. During the team's three seasons of play, Frank Brimsek served as the team's goaltender. Brimsek would go on to win 252 games in goal, which gave him the record for winningest American-born netminder. His record would stand until February 15, 1994, when Tom Barrasso and the NHL's Pittsburgh Penguins defeated the Winnipeg Jets, 5-3, at the Pittsburgh Civic Arena.

The Yellow Jackets had a hand in providing Pittsburgh with another professional hockey team, the Pittsburgh Shamrocks. The idea for the Shamrocks team came about when Yellow Jackets' owner, John Harris, and Charles King, president of the International American Hockey League, met in Pittsburgh to discuss Pittsburgh’s possible entrance into the league in the fall. The meeting resulted in the establishment of the Shamrocks and established that the Garden's ice time would be split by the new IHL team and the Yellow Jackets, who became the newest members of the Eastern Amateur Hockey League. During his tenure as owner of the Yellow Jackets, John Harris made two notable decisions. First, on March 31, 1936, he hired Sonja Henie, 24-year-old Norwegian figure skater to perform before a Yellow Jackets’ game, leading to the creation of the Ice Capades. Then, on October 4, 1936, Harris purchased the Detroit Olympics and moved the team to Pittsburgh, where they were renamed the Pittsburgh Hornets. Some players from the Yellow Jackets and Shamrocks players then joined the Hornets. After the 1936–37 season, the Yellow Jackets folded.

Two players from the team have been inducted into the Hockey Hall of Fame: Brimsek in 1966 and winger Gordie Drillon in 1975.

=== Season-by-season record (EAHL) ===
Note: GP = Games played, W = Wins, L = Losses, T = Ties, Pts = Points, GF = Goals for, GA = Goals against

Season	GP	W	L	T	Pts	GF	GA	Finish	Playoffs
1935–36	40	22	16	2	46	108	74	second in EHL	second in round robin
1936–37	48	19	24	5	43	119	147	third in EHL	Missed Playoffs

== See also ==
- List of Pittsburgh Yellow Jackets players
- Pittsburgh Pirates (NHL)
