= Henri Couttet =

French ice hockey player

- Born: 8 June 1901; Chamonix, France
- Died: 11 October 1953 (aged 52)
- Position: Defence
- National team: France
- Playing career: 1919–1926

Henri Michel Couttet (8 June 1901 – 11 October 1953) was a French ice hockey player. He competed in the men's tournament at the 1920 Summer Olympics.
