= Georges Dary =

French ice hockey player

- Born: 6 December 1889; Paris, France
- Died: 18 April 1945 (aged 55); Magné, France
- Position: Right wing
- National team: France
- Playing career: 1919–1922

Jean Robert Georges Marie Dary (6 December 1889 – 18 April 1945) was a French ice hockey player. He competed in the men's tournament at the 1920 Summer Olympics.
