= Palais de Glace d'Anvers =

Indoor arena in Antwerp, Belgium

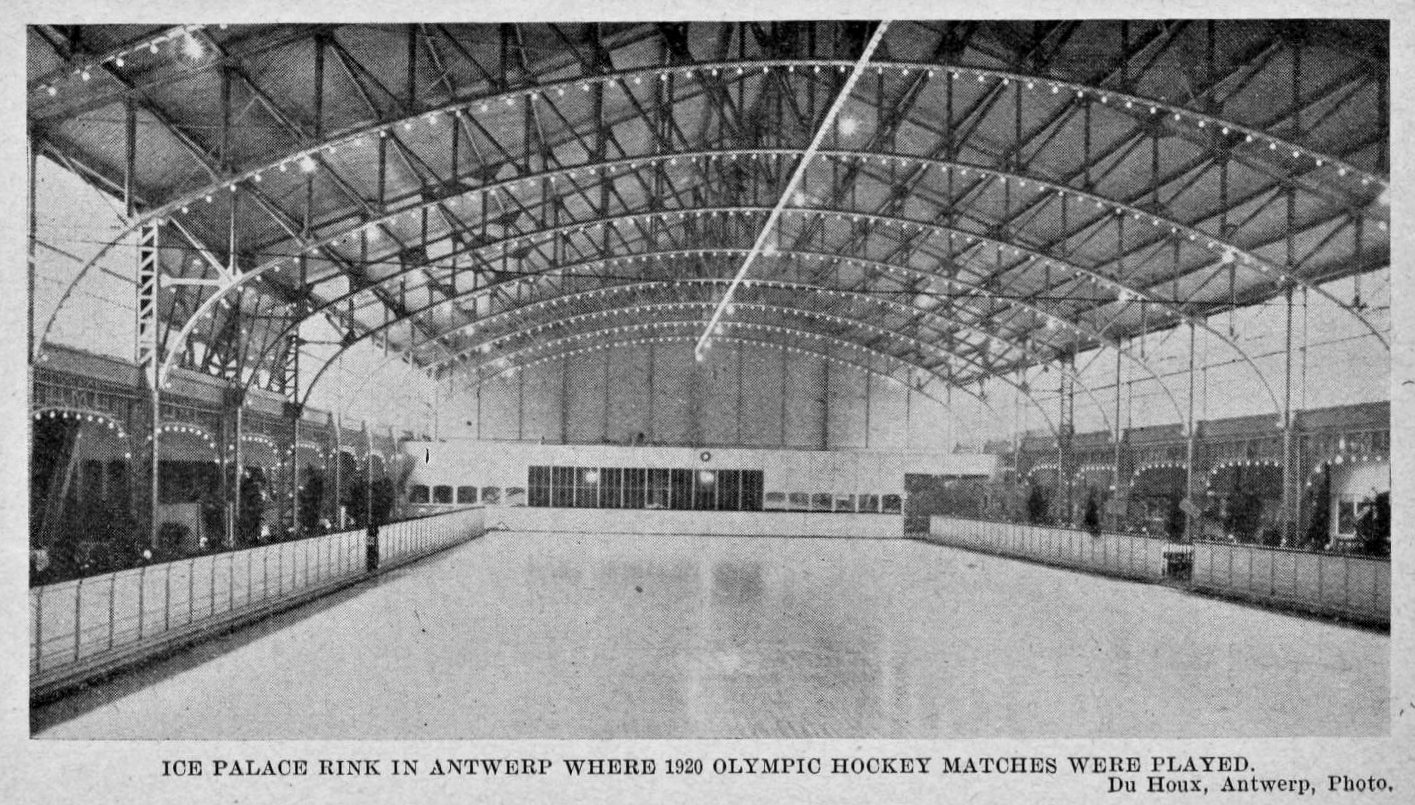
Palais de Glace d'Anvers.

The Palais de Glace d'Anvers (IJspaleis Antwerpen) was a sports venue located in Antwerp, Belgium. Measuring 168 feet (51 m) long by 58.5 feet (17.8 m) wide, it hosted both the figure skating and ice hockey events for the 1920 Summer Olympics. The building was demolished in 2016.

Later the building was converted for commercial purposes. It served, among other things, as a Renault garage, as a storage place for the vehicles of the Antwerp Taxi Maatschappij and as a parking garage under the name Garage Leopold. In 2016, the building was demolished for the construction of new apartment buildings. With it, one of the last physical relics of the 1920 Olympics disappeared.
