= Jean-Maurice Goossens =

Belgian ice hockey player

- Born: 16 January 1892 Seraing, Liège, Belgium
- Died: 6 July 1965 (aged 73) Antwerp, Belgium
- Position: Left wing
- Played for: CPB, Bruxelles
- National team: Belgium
- Playing career: 1911–1922
Medal record
Representing Belgium
Ice Hockey European Championships
Gold medal – first place	1913 Munich	Team

Louis Jean Mathieu "Jean-Maurice" Goossens (16 January 1892 – 6 July 1965) was a Belgian ice hockey player. He won the 1913 European title and finished fifth at the 1920 Summer Olympics.
