= Jean Chaland =

French ice hockey player

- Born: 8 September 1881; Saint-Chamond, France
- Died: 23 January 1973 (aged 91); Orange, France
- Position: Defence
- National team: France
- Playing career: 1912–1920

Jean Marie Just Louis Chaland (8 September 1881 – 23 January 1973) was a French ice hockey player. He competed in the men's tournament at the 1920 Summer Olympics.
