= Russell McCrimmon =

Canadian ice hockey player

- Born: March 1, 1890 Lorneville, ON, CAN
- Died: June 24, 1934 (aged 44) Ingram, PA, USA
- Position: Right wing
- Played for: Edmonton Eskimos
- Playing career: 1908–1921

Russell "Silver" McCrimmon (March 1, 1890 – June 24, 1934) was a Canadian professional ice hockey player. He played with the Edmonton Eskimos of the Western Canada Hockey League in the 1921–22 season.

Earlier, as an amateur, he played in Pittsburgh with the Duquesne Garden and Pittsburgh Athletic Association hockey teams.

He died on June 24, 1934, after being taken to jail following an automobile accident. His death was ascribed to suicide by hanging.
