= Valentin Loos =

Czech ice hockey player

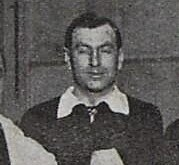
- Loos in 1923
- Born: 13 April 1895 Prague, Bohemia, Austria-Hungary
- Died: 8 September 1942 (aged 47) Prague, Protectorate of Bohemia and Moravia
- Position: Right wing
- National team: Czechoslovakia
- Playing career: 1919–1929
Medal record
Olympic Games
Bronze medal – third place	1920 Antwerp	Team

Valentin Jaroslav "Vilda" Loos (13 April 1895 – 8 September 1942) was a Czech ice hockey player who competed for Czechoslovakia in the 1920 Summer Olympics and in the 1924 Winter Olympics.

He was a member of the Czechoslovak ice hockey team that won the bronze medal in 1920. Four years later he also participated in the first Winter Olympic ice hockey tournament.
