= Erik Burman =

Swedish ice hockey player (1897–1985)

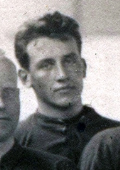
- Burman at the 1920 Olympics.
- Born: 6 December 1897 Stockholm, Sweden
- Died: 31 March 1985 (aged 87) Stockholm, Sweden
- Position: Centre
- National team: Sweden
- Playing career: 1919–1941

Hjalmar Erik Wilheim "Jerka, Burre" Burman (6 December 1897 – 31 March 1985) was a Swedish ice hockey player, footballer, and bandy player. He competed in the 1920 Summer Olympics and in the 1924 Winter Olympics.

In 1920 he was a member of the Swedish ice hockey team which finished fourth in the Summer Olympics tournament. He played five matches and scored four goals. Eric Burman became the first goal scorer for Sweden ever, by scoring against Belgium on 23 April 1920.

In the 1921 European Championship, Burman played for Sweden in the one game they played against Czechoslovakia. He scored three goals to help lead Sweden to a 6–4 win and a Championship title.

Four years later he finished again fourth with the Swedish team in the first Winter Olympics ice hockey tournament.

Burman played both hockey and bandy for IK Göta. After the Olympics 1920 he played in Europe with Berliner SC, 1921 and 1923. He won Swedish hockey championships 1923, 1929 and 1930, and Swedish bandy championships in 1929, together with IK Göta. He was living in Berlin before he moved to Antwerp and played hockey there with CP Antwerp, before he moved to United States and some games with Minneapolis Street Runners.

He later returned to Sweden, and on 26 November 1940 Eric Burman became the oldest player ever in Swedish championships in hockey. In this match he also became the oldest ever scorer in Swedish in the same game. He was then 42 years, 11 months and 20 days, when IK Göta played IK Sture in Svenska Serien, the highest league in Swedish ice hockey between seasons 1935/1936 through 1943/1944.
