= Haldor Halderson =

Icelandic-Canadian ice hockey player (1898–1965)

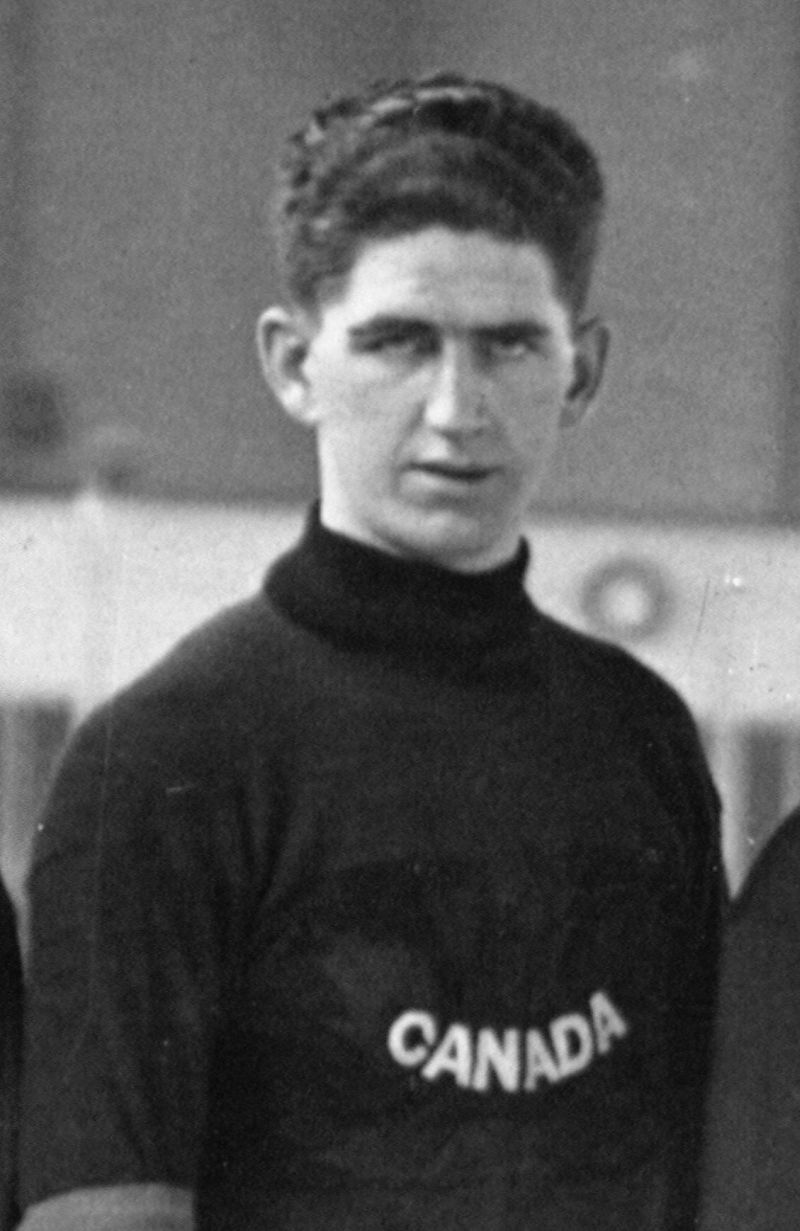
- Haldor Halderson representing Canada at the 1920 Summer Olympics
- Born: January 7, 1898 Winnipeg, Manitoba, Canada
- Died: August 1, 1965 (aged 67) Winnipeg, Manitoba, Canada
- Height: 6 ft 3 in (191 cm)
- Weight: 200 lb (91 kg; 14 st 4 lb)
- Position: Defence/Winger
- Shot: Right
- Played for: Victoria Aristocrats (PCHA); Victoria Cougars (PCHA/WCHL/WHL); Detroit Cougars (NHL); Toronto St. Pats/Maple Leafs (NHL)
- National team: Canada
- Playing career: 1917–1937
Medal record
Olympic Games
| Gold medal – first place | 1920 Antwerp | Team |

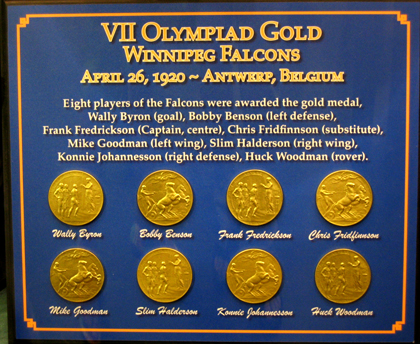
From MTS Centre Hockey Arena display, Winnipeg

Haldor Halderson (Halldór Halldórsson; January 7, 1898 – August 1, 1965) was an Icelandic-Canadian ice hockey player who competed in the 1920 Summer Olympics.

Halderson was the right wing for the Winnipeg Falcons, the Canadian team which won the Olympic gold medal in 1920. Slim then joined the Victoria Aristocrats/Victoria Cougars and helped them win the Stanley Cup in 1925. On both occasions he was a teammate of fellow Icelandic-Canadian ice hockey star Frank Fredrickson, making them the first players to win an Olympic gold medal and a Stanley Cup.

== Playing career ==
Halderson was born as Halldór Halldórsson in Winnipeg, Manitoba, to Icelandic immigrants Halldór Kristinn Halldórsson and Jórunn Kristolína Jónsdóttir.

Halderson never played organized junior or intermediate ice hockey in his hometown of Winnipeg, but sprang into fame overnight when he joined the senior ranks of the Winnipeg Ypres team of the Manitoba Hockey Association's military league in 1917–18. Halderson was nicknamed "Slim" due to his lanky frame during his first years in senior amateur and professional hockey. At the start of the 1921–22 season, Halderson's first in the PCHA with the Victoria Aristocrats, he weighed in at only 166 pounds on a 6 feet 2 inches frame. As his playing career went along he put on more weight.

During the 1920–21 season, Canadian Amateur Hockey Association president H. J. Sterling hired a detective who discovered that Halderson and teammate Robert Benson received C$6,500 to play amateur hockey. The Amateur Athletic Union of Canada voided Halderson's registration card and he was suspended from the 1921 Allan Cup playoffs, although the Saskatchewan Amateur Hockey Association allowed him and his Saskatoon team to continue in the league playoffs.

Halderson scored the first goal in the history of the Detroit Cougars (modern day Detroit Red Wings) franchise on November 20, 1926.

== Statistics ==
=== Regular season and playoffs ===
| | | | Regular season | | | | | Playoffs |
| Season | Team | League | GP | G | A | Pts | PIM | GP | G | A | Pts | PIM |
|---|---|---|---|---|---|---|---|---|---|---|---|---|
| 1917–18 | Winnipeg Ypres | MHL | 7 | 5 | 6 | 11 | 4 | — | — | — | — | — |
| 1917–18 | Winnipeg Ypres | Al-Cup | — | — | — | — | — | 4 | 4 | 3 | 7 | 4 |
| 1918–19 | Winnipeg Monarchs | MHL | 9 | 3 | 5 | 8 | 4 | — | — | — | — | — |
| 1919–20 | Winnipeg Falcons | MHL | 9 | 10 | 11 | 21 | 10 | — | — | — | — | — |
| 1919–20 | Winnipeg Falcons | Al-Cup | — | — | — | — | — | 6 | 4 | 6 | 10 | 6 |
| 1920–21 | Saskatoon Crescents | SSHL | 16 | 12 | 3 | 15 | 38 | 4 | 8 | 0 | 8 | 9 |
| 1921–22 | Victoria Aristocrats | PCHA | 23 | 7 | 3 | 10 | 13 | — | — | — | — | — |
| 1922–23 | Victoria Cougars | PCHA | 29 | 10 | 5 | 15 | 26 | 2 | 0 | 0 | 0 | 0 |
| 1923–24 | Victoria Cougars | PCHA | 30 | 6 | 2 | 8 | 50 | — | — | — | — | — |
| 1924–25 | Victoria Cougars | WCHL | 28 | 3 | 6 | 9 | 71 | 4 | 1 | 0 | 1 | 12 |
| 1924–25 | Victoria Cougars | St-Cup | — | — | — | — | — | 4 | 2 | 1 | 3 | 8 |
| 1925–26 | Victoria Cougars | WHL | 23 | 3 | 1 | 4 | 51 | 3 | 1 | 0 | 1 | 10 |
| 1925–26 | Victoria Cougars | St-Cup | — | — | — | — | — | 4 | 1 | 0 | 1 | 8 |
| 1926–27 | Detroit Cougars | NHL | 19 | 2 | 0 | 2 | 29 | — | — | — | — | — |
| 1926–27 | Toronto St. Pats/Maple Leafs | NHL | 25 | 1 | 2 | 3 | 36 | — | — | — | — | — |
| 1927–28 | Quebec Castors | Can-Am | 40 | 13 | 5 | 18 | 71 | 6 | 1 | 1 | 2 | 14 |
| 1928–29 | Newark Bulldogs | Can-Am | 40 | 6 | 3 | 9 | 107 | — | — | — | — | — |
| 1929–30 | Kansas City Pla-Mors | AHA | 48 | 8 | 7 | 15 | 76 | 5 | 0 | 0 | 0 | 8 |
| 1930–31 | Kansas City Pla-Mors | AHA | 47 | 5 | 7 | 12 | 77 | 8 | 1 | 1 | 2 | 10 |
| 1931–32 | Kansas City Pla-Mors | AHA | 46 | 9 | 3 | 12 | 69 | 4 | 2 | 0 | 2 | 0 |
| 1932–33 | Kansas City Pla-Mors | AHA | 26 | 1 | 4 | 5 | 30 | — | — | — | — | — |
| 1932–33 | Duluth Hornets / Wichita Blue Jays | AHA | 24 | 7 | 2 | 9 | 40 | — | — | — | — | — |
| 1933–34 | Tulsa Oilers | AHA | 48 | 9 | 12 | 21 | 66 | 4 | 0 | 2 | 2 | 4 |
| 1934–35 | Tulsa Oilers | AHA | 48 | 6 | 13 | 19 | 65 | 5 | 1 | 2 | 3 | 2 |
| 1935–36 | Tulsa Oilers | AHA | 48 | 6 | 14 | 20 | 25 | 3 | 0 | 0 | 0 | 4 |
| 1936–37 | Wichita Skyhawks | AHA | 48 | 5 | 4 | 9 | 30 | — | — | — | — | — |
| AHA totals | | | 383 | 56 | 66 | 122 | 478 | 29 | 4 | 5 | 9 | 28 |
| PCHA/WCHL totals | | | 133 | 29 | 17 | 46 | 211 | 9 | 2 | 0 | 2 | 31 |
| NHL totals | | | 44 | 3 | 2 | 5 | 65 | — | — | — | — | — |

=== International ===
| Year | Team | Event | GP | G | A | Pts | PIM |
|---|---|---|---|---|---|---|---|
| 1920 | Canada | OLY | 3 | 9 | 0 | 9 | — |
| Senior totals | | | 3 | 9 | 0 | 9 | — |

== Awards and achievements ==
- Allan Cup Championship – 1920
- Olympic Gold Metalist – 1920
- PCHA First All-Star Team – 1923
- PCHA Second All-Star Team – 1922
- Stanley Cup Championship – 1925
- AHA First All-Star Team – 1930, 1936, and 1937
- Member of the Manitoba Hockey Hall of Fame
