= François Vergult =

Belgian ice hockey player

- Born: April 21, 1891 Brussels, Belgium
- Position: Goaltender
- Played for: CPB, Bruxelles
- National team: Belgium
- Playing career: 1910–1923
Medal record
Representing Belgium
Ice Hockey European Championships
Gold medal – first place	1913 Munich	Team
Bronze medal – third place	1914 Berlin	Team

François Vergult (born 21 April 1891, date of death unknown) was a Belgian ice hockey player. He won the 1913 European title, and finished third at the 1914 European Championships and fifth at the 1920 Summer Olympics.
