= Jan Palouš =

Czechoslovak ice hockey player

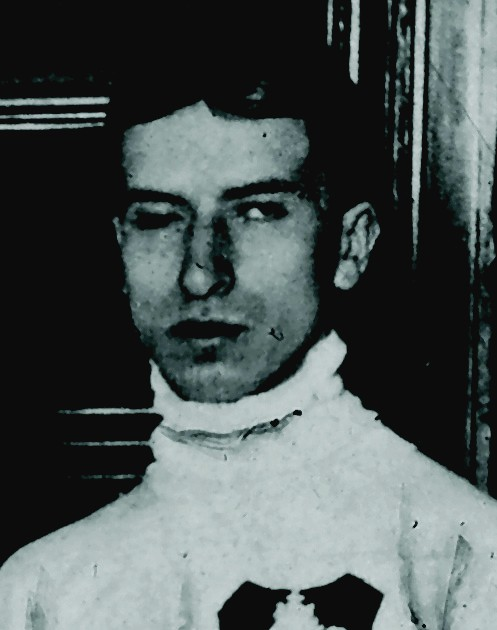
- Palouš, sometime before 1918
- Born: 25 October 1888 Budweis, Austria-Hungary
- Died: 25 September 1971 (aged 82) Prague, Czechoslovakia
- Position: Defence
- Shot: Left
- Played for: CSS Prague; HC Slavia Praha
- National team: Czechoslovakia
- Playing career: 1908–1925
Medal record
Olympic Games
Bronze medal – third place	1920 Antwerp	Team

Jan Leopold Alois "Koza" Palouš (25 October 1888 – 25 September 1971) was a Czechoslovak ice hockey player who competed in the 1920 Summer Olympics and in the 1924 Winter Olympics. He was born in Budweis, Kingdom of Bohemia, Austria-Hungary and died in Prague, Czechoslovakia.

He was a member of the German ice hockey team which won the bronze medal in 1920. Four years later he also participated in the first Winter Olympic ice hockey tournament.
