= René Savoie =

Swiss ice hockey player

- Born: February 9, 1896 Le Locle, Switzerland
- Died: April 29, 1961 (aged 65) Neuchâtel, Switzerland
- Position: Goaltender
- National team: Switzerland
- Playing career: 1919–1924

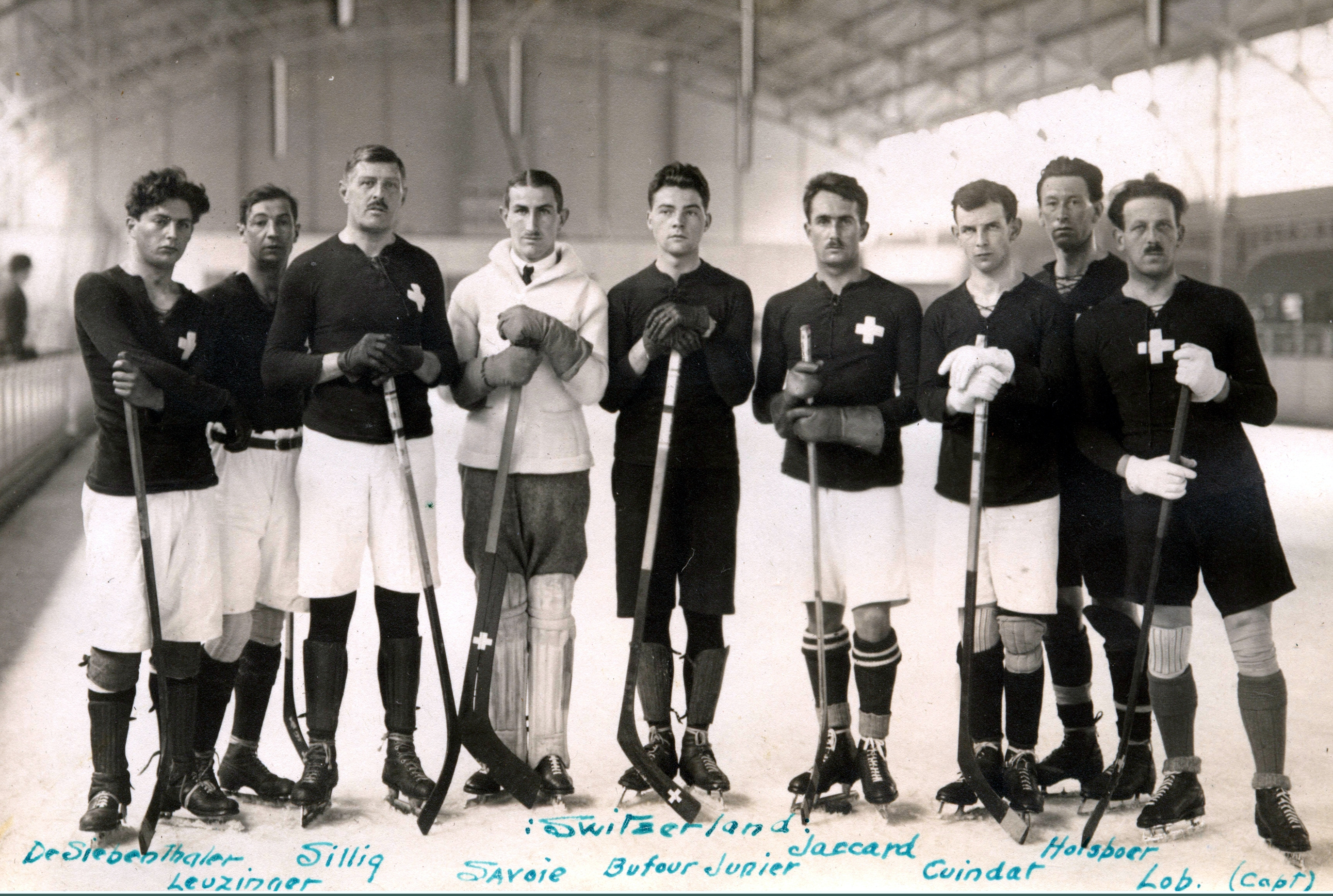

René Savoie (9 February 1896 – 29 April 1961) was a Swiss ice hockey goaltender who competed in the 1920 Summer Olympics and the 1924 Winter Olympics. In 1920, he participated with the Swiss ice hockey team in the Summer Olympic tournament, where he gained attention for his unique attire on the ice, consisting of a cardigan, shirt, and tie. Four years later, he was once again a member of the Swiss team in the first Winter Olympics tournament.

== See also ==
- List of Olympic men's ice hockey players for Switzerland
