= David Säfwenberg =

Swedish ice hockey player

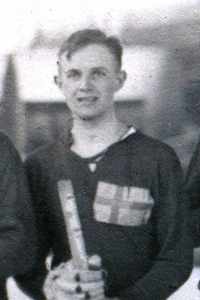
- Säfwenberg at the 1920 Olympics.
- Born: 1 October 1896 Uppsala, Sweden
- Died: 31 July 1957 (aged 60) Carpinteria, California, U.S.
- Position: Centre
- National team: Sweden
- Playing career: 1919–1920

Carl David Säfwenberg (1 October 1896 – 31 July 1957) was a Swedish ice hockey player who competed in the 1920 Summer Olympics. In 1920 he was a member of the Swedish ice hockey team which finished fourth in the Summer Olympics tournament. He played one match and scored one goal. David Säfwenberg was brother of Sven Säfwenberg.
