= Jacques Gaittet =

French ice hockey player

- Born: August 15, 1889; Paris, France
- Died: February 7, 1936 (aged 46); Paris, France
- Position: Goaltender
- National team: France
- Playing career: 1912–1922

Jules Fernand "Jacques" Gaittet (b. August 15, 1889 - d. February 7, 1936) was a French ice hockey player. He competed in the men's tournament at the 1920 Summer Olympics.
