= Konrad Johannesson =

Canadian ice hockey defenceman

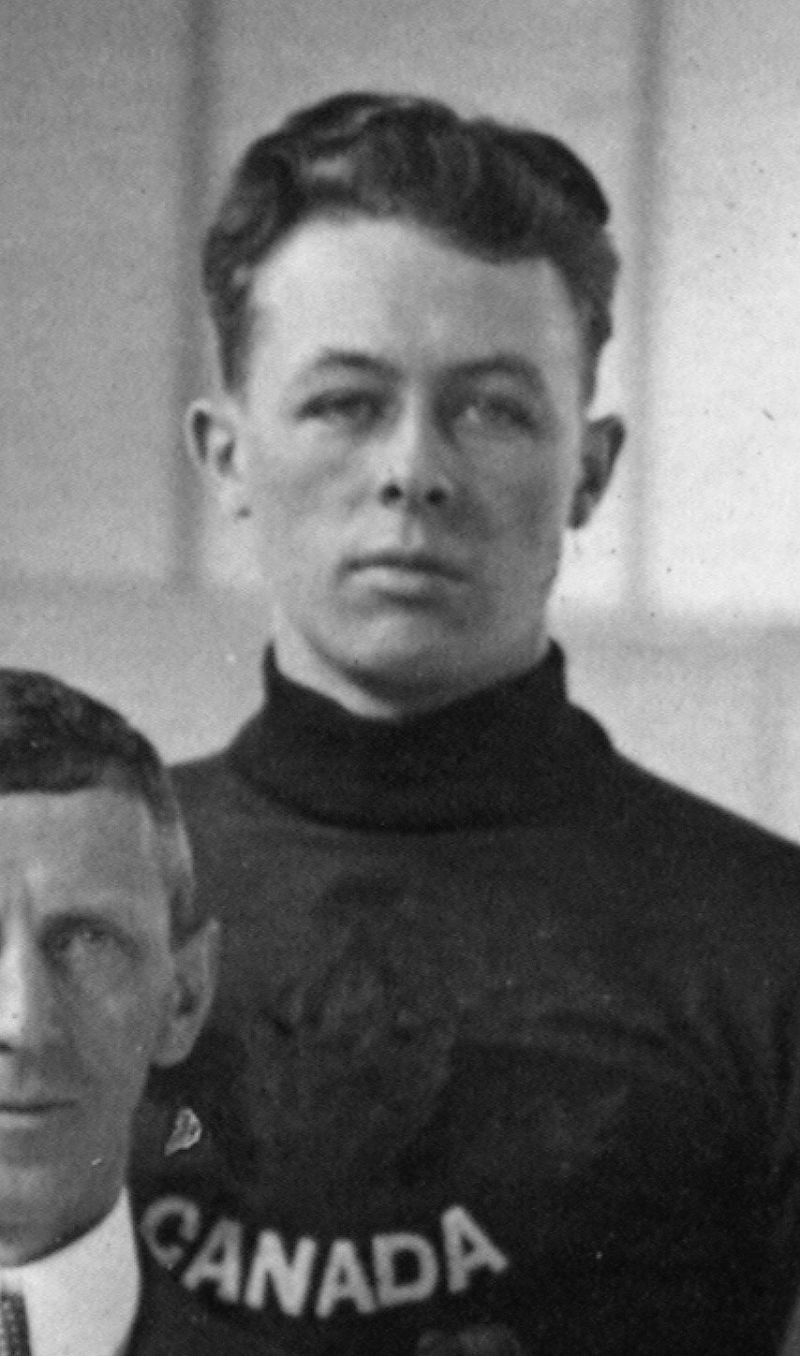
- Johannesson at the 1920 Olympics
- Born: Konrad Jonasson Johannesson; August 10, 1896; Glenboro, Manitoba, Canada
- Died: October 25, 1968 (aged 72); Winnipeg, Manitoba, Canada
- Resting place: Brookside Cemetery
- Other name: "Konnie"
- Occupations: Airport manager; Flight instructor
- Years active: 1919–1965
- Known for: Aviator
- Spouse: Freda Johannesson
- Children: 4

Konrad Johannesson
- Height: 6 ft 2 in (188 cm)
- Weight: 175 lb (79 kg; 12 st 7 lb)
- Position: Defence
- Played for: Winnipeg Falcons; Selkirk Fishermen; Winnipeg Maroons; St. Paul Saints; Moose Jaw Warriors; Regina Capitals; Seattle Eskimos
- National team: Canada
- Playing career: 1915–1929
Medal record
Olympic Games
Gold medal – first place	1920 Antwerp	Team

Konrad Jonasson "Konnie" Johannesson (August 10, 1896 – October 25, 1968) was an Icelandic-Canadian aviator and ice hockey player who competed in the 1920 Summer Olympics. As a pioneering aviator, he was instrumental in flight training as well as airport administration.

== Early years ==
Konnie Johannesson was born in Glenboro, Manitoba, son of Icelandic immigrants Jónas Jóhannesson and Rósa Einarsdóttir. In 1897, the family moved to Winnipeg, where he attended Somerset and Kelvin schools. Along with other players of Icelandic descent, Johannesson began playing hockey with the Winnipeg Falcons in 1913.

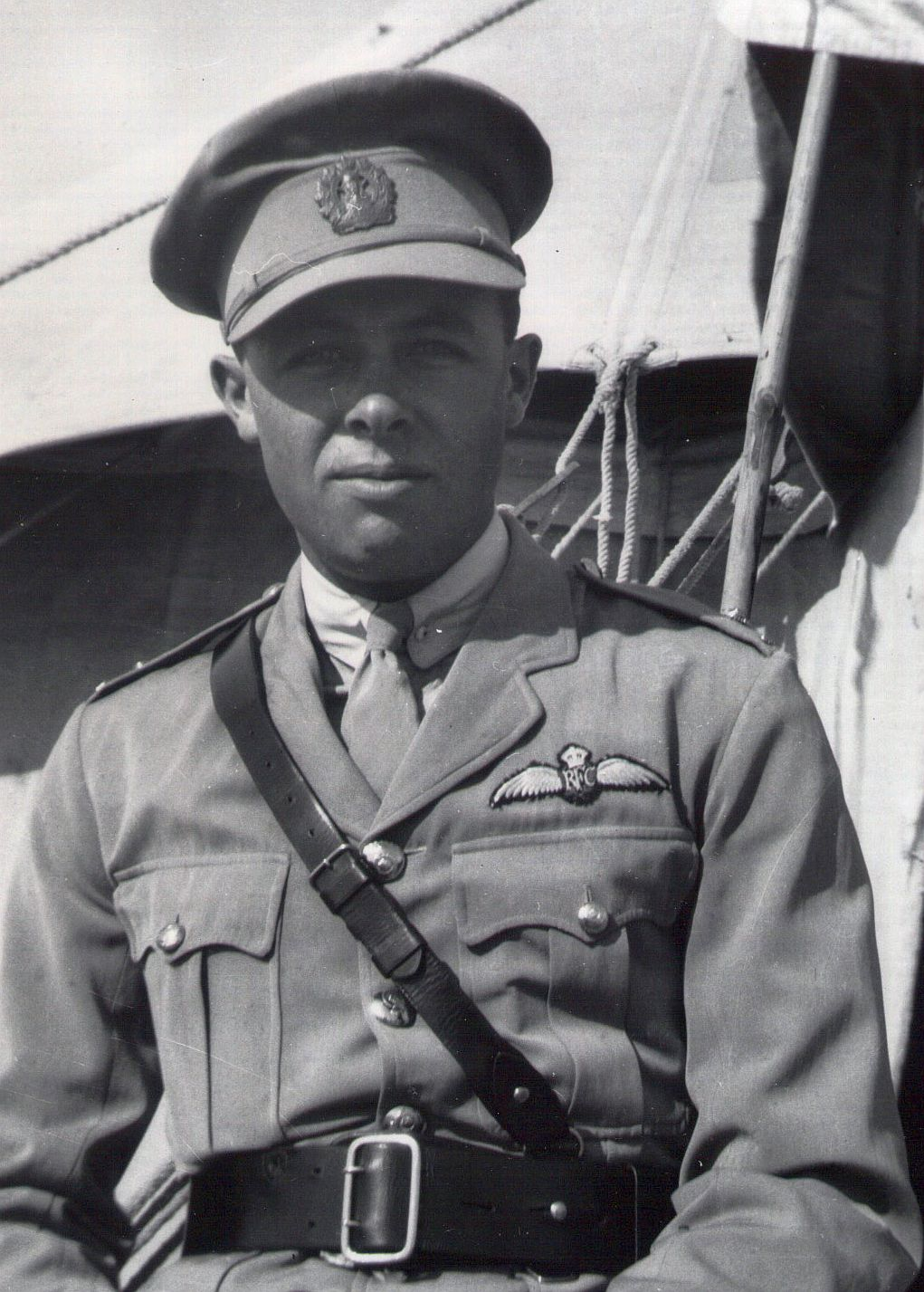
2nd Lieutenant Johannesson, c. 1918

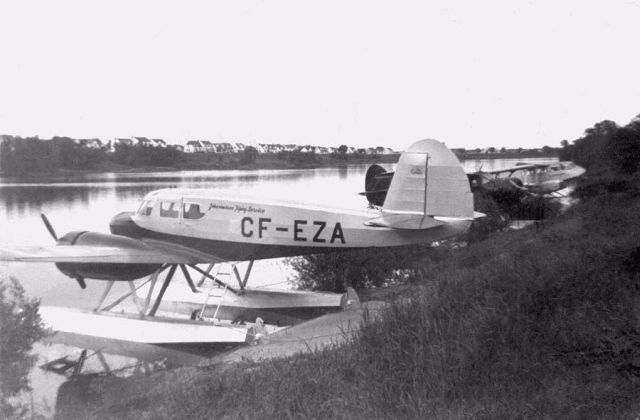
Johannesson Flying Service Cessna Crane at Brandon Avenue Seaplane Base in Winnipeg, c. 1946, with a Noorduyn Norseman and a De Havilland Dragonfly tied up along the shore.

== First World War ==
Johannesson enlisted in the 223rd Overseas (XI Reserve) Battalion of the 2nd Brigade of the Canadian Army on March 8, 1916, in Winnipeg. From then until April 1917, he trained at Camp Hughes near Carberry, Manitoba. In April 1917 Johannesson went overseas to England. Transferring to the Royal Flying Corps in September 1917, Johannesson began pilot training. He became a flight instructor at the RFC airfield at El Khanka, Egypt. During the war, the Royal Flying Corps saw an urgent requirement for aviation training, primarily for pilots, and set up an extensive training system in Egypt. Initially, its trainees were from England, but as the home training facilities began keeping pace with demand, the Egyptian schools took in more local cadets, as well as some from South Africa.

Johannesson trained pilots until December 1918, returning to Canada in May 1919. After his discharge from the military, he became a student at the University of Manitoba and rejoined the Winnipeg Falcons hockey team.

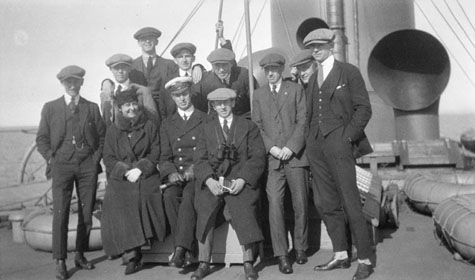
Photograph of the Gold Medal-winning Winnipeg Falcons taken en route to the 1920 Olympics (photograph includes an unidentified ships' officer and a female passenger)

== Hockey ==
In 1920, Johannesson, playing right defence for the Winnipeg Falcons, was described as a gifted "stick handler", dangerous rusher, known for his "terrific" shot, and was considered one of the "giants of the team". After winning the Allan Cup Championship (1920), the Winnipeg Falcons won the right to represent Canada at the Olympic championship games played at Antwerp, Belgium, from April 23–April 29, 1920.

During the nine-day ocean voyage to Antwerp, aboard the R.M.S. Melita, Johannesson and teammate Frank Fredrickson joined with another passenger to form a musical trio, "The Falcon Trio" that held concerts aboard the ship. (Note: Both Johannesson and Fredrickson played violins while a passenger from Vancouver joined them on a piano.) After decisive victories over the United States, Czechoslovakia and Sweden, with Johannesson as one of the scorers, the Winnipeg Falcons won Canada’s first Olympic hockey gold medal. (Note: The Falcons outscored their opponents 29–1.)

From then until his 1929 retirement, Johannesson played with several different teams across multiple leagues, never achieving the same success he enjoyed during his earlier days. He played throughout Canada and parts of the United States, playing for the Winnipeg Maroons of the Central Hockey League, the Moose Jaw Warriors and Regina Capitals of the Pro Hockey League, and St. Paul and Winnipeg teams for the American Hockey Association. Although Johannesson had left as a player in 1924, he did spend one season (1933–1934) as the head coach of the Winnipeg Falcons.

== Aviation ==
After his return to Canada, Johannesson worked as a flying instructor and later, as airport manager. In 1927, Winnipeg hired him as the city’s first Airport Manager. Under his supervision, following the construction of large hangar facilities by Canadian Airways Limited in 1931, Winnipeg’s Stevenson Field grew from a small airstrip to one of western Canada’s busiest air centres.

From 1929 to 1932, Johannesson was a charter member, chief flying instructor and manager at the Winnipeg Flying Club. One of his pupils was John A. Kent, a future Battle of Britain fighter pilot and test pilot. Another of his students was frontiersman Tom Lamb, who had purchased a Stinson Reliant as well as flying lessons from Johannesson who was the Stinson Aircraft dealer for western Canada. Lamb was later to form Lamb Air, the first northern Manitoba-based air carrier. During his tenure, Johannesson earned the highest flight trainer rating in Canada, one of only six instructors with that rating.

From 1932, in operating the Johannesson Flying Service, he was based in Winnipeg at both the Brandon Avenue Aerodrome and Stevenson Aerodrome. His operation transported approximately 150 passengers each year into central Manitoba with his two-seater de Havilland Cirrus Moth biplane, as well as offering flight instruction.

=== Second World War ===
During the Second World War, Johannesson entered politics, seeking election unsuccessfully as a Liberal candidate in the 1942 Winnipeg North by-election. (Note: The by-election was won by Stanley Knowles (NDP).) His main wartime activities centred on training pilots. While operating the Johannesson Flying Service, he taught Icelandic students to fly so they could then enlist in the RCAF. By war's end, when Johannesson wound up his career as a flight instructor, he had taught 231 pilots to fly.

=== Postwar ===
After the war, Johannesson established a flying service at Flin Flon, Manitoba. In 1947, he purchased a half-mile strip of land along the Red River in the Rural Municipality of West St. Paul with the intention of building an airstrip and floatplane facility. In 1951, Johannesson moved his Winnipeg operation to Rivercrest Airstrip and Seaplane Base at Middlechurch, north of Winnipeg.

=== The Johannesson ruling ===
In 1952, after municipal and provincial judgments against Johannesson in the courts denying the approval for an airport at Rivercrest, he was successful in taking the case to the Supreme Court of Canada. At the conclusion of a three-year legal battle, the ruling from Johannesson v. the Municipality of West St. Paul established that federal jurisdiction applied to all matters pertaining to aviation. This ruling is still a landmark case in Canadian aviation.

Johannesson operated Rivercrest until his retirement in 1967.

== Awards and honours ==
In 2014, along with other members of the Winnipeg Falcons, Johannesson was honoured in a new Heritage Minute segment. The segment recounts how the Falcons overcame discrimination and stayed together through the First World War on their way to the top of the hockey world. The Falcons segment premiered at the MTS Centre in Winnipeg on November 6, 2014, during the intermission of a game between the Winnipeg Jets and Pittsburgh Penguins.

The Hockey Hall of Fame in Toronto, Manitoba Hockey Hall of Fame and Manitoba Sports Hall of Fame and Museum have permanent displays honouring the Falcons and their Olympic victory.

Hockey Canada, in recognition of the Falcons' achievement, had the national junior team wear replicas of the famous old gold and black Falcons uniforms for a World Junior Championship pre-tournament game in Winnipeg on December 20, 2004.

In recognition of his community service, Johannesson was given a Golden Boy Award in 1965. He died at Winnipeg on October 25, 1968, and was buried in Brookside Cemetery in the military section.
