= Allan Woodman =

Canadian ice hockey player

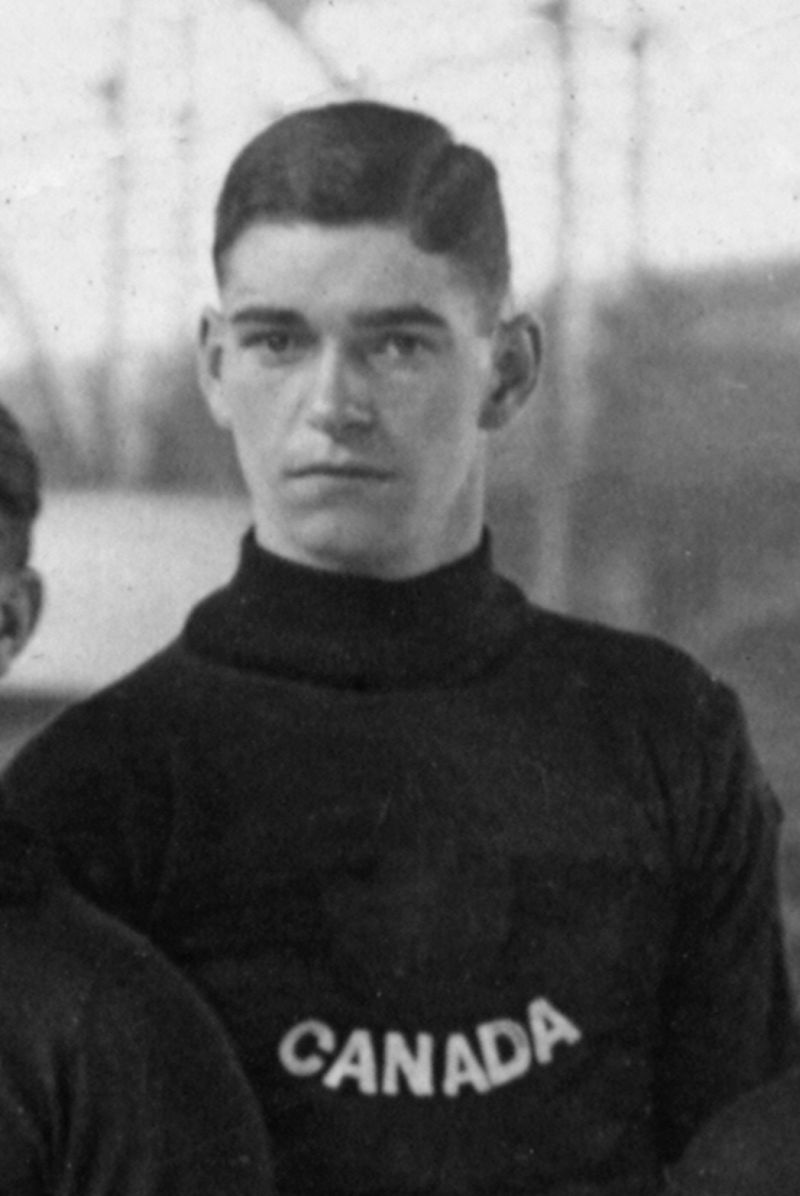
- Woodman at the 1920 Olympics.
- Born: March 11, 1899 Winnipeg, Manitoba, Canada
- Died: April 17, 1963 (aged 64) Winnipeg, Manitoba, Canada
- Height: 5 ft 11 in (180 cm)
- Weight: 165 lb (75 kg; 11 st 11 lb)
- Position: Rover
- Shot: Left
- Played for: Canadian-Ukrainian Athletic Club; Winnipeg Falcons; Selkirk Fishermen
- National team: Canada
- Playing career: 1917–1925
Medal record
Olympic Games
Gold medal – first place	1920 Antwerp	Team

Allan Charles "Huck" Woodman (March 11, 1899 – April 17, 1963) was a Canadian ice hockey player who competed in the 1920 Summer Olympics. He was born in Winnipeg, Manitoba.

He was a member for the Winnipeg Falcons, the Canadian team which won the gold medal in the 1920 Olympics. Woodman was the only player on the team not of Icelandic descent. He died in Winnipeg, Manitoba.

== Awards and achievements ==
- Allan Cup Championship (1920)
- Olympic Gold Medalist (1920)
