= Chris Fridfinnson =

Icelandic-Canadian ice hockey player

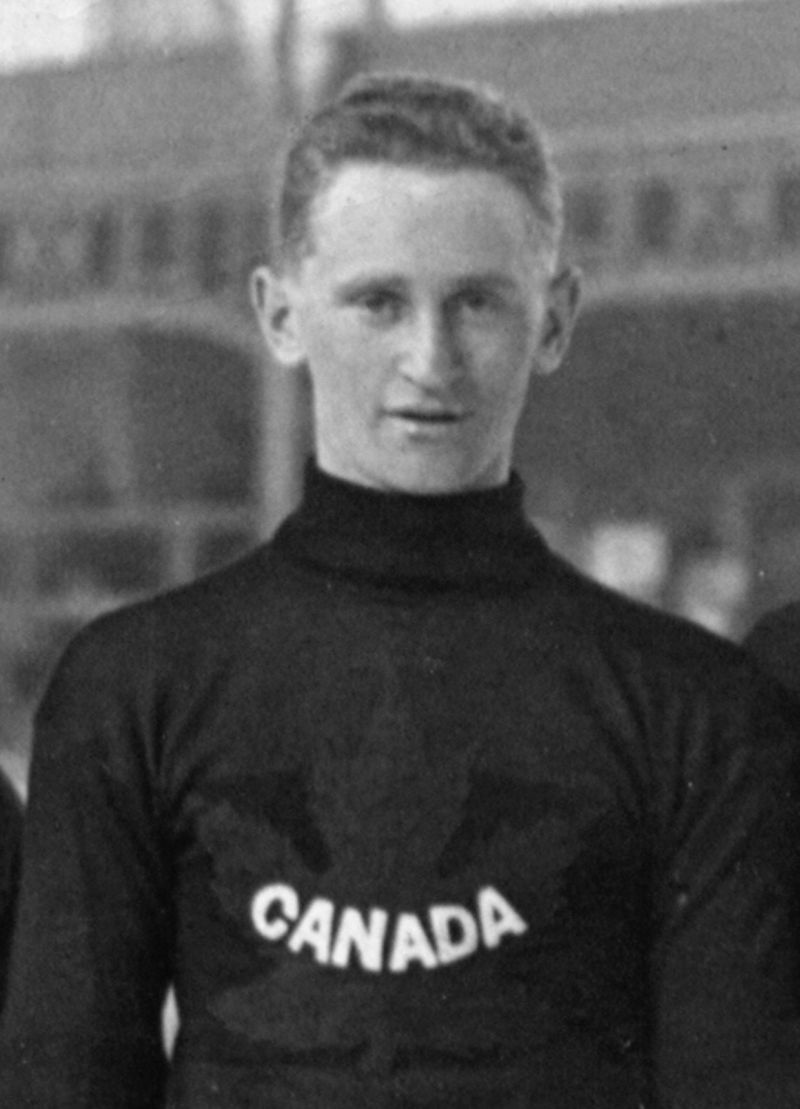
- Fridfinnson at the 1920 Olympics.
- Born: June 14, 1898 Baldur, Manitoba, Canada
- Died: November 10, 1938 (aged 40) Selkirk, Manitoba, Canada
- Height: 5 ft 10 in (178 cm)
- Weight: 127 lb (58 kg; 9 st 1 lb)
- Position: Rover
- Played for: Winnipeg Falcons
- National team: Canada
- Playing career: 1915–1922
Medal record
Olympic Games
Gold medal – first place	1920 Antwerp	Team

Kristmundur Numi Fridfinnson (June 14, 1898 – November 10, 1938) was an Icelandic-Canadian ice hockey player who competed in the 1920 Summer Olympics. He was born in Baldur, Manitoba. Fridfinnson was the rover for the Winnipeg Falcons, the Canadian team in the 1920 Olympics, and scored the winning goal in the game which decided the gold medal, a game the Canadians won 12–1.

== Personal life ==
Fridfinnson was born in 1898 to Icelandic immigrants Jón Friðfinnsson and Anna Sigríður Jónsdóttir. He died in Selkirk, Manitoba.

== Awards and achievements ==
- Allan Cup Championship (1920)
