= Albin Jansson =

Swedish ice hockey player

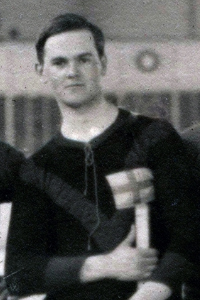
- Jansson at the 1920 Olympics.
- Born: 9 October 1897 Stockholm, Sweden
- Died: 22 March 1985 (aged 87) Gothenburg, Sweden
- Position: Goaltender
- National team: Sweden
- Playing career: 1919–1931

Albin Theodor "Abbe" Jansson (9 October 1897 – 22 March 1985) was a Swedish ice hockey player who competed in the 1920 Summer Olympics. In 1920, he was a member of the Swedish ice hockey team which finished fourth in the Summer Olympics tournament. He played one match as goaltender.
