= Wilhelm Arwe =

Swedish ice hockey player, bandy player, and footballer

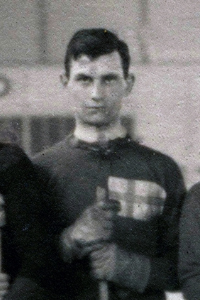
- Arwe at the 1920 Olympics.
- Born: 26 January 1898 Ölserud, Sweden
- Died: 8 April 1980 (aged 82) Stockholm, Sweden
- Position: Right wing
- Played for: Göta; Djurgården
- National team: Sweden
- Playing career: 1919–1929

Karl Wilhelm Konrad Arwe (28 January 1898 – 8 April 1980) was a Swedish ice hockey player, bandy player, and footballer who competed in the 1920 Summer Olympics and in the 1924 Winter Olympics. He was born in Ölserud, Sweden and grew up in Stockholm, Sweden.

In 1920 he was a member of the Swedish ice hockey team which finished fourth in the Summer Olympics tournament. He played three matches and scored two goals.

Four years later he finished again fourth with the Swedish team in the first Winter Olympics ice hockey tournament.

He played 16 times for Sweden between 1920 and 1924 and scored 5 goals. He represented for IK Göta and Djurgårdens IF. In 1921 he won the European championship. In 1926 he became Swedish champion with Djurgården.
