= Anthony Conroy =

American ice hockey player

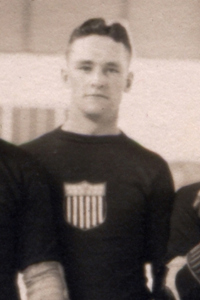
- Conroy at the 1920 Olympics.
- Born: October 18, 1895 Saint Paul, Minnesota, U.S.
- Died: January 11, 1978 (aged 82) Saint Paul, Minnesota, U.S.
- Height: 5 ft 8 in (173 cm)
- Weight: 155 lb (70 kg; 11 st 1 lb)
- Position: Right wing
- Shot: Right
- National team: United States
- Playing career: 1914–1928
Medal record
Olympic Games
Silver medal – second place	1920 Antwerp	Team

Anthony Joseph "Tony" Conroy (October 19, 1895 – January 11, 1978) was an American ice hockey player. He played as a forward on the United States hockey teams. The team competed in the 1920 Summer Olympics, winning the silver medal. He moved into the pros with the St. Paul Saints in 1925–26, turning down offers from National Hockey League teams to play out his career in his hometown.

Conroy was born, and died, in Saint Paul, Minnesota.
