= Frank Synott =

American ice hockey player

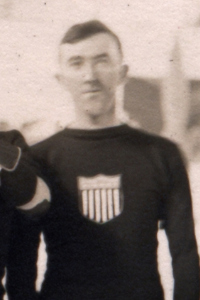
- Synott at the 1920 Olympics
- Born: December 28, 1890 Chatham, New Brunswick, Canada
- Died: October 12, 1945 (aged 54) Boston, Massachusetts, U.S.
- Height: 5 ft 5 in (165 cm)
- Weight: 130 lb (59 kg; 9 st 4 lb)
- Position: Left wing
- Shot: Left
- National team: United States
- Playing career: 1910–1924
Medal record
Olympic Games
Silver medal – second place	1920 Antwerp	Team
Silver medal – second place	1924 Chamonix	Team

Francis Allen "Red" Synott (December 28, 1890 – October 12, 1945) was a Canadian-born American ice hockey star of the early 1920s, playing on the first two United States hockey teams, and winning silver medals with them in 1920 and 1924. Besides the Olympics, he won a world championship with the U.S. in 1920.

Synott also played for Boston A.A. for a brief period (1919–1920).
