= Cyril Weidenborner =

American ice hockey player

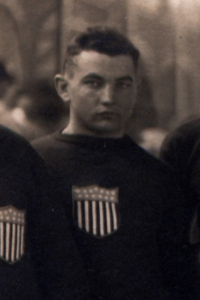
- Weidenborner at the 1920 Olympics.
- Born: March 30, 1895 Saint Paul, Minnesota, U.S.
- Died: November 26, 1983 (aged 88) Beltrami, Minnesota, U.S.
- Height: 5 ft 6 in (168 cm)
- Weight: 145 lb (66 kg; 10 st 5 lb)
- Position: Goaltender
- National team: United States
- Playing career: 1914–1920
Medal record
Olympic Games
Silver medal – second place	1920 Antwerp	Team

Cyril Aloysius Weidenborner (March 30, 1895 – November 26, 1983) was an American ice hockey player. He played as a goaltender on the United States hockey teams. The team competed in the 1920 Summer Olympics, winning the silver medal.
