= Winnipeg Falcons =

Canadian senior ice hockey team

- City: Winnipeg, Manitoba, Canada
- League: Independent Hockey League (formerly); Manitoba Hockey League (formerly)
- Founded: 1908
- Colours: Green, blue, yellow
- Website: winnipegfalcons.com

The Winnipeg Falcons were a senior men's amateur ice hockey team based in Winnipeg, Manitoba. The Winnipeg Falcons won the 1920 Allan Cup. That team went on to represent Canada in the 1920 Olympic games held in Antwerp, Belgium. There the Falcons, soundly beating all their opponents, won for Canada the first Olympic gold medal in ice hockey.

The Winnipeg Falcons hockey team was founded in 1911 with a roster made almost entirely of Icelandic Canadian players who had not been able to join other Winnipeg teams due to ethnic prejudice. In their first season, 1911–1912, they finished at the bottom of their league. The next year, Konnie Johannesson and Frank Fredrickson joined the team. That team turned out to be a winner in the league.

== Early history ==
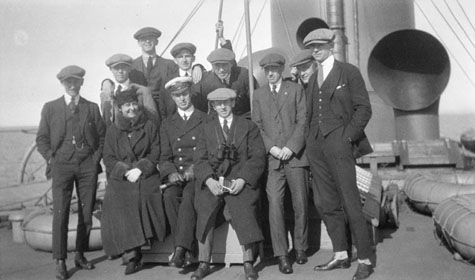
Winnipeg Falcons on route to the 1920 Olympics (photo includes an unidentified ships' officer and a woman)

The early roots of the Winnipeg Falcons can be traced back to the Icelandic Athletic Club which was formed in 1898. The club consisted of a two team league called the Icelandic Athletic Club (IAC) and the Vikings. In 1908, the two teams agreed to become one team. The Winnipeg Falcons had been excluded from the city league because of their racial origin. Almost all of the Falcons' players were of Icelandic descent and the falcon is Iceland's national bird.

During the 1910–11 season, the Falcons became part of a new senior league. Other clubs in the league would include the Kenora Thistles, Brandon Wheat City and Winnipeg AAA. In 1913–14, the Falcons became part of the Independent Hockey League, joining the Strathconas from Winnipeg and teams from Selkirk and Portage la Prairie. The Falcons finished the season with 4 wins and 8 losses. During the following season, the Falcons beat Portage by a score of 4–3 to become league champions.

During the First World War, seven of the eight Falcons players enlisted to serve and went overseas. Two players — Frank Thorsteinson and George Cumbers — died in the war. The other five returned to Winnipeg after the war in 1919 and reassembled the team.

== 1920 Allan Cup ==
The Winnipeg Falcons won the 1920 Allan Cup, as part of the Manitoba Hockey League with Brandon Wheat City and the Selkirk Fishermen. The first place team of the Manitoba Hockey League would play the champion of the Winnipeg Hockey League for the opportunity to represent Western Canada in the Allan Cup playoffs. The Falcons beat the Fishermen 5–3 to claim the Manitoba Hockey League championship. Frank Fredrickson won the Manitoba Hockey League scoring title with 23 goals in 10 games. Wally Byron led the league with two shutouts and had a 2.57 goals against average. Bobby Benson led the league with 26 penalties in minutes. Winning the Allan Cup gave the Winnipeg Falcons their Olympic opportunity.

== 1920 Summer Olympics ==
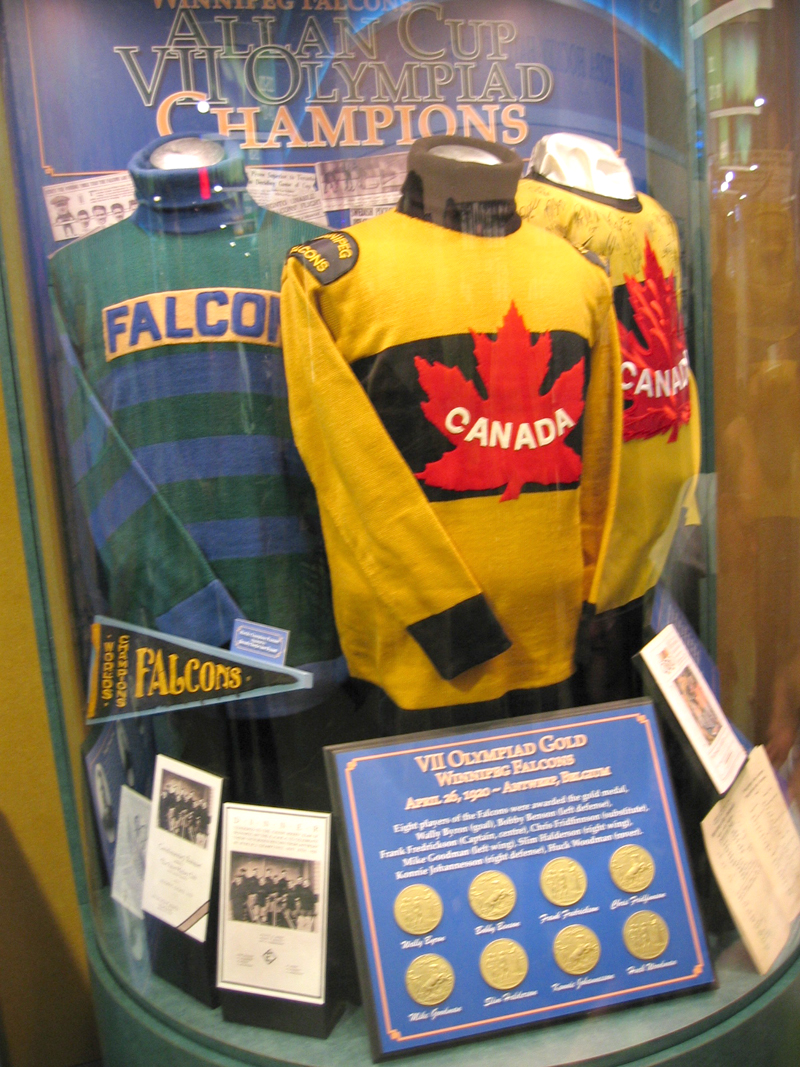
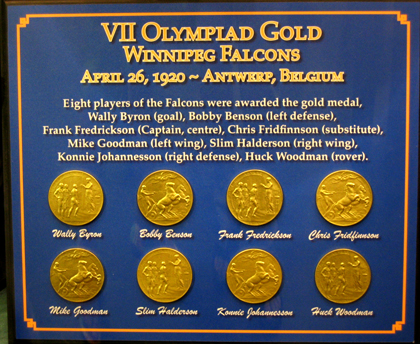
1920 Olympic Games memorabilia for the Winnipeg Falcons

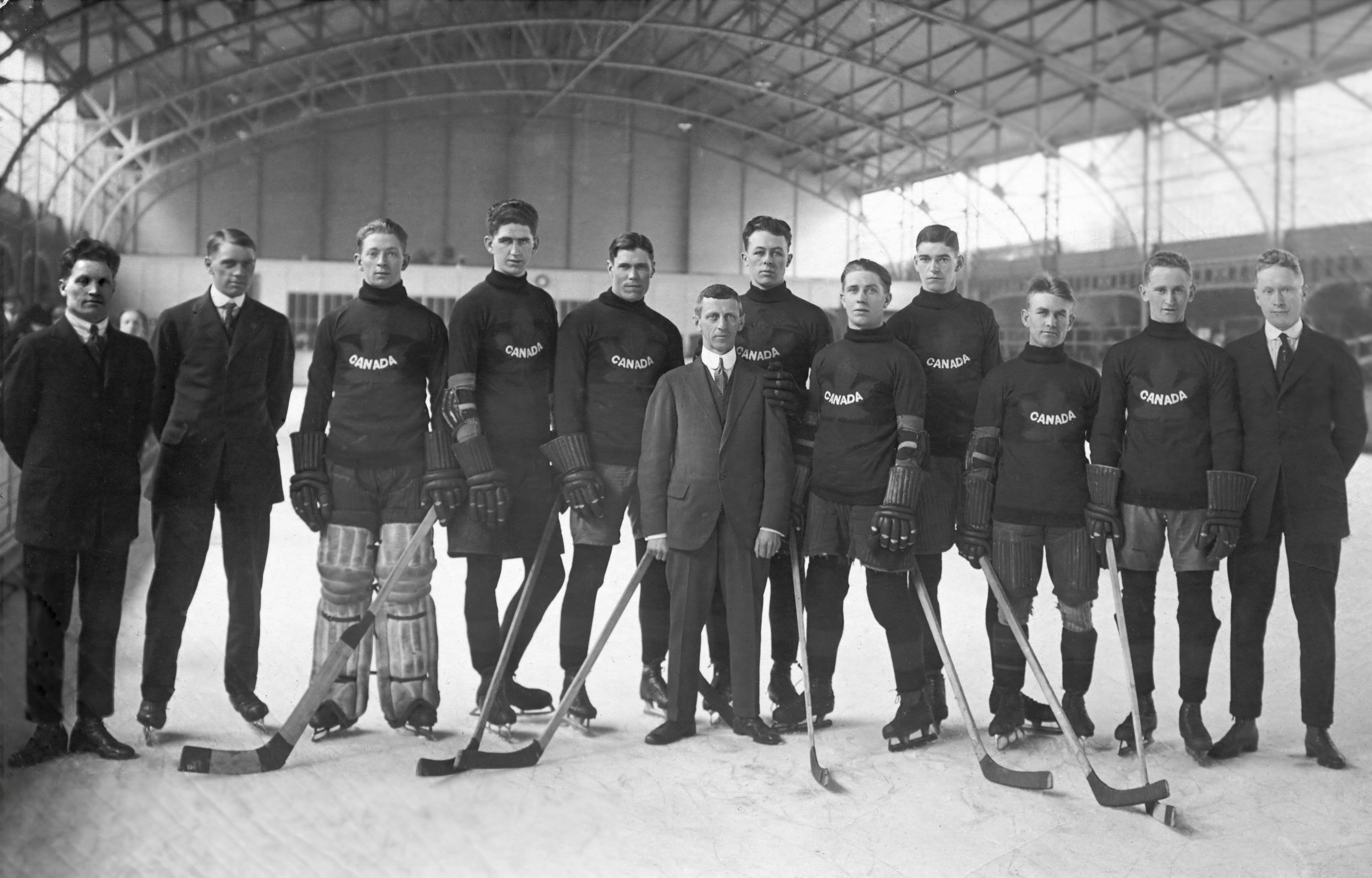
Winnipeg Falcons at the 1920 Summer Olympics

The Canadian Amateur Hockey Association (CAHA) chose the Falcons as the Allan Cup champions to represent the Canada men's national team in ice hockey at the 1920 Summer Olympics, instead of forming a national all-star team on short notice. W. A. Hewitt represented the Canadian Olympic Committee and oversaw finances for the Falcons, and reported on the Olympic Games for Canadian newspapers. He and his wife were a father and mother figure to the Falcons, and sailed with them aboard SS Melita from Saint John to Liverpool, then onto Antwerp.

It was there that the team won the first Olympic gold medal in ice hockey, outscoring their opponents by a combined score of 29–1 in three games. Although an official part of those Summer Olympic Games, hockey and figure skating events were held in late April and early May, while the weather was still cool enough for suitable ice conditions in the arena. The players were welcomed home to Winnipeg in May with a parade, a banquet and gifts of gold watches.

=== Olympic roster ===
Executives:

- Hebbie Axford D.F.C.(Club President)
- Bill Fridfinnson (Secretary)
- W. A. Hewitt (Canadian Olympic representative)
- Gordon Sigurjonsson (Coach, Trainer)

Players:

- Robert Benson (Left defence)
- Walter Byron (Goal)
- Frank Fredrickson (Captain, center)
- Chris Fridfinnson (Substitute)
- Magnus Goodman (Left wing)
- Haldor Halderson (Right wing)
- Konrad Johannesson (Right defence)
- Allan Woodman (Rover)

Five other players also contributed to the Falcons 1919–20 season, but were not part of the Olympic roster. Their names were Harvey Benson, Ed Stephenson, Connie Neil, Babs Dunlop and Sam Laxdal.

== Post-Olympics ==
Winnipeg Free Press, April 27th, 1920 on the Olympic win.

The Falcons and the Hewitts returned home aboard SS Grampian from Le Havre to Quebec City. The Falcons honoured Hewitt and his wife at a private dinner and presented them with a silver cup inscribed with the number 13, for the number of people who made the trip to the Olympics and the team's lucky number. Upon their return from the games, the Winnipeg Falcons were hailed as conquering heroes but this was a far cry from the attitude that had previously been expressed by Winnipeg hockey officials. The Falcons were given a large banquet upon their return and each played received a watch from the City of Winnipeg.

At the beginning of the 1920–21 season, CAHA president H. J. Sterling was suspicious of multiple players changing their addresses for the purpose of playing on a new team, and hired a detective to investigate the amateur status of players in Canada. The Amateur Athletic Union of Canada voided the amateur registration cards of former Falcons' players Haldor Halderson and Robert Benson halfway through the season. Sterling's detective discovered that neither had worked in Saskatoon and the pair received C$6,500 to play hockey. Sterling ordered the suspension of the Saskatoon team from the 1921 Allan Cup playoffs, although the Saskatchewan Amateur Hockey Association allowed the team and players to continue in the league playoffs.

The first member of the squad to pass away was Chris Fridfinnson who died at the age of 40 in 1938. The last surviving member was Mike Goodman. He was 93 years old when he died in 1991.

The Icelandic national hockey team honours the Falcons on their jerseys by using the Icelandic Falcon and the Canadian maple leaf as their emblem.

== NHL alumni ==
Winnipeg Falcons

- Bobby Benson
- Mud Bruneteau
- Art Chapman
- Frank Fredrickson
- Haldor Halderson
- John Morrison
- Art Somers
- Cully Wilson

Winnipeg Junior Falcons

- Doug Baldwin
- Al Carr
- Phil Hergesheimer
- Art Somers

== Legacy ==
Unveiling of prominent display at MTS Centre, Winnipeg

The Falcons were honoured in a new Heritage Minute segment in 2014. The segment, narrated by George Stroumboulopoulos and featuring actor Jared Keeso, shares how the Falcons overcame discrimination and stayed together through the First World War on their way to the top of the hockey world. The Falcons segment premiered at the MTS Centre in Winnipeg on November 6, 2014, during the intermission of a game between the Winnipeg Jets and Pittsburgh Penguins.

The Hockey Hall of Fame in Toronto, Manitoba Hockey Hall of Fame and Manitoba Sports Hall of Fame and Museum have permanent displays honouring the Falcons and their Olympic victory. The 1920 Winnipeg Falcons were inducted into the Manitoba Hockey Hall of Fame in the team category.

On August 31, 2004, Hockey Canada, in recognition of the Falcons' achievement, used a replica yellow and black jersey as alternate jerseys for the 2004 World Cup of Hockey against Team USA. Later that year, on December 20 national junior team wore replicas of the famous old gold and black Falcons uniforms for a World Junior Championship pre-tournament game in Winnipeg.

On July 31, 2019, Parks Canada announced that in recognition of the Falcons winning the first gold medal in Olympic ice hockey in 1920, the victory would be recognized as a "National Historical Event".

== Sources ==
- Podnieks, Andrew (1997). Canada's Olympic Hockey Teams: The Complete History 1920–1998. Toronto, Ontario: Doubleday Canada. ISBN 0-385-25688-4.
- Podnieks, Andrew; Hockey Hall of Fame (2005). Silverware. Toronto, Ontario: Fenn Publishing. ISBN 1-55168-296-6.
- Holland, Dave. Canada on Ice; The World Hockey Championships, 1920–2008. Toronto, Ontario: Canada On Ice Productions, 2008. ISBN 978-0-9808936-0-1.
- The Official Olympic Games Companion: The Complete Guide to the Olympic Winter Games, 1998 Edition. London: Brassey's Sports, 1998. ISBN 1-85753-244-9.
- Square, David. When Falcons Fly: The Story of the World's First Olympic Gold Hockey Team. Vancouver, British Columbia: Poppy Productions, 2007. ISBN 978-0-9782818-0-9.
- Zweig, Eric. Long Shot, How the Winnipeg Falcons won the first Olympic Hockey Gold. Toronto, Ontario: James Lorimer and Company, 2007. ISBN 1-55028-974-8.

Preceded by None	Canada men's Olympic ice hockey team 1920	Succeeded by Toronto Granites
