= Nils Molander =

Swedish ice hockey player and speed skater

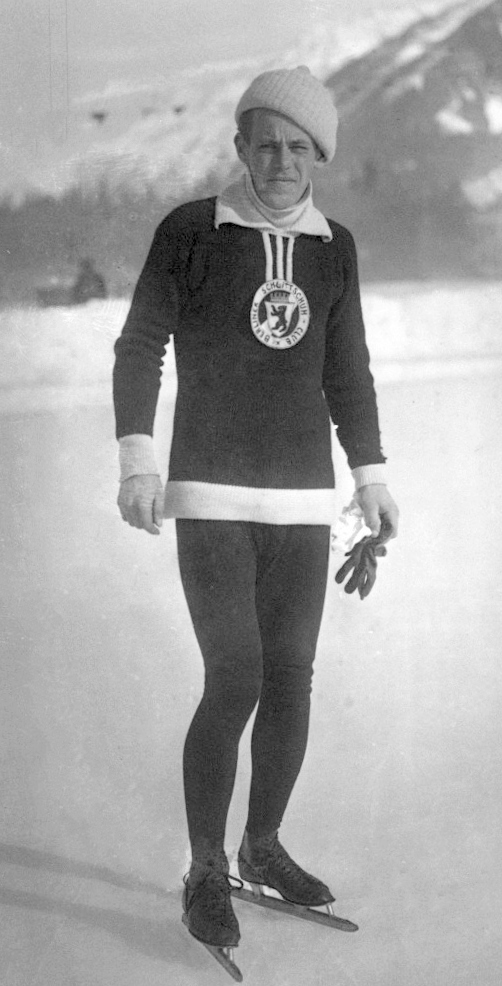
- Nils Molander in 1914

Personal information
- Born: 22 June 1889 Stockholm, Sweden
- Died: 30 January 1974 (aged 84) Stockholm, Sweden

Sport
- Sport: Ice hockey, speed skating
- Club: Berliner Schlittschuhclub, Berlin

Nils Edward Josef "Nisse, Molle" Molander (22 June 1889 – 30 January 1974) was a Swedish ice hockey player. He played at the 1920 Summer Olympics and 1924 Winter Olympics and finished in fourth place on both occasions. He also competed at the 1914 European Speed Skating Championships.
