= Edward Fitzgerald (ice hockey) =

American ice hockey player

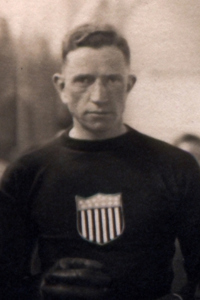
- Fitzgerald at the 1920 Olympics.
- Born: August 3, 1891 Northfield, Minnesota, U.S.
- Died: April 18, 1966 (aged 74) Saint Paul, Minnesota, U.S.
- Height: 5 ft 11 in (180 cm)
- Weight: 175 lb (79 kg; 12 st 7 lb)
- Position: Defense
- National team: United States
- Playing career: 1914–1922
Medal record
Olympic Games
Silver medal – second place	1920 Antwerp	Team

James Edward Fitzgerald (August 3, 1891 – April 18, 1966) was an American ice hockey player who competed in the 1920 Summer Olympics. He was a defenseman on the American ice hockey team, which won the silver medal. He was born in Northfield, Minnesota.
