= Walter Byron (ice hockey) =

Canadian ice hockey player

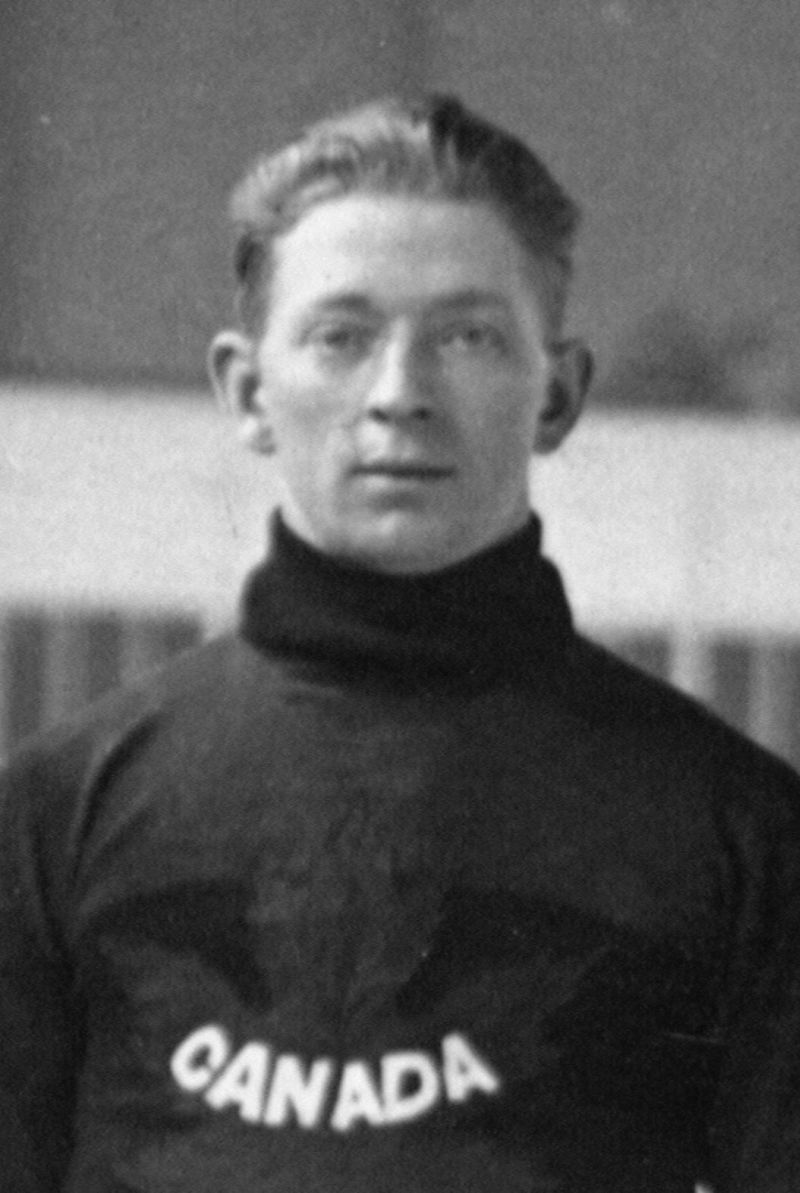
- Walter Byron at the 1920 Olympics.
- Born: September 2, 1894 Winnipeg, Manitoba, Canada
- Died: December 22, 1971 (aged 77) Winnipeg, Manitoba, Canada
- Height: 5 ft 10 in (178 cm)
- Weight: 143 lb (65 kg; 10 st 3 lb)
- Position: Goaltender
- Caught: Right
- Played for: Winnipeg Falcons
- National team: Canada
- Playing career: 1914–1932
Medal record
Olympic Games
Gold medal – first place	1920 Antwerp	Team

Jacob Walter "Wally" Byron (Jacob Valdimar Björnsson; September 2, 1894 – December 22, 1971) was an Icelandic-Canadian ice hockey player who competed in the 1920 Summer Olympics. He was the goaltender for the Winnipeg Falcons, the Canadian team that won the gold medal. He was born and died in Winnipeg, Manitoba. He was of Icelandic descent, son of Björn Bjarnarson Byron and his wife Margrét Kristmannsdóttir.

== Awards and achievements ==
- Allan Cup Championship (1920)
- Olympic Gold Medalist (1920)
- "Honoured Member" of the Manitoba Hockey Hall of Fame
