= Joseph McCormick (ice hockey) =

Ice hockey player

Joe McCormick
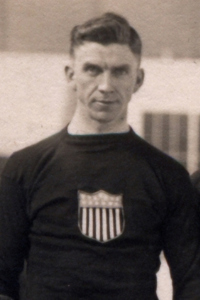
- Born: August 12, 1894 Buckingham, Quebec, Canada
- Died: June 14, 1958 (aged 63) Sudbury, Ontario, Canada
- Height: 5 ft 9 in (175 cm)
- Weight: 150 lb (68 kg; 10 st 10 lb)
- Position: Right wing
- Shot: Right
- Played for: Portland Rosebuds (WHL); Edmonton Eskimos (WHL); St. Paul Athletic Club (USAHA); Pittsburgh Yellow Jackets (USAHA)
- National team: United States
- Playing career: 1915–1918; 1919–1932
Medal record
Olympic Games
Silver medal – second place	1920 Antwerp	Team

Joseph Wallace McCormick (August 12, 1894 – June 14, 1958) was a Canadian-born ice hockey player, from Buckingham, Quebec. Early in his career, during World War I, he played in Pittsburgh for the Duquesne Garden and Pittsburgh Athletic Association teams. In 1918, Joe enlisted in the U.S. Army. His older brother, Lawrence, followed his lead shortly afterwards. Joe served in the Army in France during the war. Because the brothers held an honorable discharge from the Army, they were entitled to automatic US citizenship and on March 17, 1920, just five weeks before playing in the 1920 Summer Olympics, they both became naturalized Americans.

He was the captain and a forward on the 1920 American ice hockey team, which eventually won the silver medal. He returned to Pittsburgh and played for the Yellow Jackets until March 30, 1922. He was one of the leading scorers in the amateur ranks throughout his career. The January 23, 1922 issue of the Pittsburgh Post-Gazette described McCormick as "one of the cleanest and fairest players to ever don a uniform". The Post-Gazette also stated that he had one of the most powerful shots in hockey, "shooting past goaltenders from 50 feet away". He later ended his career with the Portland Rosebuds in 1925. On October 7, 1925, McCormick was traded to Portland along with Bobby Trapp in exchange for Eddie Shore and Art Gagne.
