= Raymond Bonney =

American ice hockey player

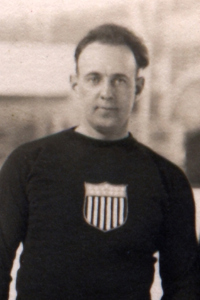
- Bonney at the 1920 Olympics.
- Born: April 5, 1892 Phoenix, New York, United States
- Died: October 19, 1964 (aged 72) Ottawa, Ontario, CAN
- Height: 5 ft 10 in (178 cm)
- Weight: 180 lb (82 kg; 12 st 12 lb)
- Position: Goaltender
- Played for: St. Paul Athletic Club; Pittsburgh Athletic Association; Pittsburgh Yellow Jackets
- National team: United States
- Playing career: 1912–1927
Medal record
Olympic Games
Silver medal – second place	1920 Antwerp	Team

Raymond Leroy Bonney (April 5, 1892 – October 19, 1964) was an American ice hockey player who competed in the 1920 Summer Olympics. He was born in Phoenix, New York. He was the goaltender who competed in 1920 for the American ice hockey team, which won the silver medal.
