= Lawrence McCormick =

Ice hockey player (1888–1961)

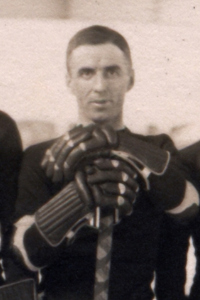
- McCormick at the 1920 Olympics.
- Born: July 12, 1888 Buckingham, Quebec, Canada
- Died: December 30, 1961 (aged 73) Hyannis, Massachusetts, United States
- Height: 5 ft 5 in (165 cm)
- Weight: 145 lb (66 kg; 10 st 5 lb)
- Position: Center
- Shot: Left
- Played for: Pittsburgh Yellow Jackets
- National team: United States
- Playing career: 1906–1922
Medal record
Olympic Games
Silver medal – second place	1920 Antwerp	Team

Lawrence James McCormick (July 12, 1888 – December 30, 1961) was a Canadian-born American ice hockey player who became a naturalized citizen of the United States on March 17, 1920, and competed in the 1920 Summer Olympics for the American ice hockey team, which won the silver medal.

Larry was the older brother of Joseph McCormick, who served as the captain of the 1920 United States Olympic ice hockey team. While the McCormicks were both from Buckingham, Quebec, they had served in the U. S. Army in France during World War I. Because the brothers each held an honorable discharge from the Army, they were entitled to automatic U.S. citizenship and on March 17, 1920, just five weeks before playing in the 1920 Summer Olympics, they both became naturalized Americans. Prior to the war, both of the brothers played in Pittsburgh for the Pittsburgh Athletic Association and the Yellow Jackets.
