= Ice hockey at the 1920 Summer Olympics =

Ice hockey at the Games of the VII Olympiad
1st Ice Hockey World Championships
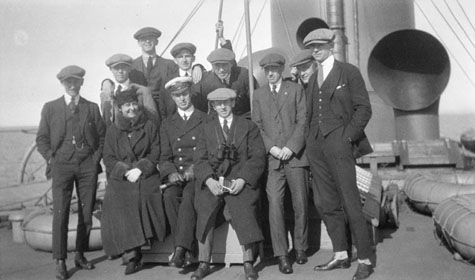
- Picture of the Gold Medal-winning Winnipeg Falcons taken en route to the 1920 Olympics (photo includes an unidentified ships' officer and a woman)

Tournament details
- Host country: Belgium
- Dates: April 23–29, 1920
- Format: Bergvall System
- Teams: 7

Final positions
- Champions: Canada; Winnipeg Falcons (1st title)
- Runners-up: United States
- Third place: Czechoslovakia
- Fourth place: Sweden

Tournament statistics
- Games played: 10
- Goals scored: 99 (9.9 per game)
- Attendance: 6,946 (695 per game)
- Scoring leader: Herb Drury (14 points)

Ice hockey was introduced to the Olympic Games at the 1920 Summer Olympics in Antwerp. The tournament also served as the first World Championships. The matches were played between April 23 and April 29, 1920. Canada, represented by the Winnipeg Falcons, won the gold medal. The silver went to the United States and Czechoslovakia took the bronze.

== Summary ==
The organizing committee for the hockey matches included Paul Loicq, the captain of the Belgian team and a future president of the Ligue Internationale de Hockey sur Glace (LIHG). The games used the Canadian ice hockey rules, and the Bergvall system to determine medal winning teams.

The Canadian Amateur Hockey Association (CAHA) chose the Winnipeg Falcons as the 1920 Allan Cup champions to represent the Canada men's national team, instead of forming a national all-star team on short notice. Canada's manager W. A. Hewitt, introduced the CAHA rules of play to the LIHG at the Olympics. Writer Andrew Podnieks described Hewitt's interpretation of the rules as "competitive yet gentlemanly", and that the rules of play were accepted for Olympic hockey. Hewitt refereed the first Olympic hockey game played, an 8–0 win by the Sweden men's national team versus the Belgium men's national team, on April 23, 1920.

All matches took place in the Palais de Glace d'Anvers (ice palace of Antwerp). The rink was smaller than North American standards, measuring 56 metres (184 ft) long by 18 metres (59 ft) wide. All games were played with seven players per side, with the rover position being used. For the duration of each match no substitutions were permitted and if a player exited the game due to injury the opposing team was forced to take a player out as well. Additional differences from modern play included a prohibition on forward passing and the requirement that all players including the goaltender be standing on his skates to play the puck. The duration of each game was two periods of twenty minutes each. Any game tied at the end of forty minutes would be extended by two periods of five minutes each, not sudden death. If tied at the end of fifty minutes, this process would repeat—and repeat as many times as needed until a winner is declared.

This was the first ice hockey tournament at an Olympic Games, and the only ever instance of it at a Summer Olympics. An ice hockey tournament was part of the inaugural Winter Olympics in 1924 and has been part of every Winter program since then.

== Medalists ==
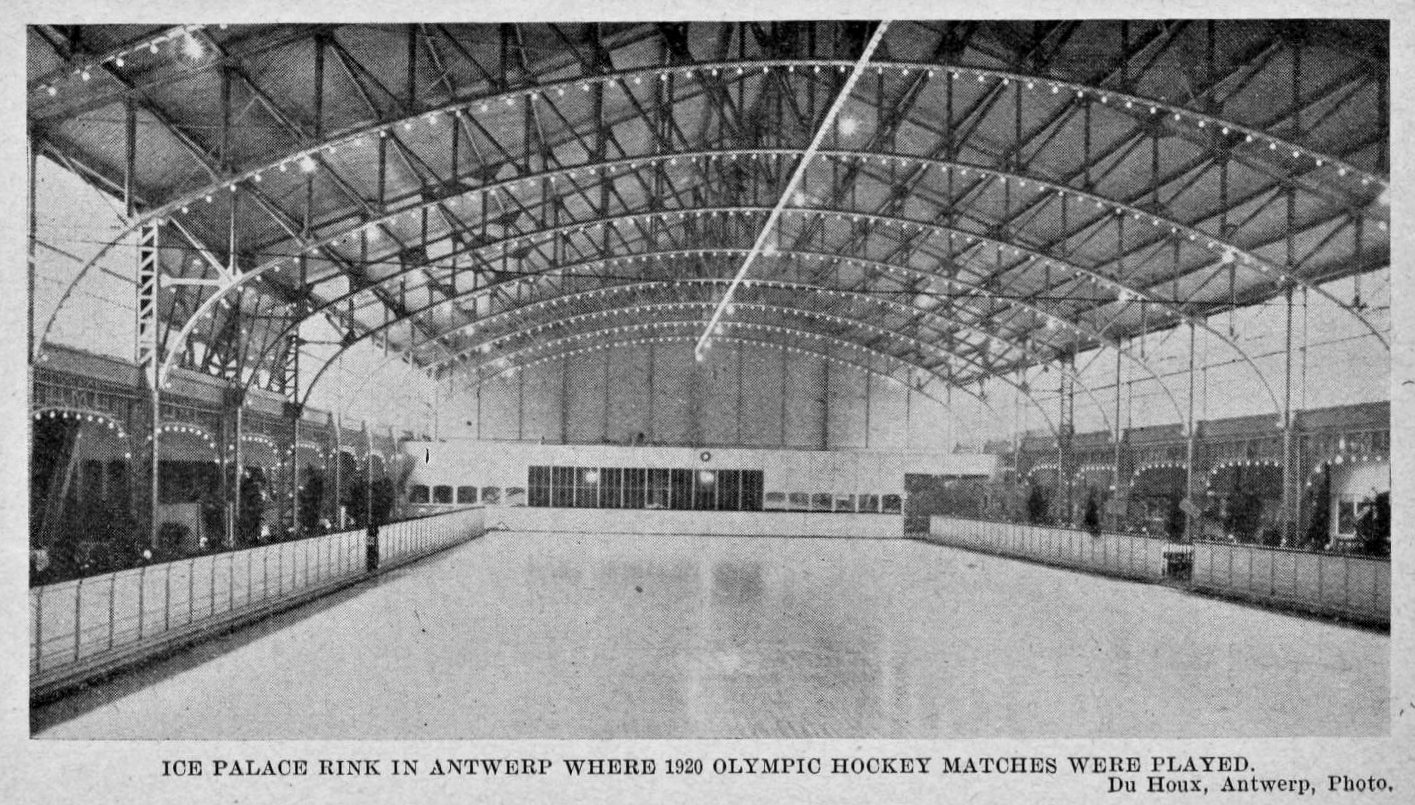
Palais de Glace d'Anvers ice rink where the ice hockey tournament was held.

Gold	Silver	Bronze
Canada Robert Benson; Walter Byron; Frank Fredrickson; Chris Fridfinnson; Magnus Goodman; Haldor Halderson; Konrad Johannesson; Allan Woodman	United States Raymond Bonney; Anthony Conroy; Herbert Drury; Edward Fitzgerald; George Geran; Frank Goheen; Joseph McCormick; Lawrence McCormick; Frank Synott; Leon Tuck; Cyril Weidenborner	Czechoslovakia Karel Hartmann; Vilém Loos; Jan Palouš; Jan Peka; Karel Pešek; Josef Šroubek; Otakar Vindyš; Karel Wälzer

== Participating nations ==
A total of 60 ice hockey players from 7 nations competed at the Antwerp Games:

- Belgium (7)
- Canada (8)
- Czechoslovakia (8)
- France (7)
- Sweden (11)
- Switzerland (8)
- United States (11)

== Format ==
Seven nations entered teams in the inaugural Olympic ice hockey tournament. The tournament format used the Bergvall system, starting with an elimination round to determine the gold medal winner, after which teams that lost to the tournament winner would play through a new bracket to determine silver. Finally, teams which lost to either the gold or silver winners would face off in a third bracket to determine the bronze winner. For the gold medal round, teams were drawn into the bracket with France receiving a bye to the semifinals.

At the time of draw, the Swedish team questioned how the matchups for the later rounds would be determined and it was believed that teams advancing further in the earlier round would receive a bye. However, no decision was made and when it came time for the silver medal round Sweden and the United States were selected to play a semifinal game while Czechoslovakia received the bye. Later for the bronze medal round, organizers wanted to ensure the tournament would conclude on schedule but were reluctant to force the Czechoslovaks to play twice in one day. As a result, the Swedish team were made to play another semifinal game which would be their fourth in as many days with the bronze medal game the following day. This led to criticism of the format despite Bergvall later noting that the system was not used correctly.

== Gold medal round (premier prix) ==
=== Bracket ===
Quarterfinals
April 23
Sweden	8
Belgium	0
April 24
United States	29
Switzerland	0
April 24
Canada	15
Czechoslovakia	0

Semifinals
April 25
Sweden	4
France	0
April 25
Canada	2
United States	0

Gold Medal Game
April 26
Canada (gold)	12
Sweden	1

=== Quarterfinals ===
23 April 1920; 21:30	Sweden	8 – 0 (5–0, 3–0)	Belgium	Palais de Glace d'Anvers

Game reference

Seth Howander
Goalies
François Vergult
Referee:
(Canada) W. A. Hewitt

Burman	1 – 0
Johansson	2 – 0
Burman	3 – 0
Lindqvist	4 – 0
Burman	5 – 0
Johansson	6 – 0
Molander	7 – 0
Lindqvist	8 – 0

12 min
Penalties
6 min

24 April 1920; 17:00	United States	29 – 0 (15–0, 14–0)	Switzerland	Palais de Glace d'Anvers

Game reference
Ray Bonney	Goalies	René Savoie	Referee: (United States) Raoul Le Mat
Conroy (8); J. McCormick (7); Drury (6); Goheen (6); Fitzgerald; Tuck / Goals			Referee: (United States) Raoul Le Mat
7 min	Penalties	0 min	Referee: (United States) Raoul Le Mat

24 April 1920; 21:30	Canada	15 – 0 (7–0, 8–0)	Czechoslovakia	Palais de Glace d'Anvers

Game reference
Walter Byron	Goalies	Jan Peka
Halderson (7); Fredrickson (4); Goodman (2); Woodman; Johannesson / Goals
0 min	Penalties	0 min

=== Semifinals ===
25 April 1920; 17:00	Sweden	4 – 0 (2–0, 2–0)	France	Palais de Glace d'Anvers

Game reference

Seth Howander
Goalies
Jacques Gaittet
Referee:
(Canada) Ernie Garon

Burman	1 – 0
Svensson	2 – 0
Molander	3 – 0
Lindqvist	4 – 0

0 min
Penalties
0 min

Shots
1

25 April 1920; 21:00	Canada	2 – 0 (0–0, 2–0)	United States	Palais de Glace d'Anvers

Game reference
Walter Byron	Goalies	Ray Bonney	Referee: (France) Alfred de Rauch
Fredrickson / 1 – 0; Johannesson / 2 – 0			Referee: (France) Alfred de Rauch
7 min	Penalties	5 min	Referee: (France) Alfred de Rauch

=== Gold medal game ===
26 April 1920; 22:00	(gold) Canada	12 – 1 (5–1, 7–0)	Sweden	Palais de Glace d'Anvers

Game reference

Walter Byron
Goalies
Seth Howander
Referee:
(United States) Joseph McCormick

Halderson – 1:15	1 – 0
Fridfinnson − 1:55	2 – 0
Fredrickson – 5:20	3 – 0
	3 – 1	15:58 – Svensson
Fredrickson – 16:00	4 – 1
Fredrickson – 17:35	5 – 1
Goodman – 23:47	6 – 1
Benson – 28:09	7 – 1
Fredrickson – 29:15	8 – 1
Fredrickson – 29:30	9 – 1
Fredrickson – 34:55	10 – 1
Halderson – 36:20	11 – 1
Fredrickson – 39:02	12 – 1

0 min
Penalties
0 min

== Silver medal round (second prix) ==
=== Bracket ===
Semifinal
April 27
United States	7
Sweden	0

Silver Medal Game
April 28
United States (silver)	16
Czechoslovakia	0

=== Semifinal ===
27 April 1920; 22:00	United States	7 – 0 (5–0, 2–0)	Sweden	Palais de Glace d'Anvers

Game reference
Cy Weidenborner	Goalies	Seth Howander
Drury (4); Geran (3) / Goals
0 min	Penalties	0 min

=== Silver medal game ===
28 April 1920; 22:00	(silver) United States	16 – 0 (7–0, 9–0)	Czechoslovakia	Palais de Glace d'Anvers

Game reference
Cy Weidenborner	Goalies	Jan Peka	Referee: (Belgium) Paul Loicq
L. McCormick (7); Drury (4); Conroy (2); Goheen; J. McCormick; Synott / Goals			Referee: (Belgium) Paul Loicq
0 min	Penalties	0 min	Referee: (Belgium) Paul Loicq

== Bronze medal round (troisième prix) ==
=== Bracket ===
Semifinal
April 28
Sweden	4
Switzerland	0

Bronze Medal Game
April 29
Czechoslovakia (bronze)	1
Sweden	0

=== Semifinal ===
28 April 1920; 23:30	Sweden	4 – 0 (0–0, 4–0)	Switzerland	Palais de Glace d'Anvers

Game reference

Abbe Jansson
Goalies
René Savoie
Referee:
(Canada) Frank Fredrickson

Säfwenberg	1 – 0
Johansson	2 – 0
Arwe	3 – 0
Arwe	4 – 0

0 min
Penalties
0 min

=== Bronze medal game ===
29 April 1920; 23:00	(bronze) Czechoslovakia	1 – 0 (1–0, 0–0)	Sweden	Palais de Glace d'Anvers

Game reference
Karel Wälzer	Goalies	Seth Howander	Referee: (Canada) Frank Fredrickson
Šroubek / 1 – 0			Referee: (Canada) Frank Fredrickson
0 min	Penalties	0 min	Referee: (Canada) Frank Fredrickson
2	Shots	48	Referee: (Canada) Frank Fredrickson

== Statistics ==
=== Average age ===
Team France was the oldest team in the tournament, averaging 32 years and 11 months. Gold medalists Team Canada was the youngest team in the tournament, averaging 24 years and 5 months. Tournament average was 26 years and 9 months.

=== Scoring leaders ===
Player	GP	G
Herb Drury (USA)	4	14
Frank Fredrickson (CAN)	3	12
Anthony Conroy (USA)	4	10
Haldor Halderson (CAN)	3	9
Joe McCormick (USA)	3	8
Moose Goheen (USA)	6	7
Larry McCormick (USA)	1	5
Erik Burman (SWE)	5	4
Gerry Geran (USA)	2	3
Magnus Goodman (CAN)	3	3

Source: olympedia.org

== Final ranking ==
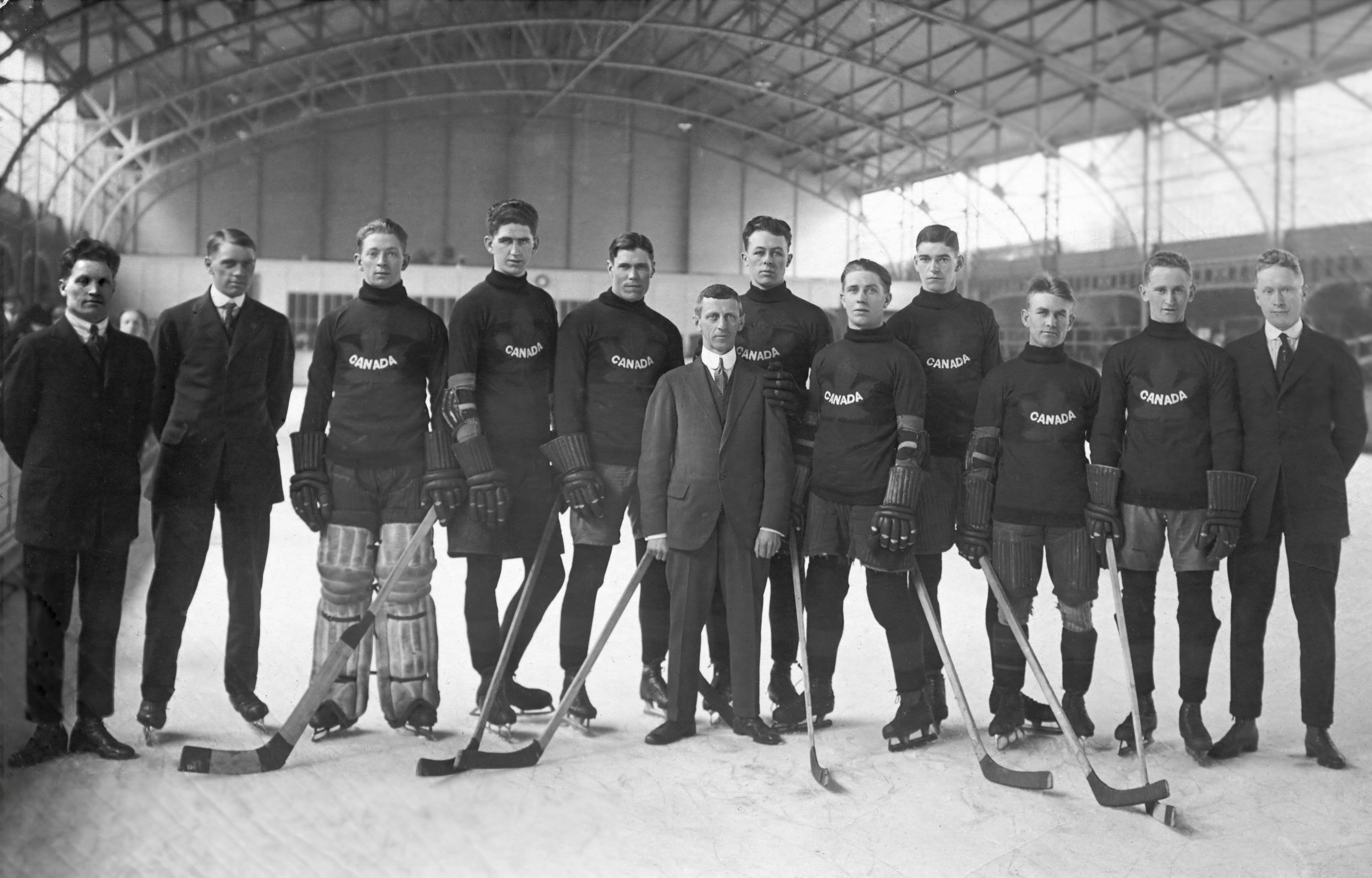
Winnipeg Falcons team photo at the 1920 Summer Olympics

Pos	Team	Pld	W	L	GF	GA	GD
1st place, gold medalist(s)	Canada	3	3	0	29	1	+28
2nd place, silver medalist(s)	United States	4	3	1	52	2	+50
3rd place, bronze medalist(s)	Czechoslovakia	3	1	2	1	31	−30
4	Sweden	6	3	3	17	20	−3
5	Switzerland	2	0	2	0	33	−33
5	France	1	0	1	0	4	−4
5	Belgium	1	0	1	0	8	−8

Source: olympedia.org

== Sources ==
- Podnieks, Andrew (1997). Canada's Olympic Hockey Teams: The Complete History 1920–1998. Toronto, Ontario: Doubleday Canada. ISBN 0-385-25688-4.
- Podnieks, Andrew; Hockey Hall of Fame (2005). Silverware. Toronto, Ontario: Fenn Publishing. ISBN 1-55168-296-6.
- Hansen, Kenth (May 1996), "The Birth of Swedish Ice Hockey – Antwerp 1920", Citius, Altiu, Fortius, 4 (2): 5–27
- Wallechinsky, David; Loucky, Jaime (2005), The Complete Book of the Winter Olympics: Turin 2006 Edition, Wilmington, Delaware: Sport Media Publishing, ISBN 1-894963-45-8
