= History of the International Ice Hockey Federation =

The History of the International Ice Hockey Federation which spans over a hundred years, chronicles the evolution of international cooperation in ice hockey. Among major achievements accomplished in that time is the standardization of playing rules and the establishment of tournaments.

== 1908–1913 ==
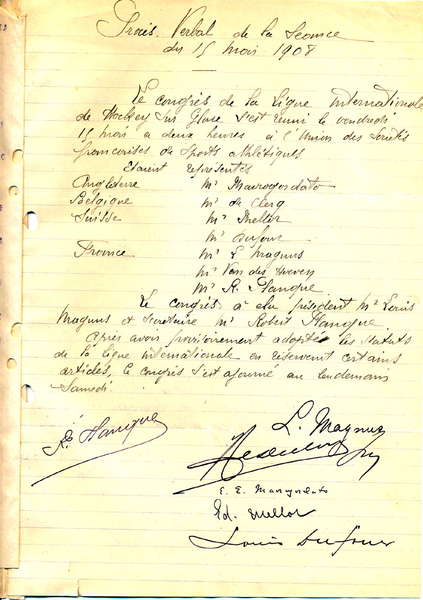
Foundation document of the LIHG

The International Ice Hockey Federation was founded on 15 May 1908 at 34 Rue de Provence in Paris, France, as Ligue Internationale de Hockey sur Glace (LIHG). The founders of the federation were representatives from Belgium, Bohemia, France, Great Britain and Switzerland. Louis Magnus, the French representative, was the fifth member to sign the founding document and also the first president of the LIHG.

The second congress was held from 22 to 25 January 1909 in Chamonix, France. Playing and competition rules were established, and an agreement was reached for an annual European Championship to be contested, beginning in 1910. The 1909 Coupe de Chamonix was contested during the congress. It was won by Princes Ice Hockey Club, representing Great Britain. Germany became the sixth LIHG member on 19 September 1909.

The third LIHG Congress was held on 9 January 1910 in Montreux, Switzerland. Louis Magnus was re-elected president and Peter Patton took on the position of vice-president. The first European Championship began in Les Avants a day after the conclusion of the congress. It was won by Great Britain.

Russia was added as the seventh LIHG member and Herman Kleeberg replaced Peter Patton as vice president at the fourth LIHG Congress, which was held in Berlin from 16 to 17 February 1911, in conjunction with the 1911 European Championship. On 14 March 1911, the LIHG adopted Canadian rules of ice hockey.

The fifth LIHG Congress took place from 22 to 23 March 1912, in Brussels, Belgium. Unlike the two previous conferences, it was not held in conjunction with the European Championships, which had been staged in Prague in early February. A verdict was reached regarding the fate of the past month's European Championship, which had been the subject of a protest by Germany. It was decided that the tournament would be annulled as Austria was not yet a LIHG member at the time of its playing. Austria, along with Sweden and Luxembourg, were accepted as LIHG members at the congress. Henri van den Bulcke succeeded Louis Magnus as LIHG president, and Max Sillig replaced Herman Kleeberg as vice-president. The first LIHG Championship was contested in Brussels from 20 to 24 March. It was held annually until 1914.

At the 1913 congress in St. Moritz, Max Sillig resigned his position as vice-president and was replaced by Peter Patton, who had previously served in the position from 1910 to 1911. In February 1913, LIHG arranged the first European Bandy Championship tournament in Davos, Switzerland.

== 1914–1945 ==
The 1914 congress was held in Berlin, the location of that year's European Championship. Louis Magnus replaced Van den Bulcke as president, but he resigned immediately as the other delegates did not follow his program. Peter Patton, vice-president at the time, then became president and had new elections staged. Van den Bulcke was again elected as president (a position he would hold until 1920), and Patton was returned to his prior role of vice-president.

World War I interrupted all activities of the federation between 1914 and 1920. The LIHG expelled Austria and Germany from its ranks following the war in 1920. Bohemia's membership was transferred to the new country of Czechoslovakia the same year.

The 1920 Olympics were the first to integrate hockey into their program. Canada and the United States made their debut on the international scene at the tournament. Their level of play was vastly superior to that of the Europeans and Canada took home the gold while the US won the silver medal. On 26 April 1920, at the LIHG Congress which was held during the Olympic tournament, both countries became members of the federation. Also at the congress, Max Sillig became president, and Paul Loicq and Frank Fellowes were elected as vice presidents.

Paul Loicq was elected as president in 1922. Karel Hartmann and Haddock were chosen as the new vice-presidents.

At the 1923 congress it was decided to consider the 1924 Olympic Games as the World Championship as well as to organize a parallel European Championship. Romania, Spain, and Italy were admitted to the LIHG the same year.

Austria was re-admitted to the LIHG in 1924, while the Swedish proposal to re-admit Germany was declined. The Swedes protested by leaving the LIHG. They returned in 1926 following the re-admission of Germany.

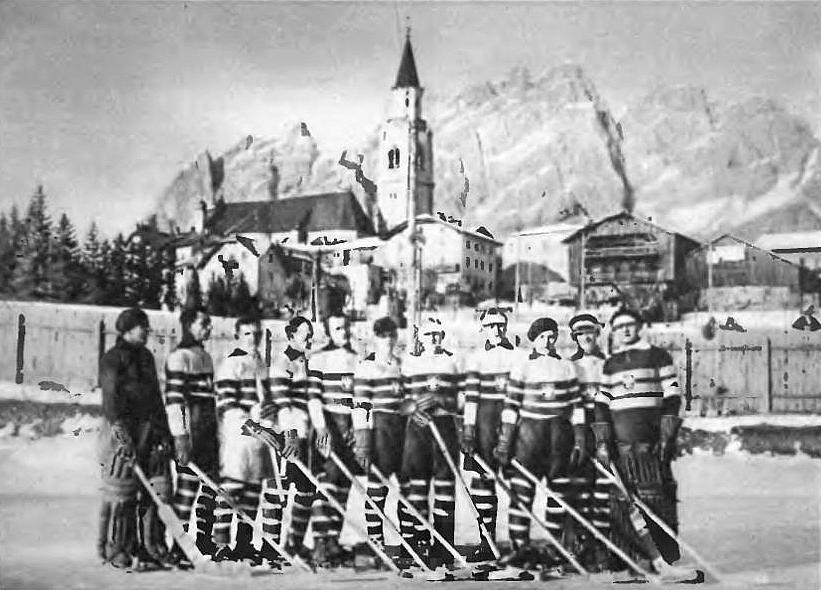
The Poland men's national ice hockey team debuted at the 1928 Winter Olympics.

The 1928 Winter Olympics, which also served as the World and European Championship for the year, saw a record 11 countries participate as Canada claimed their third gold medal.

At the 1929 congress, the LIHG decided to organize a stand-alone World Championship, beginning in 1930. The first World Championship began in Chamonix, but had to be concluded in Vienna and Berlin as the natural ice in Chamonix melted toward the end of the tournament. Canada was considered so dominant that it received a bye to the final, where it easily dispatched Germany to win the gold medal. Japan, which had joined the LIHG just days prior to the start of the tournament, entered a team consisting of medical students.

The 1932 Winter Olympics, held in Lake Placid, consisted of only four teams due to the Great Depression. Germany and Poland were the only European nations present as Canada won their fourth Olympic gold medal. The 1932 European Championship was contested as the last stand-alone European Championship. Nine countries participated and Sweden won their third European title.

The LIHG celebrated its 25th anniversary in 1933. Since its foundation in 1908, 18 European Championships, six World Championships, and four Olympic Games tournaments had been contested. The 1933 World Championship marked the first time that Canada failed to emerge victorious in a World Championship or Olympic tournament. They were defeated by the United States, 2–1 in overtime.

The Netherlands and Norway became LIHG members in 1935. The three Baltic states, Latvia, Estonia, and Lithuania joined the LIHG in 1931, 1935, and 1938 respectively. South Africa was accepted into the LIHG in 1937.

The 1936 Winter Olympics set a new record with 15 participants. Great Britain, consisting of a team in which nine of the 13 players had grown up in Canada, won their first and only Olympic gold medal at the tournament.

World War II disrupted all LIHG events – World, European, and Olympic tournaments alike – spanning from 1940 to 1946.

While the LIHG was inactive during the war, the Canadian Amateur Hockey Association and the Amateur Hockey Association of the United States (AHAUS) join to form the International Ice Hockey Association.

== 1946–1956 ==
The first LIHG Congress in seven years was held in Brussels on 27 April 1946. Germany and Japan were expelled from the federation, while the memberships of the three Baltic states – Lithuania, Latvia, and Estonia – were voided due to their annexation by the Soviet Union. Austria had its membership restored. It had been voided in 1939 following the country's union with Germany. Denmark entered the LIHG as a new member.

The first World Championship following the war was held in Prague in February 1947. Despite Canada's absence from the tournament, it received great fan support (especially from the Czechoslovak fans) as Czechoslovakia captured the gold medal. Paul Loicq, who had been the LIHG president for 25 years, resigned his position at the LIHG Congress which was being held simultaneously with the World Championship. He was replaced by Fritz Kraatz. During the 1947 championships, the LIHG agreed to a merger with the International Ice Hockey Association. Under the merger agreement, the LIHG presidency would alternate between North America and Europe every three years, and AHAUS was recognized as the governing body of hockey in the United States.

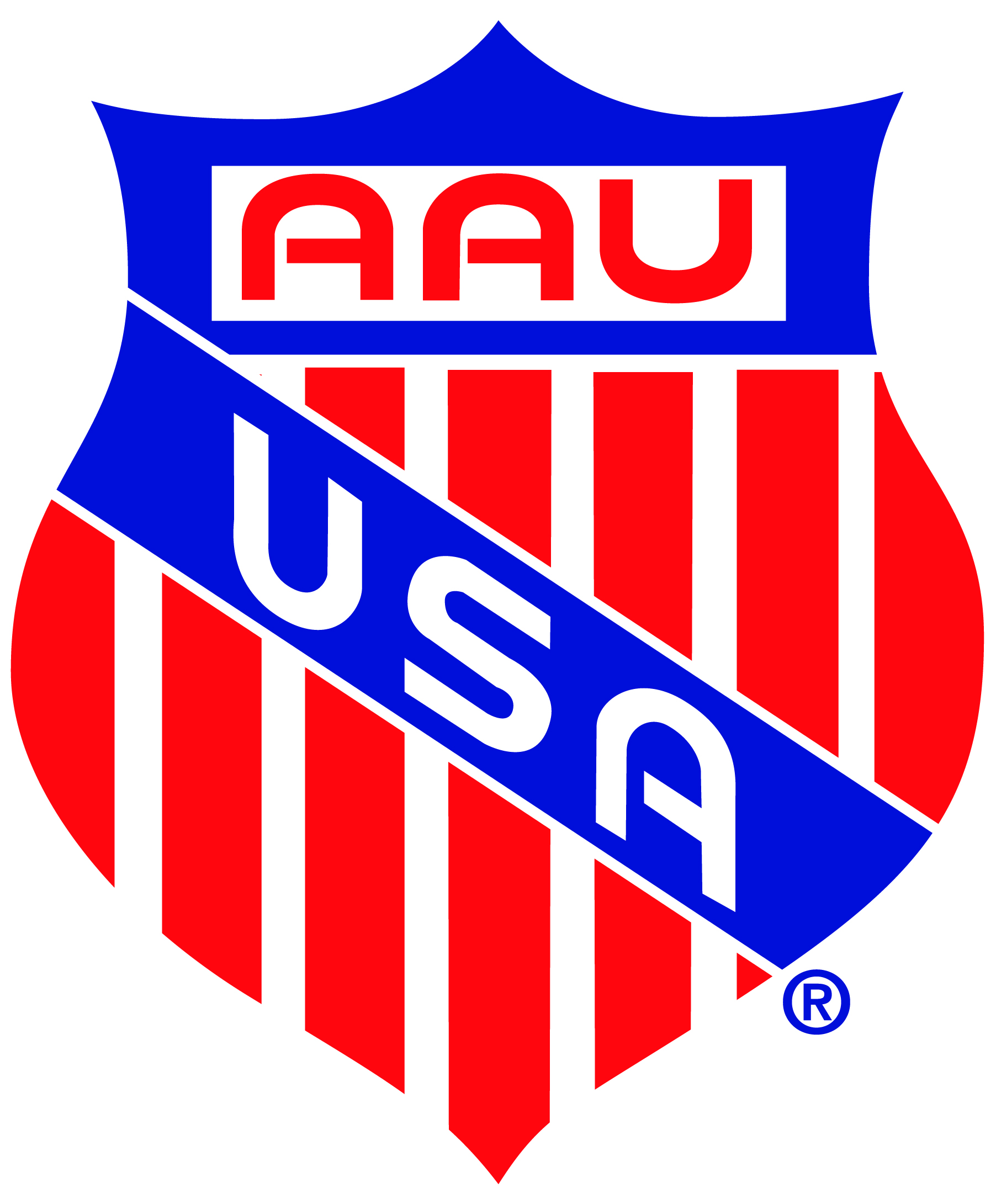
The Amateur Athletic Union was one of two American federations that sent teams to the 1948 Winter Olympics.

The 1948 Winter Olympics in St. Moritz were the subject of a power struggle between two American federations, the Amateur Athletic Union (AAU; recognized by the International Olympic Committee), and AHAUS which was recognized by the LIHG, both of which had sent teams to the tournament. The IOC initially declared that neither team would be allowed to participate, which led the LIHG to threaten a boycott of the entire ice hockey tournament. The IOC then conceded and allowed the AHAUS team to participate in the tournament and the AAU team to march in the opening ceremony. The AHAUS team was excluded from the final rankings of the Olympic tournament, but not from the World Championship, where they officially finished in fourth place.

W. G. Hardy replaced Fritz Kraatz as president in 1948. He would hold the position for three years, before being replaced by Kraatz, who began his second term in office as LIHG president. Germany and Japan were re-admitted and the Soviet Union – which would go on to win their first World Championship during their inaugural appearance in 1954 – joined as a new member during his tenure.

Walter A. Brown was elected LIHG president in 1954, replacing Dr. Fritz Kraatz. Meanwhile, the federation adopted an English name and became the International Ice Hockey Federation (IIHF). East Germany became the IIHF's 25th member in 1956.

In its early years, LIHG had also administrated bandy, but since Britain and the continental European countries eventually had ceased playing this sport, it virtually only lived on in the Nordic countries and the Soviet Union. Bandy had been played as a demonstration sport at the Oslo Winter Olympics in 1952, then only played by Finland, Norway and Sweden, and in 1955 these three countries and the Soviet Union founded the International Bandy Federation.

== 1957–1974 ==
The Hungarian Revolution of 1956 which had caused Hungary to be occupied by the Soviet Army, led to a boycott of the 1957 World Championships, which were being staged in Moscow. Canada and the United States led the boycott, and were joined by Norway, West Germany, Italy, and Switzerland.

The IIHF welcomed several new members between 1960 and 1963. Bulgaria and North Korea joined in 1960 while China and South Korea were accepted into the federation in 1963.

Flag of West Germany

Flag of East Germany (German Democratic Republic)

During the Cold War, Germany forfeited a game against East Germany rather than risk loss.

At the 1961 World Championship in Switzerland, the West German team – as advised by their federal government – refused to compete against East Germany, as in the event of an East German victory, they would've had to pay respects to the East German flag. The game was awarded to East Germany, 5–0, by virtue of a forfeit. Two years later, at the 1963 World Championship in Stockholm, the East Germans took payback on West Germany. Following a 4–3 defeat to the West Germans, the East German players turned their backs in unison to the West German flag as it was being hoisted.

The 1962 World Championship, hosted by the American cities of Colorado Springs and Denver, was boycotted by the Soviet Union and Czechoslovakia, which led to a further boycott by the other Eastern Bloc countries. At issue was the boycott of the 1957 championships in Moscow by Canada and the United States, and the Americans refusal of East German passports in reaction to the building of the Berlin Wall by East Germany.

The lower pools (A, B, and C) were contested annually beginning in 1961 and promotion-and-relegation between the pools started the same year. While the B Pool had been played as early as 1951, it was not held every year due to a frequent shortage of teams, and no promotion-and-relegation took place between it and the top division.

For the 1965–66 season, the IIHF created the European Cup, a tournament consisting of the top club teams from around Europe. The competition was originated by Günther Sabetzki, based on the Association football European Cup (now UEFA Champions League). In 1968 the IIHF organized the European U19 Championship, a junior competition for players aged 19 and under. The age limit was later reduced to 18 in 1977.

The IIHF saw three different presidents take office between 1957 and 1974. Bunny Ahearne was elected to three separate terms (the first from 1957 to 1960, the second from 1963 to 1966, and the third spanning from 1969 to 1975). Robert Lebel served in office from 1960 to 1963, while William Thayer Tutt was president from 1966 to 1969.

== 1975–1989 ==
IIHF logo (1986-2005)

In 1975, Sabetzki was elected president of the IIHF. He replaced Bunny Ahearne, whose heavy-handed regime had caused him to grow increasingly unpopular toward the end of his presidency. Sabetzki would remain in office for nearly two decades, which were considered up to that point the most successful period for international ice hockey on all fronts.

Sabetzki's greatest achievement was ending the Canadian boycott of the World Championships and Olympic Games. The Canadians had boycotted these tournaments between 1970 and 1976 after the IIHF had refused to allow them to roster professional players at the World Championships from NHL teams that had not qualified for the Stanley Cup playoffs. President Sabetzki managed to find a compromise that resulted in the return of Canada to international events beginning in 1977. The pro players whose teams had been eliminated from the playoffs were allowed to compete and in exchange, Canada agreed to participate in the World Championships. They also waived their right to host any World Championships. The creation of the Canada Cup (a competition organized by the NHL in Canada every four years) was also part of the new agreement between the IIHF and North American professional hockey.

Walter Wasservogel became the first full-time general secretary of the IIHF in 1978, serving in the role until 1986.

The first official World Junior Championships for players under 20 years of age was held in 1977. Unofficial tournaments, which were not IIHF-sanctioned and teams were eligible to participate by invitation only, had been contested between 1974 and 1976. It began as a relatively obscure tournament, but soon grew in popularity, particularly in Canada. The most infamous WJC event was the Punch-up in Piestany in 1987, where a bench-clearing brawl between Canada and the Soviet Union resulted in the expulsion of both countries from the tournament.

Two new tournaments were introduced by the IIHF during the 1980s. The Asian Oceanic U18 Championship, which was held annually until 2002, was played for the first time in 1984. The first Women's European Championship was contested in 1989. It would be held a total of five times between 1989 and 1996.

== Since 1990 ==
The IIHF continued to grow in numbers during the 1980s and 1990s, both due to political events and the continued growth of hockey worldwide. The dissolution of the Soviet Union saw its membership transferred to Russia, and the addition of four ex-Soviet republics; Azerbaijan, Belarus, Kazakhstan, and Ukraine to the federation. In addition, the memberships of Estonia, Latvia, and Lithuania – all of which had initially joined the IIHF in the 1930s but were expelled following their annexation by the Soviet Union – were renewed. The breakup of Yugoslavia also resulted in an increase in membership. Croatia and Slovenia joined as new members, while the membership of the old Yugoslavia was transferred to FR Yugoslavia (which later became known as Serbia and Montenegro and still later dissolved into the independent republics of Serbia and Montenegro). When Czechoslovakia broke up, its membership rights were transferred to the Czech Republic and Slovakia was admitted as a new member. The influx of new members resulted in the IIHF increasing the size of the Group A tournament. It expanded from 8 teams to 12 in 1992 and from 12 to 16 in 1998.

The other new members to join the IIHF during the 1980s and 1990s were: Chinese Taipei (1983), Hong Kong (1983), Brazil (1984), Kuwait (1985), Mexico (1985), Greece (1987), India (1989), Thailand (1989), Israel (1991), Turkey (1991), Iceland (1992), Andorra (1995), Ireland (1996), Singapore (1996), Argentina (1998), Namibia (1998; withdrew from an IIHF membership and was removed entirely in 2017), Armenia (1999), Mongolia (1999), and Portugal (1999).

In June 1994, René Fasel was elected the President of the IIHF, succeeding Günther Sabetzki. He has served five consecutive terms as president. His most recent started in 2012 after he was re-elected at the IIHF General Congress in Tokyo, Japan. In March 1995, he helped negotiate an agreement so that NHL players could compete at the 1998 Winter Olympics in Nagano, Japan.

The first Women's World Championship was contested in 1990 in the Canadian capital of Ottawa.

IIHF logo (2005-2025)

Numerous other tournaments have been created by the IIHF during the 1990s and 2000s. The IIHF World U18 Championships (1999), the Women's Pacific Rim Championships (played in 1995 and 1996), the Continental Cup (1997; known as the Federation Cup from 1994 to 1996), the European Hockey League (contested from 1996 to 2000), and the Super Cup (contested from 1997 to 2000) were introduced during the 90s. The Euro Ice Hockey Challenge (2001), the European Women's Champions Cup (2004), the Elite Women's Hockey League (2004), the European Champions Cup (contested from 2005 to 2008), the World Women's U18 Championships (2008), the Victoria Cup (played in 2008 and 2009), the Champions Hockey League (operated during the 2008–09 season), and the Challenge Cup of Asia (2008) all were created during the 2000s.

The IIHF celebrated its 100th anniversary in 2008. As part of the celebrations, the 2008 World Championship was held in Canada for the first time (the tournament was co-hosted by the cities of Halifax and Quebec City). To commemorate the anniversary, the IIHF Centennial All-Star Team was chosen by votes.

The number of members continues to grow. Chile (2000), Bosnia and Herzegovina (2001), Liechtenstein (2001), North Macedonia (2001), the United Arab Emirates (2001), Macau (2005), Malaysia (2006), Moldova (2008), Georgia (2009), Kuwait (2009; had originally joined in 1985, but was expelled in 1992), Morocco (2010), Kyrgyzstan (2011), Jamaica (2012), Qatar (2012), Oman (2014), Turkmenistan (2015), Indonesia (2016), Nepal (2016), the Philippines (2016), Algeria (2019), Colombia (2019), Iran (2019), Lebanon (2019), and Uzbekistan (2019) all have joined since the turn of the millennium.

Namibia, which was an affiliate member of the IIHF until 2017, withdrew from an IIHF membership due to lack of ice hockey activities in the country.

The IIHF received widespread international criticism for holding the 2014 Men's Ice Hockey World Championships in Belarus because of the poor human rights record of the country. Several human rights organisations launched the "Don’t play with the dictator!" boycott campaign and there were appeals from the US Congress, German Parliament and the European Parliament. The IIHF again received criticism for planning to partly hold the 2021 Men's Ice Hockey World Championships in Belarus. In January 2021, the IIHF withdrew the 2021 World Championship from Minsk due to safety and security issues during the political unrest, besides the COVID-19 pandemic and decided to solely hold the tournament in Riga, Latvia.

On May 23, 2021 civilian Ryanair Flight 4978, which was enroute from Athens to Vilnius, was forced to land in Minsk and a passenger of that flight was detained. In protest, Latvian officials replaced the Belarusian state flag in Riga with the former flag associated with the Belarusian opposition groups, including at the 2021 IIHF World Championship display of flags. This was by order of Mayor of Riga Mārtiņš Staķis and Minister of Foreign Affairs of Latvia Edgars Rinkēvičs. The IIHF issued a statement protesting the replacement of the flag, and IIHF president René Fasel asked the mayor to remove the IIHF name, its flag and its symbols from such sites, or to restore the flag, insisting that the IIHF is an "apolitical sports organization". In response, Staķis said he would remove the IIHF flags.

On February 28, 2022, the IIHF suspended Russia and Belarus from participation in international play because of the 2022 Russian invasion of Ukraine.
