= Paul Loicq =

Belgian ice hockey administrator, referee and player (1888–1953)

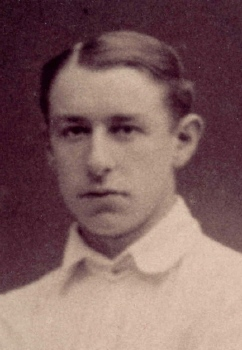
- Born: 11 August 1888; Brussels, Belgium
- Died: 26 March 1953 (aged 64); Sint-Genesius-Rode, Belgium
- Occupations: Ice hockey referee, lawyer and businessman
- Known for: Ligue Internationale de Hockey sur Glace president, Royal Belgian Ice Hockey Federation president
- Awards: Hockey Hall of Fame (1961); IIHF Hall of Fame (1997)
- Honors: Paul Loicq Award
Ice hockey career
- Hockey Hall of Fame, 1961 (Builder)
- Position: Right wing
- Played for: FPB Bruxelles, CDP Bruxelles
- National team: Belgium
- Playing career: 1906–1925
Medal record
Ice Hockey European Championships
Bronze medal – third place	1910 Les Avants	Belgium
Bronze medal – third place	1911 Berlin	Belgium
Bronze medal – third place	1914 Berlin	Belgium
LIHG Championships
Bronze medal – third place	1912 Brussels	Belgium
- Military career
- Allegiance: Belgium
- Branch: Belgian Army; Belgian Resistance
- Rank: Colonel
- Wars: World War I World War II

Paul Loicq (French pronunciation: [lojk]; 11 August 1888 – 26 March 1953) was a Belgian lawyer, businessman and ice hockey player, coach, referee and administrator. He played ice hockey for Belgium men's national ice hockey team and won four bronze medals from in 1910 to 1914. He was a leading supporter of the efforts to introduce ice hockey at the Olympic Games, and served on the organizing committee for ice hockey at the 1920 Summer Olympics. After playing in the 1920 Olympics he served as president of the Royal Belgian Ice Hockey Federation from 1920 to 1935, and as president of the Ligue Internationale de Hockey sur Glace (LIHG) from 1922 to 1947, which was later known as the International Ice Hockey Federation (IIHF). During his time as president the LIHG more than doubled its membership and welcomed the first national associations from Asia and Africa, and the LIHG began hosting its annual Ice Hockey World Championships in 1930. He was also an international ice hockey referee from 1924 to 1937 at the Olympic Games, the Ice Hockey World Championships and the Ice Hockey European Championships. He served in the Belgian Army during World War I and World War II, achieved the rank of colonel, and represented Belgium as legal counsel at the Nuremberg trials.

Loicq was posthumously inducted into the Hockey Hall of Fame in the builder's category in 1961. He was the first European to be inducted, and was credited as the main person who introduced hockey to the Olympics. He inducted into the inaugural class of the IIHF Hall of Fame in 1997, and was credited for growing the game of hockey in Europe and raising its worldwide profile. The IIHF established the Paul Loicq Award in 1998, given to recognize an individual for outstanding contributions to the development of international ice hockey.

== Early life and playing years ==
Loicq was born 11 August 1888 in Brussels, Belgium. (Note: Several birthdates are published for Paul Loicq. The most common is 11 August 1888, in Brussels, Belgium. Other published dates include 1 August 1888, and the year 1890.) He was a speed skater as a youth, and later adapted to playing hockey. He played as a right winger for FP Bruxelles from the 1905–06 to 1910–11 seasons, and then played for Cercle des Patineurs Bruxelles (CDP Bruxelles) from the 1911–12 to 1913–14 seasons. He played on the Belgium men's national ice hockey team at the Ice Hockey European Championships in the 1910, 1911, and 1914 competitions. The Belgians placed third and won a bronze medal in each of the three years he played. Loicq also played for the national team at the 1912 LIHG Championship and won bronze. He played in three consecutive Belgian Championships with CDP Bruxelles from 1912 to 1914, and was a national champion in 1914.

Loicq's ice hockey career went on hiatus during World War I. He resumed playing for CDP Bruxelles from the 1919–20 to 1922–23 seasons. He served as the player-coach for the Belgian national team in the winter of 1919–20, and was the team's captain in ice hockey at the 1920 Summer Olympics. Belgium played an international friendly with the Ice Skating Club de Paris, and lost its sole match at the Olympics by a 0–8 score to the Sweden men's national ice hockey team. Loicq returned to play with the Belgian national team in 1921, during an international match with Club des Sports d'Hiver de Paris in 1921, and made his final playing appearance with the team at the Ice Hockey European Championship 1925.

== Military and business career ==
Loicq graduated from university in Brussels as a lawyer. As a businessman, he was in charge of a company which produced medicinal cotton wool. He served in the Belgian Army during World War I, and earned a citation for bravery. He was a leader in the Belgian Resistance against the German occupation of Belgium during World War II, and rose to the rank of colonel. After the conclusion of the war, Loicq acted as legal representation for Belgium at the Nuremberg trials.

== Belgian sport administrator ==
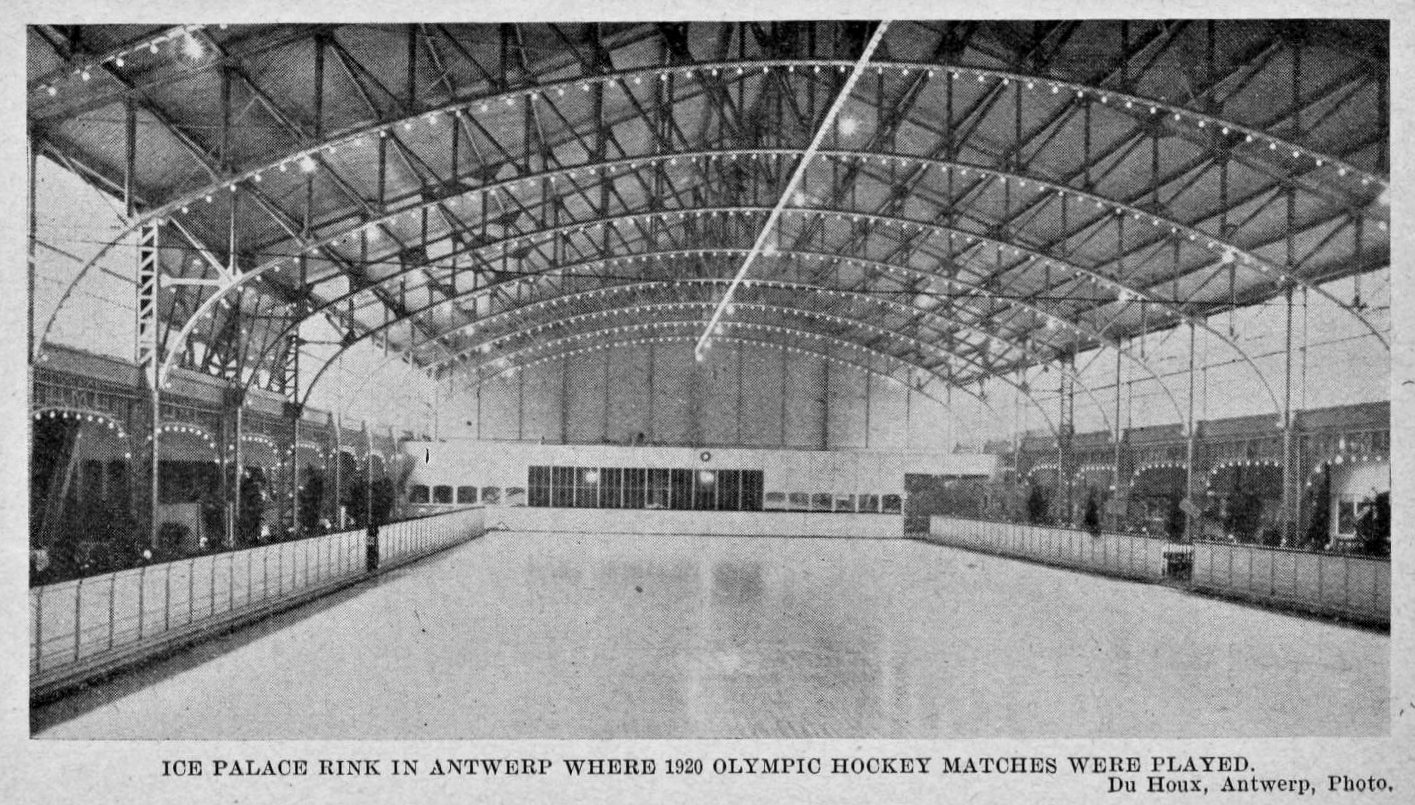
The Palais de Glace d'Anvers (pictured) hosted ice hockey at the 1920 Summer Olympics.

Loicq was actively involved in organization and management sports as an athlete. He served as president of the Skaters Club of Brussels, the Belgian Federation of Skaters and the Belgian League for Winter Sports. He was also a leading supporter of the efforts to introduce ice hockey at the Olympic Games. His efforts were rewarded in January 1920, when the choice was made to include ice hockey at the 1920 Summer Olympics. Five teams from Europe agreed to play along with Canada and the United States. The Palais de Glace d'Anvers in Antwerp hosted both hockey and the corresponding figure skating events. Loicq served on the Belgian organizing committee for the hockey tournament at the Olympics. The games used the Canadian ice hockey rules, and the Bergvall system to determine medal winning teams.

Loicq served as president of the Royal Belgian Ice Hockey Federation (RBIHF) from 1920 to 1935. He succeeded Henri Van den Bulcke, who was the founding president of the RBIHF. When the indoor ice rink in Brussels closed in 1923, the RBIHF was left with only the rink in Antwerp for its indoor matches. Loicq served as head coach of Belgium at the Ice Hockey European Championship 1927. He led Belgium to a silver medal, and a second-place finish to the Austria men's national ice hockey team. His team included captain Willy Kreitz as the best player of the tournament, and Pierre Van Reysschoot. Belgium was given the fair play trophy, which was awarded for the first time in 1927. Belgium lost the ice palace in Antwerp due to a fire in 1928. Loicq later arranged Belgian Championships on frozen ponds until three new rinks opened in Brussels between 1933 and 1935.

Loicq also served as vice-president of the Belgian Olympic Committee, and confirmed that Belgium would participate in the 1932 Winter Olympics hosted in Lake Placid, New York. During the bid process for the 1932 Winter Olympics, Loicq abstained in discussions on the downsizing of the Olympic event schedule.

== LIHG president ==
Loicq was elected president of the Ligue Internationale de Hockey sur Glace (LIHG) in 1922 to succeed Max Sillig. Loicq served in the role for 25 years until 1947 during a period of growth for the LIHG. (Note: Several sources indicate that Loicq was elected LIHG president in 1927, however the IIHF web site states 1922 in its history, and multiple other sources indicate he was president from 1922 to 1947.) The federation expanded from 11 national member associations based in Europe and North America to 27 members globally in 1947, (Note: The number of associations is counted as per the history on the IIHF web site. The number of members is also cited by national association at the list of members of the International Ice Hockey Federation.) including Japan in 1930 as the first member from Asia, and South Africa in 1937 as the first member from Africa.

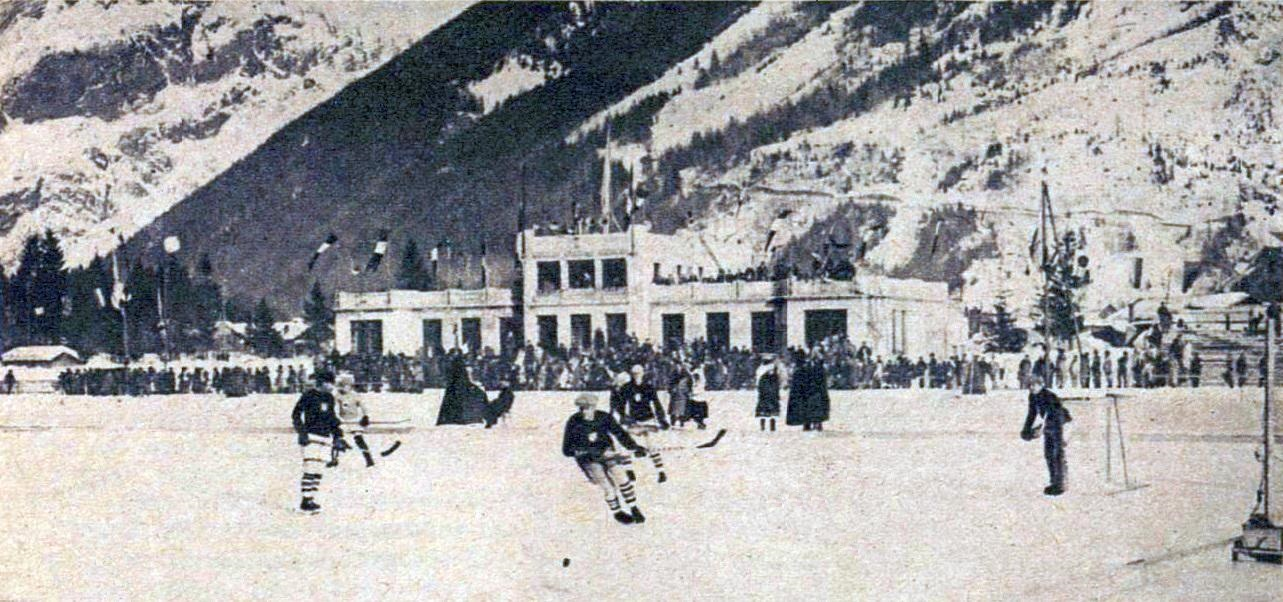
Chamoix, France, hosted both ice hockey at the 1924 Winter Olympics (pictured) and the 1930 World Ice Hockey Championships.

In 1924, Loicq and the LIHG assisted in organizing a hockey tournament at the International Winter Sports Week held in Chamonix, France. The International Olympic Committee retroactively recognized this event as ice hockey at the 1924 Winter Olympics. The games were played outside on natural ice, and used a two-tier round-robin format to replace the Bergvall system. In 1928, the LIHG decided that ice hockey at the 1928 Winter Olympics would also determine the European Championship, instead of hosting a separate event. The 1928 event included 11 teams, the most number of participants at the time. Sweden won the silver medal at the Olympics, and were crowned European champions at the same time. After the increased participation at the Olympic Games, the LIHG congress decided that Ice Hockey World Championships would be hosted annually starting in 1930. The World Championships also doubled as the European Championships thereafter. The 1930 World Ice Hockey Championships was the first annual event, and was scheduled to play outdoors in Chamonix, France. The natural ice melted and the event relocated to indoor venues in Berlin and Vienna for the final matches.

Loicq had several disagreements with the planning of ice hockey at the 1932 Winter Olympics. He stated that "according to the Olympic statutes it is the International and not the National Federation which is in charge of organizing the Games. It would be preferable that the harmony should be restored between the International Federation and the American Ice Hockey Federation". The International Society of Olympic Historians felt the dispute came from the Amateur Athletic Union controlling the selection of American amateur teams for the Olympics on behalf of the United States Olympic Committee, and the ensuing power struggle with the LIHG. There was also a disagreement in the number of players on hockey teams. The LIHG stated it should be 14, whereas the organizing committee published 13 players. When the 1932 tournament was played, only four teams participated, with only two European associations making the trip due to difficulties of raising funds to pay for long-distance travel during the Great Depression. The European teams instead played at the Ice Hockey European Championship 1932 with nine teams participating. The 1932 event was the final time that the European Championships were held separately from the World Championships.

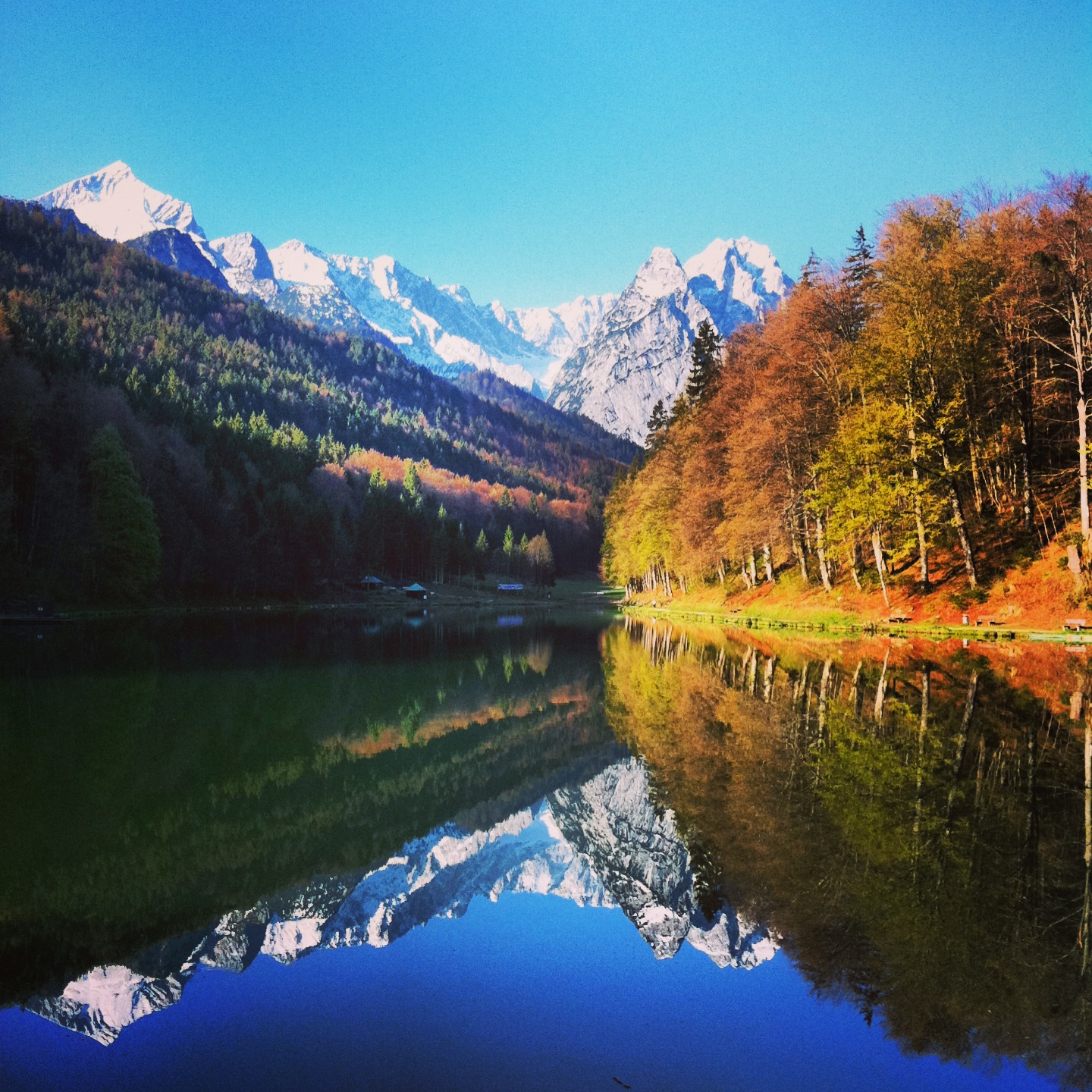
The Riessersee (pictured) hosted a portion of the matches in ice hockey at the 1936 Winter Olympics.

Ice hockey at the 1936 Winter Olympics was hosted in Garmisch-Partenkirchen, Germany, with games being played at the partially-covered Olympia-Kunsteisstadion on artificial ice, and on natural ice at Riessersee. The number of participating nations rebounded from the 1932 Olympics with an increase to 15. The tournament saw the Great Britain men's national ice hockey team which included British-Canadian dual citizens capture the gold medal, over the defending champion Canada men's national ice hockey team which won silver. Loicq mediated two protests by the Canadian Amateur Hockey Association (CAHA) for the hockey tournament. The CAHA had originally protested the use of two players by Great Britain which were suspended by the CAHA. Loicq agreed that the suspended players could not be used in the Olympics, but Canada relented on its protest on the eve of the Olympics due to international pressure, and not being aware that Loicq had agreed to the suspensions. He later called an emergency meeting regarding the format of the finals protested by Canada, which was denied in a vote of delegates. He later denied accusations from Canadian Amateur Hockey Association president E. A. Gilroy that the rules were changed during the event.

In February 1937, the LIHG passed resolutions in wake of discussions began during the previous Olympics. The LIHG decided to award future World Championships only to countries with an artificial ice rink available for the games. Exhibition games between professional and amateur teams were now allowed, and national associations were given control over sanctioning events for both amateurs and professionals in their respective countries. The LIHG also allowed up to two professionals on an amateur team in international competition, and that a player must represent his country of birth unless he was a five-year resident of the adoptive country he wished to play for. Loicq felt that the resolutions were passed since member associations did not want to play against multiple teams in the British Empire with Canadian-trained players. He was also expected to report on investigations into professionalism in the amateur game at the World Championships. In 1937, the LIHG decided to host World Championships only in non-Olympic years, and to recognize the Olympic ice hockey tournament as the World Championship for that year.

The LIHG did not host any World Championships or Olympic tournaments from 1939 to 1946 due to World War II, and had not held a congress in seven years until meeting in Brussels in 1946. During the war, Loicq permitted W. G. Hardy of the CAHA and the International Ice Hockey Association to continue negotiating working agreements with the Amateur Hockey Association of the United States. The World Championship resumed in 1947, and Loicq completed one final year as president of the LIHG. He resigned during the 1947 congress after 25 years as president, and was succeeded by Fritz Kraatz from Switzerland.

== Hockey referee career ==
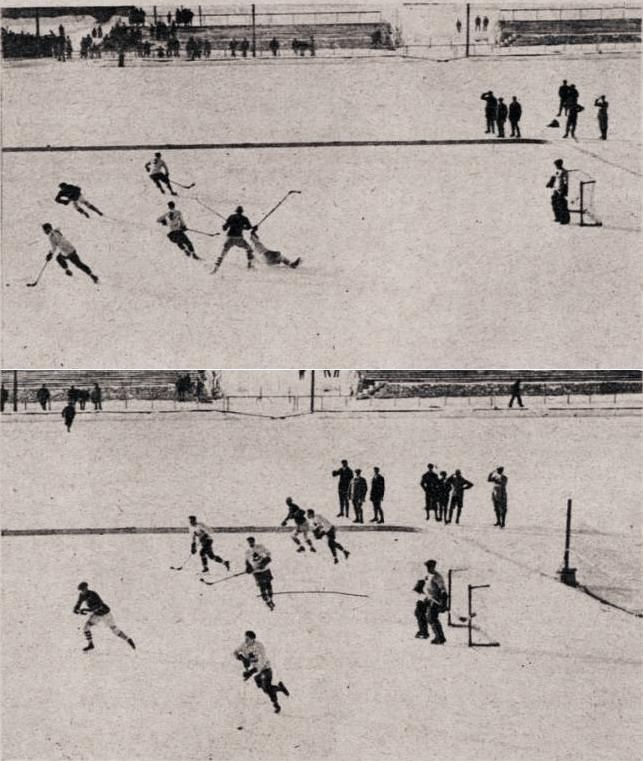
Loicq officiated the match between Canada and the United States at the 1924 Winter Olympics.

Loicq was an international ice hockey referee from 1924 to 1937, which coincided with his presidency of the LIHG. During this time he officiated at the Winter Olympic Games, Ice Hockey World Championships and the Ice Hockey European Championships. Some notable games for Loicq at the Olympics include the decisive match in ice hockey at the 1924 Winter Olympics, where Canada defeated the United States for the gold medal; the match between Canada and Sweden in ice hockey at the 1928 Winter Olympics; and the match between Canada and Austria in ice hockey at the 1936 Winter Olympics. He worked at least 60 international matches during his career, and founded the International College of Referees to grow the talent pool of officials.

== Personal life and death ==
Loicq's son Gaston played as a defenceman for CDP Bruxelles during the 1939–40 season. Paul Loicq died 26 March 1953, in Sint-Genesius-Rode, Belgium.

== Legacy and honors ==
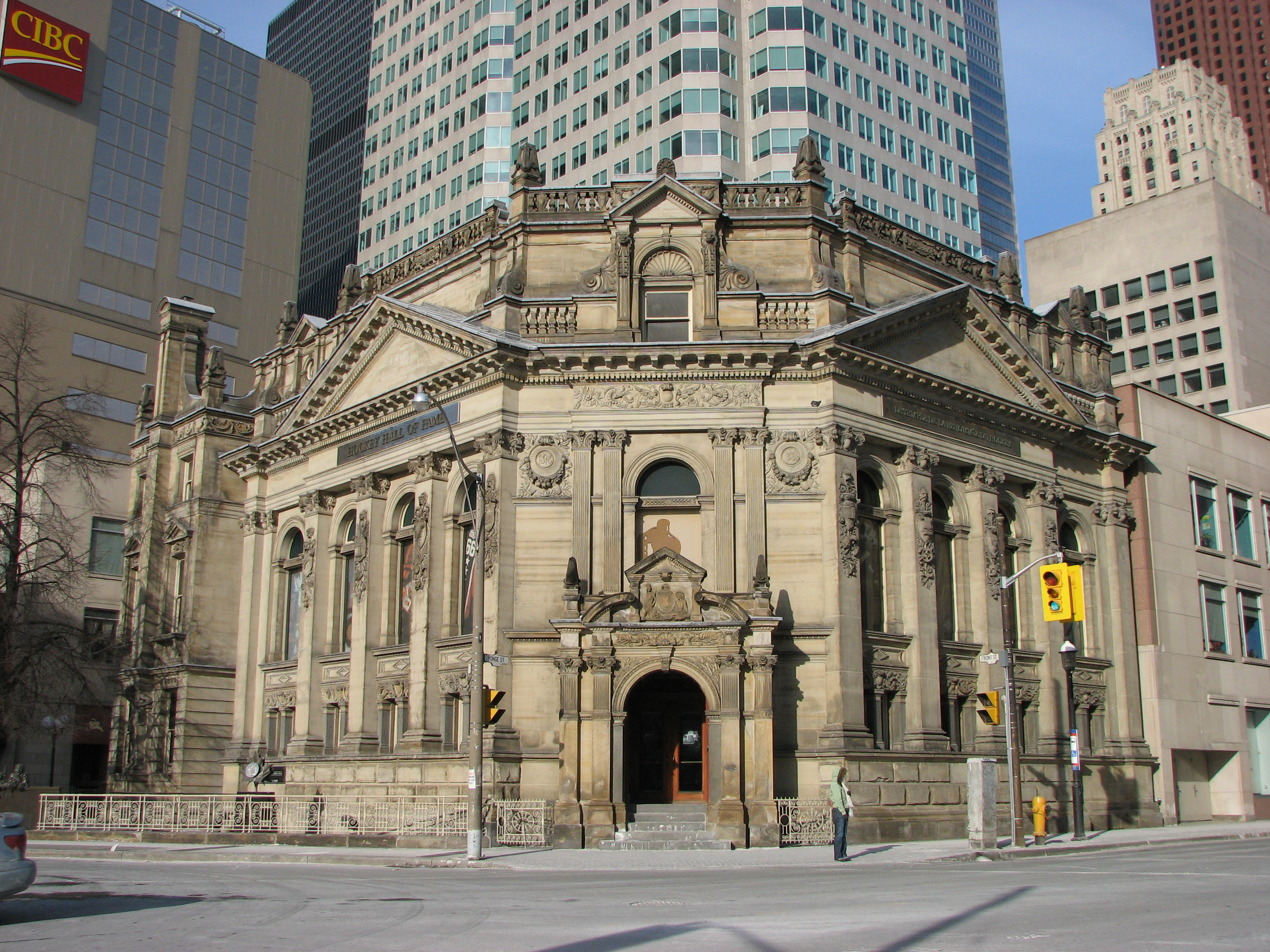
Loicq was inducted into the Hockey Hall of Fame (pictured) in 1961, which also hosts the IIHF Hall of Fame to which he was inducted in 1997.

Loicq was named honorary president of the LIHG upon his resignation in 1947. He was posthumously voted into the Hockey Hall of Fame in 1960, and the Belgian Olympic Committee presented his widow with the Hall of Fame crest. He was formally inducted into the Hall of Fame's builder category in 1961. He became the first European to be inducted into the Hockey Hall of Fame, and is the only Belgian to be inducted as of 2019. Journalist Andy O'Brien said that, "Loicq personifies the justification for the shrine". Both O'Brien and the Canadian Press credited Loicq as the main person who introduced hockey to the Olympics.

Loicq and 30 others were honored by the International Ice Hockey Federation (IIHF) in the inaugural class of inductees into the IIHF Hall of Fame in 1997. He was posthumously inducted at a ceremony in Helsinki, during the 1997 Men's World Ice Hockey Championships. He was inducted into the builder's category, and is the only inductee from Belgium as of 2019. The IIHF Hall of Fame credits Loicq for growing the game of hockey in Europe and raising its worldwide profile through the foundation of the Ice Hockey World Championships and the Olympic Games competitions. The Hockey Hall of Fame states that Loicq was a "dedicated organizer" who spent a lifetime involved in the game, was "respected for his project management skills" and a "visionary" who was the "brain on the national and international scene".

The IIHF established the Paul Loicq Award in 1998 to further recognize his legacy. The award is given to recognize an individual for outstanding contributions to the development of international ice hockey, and is handed out at the same time as the hall of fame induction.

Royal Belgian Ice Hockey Federation president Pascal Nuchelmans said in 2013, that the federation wants to establish its own hall of fame which would include prominent recognition of Loicq. Nuchelmans also stated, "Loicq is the start of everything. He put Belgian hockey on the map", and that "Loicq contributed to the great strides that were made in increasing the sport throughout Europe in the 20th century".

== Notes ==
Preceded by Henri Van den Bulcke	President of the Belgian Ice Hockey Federation; 1920–1935	Succeeded by Paul De Schrijver
Preceded by Max Sillig	President of the Ligue Internationale de Hockey sur Glace; 1922–1947	Succeeded by Fritz Kraatz
