= Coupe de Chamonix =

International ice hockey tournament held in France

The Coupe de Chamonix was an international ice hockey tournament held in Chamonix, France, from 1909 to 1914.

== History ==
The 1909 tournament consisted of five teams. Prince's Ice Hockey Club won the tournament with a perfect 4–0–0 record. Club des Patineurs de Paris finished second, and Club des Patineurs Lausanne finished third. Federation des Patineurs de Belgique finished fourth, and Students Prague finished fifth and last. It was played from January 23 to 25, 1909.

The second edition was held from January 16 to 18, 1910, and only three teams participated. Club des Patineurs de Paris won the tournament, Berliner Schlittschuhclub finished second, and Brussels Ice Hockey Club finished third and last.

The third Coupe de Chamonix was held January 16–19, 1911. The Oxford Canadians, who made their debut at the tournament, finished first with a perfect 4–0–0 record. Berliner Schlittschuchlub finished second, Club des Patineurs de Paris finished third, Brussels Ice Hockey Club finished fourth, and Prince's Ice Hockey Club finished fifth and last.

The 1912 tournament was held January 15–17. Club des Patineurs de Paris won the tournament with a 3–0–0 record, which included a 4–0 win over the defending champions, the Oxford Canadians. The Canadians finished second, Berliner Schlittschuhclub finished third, and SK Slavia Prague finished fourth.

The 1914 Coupe de Chamonix was also known as the third LIHG Championship.

== Results ==
Year	(gold) Gold	(silver) Silver	(bronze) Bronze
1909	(United Kingdom) Princes Ice Hockey Club	(France) Club des Patineurs de Paris	(Switzerland) Club des Patineurs Lausanne
1910	(France) Club des Patineurs de Paris	(Germany) Berliner Schlittschuhclub	(Belgium) Brussels Ice Hockey Club
1911	(Canada) Oxford Canadians	(Germany) Berliner Schlittschuhclub	(France) Club des Patineurs de Paris
1912	(France) Club des Patineurs de Paris	(Canada) Oxford Canadians	(Germany) Berliner Schlittschuhclub
