= Nicrophorus bipunctatus =

Nicrophorus bipunctatus may refer to the beetles:

- Nicrophorus germanicus, misidentified in 1880 by Kraatz as a new variant of N. germanicus
- Nicrophorus vestigator, misidentified in 1914 by Portevin as a new variant of N. vestigator
