= Kraatz =

Kraatz is a surname. Notable people with the surname include:

- Ernst Gustav Kraatz (1831–1909), German entomologist
- Fritz Kraatz (1906–1992), Swiss ice hockey player
- Paul Kraatz (1863–1926), Finnish politician
- Victor Kraatz, MSC (born 1971), Canadian figure skater
