= Philip Vassar Hunter =

British engineer and businessman

Philip Vassar Hunter CBE (c. 1883 – 22 October 1956) was a British engineer and businessman. Born in 1883 in Emneth Hungate, Norfolk, he attended Wisbech Grammar School and was later educated at Faraday House, an engineering college in Charing Cross, London.

During the First World War, he served as the Engineering Director in the experiments and research section of the anti-submarine division of the Naval Staff and was appointed a CBE in January 1920. In the Second World War, he invented the buoyant cable, which significantly contributed to the defeat of the magnetic mine. In 1933, he held the position of president of the Institution of Electrical Engineers, of which he became on honorary fellow in 1951, recognized for his "outstanding service to the electrical industry and to the institution".

He served as president of the British Ice Hockey Association from 1934 to 1958 and was responsible for hiring John F "Bunny" Ahearne as the Manager of the Great Britain national ice hockey team in 1934. Under his leadership, the team achieved the remarkable feat of winning the gold medal at the 1936 Winter Olympics. He died at the age of 73 at his home in Addington, Surrey.

== Footnotes ==
Preceded by Edgar Walford Marchant	President of the IEE; 1933	Succeeded by William Mundell Thornton OBE
Preceded by Major B M "Peter" Patton	President of the BIHA; 1934–58	Succeeded by Sir Victor Tait KBE
