= 1912 Coupe de Chamonix =

The 1912 Coupe de Chamonix was the fourth edition of the Coupe de Chamonix, an international ice hockey tournament. It was held from January 15-17, 1912, in Chamonix, France. Club des Patineurs de Paris from France won the tournament.

== Results ==
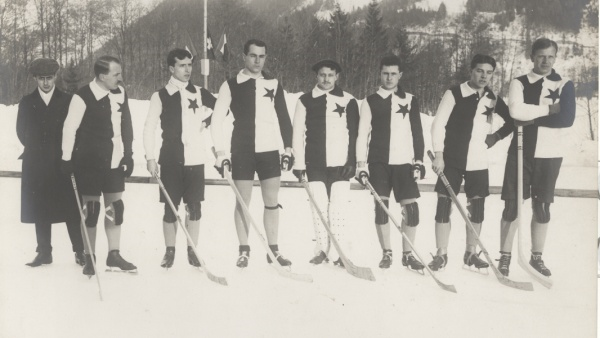
Hockey team Slavia Prague.

=== Final Table ===
Pl.	Team	GP	W	T	L	Goals	Pts
1.	(France) Club des Patineurs de Paris	3	3	0	0	10:1	6
2.	(Canada) Oxford Canadians	3	2	0	1	26:8	4
3.	(Germany) Berliner Schlittschuhclub	3	1	0	2	7:5	2
4.	(Bohemia) SK Slavia Prague	3	0	0	3	3:32	0
