= 1913 LIHG Championship =

The 1913 LIHG Championship was the second congress of the LIHG Championships, an international ice hockey competition. The tournament was held from January 22–24, 1913, in St. Moritz, Switzerland. Germany won the championship, Great Britain finished second, and France finished third.

== Results ==
=== Final Table ===
Pl.	Team	GP	W	T	L	Goals	Pts
1.	Germany	4	3	0	1	24:5	6
2.	Great Britain	4	3	0	1	14:3	6
3.	France	4	2	0	2	12:6	6
4.	Bohemia	4	1	0	3	5:13	2
5.	Switzerland	4	0	0	4	3:31	0
