= Royal Belgian Ice Hockey Federation =

Ice hockey governing body in Belgium

Belgium
- Association name: Royal Belgian Ice Hockey Federation
- IIHF Code: BEL
- IIHF membership: 1908
- President: Marc Verlinden
- IIHF men's ranking: 36th
- IIHF women's ranking: 26th

The Royal Belgian Ice Hockey Federation (RBIHF) is the Belgian ice hockey federation, known in Dutch as the Koninklijke Belgische IJshockey Federatie (KBIJF) and in French as the Fédération Royale Belge de Hockey sur Glace (FRBHG). It is responsible for administering ice hockey in Belgium, from the national team to the local leagues to youth development.

== History ==
The Royal Belgian Ice Hockey Federation was formed in 1912 by Henry Van den Bulck. He became its first president remained in the position until 1920. It was known as the Belgian Ice Hockey Federation until 1973 when the Royal prefix was added to the name.

=== List of presidents ===
President	Took office	Left office
Henri Van den Bulcke	1912	1920
Paul Loicq	1920	1935
Paul De Schrijver	1935	1936
Jean Loicq	1936	1936
Paul De Schrijver	1936	1937
Henry Matthyssens	1937	1939
Paul De Weerdt	1939	1945
Gusty De Backer	1945	1949
Carlos Van den Driessche	1949	1951
Albert Delrez	1951	1953
Carlos Van den Driessche	1953	1955
Axel Janssen	1955	1959
Jimmy Greaffe	1959	1960
Carlos Van den Driessche	1960	1965
Paul Schwegerynen	1965	1972
Emile Delvignette	1972	1980
Adolf Cuypers	1980	1991
Chris Clement	1991	2008
Pascal Nuchelmans	2008	2021
Marc Verlinden	2024	-

== Leagues and levels ==
The following leagues exist in Belgium:

- CEHL (Central European Hockey League)
- Division 1
- Division 2
- Division 3 (Recreational)
- Under 18
- Under 16
- Under 14
- Under 12
- Under 10
- Under 8

The RBIHF also organizes friendlies.

== National teams ==
Belgium has 5 national ice hockey teams:

- Men's senior
- Men's junior
- Men's under-18
- Women's senior
- Women's under-18
