= Carlos Vandendriessche =

Belgian ice hockey player and rower

Personal information
- Born: Carlos Urbain Anna Stella Henri Vandendriessche; 31 August 1901 Brussels, Belgium
- Died: 14 May 1972 (aged 70)
- Height: 188 cm (6 ft 2 in)
- Weight: 109 kg (240 lb)

Sport
- Sport: Rowing, ice hockey
- Club: CRB, Bruxelles; BIHC, Bruxelles
Medal record
Representing Belgium
Men's ice hockey
Ice Hockey European Championships
Bronze medal – third place	1924 Milan	Team
Men's rowing
European Rowing Championships
Bronze medal – third place	1929 Bydgoszcz	Single sculls

Carlos Urbain Anna Stella Henri Vandendriessche (31 August 1901 – 14 May 1972) was a Belgian ice hockey player and rower. As a hockey player he won a bronze medal at the 1924 European Championships and finished seventh and thirteenth at the 1924 and 1936 Winter Olympics, respectively.

As a rower he competed in the coxless pairs at the 1928 Summer Olympics, together with the fellow ice hockey player Philippe Van Volckxsom, but failed to reach the final. He won a bronze medal in the double sculls with Louis Strauwen at the 1929 European Rowing Championships.

Vandendriessche served as the president of the Royal Belgian Ice Hockey Federation in 1949–1951, 1953–1955 and 1960–1965.

== See also ==
- List of athletes who competed in both the Summer and Winter Olympic games
