= 1911 Coupe de Chamonix =

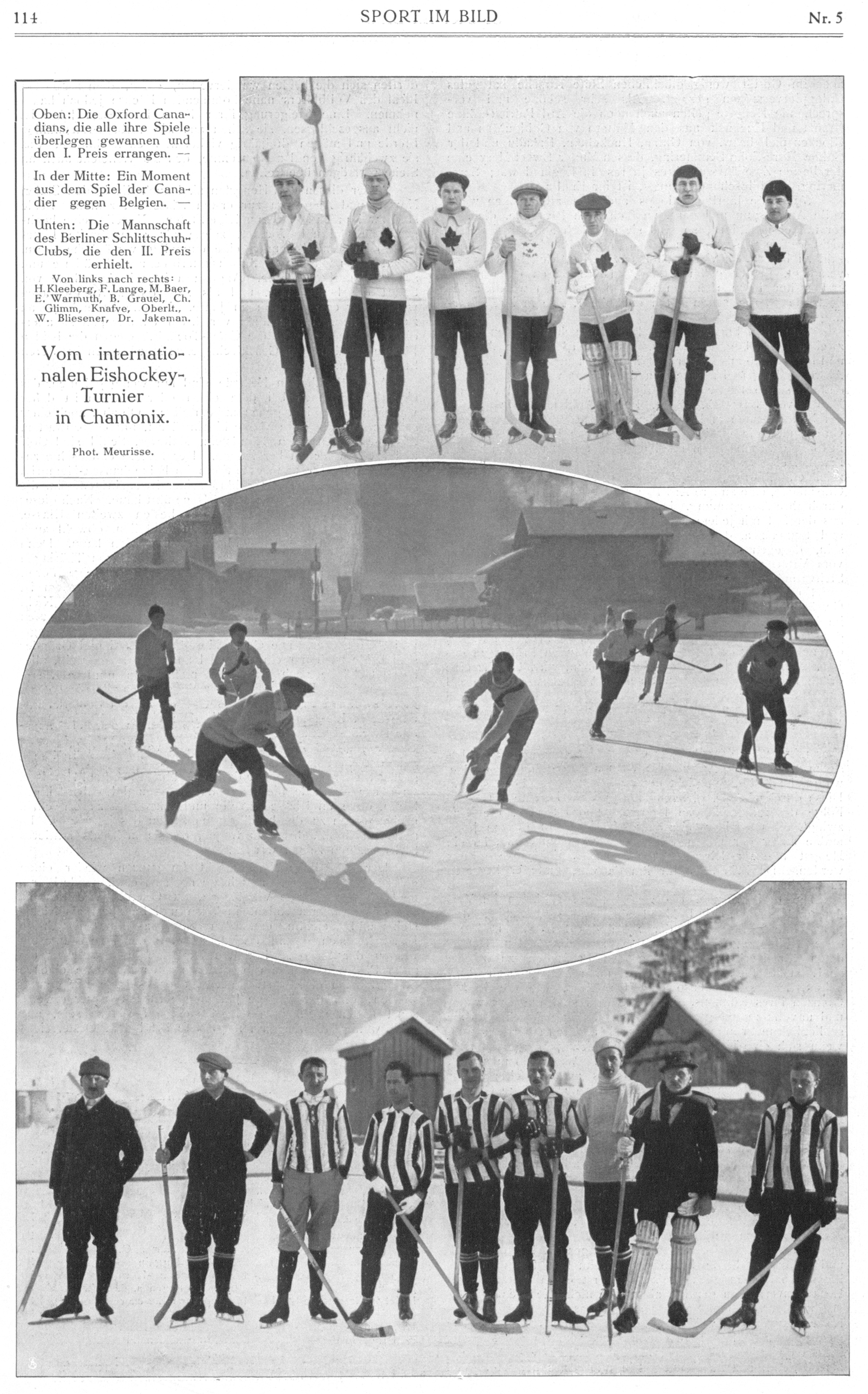
1911 Coupe de Chamonix

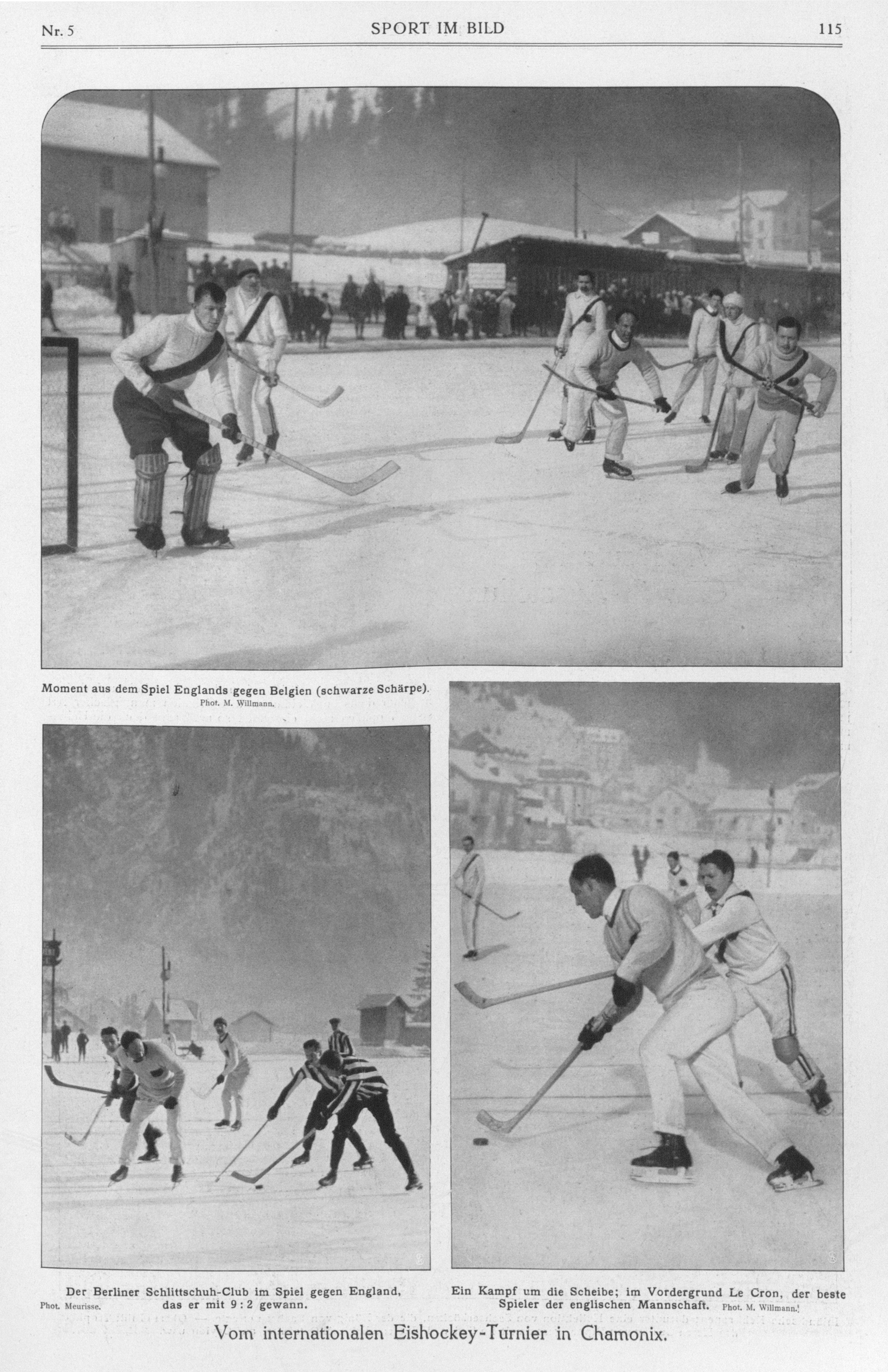
1911 Coupe de Chamonix

The 1911 Coupe de Chamonix was the third edition of the Coupe de Chamonix, an international ice hockey tournament. It was held from January 16-19, 1911, in Chamonix, France. The Oxford Canadians won the tournament.

== Results ==
=== Final Table ===
Pl.	Team	GP	W	T	L	Goals	Pts
1.	(Canada) Oxford Canadians	4	4	0	0	42:3	8
2.	(Germany) Berliner Schlittschuhclub	4	3	0	1	20:22	6
3.	(France) Club des Patineurs de Paris	4	2	0	2	10:8	4
4.	(Belgium) Brussels Ice Hockey Club	4	1	0	3	11:26	2
5.	(United Kingdom) Princes Ice Hockey Club	4	0	0	4	4:28	0
