= 1910 Coupe de Chamonix =

The 1910 Coupe de Chamonix was the second edition of the Coupe de Chamonix, an international ice hockey tournament. It was held from January 16-18, 1910, in Chamonix, France. Club des Patineurs de Paris from France won the tournament.

== Results ==
=== Final Table ===
Pl.	Team	GP	W	T	L	Goals	Pts
1.	(France) Club des Patineurs de Paris	2	2	0	0	10:2	4
2.	(Germany) Berliner Schlittschuhclub	2	1	0	1	7:4	2
3.	(Belgium) Brussels Ice Hockey Club	2	0	0	2	0:11	4
