= Peter Patton (ice hockey) =

English ice hockey player and administrator (1876–1939)

- Born: 5 March 1876 London, England
- Died: 10 April 1939 (aged 63) Tiverton, England
- Position: Defence
- Played for: Princes; London Lions
- National team: Great Britain
- Playing career: 1897–1931

Major Bethune Minet "Peter" Patton (5 March 1876 – 10 April 1939) was an English ice hockey player and administrator. He is credited with bringing ice hockey to United Kingdom and helping to spread the sport to Europe. He was a founding member of the International Ice Hockey Federation (IIHF) in 1908 and was the inaugural president of the British Ice Hockey Association (BIHA) in 1914. He is a member of both the IIHF Hall of Fame and the British Ice Hockey Hall of Fame.

Patton had a public school education at Winchester and Wellington and he is believed to have learned to skate whilst holidaying in Switzerland.

== Early life ==
He was the son of Henry Bethune Patton (1835-1915) CB, a Colonel in the British Army with local rank of Brigadier-General, and his second wife Georgina Emma Minet (1845-1918). The name Bethune came from an ancestress, Mary Bethune, who had married Henry Patton in 1749. One of his uncles was General Walter Douglas Phillips Patton-Bethune.

== Military career ==
From a military family, his initial profession was as a soldier. He served with the 3rd Somerset Regiment and gained the rank of Major with attachments to the Royal Army Service Corps. During the First World War, Patton served in France between September 1914 and May 1916. He was also attached to the Serbian Army and was awarded their Order of the White Eagle.

In July 1919 after returning home from the war, Patton was attached to the Serbs working in historical records of motor units. Patton retired from the army in 1921.

== Ice hockey career ==
=== Playing ===
Peter Patton
Medal record

Men's ice hockey

European Championships
Gold medal – first place	1910	Great Britain

Patton started a form of ice hockey in 1897 at the newly opened Prince's Skating Club when he formed the Princes Ice Hockey Club. With the help of some Canadian expats, he established a more recognisable form of ice hockey at the club in 1902. In 1903 he formed and became president of a five team league, the first league in Great Britain or Europe. On 24 January 1904 he played in the first game in Europe when Princes played a local team in Lyons which Princes won 2–0.

Princes, with Patton as their captain, played in the first European tournament in October 1908 which was held in Berlin. In 1910, Patton led the Princes team to the gold medal as they represented Great Britain at the inaugural European championships. Both before and after the First World War, Patton led the Princes team in many European tournaments, this included a silver medal finish at the 1913 championships held in St. Moritz, Switzerland.

Patton was again a member of the Great Britain team at the 1924 Winter Olympics. However, he was the substitute Goaltender at the tournament and did not see any ice time. Patton made his final appearance for the national team on 4 April 1930 when he was 54 years old. He finally retired while playing for the London Lions on 13 October 1931.

=== Administration ===
Helping to form the IIHF in 1908, Patton served as the vice-president on three separate occasions between 1910 and 1924 and he was briefly the president of the IIHF in 1914. Also in 1914, Patton was the inaugural president of the BIHA, a position he held until 1934 when he was succeeded by Philip Vassar Hunter CBE.

=== Legacy ===
After retiring from playing, Patton was elected as vice-president to first Streatham and then Wembley Lions in 1934. He was president of the short-lived team, Public Schools Ice Hockey Club.

He presented two trophies in his name – the Patton Cup – one which has been played for since 1927 in the Ice Hockey Varsity Match between the Cambridge and Oxford University Ice Hockey Clubs and the other which was awarded to the winners of the first British Championship from 1930 following the formation of the English League.

In October 1936 he wrote the book Ice Hockey which chronicled the early years of the sport in Great Britain.

Patton was inducted to the British Ice Hockey Hall of Fame in 1950, and into the IIHF Hall of Fame in 2002.

The Patton Conference in the Elite Ice Hockey League is named in Patton's honour.

== Other sports ==
Besides ice hockey, Patton was a prolific sportsman in ice dancing, canoeing and punting which he did on the River Thames. He also enjoyed skiing and was a founding member of the International Bobsleigh and Tobogganing Federation in 1923.

== Family ==
In August 1904 in St Pancras, London, describing himself as a civil engineer, he married Florence Adeline Winifred Lloyd-Worrall (1872-1937), but they parted without having had any children in 1911, when he was running a garage in Bray, Berkshire, and she sued for divorce. This was granted in 1912 and she had two further husbands.

Preceded by inaugural	President of the BIHA; 1914–1934	Succeeded by Philip Vassar Hunter CBE
Preceded by Henri Van den Bulcke	President of the IIHF; 1914	Succeeded by Louis Magnus
