= René Fasel =

Swiss ice hockey administrator

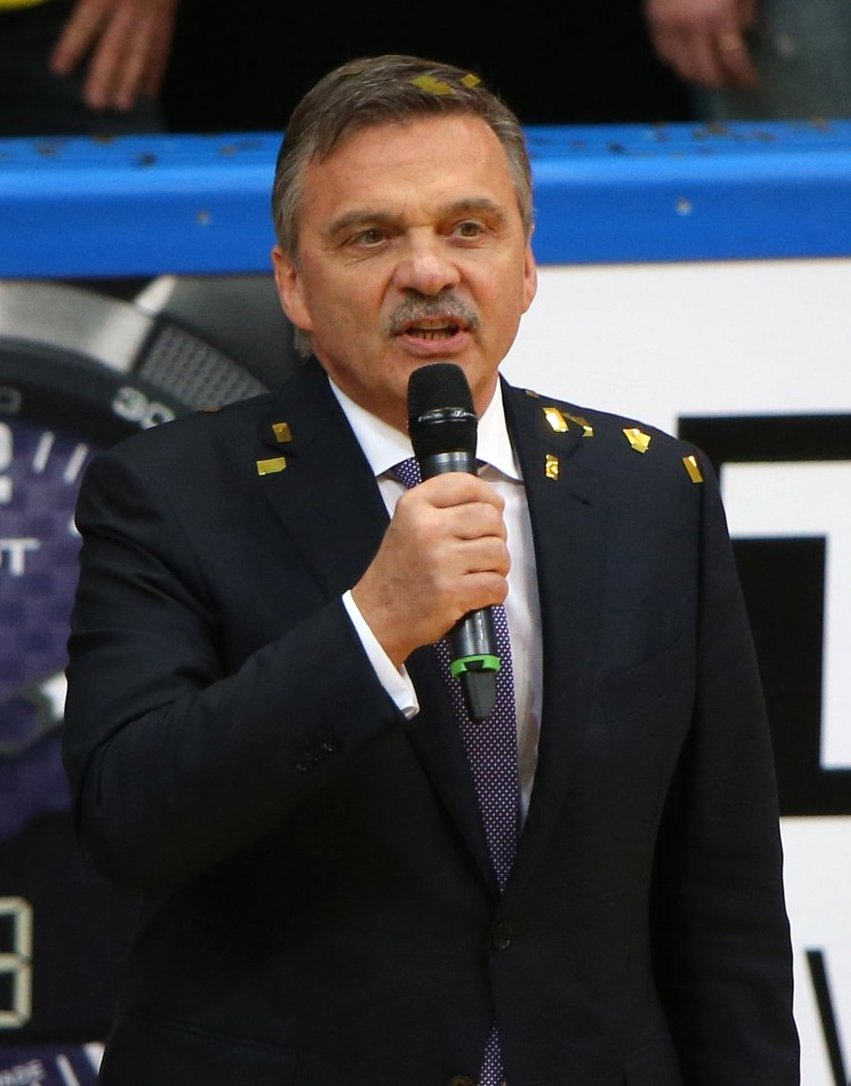
- Fasel in 2016
- Born: 6 February 1950 (age 76); Fribourg, Switzerland
- Education: Doctor of Dental Surgery
- Occupation: Ice hockey administrator
- Known for: International Ice Hockey Federation president, International Olympic Committee executive, Swiss Ice Hockey Federation president
- Honors: Legion of Honour (2004); Order of Friendship of Peoples (2011); IIHF Hall of Fame (2021)

René Fasel (born 6 February 1950) is a Swiss-Russian retired ice hockey administrator. He served as president of the International Ice Hockey Federation (IIHF) from 1994 to 2021. He started his ice hockey career as a player for HC Fribourg-Gottéron, in 1960, and became a referee in 1972. He became president of the Swiss Ice Hockey Federation in 1985, then was elected president of the International Ice Hockey Federation in 1994. He also became an International Olympic Committee member and was elected to its executive board. Fasel was inducted into the IIHF Hall of Fame in 2021.

== Early career ==
Born in Fribourg, Switzerland, Fasel started his playing career with the Swiss league team HC Fribourg-Gottéron in 1960. He remained with the team until 1972 and retired to become a referee. He remained a referee until 1982 and officiated 37 international matches. In 1982 he became the Chairman of the Swiss Ice Hockey League referees' commission. In 1985, he became president of the Schweizerischer Eishockeyverband, Switzerland's governing body for ice hockey. He was elected to the IIHF council the following year and served as head of the Referee and the Marketing Committees.

== IIHF president ==
In June 1994, Fasel was elected the President of the IIHF, succeeding Günther Sabetzki, winning the election by three votes over Kai Hietarinta of Finland. He served four consecutive terms as president, with his final term starting in May 2008 when he was unopposed in his re-election attempt. He sought a stronger relationship with the National Hockey League (NHL), the major professional ice hockey league of North America. In March 1995, he helped negotiate an agreement so that NHL players could compete at the 1998 Winter Olympics in Nagano, Japan. He vowed to "work day and night" to help negotiate an agreement that will see NHL players participate in the 2014 Winter Olympics. He is against fighting in ice hockey, describing it as "Neanderthal behavior".

He became a member of the Swiss Olympic Association in 1992, and a member of the International Olympic Committee in 1995. He was the first representative of ice hockey. As an IOC member, he was chairman of the Association of International Olympic Winter Sports Federations (AIOWF), and chairman of the Coordination Commission for the 2010 Winter Olympics. In May 2008, Fasel was nominated to replace Ottavio Cinquanta as the winter sports representative on the IOC's executive board. He was named to the board on 7 August at the 120th IOC Session held before the 2008 Summer Olympics and served an eight-year term until 2016, when replaced by Gian-Franco Kasper.

In a conflict of interest, Fasel assisted a friend in securing a contract for overseeing the IIHF's television and marketing rights. In April 2010, IOC only reprimanded Fasel, a lighter sentence than in other similar cases.

Fasel spoke at the World Hockey Summit in 2010, and discussed the National Hockey League (NHL) presence in Europe and in ice hockey at the Olympic Games, and was defensive of European hockey. He was against NHL expansion plans into Europe, and envisioned a European professional league, where the champion would play the Stanley Cup winner for a world title. He sought to keep NHL participation at the Winter Olympics due to its profitability and exposure for international hockey.

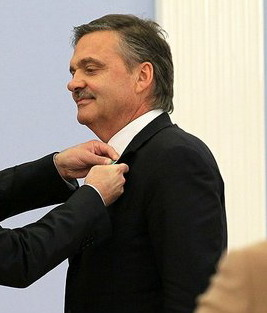
Fasel in 2011

Fasel was awarded the Order of Friendship by Russian president Dmitry Medvedev in 2011.

In January 2021, Fasel was criticized for meeting with Alexander Lukashenko regarding the 2021 Men's Ice Hockey World Championships during the 2020–2021 Belarusian protests. Fasel replied that the meeting was solely to discuss the World Championships, and that they had known each other from playing ice hockey together.

Fasel stepped down as IIHF president on 25 September 2021, and was inducted into the IIHF Hall of Fame on the same day. He was succeeded as IIHF president by French Ice Hockey Federation president, Luc Tardif. He is still one of the life and honorary presidents of IIHF.

== Later career ==
In March 2022, Fasel denied a report that he signed a contract to be an advisor to the Kontinental Hockey League (KHL). He instead stated that he has given advice to the league when he has been asked. When the IIHF suspended the Russian and Belarusian hockey federations until further notice due to the 2022 Russian invasion of Ukraine, Fasel was quoted in Russian media as saying it was a "sad moment in IIHF history", and that "Even in such a tense situation as today, sport must carry the message of peace and united people". The Associated Press reported that Fasel had been publicly friendly with Vladimir Putin, and that the Russian Hockey Federation instructed the KHL to distribute material supporting the invasion. The IIHF subsequently called for an independent ethics investigation into the actions of Fasel and the Russian Hockey Federation, and stated that former IIHF presidents were bound to a moral code of conduct.

== Personal life ==
Fasel is married and has four children. He attended the University of Fribourg and University of Bern and became a Doctor of Dental Surgery in 1977. In 1997, the IOC commissioned him to conduct a study of dental treatment of Olympic athletes. The report, "Sports Dentistry and the Olympic Games", was published in 2005. On 26 July 2012 Fasel was part of the 2012 Summer Olympics torch relay in London.

Fasel acquired Russian citizenship in 2023, and purchased a 54 per cent stake in Alma Holding, which produces apples.

Preceded by Günther Sabetzki	President of the IIHF; 1994–2021	Succeeded by Luc Tardif
