= LIHG Championships =

LIHG Championship
- Status: inactive
- Genre: sports event
- Date: early during the year
- Frequency: annual
- Inaugurated: 1912
- Most recent: 1914

The LIHG Championship was an international ice hockey tournament that existed from 1912–1914. It was organized by Ligue International de Hockey sur Glace (LIHG), the present day IIHF.

== Results ==
Year	(gold) Gold	(silver) Silver	(bronze) Bronze
1912	Germany	(Canada) Oxford Canadians	Belgium
1913	Germany	Great Britain	France
1914	Great Britain	Germany	France
