= 1912 LIHG Championship =

European ice hockey tournament in Belgium

The 1912 LIHG Championship was the first edition of the LIHG Championships. The tournament was held from March 20–24, 1912, in Brussels, Belgium. Germany won the championship, the Oxford Canadians finished second, and Belgium finished third.

== Results ==
=== Final Table ===
Pl.	Team	GP	W	T	L	Goals	Pts
1.	Germany	4	4	0	0	31:15	8
2.	(Canada) Oxford Canadians	4	2	1	1	37:18	5
3.	Belgium	4	2	1	1	20:17	5
4.	France	4	1	0	3	12:26	2
5.	Switzerland	4	0	0	4	8:32	0
