= Max Sillig =

Swiss ice hockey player and builder

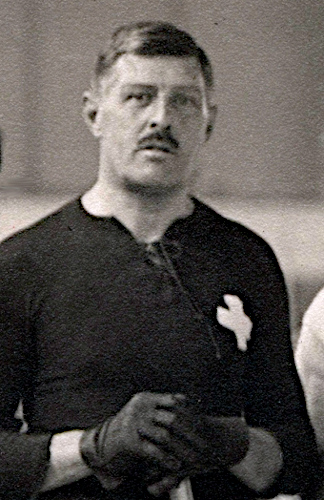
- Sillig at the 1920 Olympics.
- Born: 19 November 1873; La Tour-de-Peilz, Switzerland
- Died: 15 November 1959 (aged 85); Lausanne, Switzerland
- Position: Right wing
- National team: Switzerland
- Playing career: 1904–1924

Max Sillig (19 November 1873 – 15 November 1959) was a Swiss ice hockey player and builder.

== Career ==
Sillig was born in La Tour-de-Peilz, and played for the Switzerland men's national ice hockey team at the 1920 Summer Olympics in Antwerp. He played at RW position throughout his career. He is sometimes called as the "Father of Swiss Ice Hockey". In 1905, he founded Hockey Club, Bellerive that in 1907 and 1908 won the championship of Western Switzerland and in 1909 became the first Swiss Ice Hockey champion.

He was president of the International Ice Hockey Federation from 1920–1922. His successor was Paul Loicq. He died in Lausanne.

Preceded by Henri van den Bulcke	President of the IIHF; 1920–1922	Succeeded by Paul Loicq
