= 1914 LIHG Championship =

The 1914 LIHG Championship was the third and last edition of the LIHG Championships. It was held from January 20–22, 1914, in Chamonix, France. Great Britain won the championship, Germany finished second, and France finished third.

The tournament was also known as the 1914 Coupe de Chamonix.

== Results ==
=== Final Table ===
Pl.	Team	GP	W	T	L	Goals	Pts
1.	Great Britain	3	3	0	0	15:4	6
2.	Germany	3	1	1	1	6:5	3
3.	France	3	0	2	1	1:4	2
4.	Bohemia	3	0	1	2	5:14	1
