= Louis Magnus =

French figure skater, hockey executive (1881–1950)

Louis Magnus (25 May 1881 in Kingston, Jamaica – 1 November 1950) was a Jamaican-French competitive figure skater, representing France, and an ice hockey executive. He is considered as the builder of the International Ice Hockey Federation (IIHF), and was inducted into the IIHF Hall of Fame.

== Career ==
Born in Jamaica, Magnus moved to France in 1889.

Magnus competed as a figure skater in the disciplines of single skating and pair skating in France. He was the 1908–1911 French national champion in singles, and the 1912 national champion in pairs with partner Anita Del Monte. He worked as a figure skating judge for France at many international events.

A member of the group that founded the IIHF, he served as its inaugural president from 1908 to 1912, and again in 1914.

He wrote Les sports d'hiver with Renaud de la Fregeolière in 1911.

In 1997, he was inducted into the IIHF Hall of Fame.

The French ice hockey league, the Ligue Magnus, and its trophy, the Coupe Magnus, are named after him. The headquarters of the IIHF in Zurich are named "Villa Louis Magnus", also after him.

Preceded by Position created	President of the IIHF; 1908–1912	Succeeded by Henri Van den Bulcke
Preceded by Henri Van den Bulcke	President of the IIHF; 1914	Succeeded by Peter Patton
