= Paul Kraatz =

Finnish politician (1863–1926)

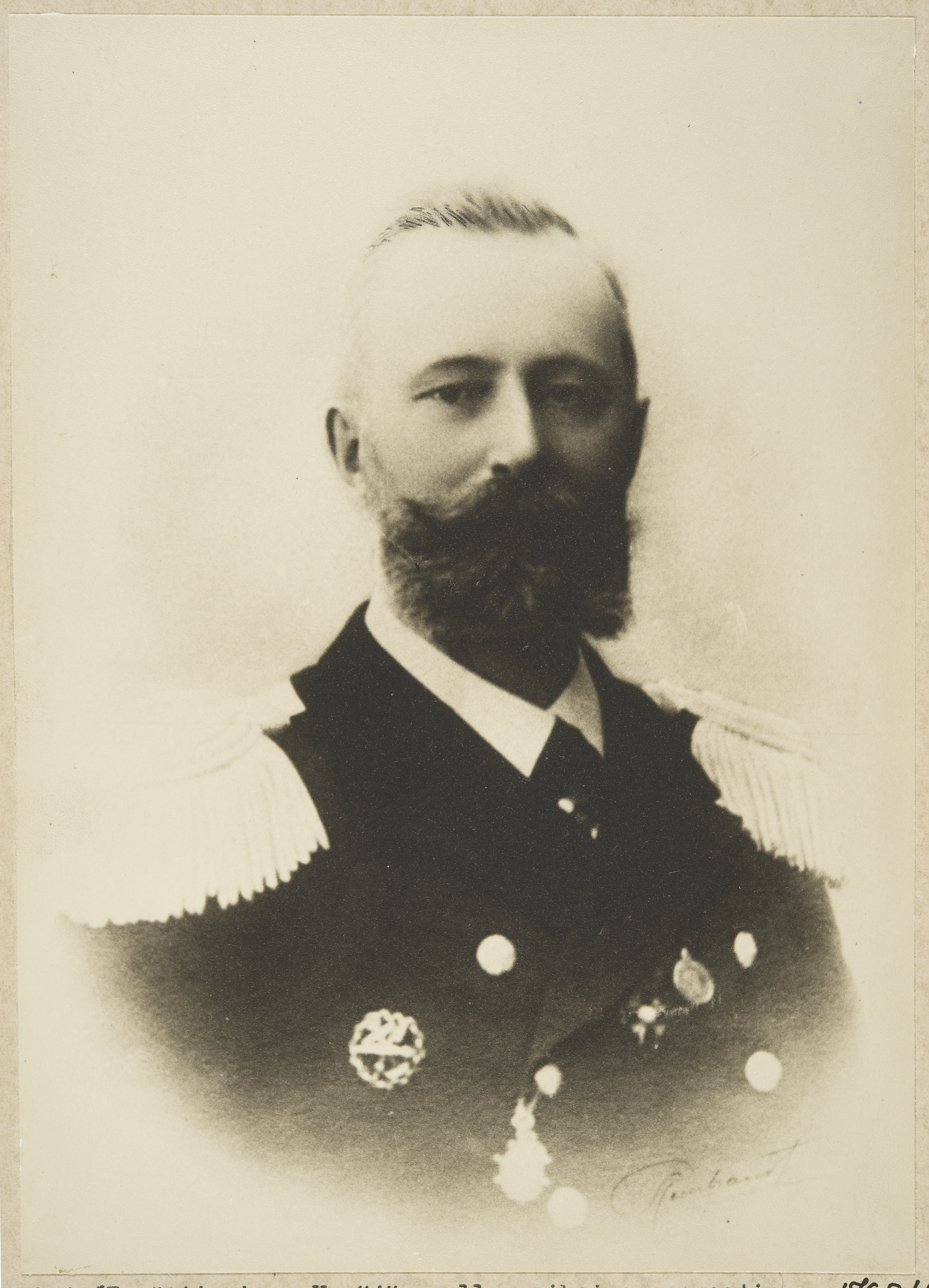
Paul Kraatz

Paul Kraatz (17 January 1863 – 30 June 1926) was a Finnish politician and general. He was a member of the Senate of Finland.

== Biography ==
Paul Kraatz's father was Heinrich Julius Kraatz, the head gardener of the Monrepos Park in Vyborg, originally a Prussian citizen. His mother was Caroline Auguste Christoffersen. Paul Kraatz studied mechanical engineering at the Polytechnic Institute in Vyborg in 1883. Kraatz made his career in the Imperial Russian Navy, entering the service as a technician in 1886. He achieved the rank of colonel in 1909 and was appointed senator to the economic department of the Finnish Senate on 12 October 1909. At first, he held the positions of head of the Chamber and Agriculture Committee in the Markov Senate, then the Committee on Church Affairs in 1911–1912, and then the Committee on Trade and Industry in the Borovitinov Senate from 1912–1917, until the dissolution of the Russified Senate on 26 March 1917. Kraatz was awarded the rank of Major General of the Engineer Corps in 1913.
