= Günther Sabetzki =

Günther Sabetzki (4 June 1915 in Düsseldorf, German Empire – 21 June 2000) was a German executive for several ice hockey leagues and organizations.

Sabetzki was one of the founding members of the German Ice Hockey Federation in 1963. He would become the organization's first co-president along with Ludwig Zametzer. In 1966 he was elected as a member of the International Ice Hockey Federation, an organization he would lead as president, from 1975 to 1994. While president of the IIHF, he was instrumental in bridging the gap between European and North American hockey powers, and helped bring Hockey Canada back into the Olympic fold in 1980. In 1982, Sabetzki formed the first German women's hockey league. It was formed in North Rhine-Westphalia. During his tenure as IIHF president, membership in the IIHF rose from 31 countries to 50. He was also responsible for overseeing the punishments following the Punch-up in Piestany.

== Awards and honors ==
Sabetzki was inducted into the Hockey Hall of Fame in 1995, and into the IIHF Hall of Fame in 1997.

Preceded by Bunny Ahearne	President of the IIHF; 1975–1994	Succeeded by René Fasel
