= 1909 Coupe de Chamonix =

The 1909 Coupe de Chamonix was the first edition of the Coupe de Chamonix, an international ice hockey tournament. It was held from January 23-25, 1909, in Chamonix, France. Princes Ice Hockey Club from Great Britain won the tournament.

== Results ==
=== Final Table ===
Pl.	Team	GP	W	T	L	Goals	Pts
1.	(United Kingdom) Princes Ice Hockey Club	4	4	0	0	20:1	8
2.	(France) Club des Patineurs de Paris	4	3	0	1	13:3	6
3.	(Switzerland) Club des Patineurs Lausanne	4	2	0	2	14:10	4
4.	(Belgium) Fédération des Patineurs de Belgique	4	1	0	3	6:12	2
5.	(Czech Republic) Students Prague	4	0	0	4	4:31	0
