= International Ice Hockey Federation =

Worldwide governing body for ice hockey

- Fédération internationale de hockey sur glace Internationale Eishockey-Föderation
- Abbreviation: IIHF
- Formation: 15 May 1908; 118 years ago
- Founded at: Paris, France
- Type: Sports federation
- Legal status: Governing body of ice hockey
- Purpose: Sport governance
- Headquarters: Zurich, Switzerland
- Region served: Worldwide
- Members: 84 members
- Official languages: English, French, German
- President: Franz Reindl
- Website: www.iihf.com

The International Ice Hockey Federation (IIHF; French: Fédération internationale de hockey sur glace; German: Internationale Eishockey-Föderation) is a worldwide governing body for ice hockey. It is based in Zurich, Switzerland, and has 84 member countries.

The IIHF maintains the IIHF World Ranking based on international ice hockey tournaments. Rules of play for IIHF events differ from hockey in North America and the rules of the National Hockey League (NHL). Decisions of the IIHF can be appealed through the Court of Arbitration for Sport in Lausanne, Switzerland. The IIHF maintains its own hall of fame for international ice hockey. The IIHF Hall of Fame was founded in 1997, and has been located within the Hockey Hall of Fame since 1998.

Previously, the IIHF also managed the development of inline hockey, but in June 2019, the IIHF announced that they would no longer govern inline hockey or organize the Inline Hockey World Championships.

== Functions ==
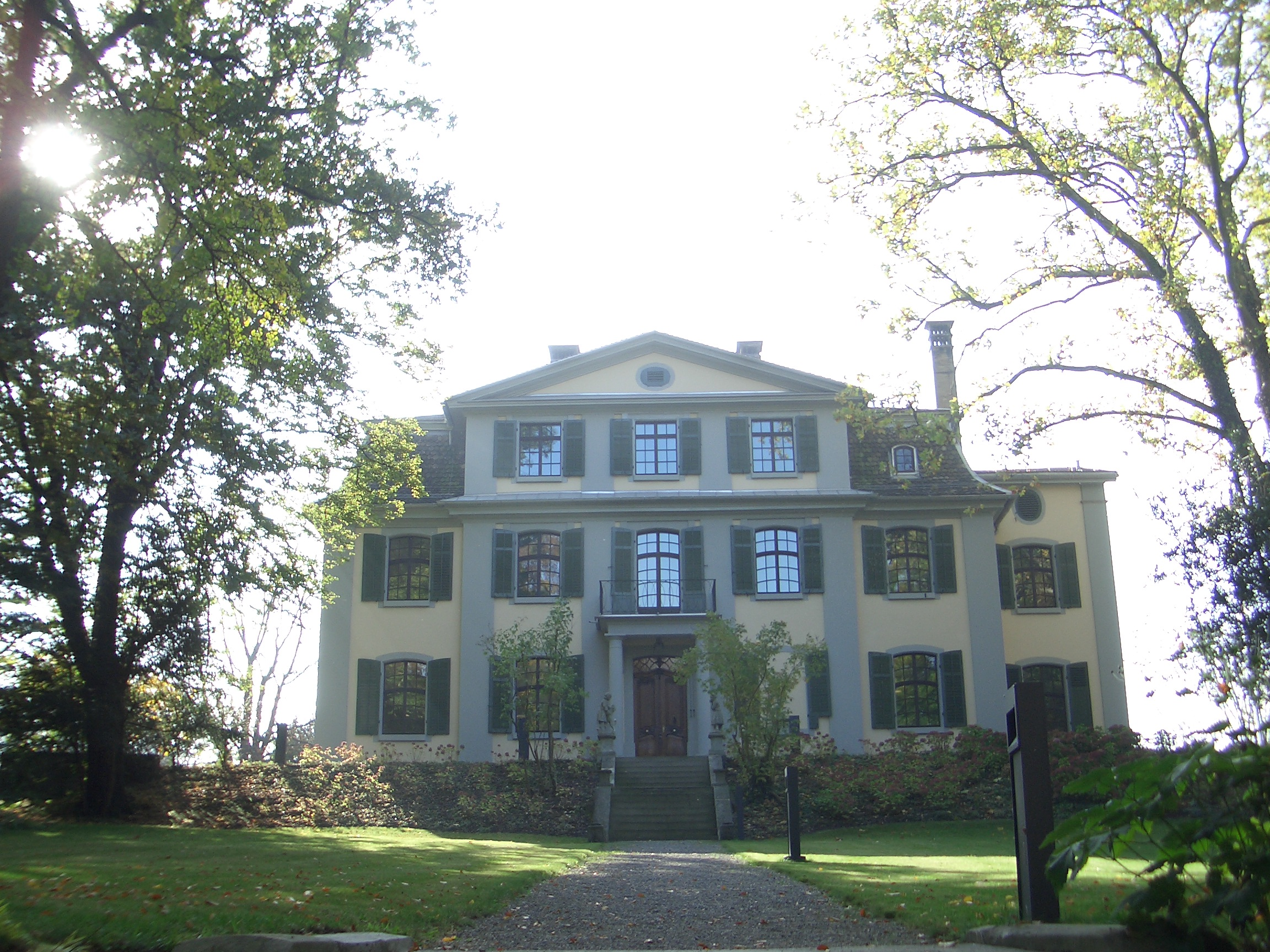
IIHF Headquarters in Zurich (Villa Freigut, Enge).

The main functions of the IIHF are to govern, develop and organize hockey throughout the world. Another duty is to promote friendly relations among the member national associations and to operate in an organized manner for the good order of the sport. The federation may take the necessary measures in order to conduct itself and its affairs in accordance with its statutes, bylaws and regulations as well as in holding a clear jurisdiction with regards to ice hockey at the international level. The IIHF is the body responsible with arranging the sponsorships, license rights, advertising and merchandising in connection with all IIHF competitions.

Another purpose of the federation is to provide aid in the young players' development and in the development of coaches and game officials. On the other hand, all the events of IIHF are organized by the federation along with establishing and maintaining contact with any other sport federations or sport groups. The IIHF is responsible for processing the international players' transfers. It is also the body that presides over ice hockey at the Olympic Games as well as over all levels of the IIHF World Championships. The federation works in collaboration with local committees when organizing its 25 World Championships, at five different categories.

The IIHF is also responsible for the organization of European club competitions such as the Champions Hockey League or the Continental Cup.

The federation is governed by the legislative body of the IIHF which is the General Congress along with the executive body, which is the council. The Congress is entitled to make decisions with regard to the game's rules, the statutes and bylaws in the name of the federation. It is also the body that elects the president and the council or otherwise known as board. The president represents the IIHF's interests in external matters and enforces the federation's statutes and regulations. The president is assisted by the general secretary, the highest-ranked IIHF employee.

== History ==
The International Ice Hockey Federation was founded on 15 May 1908 at 34 Rue de Provence in Paris, France, as Ligue Internationale de Hockey sur Glace (LIHG). The 1920 Olympics were the first to integrate hockey into their program.

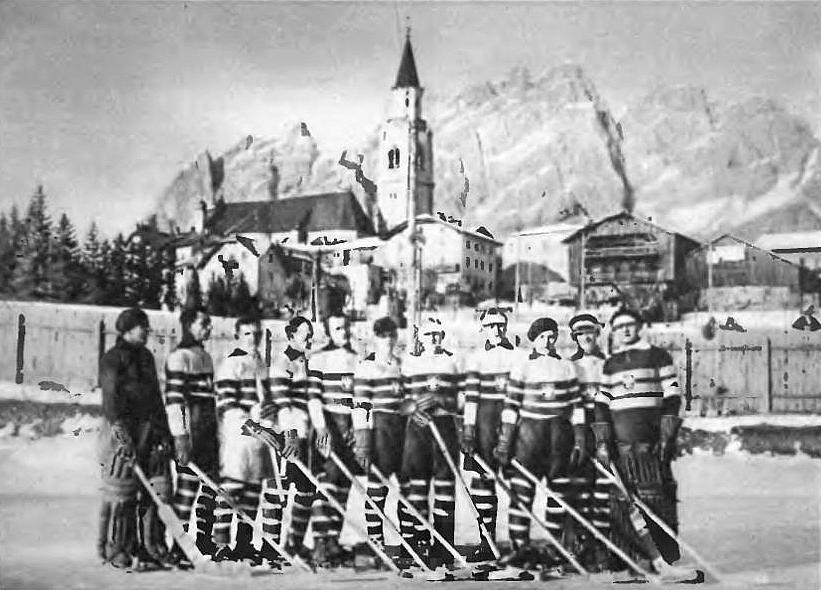
The Poland men's national ice hockey team debuted at the 1928 Winter Olympics.

The 1928 Winter Olympics, which also served as the World and European Championship for the year, saw a record 11 countries participate.

The Hungarian Revolution of 1956 which had caused Hungary to be occupied by the Soviet Army, led to a boycott of the 1957 World Championships, which were being staged in Moscow. Canada and the United States led the boycott, and were joined by Norway, West Germany, Italy, and Switzerland.

The 1962 World Championship, hosted by the American cities of Colorado Springs and Denver, was boycotted by the Soviet Union and Czechoslovakia, which led to a further boycott by the other Eastern Bloc countries. At issue was the boycott of the 1957 championships in Moscow by Canada and the United States, and the Americans refusal of East German passports in reaction to the building of the Berlin Wall by East Germany.

For the 1965–66 season, the IIHF created the European Cup, a tournament consisting of the top club teams from around Europe. The competition was originated by Günther Sabetzki, based on the Association football European Cup (now UEFA Champions League). In 1968 the IIHF organized the European U19 Championship, a junior competition for players aged 19 and under. The age limit was later reduced to 18 in 1977.

During the 1980s Canada stopped boycotting the World Championships and Olympic Games. The Canadians had boycotted these tournaments between 1970 and 1976 after the IIHF had refused to allow them to roster professional players at the World Championships from NHL teams that had not qualified for the Stanley Cup playoffs. President Sabetzki found a compromise that resulted in the return of Canada to international events beginning in 1977. The pro players whose teams had been eliminated from the playoffs were allowed to compete and in exchange, Canada agreed to participate in the World Championships. They also waived their right to host any World Championships. The creation of the Canada Cup (a competition organized by the NHL in Canada every four years) was also part of the new agreement between the IIHF and North American professional hockey.

The IIHF continued to grow in numbers during the 1980s and 1990s, both due to political events and the continued growth of hockey worldwide. The dissolution of the Soviet Union saw its membership transferred to Russia, and the addition of four ex-Soviet republics; Azerbaijan, Belarus, Kazakhstan, and Ukraine to the federation. In addition, the memberships of Estonia, Latvia, and Lithuania - all of which had initially joined the IIHF in the 1930s but were expelled following their annexation by the Soviet Union - were renewed. The breakup of Yugoslavia also resulted in an increase in membership. Croatia and Slovenia joined as new members, while the membership of the old Yugoslavia was transferred to FR Yugoslavia (which later became known as Serbia and Montenegro and still later dissolved into the independent republics of Serbia and Montenegro). When Czechoslovakia broke up, its membership rights were transferred to the Czech Republic, and Slovakia was admitted as a new member. The influx of new members resulted in the IIHF increasing the size of the Group A tournament. It expanded from 8 teams to 12 in 1992 and from 12 to 16 in 1998.

The IIHF celebrated its 100th anniversary in 2008. As part of the celebrations, the 2008 World Championship was held in Canada for the first time (the tournament was co-hosted by the cities of Halifax and Quebec City).

The number of members grew in the 21st century: Chile (2000), Bosnia and Herzegovina (2001), Liechtenstein (2001), North Macedonia (2001), the United Arab Emirates (2001), Macau (2005), Malaysia (2006), Moldova (2008; presumably expelled from IIHF membership in 2023), Georgia (2009), Kuwait (2009; had originally joined in 1985, but was expelled in 1992), Morocco (2010), Kyrgyzstan (2011), Jamaica (2012), Qatar (2012), Oman (2014), Turkmenistan (2015), Indonesia (2016), Nepal (2016), the Philippines (2016), Algeria (2019), Colombia (2019), Iran (2019), Lebanon (2019), Uzbekistan (2019), Tunisia (2021), Puerto Rico (2022), Bahrain (2024), Kenya (2024).

The IIHF received international criticism for holding the 2014 Men's Ice Hockey World Championships in Belarus, because of the poor human rights record of the country. Several human rights organisations launched the "Don't play with the dictator!" boycott campaign and there were appeals from the US Congress, the German Parliament, and the European Parliament.

The IIHF again received criticism for planning to partly hold the 2021 Men's Ice Hockey World Championships in Belarus. In January 2021, the IIHF withdrew the 2021 World Championship from Minsk due to safety and security issues during the political unrest, besides the COVID-19 pandemic and decided to solely hold the tournament in Riga, Latvia.

On 23 May 2021, civilian Ryanair Flight 4978, which was en route from Athens to Vilnius, was forced to land in Minsk and a passenger of that flight was detained. In protest, Latvian officials replaced the Belarusian state flag in Riga with the former flag associated with the Belarusian opposition groups, including at the 2021 IIHF World Championship display of flags. This was by order of Mayor of Riga Mārtiņš Staķis and Minister of Foreign Affairs of Latvia Edgars Rinkēvičs. The IIHF issued a statement protesting the replacement of the flag, and IIHF president René Fasel asked the mayor to remove the IIHF name, its flag and its symbols from such sites, or to restore the flag, insisting that the IIHF is an "apolitical sports organization". In response, Staķis said he would remove the IIHF flags.

On 28 February 2022, the IIHF suspended the memberships of the Russian and Belarusian ice hockey federations until further notice due to the countries' invasion of Ukraine.

Still, non-Russian players in Russian clubs are according to IIHF rules bound by their contracts, and cannot leave their clubs and Russia until their contracts expire or are terminated by their club. If players leave anyway they can be sued and would be blocked from playing for other clubs.

On 22 March 2023, the IIHF excluded Russian and Belarusian national and club teams from IIHF competitions during the 2023–24 season, based on safety considerations.

== Honors and awards ==
The IIHF awards ceremony is held annually on the second last day of each Ice Hockey World Championship, and its hall of fame induction ceremony on the final day of the championships. Prior to 2024, all awards were presented during one ceremony on the final day of the championships.

=== Hall of Fame ===
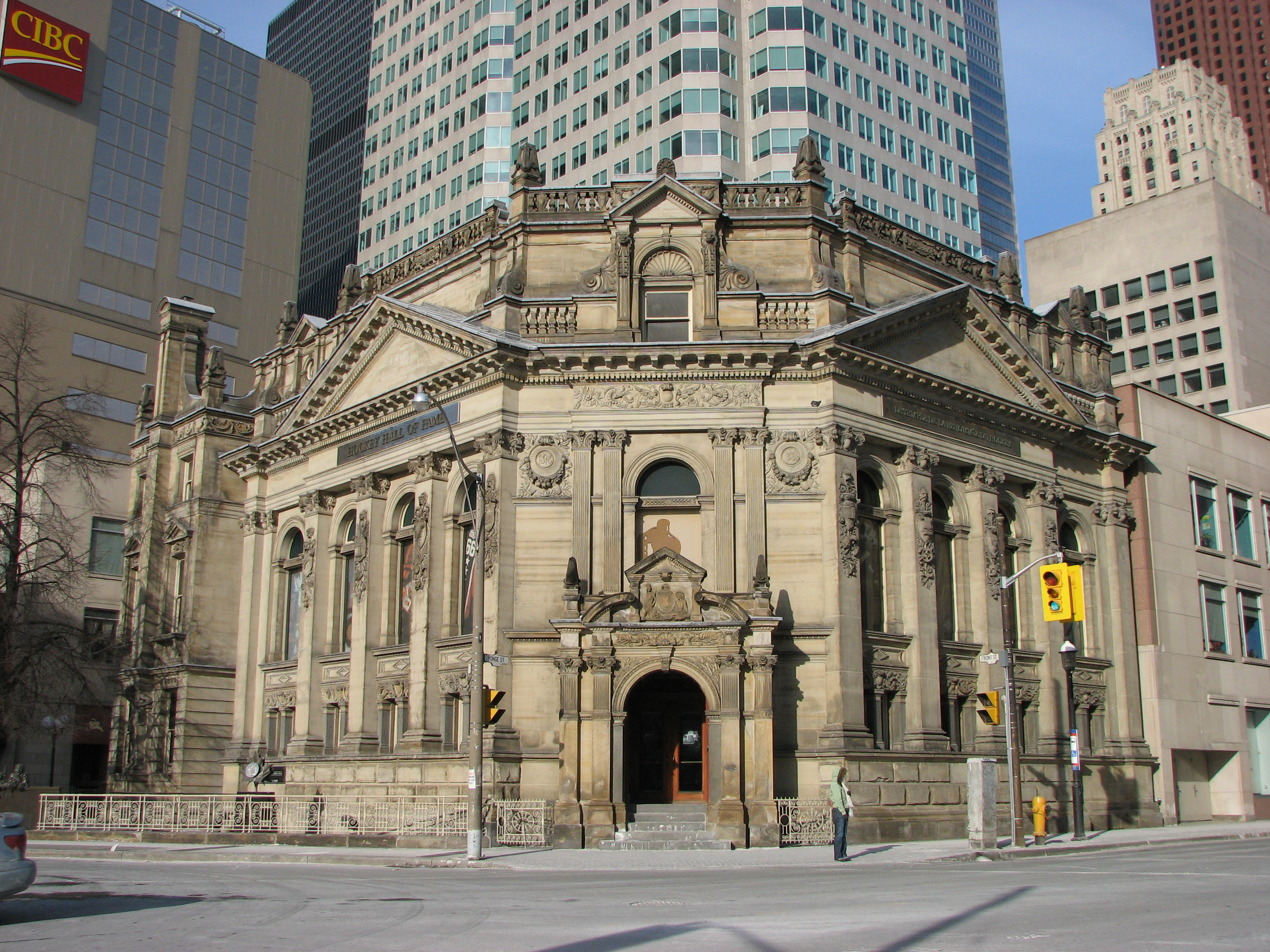
The Hockey Hall of Fame in Toronto has hosted the IIHF Hall of Fame since 1998.

Prior to the establishment of the IIHF Hall of Fame, the IIHF displayed a collection of historical artifacts from World Championships and the Olympic Games in temporary exhibits. From 1992 to 1997, the IIHF loaned its exhibits to the International Hockey Hall of Fame in Kingston, Ontario, Canada.

The first step taken by the IIHF to create its own hall of fame was a proposal made in 1996, which was later ratified at the 1997 IIHF summer congress to host the museum in Zürich. The approval came exactly 89 years from the foundation of the IIHF, with the purpose of honoring former international ice hockey players, builders (administrators) and officials. The annual induction ceremony takes place on the medal presentation day of the Ice Hockey World Championships. The IIHF agreed with the National Hockey League to transfer its exhibits to the Hockey Hall of Fame in Toronto, Canada, as of 29 July 1998.

In 2015, the IIHF created the Torriani Award for "players with an outstanding career from non-top hockey nations". The award was named for Bibi Torriani, who played internationally for the Switzerland men's national ice hockey team. The IIHF includes the recipients of the Torriani Award in the list of Hall of Fame inductees.

=== Paul Loicq Award ===
The Paul Loicq Award was established in 1998. It is presented annually to honor a person who has made "outstanding contributions to the IIHF and international ice hockey". Named after Paul Loicq, who was president of the IIHF from 1922 until 1947, it is the highest personal recognition given by the IIHF.

=== Centennial All-Star Team ===
The IIHF Centennial All-Star Team is an all-star team of hockey players from international tournaments. The team was chosen based on the players' "impact in international ice hockey over a period of at least a decade," with a requirement that they must have performed "at the highest possible level (Olympics, the IIHF World Championship or the Canada Cup/World Cup tournaments)." The selection was named in 2008. All six players were already members of the IIHF Hall of Fame.

=== Milestone Award ===
The Milestone Award was established in 2012, to be given to "the team or teams that make a significant contribution to international hockey or will have a decisive influence on the development of the game". The IIHF wanted an award to recognize great events, great teams or moments that have shaped the game, and sought suggestions from hockey fans to rename it. The award is given occasionally; it was not given between 2013 and 2024, nor in 2026.

Year	Recipient(s)	Milestone accomplishment(s)
2012	1972 Canada men's national team 1972 Soviet Union men's national team	Awarded for the 40th anniversary of the 1972 Summit Series between Canada and the Soviet Union. Reuters wrote that Canada was expected to win the series easily, but when they came from behind to win in the eighth and final game, it marked "the beginning of the modern hockey era".
2013	1954 Soviet Union men's national team	Awarded for winning the gold medal at the 1954 Ice Hockey World Championships, which was their country's first appearance at the World Championships and the beginning of a rivalry versus the Canada men's national team.
2024	1998 Czech Republic men's national team	Awarded for winning the gold medal in ice hockey at the 1998 Winter Olympics, which included victories versus Canada in the semifinal, and Russia in the finals. The 1998 Olympic hockey tournament was also the first the include National Hockey League players. The IIHF reported the gold medal to be "the most important event in the country's history after the 1968 Uprising".
2025	2002–03 Denmark men's national teams	Awarded for earning promotion to the World Championships top tier, after 53 years in lower divisions. Denmark won Division I-B at the 2002 Men's Ice Hockey World Championships to play at the 2003 IIHF World Championship, and has remained at the top level since.
2025	2006 Sweden men's national team	Awarded for becoming the first men's national team to win an Olympic gold medal and the World Championships in the same year. Sweden gold at both the 2006 Winter Olympics and the 2006 IIHF World Championship, with eight players appearing in both events.

=== All-Time Teams ===
The IIHF chose all-time teams for the 16 countries that would have participated at the 2020 IIHF World Championship, to honor the 100-year anniversary of the Ice Hockey World Championships.

=== Player of the year awards ===
The IIHF established male and female player of the year awards in 2023, to be given annually in recognition of the player who "best exemplifies exceptional skill, determination, team success, and sporting character on and off the ice during the preceding season". It is selected by a panel of media and representatives drawn from IIHF member states. To be eligible, a player must have competed in at least one of four IIHF tournaments (the Winter Olympics, IIHF World Championships, IIHF World Junior Championships, or IIHF World U18 Championships) as well as in a national domestic league "of the highest caliber for that country," with "the combined performances of which were deemed superior to all other players".

=== Johan Bollue Award ===
The Johan Bollue Award was established in 2023, and named for Johan Bollue (1964–2021) who served as the sports development director for the Royal Belgian Ice Hockey Federation, and was an organizer at Youth Olympic Games, and a mentor coach at IIHF development camps. The award is given to an individual or a group who have made significant contributions to growth and development in youth ice hockey. Recipients of the award include Markus Graf in 2024, Jim Aldred in 2025, and Aleksandrs Cicurskis in 2026.

=== Media Award ===
The IIHF Media Award was established in 2024, given to an individual who made outstanding contributions to international hockey through television, print, and radio. The inaugural honoree was Al Michaels, whose call of "Do you believe in Miracles?" described the Miracle on Ice victory by the United States men's national team in ice hockey at the 1980 Winter Olympics. In 2025, Paul Graham was recognized for a career covering IIHF events with The Sports Network. The third recipient was Czech journalist Pavel Barta, honored in 2026.

== Tournaments ==
=== Men's ===
Current top four per tournament – Current pool: 58 countries
Tournament	Year	Champions	Runners-up	Third place	Fourth place
Winter Olympics	2026	United States	Canada	Finland	Slovakia
IIHF World Championship	2026	Finland	Switzerland	Norway	Canada
U-20 IIHF World Championship	2026	Sweden	Czechia	Canada	Finland
U-18 IIHF World Championship	2026	Sweden	Slovakia	Czechia	Latvia

=== Women's ===
Current top four per tournament – Current pool: 44 countries
Tournament	Year	Champions	Runners-up	Third place	Fourth place
Winter Olympics	2026	United States	Canada	Switzerland	Sweden
IIHF Women's World Championship	2025	United States	Canada	Finland	Czechia
U-18 IIHF Women's World Championship	2026	United States	Canada	Czechia	Sweden
IIHF European Cup of Nations	2026–27				

=== Club ===
Current top four per tournament
Tournament	Year	Champions	Runners-up	Third place	Fourth place
Champions Hockey League	2025–26	Frölunda HC	Luleå HF	Brynäs IF & EV Zug	
IIHF Continental Cup	2025–26	Nottingham Panthers	Kazzinc-Torpedo	Herning Blue Fox	GKS Katowice

=== Developmental ===
Since 2017, the IIHF has sanctioned the IIHF Development Cup for developing men's and women's national teams that do not qualify to compete in the IIHF World Championships.

Tournament	Year	Gender	Champions	Runners-up	Third place
IIHF Development Cup	2025	Men	Puerto Rico	Liechtenstein	Portugal
IIHF Development Cup	2023	Women	Colombia	Argentina	Iran

== Executives and personnel ==
The IIHF employs twenty staff members at the headquarters in Zurich.

=== Presidents ===
Name	Years
(France) Louis Magnus	1908–1912
(Belgium) Henri van den Bulcke	1912–1914
(France) Louis Magnus	1914
(United Kingdom) Peter Patton	1914
(Belgium) Henri van den Bulcke	1914–1920
(Switzerland) Max Sillig	1920–1922
(Belgium) Paul Loicq	1922–1947
(Switzerland) Fritz Kraatz	1947–1948
(Canada) W. G. Hardy	1948–1951
(Switzerland) Fritz Kraatz	1951–1954
(United States) Walter A. Brown	1954–1957
(United Kingdom) Bunny Ahearne	1957–1960
(Canada) Robert Lebel	1960–1963
(United Kingdom) Bunny Ahearne	1963–1966
(United States) William Thayer Tutt	1966–1969
(United Kingdom) Bunny Ahearne	1969–1975
(Germany) Günther Sabetzki	1975–1994
(Switzerland) René Fasel	1994–2021
(France) Luc Tardif	2021–2026
(Germany) Franz Reindl	2026–present

=== Chief Medical Officers ===
- Wolf-Dieter Montag, Germany (1975 to 1998)
- Mark Aubry, Canada (1998 to present)

== Members ==
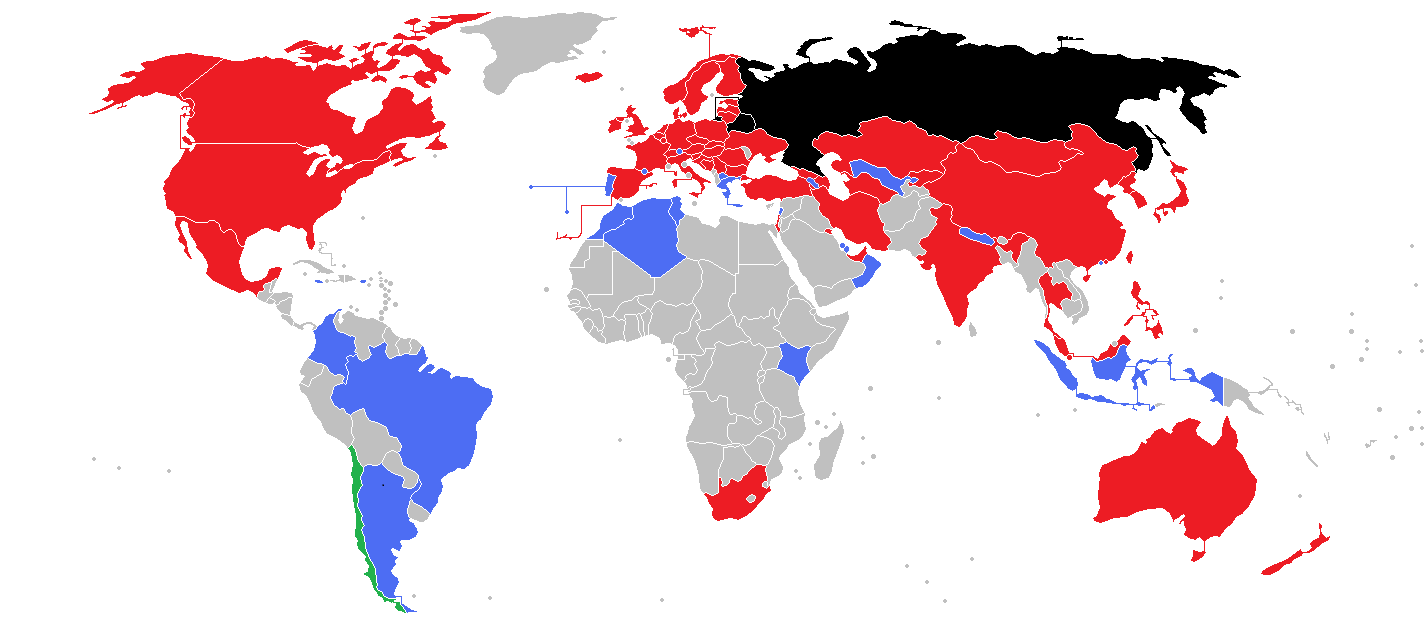
Map of the world with current members of the IIHF. (Red indicates full members, blue indicates associate members, green indicates affiliate members and black indicates suspended members.)

As of 14 July 2026, the IIHF has 84 members.

The federation has 62 full members, including two suspended members: Armenia, Australia, Austria, Azerbaijan, Belarus (suspended), Belgium, Bosnia and Herzegovina, Bulgaria, Canada, China, Croatia, Czech Republic, Denmark, Estonia, Finland, France, Georgia, Germany, Great Britain, Hong Kong, Hungary, Iceland, India, Iran, Ireland, Israel, Italy, Japan, Kazakhstan, Kuwait, Kyrgyzstan, Latvia, Lithuania, Luxembourg, Malaysia, Mexico, Mongolia, the Netherlands, New Zealand, North Korea, Norway, the Philippines, Poland, Romania, Russia (suspended), Serbia, Singapore, Slovakia, Slovenia, South Africa, South Korea, Spain, Sweden, Switzerland, Taiwan, Thailand, Turkey, Turkmenistan, Ukraine, the United Arab Emirates, the United States, and Uzbekistan. Full members have a national body dedicated to the sport, and participate annually in the international championships. Only full members have voting rights.

In addition, there are 21 associate and 1 affiliate member who either do not have a national body dedicated to the sport, or do not regularly participate in the international championships. They are Algeria, Andorra, Argentina, Bahrain, Brazil, Chile, Colombia, Greece, Indonesia, Jamaica, Kenya, Lebanon, Liechtenstein, Macau, Morocco, Nepal, North Macedonia, Oman, Portugal, Puerto Rico, Qatar, and Tunisia.

=== By division ===
==== Men ====
The following countries competed in the 2026 Men's Ice Hockey World Championships, divided by tier:

Division	IIHF members
Top	(Austria) (Canada) (Czech Republic) (Denmark) (Finland) (Germany) (United Kingdom) (Hungary) (Italy) (Latvia) (Norway) (Slovakia) (Slovenia) (Switzerland) (Sweden) (United States)
I	(China) (Estonia) (France) (Japan) (Kazakhstan) (Lithuania) (Netherlands) (Poland) (Romania) (South Korea) (Spain) (Ukraine)
II	(Australia) (Belgium) (Bulgaria) (Chinese Taipei) (Croatia) (Georgia (country)) (Iceland) (Israel) (Kyrgyzstan) (New Zealand) (Serbia) (United Arab Emirates)
III	(Bosnia and Herzegovina) (Hong Kong) (Luxembourg) (Mexico) (Mongolia) (North Korea) (Philippines) (South Africa) (Thailand) (Turkey) (Turkmenistan) (Uzbekistan)
IV	(Armenia) (Indonesia) (Iran) (Kuwait) (Malaysia) (Singapore)

==== Men U20 ====
The following countries competed in the 2026 World Junior Ice Hockey Championships, divided by tier:

Division	IIHF members
Top	Canada Czech Republic Denmark Finland Germany Latvia Slovakia Sweden Switzerland United States
I	Austria Estonia France Hungary Italy Japan Kazakhstan Lithuania Norway Poland Slovenia Ukraine
II	Australia People's Republic of China Croatia United Kingdom Iceland Israel Netherlands New Zealand Romania Serbia South Korea Spain
III	(Hong Kong) (Iran)

==== Women ====
The following countries competed in the 2026 Women's Ice Hockey World Championships, divided by tier:

Division	IIHF members
Top	(Austria) (Canada) (Czech Republic) (Denmark) (Finland) (Germany) (Japan) (Sweden) (Switzerland) (United States)
I	(China) (France) (United Kingdom) (Hungary) (Italy) (Kazakhstan) (Latvia) (Netherlands) (Norway) (Slovakia) (South Korea) (Spain)
II	(Australia) (Belgium) (Chinese Taipei) (Hong Kong) (Iceland) (Lithuania) (Mexico) (New Zealand) (Poland) (Slovenia) (Ukraine)
III	(Bosnia and Herzegovina) (Bulgaria) (Croatia) (Estonia) (Israel) (Philippines) (Romania) (Serbia) (Singapore) (South Africa) (Thailand) (Turkey)

=== Registered players ===
Based on the number of registered ice hockey players, including male, female and junior, provided by the respective countries' federations. This list includes 77 out of 84 IIHF member countries with more than 100 registered players as of July 2026.

Country	Registered players	% of registered players	% of population
United States	212,812	26.80%	0.061%
Canada	183,371	23.10%	0.453%
Russia	90,160	11.36%	0.063%
Sweden	76,841	9.68%	0.718%
Finland	33,486	4.22%	0.596%
France	23,560	2.97%	0.035%
Switzerland	18,605	2.34%	0.207%
Japan	13,842	1.74%	0.011%
Germany	10,965	1.38%	0.013%
China	10,786	1.36%	0.001%
Belarus	10,335	1.30%	0.116%
United Kingdom	9,894	1.25%	0.014%
Czechia	9,107	1.15%	0.087%
Latvia	5,586	0.70%	0.304%
Ukraine	5,341	0.67%	0.014%
Australia	5,270	0.66%	0.019%
Kazakhstan	4,931	0.62%	0.023%
Austria	4,828	0.61%	0.053%
Poland	4,003	0.50%	0.011%
Slovakia	3,699	0.47%	0.068%
Norway	3,632	0.46%	0.064%
South Korea	3,587	0.45%	0.007%
Denmark	3,503	0.44%	0.058%
Netherlands	3,088	0.39%	0.017%
Belgium	2,947	0.37%	0.025%
India	2,554	0.32%	0.000%
New Zealand	2,446	0.31%	0.046%
Hungary	2,266	0.29%	0.024%
Kyrgyzstan	2,134	0.27%	0.029%
Romania	1,719	0.22%	0.009%
Turkey	1,642	0.21%	0.002%
Italy	1,631	0.21%	0.003%
Lithuania	1,576	0.20%	0.056%
North Korea	1,510	0.19%	0.006%
Mexico	1,391	0.18%	0.001%
Argentina	1,137	0.14%	0.002%
Bulgaria	1,054	0.13%	0.016%
Estonia	1,024	0.13%	0.077%
Hong Kong	891	0.11%	0.012%
Spain	864	0.11%	0.002%
Croatia	842	0.11%	0.022%
Chinese Taipei	842	0.11%	0.004%
Serbia	829	0.10%	0.012%
Mongolia	792	0.10%	0.022%
Morocco	779	0.10%	0.002%
Iran	745	0.09%	0.001%
Thailand	732	0.09%	0.001%
Iceland	718	0.09%	0.178%
Turkmenistan	710	0.09%	0.009%
Luxembourg	676	0.09%	0.098%
United Arab Emirates	651	0.08%	0.006%
Israel	613	0.08%	0.006%
South Africa	491	0.06%	0.001%
Georgia	483	0.06%	0.013%
Slovenia	469	0.06%	0.022%
Armenia	449	0.06%	0.015%
Kuwait	437	0.06%	0.009%
Uzbekistan	411	0.05%	0.001%
Puerto Rico	406	0.05%	0.013%
Colombia	379	0.05%	0.001%
Bosnia and Herzegovina	370	0.05%	0.012%
Philippines	315	0.04%	0.000%
Chile	250	0.03%	0.001%
Ireland	225	0.03%	0.004%
Nepal	202	0.03%	0.001%
Indonesia	192	0.02%	0.000%
Greece	189	0.02%	0.002%
Qatar	181	0.02%	0.006%
Singapore	140	0.02%	0.002%
Macau	139	0.02%	0.019%
Lebanon	138	0.02%	0.002%
Brazil	136	0.02%	0.000%
Algeria	128	0.02%	0.000%
Andorra	122	0.02%	0.146%
Malaysia	121	0.02%	0.000%
Portugal	115	0.01%	0.001%
Oman	112	0.01%	0.002%

== IIHF World Ranking ==
The IIHF World Ranking is a tool to reflect the long-term quality of the countries' national team program. The IIHF World Ranking is released following each IIHF Ice Hockey World Championship and the Olympic Ice Hockey Tournament.
