= Fritz Kraatz =

Swiss ice hockey player

Olympic medal record

Men's Ice hockey
Bronze medal – third place	1928 St. Moritz	Team competition

Friedrich Hermann Heinrich "Fritz" Kraatz (4 February 1906 – 15 January 1992) was a Swiss ice hockey player who competed in the 1928 Winter Olympics.

He was a member of the Swiss ice hockey team, which won the bronze medal.

Preceded by Paul Loicq	President of the LIHG; 1947–1948	Succeeded by W. G. Hardy
Preceded by W. G. Hardy	President of the IIHF; 1951–1954	Succeeded by Walter Brown
