= Henri Van den Bulcke =

Belgian ice hockey player

Personal information
- Born: 1889
- Died: 1947 (aged 57–58)

Sport
- Sport: Ice hockey
- Position: Defenceman
Medal record
Representing Belgium
Ice Hockey European Championships
Bronze medal – third place	1911 Berlin	Team
Gold medal – first place	1913 Munich	Team

Henri Van den Bulcke (1889–1947) was a Belgian ice hockey player and administrator. He won a European title in 1913 and finished third in 1911. In 1912 he founded the Royal Belgian Ice Hockey Federation and acted as its first president until 1920. During the same period he served as president of the International Ice Hockey Federation.

Preceded by Louis Magnus	President of the IIHF; 1912–1914	Succeeded by Louis Magnus
Preceded by Peter Patton	President of the IIHF; 1914–1920	Succeeded by Max Sillig
