= 2019 Deutschland Cup =

Tournament details
- Host country: Germany
- Venue: 1 (in 1 host city)
- Dates: 7–10 November
- Teams: 4

Final positions
- Champions: Switzerland (3rd title)
- Runners-up: Germany
- Third place: Russia
- Fourth place: Slovakia

Tournament statistics
- Games played: 6
- Goals scored: 38 (6.33 per game)
- Attendance: 27,304 (4,551 per game)
- Scoring leader: (Switzerland) Pius Suter (7 points)

The 2019 Deutschland Cup was the 30th edition of the tournament, held between 7 and 10 November 2019.

== Standings ==
Pos	Team	Pld	W	OTW	OTL	L	GF	GA	GD	Pts
1	Switzerland	3	1	1	1	0	12	9	+3	6
2	Germany (H)	3	1	0	2	0	9	10	−1	5
3	Russia	3	0	2	0	1	10	9	+1	4
4	Slovakia	3	0	1	1	1	7	10	−3	3

Source: IIHF
Rules for classification: 1) points; 2) head-to-head points; 3) head-to-head goal difference; 4) head-to-head number of goals scored.
(H) Host

== Results ==
7 November 2019; 16:15	Slovakia	2–5 (0–0, 0–3, 2–2)	Switzerland	Yayla Arena, Krefeld; Attendance: 2,900

Game reference

Andrej Košarišťan
Goalies
Melvin Nyffeler
Referees:
(Germany) Lasse Kopitz
(Germany) André Schrader
Linesmen:
(Germany) Kai Jürgens
(Germany) Andreas Kowert

	0–1	30:38 – Fuchs (Suter, Heldner)
	0–2	35:53 – Bertaggia (Hischier, Glauser)
	0–3	37:19 – Moy (Glauser, Kreis)
Krivošík (Šišovský, Rosandić) – 55:56	1–3
Kudrna (Hrivík, Buček) – 56:24	2–3
	2–4	56:58 – Prassl (Moy, Rod)
	2–5	59:00 – Suter (EN)

8 min
Penalties
8 min
32
Shots
28

7 November 2019; 19:45	Germany	4–3 (1–2, 2–1, 1–0)	Russia	Yayla Arena, Krefeld; Attendance: 3,025

Game reference

Mathias Niederberger
Goalies
Ilya Konovalov
Referees:
(Germany) Benjamin Hoppe
(Germany) Daniel Piechaczek
Linesmen:
(Germany) Christoffer Hurtik
(Germany) Patrick Laguzov

	0–1	04:21 – Poryadin (Ivanov, Grebenshikov)
Pietta (Fischbuch, Noebels) – 12:50	1–1
	1–2	16:15 – Yermakov (Vovchenko, Kodola)
Sezemsky (Pietta, Fischbuch) (PP) – 22:58	2–2
Kammerer (Kastner, Tiffels) – 34:25	3–2
	3–3	37:49 – Volkov (Grebenshikov, Igumnov)
Schütz (Bittner, Brandt) – 53:02	4–3

4 min
Penalties
6 min
33
Shots
32

9 November 2019; 13:00	Germany	3–4 OT (1–0, 0–1, 2–2) (OT: 0–1)	Switzerland	Yayla Arena, Krefeld; Attendance: 6,217

Game reference

Niklas Treutle
Goalies
Joren van Pottelberghe
Referees:
(Germany) Lukas Kohlmüller
(Germany) Volker Westhaus
Linesmen:
(Germany) Kai Jürgens
(Germany) Nicolaj Ponomarjow

Tiffels (Kastner, Kammerer) (PP) – 03:51	1–0
	1–1	32:09 – Rod (Fazzini, Suter) (PP)
	1–2	41:15 – Suter (Egli, Paschoud)
Pietta (Fischbuch, Noebels) – 47:22	2–2
Fischbuch (Pietta, Nowak) – 50:13	3–2
	3–3	52:09 – Fazzini (Fuchs, Suter)
	3–4	64:59 – Suter (Rod, Egli)

33 min
Penalties
33 min
6
Shots
10

9 November 2019; 16:30	Russia	3–2 OT (1–0, 0–1, 1–1) (OT: 1–0)	Slovakia	Yayla Arena, Krefeld; Attendance: 6,217

Game reference

Daniil Tarasov
Goalies
Denis Godla
Referees:
(Germany) Daniel Piechaczek
(Germany) Markus Schütz
Linesmen:
(Germany) Wayne Gerth
(Germany) Jonas Merten

Tolchinsky (Kudako, Vovchenko) – 19:11	1–0
	1–1	27:01 – Liška (Sukeľ, Kollár)
Kodola (Voronin, Yermakov) – 41:24	2–1
	2–2	55:39 – Krivošík (Kollár, Čerešňák) (EA)
Tolchinsky (Kodola, Tikhomirov) – 60:44	3–2

22 min
Penalties
34 min
8
Shots
8

10 November 2019; 11:00	Switzerland	3–4 GWS (0–1, 1–1, 2–1) (OT: 0–0) (SO: 0–1)	Russia	Yayla Arena, Krefeld; Attendance: 4,312

Game reference

Melvin Nyffeler
Goalies
Daniil Tarasov
Referees:
(Germany) Lukas Kohlmüller
(Germany) Markus Schütz
Linesmen:
(Germany) Wayne Gerth
(Germany) Kai Jürgens

	0–1	18:13 – Bryukvin (Tolchinsky, Zaitsev) (PP)
Lecoultre (Suter, Fuchs) – 21:36	1–1
	1–2	28:11 – Ilyin (Tsyplakov, Veryayev)
Moy – 41:25	2–2
Bertaggia (Moy, Egli) (PP) – 46:22	3–2
	3–3	57:01 – Igumnov (Voronkov, Tolchinsky)

Moy (miss)
Suter
Egli (miss)
Simion (miss)
Shootout
(miss) Tolchinsky
(miss) Bryukvin
Igumnov
Galimov
Kodola
39 min
Penalties
38 min
16
Shots
22

10 November 2019; 14:30	Germany	2–3 OT (1–0, 1–1, 0–1) (OT: 0–1)	Slovakia	Yayla Arena, Krefeld; Attendance: 4,633

Game reference

Mathias Niederberger
Goalies
Denis Godla
Referees:
(Germany) Daniel Piechaczek
(Germany) Volker Westhaus
Linesmen:
(Germany) Jonas Merten
(Germany) Nicolaj Ponomarjow

Eder (Müller) – 06:25	1–0
Eder (Nowak, Ugbekile) – 28:35	2–0
	2–1	31:57 – M. Sukeľ (J. Sukeľ)
	2–2	55:52 – Krivošík (Rosandić, M. Sukeľ)
	2–3	62:08 – Zuzin (Kollár, Koch)

21 min
Penalties
26 min
0
Shots
8
