= Cancer Prevention Foundation =

Russian non-profit organization

- Founded: 2010; 16 years ago
- Founder: Ilya Fomintsev
- Type: Non-governmental organization
- Location: St. Petersburg, Russia
- Region served: Russia
- Website: nenaprasno.ru

The Cancer Prevention Foundation (Russian: Фонд профилактики рака) is a Russian non-profit organization engaged in the popularization of primary prevention of malignant tumors and the introduction of a population screening system, new methods for diagnosing cancer, medical education and awareness raising programs.

== History ==
The Cancer Prevention Foundation was established in 2010. Ilya Fomintsev, an oncology surgeon, graduate of the medical faculty of Mordovian State University (2002) and the Department of Oncology of the St. Petersburg Medical Academy of Postgraduate Education (2004), became the co-founder and executive director of the fund. During his years at the Leningrad Regional Oncology Dispensary (2004-2007), his mother was diagnosed with breast cancer, and Fomintsev was directly involved in her treatment. After her death, Fomintsev resigned from the dispensary and focused on popularizing mass cancer prevention and early diagnostic methods. In 2008, together with a group of like-minded people, Fomintsev organized free preventive examinations of mammologists on the basis of the clinic where he worked, attracted sponsors to pay for the work of specialists and placed advertisements in newspapers. Later, the club 'I live not in vain' and the CPF itself were established.

== Projects ==
=== Centers for early detection of breast cancer ===
The first projects of the CPF were the Centers for the Early Detection of Breast Cancer, the first of which was opened in autumn of 2011 on the basis of the city polyclinic No. 31 in St. Petersburg at the First St. Petersburg State Medical University, and the second one - a year later on the basis of the Oncological dispensary of the Moscow district on Novoizmaylovsky prospect. Endoscopy rooms were organized there, and free consultations and research were conducted. Over the course of its work, the Centers for the Early Detection of Breast Cancer saw more than 50,000 people and identified more than 422 suspicions of breast cancer, but in 2016, due to lack of ongoing funding, the CPF decided to close them and focus on a program for assessing individual cancer risks.

=== Pink ribbon in your city ===
Since 2013, the CPF together with Avon company with the support of the Scientific Research Institute of Oncology named after N.N. Petrov, every year have been carrying out an action for the early detection of breast cancer — 'Pink ribbon in your city'. Free check-up sites open for a few days in the regional centers within the framework of the action. Also there are round tables and master classes for doctors, lectures for medical students and additional patient counseling. In 2013, the action was held in Arkhangelsk, Voronezh, Krasnoyarsk and Yekaterinburg, about 6,000 women were examined, 90 were sent for follow-up and treatment with suspicion of the presence of malignant tumors. In 2014, Tver and Surgut took part in the action. In 2015, the shares were held in Syktyvkar, Arkhangelsk, Kaliningrad, Irkutsk and Vladivostok, nearly 10,000 women were examined, more than 200 received referrals for an additional examination. In 2016, the action was held in Stavropol, Volgograd, Ufa, Yuzhno-Sakhalinsk, Novosibirsk, Tambov and Yaroslavl; it was planned to examine about 14 thousand people. During the surveys and consultations, the CPF found that the majority of women in the regions of Russia know about the need for preventive examinations, but more than half of Russians have never undergone preventive examinations and consulted mammologists only after having the symptoms.

=== Know in Order to Live ===
In May–June 2014, the CPF together with the Research Institute of Oncology named after N.N.Petrov and the Association of Oncologists of the North-West Federal District, launched a joint project 'Know in Order to Live'. Within the framework of the project the offices early detection of cancer were organized in the Institute of Oncology, they worked in an extended format. The specialists attended the II Baltic International Oncology Forum 'Prevention and cancer screening', seminars and master classes for primary care physicians, an international congress of oncomammologists 'White Nights', an international forum 'Innovations in oncogynecology' and a round table, prepared jointly with the St. Petersburg Health Committee.

=== High School of Oncology ===
In 2015, the CPF launched a grant program to fund additional training for oncologists, which got the name the High School of Oncology. In an interview Fomintsev said that he came to the idea of grants for training when one of the potential corporate sponsors set out a condition - to send a donation of 200 thousand rubles for something 'big', preferably in the field of mammology. Since the amount was insufficient for a large project, it was decided to organize a competition among graduates of medical schools, offering the winner the residency training at the Research Institute of Oncology named after N.N. Petrov. The CPF did not plan a long-term project, but the initiative received broad support among specialists who volunteered to co-finance the program or to participate in the educational process. In March 2018, the High School of Oncology held the 4th competition for 10 grants, the list of partners by that time expanded to several medical schools, and Biocad company was among the sponsors of the program. Selection in the program is carried out in 3 stages: at first, potential participants are assessed according to the level of general medical training, foreign language proficiency and motivation, at the second stage - they solve general medicine problems and write essays, and in the third stage the best applicants take part in the onsite round in Saint Petersburg. There were 38 applications for one place at the competition at the High School of Oncology in 2017. In addition to the grant for the residency training the HSO organizes a special program of additional classes which include courses in clinical decision making, analysis of scientific literature, basic research in oncology, communication with patients, medical statistics, academic writing and the English language. The classes are conducted by Russian and foreign oncologists, epidemiologists, scientists and managers from the medical field. In March 2018, the CPF opened its own lecture hall on the 2nd line of the Vasilievsky Island, where it plans to conduct seminars of the HSO and other educational meetings.

=== SCREEN ===
In April 2016 the CPF and the Institute of Oncology named after N.N. Petrov announced the 'Year of cancer prevention'. Together they introduced an automated system for assessing the risk of cancer and diagnosis of cancer SCREEN (abbr. of Scientifically-based Cancer Risk Evaluation Engine). Based on a series of questions of a short online questionnaire, the SCREEN specifies the risk of the most common types of cancer: cervical cancer, colon cancer and rectal cancer, gastric cancer, breast cancer, lung cancer, melanoma, and prostate cancer. The SCREEN algorithms, which determine the risk of cancer, were based on the results of research and practical guidelines developed by the International Agency for Research on Cancer, the American Chemical Society, the Centers for Disease Control and Prevention, Cancer Research UK, University of Texas MD Anderson Cancer Center and other organizations adapted to the Russian practice by specialists of the Oncology Research Institute. After processing the responses, the system provides the user with valid recommendations for examination and prevention and makes it possible to make an appointment for examination. According to the initial plan, in 2016-2018 SCREEN planned to test about 30 million people, which would also provide the data needed to create a model of population screening. Two years after the launch, the SCREEN system was upgraded to version 2.0. It included a personal cabinet with the results of the latest testing and recommendations for examinations, a calendar of visits to doctors and a bot for the Telegram messenger. Developers also opened API for integration into medical information systems, which allowed to expand work with partner clinics.

=== Profilaktika.Media ===
In November 2017, the CPF received a grant from the President of Russia worth 1.2 million rubles (~$20.300) to launch an awareness raising project in the field of evidence-based medicine and oncology. In March 2018, the Profilaktika.Media site was launched in cooperation with the students of the Master's program of scientific communication of the ITMO University. Initially, it included publications on chemotherapy, tumor markers, evidence-based medicine and medical education.

== Charity events ==
Fomintsev held his first charity events in his own flat, inviting the leading singers of the Mikhailovsky and Mariinsky theaters and the Saint Petersburg Philharmonia to take part in chamber concerts. During the meetings Fomintsev talked about the problems of cancer prevention, and guests could leave donations to the charity fund. In July 2012, the CPF together with the Soloists Orchestra Singolo Orchestra organized a charity concert on the roof of the Azimut Hotel on Lermontovsky Avenue. As noted by Fomintsev, it was the first mass contact of the fund with well-known bloggers, media and potential major sponsors. In June 2016, the charity concert of the CPF took place as part of the 'Year of Cancer Prevention' in the White Hall of the Lendok film studio. In 2017, the fund participated in charity events held in the course of the St. Petersburg International Economic Forum. On May 31, the Mikhailovsky Theater hosted 600 guests of the classical ballet in the framework of the 'Year of Fight Against Melanoma', supported by Biocad, at which Nikolay Tsiskaridze, Ekaterina Kondaurova, Denis Matvienko and others performed.

Russian athletes were repeatedly involved in the charity actions in support of the CPF. In October 2015, in the Lada Arena ice palace, the Lada hockey team from Tolyatti came out against the Bratislava Slovan in the gear of bright pink color, the official color of actions to fight breast cancer. Funds from ticket sales and those involved in the course of the event were sent to the CPF. Next November the hockey players Atte Engren, Andrei Yermakov, Viktor Baldaev, Dmitry Korobov, Artem Voronin and Alexander Vasilyev from the hockey club 'Spartak' took part in 'Movember' and organized a charity paid vote for best mustache. The collected funds were sent to the CPF. In April 2017, players and coaches of Moscow football clubs Spartak and CSKA published a video message 'We Play Till the Victory over Cancer', the purpose of which was to raise funds for the High School of Oncology.

== Board of Supervisors ==
The Board of Trustees of the Foundation includes nine people:

- prima ballerina of the Mariinsky Theater Ulyana Lopatkina
- football player Sergei Semak,
- actor Yevgeny Mironov,
- former vice-governor of St. Petersburg on social issues Olga Kazanskaya,
- director of the Research Institute of Oncology Alexei Belyaev,
- chief oncologist of the Leningrad region Laszlo Roman,
- director of the Saint-Petersburg Federal Compulsory Medical Insurance Fund Alexander Kuzhel,
- the chief doctor of 'PET-Technology-Podolsk' Alexander Filimonov,
- oncologist of the Krasnogvardeisky district of St. Petersburg Surkhay Ibragimov.

== Awards ==
In April 2017, Ilya Fomintsev, the executive director of the CPF, received the Expert of the Year award from the Expert Northwest Magazine in the nomination 'Expert in Health Technology' for the pilot project on controlled population screening for colorectal cancer introduced in 2016.

== Links ==
- nenaprasno.ru (in Russian)
- media.nenaprasno.ru — Profilaktika.Media (in Russian)
