= Daniil Tarasov (ice hockey, born 1999) =

Russian ice hockey player (born 1999)

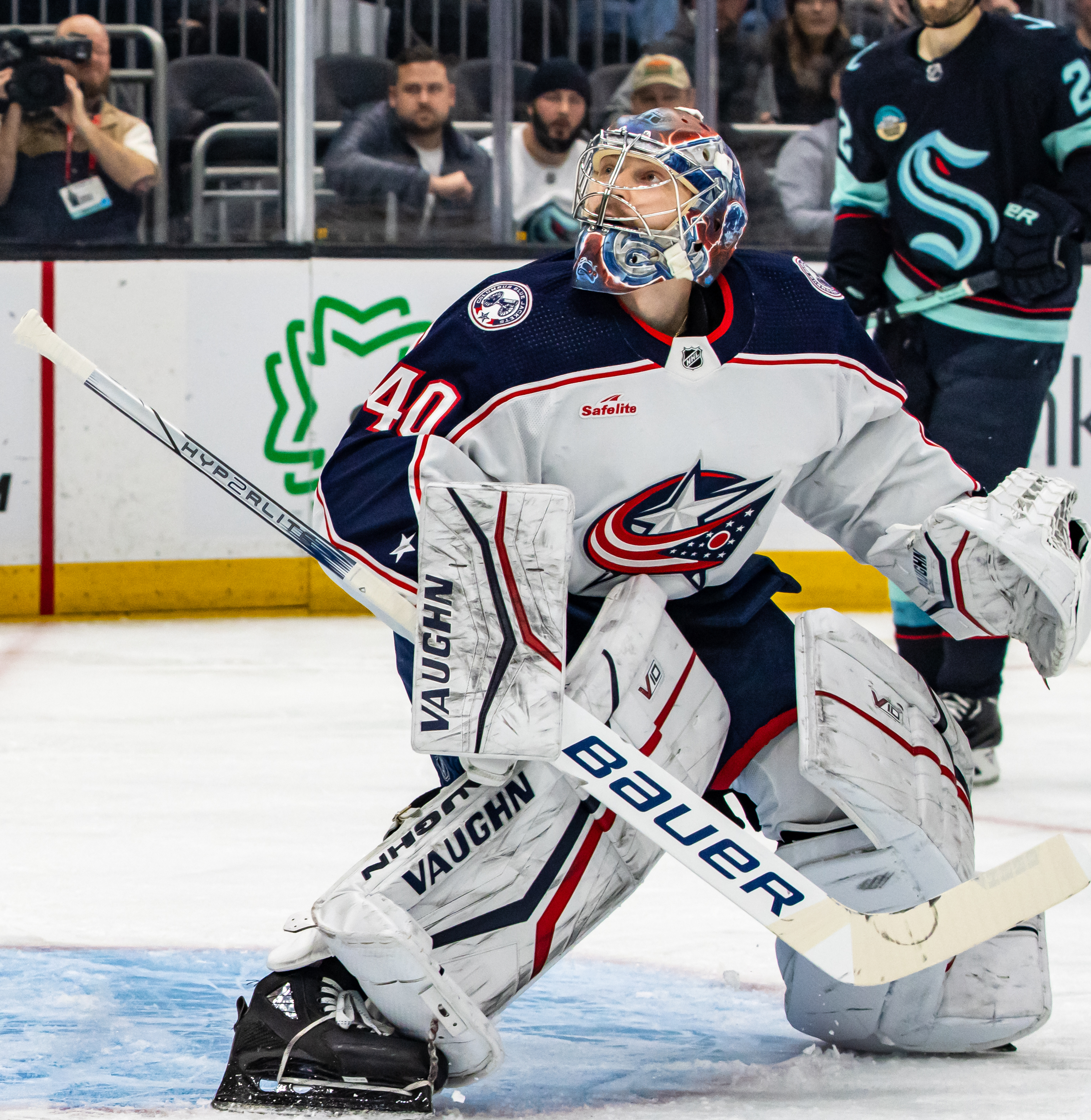
- Tarasov with the Columbus Blue Jackets in 2024
- Born: 27 March 1999 (age 27) Novokuznetsk, Russia
- Height: 6 ft 5 in (196 cm)
- Weight: 185 lb (84 kg; 13 st 3 lb)
- Position: Goaltender
- Catches: Left
- NHL team Former teams: Detroit Red Wings; Salavat Yulaev Ufa; Ässät; Columbus Blue Jackets; Florida Panthers
- NHL draft: 86th overall, 2017; Columbus Blue Jackets
- Playing career: 2018–present

Daniil Vadimovich Tarasov (Russian: Даниил Вадимович Тарасов; born 27 March 1999) is a Russian professional ice hockey player who is a goaltender for the Detroit Red Wings of the National Hockey League (NHL). He was selected in the third round, 86th overall, by the Columbus Blue Jackets in the 2017 NHL entry draft.

== Early life ==
Tarasov was born in Novokuznetsk, Kemerovo Oblast; his father, Vadim, was a goaltender for Metallurg Novokuznetsk in the Russian Superleague (RSL) when Daniil was born. Tarasov started skating when he was three years old. When he was seven years old, his family moved to Ufa after Tarasov's father signed with the Salavat Yulaev Ufa in 2006. Daniil joined the Salavat Yulaev's sports school, starting as a defenceman before making the change to goaltender at the age of eight.

== Playing career ==
=== Junior ===
On 16 November 2015, Tarasov made his Junior Hockey League (MHL) debut with Tolpar Ufa in a 6–4 win against the Chaika Nizhny Novgorod. He missed the following MHL season after he received surgery on his tibia for a tumor. He returned for the next season for Tolpar Ufa, earning the starting goaltending position with 40 games played and a 1.85 GAA and .928 SV%.

=== Professional ===
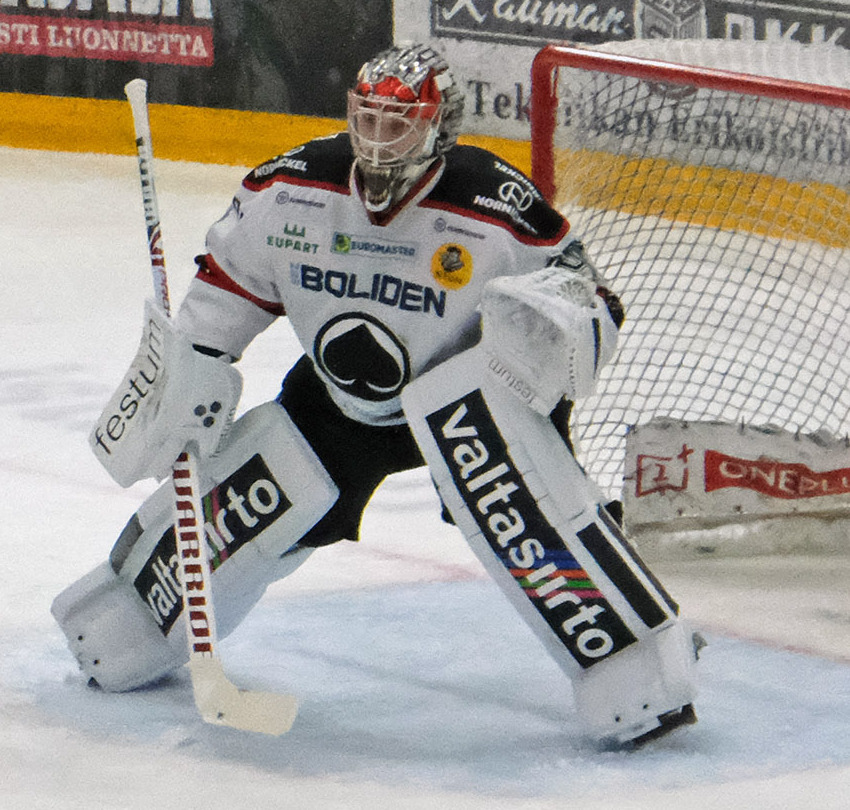
Daniil Tarasov with Porin Ässät in 2019.

Tarasov was selected 86th overall in the third round of the 2017 NHL entry draft by the Columbus Blue Jackets. On 10 September 2018, Tarasov made his professional debut for the Toros Neftekamsk of the Supreme Hockey League (VHL) in a 6–1 win against the KRS-BSU. On 9 January 2019, he recorded his first professional shutout in a 2–0 win against the Bars Kazan. In his Kontinental Hockey League (KHL) debut for the Salavat Yulaev, he recorded his first KHL shutout in a 3–0 win against the Admiral Vladivostok on 14 February 2019. He played 25 games with a 1.71 GAA and .928 SV% in his rookie professional season for the Toros, en route to winning Best Rookie in the VHL and a semi-final appearance in the 2019 Petrov Cup playoffs. After the 2018–19 season, the Salavat Yulaev offered him a contract in the KHL, however, Tarasov refused their offer.

On 4 May 2019, the Columbus Blue Jackets signed Tarasov to a three-year entry-level contract. He was loaned to Ässät in Liiga for the 2019–20 season, playing 41 games with 2.72 GAA and a .899 SV%. Because of the COVID-19 pandemic, he split his time between Salavat Yulaev in the KHL and the Blue Jackets' AHL affiliate, the Cleveland Monsters. On 3 April 2021, he made his North American professional debut for the Monsters in a 4–2 win against the Grand Rapids Griffins. He missed time in the 2021–22 season after testing positive for COVID-19.

Tarasov entered the 2021–22 season as the Monsters' starting goaltender. After both Blue Jackets goaltenders were out with an illness, on 2 December 2021, Tarasov made his NHL debut on an emergency call-up with 34 saves in a 3–2 loss against the Dallas Stars.

Tarasov earned his first-career NHL win on 23 October 2022, in Madison Square Garden when the Blue Jackets defeated the New York Rangers 5–1. He made 30 saves in the win. Tarasov is not the first Blue Jackets goalie to earn his first NHL win in MSG; his comes just under two years after Matīss Kivlenieks recorded his first NHL win in the same arena. Throughout the 2022–23 season, Tarasov has been splitting time between the Cleveland Monsters and Columbus Blue Jackets, backing up goalies Elvis Merzļikins and Joonas Korpisalo while they dealt with injury. On 20 November 2022, Tarasov made 47 saves in a 5–3 win against the Florida Panthers. This is tied for second most by a Blue Jackets rookie goalie in a single game and most saves in a game by a rookie NHL goaltender this season.

On 26 June 2025, Tarasov was traded to the Florida Panthers, in exchange for a fifth-round pick in the 2025 NHL draft; he later signed a one-year contract with the Panthers on 1 July. In the 2025–26 season, Tarasov assumed the backup goaltending duties for the Panthers behind Sergei Bobrovsky. He appeared in a career best 33 games and posted a 13-15-3 record with a 3.05 goals-against average.

As a free agent from the Panthers, Tarasov was signed to a one-year, $2 million contract with the Detroit Red Wings on 1 July 2026.

== International play ==
One week prior to the 2016 IIHF World U18 Championships, a large portion of Russia men's national under-18 ice hockey team tested positive for meldonium, which is considered a banned substance by the World Anti-Doping Agency (WADA); therefore, the entire under-18 team was replaced by the under-17 team, which included Tarasov, for the U18 World Championships. He was Russia's starting goaltender and was selected as one of the top three players on his team in the tournament. He also played for Russia men's national junior ice hockey team at the 2019 World Junior Ice Hockey Championships, winning a bronze medal, and Russia men's national ice hockey team at the 2019 Deutschland Cup.

== Personal life ==
Tarasov's father, Vadim, is a former professional goaltender who was drafted 196th overall by the Montreal Canadiens in the 1999 NHL entry draft and played 17 seasons in the RSL and KHL. He is the current goaltending coach for the Sibir Novosibirsk.

Tarasov's favourite goaltenders include Andrei Vasilevskiy, Sergei Bobrovsky, and Carey Price. After he was drafted by the Blue Jackets, he started learning English. He is married.

== Career statistics ==
=== Regular season and playoffs ===
			Regular season									Playoffs
Season	Team	League	GP	W	L	T/OT	MIN	GA	SO	GAA	SV%	GP	W	L	MIN	GA	SO	GAA	SV%
2015–16	Tolpar Ufa	MHL	9	3	0	0	282	12	0	2.55	.918	2	0	2	79	12	0	1.52	.933
2016–17	Tolpar Ufa	MHL	—	—	—	—	—	—	—	—	—	—	—	—	—	—	—	—	—
2017–18	Tolpar Ufa	MHL	40	24	10	5	2171	67	6	1.85	.928	3	0	3	178	7	0	2.36	.901
2018–19	Salavat Yulaev Ufa	KHL	2	0	1	1	84	4	0	2.86	.905	—	—	—	—	—	—	—	—
2018–19	Toros Neftekamsk	VHL	25	17	6	2	1404	40	2	1.71	.928	17	9	8	1089	34	1	1.87	.930
2019–20	Ässät	Liiga	41	11	17	9	2251	102	1	2.72	.899	—	—	—	—	—	—	—	—
2020–21	Salavat Yulaev Ufa	KHL	16	11	3	2	900	31	2	2.07	.925	2	0	0	44	0	0	0.00	1.000
2020–21	Toros Neftekamsk	VHL	5	3	1	1	305	11	0	2.16	.909	—	—	—	—	—	—	—	—
2020–21	Cleveland Monsters	AHL	6	4	2	0	361	19	0	3.16	.896	—	—	—	—	—	—	—	—
2021–22	Cleveland Monsters	AHL	11	5	3	3	668	34	0	3.06	.893	—	—	—	—	—	—	—	—
2021–22	Columbus Blue Jackets	NHL	4	0	2	0	175	7	0	2.40	.937	—	—	—	—	—	—	—	—
2022–23	Columbus Blue Jackets	NHL	17	4	11	1	875	57	0	3.91	.892	—	—	—	—	—	—	—	—
2022–23	Cleveland Monsters	AHL	11	5	5	0	561	36	0	3.85	.882	—	—	—	—	—	—	—	—
2023–24	Cleveland Monsters	AHL	4	2	1	0	210	9	0	2.57	.915	—	—	—	—	—	—	—	—
2023–24	Columbus Blue Jackets	NHL	24	8	11	3	1376	73	0	3.18	.908	—	—	—	—	—	—	—	—
2024–25	Columbus Blue Jackets	NHL	20	7	10	2	1100	65	1	3.54	.881	—	—	—	—	—	—	—	—
2024–25	Cleveland Monsters	AHL	2	1	1	0	122	6	0	2.96	.908	—	—	—	—	—	—	—	—
2025–26	Florida Panthers	NHL	33	13	15	3	1906	97	0	3.05	.895	—	—	—	—	—	—	—	—
KHL totals			18	11	4	3	984	35	2	2.13	.924	2	0	0	44	0	0	0.00	1.000
NHL totals			98	32	49	9	5,432	299	1	3.30	.897	—	—	—	—	—	—	—	—

=== International ===
Year	Team	Event	Result	GP	W	L	OT	MIN	GA	SO	GAA	SV%
2016	Russia	U18	6th	5	2	1	1	228	8	1	2.11	.921
2019	Russia	WJC	3rd place, bronze medalist(s)	3	2	1	1	129	6	1	2.80	.893
Junior totals				8	4	2	2	357	14	2	2.37	.911

== Awards and honors ==
Award	Year
VHL
Best Rookie	2019
International
U18 Top 3 player on Team	2016
