= Ansel Galimov =

Russian ice hockey player (born 1991)

- Born: April 15, 1991 (age 35) Nizhnekamsk, Russian SFSR, Soviet Union
- Height: 6 ft 2 in (188 cm)
- Weight: 170 lb (77 kg; 12 st 2 lb)
- Position: Forward
- Shoots: Left
- KHL team Former teams: Free agent Neftekhimik Nizhnekamsk; Metallurg Novokuznetsk; Dynamo Moscow; Avangard Omsk; Severstal Cherepovets; Spartak Moscow; HC Sochi
- Playing career: 2012–present

Ansel Galimov (born April 15, 1991) is a Russian professional ice hockey player. He is currently an unrestricted free agent. He most recently played with HC Dynamo Moscow in the Kontinental Hockey League (KHL).

== Playing career ==
Galimov made his KHL debut playing with HC Neftekhimik Nizhnekamsk during the 2012–13 KHL season before playing with Metallurg Novokuznetsk in the KHL from September 2013 until April 2015.

After two seasons with Dynamo, Galimov, while still contracted, was granted free agent status from the KHL following the 2016–17 season, due to the club's debt on July 4, 2017. With Dynamo unwilling to offer an improved contract, Galimov left to sign a two-year contract with Avangard Omsk the following day on July 5, 2017.

On 8 May 2020, Galimov agreed to a one-year contract with his seventh KHL club in HC Sochi.
