= Aleksandr Golovin =

Aleksandr Golovin may refer to:

- Aleksandr Golovin (artist) (1863–1930), Russian artist and stage designer
- Alexander Vasiliyevich Golovin (born 1949), Russian diplomat and ambassador
- Aleksandr Golovin (footballer) (born 1996), Russian football player
- Alexander Golovin (ice hockey) (born 1983), Russian ice hockey player
- Aleksandr Golovin (wrestler) (born 1995), Russian Greco-Roman junior wrestler, silver world cup
