= Vadim Tarasov =

Kazakhstani-Russian ice hockey player

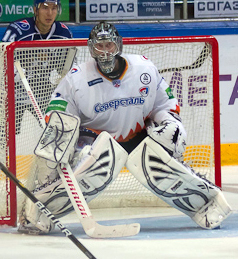
- Vadim Tarasov as a Severstal Cherepovets player in the 2011-12 KHL season.
- Born: December 31, 1976 (age 49) Ust-Kamenogorsk, Kazakh SSR, Soviet Union
- Height: 6 ft 0 in (183 cm)
- Weight: 185 lb (84 kg; 13 st 3 lb)
- Position: Goaltender
- Caught: Left
- Played for: Torpedo Ust-Kamenogorsk; Quebec Citadelles; Neftekhimik Nizhnekamsk; Severstal Cherepovets; Salavat Yulaev Ufa; Metallurg Novokuznetsk
- National team: Russia
- NHL draft: 196th overall, 1999; Montreal Canadiens
- Playing career: 1992–2013

Vadim Gennadievich Tarasov (Russian: Вадим Геннадьевич Тарасов; born December 31, 1976) is a retired Kazakhstani-Russian professional ice hockey goaltender.

Tarasov was drafted 196th overall by the Montreal Canadiens in the 1999 NHL entry draft and after two seasons with Metallurg Novokuznetsk he signed a contract in 2001 and was assigned to their AHL affiliate the Quebec Citadelles, but played in only 14 regular season games and returned to Russia the next season, re-joining Metallurg Novokuznetsk. He remained with the team until 2006 where he signed for Salavat Yulaev Ufa.

His son, Daniil, is a professional ice hockey goaltender who was drafted 86th overall by the Columbus Blue Jackets in the third round of the 2017 NHL entry draft, and currently with the Detroit Red Wings.
