= Ice Palace (Cherepovets) =

Multi-purpose arena in Cherepovets, Russia

Coordinates: 59°5′18″N 37°55′11″E

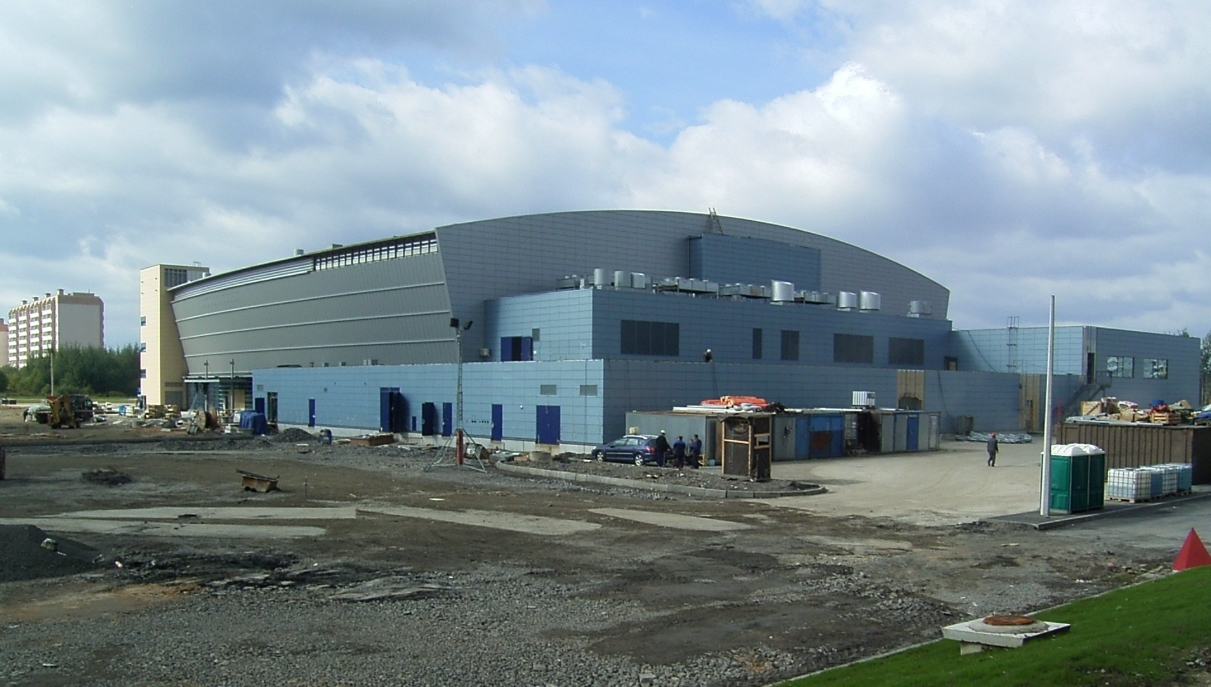
- Ice Palace in 2006.
- Interactive map of Ice Palace
- Location: Cherepovets, Russia
- Owner: City of Cherepovets
- Capacity: Ice hockey: 5,536
- Surface: multi

Construction
- Groundbreaking: April 8, 2005
- Built: 2005–07
- Opened: November 26, 2006
- Cost: 4,5 billion RUB (60 million Euro)
- Architect: Skanska

Tenants
- Severstal Cherepovets (KHL), from 2007); Almaz Cherepovets (MHL)

Website
- arena-che.ru

The Ice Palace is a 6,000-seat multi-purpose arena in Cherepovets, Russia. It was opened in 2007. It replaced Sports-Concert Hall Almaz as the home of Russian ice hockey team Severstal Cherepovets.

== History ==
The decision to build a new ice arena was made in 2003. It was first announced by the governor of the Vologda Region Vyacheslav Pozgalev at the opening of the hockey season on September 12, 2003 after Severstal's victory over Metallurg Novokuznetsk. April 8, 2005 Vyacheslav Pozgalev took part in the ceremony of laying the first stone.

The palace was built by Skanska, which has previously been involved in the construction of ice sports complexes in St. Petersburg and Yaroslavl. At first, the sports complex was supposed to be called "Olympic", but this name was not liked by many Cherepovets and the International Olympic Committee.

On November 4, 2006, on the Day of the City of Cherepovets, the Ice Palace received its first visitors. Honored Master of Sports Vladislav Tretyak, President of the Russian Ski Racing Federation Vladimir Loginov were guests of honor at the opening ceremony. Olympic champions in figure skating Tatyana Navka and Roman Kostomarov took part in the gala concert.

The first hockey match at the new arena took place on November 15, 2006 between the teams Severstal and Siberia and ended with a score of 5:3 in favor of the hosts.

== List of concerts ==
- Danko
- Lesopoval
- Mikhail Shufutinsky
- Igor Nikolayev
- Lyube
- Edwin Marton
- Vladimir Kuzmin
- Lera Masskva
- Korni band
- band Fabrika
- Ottawan
- Sergey Minayev
- Bad Boys Blue
- Eros Band
- Alexander Buinov
- Nikolai Noskov
- band Bi-2
- MakSim
- band Mirage
- Technology band
- Morandi
- Accent
- group Zolotoe_Koltso
- Boney M.
- Stas Mikhailov
- Grigory Leps
- Mashina Vremeni
- Group DDT
- Philip Kirkorov
- Group "Leningrad"

== See also ==
- List of indoor arenas in Russia
- List of Kontinental Hockey League arenas
