= Nikita Vyglazov =

Russian ice hockey player

- Born: October 28, 1985 (age 40) Olenegorsk, Russian SFSR
- Height: 6 ft 0 in (183 cm)
- Weight: 205 lb (93 kg; 14 st 9 lb)
- Position: Right wing
- Shoots: Right
- KHL team Former teams: Free Agent; SKA Saint Petersburg; Khimik-SKA Novopolotsk; HC Dinamo Minsk; Avangard Omsk; Metallurg Novokuznetsk; Avtomobilist Yekaterinburg; HC Vityaz; HC Sochi
- Playing career: 2004–present

Nikita Vyglazov (born October 28, 1985) is a Russian professional ice hockey forward who is currently an unrestricted free agent. He most recently played for HC Sochi of the Kontinental Hockey League (KHL).

Vyglazov made his Kontinental Hockey League (KHL) debut playing with Avangard Omsk during the inaugural 2008–09 KHL season.
