= Alexei Kosourov =

Russian ice hockey player

- Born: June 29, 1979 (age 45); Penza, Russian SFSR, USSR
- Height: 5 ft 10 in (178 cm)
- Weight: 194 lb (88 kg; 13 st 12 lb)
- Position: Forward
- Shoots: Left
- VHL team Former teams: Dizel Penza; Molot-Prikamie Perm; Ak Bars Kazan; CSKA Moscow; Torpedo Nizhny Novgorod; Metallurg Novokuznetsk; Amur Khabarovsk
- Playing career: 1999–present

Alexei Kosourov (born July 29, 1979) is a Russian professional ice hockey player who currently plays for the Dizel Penza of the Supreme Hockey League (VHL).

Kosourov made his Kontinental Hockey League (KHL) debut playing with Torpedo Nizhny Novgorod during the inaugural 2008–09 KHL season.
