= Sports-Concert Hall Almaz =

Coordinates: 59°7′27″N 37°54′11″E

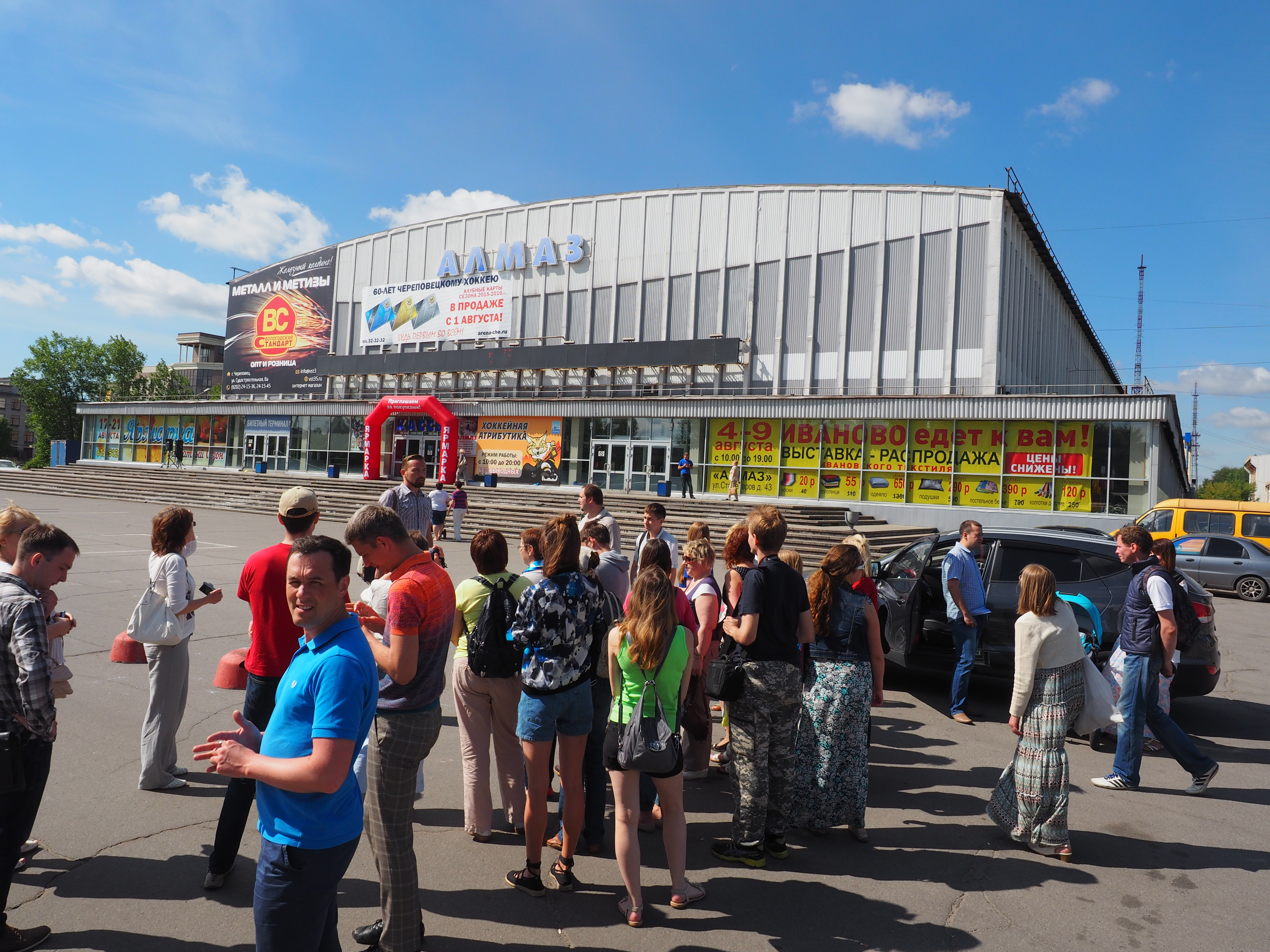
Almaz

Sports-Concert Hall Almaz is an indoor sporting arena located in Cherepovets, Russia. The capacity of the arena is 3,500. It is the former home arena of the Severstal Cherepovets ice hockey team, which has since moved to the Ice Palace.

The arena was opened in 1970. The name refers to Almaz (diamond), the call sign of the cosmonaut Pavel Belyayev during his 1965 orbital flight. The arena was built by the Severstal Steel Plant, and the plant decided to have a popular vote for the name. The shortlist contained three names, Almaz, Kristall, and Sheksna, of which Almaz was selected by the jury.
