= Dmitri Kagarlitsky =

Russian ice hockey player (born 1989)

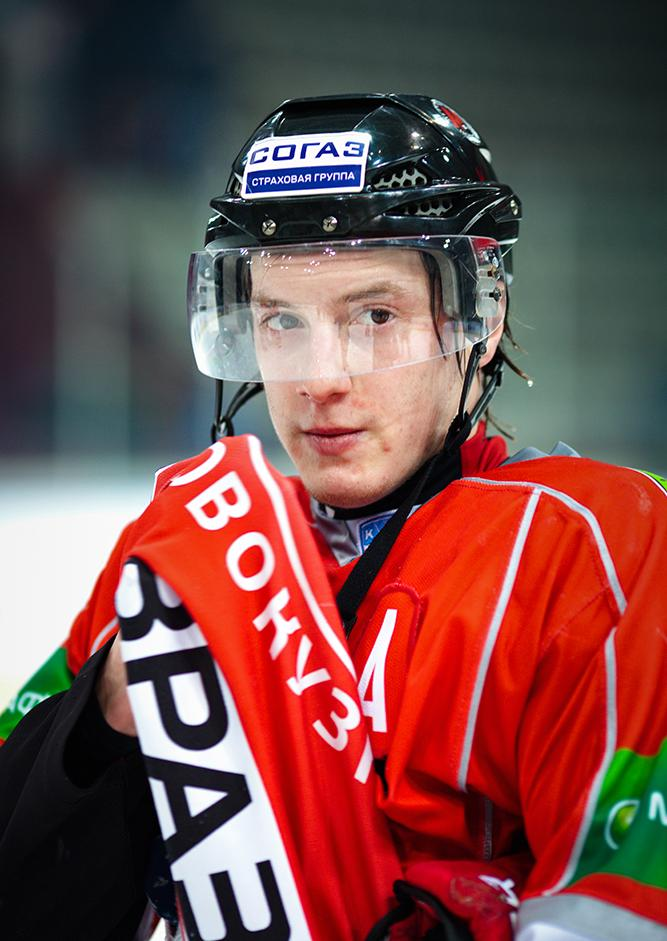
- Born: 1 August 1989 (age 37) Cherepovets, Russian SFSR, USSR
- Height: 5 ft 9 in (175 cm)
- Weight: 168 lb (76 kg; 12 st 0 lb)
- Position: Right wing
- Shoots: Right
- KHL team Former teams: HC Sochi; Metallurg Novokuznetsk; Atlant Moscow Oblast; HC Donbass; Severstal Cherepovets; Dynamo Moscow; SKA Saint Petersburg; Ak Bars Kazan; Torpedo Nizhny Novgorod
- Playing career: 2007–present

Dmitri Sergeyevich Kagarlitsky (Russian: Дмитрий Сергеевич Кагарлицкий; born 1 August 1989) is a Russian professional ice hockey right winger who currently plays for HC Sochi of the Kontinental Hockey League (KHL).

== Playing career ==
Kagarlitsky formerly played for four seasons with Severstal Cherepovets, before leaving as a free agent at the conclusion of the 2017–18 campaign, to sign a one-year contract as a free agent with his fifth KHL club, Dynamo Moscow, on 17 May 2018.

After a season stint with SKA Saint Petersburg in 2019–20, Kagarlitsky was returned to Dynamo Moscow in a trade on 1 June 2020.

As a free agent, Kagarlitsky left Dynamo and signed a one-year contract with Ak Bars Kazan on 24 May 2021.
