= Alexander Komaristy =

Ukrainian-Russian ice hockey player

- Born: October 2, 1989 (age 36) Severodonetsk, Ukrainian SSR, Soviet Union
- Height: 5 ft 9 in (175 cm)
- Weight: 183 lb (83 kg; 13 st 1 lb)
- Position: Center
- Shoots: Left
- VHL team Former teams: Dinamo Saint Petersburg; HC Vityaz; Spartak Moscow; HC Neftekhimik Nizhnekamsk; Metallurg Novokuznetsk; HC Yugra
- Playing career: 2006–present

Oleksandr Komarystyi (Ukrainian: Олександр Комаристий; Russian: Александр Комаристый; born October 2, 1989) is a Ukrainian-Russian professional ice hockey center who plays for HC Dinamo Saint Petersburg in the Supreme Hockey League (VHL).

He formerly joined Metallurg Novokuznetsk as a free agent after a successful try-out period on August 19, 2014, having played the previous season with HC Neftekhimik Nizhnekamsk.
