= Switzerland men's national ice hockey team =

Men's national ice hockey team representing Switzerland

Switzerland
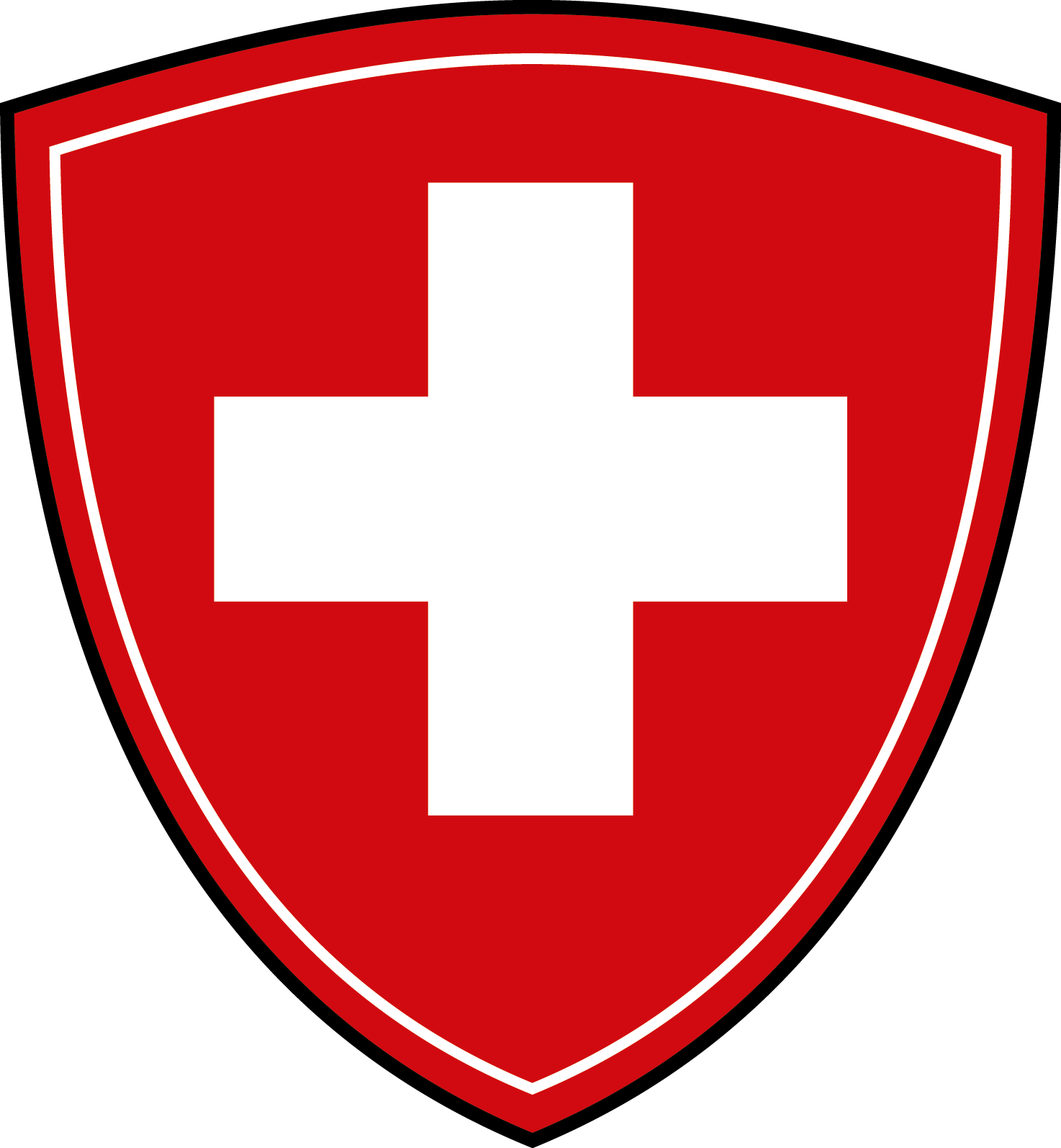
- Nickname: La Nati, Die Nati, Eisgenossen
- Association: Schweizerischer Eishockeyverband
- General manager: Lars Weibel
- Head coach: Jan Cadieux
- Assistants: Rikard Franzén; Marcel Jenni
- Captain: Roman Josi
- Most games: Andres Ambühl (352)
- Top scorer: Jörg Eberle (79)
- Most points: Andres Ambühl (156)
- Team colors
- IIHF code: SUI
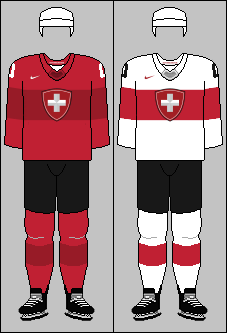

Ranking
- Current IIHF: 1 ▲2 (3 June 2026)
- Highest IIHF: 1 (2026)
- Lowest IIHF: 9 (2003–04, 2012)

First international
- Great Britain 3–0 Switzerland (Chamonix, France; 23 January 1909)

Biggest win
- Switzerland 23–0 Yugoslavia (Zurich, Switzerland; 4 February 1939)

Biggest defeat
- Canada 33–0 Switzerland (Chamonix, France; 30 January 1924)

Olympics
- Appearances: 19 (first in 1920)
- Medals: (1928, 1948)

IIHF World Championships
- Appearances: 75 (first in 1930)
- Best result: (silver) (1935, 2013, 2018, 2024, 2025, 2026)

European Championships
- Appearances: 8 (first in 1910)
- Best result: (gold) (1926)

International record (W–L–T)
- 708–747–116

Medal record

Olympic Games
| Bronze medal – third place | 1928 St. Moritz | Team |
| Bronze medal – third place | 1948 St. Moritz | Team |

World Championship
| Silver medal – second place | 1935 Switzerland | |
| Silver medal – second place | 2013 Sweden/Finland | |
| Silver medal – second place | 2018 Denmark | |
| Silver medal – second place | 2024 Czech Republic | |
| Silver medal – second place | 2025 Sweden/Denmark | |
| Silver medal – second place | 2026 Switzerland | |
| Bronze medal – third place | 1930 Austria/France/Germany | |
| Bronze medal – third place | 1937 Great Britain | |
| Bronze medal – third place | 1939 Switzerland | |
| Bronze medal – third place | 1950 Great Britain | |
| Bronze medal – third place | 1951 France | |
| Bronze medal – third place | 1953 Switzerland | |

Pool B / Division I
| Gold medal – first place | 1971 Switzerland | |
| Gold medal – first place | 1986 Netherlands | |
| Gold medal – first place | 1990 France | |
| Gold medal – first place | 1994 Denmark | |

The Switzerland men's national ice hockey team (German: Schweizer Eishockeynationalmannschaft; French: Équipe de Suisse de hockey sur glace; Italian: Nazionale di hockey su ghiaccio della Svizzera) is a founding member of the International Ice Hockey Federation (IIHF) and is controlled by the Swiss Ice Hockey Federation.

As of June 2026, the Swiss team is ranked 1st in the IIHF World Rankings.

== History ==
Bibi Torriani served as the Switzerland national team captain from 1933 to 1939. He played on a forward line known as "The ni-storm" (German: Der ni-sturm), with brothers Hans Cattini and Ferdinand Cattini. The line was named for the last syllable (-ni) of players' surnames. The ni-storm was regarded as the top line of HC Davos and Switzerland's national hockey team. Torriani served as head coach of the Switzerland men's national ice hockey team in 1946–47, and again from 1948 to 1949 to 1951–52. Canadian-born Derek Holmes was the team's player-coach in the 1960s.

From a bronze medal at the 1953 World Championships until the silver medal in 2013 and 2018, Switzerland did not win a medal at a major senior ice hockey tournament, coming close in 1992 and 1998, when they finished in fourth place in the World Championships both years.

Before the 2013 IIHF World Championship, the Switzerland scored two historic upsets at the 2006 Winter Olympics in Turin, defeating the Czech Republic 3–2 and shutting out Canada 2–0 two days later. They finally fell to Sweden in the quarterfinals. At the 2010 Winter Olympics in Vancouver, the Swiss nearly stunned Canada again in round-robin play, taking the heavily favored Canadians to a shootout, which they lost 1–0 for a narrow 3–2 loss.

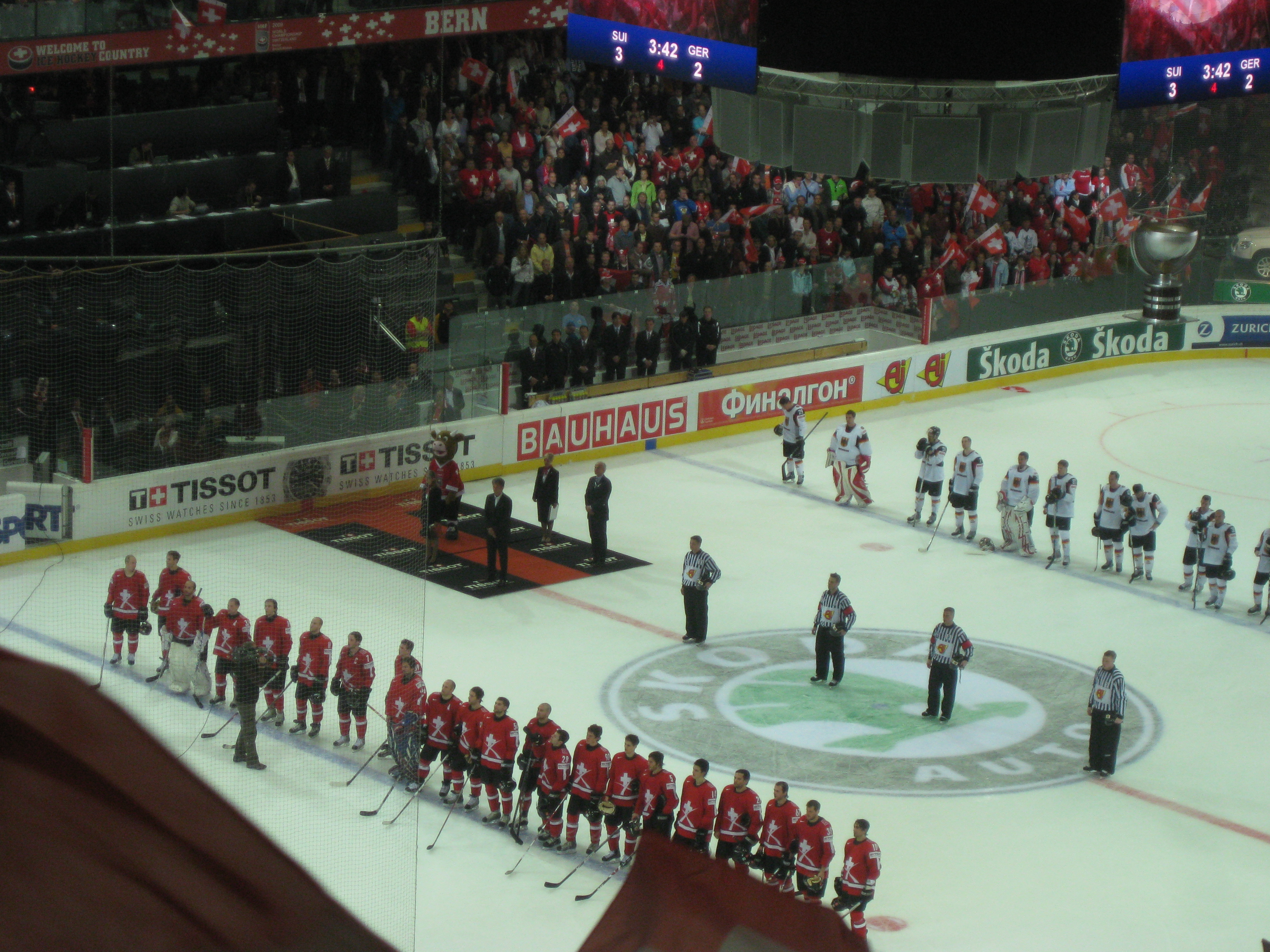
The national ice hockey teams of Switzerland and Germany.

== Tournament record ==
=== Olympic Games ===
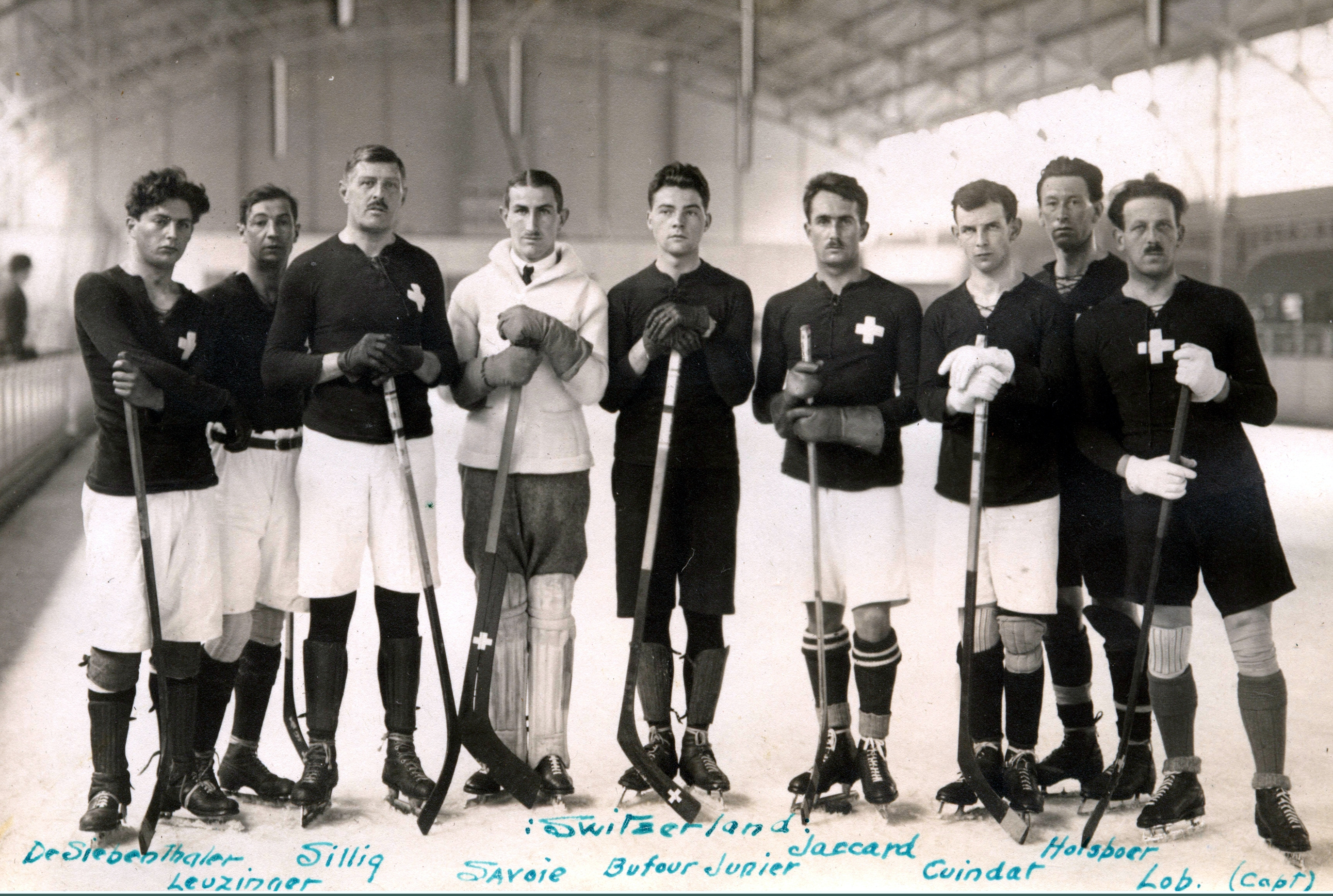
1920 Olympics Swiss Ice Hockey Team

| Year | Result | | | |
|---|---|---|---|---|
| (Belgium) 1920 | 5th place (tied) | | | |
| (France) 1924 | 8th place | | | |
| (Switzerland) 1928 | Bronze | | | |
| (United States) 1932 | did not participate | | | |
| (Germany) 1936 | 12th place | | | |
| (Switzerland) 1948 | Bronze | | | |
| (Norway) 1952 | 5th place | | | |
| (Italy) 1956 | 9th place | | | |
| (United States) 1960 | did not participate | | | |
| (Austria) 1964 | 8th place | | | |
| (France) 1968 | did not participate | | | |
| (Japan) 1972 | 10th place | | | |
| (Austria) 1976 | 11th place | | | |
| (United States) 1980 | did not participate | | | |
| (Socialist Federal Republic of Yugoslavia) 1984 | did not participate | | | |
| (Canada) 1988 | 8th place | | | |
| (France) 1992 | 10th place | | | |
| (Norway) 1994 | did not participate | | | |
| (Japan) 1998 | did not participate | | | |
| (United States) 2002 | 11th place | | | |
| (Italy) 2006 | 6th place | | | |
| (Canada) 2010 | 8th place | | | |
| (Russia) 2014 | 9th place | | | |
| (South Korea) 2018 | 10th place | | | |
| (China) 2022 | 8th place | | | |
| (Italy) 2026 | 5th place | | | |
Totals
| Games | Gold | Silver | Bronze | Total |
| 19 | 0 | 0 | 2 | 2 |

=== World Championship ===
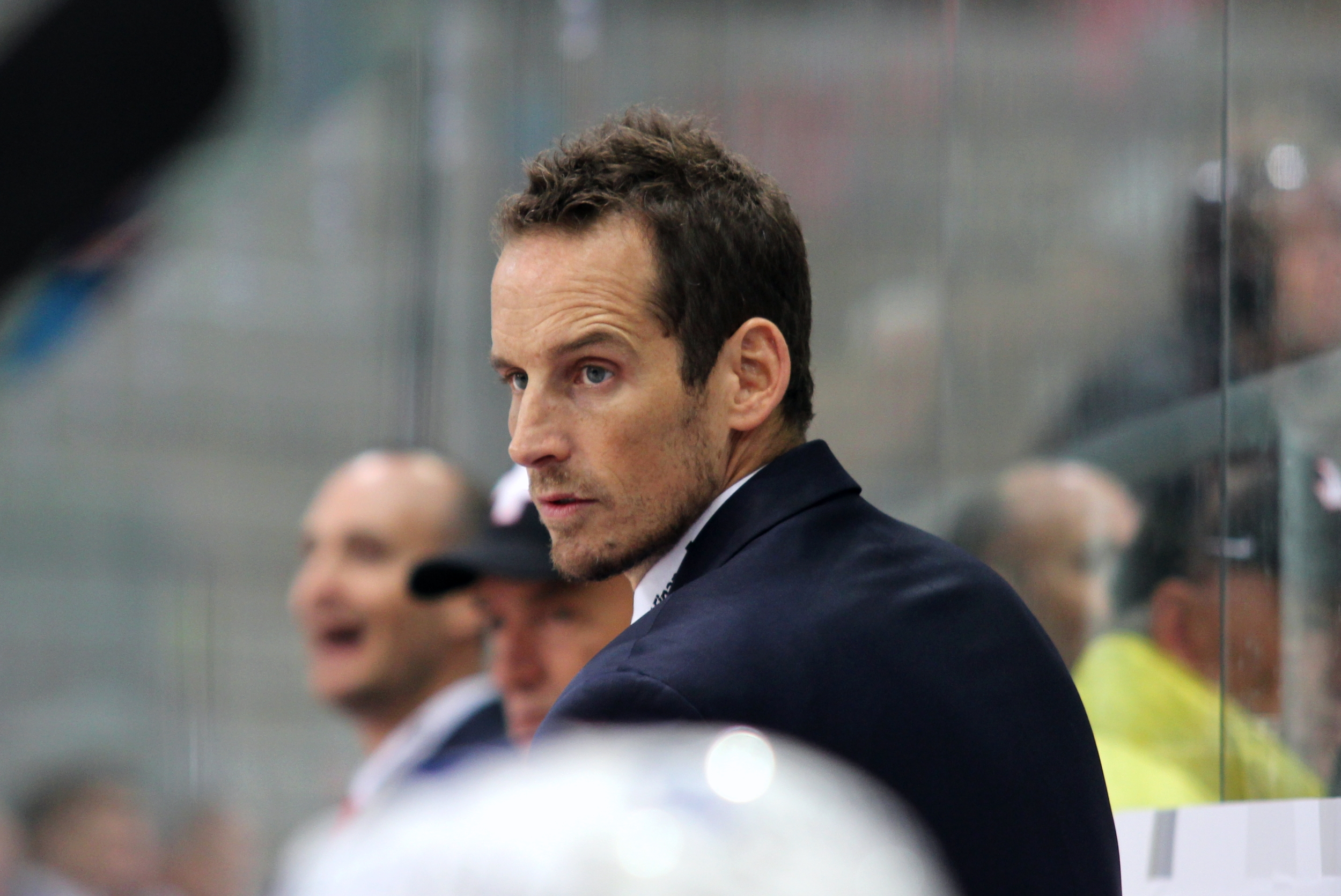
Patrick Fischer

- 1930 – Won bronze medal
- 1933 – Finished tied in 5th place
- 1934 – Finished in 4th place
- 1935 – Won silver medal
- 1937 – Won bronze medal
- 1938 – Finished in 6th place
- 1939 – Won bronze medal
- 1947 – Finished in 4th place
- 1949 – Finished in 5th place
- 1950 – Won bronze medal awarded Silver as European Champion
- 1951 – Won bronze medal
- 1953 – Won bronze medal
- 1954 – Finished in 7th place
- 1955 – Finished in 8th place
- 1959 – Finished in 12th place
- 1961 – Finished in 11th place (3rd in Pool B)
- 1962 – Finished in 7th place
- 1963 – Finished in 10th place (2nd in Pool B)
- 1965 – Finished in 10th place (2nd in Pool B)
- 1966 – Finished in 14th place (6th in Pool B)
- 1967 – Finished in 15th place (7th in Pool B)
- 1969 – Finished in 16th place (2nd in Pool C)
- 1970 – Finished in 12th place (6th in Pool B)
- 1971 – Finished in 7th place (won Pool B)
- 1972 – Finished in 6th place
- 1973 – Finished in 13th place (7th in Pool B)
- 1974 – Finished in 15th place (won Pool C)
- 1975 – Finished in 9th place (2nd in Pool B)
- 1976 – Finished in 12th place (4th in Pool B)
- 1977 – Finished in 13th place (5th in Pool B)
- 1978 – Finished in 11th place (3rd in Pool B)
- 1979 – Finished in 13th place (5th in Pool B)
- 1981 – Finished in 11th place (3rd in Pool B)
- 1982 – Finished in 14th place (6th in Pool B)
- 1983 – Finished in 14th place (6th in Pool B)
- 1985 – Finished in 10th place (2nd in Pool B)
- 1986 – Finished in 9th place (won Pool B)
- 1987 – Finished in 8th place
- 1989 – Finished in 12th place (4th in Pool B)
- 1990 – Finished in 9th place (won Pool B)
- 1991 – Finished in 7th place
- 1992 – Finished in 4th place
- 1993 – Finished in 10th place
- 1994 – Finished in 13th place (won Pool B)
- 1995 – Finished in 12th place
- 1996 – Finished in 14th place (2nd in Pool B)
- 1997 – Finished in 15th place (3rd in Pool B)
- 1998 – Finished in 4th place
- 1999 – Finished in 8th place
- 2000 – Finished in 6th place
- 2001 – Finished in 9th place
- 2002 – Finished in 10th place
- 2003 – Finished in 8th place
- 2004 – Finished in 8th place
- 2005 – Finished in 8th place
- 2006 – Finished in 9th place
- 2007 – Finished in 8th place
- 2008 – Finished in 7th place
- 2009 – Finished in 9th place
- 2010 – Finished in 5th place
- 2011 – Finished in 9th place
- 2012 – Finished in 11th place
- 2013 – Won silver medal
- 2014 – Finished in 10th place
- 2015 – Finished in 8th place
- 2016 – Finished in 11th place
- 2017 – Finished in 6th place
- 2018 – Won silver medal
- 2019 – Finished in 8th place
- 2020 – Cancelled due to the coronavirus pandemic
- 2021 – Finished in 6th place
- 2022 – Finished in 5th place
- 2023 – Finished in 5th place
- 2024 – Won silver medal
- 2025 – Won silver medal
- 2026 – Won silver medal
- 2027 –

=== European Championship ===
| Games | GP | W | T | L | GF | GA | Coach | Captain | Finish | Rank |
|---|---|---|---|---|---|---|---|---|---|---|
| (Switzerland) 1910 Les Avants | 3 | 0 | 0 | 3 | 2 | 15 | ? | ? | Round-robin | 4th |
| (German Empire) 1911 Berlin | 3 | 0 | 0 | 3 | 4 | 28 | ? | ? | Round-robin | 4th |
| (Austria-Hungary) 1912 Prague* | did not participate | | | | | | | | | |
| (German Empire) 1913 Munich | did not participate | | | | | | | | | |
| (German Empire) 1914 Berlin | did not participate | | | | | | | | | |
| 1915–1920 | No Championships (World War I). | | | | | | | | | |
| (Sweden) 1921 Stockholm | did not participate | | | | | | | | | |
| (Switzerland) 1922 St. Moritz | 2 | 0 | 0 | 2 | 1 | 15 | ? | ? | Round-robin | 3rd place, bronze medalist(s) |
| (Belgium) 1923 Antwerp | 4 | 0 | 0 | 4 | 7 | 23 | ? | ? | Round-robin | 4th |
| (Italy) 1924 Milan | did not participate | | | | | | | | | |
| (Czechoslovakia) 1925 Štrbské Pleso, Starý Smokovec | 3 | 0 | 2 | 1 | 3 | 4 | ? | ? | Round-robin | 3rd place, bronze medalist(s) |
| (Switzerland) 1926 Davos | 7 | 5 | 1 | 1 | 35 | 15 | ? | ? | Final round | 1st place, gold medalist(s) |
| (Austria) 1927 Wien | did not participate | | | | | | | | | |
| (Hungary) 1929 Budapest | 3 | 1 | 0 | 2 | 2 | 5 | ? | ? | Second round | 5th |
| (Germany) 1932 Berlin | 6 | 1 | 5 | 0 | 10 | 9 | ? | ? | Final round | 3rd place, bronze medalist(s) |

=== Spengler Cup ===
- 1964 – Finished in 4th place
- 1967 – Won bronze medal
- 1968 – Finished in 4th place
- 1972 – Finished in 4th place
- 1974 – Finished in 4th place
- 1975 – Finished in 4th place
- 1976 – Won bronze medal
- 1977 – Finished in 5th place
- 1978 – Finished in 5th place
- 1979 – Finished in 5th place
- 2017 – Won silver medal

=== Deutschland Cup ===
- (gold) Gold medal (2001, 2007, 2019)

=== Euro Hockey Tour ===
- 2022–23 – Finished in 4th place
- 2023–24 – Finished in 4th place
- 2024–25 – Finished in (bronze)
- 2025–26 – Finished in 4th place
- 2026–27 –

== Team ==
=== Current roster ===
Roster for the 2026 IIHF World Championship.

Head coach: Jan Cadieux

| No. | Pos. | Name | Height | Weight | Birthdate | Team |
|---|---|---|---|---|---|---|
| 8 | F | Simon Knak | 1.86 m (6 ft 1 in) | 92 kg (203 lb) | 27 January 2002 (age 24) | (Switzerland) HC Davos |
| 9 | F | Damien Riat | 1.83 m (6 ft 0 in) | 85 kg (187 lb) | 26 February 1997 (age 29) | (Switzerland) Lausanne HC |
| 13 | F | Nico Hischier | 1.86 m (6 ft 1 in) | 91 kg (201 lb) | 4 January 1999 (age 27) | (United States) New Jersey Devils |
| 14 | D | Dean Kukan | 1.87 m (6 ft 2 in) | 89 kg (196 lb) | 8 July 1993 (age 33) | (Switzerland) ZSC Lions |
| 17 | F | Ken Jäger | 1.86 m (6 ft 1 in) | 83 kg (183 lb) | 30 May 1998 (age 28) | (Switzerland) Lausanne HC |
| 18 | D | Sven Jung | 1.87 m (6 ft 2 in) | 88 kg (194 lb) | 5 January 1995 (age 31) | (Switzerland) HC Davos |
| 20 | G | Reto Berra | 1.95 m (6 ft 5 in) | 100 kg (220 lb) | 3 January 1987 (age 39) | (Switzerland) HC Fribourg-Gottéron |
| 22 | F | Nino Niederreiter – A | 1.88 m (6 ft 2 in) | 97 kg (214 lb) | 8 September 1992 (age 34) | (Canada) Winnipeg Jets |
| 26 | G | Sandro Aeschlimann | 1.84 m (6 ft 0 in) | 84 kg (185 lb) | 26 December 1994 (age 31) | (Switzerland) HC Davos |
| 28 | F | Timo Meier | 1.87 m (6 ft 2 in) | 100 kg (220 lb) | 8 October 1996 (age 30) | (United States) New Jersey Devils |
| 38 | D | Lukas Frick | 1.88 m (6 ft 2 in) | 91 kg (201 lb) | 15 September 1994 (age 32) | (Switzerland) HC Davos |
| 44 | F | Pius Suter | 1.80 m (5 ft 11 in) | 80 kg (180 lb) | 24 May 1996 (age 30) | (United States) St. Louis Blues |
| 54 | D | Christian Marti | 1.90 m (6 ft 3 in) | 98 kg (216 lb) | 29 March 1993 (age 33) | (Switzerland) ZSC Lions |
| 56 | D | Tim Berni | 1.83 m (6 ft 0 in) | 87 kg (192 lb) | 11 February 2000 (age 26) | (Switzerland) Genève-Servette Hockey Club |
| 62 | F | Denis Malgin | 1.75 m (5 ft 9 in) | 81 kg (179 lb) | 18 January 1997 (age 29) | (Switzerland) ZSC Lions |
| 63 | G | Leonardo Genoni | 1.83 m (6 ft 0 in) | 86 kg (190 lb) | 28 August 1987 (age 39) | (Switzerland) EV Zug |
| 72 | D | Dominik Egli | 1.74 m (5 ft 9 in) | 81 kg (179 lb) | 20 August 1998 (age 28) | (Sweden) Frölunda HC |
| 79 | F | Calvin Thürkauf | 1.87 m (6 ft 2 in) | 97 kg (214 lb) | 27 June 1997 (age 29) | (Switzerland) HC Lugano |
| 80 | F | Nicolas Baechler | 1.88 m (6 ft 2 in) | 92 kg (203 lb) | 23 August 2003 (age 23) | (Switzerland) ZSC Lions |
| 85 | F | Sven Andrighetto | 1.77 m (5 ft 10 in) | 84 kg (185 lb) | 21 March 1993 (age 33) | (Switzerland) ZSC Lions |
| 86 | D | J. J. Moser – A | 1.88 m (6 ft 2 in) | 83 kg (183 lb) | 6 June 2000 (age 26) | (United States) Tampa Bay Lightning |
| 88 | F | Christoph Bertschy | 1.77 m (5 ft 10 in) | 84 kg (185 lb) | 5 April 1994 (age 32) | (Switzerland) HC Fribourg-Gottéron |
| 90 | D | Roman Josi – C | 1.87 m (6 ft 2 in) | 91 kg (201 lb) | 1 June 1990 (age 36) | (United States) Nashville Predators |
| 93 | F | Théo Rochette | 1.80 m (5 ft 11 in) | 78 kg (172 lb) | 20 February 2002 (age 24) | (Switzerland) Lausanne HC |
| 94 | F | Attilio Biasca | 1.86 m (6 ft 1 in) | 89 kg (196 lb) | 18 March 2003 (age 23) | (Switzerland) HC Fribourg-Gottéron |

=== 2026 Olympics roster ===
The first six players of Switzerland's roster were announced on 16 June 2025. The rest of the roster was announced on 7 January 2026. On 10 February, Roman Josi was named Switzerland's captain, with Kevin Fiala, Andrea Glauser, Nico Hischier, and Nino Niederreiter named alternate captains.

Head coach: Patrick Fischer

| No. | Pos. | Name | Height | Weight | Birthdate | Team |
|---|---|---|---|---|---|---|
| 8 | F | Simon Knak | 1.85 m (6 ft 1 in) | 92 kg (203 lb) | 27 January 2002 (aged 24) | (Switzerland) HC Davos |
| 9 | F | Damien Riat | 1.83 m (6 ft 0 in) | 85 kg (187 lb) | 26 February 1997 (aged 28) | (Switzerland) Lausanne HC |
| 13 | F | Nico Hischier – A | 1.85 m (6 ft 1 in) | 91 kg (201 lb) | 4 January 1999 (aged 27) | (United States) New Jersey Devils |
| 14 | D | Dean Kukan | 1.88 m (6 ft 2 in) | 89 kg (196 lb) | 8 July 1993 (aged 32) | (Switzerland) ZSC Lions |
| 17 | F | Ken Jäger | 1.85 m (6 ft 1 in) | 83 kg (183 lb) | 30 May 1998 (aged 27) | (Switzerland) Lausanne HC |
| 20 | G | Reto Berra | 1.96 m (6 ft 5 in) | 100 kg (220 lb) | 3 January 1987 (aged 39) | (Switzerland) HC Fribourg-Gottéron |
| 21 | F | Kevin Fiala – A | 1.80 m (5 ft 11 in) | 93 kg (205 lb) | 22 July 1996 (aged 29) | (United States) Los Angeles Kings |
| 22 | F | Nino Niederreiter – A | 1.88 m (6 ft 2 in) | 99 kg (218 lb) | 8 September 1992 (aged 33) | (Canada) Winnipeg Jets |
| 23 | F | Philipp Kurashev | 1.83 m (6 ft 0 in) | 86 kg (190 lb) | 12 October 1999 (aged 26) | (United States) San Jose Sharks |
| 28 | F | Timo Meier | 1.83 m (6 ft 0 in) | 100 kg (220 lb) | 8 October 1996 (aged 29) | (United States) New Jersey Devils |
| 40 | G | Akira Schmid | 1.96 m (6 ft 5 in) | 86 kg (190 lb) | 12 May 2000 (aged 25) | (United States) Vegas Golden Knights |
| 43 | D | Andrea Glauser – A | 1.83 m (6 ft 0 in) | 86 kg (190 lb) | 3 April 1996 (aged 29) | (Switzerland) HC Fribourg-Gottéron |
| 44 | F | Pius Suter | 1.80 m (5 ft 11 in) | 80 kg (176 lb) | 24 May 1996 (aged 29) | (United States) St. Louis Blues |
| 45 | D | Michael Fora | 1.93 m (6 ft 4 in) | 97 kg (214 lb) | 30 October 1995 (aged 30) | (Switzerland) HC Davos |
| 54 | D | Christian Marti | 1.91 m (6 ft 3 in) | 98 kg (216 lb) | 29 March 1993 (aged 32) | (Switzerland) ZSC Lions |
| 56 | D | Tim Berni | 1.83 m (6 ft 0 in) | 87 kg (192 lb) | 11 February 2000 (aged 26) | (Switzerland) Genève-Servette HC |
| 62 | F | Denis Malgin | 1.75 m (5 ft 9 in) | 81 kg (179 lb) | 18 January 1997 (aged 29) | (Switzerland) ZSC Lions |
| 63 | G | Leonardo Genoni | 1.83 m (6 ft 0 in) | 86 kg (190 lb) | 28 August 1987 (aged 38) | (Switzerland) EV Zug |
| 71 | D | Jonas Siegenthaler | 1.88 m (6 ft 2 in) | 99 kg (218 lb) | 6 May 1997 (aged 28) | (United States) New Jersey Devils |
| 73 | F | Sandro Schmid | 1.80 m (5 ft 11 in) | 82 kg (181 lb) | 3 June 2000 (aged 25) | (Switzerland) HC Fribourg-Gottéron |
| 79 | F | Calvin Thürkauf | 1.88 m (6 ft 2 in) | 97 kg (214 lb) | 27 June 1997 (aged 28) | (Switzerland) HC Lugano |
| 85 | F | Sven Andrighetto | 1.78 m (5 ft 10 in) | 84 kg (185 lb) | 21 March 1992 (aged 33) | (Switzerland) ZSC Lions |
| 86 | D | J.J. Moser | 1.88 m (6 ft 2 in) | 83 kg (183 lb) | 6 June 2000 (aged 25) | (United States) Tampa Bay Lightning |
| 88 | F | Christoph Bertschy | 1.78 m (5 ft 10 in) | 84 kg (185 lb) | 5 April 1994 (aged 31) | (Switzerland) HC Fribourg-Gottéron |
| 90 | D | Roman Josi – C | 1.88 m (6 ft 2 in) | 91 kg (201 lb) | 1 June 1990 (aged 35) | (United States) Nashville Predators |

== Uniform evolution ==
National team jerseys

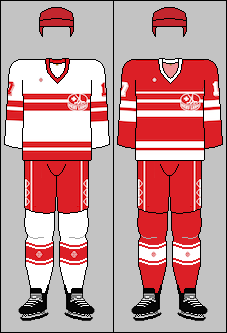
1988 Olympic jerseys

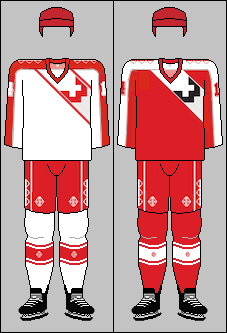
1992 Olympic and 1991–1993 IIHF jerseys

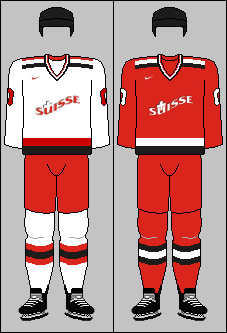
1998 Olympic and 1999–2000 IIHF jerseys

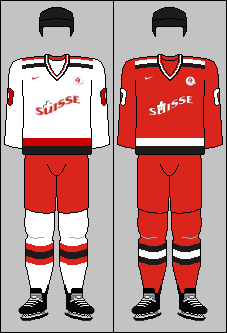
1998 IIHF jerseys

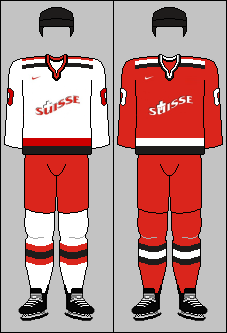
2001–2004 IIHF and 2002 Olympic jerseys

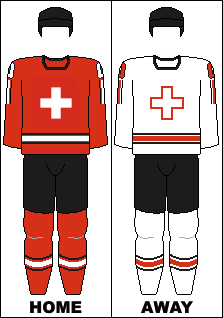
former jerseys

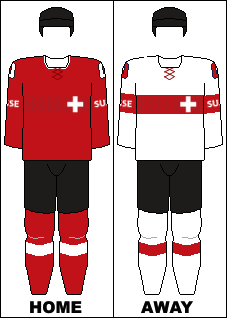
2014 Olympic jerseys

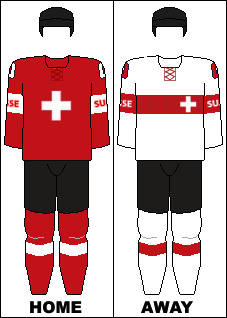
2014–2016 IIHF jerseys

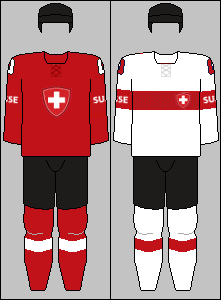
2017 IIHF jerseys

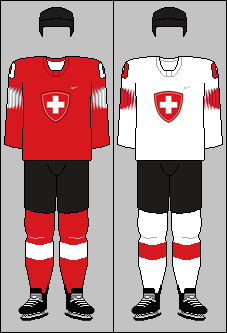
2018 Olympic jerseys

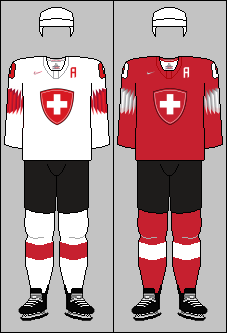
2018–2021 IIHF jerseys

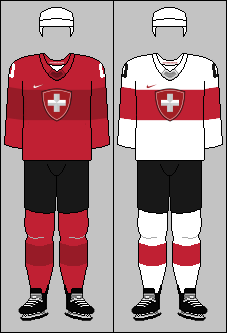
2022 Olympic jerseys
