= Alexander Golovin (ice hockey) =

Russian ice hockey player

- Born: 26 March 1983 (age 43) Ust-Kamenogorsk, Kazakh SSR
- Height: 5 ft 10 in (178 cm)
- Weight: 194 lb (88 kg; 13 st 12 lb)
- Position: Left wing
- Shot: Right
- PHL team Former teams: PKH Gdańsk; Avangard Omsk; Sibir Novosibirsk; Ak Bars Kazan; SKA St. Petersburg; Metallurg Novokuznetsk; Spartak Moscow; HC Yugra; Avtomobilist Yekaterinburg; HC Sakhalin; HSC Csíkszereda; Orlik Opole
- NHL draft: 174th overall, 2001; Chicago Blackhawks
- Playing career: 2002–2020

Alexander Sergeyevich Golovin (Russian: Александр Сергеевич Головин; born 26 March 1983) is a Russian professional ice hockey winger, born in Kazakh SSR, who currently plays for PKH Gdańsk in the Polska Hokej Liga (PHL).

== Career ==
Golovin was selected by the Chicago Blackhawks in the sixth round (174th overall) of the 2001 NHL entry draft. He previously played in the Russian Superleague and Kontinental Hockey League for Avangard Omsk, HC Sibir Novosibirsk, Ak Bars Kazan, SKA Saint Petersburg, Metallurg Novokuznetsk, HC Spartak Moscow, HC Yugra and Avtomobilist Yekaterinburg. He also played in Asia League Ice Hockey for Sakhalin.

== Career statistics ==
=== Regular season and playoffs ===
			Regular season					Playoffs
Season	Team	League	GP	G	A	Pts	PIM	GP	G	A	Pts	PIM
1998–99	Avangard–VDV Omsk	RUS.3	6	2	4	6	4	—	—	—	—	—
1999–2000	Avangard–VDV Omsk	RUS.3	25	12	14	26	10	—	—	—	—	—
2000–01	Avangard–VDV Omsk	RUS.3	42	22	34	56	12	—	—	—	—	—
2001–02	Mostovik Kurgan	RUS.2	50	13	21	34	18	—	—	—	—	—
2002–03	Avangard Omsk	RSL	8	2	0	2	0	—	—	—	—	—
2002–03	Avangard–VDV Omsk	RUS.3	13	14	8	22	16	—	—	—	—	—
2002–03	Sibir Novosibirsk	RSL	20	4	3	7	4	—	—	—	—	—
2003–04	Avangard Omsk	RSL	27	2	2	4	4	—	—	—	—	—
2003–04	Omskie Yastreby	RUS.3	39	21	22	43	38	—	—	—	—	—
2004–05	Sibir Novosibirsk	RSL	46	4	5	9	2	—	—	—	—	—
2004–05	Sibir–2 Novosibirsk	RUS.3	3	1	3	4	0	—	—	—	—	—
2005–06	Sibir Novosibirsk	RSL	51	11	13	24	44	3	2	0	2	0
2006–07	Ak Bars Kazan	RSL	36	4	6	10	16	9	0	2	2	4
2007–08	Ak Bars Kazan	RSL	11	3	0	3	4	—	—	—	—	—
2007–08	Ak Bars–2 Kazan	RUS.3	12	7	9	16	8	—	—	—	—	—
2007–08	Avangard Omsk	RSL	23	4	5	9	20	4	0	2	2	6
2008–09	Avangard Omsk	KHL	3	0	0	0	0	—	—	—	—	—
2008–09	SKA St. Petersburg	KHL	28	2	3	5	8	—	—	—	—	—
2008–09	VMF St. Petersburg	RUS.2	1	0	1	1	0	—	—	—	—	—
2009–10	Metallurg Novokuznetsk	KHL	51	16	5	21	16	—	—	—	—	—
2010–11	Metallurg Novokuznetsk	KHL	50	7	19	26	28	—	—	—	—	—
2010–11	Spartak Moscow	KHL	4	0	1	1	0	4	0	0	0	0
2011–12	Metallurg Novokuznetsk	KHL	54	9	15	24	10	—	—	—	—	—
2012–13	HC Yugra	KHL	14	4	2	6	2	—	—	—	—	—
2012–13	Avtomobilist Yekaterinburg	KHL	6	0	0	0	0	—	—	—	—	—
2012–13	Saryarka Karagandy	VHL	9	2	1	3	0	2	0	1	1	0
2013–14	THK Tver	VHL	43	11	16	27	14	4	0	1	1	2
2014–15	THK Tver	VHL	9	1	2	3	2	—	—	—	—	—
2014–15	Sputnik Nizhny Tagil	VHL	30	10	9	19	4	7	1	1	2	2
2015–16	Sputnik Nizhny Tagil	VHL	16	2	2	4	2	—	—	—	—	—
2015–16	PSK Sakhalin	ALH	24	6	13	19	6	8	1	5	6	0
2016–17	PSK Sakhalin	ALH	32	7	28	35	8	7	1	1	2	0
2017–18	HC Csíkszereda	EL	12	7	2	9		—	—	—	—	—
2017–18	HC Csíkszereda	ROU	7	4	4	8	4	3	3	2	5	0
2018–19	Orlik Opole	POL	29	7	16	23	8	—	—	—	—	—
2018–19	Stoczniowiec Gdańsk	POL	11	7	5	12	8	9	4	4	8	6
2019–20	Stoczniowiec Gdańsk	POL	44	12	11	23	14	5	1	0	1	2
RUS.2 & VHL totals			158	39	52	91	40	13	1	3	4	4
RSL totals			222	34	34	68	94	16	2	4	6	10
KHL totals			210	38	45	83	64	4	0	0	0	0

=== International ===
Year	Team	Event	GP	G	A	Pts	PIM
2001	Russia	WJC18	6	2	3	5	0
Junior totals			6	2	3	5	0
