= Severstal Cherepovets =

Professional ice hockey club based in Cherepovets, Russia

- City: Cherepovets, Russia
- League: KHL 2008–present: RSL 1996–2008; IHL 1992–1996; Soviet League Class A2 1965–1966, 1981–1987, 1989–1992; Soviet League Class A3 1966–1981, 1987–1989; Soviet League Class B 1963–1965
- Conference: Western
- Division: Bobrov
- Founded: 1956
- Home arena: Ice Palace (since 2006) (capacity: 6,064)
- Colours
- Owner: Alexei Mordashov
- General manager: Nikolai Kanakov
- Head coach: Andrei Kozyrev
- Captain: Adam Liška
- Media: Kanal 12
- Affiliates: HC Tambov (VHL); Almaz Cherepovets (MHL); Metallurg-VO (NMHL)
- Website: severstalclub.ru
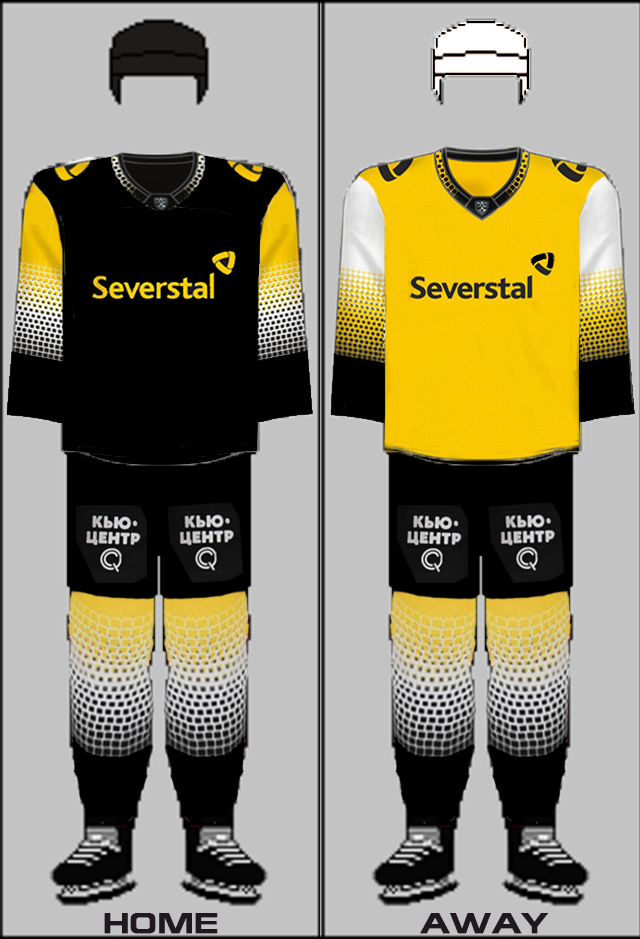

Franchise history
- 1956–1959: Stroitel Cherepovets
- 1959–1994: Metallurg Cherepovets
- 1994–present: Severstal Cherepovets

Hockey Club Severstal is a professional ice hockey club based in Cherepovets, Russia. It is a member of the Tarasov Division in the Kontinental Hockey League (KHL).

== History ==
Founded in 1956, the club was originally known as Stroitel (Builder) Cherepovets. The name was changed to Metallurg (Metallurgist) Cherepovets in 1959. During the Soviet times, Metallurg played in the low and mid-level divisions of the ice hockey championship. But since the 1990s, not without the financial support of its parent company Severstal (Northsteel), the club joined the ranks of the major professional teams starting with the first season of the then newly established International Hockey League. The club eventually changed its name after the owner in 1994. The biggest success of Severstal to date was in the 2002-2003 Superleague season when they advanced to the final with Lokomotiv Yaroslavl. The home arena is the Ice Palace where home matches are played since 2006/2007 Russian Superleague season. Earlier the Sports-Concert Hall Almaz was the home arena.

== Honors ==
=== Champions ===
(gold) Pajulahti Cup (2): 2000, 2006
(gold) Donbass Open Cup (1): 2012
(gold) Hockeyades de la Vallee de Joux (1): 2013

=== Runners-up ===
(silver) Russian Superleague (1): 2003
(bronze) Russian Superleague (1): 2001

== Season-by-season KHL record ==
Note: GP = Games played; W = Wins; L = Losses; T = Ties; Pts = Points; GF = Goals for; GA = Goals against; P = Playoff

Season	GP	W	L	OTL	Pts	GF	GA	Finish	Top Scorer	Playoffs
2008–09	56	19	25	2	77	142	171	4th, Bobrov	Yuri Trubachev (31 points:17 G, 14 A; 56 GP)	Did not qualify
2009–10	56	16	23	2	74	151	162	5th, Tarasov	Vadim Schipachev (44 points: 14 G, 30 A; 55 GP)	Did not qualify
2010–11	54	25	20	4	89	145	142	3rd, Tarasov	Josef Straka (40 points: 19 G, 21 A; 52 GP)	Lost in Conference Quarterfinals, 2-4 (Atlant Moscow Oblast)
2011–12	54	23	20	2	85	142	133	3rd, Tarasov	Vadim Schipachev (59 points: 22 G, 37 A; 54 GP)	Lost in Conference Quarterfinals, 2-4 (Atlant Moscow Oblast)
2012–13	52	21	16	5	85	137	117	3rd, Tarasov	Vadim Schipachev (41 points: 17 G, 24 A; 51 GP)	Lost in Conference Semifinals, 0-4 (SKA Saint Petersburg)
2013–14	54	25	22	7	77	128	135	5th, Tarasov	Linus Videll (27 points: 10 G, 17 A; 52 GP)	Did not qualify
2014–15	60	27	21	12	85	157	168	6th, Tarasov	Dmitri Kagarlitsky (44 points: 12 G, 32 A; 60 GP)	Did not qualify
2015–16	60	20	34	6	58	124	167	7th, Tarasov	Dmitri Kagarlitsky (37 points: 16 G, 21 A; 58 GP)	Did not qualify
2016–17	60	23	27	10	74	133	163	7th, Tarasov	Dmitri Kagarlitsky (48 points: 16 G, 32 A; 60 GP)	Did not qualify
2017–18	56	27	18	11	83	131	145	5th, Tarasov	Dmitri Kagarlitsky (45 points: 17 G, 28 A; 55 GP)	Lost in Conference Quarterfinals, 0-4 (SKA Saint Petersburg)
2018–19	62	23	34	5	51	124	178	6th, Bobrov	Yuri Trubachev (22 points: 10 G, 12 A; 56 GP)	Did not qualify
2019–20	62	24	28	10	58	126	171	5th, Bobrov	Igor Geraskin (23 points: 9 G, 14 A; 59 GP)	Did not qualify
2020–21	60	32	24	9	68	149	159	4th, Bobrov	Alexander Petunin (39 points: 18 G, 21 A; 59 GP)	Lost in Conference Quarterfinals, 1-4 (Dynamo Moscow)
2021–22	49	28	14	7	63	129	119	4th, Bobrov	Daniil Vovchenko (32 points: 14 G, 18 A; 48 GP)	Lost in Conference Quarterfinals, 3-4 (Dynamo Moscow)
2022–23	68	31	24	13	75	182	187	4th, Tarasov	Igor Geraskin (43 points: 14 G, 29 A; 66 GP)	Lost in Conference Quarterfinals, 3-4 (CSKA Moscow)
2023–24	68	36	24	8	80	203	185	3rd, Tarasov	Kirill Pilipenko (62 points: 32 G, 30 A; 62 GP)	Lost in Last 16, 1-4 (Spartak Moscow)
2024–25	68	41	26	1	75	200	198	5th, Tarasov	Danil Aimurzin (57 points: 31 G, 26 A; 66 GP)	Lost in Last 16, 1-4 (Spartak Moscow)
2025–26	68	40	22	6	86	197	185	3rd, Tarasov	Ruslan Abrosimov (48 points: 24 G, 24 A; 62 GP)	Lost in Last 16, 1-4 (Torpedo Nizhny Novgorod)

== Players ==
=== Current roster ===
Updated 25 September 2026.

No.	Nat	Player	Pos	S/G	Age	Acquired	Birthplace
17	(Russia)	Ruslan Abrosimov	C	L	25	2021	Yaroslavl, Russia
79	(Russia)	Nikita Artamonov	RW	L	20	2026	Nizhnekamsk, Russia
7	(Russia)	Nikolai Burenov	D	L	25	2023	Moscow, Russia
70	(Russia)	Ilya Chefanov	RW	L	24	2025	Yaroslavl, Russia
78	(Russia)	Semyon Chuklinov	D	L	18	2026	Ust-Kamenogorsk, Kazakhstan
54	(Russia)	Andrei Churkin	D	R	30	2026	St. Petersburg, Russia
75	(Russia)	Timofei Davydov	D	L	24	2023	Omsk, Russia
88	(Russia)	David Dumbadze (A)	RW	L	31	2020	Penza, Russia
77	(Russia)	Makar Fomin	D	L	19	2024	Vologda, Russia
70	(Russia)	Yegor Graf	C	L	20	2026	Barnaul, Russia
32	(Canada)	Thomas Grégoire	D	R	28	2025	Sherbrooke, Quebec, Canada
2	(Russia)	Vladimir Grudinin (A)	D	L	22	2023	Angarsk, Russia
6	(Russia)	Ilya Ivantsov	F	L	23	2022	Penza, Russia
8	(Canada)	Yanni Kaldis	D	L	31	2024	Saint-Laurent, Quebec, Canada
81	(Russia)	Daniil Kazulayev	RW	L	20	2025	Moscow, Russia
97	(Russia)	Semyon Kizimov	RW	L	26	2026	Togliatti, Russia
55	(Russia)	Alexei Kozhevnikov	D	L	24	2026	Chita, Russia
51	(Russia)	Ilya Kvochko	C	L	22	2023	Magnitogorsk, Russia
23	(Slovakia)	Adam Liška (C)	LW	L	26	2019	Bratislava, Slovakia
16	(Russia)	Vsevolod Nikitin	LW	R	23	2026	Inta, Russia
66	(Russia)	Ivan Podshivalov	F	L	24	2021	Saint Petersburg, Russia
71	(Russia)	Nikita Popugayev	LW	R	27	2026	Moscow, Russia
37	(Russia)	Ilya Reingardt	RW	L	23	2025	Pavlodar, Russia
21	(Russia)	Ivan Remezovsky	D	L	21	2026	Moscow, Russia
29	(Russia)	Alexander Samoilov	G	L	29	2023	Moscow, Russia
12	(Belarus)	Alexander Skorenov	F	R	26	2023	Gomel, Belarus
30	(Russia)	Vsevolod Skotnikov	G	L	25	2025	Kazan, Russia
42	(Russia)	Kirill Tankov	C	L	24	2025	Khanty-Mansiysk, Russia
18	(Russia)	Danil Veryayev	RW	L	28	2025	Nizhny Novgorod, Russia
11	(United States)	Denis Yan	LW	L	29	2026	Portland, Oregon, United States
73	(Russia)	Artyom Zhukov	D	R	24	2025	St. Petersburg, Russia

=== All-time KHL scoring leaders ===
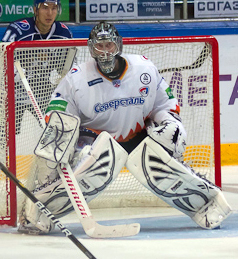
Vadim Tarasov in 2011

These are the top-ten point-scorers in franchise history. Figures are updated after each completed KHL regular season.

Note: Pos = Position; GP = Games played; G = Goals; A = Assists; Pts = Points; P/G = Points per game; = current player

Points
Player	Pos	GP	G	A	Pts	P/G
(Russia) Daniil Vovchenko	RW	410	93	114	207	0.51
(Russia) Vadim Shipachyov	C	240	70	120	190	0.79
(Russia) Kirill Pilipenko	LW	235	93	86	179	0.76
(Russia) Dmitri Kagarlitsky	RW	233	61	113	174	0.75
(Russia) Yuri Trubachev	RW	424	64	110	174	0.41
(Slovakia) Adam Liška	LW	381	73	89	162	0.42
(Russia) Danil Aimurzin	C	193	61	87	148	0.76
(Russia) Ruslan Abrosimov	C	269	62	78	140	0.52
(Russia) Igor Geraskin	LW	311	48	90	138	0.44
(Czech Republic) Josef Straka	C	191	63	65	128	0.67

Goals
Player	Pos	G
(Russia) Daniil Vovchenko	RW	93
(Russia) Kirill Pilipenko	LW	93
(Slovakia) Adam Liška	LW	73
(Russia) Vadim Shipachyov	C	70
(Russia) Yuri Trubachev	RW	64
(Czech Republic) Josef Straka	C	63
(Russia) Ruslan Abrosimov	C	62
(Russia) Dmitri Kagarlitsky	RW	61
(Russia) Danil Aimurzin	C	61
(Russia) Pavel Chernov	C	52

Assists
Player	Pos	A
(Russia) Vadim Shipachyov	C	120
(Russia) Daniil Vovchenko	RW	114
(Russia) Dmitri Kagarlitsky	RW	113
(Russia) Yuri Trubachev	RW	110
(Russia) Igor Geraskin	LW	90
(Slovakia) Adam Liška	LW	89
(Russia) Danil Aimurzin	C	87
(Russia) Kirill Pilipenko	LW	86
(Russia) Ruslan Abrosimov	C	78
(Russia) Mikhail Ilyin	LW	72
