= Andrej Kollár (ice hockey, born 1999) =

Slovak ice hockey defenceman

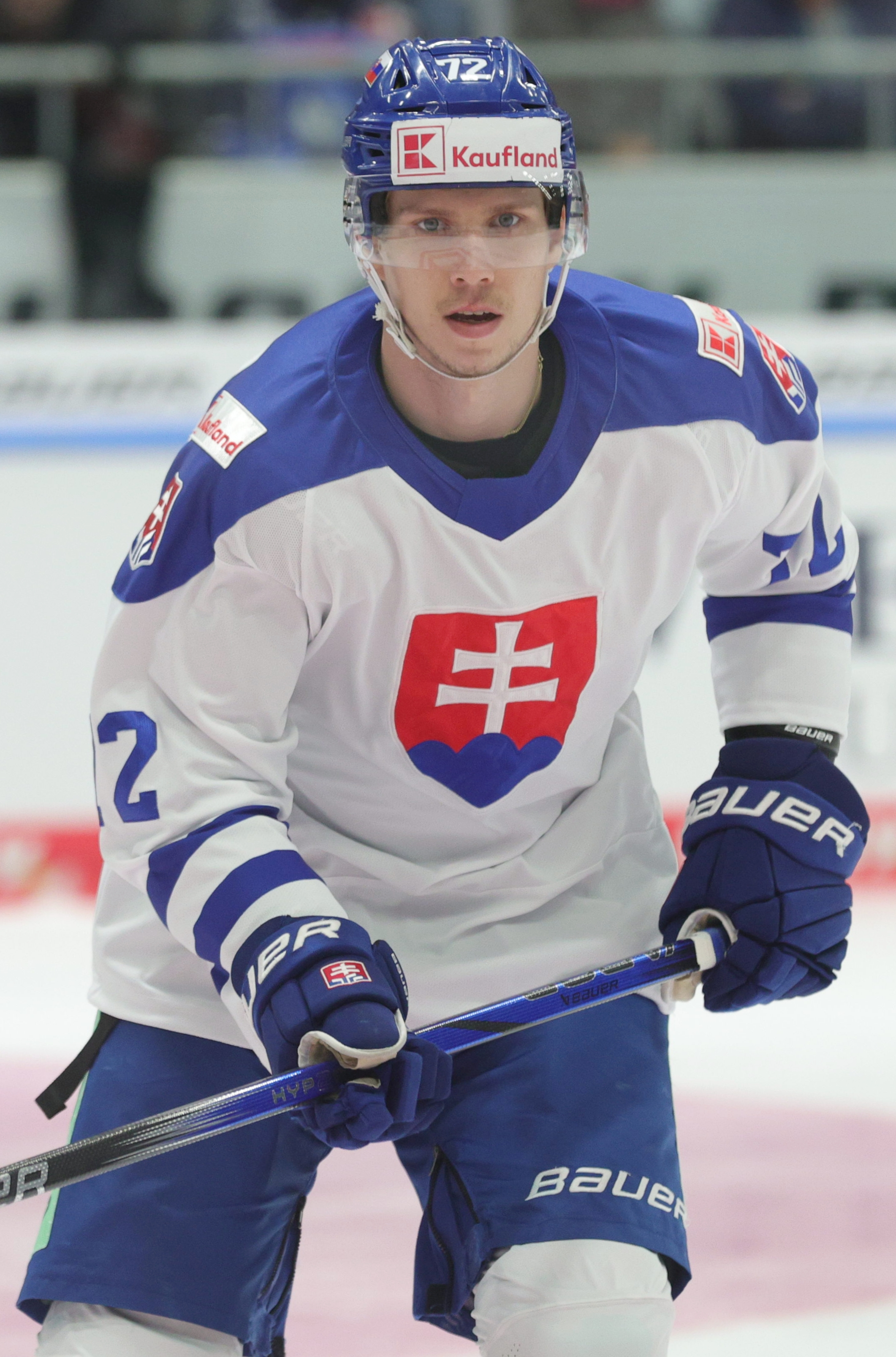
- Andrej Kollár, 2024
- Born: 4 November 1999 (age 26) Nitra, Slovakia
- Height: 6 ft 2 in (188 cm)
- Weight: 190 lb (86 kg; 13 st 8 lb)
- Position: Forward
- Shoots: Right
- Czech team Former teams: HC Kometa Brno; HK Dukla Trenčín; HK Nitra; HK Orange 20; Muskegon Lumberjacks
- National team: Slovakia
- Playing career: 2017–present

Andrej Kollár (born 4 November 1999) is a Slovak professional ice hockey player who is a forward for HC Kometa Brno of the Czech Extraliga (ELH).

== Career ==
Kollár began his career with HK Dukla Trenčín, playing in their various Jr. teams in 2015. Later he played in Jr. teams for HK Nitra between 2016 and 2018. After that he played for their senior team.

Kollár previously played for HK Dukla Trenčín, HK Orange 20, HK Nitra and Muskegon Lumberjacks of the United States Hockey League.

== Career statistics ==
=== Regular season and playoffs ===
			Regular season					Playoffs
Season	Team	League	GP	G	A	Pts	PIM	GP	G	A	Pts	PIM

=== International ===
Year	Team	Event	Result	GP	G	A	Pts	PIM
2019	Slovakia	WJC	8th	5	3	0	3	0
2022	Slovakia	WC	8th	4	1	0	1	0
2026	Slovakia	WC	9th	7	0	0	0	0
Junior totals				5	3	0	3	0
Senior totals				11	1	0	1	0
