= Andrei Yermakov =

Russian ice hockey player

- Born: March 12, 1994 (age 31) Moscow, Russia
- Height: 6 ft 2 in (188 cm)
- Weight: 218 lb (99 kg; 15 st 8 lb)
- Position: Defence
- Shoots: Right
- VHL team Former teams: Yuzhny Ural Orsk; Spartak Moscow; SKA Saint Petersburg; CSKA Moscow; Torpedo Nizhny Novgorod; Sibir Novosibirsk; Admiral Vladivostok
- Playing career: 2013–present

Andrei Grigorevich Yermakov (Ермаков, Андрей Григорьевич; born March 12, 1994) is a Russian professional ice hockey defenceman. He is currently playing with Yuzhny Ural Orsk of the Supreme Hockey League (VHL).

Yermakov made his Kontinental Hockey League (KHL) debut playing with HC Spartak Moscow during the 2013–14 KHL season.

== Awards and honors ==
Award	Year
KHL
Gagarin Cup (SKA Saint Petersburg)	2015
