= Metallurg Novokuznetsk =

Ice hockey team from Kemerovo Oblast, Russia

- City: Novokuznetsk, Kemerovo Oblast
- League: VHL; 2017–present: KHL 2008–2017; RSL 1996–2008; IHL 1992–1996; Soviet League Class A2 1965–1966, 1968–1970, 1971–1975, 1984–1992; Soviet League Class A3 1970–1971, 1975–1984; Soviet League Class A 1960–1965, 1966–1968; Soviet League Class B 1955–1960
- Conference: 2
- Division: D
- Founded: 1949
- Home arena: Kuznetsk Metallurgists Sports Palace (capacity: 7,533)
- Colours
- Owner: Evraz
- General manager: Iliya Musin
- Head coach: Andrei Lunyov
- Captain: Daniil Apalkov
- Affiliates: Kuznetskie Medvedi (MHL)
- Website: www.metallurg-nk.ru

Franchise history
- Metallurg Novokuznetsk

Metallurg Novokuznetsk (Russian: Металлург Новокузнецк Shor: Металлург Аба-тура) is a professional ice hockey team from Siberia based in Novokuznetsk, Kemerovo Oblast, Russia. They are currently members of the Supreme Hockey League (VHL).

== History ==
The team was founded in 1949 in Novokuznetsk (then Stalinsk) to compete in the lower divisions of the Soviet ice hockey championship. During the 1960s, Metallurg managed to advance to the elite group for several seasons, but did not establish itself as a major club until the 1990s when the International Hockey League was formed.

During the first years of the post-Soviet era, Novokuznetsk significantly improved its roster with players from the Ust-Kamenogorsk school.

The team's downfall began in 2004 when its managerial staff moved to SKA Saint Petersburg signing the best players from Novokuznetsk. Despite that the team was able to rebuild itself and years later joined the Kontinental Hockey League in 2008.

Following the 2016–17 season, with the KHL in need to regulate debts amongst clubs through contraction and with Novokuznetsk in financial trouble pertaining to a lack of success on the ice, they were excluded from participating in the KHL on May 24, 2017. Novokuznetsk will continue to operate their junior club program and also participate in the secondary tier of the VHL.

On 21 May 2020, Metallurg ended their affiliation with HC Sibir Novosibirsk, opting to be the farm team for Avangard Omsk of the KHL for the 2020–21 season.

== Honors ==
=== Winners ===
(gold) President of the Republic of Kazakhstan's Cup (1): 2016

=== Runners-up ===
(bronze) Russian Superleague Championship (1): 2000

== Season-by-season KHL record ==
Note: GP = Games played, W = Wins, L = Losses, T = Ties, OTL = Overtime/shootout losses, Pts = Points, GF = Goals for, GA = Goals against

Season	GP	W	OTW	SOW	SOL	OTL	L	Pts	GF	GA	Finish	Playoffs
2008–09	56	12	3	2	5	3	31	54	127	157	5th, Bobrov	Did not qualify
2009–10	56	13	1	2	2	5	33	52	105	159	6th, Chernyshev	Did not qualify
2010–11	54	8	1	3	4	5	33	41	105	186	6th, Chernyshev	Did not qualify
2011–12	54	18	2	4	9	0	21	75	108	130	5th, Chernyshev	Did not qualify
2012–13	52	15	3	1	3	2	28	58	132	177	5th, Chernyshev	Did not qualify
2013–14	54	12	1	1	4	6	30	50	115	170	6th, Chernyshev	Did not qualify
2014–15	60	10	3	7	1	2	37	53	115	190	6th, Chernyshev	Did not qualify
2015–16	60	13	1	0	10	4	32	55	128	191	7th, Chernyshev	Did not qualify
2016–17	60	8	1	5	2	2	42	40	97	194	8th, Chernyshev	Did not qualify

== Franchise records and leaders ==
=== KHL scoring leaders ===
These were the top-ten KHL point-scorers in franchise history.

Note: Pos = Position; GP = Games played; G = Goals; A = Assists; Pts = Points; P/G = Points per game

Points
Player	Pos	GP	G	A	Pts	P/G
(Russia) Alexander Golovin	LW	155	32	39	71	.46
(Russia) Alexander Bumagin	LW	129	26	37	63	.49
(Russia) Dmitri Kagarlitsky	LW	94	20	39	59	.63
(Canada) Randy Robitaille	C	91	22	35	57	.63
(Russia) Alexander Komaristy	C	167	25	31	56	.33
(Russia) Alexei Kosourov	F	178	28	26	54	.30
(United States) Ryan Stoa	LW	93	30	23	53	.57
(Kazakhstan) Fedor Polishchuk	LW	159	17	35	52	.33
(Kazakhstan) Dmitri Dudarev	RW	163	25	25	50	.31
(Russia) Ansel Galimov	RW	105	22	19	41	.39

Goals
Player	Pos	G
(Russia) Alexander Golovin	LW	32
(United States) Ryan Stoa	LW	30
(Russia) Alexei Kosourov	F	28
(Russia) Alexander Bumagin	LW	26
(Russia) Alexander Komaristy	C	25
(Kazakhstan) Dmitri Dudarev	RW	25
(Russia) Ansel Galimov	RW	22
(Canada) Randy Robitaille	C	22
(Russia) Dmitri Kagarlitsky	LW	20
(Russia) Nikita Vyglazov	RW	18

Assists
Player	Pos	A
(Russia) Alexander Golovin	LW	39
(Russia) Dmitri Kagarlitsky	LW	39
(Russia) Alexander Bumagin	LW	37
(Kazakhstan) Fedor Polishchuk	LW	35
(Canada) Randy Robitaille	C	35
(Russia) Mikhail Kuklev	D	31
(Russia) Alexander Komaristy	C	31
(United States) Cade Fairchild	D	28
(Russia) Alexei Kosourov	F	26
(Kazakhstan) Dmitri Dudarev	RW	25
