= 2018 IIHF Challenge Cup of Asia – Division I =

2018 IIHF Challenge Cup of Asia Division I

Tournament details
- Host country: Malaysia
- Venue(s): 1 (in 1 host city)
- Dates: 24–29 March 2018
- Teams: 4

Final positions
- Champions: Malaysia (1st title)
- Runner-up: Macau
- Third place: Indonesia

Tournament statistics
- Games played: 10
- Goals scored: 83 (8.3 per game)
- Attendance: 2,949 (295 per game)
- Scoring leader(s): (Malaysia) Ban Kin Loke & (Malaysia) Bryan Lim (19 points)

Official website
- IIHF.com

The 2018 IIHF Challenge Cup of Asia Division I was the 5th IIHF Challenge Cup of Asia Division I competition, an annual international ice hockey tournament held by the International Ice Hockey Federation (IIHF). The Division I competition took place from 24 to 29 March 2018 at the Malaysia National Ice Skating Stadium in Kuala Lumpur, Malaysia. Four teams competed in the tournament. Originally, six teams were scheduled to compete. However, Oman and Qatar were scheduled to compete, but cancelled. Indonesia made its debut in the Challenge Cup of Asia. The host nation Malaysia won its first Division I tournament, winning all five of its games, defeating Macau in the final and promoted to Top Division for the 2019 IIHF Challenge Cup of Asia.

== Participants ==
Team	2017 Results
Malaysia	Host, finished 5th place in Top Division last year and were relegated.
India	Runner-up of Division I last year.
Macau	Finished 4th place in Division I last year.
Indonesia	No previous participation.

=== Match officials ===
4 referees and 6 linesmen were selected for the tournament.

Referees

- (Singapore) Yu Jin Ang
- (China) Feng Lei
- (Philippines) Francois Emmanuel Gautier
- (New Zealand) Ryan Hissong

Linesmen

- (Indonesia) Raedeni Atmaja
- (Kazakhstan) Anton Boryayev
- (Malaysia) Yong Elbert Cheah
- (Singapore) Qiwei Benjamin Huang
- (Macau) Tam Weng Leong
- (Hong Kong) Chun Wong

== Standings ==
Pos	Team	Pld	W	OTW	OTL	L	GF	GA	GD	Pts
1	Malaysia (H)	3	3	0	0	0	29	2	+27	9
2	India	3	1	0	0	2	6	14	−8	3 (Note: India 3 Pts, +1 GD; Macau 3 Pts, 0 GD; Indonesia 3 Pts, –1 GD)
3	Macau	3	1	0	0	2	6	12	−6	3
4	Indonesia	3	1	0	0	2	6	19	−13	3

Source: IIHF
Rules for classification: 1) points; 2) head-to-head points; 3) head-to-head goal difference; 4) head-to-head number of goals scored; 5) result against closest best-ranked team outside tied teams; 6) result against second-best ranked team outside tied teams; 7) seeding before tournament.
(H) Host

== Schedules ==
All times are in Malaysia Standard Time (UTC+8).

=== Preliminary round ===
24 March 2018; 14:30	India	3–0 (0–0, 0–0, 3–0)	Macau	MyNISS, Kuala Lumpur; Attendance: 128

Game reference
			Referee: (Singapore) Yu Jin Ang; Linesmen: (Indonesia) Raedeni Atmaja (Kazakhstan) Anton Boryayev
8 min	Penalties	14 min	Referee: (Singapore) Yu Jin Ang; Linesmen: (Indonesia) Raedeni Atmaja (Kazakhstan) Anton Boryayev
18	Shots	27	Referee: (Singapore) Yu Jin Ang; Linesmen: (Indonesia) Raedeni Atmaja (Kazakhstan) Anton Boryayev

24 March 2018; 18:15	Malaysia	12–0 (3–0, 4–0, 5–0)	Indonesia	MyNISS, Kuala Lumpur; Attendance: 562

Game reference
			Referee: (China) Feng Lei; Linesmen: (Singapore) Qiwei Benjamin Huang (Macau) Tam Weng Leong
0 min	Penalties	22 min	Referee: (China) Feng Lei; Linesmen: (Singapore) Qiwei Benjamin Huang (Macau) Tam Weng Leong
38	Shots	10	Referee: (China) Feng Lei; Linesmen: (Singapore) Qiwei Benjamin Huang (Macau) Tam Weng Leong

25 March 2018; 14:30	India	2–4 (1–3, 0–1, 1–0)	Indonesia	MyNISS, Kuala Lumpur; Attendance: 166

Game reference
			Referee: (Philippines) Francois Emmanuel Gautier; Linesmen: (Malaysia) Yong Elbert Cheah (Hong Kong) Chun Wong
20 min	Penalties	22 min	Referee: (Philippines) Francois Emmanuel Gautier; Linesmen: (Malaysia) Yong Elbert Cheah (Hong Kong) Chun Wong
23	Shots	25	Referee: (Philippines) Francois Emmanuel Gautier; Linesmen: (Malaysia) Yong Elbert Cheah (Hong Kong) Chun Wong

25 March 2018; 18:00	Macau	1–7 (0–1, 1–4, 0–2)	Malaysia	MyNISS, Kuala Lumpur; Attendance: 374

Game reference
			Referee: (New Zealand) Ryan Hissong; Linesmen: (Kazakhstan) Anton Boryayev (Singapore) Qiwei Benjamin Huang
8 min	Penalties	4 min	Referee: (New Zealand) Ryan Hissong; Linesmen: (Kazakhstan) Anton Boryayev (Singapore) Qiwei Benjamin Huang
24	Shots	51	Referee: (New Zealand) Ryan Hissong; Linesmen: (Kazakhstan) Anton Boryayev (Singapore) Qiwei Benjamin Huang

27 March 2018; 14:30	Indonesia	2–5 (1–1, 1–2, 0–2)	Macau	MyNISS, Kuala Lumpur; Attendance: 116

Game reference
			Referee: (China) Feng Lei; Linesmen: (Malaysia) Yong Elbert Cheah (Hong Kong) Chun Wong
20 min	Penalties	56 min	Referee: (China) Feng Lei; Linesmen: (Malaysia) Yong Elbert Cheah (Hong Kong) Chun Wong
24	Shots	37	Referee: (China) Feng Lei; Linesmen: (Malaysia) Yong Elbert Cheah (Hong Kong) Chun Wong

27 March 2018; 18:00	Malaysia	10–1 (3–0, 4–0, 3–1)	India	MyNISS, Kuala Lumpur; Attendance: 445

Game reference
			Referee: (Singapore) Yu Jin Ang; Linesmen: (Indonesia) Raedeni Atmaja (Macau) Tam Weng Leong
6 min	Penalties	28 min	Referee: (Singapore) Yu Jin Ang; Linesmen: (Indonesia) Raedeni Atmaja (Macau) Tam Weng Leong
43	Shots	20	Referee: (Singapore) Yu Jin Ang; Linesmen: (Indonesia) Raedeni Atmaja (Macau) Tam Weng Leong

=== Bracket ===
Semifinals
A1	Malaysia	12
A4	Indonesia	4
A2	India	2
A3	Macau	4

Final
WSF1	Malaysia	7
WSF2	Macau	2
Third place game
LSF1	India	1
LSF2	Indonesia	4

=== Semifinals ===
28 March 2018; 14:30	India	2–4 (0–2, 0–0, 2–2)	Macau	MyNISS, Kuala Lumpur; Attendance: 179

Game reference
			Referee: (New Zealand) Ryan Hissong; Linesmen: (Indonesia) Raedeni Atmaja (Kazakhstan) Anton Boryayev
45 min	Penalties	6 min	Referee: (New Zealand) Ryan Hissong; Linesmen: (Indonesia) Raedeni Atmaja (Kazakhstan) Anton Boryayev
24	Shots	33	Referee: (New Zealand) Ryan Hissong; Linesmen: (Indonesia) Raedeni Atmaja (Kazakhstan) Anton Boryayev

28 March 2018; 18:00	Malaysia	12–4 (4–0, 5–2, 3–2)	Indonesia	MyNISS, Kuala Lumpur; Attendance: 316

Game reference
			Referee: (Philippines) Francois Emmanuel Gautier; Linesmen: (Macau) Tam Weng Leong (Hong Kong) Chun Wong
6 min	Penalties	18 min	Referee: (Philippines) Francois Emmanuel Gautier; Linesmen: (Macau) Tam Weng Leong (Hong Kong) Chun Wong
42	Shots	15	Referee: (Philippines) Francois Emmanuel Gautier; Linesmen: (Macau) Tam Weng Leong (Hong Kong) Chun Wong

=== Third place game ===
29 March 2018; 14:30	India	1–4 (0–2, 1–1, 0–1)	Indonesia	MyNISS, Kuala Lumpur; Attendance: 208

Game reference
			Referee: (Singapore) Yu Jin Ang; Linesmen: (Malaysia) Yong Elbert Cheah (Singapore) Qiwei Benjamin Huang
12 min	Penalties	8 min	Referee: (Singapore) Yu Jin Ang; Linesmen: (Malaysia) Yong Elbert Cheah (Singapore) Qiwei Benjamin Huang
36	Shots	27	Referee: (Singapore) Yu Jin Ang; Linesmen: (Malaysia) Yong Elbert Cheah (Singapore) Qiwei Benjamin Huang

=== Final ===
29 March 2018; 18:00	Malaysia	7–2 (4–0, 2–0, 1–2)	Macau	MyNISS, Kuala Lumpur; Attendance: 455

Game reference
			Referee: (New Zealand) Ryan Hissong; Linesmen: (Kazakhstan) Anton Boryayev (Hong Kong) Chun Wong
22 min	Penalties	10 min	Referee: (New Zealand) Ryan Hissong; Linesmen: (Kazakhstan) Anton Boryayev (Hong Kong) Chun Wong
32	Shots	20	Referee: (New Zealand) Ryan Hissong; Linesmen: (Kazakhstan) Anton Boryayev (Hong Kong) Chun Wong

== Final ranking ==
Promoted to 2019 IIHF Challenge Cup of Asia

Rank	Team
1	Malaysia (H, P)
2	Macau
3	Indonesia
4	India

(H) Host; (P) Promoted.
Source: IIHF
