= 2012 IIHF Challenge Cup of Asia =

Annual international ice hockey tournament

Tournament details
- Host country: India
- Dates: 17–25 March 2012
- Teams: 7

Final positions
- Champions: United Arab Emirates (2nd title)
- Runners-up: Thailand
- Third place: Malaysia

Tournament statistics
- Games played: 18
- Goals scored: 159 (8.83 per game)
- Attendance: 4,627 (257 per game)

The 2012 IIHF Challenge Cup of Asia was the fifth IIHF Challenge Cup of Asia, an annual international ice hockey tournament held by the International Ice Hockey Federation (IIHF). It took place from 17 to 25 March 2012 in Dehradun, India. The defending champions Hong Kong, who claimed their first title in 2011, did not send a team to this year's edition. Chinese Taipei, winners of the 2010 tournament, competed after skipping the 2011 tournament. The United Arab Emirates won the tournament after defeating Thailand in the final, and Malaysia finished third after defeating Kuwait in the bronze medal match.

== Overview ==
This will be the first IIHF-sanctioned tournament in India and will be expanded to seven teams. The teams will be split into two seeded groups. Group A will include the United Arab Emirates, Thailand, Chinese Taipei, and Kuwait and play in a round-robin format. Group B will consist of Macau, Malaysia, and India, playing in a double-round robin format. The top two teams in Group A will receive a bye to the semi-finals, while the bottom two will play a semi-final qualification against the top two teams from Group B.

The United Arab Emirates won the tournament after defeating Thailand 3 – 0 in the final. It was the United Arab Emirates' second title, having previously won the 2009 IIHF Challenge Cup of Asia. Malaysia finished third after they defeated Kuwait in the bronze medal game. Loke Ban Kin finished the tournament as the top scorer after finishing with 27 points, including 16 goals and 11 assists. The United Arab Emirate's Khaled al-Suwaidi finished as the tournament's top goaltender based on save percentage with a percentage of 100.

== Group stage ==
=== Group A ===
Pos	Team	Pld	W	OTW	OTL	L	GF	GA	GD	Pts	Qualification
1	United Arab Emirates	3	3	0	0	0	24	3	+21	9	Semi-finals
2	Thailand	3	2	0	0	1	25	6	+19	6	Semi-finals
3	Kuwait	3	1	0	0	2	14	16	−2	3	Qualification play-off
4	Chinese Taipei	3	0	0	0	3	2	40	−38	0	Qualification play-off

Source: IIHF

All times local. (IST = UTC+5:30)

18 March 2012; 17:00	United Arab Emirates	4 – 3 (1–2, 1–0, 2–1)	Thailand	Dehradun Arena; Attendance: 200

Game reference

Ahmed al-Dhaheri
Goalies
Pattarapol Ungkulpattanasuk
Referee:
(South Korea) Baek Min-hwan
Linesmen:
(South Korea) Chae Young-jin
(South Korea) Hong Hyun-kook

	0 – 1	10:09 – C. Supadilokluk (L. Neimwan) (PP)
O. al-Shamisi (M. Eljachi, J. al-Dhaheri) (PP) – 15:33	1 – 1
	1 – 2	19:34 – P. Jirachai (V. Maklamthong)
S. al-Mehairi – 34:33	2 – 2
S. al-Mehairi (A. al-Dhaheri) – 41:52	3 – 2
	3 – 3	42:08 – T. Chartsuwan (C. Supadilokluk)
M. al-Mazrouei (S. al-Mehairi) – 45:14	4 – 3

12 min
Penalties
12 min
27
Shots
27

19 March 2012; 17:00	Chinese Taipei	2 – 12 (2–5, 0–4, 0–3)	Kuwait	Dehradun Arena; Attendance: 157

Game reference

Yang Ning-ya
Goalies
Jasem al-Sarraf (out 46:36)
Shuaib Shuaib (in 46:36)
Referee:
(Japan) Ichikawa Shunsuke
Linesmen:
(United Arab Emirates) Henri Neva
(Malaysia) Dion Robben

	0 – 1	04:46 – M. al-Shatti (Mo. al-Ajmi)
	0 – 2	09:45 – S. al-Ajmi (A. Shetail)
Chao T. (Yang N-Yu) – 13:38	1 – 2
	1 – 3	14:40 – Me. al-Ajmi (PP)
Liu Y. – 14:58	2 – 3
	2 – 4	15:47 – Mo. al-Ajmi (A. Shetail, A. al-Ajmi)
	2 – 5	19:32 – A. Shetail (A. al-Ajmi) (SH)
	2 – 6	21:24 – Me. al-Ajmi
	2 – 7	22:56 – A. Shetail (S. al-Ajmi)
	2 – 8	30:25 – A. al-Ajmi (A. Shetail) (PP2)
	2 – 9	30:35 – A. al-Ajmi (PP)
	2 – 10	48:37 – S. al-Ajmi (A. Shetail)
	2 – 11	51:07 – Me. al-Ajmi
	2 – 12	59:14 – F. Atallah (H. al-Shayji)

12 min
Penalties
14 min
20
Shots
45

20 March 2012; 14:00	Kuwait	0 – 6 (0–4, 0–0, 0–2)	United Arab Emirates	Deharadun Arena; Attendance: 173

Game reference

Jasem al-Sarraf
Goalies
Khaled al-Suwaidi
Referee:
(South Korea) Baek Min-hwan
Linesmen:
(China) Qiang Du
(Malaysia) Dion Robben

0 – 1	07:59 – S. al-Nuaimi (M. al-Mazrouei, S. al-Mehairi)
0 – 2	13:09 – S. al-Nuaimi (S. al-Mehairi, M. al-Shamisi) (PP)
0 – 3	16:14 – S. al-Nuaimi (S. al-Mehairi)
0 – 4	17:11 – A. al-Sarour (J. al-Dhaheri, O. al-Shamisi)
0 – 5	43:08 – J. al-Dhaheri (SH)
0 – 6	49:37 – S. al-Mehairi

16 min
Penalties
10 min
11
Shots
37

20 March 2012; 21:00	Thailand	14 – 0 (2–0, 6–0, 6–0)	Chinese Taipei	Dehradun Arena; Attendance: 153

Game reference

Prawes Kaewjeen
Goalies
Yang Ning-Ya
Referee:
(Malaysia) Yong Chun Lim
Linesmen:
(South Korea) Hong Hyun Kook
(China) Jian Cao

8:51 - Krongsakunsuk	1 – 0
10:02 - Chartsuwan (Rattanachot)	2 – 0
22:15 - Kullugin (Thamwongsin	3 – 0
23:17 - Suphankomut (Rattanachot)	4 – 0
23:34 - Chartsuwan	5 – 0
26:51 - Chartsuwan (Supadilokluk)	6 – 0
28:06 - Jirachai (Thamwongsin)	7 – 0
31:09 - Supadilokluk (Rattanachot)	8 – 0
45:01 - Rattanachot (Chartsuwan)	9 – 0
46:09 - Chartsuwan	10 – 0
49:02 - Chartsuwan (Supadilokluk)	11 – 0
49:40 - Rattanachot (Likit Neimwan)	12 – 0
54:04 - Rattanachot (Neimwan)	13 – 0
59:28 - Thamwongsin	14 – 0

2 min
Penalties
8 min
76
Shots
12

22 March 2012; 14:00	Thailand	8 – 2 (2–1, 4–0, 2–1)	Kuwait	Dehradun Arena; Attendance: 227

Game reference

Prawes Kaewjeen
Goalies
Jasem al-Sarraf
Referee:
(South Korea) Baek Min Hwan
Linesmen:
(South Korea) Hong Hyun Kook
(China) Jian Cao

5:33 - Rattanachot (Chartsuwan)	1 – 0
	1 – 1	15:49 - Me. al-Ajmi (Mo. al-Ajmi)
17:12 - Jirachai	2 – 1
25:13 - Chartsuwan (Suphankomut, Neimwan) (PP)	3 – 1
28:06 - Kullugin	4 – 1
30:44 - Supadilokluk (Chartsuwan)	5 – 1
32:57 - Tengsakul (Jirachai)	6 – 1
	6 – 2	43:18 - Mo. Al-Ajmi (PP)
46:54 - Rattanachot (Chartsuwan) (SH)	7 – 2
54:50 - Chartsuwan (Rattanachot)	8 – 2

8 min
Penalties
20 min
43
Shots
26

22 March 2012; 17:30	United Arab Emirates	14 – 0 (2–0, 6–0, 6–0)	Chinese Taipei	Dehradun Arena; Attendance: 184

Game reference

Khaled al-Suwaidi
Goalies
Yang Ning-Ya
Referee:
(Malaysia) Yong Chun Lim
Linesmen:
(South Korea) Chae Young Jin
(Malaysia) Dion Robben

11:00 - al-Dhaheri (al-Sarour)	1 – 0
12:20 - al-Nuaimi (al-Mehairi)	2 – 0
29:49 - al-Muharrami (al-Zaabi)	3 – 0
31:43 - al-Haddad (al-Dhareri)	4 – 0
32:34 - Al-Dhaheri (Budebs) (PP)	5 – 0
35:23 - al-Muharrami (al-Zaabi)	6 – 0
37:57 - al-Zaabi (al-Suwaidi)	7 – 0
39:24 - al-Shamisi (al-Dhaheri)	8 – 0
41:43 - Budebs (al-Mehairi)	9 – 0
43:34 - al-Jneibi (al-Suwaidi)	10 – 0
43:43 - al-Zaabi (al-Muharrami)	11 – 0
48:25 - al-Sarour (PP)	12 – 0
48:54 - al-Dhaheri (al-Sarour)	13 – 0
54:59 - el-Jachi (al-Haddad, al-Shamisi) (SH)	14 – 0

16 min
Penalties
10 min
55
Shots
9

=== Group B ===
Pos	Team	Pld	W	OTW	OTL	L	GF	GA	GD	Pts	Qualification
1	Malaysia	4	4	0	0	0	44	7	+37	12	Qualification play-off
2	India	4	1	0	0	3	12	37	−25	3	Qualification play-off
3	Macau	4	1	0	0	3	9	21	−12	3	Did not advance

Source: IIHF

All times local. (IST = UTC+5:30)

18 March 2012; 20:00	India	3 – 5 (1–0, 2–2, 0–3)	Macau	Dehradun Arena; Attendance: 247

Game reference

Sonam Gurmet
Goalies
Lou Kuan-leong
Referee:
(Chinese Taipei) Chiang Chih-yuan
Linesmen:
(China) Jian Cao
(China) Liu Jiaqi

M. Giri – 15:44	1 – 0
M. Iqbal – 29:05	2 – 0
	2 – 1	38:09 – U C. (PP)
	2 – 2	38:21 – Leong C. (Mok K.)
A. Ali (L. Tsewang) – 39:15	3 – 2
	3 – 3	45:39 – Choy P.
	3 – 4	50:06 – Leong C. (Wong K.)
	3 – 5	52:11 – Leong C.

8 min
Penalties
6 min
24
Shots
18

19 March 2012; 20:00	Macau	1 – 8 (0–1, 1–5, 0–2)	Malaysia	Dehradun Arena; Attendance: 132

Game reference

Lou Kuan-leong
Goalies
Vincent Shiao (out 30:58)
Tengku Abdillah (in 30:58)
Referee:
(Thailand) Sakchai Chinanuvatana
Linesmen:
(South Korea) Chae Young-jin
(China) Qiang Du

	0 – 1	05:34 – Loke B.
	0 – 2	20:57 – Loke B. (R. Isa)
	0 – 3	26:33 – A. Chang (B. Tan, Tan Ka.)
Leong C. (U C., Mok K.) – 28:34	1 – 3
	1 – 4	35:46 – E. Ng (Tan Kh.)
	1 – 5	37:28 – Teh T. (J. Chee (SH)
	1 – 6	39:15 – Loke B.
	1 – 7	41:08 – Moi J. (Loke B.) (PP)
	1 – 8	48:14 – J. Chee

14 min
Penalties
6 min
6
Shots
44

20 March 2012; 17:30	Malaysia	13 – 2 (6–2, 3–0, 4–0)	India	Dehradun Arena; Attendance: 476

Game reference

Vincent Shiao
Goalies
Sonam Gurmet (out 35:00)
Sonam Paldan (in 35:00)
Referee:
(Japan) Ichikawa Shunsuke
Linesmen:
(China) Liu Jiaqi
(United Arab Emirates) Henri Neva

	0 – 1	07:12 – A. Belwal
Loke B. (Tan Kh.) – 07:42	1 – 1
Loke B. (Tan Kh.) (PP) – 09:55	2 – 1
Loke B. (Moi J.) (SH) – 14:16	3 – 1
	3 – 2	14:35 – G. Tanshi (PP)
J. Chee (M. Yusoff) – 15:20	4 – 2
Loke B. (R. Isa, Tan Ka.) – 16:48	5 – 2
Tan Kh. – 18:11	6 – 2
Teh T. (J. Chee) (PP) – 23:33	7 – 2
Khoo S. (G. Ong) (PP) – 35:00	8 – 2
Tan Kh. (G. Ong) – 39:48	9 – 2
A. Chang (Moi J.) – 49:12	10 – 2
Loke B. (N. Versluis) – 50:30	11 – 2
Loke B. (Moi J.) – 56:27	12 – 2
A. Abu-Safian – 59:17	13 – 2

12 min
Penalties
12 min
55
Shots
15

21 March 2012; 13:00	Macau	1 – 5 (0–0, 1–2, 0–3)	India	Dehradun Arena; Attendance: 124

Game reference

Lou Kuan Leong
Goalies
Sonam Gurmet
Referee:
(Thailand) Sakchai Chinuvatana
Linesmen:
(South Korea) Chae Young Jin
(United Arab Emirates) Henri Neva

	0 – 1	30:30 - G. Tashi (R. Tundup)
	0 – 2	31:35 - D. Namgail (G. Tashi)
37:24 - U (PP)	1 – 2
	1 – 3	41:25 - R. Tundup (Giri)
	1 – 4	42:34 - Iqbal (Amir)
	1 – 5	59:16 - Punchok

22 min
Penalties
12 min
22
Shots
32

21 March 2012; 21:00	India	2 – 18 (1–5, 0–6, 1–7)	Malaysia	Dehradun Arena; Attendance: 98

Game reference

22 March 2012; 21:00	Malaysia	5 – 2 (2–1, 2–0, 1–1)	Macau	Dehradun Arena; Attendance: 105

Game reference

== Playoff round ==
=== Bracket ===
Qualification play-off
A4	Chinese Taipei	0
B1	Malaysia	3
A3	Kuwait	13
B2	India	2

Semi-finals
A1	United Arab Emirates	15
QP1	Malaysia	0
A2	Thailand	5
QP2	Kuwait	4

Finals
SF1	United Arab Emirates	3
SF2	Thailand	0
Third place
SF1	Malaysia	5
SF2	Kuwait	3

=== Qualification play-off ===
23 March 2012; 17:00	Chinese Taipei	0 – 3 (0–1, 0–2, 0–0)	Malaysia	Dehradun Arena; Attendance: 197

Game reference

23 March 2012; 20:00	Kuwait	13 – 2 (4–1, 4–1, 5–0)	India	Dehradun Arena; Attendance: 112

Game reference

=== Semi-finals ===
24 March 2012; 17:00	United Arab Emirates	15 – 0 (6–0, 7–0, 2–0)	Malaysia	Dehradun Arena; Attendance: 312

Game reference

24 March 2012; 20:00	Thailand	5 – 4 (0–1, 2–2, 3–1)	Kuwait	Dehradun Arena; Attendance: 337

Game reference

=== Bronze medal game ===
25 March 2012; 17:00	Malaysia	5 – 3 (2–1, 1–1, 2–1)	Kuwait	Dehradun Arena; Attendance: 280

Game reference

=== Gold medal game ===
25 March 2012; 20:00	United Arab Emirates	3 – 0 (0–0, 2–0, 1–0)	Thailand	Dehradun Arena; Attendance: 1113

Game reference

== Ranking and statistics ==
=== Final standings ===
1st place, gold medalist(s)	United Arab Emirates
2nd place, silver medalist(s)	Thailand
3rd place, bronze medalist(s)	Malaysia
4	Kuwait
5	Chinese Taipei
6	India
7	Macau

=== Scoring leaders ===
List shows the top ten skaters sorted by points, then goals, assists, and the lower penalties in minutes.

Player	GP	G	A	Pts	+/-	PIM	POS
(Malaysia) Loke Ban Kin	7	16	11	27	+20	8	F
(Thailand) Tewin Chartsuwan	5	11	5	16	+17	4	F
(United Arab Emirates) Juma al-Dhaheri	5	6	9	15	+13	4	F
(Kuwait) Meshal al-Ajmi	6	12	2	14	+6	35	D
(Malaysia) Tan Khia Peng	7	7	7	14	+17	4	F
(United Arab Emirates) Suhail al-Mehairi	5	4	8	12	+14	0	F
(Thailand) Teerasak Rattanachot	5	5	6	11	+16	4	F
(Kuwait) Mohammad al-Ajmi	6	4	7	11	-5	4	F
(Malaysia) Moi Jia Yung	7	2	9	11	+13	4	D
(Malaysia) Brandon Tan Wai Kin	7	5	5	10	+15	2	F

=== Leading goaltenders ===
Only the top goaltenders, based on save percentage, who have played at least 40% of their team's minutes are included in this list.

Player	MIP	SOG	GA	GAA	SVS%
(United Arab Emirates) Khaled al-Suwaidi	240:00	49	0	0.00	100.00
(Thailand) Prawes Kaewjeen	160:00	49	5	1.88	89.80
(Malaysia) Tengku Muhd Azlly Tengku Abdillah	225:10	98	11	2.93	88.78
(Thailand) Pattarapol Ungkulpattanasuk	140:00	56	8	3.43	85.71
(Kuwait) Jasem al-Sarraf	321:29	179	28	5.23	84.36
