= 2017 IIHF Challenge Cup of Asia – Division I =

2017 IIHF Challenge Cup of Asia Division I
Tournament details
- Host country: Kuwait
- Venue(s): 1 (in 1 host city)
- Dates: 22–25 April 2017
- Teams: 4

Final positions
- Champions: Kuwait (2nd title)
- Runners-up: India
- Third place: Oman

Tournament statistics
- Games played: 6
- Goals scored: 104 (17.33 per game)
- Attendance: 1,048 (175 per game)
- Scoring leader(s): (Kuwait) Ahmad Al Ajmi (17 points)

The 2017 IIHF Challenge Cup of Asia Division I was the fourth IIHF Challenge Cup of Asia Division I tournament, an annual international ice hockey tournament held by the International Ice Hockey Federation (IIHF). It took place between 22 and 25 April 2017 in Kuwait City, Kuwait. The host Kuwait won the tournament and was promoted to the 2018 IIHF Challenge Cup of Asia.

== Participants ==
Team	2016 Results
Kuwait	Host, did not participate last year. Last participation in 2015.
Macau	Finished 3rd place in Division I last year.
India	Finished 5th place in Division I last year.
Oman	Did not participate last year. First participation since 2015.

== Standings ==
Pos	Team	Pld	W	OTW	OTL	L	GF	GA	GD	Pts	Promotion
1	Kuwait	3	3	0	0	0	29	5	+24	9	Promoted to Top Division 2018
2	India	3	2	0	0	1	15	13	+2	6	
3	Oman	3	1	0	0	2	4	17	−13	3	
4	Macau	3	0	0	0	3	4	17	−13	0	

Source: EuroHockey

=== Results ===
India 3:2 (1:0, 0:2, 2:0) Oman

Kuwait 8:0 (3:0, 2:0, 3:0) Macau

Macau 1:2 (0:1, 0:1, 1:0) Oman

India 5:8 (3:4, 0:0, 2:4) Kuwait

Macau 3:7 (3:3, 0:1, 0:3) India

Oman 0:13 (0:5, 0:5, 0:3) Kuwait
