= Mongolia men's national ice hockey team =

National ice hockey team representing Mongolia

Mongolia
- Association: Mongolian Hockey Federation
- Head coach: Mergen Arslan
- Assistants: Munkhnasan Otgonbayar
- Captain: Mishigsuren Chinzolboo
- Most games: Mishigsuren Namjil (67)
- Top scorer: Mishigsuren Namjil (40)
- Most points: Mishigsuren Namjil (94)
- Home stadium: Steppe Arena
- Team colors
- IIHF code: MGL
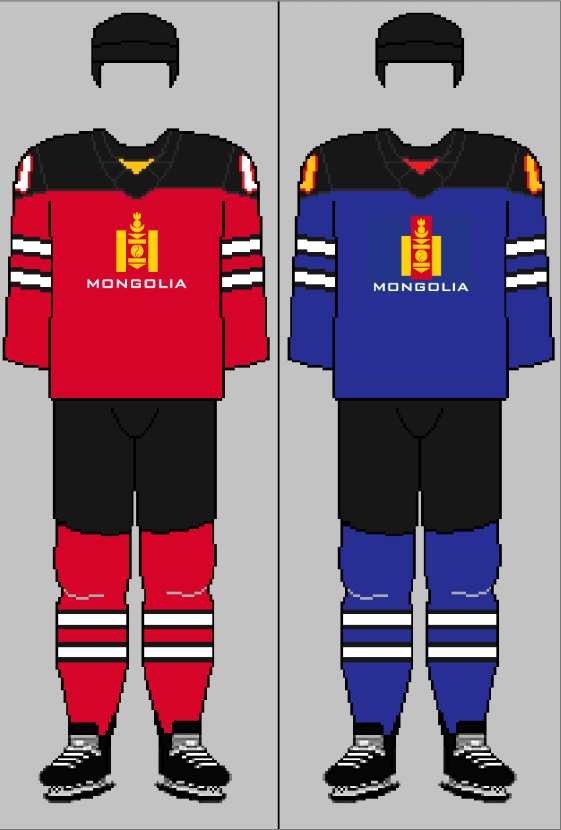

Ranking
- Current IIHF: NR (3 June 2026)
- Highest IIHF: 45 (2008–10)
- Lowest IIHF: 57 (2023–24)

First international
- South Korea 14–1 Mongolia (Gangneung, South Korea; 31 January 1999)

Biggest win
- Mongolia 21–1 Bahrain (Astana, Kazakhstan; 1 February 2011); Mongolia 20–0 India (Bangkok, Thailand; 16 March 2013)

Biggest defeat
- Kazakhstan 40–0 Mongolia (Gangneung, South Korea; 2 February 1999)

IIHF World Championships
- Appearances: 9 (first in 2007)
- Best result: 45th (2007)

Asian Winter Games
- Appearances: 4 (first in 1999)
- Best result: 5th (1999)

IIHF Challenge Cup of Asia
- Appearances: 9 (first in 2009)
- Best result: 1st (2018, 2019)

International record (W–L–T)
- 41–66–0

Medal record

IIHF Challenge Cup of Asia
Gold medal – first place	2018 Pasay	
Gold medal – first place	2019 Kuala Lumpur	
Silver medal – second place	2017 Bangkok	
Bronze medal – third place	2013 Bangkok	
Bronze medal – third place	2014 Abu Dhabi	
Bronze medal – third place	2015 Taipei City	
Bronze medal – third place	2016 Abu Dhabi	

The Mongolia national ice hockey team (Mongolian: Монголын хоккейн үндэсний шигшээ баг) is the national ice hockey team of Mongolia. They are controlled by the Mongolian Hockey Federation and a member of the International Ice Hockey Federation (IIHF) since 15 May 1999. Mongolia competed in several World Championship tournaments in the late 2000s and early 2010s before withdrawing from the program after 2013. During that period, the team only took part in the Challenge Cup of Asia, a regional tournament for lower-tier hockey nations in Asia. Mongolia returned to the World Championship in 2023 and currently plays in Division IIIB.

Mongolia is currently ranked 53rd in the IIHF World Ranking and 19th in the specialized Asian ranking.

== History ==
Mongolia made its debut at the 1999 Asian Winter Games. The national team did not participate in any IIHF tournaments until the 2007 IIHF World Championship Division III tournament in Ireland. They played four games, losing all four by a combined margin of three goals for to 45 goals against. In 2008, Mongolia played in the IIHF World Championship Division III tournament in Luxembourg, and again they lost all of their games. Goal margin was 11 goals for and 59 against in five games. In the 2009 tournament, they chose to forfeit the games and withdrew from the tournament. All of the games were marked as 5–0 forfeits towards the team. In 2010, the team was placed in group B of Division III. They started off the tournament against North Korea, and they lost (22–1). Then they lost to South Africa (12–1) and to Armenia (15–0). Goal margin was 2 goals and 49 against. They finished the tournament with a 3rd place rematch against South Africa. Mongolia scored three times, but it was not enough as South Africa won 8–3. Mongolia however finished the tournament with its first-ever podium position, finishing third overall in the group after Armenia was suspended by the IIHF.

Many players also represent the Mongolia national bandy team.

== Withdrawal from 2009 and 2011 IIHF tournaments ==
The Mongolian Hockey Federation announced that their men's and U18 teams would not be participating in the 2011 IIHF tournaments due to financial trouble and lack of ice hockey equipment. Mongolia cancelled their trips to their respective tournaments. Mongolia men's team was scheduled to travel to Cape Town, South Africa to participate in Division III, while the U18 team was scheduled to participate in Division III in Taipei City, Taiwan. They had previously withdrawn from the 2009 Division III tournament as well.

== Tournament record ==
=== World Championships ===
Year	Host	Result	Pld	W	OTW	OTL	L
1930 through 1998		Not an IIHF member					
1999 through 2006		did not enter					
2007	(Republic of Ireland) Dundalk	45th place (5th in Division III)	4	0	0	0	4
2008	(Luxembourg) Kockelscheuer	46th place (6th in Division III)	5	0	0	0	5
2009	(New Zealand) Dunedin	Withdrew from tournament (All games marked as 5–0 forfeits)					
2010	(Armenia) Yerevan	48th place (4th in Division III B)	3	0	0	0	3
2011	(South Africa) Cape Town	Withdrew from tournament (All games marked as 5–0 forfeits)					
2012	(Turkey) Erzurum	46th place (6th in Division III)	5	0	0	0	5
2013	(United Arab Emirates) Abu Dhabi	47th place (3rd in Division III Q)	3	1	0	0	2
2014 through 2022		did not participate (Due to lack of indoor ice rink in Mongolia)					
2023	(Mongolia) Ulaanbaatar	54th place (2nd in Division IV)	3	2	0	1	0
2024	Kuwait City	53rd place 1st in (Division IV)	3	3	0	0	0
2025	(Mexico) Queretaro	50th place (4th in Division III B)	5	2	0	0	3
2026	Hong Kong	51st place (5th in Division III B)	5	1	0	0	4
2027 to be determined
Total		6/16	36	9	0	1	26

=== Asian Winter Games ===
Year	Host	Result	Pld	W	OTW	OTL	L	GF	GA	GD
1986 through 1996		did not enter								
1999	(South Korea) Gangneung	5th place	3	0	1	0	2	6	58	-52
2003	(Japan) Aomori	6th place	3	0	0	0	3	4	52	-48
2007	(China) Changchun	did not participate								
2011	(Kazakhstan) Astana	9th place (4th in Premier Division)	6	3	0	0	3	35	37	-2
2017	(Japan) Sapporo	8th place (4th in Division I)	5	2	0	0	3	25	23	+2
2025	(China) Harbin	did not participate								
Total		4/9	17	5	1	0	11	70	170	-100

=== Challenge Cup of Asia ===
Year	Host	Result	Pld	W	OTW	OTL	L
2008	Hong Kong	did not participate					
2009	(United Arab Emirates) Abu Dhabi	5th place	5	3	0	0	2
2010	(Chinese Taipei) Taipei City	6th place	5	1	0	0	4
2011 through 2012		did not participate					
2013	(Thailand) Bangkok	3rd place	7	5	0	0	2
2014	(United Arab Emirates) Abu Dhabi	3rd place	5	3	0	0	2
2015	(Chinese Taipei) Taipei City	3rd place	4	2	0	0	2
2016	(United Arab Emirates) Abu Dhabi	3rd place	4	2	0	0	2
2017	(Thailand) Bangkok	2nd place	4	3	0	1	0
2018	(Philippines) Pasay	1st place	4	3	0	0	1
2019	(Malaysia) Kuala Lumpur	1st place	5	4	0	0	1
2020	Singapore	Cancelled due to the COVID-19 pandemic					
Total		9/13	43	26	0	1	16

== Fixture and results ==
=== 2026 ===
All times are local (UTC+8).

13 April 2026; 13:00	Uzbekistan	26–1 (11–0, 7–1, 8–0)	Mongolia	DB Ice Rink, Hong Kong; Attendance: 103

Game reference

Daniel Muratov
Rustam Irgashev
Goalies
Munkhbold Bayarsaikhan
Sodbileg Baatarkhuu
Referee:
(Netherlands) Nicolaas van Grinsven
Linesmen:
(Australia) Nicholas Air
(Hong Kong) Ka Hei Chan

Kravchenko (Nazarevich) – 04:24	1–0
Golubovich (Kogan, Khabibov) – 04:36	2–0
Khusanboev (Tillyakhodjaev, Azimov) – 04:48	3–0
Dorofeev (Kravchenko, Kogan) (PP) – 11:15	4–0
Tillyakhodjaev (Dadakhodjaev, Azimov) – 11:45	5–0
Rasulov (Nazarevich, Petrosyan) – 13:32	6–0
Jilov (Kravchenko, Kogan) – 13:40	7–0
Jilov (Dorofeev, Kravchenko) – 14:35	8–0
Kogan (Rustamkhonov, Sultanov) – 17:01	9–0
Sinyavskiy (Khusanboev, Rasulov) – 17:27	10–0
Kravchenko (Dadakhodjaev, Nazarevich) – 19:02	11–0
Azimov (Rustamkhovov) – 27:10	12–0
Kravchenko (Khabibov) – 29:43	13–0
Petrosyan (Azimov, Dadakhodjaev) – 31:52	14–0
Tillyakhodjaev (Kogan) – 32:43	15–0
	15–1	33:59 – Naranbaatar (Ankhbayar, Batorovich)
Rustamkhonov – 36:30	16–1
Jilov (Dorofeev, Petrosyan) – 38:31	17–1
Sinyavskiy (Rasulov, Nazarevich) – 39:56	18–1
Nazarevich (Golubovich) – 41:38	19–1
Azimov (Kogan, Khabibov) – 42:57	20–1
Maltsev – 43:48	21–1
Azimov (Khusanboev, Maltsev) – 47:22	22–1
Sinyavskiy (Rasulov) – 51:08	23–1
Kravchenko (Sinyavskiy) (SH) – 54:10	24–1
Rustamkhovov (Dadakhodjaev, Azimov) – 56:49	25–1
Maltsev (Rasulov, Sinyavskiy) – 59:20	26–1

2 min
Penalties
2 min
78
Shots
21

14 April 2026; 16:30	Luxembourg	7-5 (1–2, 5–1, 1–2)	Mongolia	DB Ice Rink, Hong Kong; Attendance: 89

Game reference

Jesse Barbadillo
Goalies
Munkhbold Bayarsaikhan
Sodbileg Baatarkhuu
Referee:
(Thailand) Aomsin Ubolluck
Linesmen:
(Hong Kong) Chan Ka Hei
(Croatia) Tomislav Grozaj

	0–1	12:25 – Mishigsuren (Batorovich, Undarmaa)
Cannon (Cap, Thomas) – 15:28	1–1
	1–2	16:08 – Mishigsuren
Fleischmann (Toft) – 22:42	2–2
Toft (Fleischmann, Nunes) – 27:27	3–2
Vass (Church, Springer) – 28:26	4–2
	4–3	33:29 – Batorovich
Vass – 36:35	5–3
Cannon (Zrika, Cap) – 36:51	6–3
	6–4	43:49 – Batorovich (Mishigsuren, Undarmaa) (PP)
	6–5	45:06 – Batsaikhan (Ider)
Stroppolo (Beran) – 57:05	7–5

10 min
Penalties
2 min
43
Shots
48

16 April 2026; 20:00	Hong Kong	11–2 (3–1, 2–0, 7–1)	Mongolia	DB Ice Rink, Hong Kong; Attendance: 290

Game reference

Hoi Hei Fung
Goalies
Munkhbold Bayarsaikhan
Sodbileg Baatarkhuu
Referee:
(Spain) Carlos Trobajo
Linesmen:
(Australia) Nicholas Air
(Singapore) Benjaming Huang

Cheng (Zheng) – 03:46	1–0
Wong W. (Shum, Tang) (PP)	2–0
	2–1	17:23 – Mishigsuren (Purevdavaa, Ankhbayar)
Tang (Cheng, Chu) (PP) – 18:32	3–1
Tang (PS) – 25:56	4–1
Yam Yau (Lee, Ngan) (PP) – 37:45	5–1
Tang – 40:16	6–1
Ngan (Shum, Wong W) (PP) – 41:34	7–1
Tang (Chu) (PP) – 43:18	8–1
Wat (Zheng, Ngan) – 44:36	9–1
Chu – 49:29	10–1
Chu (Wat, Tang) (PP) – 51:11	11–1
	11–2	57:17 – Mishigsuren (Undarmaa, Purevdorj)

20 min
Penalties
35 min
46
Shots
45

17 April 2026; 16:30	Mongolia	6-8 (1–3, 3–3, 2–2)	North Korea	DB Ice Rink, Hong Kong; Attendance: 138

Game reference

Munkhbold Bayarsaikhan
Goalies
Kim Kang-gun
Referee:
(Chinese Taipei) Shen Yen-chin
Linesmen:
(Hong Kong) Chan Ka Hei
(Slovakia) Miroslav Tvrdoň

	0–1	02:41 – Pak C. (Rim)
	0–2	06:05 – Ri (Kim I., Pak K.)
Purevdavaa (Batorovich) – 09:58	1–2
	1–3	12:29 – Kim Kw. (Han I., Kim Ku.)
Naranbaatar (Ankhbayar, Mishigsuren) (PP) – 22:52	2–3
Mishigsuren (Batorovich, Ider) (PP) – 24:24	3–3
	3–4	26:38 – Pak C. (Kim C.) (SH)
	3–5	28:04 – Kim Ki. (Pak K.)
Naranbaatar (Batorovich, Davaanyam) – 37:01	4–5
	4–6	39:36 – Han I. (Kim Kw., Kim Ku.)
Baatarkhuu (Batorovich) – 47:16	5–6
	5–7	52:34 – Pak Y. (Hwang, Pak K.)
Batorovich (Mishigsuren) – 55:52	6–7
	6–8	59:59 – Pak Y. (Kim I., Pak K.) (SH, EN)

4 min
Penalties
29 min
36
Shots
48

19 April 2026; 13:00	Mongolia	13-4 (2–1, 9–1, 2–2)	Philippines	DB Ice Rink, Hong Kong; Attendance: 263

Game reference
12 min	Penalties	8 min
38	Shots	35

== All-time record against other national teams ==
Last match update: 19 April 2026

Key
Positive balance (more Wins)
Neutral balance (Wins = Losses)
Negative balance (more Losses)

Team	GP	W	T	L	GF	GA
Armenia (Note: Mongolia's first match against Armenia was additionally changed to a 5–0 win for Mongolia by IIHF decision. Original result was 0-15 for Armenia. The match took place within 2010 IIHF World Championship Division III.)	1	1	0	0	5	0
Bahrain	1	1	0	0	21	1
Chinese Taipei	5	0	0	5	9	49
Georgia	1	1	0	0	6	0
Greece	5	0	0	5	7	29
Hong Kong	7	2	0	5	28	37
India	2	2	0	0	30	0
Indonesia	2	2	0	0	14	4
Ireland	3	0	0	3	4	24
Israel	1	0	0	1	0	5
Kazakhstan	2	0	0	2	1	65
Kuwait	8	8	0	0	50	12
Kyrgyzstan	1	0	0	1	3	13
Luxembourg	6	0	0	6	7	39
Macau	3	3	0	0	18	3
Malaysia	6	5	0	1	53	27
Mexico	1	0	0	1	6	7
New Zealand	2	0	0	2	1	15
North Korea	4	0	0	4	9	59
Philippines	5	2	0	3	33	26
Singapore	7	7	0	0	58	9
South Africa	5	0	0	5	9	51
South Korea	2	0	0	2	2	37
Thailand	10	6	0	4	46	37
Turkey	4	0	0	4	3	31
Uzbekistan	1	0	0	1	1	26
United Arab Emirates	8	0	0	8	13	38
Total	97	39	0	58	404	583
