= 2015 IIHF Challenge Cup of Asia =

Tournament details
- Host country: Taiwan
- Venue(s): 1 (in 1 host city)
- Dates: 14 – 19 March 2015
- Teams: 5

Final positions
- Champions: Chinese Taipei (5th title)
- Runner-up: United Arab Emirates
- Third place: Mongolia

Tournament statistics
- Games played: 10
- Goals scored: 101 (10.1 per game)

The 2015 IIHF Challenge Cup of Asia became the 8th IIHF Challenge Cup of Asia, an annual international ice hockey tournament held by the International Ice Hockey Federation (IIHF). It took place between 14 and 19 March 2015 in Taipei, Taiwan.

== Top Division ==
Participants
Team	2014 Results
Chinese Taipei	Host, Won gold medal in 2014
United Arab Emirates	Won silver medal in 2014
Mongolia	Won bronze medal in 2014
Thailand	4th place in 2014
Macau	Winner of Division I in 2014

=== Preliminary round ===
Pos	Team	Pld	W	OTW	OTL	L	GF	GA	GD	Pts	Qualification
1st place, gold medalist(s)	Chinese Taipei	4	4	0	0	0	52	6	+46	12	Gold medal
2nd place, silver medalist(s)	United Arab Emirates	4	3	0	0	1	22	8	+14	9	Silver medal
3rd place, bronze medalist(s)	Mongolia	4	2	0	0	2	17	17	0	6	Bronze medal
4	Thailand	4	1	0	0	3	8	21	−13	3	
5	Macau	4	0	0	0	4	2	49	−47	0	Relegated to Division I 2016

Source: IIHF

== Division I ==
The Division I competition was played between 18 and 25 April 2015 in Kuwait City, Kuwait.

Participants
Team	2014 Results
Kuwait	Host, 6th in Top Division in 2014
Kyrgyzstan	2nd in Division I in 2014
Singapore	3rd in Division I in 2014
India	4th in Division I in 2014
Malaysia	Did not participate in 2014
Oman	No previous participation

=== Preliminary round ===
Pos	Team	Pld	W	OTW	OTL	L	GF	GA	GD	Pts	Promotion
1	Kuwait	5	5	0	0	0	30	8	+22	15	Promoted to Top Division 2016
2	Singapore	5	4	0	0	1	36	11	+25	12	Promoted to Top Division 2016
3	Kyrgyzstan	5	3	0	0	2	27	22	+5	9	
4	Oman	5	0	2	0	3	20	36	−16	4	
5	Malaysia	5	1	0	1	3	29	23	+6	4	
6	India	5	0	0	1	4	12	54	−42	1	

Source: IIHF

== See also ==
- List of sporting events in Taiwan
