= 2018 IIHF Challenge Cup of Asia =

Tournament details
- Host country: Philippines
- Venue(s): 1 (in 1 host city)
- Dates: 3–8 April 2018
- Teams: 5

Final positions
- Champions: Mongolia (1st title)
- Runner-up: Thailand
- Third place: Philippines

Tournament statistics
- Games played: 10
- Goals scored: 106 (10.6 per game)
- Attendance: 2,819 (282 per game)
- Scoring leader(s): (Philippines) Steven Füglister (20 points)

Official website
- IIHF.com

The 2018 IIHF Challenge Cup of Asia was the 11th edition of the IIHF Challenge Cup of Asia, an annual international ice hockey tournament held by the International Ice Hockey Federation (IIHF). The Top Division of the tournament took place from 3 to 8 April 2018 at the SM Mall of Asia Ice Skating Rink in Pasay, Metro Manila, Philippines.

== Top Division ==
=== Participants ===
Team	2017 Results
Philippines	Host, no previous participation.
Mongolia	Won silver medal last year.
Thailand	Won bronze medal last year.
Singapore	Finished 4th place last year.
Kuwait	Winner of Division I last year and were promoted.

==== Match officials ====
3 referees and 7 linesmen were selected for the tournament.

Referees

- (New Zealand) Ryan Cairns
- (Germany) Volker Westhaus
- (Kazakhstan) Vladimir Yefremov

Linesmen

- (United Arab Emirates) Helan Salem Al Ameri
- (China) Chi Hongda
- (Chinese Taipei) Huang Jen-hung
- (Slovakia) Martin Jobbágy
- (Malaysia) Edmond Ng
- (Lithuania) Edvardas Valickas
- (Indonesia) Heru Wardana

=== Standings ===
Pos	Team	Pld	W	OTW	OTL	L	GF	GA	GD	Pts	Qualification or relegation
1	Mongolia (C)	4	3	0	0	1	26	12	+14	9 (Note: Tied teams each had three head-to-head points, on head-to-head goal difference it was: Mongolia +3; Thailand –1; Philippines –2)	Champions
2	Thailand	4	3	0	0	1	31	10	+21	9	Runner-up
3	Philippines (H)	4	3	0	0	1	38	12	+26	9	Third place
4	Singapore	4	0	1	0	3	6	33	−27	2	
5	Kuwait (R)	4	0	0	1	3	5	39	−34	1	Relegated to 2019 Division I

Updated to match(es) played on 8 April 2018. Source: IIHF
Rules for classification: 1) points; 2) head-to-head points; 3) head-to-head goal difference; 4) head-to-head number of goals scored; 5) result against closest best-ranked team outside tied teams; 6) result against second-best ranked team outside tied teams; 7) seeding before tournament.
(C) Champion; (H) Host; (R) Relegated

=== Schedules ===
All times are in Philippine Standard Time (UTC+8).

3 April 2018; 15:30	Singapore	3–5 (1–1, 1–2, 1–2)	Mongolia	SM Mall of Asia Ice Skating Rink, Pasay; Attendance: 79

Game reference
			Referee: (Germany) Volker Westhaus; Linesmen: (United Arab Emirates) Helan Salem Al Ameri (China) Hongda Chi
26 min	Penalties	8 min	Referee: (Germany) Volker Westhaus; Linesmen: (United Arab Emirates) Helan Salem Al Ameri (China) Hongda Chi
8	Shots	38	Referee: (Germany) Volker Westhaus; Linesmen: (United Arab Emirates) Helan Salem Al Ameri (China) Hongda Chi

3 April 2018; 19:15	Philippines	4–7 (2–1, 0–3, 2–3)	Thailand	SM Mall of Asia Ice Skating Rink, Pasay; Attendance: 458

Game reference
			Referee: (Kazakhstan) Vladimir Yefremov; Linesmen: (Slovakia) Martin Jobbágy (Malaysia) Edmond Ng
24 min	Penalties	18 min	Referee: (Kazakhstan) Vladimir Yefremov; Linesmen: (Slovakia) Martin Jobbágy (Malaysia) Edmond Ng
21	Shots	50	Referee: (Kazakhstan) Vladimir Yefremov; Linesmen: (Slovakia) Martin Jobbágy (Malaysia) Edmond Ng

4 April 2018; 19:00	Mongolia	11–2 (1–2, 5–0, 5–0)	Kuwait	SM Mall of Asia Ice Skating Rink, Pasay; Attendance: 48

Game reference
			Referee: (New Zealand) Ryan Cairns; Linesmen: (Chinese Taipei) Huang Jen-hung (Indonesia) Heru Wardana
14 min	Penalties	18 min	Referee: (New Zealand) Ryan Cairns; Linesmen: (Chinese Taipei) Huang Jen-hung (Indonesia) Heru Wardana
66	Shots	14	Referee: (New Zealand) Ryan Cairns; Linesmen: (Chinese Taipei) Huang Jen-hung (Indonesia) Heru Wardana

5 April 2018; 15:30	Thailand	11–0 (4–0, 4–0, 3–0)	Singapore	SM Mall of Asia Ice Skating Rink, Pasay; Attendance: 87

Game reference
			Referee: (Malaysia) Yong Chun Lim; Linesmen: (China) Hongda Chi (Lithuania) Edvardas Valickas
6 min	Penalties	12 min	Referee: (Malaysia) Yong Chun Lim; Linesmen: (China) Hongda Chi (Lithuania) Edvardas Valickas
56	Shots	7	Referee: (Malaysia) Yong Chun Lim; Linesmen: (China) Hongda Chi (Lithuania) Edvardas Valickas

5 April 2018; 19:00	Kuwait	0–13 (0–4, 0–6, 0–3)	Philippines	SM Mall of Asia Ice Skating Rink, Pasay; Attendance: 467

Game reference
			Referee: (Germany) Volker Westhaus; Linesmen: (United Arab Emirates) Helan Salem Al Ameri (Chinese Taipei) Huang Jen-hung
18 min	Penalties	20 min	Referee: (Germany) Volker Westhaus; Linesmen: (United Arab Emirates) Helan Salem Al Ameri (Chinese Taipei) Huang Jen-hung
18	Shots	45	Referee: (Germany) Volker Westhaus; Linesmen: (United Arab Emirates) Helan Salem Al Ameri (Chinese Taipei) Huang Jen-hung

6 April 2018; 19:00	Philippines	6–5 (3–2, 2–1, 1–2)	Mongolia	SM Mall of Asia Ice Skating Rink, Pasay; Attendance: 423

Game reference
			Referee: (New Zealand) Ryan Cairns; Linesmen: (Slovakia) Martin Jobbágy (Malaysia) Edmond Ng
43 min	Penalties	30 min	Referee: (New Zealand) Ryan Cairns; Linesmen: (Slovakia) Martin Jobbágy (Malaysia) Edmond Ng
29	Shots	42	Referee: (New Zealand) Ryan Cairns; Linesmen: (Slovakia) Martin Jobbágy (Malaysia) Edmond Ng

7 April 2018; 15:30	Mongolia	5–1 (1–0, 3–1, 1–0)	Thailand	SM Mall of Asia Ice Skating Rink, Pasay; Attendance: 254

Game reference
			Referee: (Malaysia) Yong Chun Lim; Linesmen: (United Arab Emirates) Helan Salem Al Ameri (Indonesia) Heru Wardana
8 min	Penalties	10 min	Referee: (Malaysia) Yong Chun Lim; Linesmen: (United Arab Emirates) Helan Salem Al Ameri (Indonesia) Heru Wardana
37	Shots	23	Referee: (Malaysia) Yong Chun Lim; Linesmen: (United Arab Emirates) Helan Salem Al Ameri (Indonesia) Heru Wardana

7 April 2018; 19:00	Kuwait	2–3 GWS (0–1, 1–1, 1–0) (OT: 0–0) (SO: 0–1)	Singapore	SM Mall of Asia Ice Skating Rink, Pasay; Attendance: 125

Game reference
			Referee: (Kazakhstan) Vladimir Yefremov; Linesmen: (Chinese Taipei) Huang Jen-hung (Lithuania) Edvardas Valickas
6 min	Penalties	14 min	Referee: (Kazakhstan) Vladimir Yefremov; Linesmen: (Chinese Taipei) Huang Jen-hung (Lithuania) Edvardas Valickas
24	Shots	29	Referee: (Kazakhstan) Vladimir Yefremov; Linesmen: (Chinese Taipei) Huang Jen-hung (Lithuania) Edvardas Valickas

8 April 2018; 15:30	Thailand	12–1 (2–0, 6–1, 4–0)	Kuwait	SM Mall of Asia Ice Skating Rink, Pasay; Attendance: 365

Game reference
			Referee: (New Zealand) Ryan Cairns; Linesmen: (China) Hongda Chi (Malaysia) Edmond Ng
4 min	Penalties	12 min	Referee: (New Zealand) Ryan Cairns; Linesmen: (China) Hongda Chi (Malaysia) Edmond Ng
48	Shots	11	Referee: (New Zealand) Ryan Cairns; Linesmen: (China) Hongda Chi (Malaysia) Edmond Ng

8 April 2018; 19:00	Singapore	0–15 (0–5, 0–6, 0–4)	Philippines	SM Mall of Asia Ice Skating Rink, Pasay; Attendance: 513

Game reference
			Referee: (Malaysia) Yong Chun Lim; Linesmen: (United Arab Emirates) Helan Salem Al Ameri (Lithuania) Edvardas Valickas
6 min	Penalties	6 min	Referee: (Malaysia) Yong Chun Lim; Linesmen: (United Arab Emirates) Helan Salem Al Ameri (Lithuania) Edvardas Valickas
9	Shots	49	Referee: (Malaysia) Yong Chun Lim; Linesmen: (United Arab Emirates) Helan Salem Al Ameri (Lithuania) Edvardas Valickas

== Division I ==
2018 IIHF Challenge Cup of Asia Division I
Tournament details
- Host country: Malaysia
- Venue(s): 1 (in 1 host city)
- Dates: 24–29 March 2018
- Teams: 4

Final positions
- Champions: Malaysia (1st title)
- Runner-up: Macau
- Third place: Indonesia

Tournament statistics
- Games played: 10
- Goals scored: 83 (8.3 per game)
- Attendance: 2,949 (295 per game)
- Scoring leader(s): (Malaysia) Ban Kin Loke & (Malaysia) Bryan Lim (19 points)

Official website
- IIHF.com

The Division I competition was played from 24 to 29 March 2018 in Kuala Lumpur, Malaysia.

Participants

Team	2017 Results
Malaysia	Host, finished 5th place in Top Division last year and were relegated.
India	Runner-up of Division I last year.
Macau	Finished 4th place in Division I last year.
Indonesia	No previous participation.

Final ranking

Promoted to 2019 IIHF Challenge Cup of Asia

Rank	Team
1	Malaysia (H, P)
2	Macau
3	Indonesia
4	India

(H) Host; (P) Promoted.
Source: IIHF
