= 2027 IIHF World Championship Division IV =

Ice hockey world championships

Tournament details
- Host countries: Kuwait; Malaysia
- Venues: 2 (in 2 host cities)
- Dates: 20–26 March; TBD
- Teams: 8

The 2027 IIHF World Championship Division IV consists of two international ice hockey tournaments organized by the International Ice Hockey Federation. Divisions IV A and IV B represent the eighth and ninth tier of the IIHF Ice Hockey World Championships.

As last year's tournament was cancelled, no team was promoted or relegated.

== Group A tournament ==
2027 IIHF World Championship Division IV A

Tournament details
- Host country: Kuwait
- City: Kuwait City
- Venue: 1 (in 1 host city)
- Dates: 20–26 March
- Teams: 4

The tournament will be played in Kuwait City, Kuwait from 20 to 26 March 2027.

=== Participants ===
Team	Qualification
Singapore	Placed 6th in Division III B in 2025 and were relagated.
Armenia	Placed 2nd in Division IV in 2025.
Kuwait	Host, placed 3rd in Division IV in 2025.
Indonesia	Placed 4th in Division IV in 2025.

=== Standings ===
Pos	Team	Pld	W	OTW	OTL	L	GF	GA	GD	Pts	Promotion or relegation
1	Singapore	0	0	0	0	0	0	0	0	0	Promoted to 2028 Division III B
2	Armenia	0	0	0	0	0	0	0	0	0	
3	Kuwait (H)	0	0	0	0	0	0	0	0	0	
4	Indonesia	0	0	0	0	0	0	0	0	0	Relegated to 2028 Division IV B

First match(es) will be played: 20 March 2027. Source:
Rules for classification: 1) points; 2) head-to-head points; 3) head-to-head goal difference; 4) head-to-head number of goals scored; 5) result against closest best-ranked team outside tied teams; 6) result against second-best ranked team outside tied teams; 7) seeding before tournament.
(H) Host

== Group B tournament ==
2027 IIHF World Championship Division IV B
Tournament details
- Host country: Malaysia
- City: Kuala Lumpur
- Venue: 1 (in 1 host city)
- Teams: 4

The tournament will be played in Kuala Lumpur, Malaysia.

=== Participants ===
Team	Qualification
Iran	Placed 5th in Division IV in 2025.
Malaysia	Placed 6th in Division IV in 2025.
India	First time participating.
Morocco	First time participating.

=== Standings ===
Pos	Team	Pld	W	OTW	OTL	L	GF	GA	GD	Pts	Promotion
1	Iran	0	0	0	0	0	0	0	0	0	Promoted to 2028 Division IV A
2	Malaysia (H)	0	0	0	0	0	0	0	0	0	
3	India	0	0	0	0	0	0	0	0	0	
4	Morocco	0	0	0	0	0	0	0	0	0	

First match(es) will be played: 2027. Source:
Rules for classification: 1) points; 2) head-to-head points; 3) head-to-head goal difference; 4) head-to-head number of goals scored; 5) result against closest best-ranked team outside tied teams; 6) result against second-best ranked team outside tied teams; 7) seeding before tournament.
(H) Host
