= 2016 IIHF Challenge Cup of Asia =

Tournament details
- Host country: United Arab Emirates
- Venue: 1 (in 1 host city)
- Dates: 12 – 18 March 2016
- Teams: 5

Final positions
- Champions: Chinese Taipei (6th title)
- Runners-up: United Arab Emirates
- Third place: Mongolia

Tournament statistics
- Games played: 10
- Goals scored: 101 (10.1 per game)
- Attendance: 1,503 (150 per game)

Awards
- MVP: (Chinese Taipei) To Weng

The 2016 IIHF Challenge Cup of Asia was the 9th IIHF Challenge Cup of Asia, an annual international ice hockey tournament held by the International Ice Hockey Federation (IIHF). It took place between 12 and 18 March 2016 in Abu Dhabi, United Arab Emirates.

== Top Division ==
Participants
Team	2014 Results
Chinese Taipei	Won gold medal in 2015
Mongolia	Won bronze medal in 2015
Singapore	Runner up of Division I in 2015
Thailand	4th place in 2015
United Arab Emirates	Host, Won silver medal in 2015

=== Preliminary round ===
Pos	Team	Pld	W	OTW	OTL	L	GF	GA	GD	Pts	Result
1st place, gold medalist(s)	Chinese Taipei	4	4	0	0	0	46	6	+40	12	Gold medal
2nd place, silver medalist(s)	United Arab Emirates	4	3	0	0	1	17	7	+10	9	Silver medal
3rd place, bronze medalist(s)	Mongolia	4	2	0	0	2	21	26	−5	6	Bronze medal
4	Thailand	4	1	0	0	3	12	22	−10	3	
5	Singapore	4	0	0	0	4	5	37	−32	0	Possible relegated to Division I 2017

Source: IIHF

=== Awards and statistics ===
==== Awards ====
- Media All-Stars:
  - MVP: (Chinese Taipei) To Weng
  - Goalkeeper: (United Arab Emirates) Ahmed Ald Dhaheri
  - Defenceman: (Chinese Taipei) Yen-Lin Shen
  - Forward: (Chinese Taipei) Hung-Ju Lin

==== Scoring Leaders ====
Player	GP	G	A	Pts	+/−	PIM
(Chinese Taipei) To Weng	4	14	5	19	+22	8
(Chinese Taipei) Hung-Ju Lin	4	8	8	16	+22	4
(Chinese Taipei) Yen-Lin Shen	4	3	12	15	+22	4
(Chinese Taipei) Yen-Chin Shen	4	4	10	14	+19	4
(Mongolia) Mishigsuren Namjil	4	4	4	8	-1	6

GP = Games played; G = Goals; A = Assists; Pts = Points; +/− = Plus/minus; PIM = Penalties in minutes

Source: IIHF.com

==== Goaltending leaders ====
Only the top five goaltenders, based on save percentage, who have played at least 40% of their team's minutes, are included in this list.

Player	TOI	GA	GAA	SA	Sv%	SO
(Chinese Taipei) Yu-Cheng Liao	185:16	4	1.30	64	93.75	0
(United Arab Emirates) Ahmed Al Dhaheri	160:00	6	2.25	53	88.68	0
(Thailand) Pirapong Lertkitsiri	236:12	20	5.08	116	85.29	0
(Singapore) Khai Shene Eugene Chin	156.52	22	8.41	98	77.55	0
(Mongolia) Munkhbold Bayarsaikhan	194:00	19	5.88	80	76.25	0

TOI = Time on ice (minutes:seconds); SA = Shots against; GA = Goals against; GAA = Goals against average; Sv% = Save percentage; SO = Shutouts

Source: IIHF.com

== Division I ==
The Division I competition was played between 9 and 14 April 2016 in Bishkek, Kyrgyzstan.

2016 IIHF Challenge Cup of Asia Division 1
Tournament details
- Host country: Kyrgyzstan
- Venue: 1 (in 1 host city)
- Dates: 9 – 14 April 2016
- Teams: 5

Final positions
- Champions: Kyrgyzstan (1st title)

Tournament statistics
- Games played: 10
- Goals scored: 96 (9.6 per game)
- Attendance: 3,445 (345 per game)

Awards
- MVP: (Kyrgyzstan) Oleg Kolodii

Participants
Team	2015 Results
India	Did not participate in 2015
Kyrgyzstan	Host, 3rd in Division I in 2015
Macau	Relegated from Top Division in 2015
Malaysia	5th in Division I in 2015
Qatar	No previous participation

=== Preliminary round ===
Pos	Team	Pld	W	OTW	OTL	L	GF	GA	GD	Pts	Promotion
1	Kyrgyzstan	4	4	0	0	0	37	7	+30	12	Promoted to Top Division 2017
2	Malaysia	4	3	0	0	1	25	16	+9	9	Promoted to Top Division 2017
3	Macau	4	1	1	0	2	13	21	−8	5	
4	Qatar	4	1	0	0	3	7	18	−11	3	
5	India	4	0	0	1	3	14	34	−20	1	

Source: IIHF
