= Thailand men's national ice hockey team =

Thailand
- Association: Ice Hockey Association of Thailand
- General manager: Suwanna Silpa-Archa
- Head coach: Tewin Chartsuwan
- Captain: Msasato Kitayama
- Most games: Tewin Chartsuwan (92)
- Top scorer: Tewin Chartsuwan (87)
- Most points: Tewin Chartsuwan (154)
- Team colors
- IIHF code: THA

Ranking
- Current IIHF: 36 ▼1 (3 June 2026)
- Highest IIHF: 40 (2025)
- Lowest IIHF: 51 (2019)

First international
- Japan 39–0 Thailand (Aomori, Japan; 2 February 2003)

Biggest win
- Thailand 29–0 Bahrain (Astana, Kazakhstan; 29 January 2011); Thailand 29–0 India (Kuwait City, Kuwait; 25 April 2011)

Biggest defeat
- Kazakhstan 52–1 Thailand (Changchun, China; 29 January 2007)

IIHF World Championships
- Appearances: 6 (first in 2019)
- Best result: 40th (2025)

Asian Winter Games
- Appearances: 5 (first in 2003)
- Best result: 5th (2003, 2017)

IIHF Challenge Cup of Asia
- Appearances: 11 (first in 2008)
- Best result: 2nd (2009, 2012, 2018)

Southeast Asian Games
- Appearances: 1 (first in 2017)
- Best result: 1st (2019)

International record (W–L–T)
- 71–58–1

Medal record

Challenge Cup of Asia
Silver medal – second place	2009 Abu Dhabi	
Silver medal – second place	2012 Dehradun	
Silver medal – second place	2018 Pasay	
Bronze medal – third place	2010 Taipei	
Bronze medal – third place	2011 Kuwait City	
Bronze medal – third place	2017 Bangkok	

Southeast Asian Games
Gold medal – first place	2019 Philippines	Team
Silver medal – second place	2017 Kuala Lumpur	Team

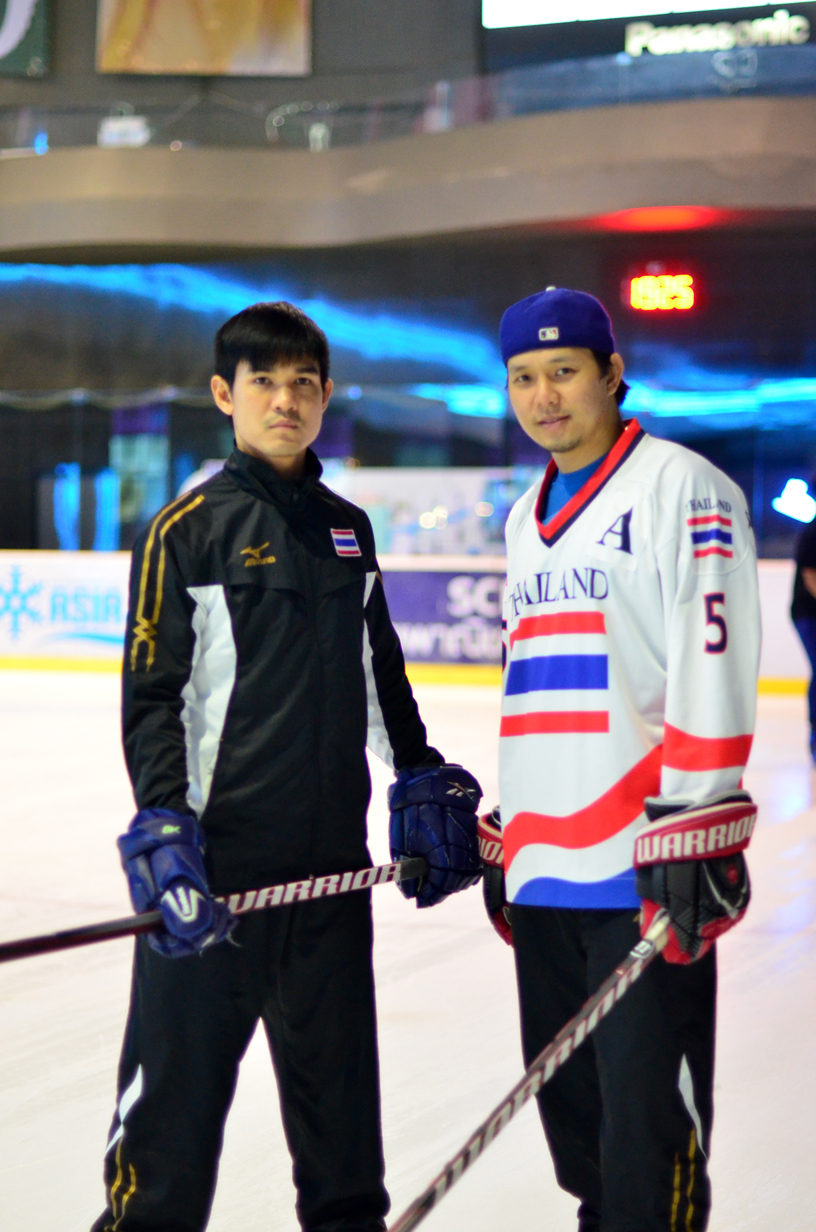
Members of Thailand's 2013 national ice hockey team: Teerasak Rattanachot & Tewin Chartsuwan

The Thailand national ice hockey team is the national men's ice hockey team of Thailand. The team is controlled by the Ice Hockey Association of Thailand and a member of the International Ice Hockey Federation. Thailand is currently ranked at fifty-first in the IIHF World Rankings and have been entered in the World Championship tournaments since 2019 but have not yet participated at any Olympic Games. Currently they sit in 7th place of Asian Ice Hockey Ranking. They have played in the Challenge Cup of Asia, a regional tournament for lower-tier hockey nations in Asia.

The first official hockey league in Thailand, the Bangkok Ice Hockey league (BIHL) was founded in 2014. The majority of the practices and games for the handful of teams in the BIHL are held at the two rinks inside of Central Rama 9 and Imperial World in Samrong, two of Bangkok's popular shopping malls. Currently, most of Thailand's national hockey players are playing on the BIHL with a player as young as 15 years old.

Queen Suthida of Thailand is known as a big ice hockey enthusiast and supporter of Thailand ice hockey team.

== Tournament record ==
=== World Championships ===
- 2019 – 49th place (3rd in Division III, Qualification)
- 2020 – Cancelled due to the coronavirus pandemic
- 2021 – Cancelled due to the COVID-19 pandemic
- 2022 – 43rd place (2nd in Division III, Group B)
- 2023 – 44th place (4th in Division III, Group A)
- 2024 – 41st place (1st in Division III, Group A)
- 2025 – 40th place (6th in Division II, Group B)
- 2026 – 45th place (5th in Division III, Group A)

=== Asian Winter Games ===
Year	Host	Result	Pld	W	D	L	GF	GA	GD
2003	(Japan) Aomori	5th	3	1	0	2	6	65	-59
2007	(China) Changchun	9th	4	2	0	2	11	59	-48
2011	(Kazakhstan) Astana	7th	6	5	0	1	70	22	+48
2017	(Japan) Sapporo	5th	5	5	0	0	35	12	+23
2025	(China) Harbin	6th	6	0	0	6	4	56	-52
Total			24	13	0	11	126	214	-88

=== Challenge Cup of Asia ===
- 2008 Hong Kong – 4th place
- 2009 Abu Dhabi – Runners-up
- 2010 Taipei City – 3rd place
- 2011 Kuwait City – 3rd place
- 2012 Dehradun – Runners-up
- 2013 Bangkok – 5th place
- 2014 Abu Dhabi – 4th place
- 2015 Taipei City – 4th place
- 2016 Abu Dhabi – 4th place
- 2017 Bangkok – 3rd place
- 2018 Pasay – Runners-up

=== Ice hockey at the SEA Games ===
- 2017 Kuala Lumpur – Runners-up
- 2019 Philippines – 1st
- Ice hockey at the 2025 SEA Games – 2nd place

== Team ==
=== Current roster ===
No.	Pos.	Name	Team
1	GK	David Benjamin Kleineschay	(Thailand) Aware
25	GK	James McAlear	(United States) Norwich University
20	GK	Dominik Vollenweiderr	Team Thailand
12	D	Sarawut Danielsson	(Sweden) UU Hockey
5	D	Edvin Ken Kindborn	(Thailand) KCG
14	D	Sarawut Phasookwong	(Norway) Manglerud Star Ishockey
8	D	Punn Phasukkijwatana	Team Thailand
23	D	Satira Tawon Andersson	(Sweden) Solna SK (SWE)
16	D	Araya Vatanapanyakul	(Thailand) Lexicon Lumberjack
22	D	N. Yannakornthanapunt	(Thailand) Magna
28	FW	Kim Aarola	(Finland) Hyvinkään Jää-Ahmat
11	FW	Patrick Forstner	(Thailand) KCG
83	FW	Masato Kitayama	Team Thailand
61	FW	Mikael Jan Isaksson	(Thailand) Aware
10	FW	Athit Khunra	(Thailand) KCG
13	FW	Charles Nichols Lampson	(Thailand) Lexicon Lumberjack
18	FW	Chanokchon Limpinphet	(Thailand) Mandalay
17	FW	Nathaphat Luckanatinakorn	(Thailand) KCG
96	FW	Hideki Nagayama	Team Thailand
15	FW	Thanachai Sakchaicharoenkul	Team Thailand
4	FW	Rakchai Sukwiboon	(Thailand) Ice Breakers
6	FW	Nakrit Sutivijitho	(Thailand) Bangkok Warriors

== All-time record against other nations ==
Updated as of 11 February 2025

Team	GP	W	T	L	GF	GA
Bahrain	1	1	0	0	29	0
Bosnia and Herzegovina	3	3	0	0	17	11
China	2	0	0	2	2	32
Chinese Taipei	13	2	0	11	37	83
Georgia	1	0	0	1	0	10
Hong Kong	9	6	0	3	44	32
India	2	2	0	0	43	0
Indonesia	2	2	0	0	26	0
Japan	3	0	0	3	3	62
Kazakhstan	2	0	0	2	1	64
Kuwait	10	10	0	0	81	16
Kyrgyzstan	3	2	0	1	18	19
Luxembourg	2	2	0	0	16	3
Macau	5	5	0	0	27	6
Malaysia	10	8	1	1	102	22
Mexico	1	1	0	0	5	0
Mongolia	10	4	0	6	37	46
Netherlands	1	0	0	1	1	23
Philippines	3	2	0	1	21	10
Singapore	9	8	0	1	82	4
South Africa	4	3	0	1	18	13
South Korea	1	0	0	1	0	10
Spain	1	0	0	1	2	15
Turkmenistan	2	1	0	1	16	9
United Arab Emirates	13	3	0	10	39	58
Total	113	62	1	50	667	548
