= India men's national ice hockey team =

National team representing India in ice hockey

India
- Association: Ice Hockey Association of India
- General manager: Rajat Malhotra
- Head coach: Darrin Harrold
- Captain: Tsewang Gyaltson
- Most games: Stanzin Namgyal (34)
- Top scorer: Rigzin Norboo (10)
- Most points: Rigzin Norboo (14)
- Team colors
- IIHF code: IND

Ranking
- Current IIHF: NR (3 June 2026)

First international
- Thailand 14–0 India (Abu Dhabi, UAE; 15 March 2009)

Biggest win
- India 5–1 Macau (Dehradun, India; 21 March 2012); India 7–3 Macau (Kuwait City, Kuwait; 25 April 2017)

Biggest defeat
- Kuwait 39–2 India (Kuwait City, Kuwait; 26 April 2011)

Asian Winter Games
- Appearances: 1 (first in 2025)
- Best result: 12th

IIHF Challenge Cup of Asia
- Appearances: 9 (first in 2009)
- Best result: 6th (2011, 2012)

International record (W–L–T)
- 5–40–0

Medal record

IIHF Asia Cup Division I
Silver medal – second place	2017 Kuwait City	

The India national ice hockey team is the national men's ice hockey team of India. They are controlled by the Ice Hockey Association of India and are a member of the International Ice Hockey Federation (IIHF). India has mostly participated in the IIHF Asia and Oceania Championship, a regional tournament for lower-tier ice hockey nations in Asia.

== History ==
=== Background of ice hockey in Ladakh ===
The history of ice hockey in India dates back almost 100 years, when ice hockey was a favourite pastime for the British Raj in Shimla. The Shimla Ice Skating Club is still very active in promoting ice sports in India. In the early 1970s, the Ladakh Scouts, a battalion of the Indian Army posted in the high border regions, took up the game. The high Changthang Plateau's frozen streams and high altitude lakes make the region an ideal place to play ice hockey, and as a result, the game spread amongst the army. The game gained more widespread popularity exhibition matches began taking place in Leh in the winter. With little to do during the region's harsh winters, locals began to play on a small irrigation pond in Karzoo, Leh.

Ice hockey gear was not and is still not available to buy in Ladakh. The few locals who have contacts outside Ladakh have requested friends to get ice hockey skates. The Ladakh Scouts are well equipped as they get their gear through the army. The Jammu & Kashmir department of tourism also had a full set of equipment, but was reluctant to spare any. The only place in India where ice sports equipment is readily available is Shimla, a small hill station in the northwestern part of India, where two Chinese brothers began making skates that are still used today.

Due to the lack of accessible equipment, Ladakhis began to improvise, with the first teams obtaining ice skating blades from Shimla and nailing them to army ammunition boots. Roller skates and ground hockey sticks were also used. To create pucks, locals cut the thick, rubber heels of army boots into a rounded shape. Goalkeepers wore ground hockey pads but lacked helmets; neither helmets nor knee and elbow pads were used by other players. Despite injuries, due to this lack of protective gear, the game has continued to grow in popularity in the region.

=== National team ===
India made its international debut in 2009 at the IIHF Challenge Cup of Asia in Abu Dhabi, United Arab Emirates, finishing eighth and thus last. In their first game, they were shutout by Thailand 14–0. After two more losses, a 10–0 loss to Mongolia and a 10–1 loss to Malaysia, India, bottom of their group with a goal difference of minus 33, in which they again lost both games. First, they lost to Singapore 5–0, and finally lost to Macau 8–0 in the seventh place game. Two years later, they suffered their biggest international defeat to date at 2–39 against Kuwait at the 2011 IIHF Challenge Cup of Asia. On 21 March 2012, the national team notched its first international victory at the 2012 IIHF Challenge Cup of Asia, they defeated Macau 5–1. India has participated in the IIHF Challenge Cup of Asia from 2009 to 2018, with the exception of 2010. From 2014 to 2018, they played in Division I of the IIHF Challenge Cup of Asia. In 2017, India finished second of four teams in Division I tournament (seventh overall). First, they narrowly defeated Oman 3–2, then lost to Kuwait 8–5, and finally won 7–3 over Macau. India participated at the Winter Asian Games in 2025. They lost all the matches except the one against Macau. In the 2024–25 season, the Indian team finished 28th in the AIH ranking of Asian men's national ice hockey teams. India will play in official 2027 IIHF World Championship Division IV for first time ever in its history. India will play with 3 official teams: Men, Women and U20 men.

== Tournament record ==
=== World Championship ===
Year	Host	Result	Pld	W	OTW	OTL	L
1930 through 2026		Did not enter					
2027	(Malaysia) Kuala Lumpur	(Division IV)					
Total							

=== IIHF Development Cup ===
Year	Location	Result
2026	(Morocco)	Did not participate

=== Asian Winter Games ===
Year	Host	Result	Pld	W	OTW	OTL	L	GF	GA	GD
2025	(China) Harbin	12th place	4	1	0	0	3	7	64	-57
Total			4	1	0	0	3	7	64	-57

=== Challenge Cup of Asia ===
Year	Host	Result	Pld	W	OTW	OTL	L	GF	GA	GD
2008	Hong Kong	Did not participate								
2009	(United Arab Emirates) Abu Dhabi	8th place	5	0	0	0	5	1	47	-46
2010	(Chinese Taipei) Taipei City	Did not participate								
2011	Kuwait City	6th place	5	0	0	0	5	2	101	-99
2012	(India) Dehradun	6th place	5	1	0	0	4	14	50	-36
2013	(Thailand) Bangkok	10th place	4	0	0	0	4	5	63	-58
2014	(Kyrgyzstan) Bishkek	10th place (4th in Division I)	5	0	0	0	5	9	45	-36
2015	Kuwait City	11th place (6th in Division I)	5	0	0	0	5	12	54	-42
2016	(Kyrgyzstan) Bishkek	10th place (5th in Division I)	4	0	0	0	4	14	34	-20
2017	Kuwait City	7th place (2nd in Division I)	3	2	0	0	1	15	13	+2
2018	(Malaysia) Kuala Lumpur	9th place (4th in Division I)	5	1	0	0	4	9	22	-13
2019	(Malaysia) Kuala Lumpur	Did not participate								
Total		9/12	41	4	0	0	37	81	429	-348

== Players and personnel ==
=== Team roster ===
For the 2025 Asian Winter Games

#	Name	Pos	S/G	Birthdate
7	Tsewang Gyaltson (C)	D	R	16 November 1992 (age 33)
11	Sajjad Hussain	D	R	22 February 1995 (age 31)
12	Stanzin Lotus	F	R	4 May 2005 (age 21)
16	Tsering Angchuk	D	R	31 December 1997 (age 28)
17	Ghulam Mustafa	D	R	27 August 1997 (age 29)
18	Stanzin Angchok	F	R	8 May 1999 (age 27)
21	Rigzin Norboo	D	R	23 October 1992 (age 33)
24	Stanzin Namgyal	D	R	24 September 1993 (age 33)
34	Stanzin Phandey	G	L	14 July 1987 (age 39)
37	Angchok Lakdan	F	R	10 August 1993 (age 33)
38	Namgail Tundup	G	L	7 April 1992 (age 34)
42	Mohd Ismail	F	R	2 February 1992 (age 34)
44	Mohammad Ali Baba	F	R	13 October 2006 (age 20)
47	Namgail Tashi	F	R	10 March 1996 (age 30)
68	Angchok Dorjay	F	R	20 December 1989 (age 36)
72	Chamba Tsetan (A)	F	R	30 January 1994 (age 32)
77	Jigmath Kunzan	F	R	8 April 1991 (age 35)
83	Lotus Chamba	G	L	25 September 1996 (age 30)
87	Namgyal Deldan	F	R	24 June 1999 (age 27)
88	Tsewang Dorjay	F	R	29 December 1997 (age 28)
94	Nawang Zangpo (A)	D	L	5 April 1994 (age 32)
95	Namgyal Deskyong	D	R	8 January 1993 (age 33)
97	Tsering Angdus	F	R	26 March 1997 (age 29)

=== Team staff ===
For the Ice hockey at the 2025 Asian Winter Games

- Head coach: (Canada) Darrin Harrold
- Assistant coach: (India) Amit Belwal
- Assistant coach: (India) Abdul Hakim
- General manager: (India) Rajat Malhotra
- Team leader: (India) Noor Jahan
- Doctor: (India) Sarthak Patnaik
- Physiotherapist: (India) Shantanu Mahajan
- Team staff: (India) Bharat Singh

== All-time record against other nations ==
As of 10 February 2025

Key
Positive balance (more wins)
Neutral balance (wins = losses)
Negative balance (more losses)

Team	GP	W	T	L	GF	GA
Hong Kong	3	0	0	3	0	66
Indonesia	2	0	0	2	3	8
Kuwait	4	0	0	4	11	70
Kyrgyzstan	4	0	0	4	6	44
Macau	11	4	0	7	31	49
Malaysia	6	0	0	6	15	78
Mongolia	2	0	0	2	0	30
Oman	2	1	0	1	8	8
Qatar	1	0	0	1	2	5
Singapore	6	0	0	6	11	55
Thailand	2	0	0	2	0	43
Turkmenistan	1	0	0	1	1	19
United Arab Emirates	1	0	0	1	1	19
Total	45	5	0	40	88	493

== See also ==
- India men's national junior ice hockey team
- India men's national under-18 ice hockey team
- Indian Ice Hockey Championship
