= Hong Kong men's national ice hockey team =

Hong Kong
- Association: Hong Kong Ice Hockey Association
- General manager: Yannick Wong
- Head coach: Michael Beharrell
- Assistants: Jeff Compton; Robert Kang; Ivano Zanatta
- Captain: Tony Leung
- Most games: Yannick Wong (66)
- Top scorer: Justin Cheng (52)
- Most points: Justin Cheng (97)
- Team colors
- IIHF code: HKG

Ranking
- Current IIHF: NR (3 June 2026)
- Highest IIHF: 44 (2016–17)
- Lowest IIHF: 49 (2024)

First international
- Hong Kong 2–2 Chinese Taipei (Perth, Australia; 3 March 1987)

Biggest win
- Hong Kong 30–0 India (Harbin, China; 5 February 2025)

Biggest defeat
- South Korea 44–0 Hong Kong (Perth, Australia; 14 March 1987)

IIHF World Championships
- Appearances: 11 (first in 1987)
- Best result: 28th (1987)

Asian Winter Games
- Appearances: 2 (first in 2007)
- Best result: 9th (2017)

IIHF Challenge Cup of Asia
- Appearances: 6 (first in 2008)
- Best result: (2011)

International record (W–L–T)
- 59–59–6

Hong Kong men's national ice hockey team
- Traditional Chinese: 香港國家冰球隊
- Simplified Chinese: 香港国家冰球队
Transcriptions
Standard Mandarin
- Hanyu Pinyin: Xiānggǎng Guójiā Bīngqiú Duì

The Hong Kong national ice hockey team is the national men's ice hockey team of Hong Kong and a member of the International Ice Hockey Federation (IIHF). Hong Kong currently competes in Division III of the IIHF World Championships. As of December 2025, Hong Kong is ranked 48th in the IIHF World Ranking and 13th in the Asian Ranking.

== History ==
The Hong Kong Ice Hockey Association (HKIHA) was founded on 8 August 1980. Hong Kong joined the IIHF on 31 March 1983, and made its debut in the world championship at Pool D in Perth, Australia in 1987. Hong Kong tied Chinese Taipei, 2–2 in its first international game on 13 March 1987 and went on to win the Fair Play Cup at the world tournament. After their one appearance in the World Championship, Hong Kong took a hiatus from participation in international tournaments.

Although there was plenty of ice hockey activity in Hong Kong, local teams (usually stocked with Canadian and American players) did not compete for the national championship until 1995–96. The first title was won by a team sponsored by Planet Hollywood.

In 2014, Hong Kong returned to the World Championships, and participated in the Division III level, the sixth and lowest tier. Since then they have participated every year at the Division III level, with their highest finish being fourth in the tournament twice (44th overall).

== Tournament record ==
=== World Championships ===
Year	Host	Result	Pld	W	OW	OL	L
1987	(Australia) Perth	28th place (4th in Pool D)	6	0	0	0	6
1988 through 2013		did not participate	–	–	–	–	–
2014	(Luxembourg) Kockelscheuer	44th place (4th in Division III)	5	1	1	0	3
2015	(Turkey) İzmir	44th place (4th in Division III)	6	3	0	0	3
2016	(Turkey) Istanbul	45th place (5th in Division III)	5	1	0	0	4
2017	(Bulgaria) Sofia	44th place (4th in Division III)	4	1	0	0	3
2018	(South Africa) Cape Town	46th place 6th in (Division III)	5	0	0	0	5
2019	(United Arab Emirates) Abu Dhabi	48th place 2nd in (Division IIIQ)	5	4	0	0	1
2020	(South Africa) Cape Town	Cancelled due to the COVID-19 pandemic					
2021	(South Africa) Cape Town	Cancelled due to the COVID-19 pandemic					
2022	(South Africa) Cape Town	Withdrawn due to the COVID-19 pandemic					
2023	(Bosnia and Herzegovina) Sarajevo	48th place 3rd in (Division III B)	5	2	1	1	1
2024	(Bosnia and Herzegovina) Sarajevo	49th place 3rd in (Division III B)	5	3	1	0	1
2025	(Mexico) Queretaro	49th place (3rd in Division III B)	5	3	0	0	2
2026	Hong Kong	49th place 3rd in (Division III B)	5	3	0	0	2

=== Asian Winter Games ===
Year	Host	Result	Pld	W	OW	OL	L
2007	(China) Changchun	10th place	3	0	0	0	3
2011	(Kazakhstan) Astana	Did not participate					
2017	(Japan) Sapporo	9th place (5th in Division I)	5	1	0	1	3
2025	(China) Harbin	8th place (1st in Group C)	5	3	0	1	1

=== Challenge Cup of Asia ===
Year	Host	Result	Pld	W	OW	OL	L
2008	Hong Kong	3rd place	5	3	–	–	2
2009	(United Arab Emirates) Abu Dhabi	4th place	5	1	–	1*	3
2010	(Chinese Taipei) Taipei City	5th place	5	3	–	1*	1
2011	Kuwait City	1st place	5	5	0	0	0
2012	(India) Dehradun	Did not participate					
2013	(Thailand) Bangkok	2nd place	7	6	0	0	1
2014	(United Arab Emirates) Abu Dhabi	5th place	5	1	0	1	3

== All-time record against other nations ==
As of 11 February 2025

Team	GP	W	T	L	GF	GA
Australia	2	0	0	2	0	79
Bosnia and Herzegovina	6	4	0	2	33	13
Bulgaria	3	0	0	3	4	26
Chinese Taipei	10	3	1	6	29	38
Georgia	5	3	0	2	32	28
India	3	3	0	0	66	0
Iran	2	2	0	0	22	4
Kazakhstan	1	0	0	1	0	24
Kyrgyzstan	3	1	0	2	12	18
Kuwait	4	4	0	0	36	3
Luxembourg	4	0	0	4	4	28
Macau	22	14	3	5	167	58
Malaysia	4	1	0	3	24	15
Mongolia	6	4	0	2	26	26
New Zealand	2	0	0	2	0	38
North Korea	3	0	0	3	10	31
Philippines	1	1	0	0	9	5
Singapore	6	5	1	0	39	11
South Africa	2	0	0	2	1	15
South Korea	3	0	0	3	1	79
Thailand	9	3	0	6	32	44
Turkey	3	0	0	3	3	21
Turkmenistan	1	1	0	0	5	1
United Arab Emirates	9	4	1	4	27	37
Total	114	53	6	55	562	643
