= 2016 IIHF Challenge Cup of Asia – Division I =

2016 IIHF Challenge Cup of Asia - Division 1
Tournament details
- Host country: Kyrgyzstan
- Venue(s): 1 (in 1 host city)
- Dates: 9 – 14 April 2016
- Teams: 5

Final positions
- Champions: Kyrgyzstan (1st title)
- Runner-up: Malaysia
- Third place: Macau

Tournament statistics
- Games played: 10
- Goals scored: 96 (9.6 per game)
- Attendance: 3,445 (345 per game)

Awards
- MVP: (Kyrgyzstan) Oleg Kolodii

The 2016 IIHF Challenge Cup of Asia Division I was the third IIHF Challenge Cup of Asia Division I competition, an annual international ice hockey tournament held by the International Ice Hockey Federation (IIHF). It took place between 9 and 14 April 2016 in Bishkek, Kyrgyzstan.

== Participants ==
Team	2015 Results
India	6th in Division I in 2015
Kyrgyzstan	Host, 3rd in Division I in 2015
Macau	Relegated from Top Division in 2015
Malaysia	5th in Division I in 2015
Qatar	Did not participate in 2015

=== Preliminary round ===
Pos	Team	Pld	W	OTW	OTL	L	GF	GA	GD	Pts	Promotion
1st place, gold medalist(s)	Kyrgyzstan	4	4	0	0	0	37	7	+30	12	Promoted to Top Division 2017
2nd place, silver medalist(s)	Malaysia	4	3	0	0	1	25	16	+9	9	Promoted to Top Division 2017
3rd place, bronze medalist(s)	Macau	4	1	1	0	2	13	21	−8	5	
4	Qatar	4	1	0	0	3	7	18	−11	3	
5	India	4	0	0	1	3	14	34	−20	1	

Source: IIHF

=== Results ===
1 SAT 9 APR 15:30 GMT QAT - MAS 1 - 3

2 SAT 9 APR 19:00 GMT IND - KGZ 1 - 11

3 SUN 10 APR 15:30 GMT MAC - IND 7 - 6

4 SUN 10 APR 19:00 GMT KGZ - QAT 9 - 0

5 MON 11 APR 15:30 GMT MAC - QAT 4 - 1

6 MON 11 APR 19:00 GMT KGZ - MAS 9 - 5

7 WED 13 APR 15:30 GMT MAS - MAC 6 - 1

8 WED 13 APR 19:00 GMT IND - QAT 2 - 5

9 THU 14 APR 15:30 GMT MAS - IND 11 - 5

10 THU 14 APR 19:00 GMT MAC - KGZ 1 - 8

== Awards and statistics ==
=== Awards ===
- Media All-Stars:
  - MVP: (Kyrgyzstan) Oleg Kolodii
  - Goalkeeper: (Macau) Te Lin Chu
  - Defenceman: (India) Ali Amir
  - Forward: (Malaysia) Ban Kin Loke

=== Scoring Leaders ===
Player	GP	G	A	Pts	+/−	PIM
(Kyrgyzstan) Oleg Kolodii	4	15	5	20	+25	6
(Malaysia) Ban Kin Loke	4	9	9	18	+8	4
(Malaysia) Bryan Chee Ming Lim	4	5	7	12	+6	4
(Malaysia) Nural Nizam Versluis	4	6	5	11	+8	0
(Kyrgyzstan) Mishigsuren Namjil	4	3	7	10	+16	2

GP = Games played; G = Goals; A = Assists; Pts = Points; +/− = Plus/minus; PIM = Penalties in minutes

Source: IIHF.com

=== Goaltending leaders ===
Only the top five goaltenders, based on save percentage, who have played at least 40% of their team's minutes, are included in this list.

Player	TOI	GA	GAA	SA	Sv%	SO
(Kyrgyzstan) Elzar Bolotbekov	128:08	2	0.94	37	94.59	1
(Malaysia) Tengku Azlly Tengku Abdillah	214:56	11	3.07	109	89.91	0
(Qatar) Ahmad Alsulaiti	240:00	18	4.50	109	83.49	0
(Macau) Te Lin Chu	180.26	14	4.66	79	82.28	0
(Kyrgyzstan) Rinat Mustafaev	111:52	5	2.68	24	79.17	0

TOI = Time on ice (minutes:seconds); SA = Shots against; GA = Goals against; GAA = Goals against average; Sv% = Save percentage; SO = Shutouts

Source: IIHF.com
