= 2011 IIHF Challenge Cup of Asia =

Tournament details
- Host country: Kuwait
- Dates: April 25–30, 2011
- Teams: 6

Final positions
- Champions: Hong Kong (1st title)
- Runner-up: United Arab Emirates
- Third place: Thailand

Tournament statistics
- Games played: 15
- Goals scored: 194 (12.93 per game)

Awards
- MVP: (Hong Kong) Jasper Tang

The 2011 IIHF Challenge Cup of Asia was the 4th IIHF Challenge Cup of Asia, an annual international ice hockey tournament held by the International Ice Hockey Federation (IIHF). It took place between April 25 and April 30, 2011 in Kuwait City, Kuwait. Last years winner, Chinese Taipei did not field a team to defend their title. The tournament was won by Hong Kong, who claimed their first title after winning all five of their games.

== Overview ==
The 2011 IIHF Challenge Cup of Asia began on April 25, 2011 in Kuwait City, Kuwait. The first game was played between Thailand and India with Thailand winning the game 29–0. Hong Kong won the tournament winning all five games against the opposing nations, claiming their first title. Hong Kong had previously won bronze at 2008 IIHF Challenge Cup of Asia, which had been their best result to date. The United Arab Emirates finished second, losing only to Hong Kong in their five games and Thailand finished third after losing to Hong Kong and the United Arab Emirates. Hosts, Kuwait, finished fourth with wins over Macau and India. The game between Kuwait and India finished 39–2. It was recorded as Kuwait's largest win in international ice hockey as well as India's first time they had scored multiple goals in a game. India has previously only managed to score one goal in a game against Malaysia at the 2009 IIHF Challenge Cup of Asia.

== Standings ==
Pos	Team	Pld	W	OTW	OTL	L	GF	GA	GD	Pts
1st place, gold medalist(s)	Hong Kong	5	5	0	0	0	46	10	+36	15
2nd place, silver medalist(s)	United Arab Emirates	5	4	0	0	1	30	8	+22	12
3rd place, bronze medalist(s)	Thailand	5	3	0	0	2	51	19	+32	9
4	Kuwait	5	2	0	0	3	51	19	+32	6
5	Macau	5	1	0	0	4	14	37	−23	3
6	India	5	0	0	0	5	2	101	−99	0

== Fixtures ==
All times local.

April 25, 2011; 12:00	Thailand	29 – 0	India

Game reference

April 25, 2011; 15:30	Hong Kong	5 – 4	United Arab Emirates

Game reference

April 25, 2011; 20:30	Kuwait	8 – 3	Macau

Game reference

April 26, 2011; 13:00	United Arab Emirates	8 – 0	Macau

Game reference

April 26, 2011; 16:30	Thailand	5 – 7	Hong Kong

Game reference

April 26, 2011; 20:00	India	2 – 39	Kuwait

Game reference

April 27, 2011; 13:00	Hong Kong	15 – 0	India

Game reference

April 27, 2011; 16:30	Thailand	8 – 3	Macau

Game reference

April 27, 2011; 20:00	United Arab Emirates	2 – 0	Kuwait

Game reference

April 29, 2011; 13:00	Macau	0 – 13	Hong Kong

Game reference

April 29, 2011; 16:30	India	0 – 10	United Arab Emirates

Game reference

April 29, 2011; 20:00	Kuwait	3 – 6	Thailand

Game reference

April 30, 2011; 12:00	Macau	8 – 0	India

Game reference

April 30, 2011; 15:30	Hong Kong	6 – 1	Kuwait

Game reference

April 30, 2011; 19:00	United Arab Emirates	6 – 3	Thailand

Game reference

== Tournament awards ==
- Best players selected by the directorate:
  - Best Goaltender: (Hong Kong) King Chi Ho
  - Best Defenceman: (Thailand) Likit Neimwan
  - Best Forward: (United Arab Emirates) Juma Al Dhaheri
  - Most Valuable Player: (Hong Kong) Jasper Tang
  - Best Coach: (Macau) Dong Yan
