= 2017 IIHF Challenge Cup of Asia =

Tournament details
- Host country: Thailand
- Venue(s): 1 (in 1 host city)
- Dates: 17–23 March 2017
- Teams: 5

Final positions
- Champions: United Arab Emirates (3rd title)
- Runner-up: Mongolia
- Third place: Thailand

Tournament statistics
- Games played: 10
- Goals scored: 112 (11.2 per game)
- Attendance: 1,468 (147 per game)
- Scoring leader(s): (United Arab Emirates) Juma Al Dhaheri (14 points)

The 2017 IIHF Challenge Cup of Asia was the 10th edition of the IIHF Challenge Cup of Asia, an annual international ice hockey tournament held by the International Ice Hockey Federation (IIHF). It took place from 17 to 23 March 2017 at the ice skating rink of the CentralPlaza Grand Rama IX shopping mall in Bangkok, Thailand. Five nations participated, though a sixth, Kyrgyzstan, was supposed to but cancelled. The United Arab Emirates won the tournament, their third time doing so.

== Top Division ==
Participants
Team	2016 Results
Thailand	Host, finished 4th place last year.
United Arab Emirates	Won silver medal last year.
Mongolia	Won bronze medal last year.
Singapore	Finished 5th place last year.
Malaysia	Runner-up of Division I last year and were promoted.

=== Standings ===
Pos	Team	Pld	W	OTW	OTL	L	GF	GA	GD	Pts	Result
1st place, gold medalist(s)	United Arab Emirates	4	3	1	0	0	29	10	+19	11	Gold medal
2nd place, silver medalist(s)	Mongolia	4	3	0	1	0	32	14	+18	10	Silver medal
3rd place, bronze medalist(s)	Thailand	4	2	0	0	2	33	10	+23	6	Bronze medal
4	Singapore	4	1	0	0	3	5	39	−34	3	
5	Malaysia	4	0	0	0	4	13	39	−26	0	Relegated to Division I 2018

Source: IIHF

=== Schedules ===
(UTC+07:00)

17 March 2017; 14:30	Singapore	0–13 (0–2, 0–5, 0–6)	Mongolia	The Rink Ice Arena, Bangkok

Game reference

17 March 2017; 18:00	Malaysia	3–10 (1–2, 1–2, 1–6)	United Arab Emirates	The Rink Ice Arena, Bangkok

Game reference

18 March 2017; 14:30	United Arab Emirates	10–0 (5–0, 3–0, 2–0)	Singapore	The Rink Ice Arena, Bangkok

Game reference

18 March 2017; 18:00	Thailand	14–1 (3–0, 8–1, 3–0)	Malaysia	The Rink Ice Arena, Bangkok

Game reference

20 March 2017; 14:30	Malaysia	4–5 (1–1, 1–2, 2–2)	Singapore	The Rink Ice Arena, Bangkok

Game reference

20 March 2017; 18:00	Mongolia	5–4 (3–1, 0–2, 2–1)	Thailand	The Rink Ice Arena, Bangkok

Game reference

21 March 2017; 14:30	Mongolia	10–5 (4–2, 4–1, 2–2)	Malaysia	The Rink Ice Arena, Bangkok

Game reference

21 March 2017; 18:00	Thailand	3–4 (0–2, 3–1, 0–1)	United Arab Emirates	The Rink Ice Arena, Bangkok

Game reference

23 March 2017; 14:30	United Arab Emirates	5 – 4 (GWS) (1–2, 2–2, 1–0, 0–0, 1–0)	Mongolia	The Rink Ice Arena, Bangkok

Game reference

23 March 2017; 18:00	Thailand	12–0 (4–0, 6–0, 2–0)	Singapore	The Rink Ice Arena, Bangkok

Game reference

== Awards and statistics ==
=== Awards ===
- Best players selected by the directorate:
  - Best Goaltender: (United Arab Emirates) Khaled Al Suwaidi
  - Best Defenceman: (Mongolia) Boldbayar Bayajikh
  - Best Forward: (United Arab Emirates) Juma Al Dhaheri

Source: IIHF.com

=== Scoring leaders ===
Player	GP	G	A	Pts	+/–	PIM	POS
(United Arab Emirates) Juma Al Dhaheri	4	8	6	14	+7	2	F
(Mongolia) Erdenesukh Bold	4	5	7	12	+13	4	F
(United Arab Emirates) Khalifa Al Mahrooqi	4	6	5	11	+5	4	F
(Mongolia) Gerelt Ider	4	5	5	10	+9	8	F
(Thailand) Tewin Chartsuwan	4	4	5	9	+11	2	F
(Mongolia) Jargalsaikhan Bayarsaikhan	4	3	6	9	+8	4	F
(Thailand) Likit Neimwan	4	3	6	9	+13	0	D
(Mongolia) Boldbayar Bayajikh	4	2	7	9	+15	2	D
(Malaysia) Chee Ming Bryan Lim	4	7	1	8	−10	4	F
(Thailand) Hideki Nagayama	4	3	5	8	+7	2	F

Source: IIHF.com

=== Goaltending leaders ===
Only the top five goaltenders, based on save percentage, who have played at least 40% of their team's minutes, are included in this list.

Player	TOI	GA	GAA	SA	SV%	SO
(Thailand) Prakpoom Thongaram	108:35	5	2.76	52	91.23	0
(Thailand) Pattarapol Ungkulpattanasuk	130:24	5	2.30	50	90.91	0
(United Arab Emirates) Khaled Al Suwaidi	185:00	10	3.24	90	90.00	0
(Mongolia) Munkhbold Bayarsaikhan	175:28	11	3.76	88	88.89	0
(Malaysia) Thien Ian Lee	139:25	18	7.75	88	83.02	0

Source: IIHF.com

== Division I ==
2017 IIHF Challenge Cup of Asia Division I
Tournament details
- Host country: Kuwait
- Venue(s): 1 (in 1 host city)
- Dates: 22–25 April 2017
- Teams: 4

Final positions
- Champions: Kuwait (2nd title)

Tournament statistics
- Games played: 6
- Goals scored: 104 (17.33 per game)
- Attendance: 1,048 (175 per game)
- Scoring leader(s): (Kuwait) Ahmad Al Ajmi (17 points)

The Division I competition was played between 22 and 25 April 2017 in Kuwait City, Kuwait.

Participants
Team	2016 Results
Kuwait	Host, did not participate last year. Last participation in 2015.
Macau	Finished 3rd place in Division I last year.
India	Finished 5th place in Division I last year.
Oman	Did not participate last year. First participation since 2015.

=== Standings ===
Pos	Team	Pld	W	OTW	OTL	L	GF	GA	GD	Pts	Promotion
1	Kuwait	3	3	0	0	0	29	5	+24	9	Promoted to Top Division 2018
2	India	3	2	0	0	1	15	13	+2	6	
3	Oman	3	1	0	0	2	4	17	−13	3	
4	Macau	3	0	0	0	3	4	17	−13	0	
