= 2009 IIHF Challenge Cup of Asia =

Tournament details
- Host country: United Arab Emirates
- Dates: March 15 – March 20
- Teams: 8

Final positions
- Champions: United Arab Emirates (1st title)
- Runner-up: Thailand
- Third place: Malaysia

Tournament statistics
- Games played: 20

The 2009 IIHF Challenge Cup of Asia took place in Abu Dhabi, United Arab Emirates from 15 March to 20 March. It was the second annual event, and was run by the International Ice Hockey Federation (IIHF). United Arab Emirates won the championship, winning all five of its games and defeating Thailand in the final 5–3.

== Group stage ==
Eight participating teams were placed in the following two groups. After playing a round-robin, the teams move to the preliminary round to decide the final ranking.

=== Group A ===
Team	Pld	W	D	L	GF	GA	GD	Pts	Qualification
Thailand	3	3	0	0	27	5	+22	9	Medal playoffs
Malaysia	3	2	0	1	16	11	+5	6	Medal playoffs
Mongolia	3	1	0	2	15	9	+6	3	5th–8th playoffs
India	3	0	0	3	1	34	−33	0	5th–8th playoffs

All times local.

March 15, 2009	Thailand	14 – 0	India

Game reference

March 15, 2009	Malaysia	4 – 2	Mongolia

Game reference

March 16, 2009	India	0 – 10	Mongolia

Game reference

March 16, 2009	Malaysia	2 – 8	Thailand

Game reference

March 17, 2009	Thailand	5 – 3	Mongolia

Game reference

March 17, 2009	Malaysia	10 – 1	India

Game reference

=== Group B ===
Team	Pld	W	D	L	GF	GA	GD	Pts	Qualification
United Arab Emirates	3	3	0	0	16	3	+13	9	Medal playoffs
Hong Kong	3	1	1	1	13	6	+7	4	Medal playoffs
Singapore	3	1	1	1	9	6	+3	4	5th–8th playoffs
Macau	3	0	0	3	1	24	−23	0	5th–8th playoffs

All times local.

March 15, 2009	Hong Kong	1 – 1	Singapore

Game reference

March 15, 2009	United Arab Emirates	7 – 0	Macau

Game reference

March 16, 2009	Macau	0 – 11	Hong Kong

Game reference

March 16, 2009	Singapore	2 – 4	United Arab Emirates

Game reference

March 17, 2009	Singapore	6 – 1	Macau

Game reference

March 17, 2009	Hong Kong	1 – 5	United Arab Emirates

Game reference

== Playoff round ==
=== 5th–8th playoffs ===
==== Bracket ====
Semi-finals
March 19
Singapore	5
India	0
March 19
Mongolia	4
Macau	1

Fifth place
March 20
Singapore	1
Mongolia	5
Seventh place
March 20
India	0
Macau	8

==== Semi-finals ====
March 19, 2009	Singapore	5 – 0	India

Game reference

March 19, 2009	Mongolia	4 – 1	Macau

Game reference

==== Seventh place ====
March 20, 2009	Macau	8 – 0	India

Game reference

==== Fifth place ====
March 20, 2009	Mongolia	5 – 1	Singapore

Game reference

=== Medal playoffs ===
==== Bracket ====
Semi-finals
March 19
Thailand	6
Hong Kong	4
March 19
United Arab Emirates	3
Malaysia	1

Finals
March 20
Thailand	3
United Arab Emirates	5
Third place
March 20
Hong Kong	3
Malaysia	4

==== Semi-finals ====
March 19, 2009	Thailand	6 – 4	Hong Kong

Game reference

March 19, 2009	United Arab Emirates	3 – 1	Malaysia

Game reference

==== Bronze medal game ====
March 20, 2009	Hong Kong	3 – 4	Malaysia

Game reference

==== Gold medal game ====
March 20, 2009	United Arab Emirates	5 – 3	Thailand

Game reference

== Final rankings ==
Rank	Team
1st place, gold medalist(s)	United Arab Emirates
2nd place, silver medalist(s)	Thailand
3rd place, bronze medalist(s)	Malaysia
4th	Hong Kong
5th	Mongolia
6th	Singapore
7th	Macau
8th	India
