= Nawang Dorje =

Nepalese mountaineer and mountain guide

Nawang Dorje Sherpa is a Nepalese mountaineer and mountain guide, best known for the first ascent of Dhaulagiri as a member of Helvetic-Austrian expedition, and many ascents in the mountains of the Himalaya Range.

== Mountaineering ==
- 1960 – Dhaulagiri, with Kurt Diemberger, Peter Diener, Nima Dorje, Ernst Forrer, Albin Schelbert
- 1995 - Cho Oyu, September 29 with Tomonori Harada, Shigeki Imoto, Kunga Sherpa.
- 1996 - Everest, SE Ridge with Pete Schoening, Anatoli Boukreev et al, May 1–13. Death of Scott Fischer.
- 2000 - Everest, May 19, North Col - North Ridge
- 2004 - 3rd ascent to Everest with international expedition through South Col Route
- 2007 - 4th ascent to Everest, with a French expedition.

Its reported that he has also climbed Annapurna IV, Island Peak and Pisang Peak.

== See also ==
- Eight-thousander
