= IIHF World Ranking =

Ranking of national ice hockey teams

Top 20 rankings as of June 2026

Men's
Rank	Change*	Team	Points
1	▲2	Switzerland	5335
2	Steady	Canada	5305
3	▼2	United States	5305
4	▲2	Finland	5240
5	▼1	Sweden	5110
6	▼1	Czech Republic	5090
7	Steady	Germany	4910
8	Steady	Slovakia	4900
9	▲1	Latvia	4845
10	▼1	Denmark	4760
11	▲1	Norway	4755
12	▼1	Austria	4555
13	▲2	Slovenia	4375
14	Steady	Kazakhstan	4370
15	▼2	France	4350
16	▲2	Italy	4295
17	▲2	Hungary	4275
18	▼2	Great Britain	4260
19	▲3	Ukraine	3995
20	▼1	Poland	3965

Women's
Rank	Change*	Team	Points
1	Steady	United States	5460
2	Steady	Canada	5400
3	▲1	Czech Republic	5125
4	▲1	Switzerland	5100
5	▼2	Finland	5090
6	▲1	Sweden	4980
7	▲1	Germany	4840
8	▼1	Japan	4805
9	Steady	Hungary	4545
10	Steady	Denmark	4510
11	▲3	France	4460
12	▼1	Norway	4455
13	Steady	Austria	4400
14	▼2	China	4365
15	▲2	Italy	4245
16	Steady	Netherlands	4210
17	▼2	Slovakia	4190
18	Steady	South Korea	3960
19	Steady	Great Britain	3910
20	Steady	Poland	3875

The IIHF World Ranking is a ranking of the performance of the national ice hockey teams of member countries of the International Ice Hockey Federation (IIHF). It is based on a formula giving points for each team's placings at IIHF-sanctioned tournaments over the previous four years. The ranking is used to determine seedings and qualification requirements for future IIHF tournaments. Russia's men team has more points overall in the men's rankings but is excluded from the list due to its ongoing suspension from IIHF competition.

== Description ==
The system was approved at the IIHF congress of September 2003. According to former IIHF President René Fasel, the system was designed to be simple to understand and "reflect the long-term quality of all national hockey programs and their commitment to international hockey".

The ranking is used to determine the seeding of the teams for the next World Championship and to select the teams which can participate in Winter Olympics without playing in the qualifying round. For example, for the 2022 Winter Olympics, the first eight teams of the Men's World Ranking and the first six of the Women's World Ranking were pre-qualified. Qualification for the men's tournament at the 2022 Winter Olympics was structured around the 2019 ranking. Twelve spots were made available for teams. The top eight teams in the World Ranking after the 2019 Men's World Ice Hockey Championships received automatic berths into the Ice Hockey event. All IIHF teams had an opportunity to qualify for the event. Teams that wished to participate ranked below 36th played in two preliminary qualifications in November 2019. The two winners of the first preliminaries and teams ranked 27–36th were divided in three groups to play in the second pre-qualification round in December 2019. The three winners of those preliminaries joined teams ranked 18–26th for the third pre-qualification round of three groups in February 2020. The winner of each of these pre-qualification groups and teams ranked 9–17 were divided in three groups to play in the final qualification in August 2021. The winner of each group then joined the eight top-ranked teams plus the host in the Olympics in 2022.

The women's tournament uses a similar qualification format. The top six teams in the IIHF Women's World Ranking after the 2020 IIHF Women's World Championship received automatic berths into the ice hockey event. Lower ranked teams had an opportunity to qualify for the event. Teams ranked 16th and below were divided into three groups where they played in a preliminary qualification round in the October 2021. The three group winners from the round advanced to the final qualification round, where the teams ranked seventh through fifteenth joined them.

=== Formula ===
The world ranking is based on the final positions of the last four Men's or Women's IIHF World Championships and last Olympic ice hockey tournament. Points are assigned according to a team's final placement in the World Championship or the Olympic tournament. The world champion receives 1600 points and then a 20-point interval is used between teams. However, a 40-point interval is used between gold and silver, silver and bronze, fourth and fifth, and eighth and ninth. This is used as a bonus for the teams who reach the quarter-finals, the semi-finals, the final and for winning the gold medal. Prior to 2023, the world champion received 1200 points, with other teams receiving the same point interval decreases.

Place	1	2	3	4	5	6	7	8	9	10	11	12	13	14	15	16	17	18	19	20	...
Points	1600	1560	1520	1500	1460	1440	1420	1400	1360	1340	1320	1300	1280	1260	1240	1220	1200	1180	1160	1140	...

Points awarded in the current year are valued at the full amount. Points award in the prior years decline linearly by 25% until the fifth year when they are dropped from the calculation. Under this formula, any year with a World Championship and an Olympics will be counted twice in the tables (Note: From April 2014 to August 2022, Women's rankings counted Olympics points twice, to be on same formula as Men's rankings, as no Women's top division World Championship was held in Olympic years. This changed with the Women's top division starting to be held in Olympic years in 2022.), for a maximum ranking (gold medal in all five events) of: 5600 points at the completion of an Olympic year, 5200 points at the completion of the following year, 4800 points the next year, and 4400 points in the year before the next Olympics. For example, if after the 2026 Championship a team had won the gold medal in the last four championships and the last Olympic tournament, their score would be 5600: (Note: Due to the point value change from 2023, tournaments from 2020-2022 will still use the 1200 point values in the formula.)

Competition	Valuation coefficient	Points
2026 IIHF World Championship	100%	1600
2026 Winter Olympics	100%	1600
2025 IIHF World Championship	75%	1200
2024 IIHF World Championship	50%	800
2023 IIHF World Championship	25%	400
~~2022 IIHF World Championship~~	~~0%~~	~~0~~
~~2022 Winter Olympics~~	~~0%~~	~~0~~
Counts five tournaments from four latest years		5600

== Men's rankings ==
IIHF World Men's Ranking Leaders

Canada (4,522 days)
Sweden (1,540 days)
Russia (1,386 days)
Finland (462 days)
United States (373 days)
**Switzerland (167 days)**

Current holder shown in **bold**

The current men's ranking (as of June 2026) is based on the performance at the World Championships of 2026, 2025, 2024, and 2023, and at the Olympic ice hockey tournament of 2026. In the upcoming May 2027 rankings, points from the 2027 Men's Ice Hockey World Championships will be added and points from the 2023 World Championship will be dropped.

Russia and Belarus were expelled from competing in all World Championships since 2022 because of their invasion of Ukraine. They were, however, granted the points of the positions they would have been seeded based on their 2021 ranking: in 2022, Russia in third place received 1120 points, and Belarus in 14th place received 860 points. Several nations withdrew from the 2022 World Championships over COVID-19 concerns. These nations similarly received the points of the positions they would have been seeded within their respective tournaments: Australia as second place in IIA received 560 points, New Zealand as third place in IIB received 440 points, North Korea as first place in IIIA received 360 points, Hong Kong as second place in IIIB received 220 points, and the Philippines as fourth place in IV received 100 points.

The following table lists the full breakdown of ranking following the 2026 Men's Ice Hockey World Championships. Scores in italics represent minimum possible scores for unfinished tournaments. All tournament's points have their full value displayed, while the ranking is calculated by adding the current year's tournament points to the depreciated previous three years' tournament points as explained above. The depreciated percentages are shown in the column headings, first for the current total, then for the new total. The "Total" columns are the sums of the current tournament points and the depreciated values for past tournaments. The "+/–" columns indicate the increase or decrease in ranking since the last tournament. A dash in a tournament column indicates that the country did not participate.

Jun 2026 Rank	Feb 2026 Rank	Team	WC division (as of 2027)	WC2026 (—) (100%)	OLY2026 (100%) (100%)	WC2025 (100%) (75%)	WC2024 (75%) (50%)	WC2023 (50%) (25%)	WC2022 (25%) (0%)	June 2026 Total	+/−	Feb 2026 Total	+/−
NR	NR	Russia	Expelled	1600	1600	1560	1520	1520	1120	**5510**	Steady	**5340**	Steady
1	3	Switzerland	Championship	1560	1460	1560	1560	1460	1060	**5335**	▲2	**5185**	▼1
2	2	Canada	Championship	1500	1560	1460	1500	1600	1160	**5305**	Steady	**5235**	▲1
3	1	United States	Championship	1400	1600	1600	1460	1500	1100	**5305**	▼2	**5320**	Steady
4	6	Finland	Championship	1600	1520	1420	1400	1420	1200	**5240**	▲2	**5040**	Steady
5	4	Sweden	Championship	1420	1420	1520	1520	1440	1040	**5100**	▼1	**5060**	Steady
6	5	Czechia	Championship	1460	1400	1440	1600	1400	1120	**5090**	▼1	**5020**	Steady
7	7	Germany	Championship	1340	1440	1360	1440	1560	1020	**4910**	Steady	**4915**	Steady
8	8	Slovakia	Championship	1360	1500	1320	1420	1360	1000	**4900**	Steady	**4815**	▲1
9	10	Latvia	Championship	1440	1340	1340	1360	1520	940	**4845**	▲1	**4695**	Steady
10	9	Denmark	Championship	1300	1360	1500	1280	1340	960	**4760**	▼1	**4730**	▼1
11	12	Norway	Championship	1520	1280	1300	1320	1280	880	**4755**	▲1	**4430**	Steady
12	11	Austria	Championship	1320	1200	1400	1340	1260	920	**4555**	▼1	**4465**	Steady
13	15	Slovenia	Championship	1280	1240	1280	1180	1220	800	**4375**	▲2	**4215**	Steady
14	14	Kazakhstan	Championship	1200	1260	1240	1300	1320	860	**4370**	Steady	**4350**	▼1
15	13	France	Division I A	1160	1320	1220	1260	1300	900	**4350**	▼1	**4360**	▲1
16	18	Italy	Division I A	1240	1300	1180	1160	1160	840	**4295**	▲1	**4140**	▲1
17	19	Hungary	Championship	1260	1160	1260	1200	1240	780	**4275**	▲1	**4135**	▼2
NR	NR	Belarus	Expelled	1200	1220	1220	1240	1260	860	**4270**	Steady	**4215**	Steady
18	16	Great Britain	Division I A	1220	1220	1200	1240	1200	820	**4260**	▼2	**4155**	▲1
19	22	Ukraine	Championship	1180	1140	1160	1080	1060	660	**3995**	▲3	**3805**	Steady
20	19	Poland	Division I A	1140	1080	1120	1220	1180	700	**3965**	▼1	**3880**	Steady
21	20	Japan	Division I B	1100	1180	1140	1120	1080	680	**3965**	▼1	**3870**	Steady
22	21	Romania	Division I B	1040	1120	1100	1140	1120	720	**3835**	▼1	**3815**	Steady
23	24	Lithuania	Division I A	1120	1060	1080	1060	1100	760	**3795**	▲1	**3675**	Steady
24	23	South Korea	Division I B	1020	1100	1060	1100	1140	740	**3750**	▼1	**3740**	Steady
25	25	Estonia	Division I A	1080	1020	1040	1040	1020	640	**3655**	Steady	**3510**	▲1
26	26	China	Division I B	1060	1040	1020	1020	1040	600	**3635**	Steady	**3495**	▼1
27	27	Spain	Division I B	1000	1000	1000	1000	960	540	**3490**	Steady	**3365**	Steady
28	28	Netherlands	Division I B	980	960	960	980	1000	580	**3400**	Steady	**3300**	Steady
29	30	Croatia	Division II A	960	940	980	960	940	560	**3350**	▲1	**3250**	▼1
30	29	Serbia	Division II A	940	980	940	940	980	620	**3340**	▼1	**3270**	▲1
31	31	Iceland	Division II B	800	920	820	860	880	480	**2985**	Steady	**2945**	▲2
32	36	Georgia	Division II A	860	900	840	800	0 (Note: Georgia's result in 2023 was invalidated by the IIHF.)	460	**2790**	▲4	**2455**	▲8
33	32	Bulgaria	Division II B	780	820	780	780	800	420	**2775**	▼1	**2690**	▲3
34	33	Chinese Taipei	Division III A	740	880	760	760	720	300	**2750**	▼1	**2645**	▲4
35	34	Turkey	Division II B	720	840	680	740	760	340	**2630**	▼1	**2540**	▲4
36	35	Thailand	Division III A	640	800	740	720	660	220	**2520**	▼1	**2465**	▲4
37	37	South Africa	Division III A	660	860	660	640	680	240	**2505**	▼1	**2400**	▲8
38	39	United Arab Emirates	Division II A	920	—	920	920	840	360	**2280**	▲1	**2900**	Steady
39	38	Australia	Division II A	880	—	880	880	920	560	**2210**	▼1	**2140**	▼7
40	41	Belgium	Division II A	900	—	900	840	820	440	**2200**	▲1	**2050**	▼9
41	40	Israel	Division II B	840	—	860	900	900	520	**2160**	▼1	**2115**	▼11
42	42	New Zealand	Division II B	820	—	800	820	780	440	**2025**	Steady	**1915**	▼8
43	44	Kyrgyzstan	Division II B	760	—	720	700	600	160	**1800**	▲1	**2345**	▲2
44	43	Turkmenistan	Division III B	620	—	700	660	700	320	**1650**	▼1	**1625**	▼6
45	46	Mexico	Division III A	700	—	600	620	740	400	**1645**	▲1	**1535**	▼6
46	47	Bosnia and Herzegovina	Division III A	680	—	640	600	580	200	**1605**	▲1	**2150**	▲7
47	46	Luxembourg	Division III B	540	—	620	680	640	280	**1505**	▼1	**1520**	▼6
48	48	Hong Kong	Division III B	560	—	560	560	560	220	**1400**	Steady	**2055**	▲5
49	52	North Korea	Division III B	580	—	580	580	—	360	**1305**	▲3	**1105**	Steady
50	51	Mongolia	Division III B	520	—	540	480	460	—	**1280**	▲1	**1130**	Steady
51	49	Philippines	Division III B	500	—	520	540	480	100	**1280**	▼2	**1190**	▼1
52	50	Singapore	Division IV A	480	—	500	520	540	120	**1250**	▼2	**1190**	▲1
53	54	Kuwait	Division IV A	440	—	440	460	440	80	**1100**	▲1	**1725**	▲6
54	53	Iran	Division IV B	400	—	400	500	520	140	**1080**	▼1	**1750**	▲8
55	56	Indonesia	Division IV A	420	—	420	440	420	—	**1060**	▲1	**960**	Steady
56	55	Malaysia	Division IV B	380	—	380	420	500	100	**1000**	▼1	**970**	Steady
57	57	Uzbekistan	Division III A	600	—	480	—	—	—	**960**	Steady	**480**	Steady
58	58	Armenia	Division IV A	460	—	460	—	—	—	**805**	Steady	**460**	Steady
NR	NR	India	Division IV B	—	—	—	—	—	—	—	Steady	—	Steady
NR	NR	Morocco	Division IV B	—	—	—	—	—	—	—	Steady	—	Steady

== Women's rankings ==
IIHF World Women's Ranking Leaders
Canada (4,730 days); **United States (3,720 days)**
Current holder shown in **bold**

The current women's ranking (as of November 2026) is based on the performance at the World Championships of 2026, 2025, 2024, and 2023 , and at the Olympic ice hockey tournament of 2026.

The following table lists the ranking following the 2026 Women's Ice Hockey World Championships. and the calculations of the rankings following the 2026 Winter Olympics. Scores in italics represent minimum possible scores for unfinished tournaments. All tournament's points have their full value displayed, while the ranking is calculated by adding the current year's tournament points to the depreciated previous three years' tournament points as explained above. The depreciated percentages are shown in the column headings, first for the current total, then for the new total. The "Total" columns are the sums of the current tournament points and the depreciated values for past tournaments. The "+/–" columns indicate the increase or decrease in ranking since the last tournament. A dash in a tournament column indicates that the country did not participate.

Nov 2026 Rank	Feb 2026 Rank	Team	WC division (as of 2026)	WC2026 (—) (100%)	OLY2026 (100%) (100%)	WC2025 (75%) (75%)	WC2024 (50%) (50%)	WC2023 (25%) (25%)	WC2022 (25%) (0%)	Nov 2026 Total	+/−	Feb 2026 Total	+/−		
1	1	United States	Championship	1600	1600	1600	1560	1600	1160	5580	Steady	**5460**	Steady		
2	2	Canada	Championship	1560	1560	1560	1600	1560	1200	5480	Steady	**5400**	Steady		
3	5	Finland	Championship	1500	1440	1520	1520	1460	1040	5205	▲2	**5090**	▼2		
4	6	Sweden	Championship	1520	1500	1440	1420	1440	1020	5170	▲2	**4980**	Steady		
5	4	Switzerland	Championship	1440	1520	1460	1460	1500	1100	5160	▼1	**5100**	▲1		
6	3	Czechia	Championship	1420	1460	1500	1500	1520	1120	5135	▼3	**5125**	▲1		
NR	NR	Russia	Expelled	1420	1440	1440	1440	1460	1100	5025	Steady	**4965**	Steady		
7	7	Germany	Championship	1460	1420	1400	1440	1400	960	5000	Steady	**4840**	▲1		
8	8	Japan	Championship	1340	1360	1420	1400	1420	1060	4820	Steady	**4805**	▼1		
9	10	Denmark	Championship	1400	1320	1300	1340	1300	940	4690	▲1	**4510**	Steady		
10	9	Hungary	Division I A	1300	1300	1340	1300	1360	1000	4595	▼1	**4545**	Steady		
11	11	France	Division I A	1320	1340	1260	1280	1340	920	4580	Steady	**4460**	▲3		
12	13	Austria	Championship	1360	1280	1320	1260	1280	860	4580	▲1	**4400**	Steady		
13	12	Norway	Division I A	1240	1260	1360	1320	1240	900	4490	▼1	**4455**	▼1		
14	15	Italy	Division I A	1280	1400	1200	1160	1160	780	4450	▲1	**4245**	▲2		
15	14	China	Division I A	1220	1240	1240	1360	1320	820	4400	▼1	**4365**	▼2		
16	17	Slovakia	Division I A	1260	1180	1280	1200	1220	880	4305	▲1	**4190**	▼2		
17	16	Netherlands	Division I B	1200	1220	1220	1240	1260	840	4270	▼1	**4210**	Steady		
18	19	Great Britain	Division I B	1180	1160	1160	1140	1120	700	4060	▲1	**3910**	Steady		
19	18	South Korea	Division I B	1140	1140	1120	1220	1200	740	4030	▼1	**3960**	Steady		
20	21	Latvia	Division I B	1120	1100	1180	1180	1080	680	3965	▲1	**3875**	▲2		
21	22	Kazakhstan	Division I B	1160	1120	1140	1080	1100	760	3950	▲1	**3810**	Steady		
22	20	Poland	Division II A	1080	1200	1060	1100	1180	800	3920	▼2	**3875**	Steady		
23	23	Slovenia	Division II A	1060	1080	1100	1120	1140	720	3810	Steady	**3770**	▼2		
24	24	Spain	Division I B	1100	1020	1080	1060	1060	660	3725	Steady	**3590**	Steady		
25	26	Chinese Taipei	Division II A	1040	1040	1020	1020	1020	640	3610	▲1	**3495**	▼1		
26	27	Iceland	Division II A	1000	1000	1040	1000	1000	580	3530	▲1	**3435**	Steady		
27	25	Mexico	Division II B	900	1060	980	1040	1040	620	3475	▼2	**3495**	▲1		
28	29	Lithuania	Division II B	960	960	840	800	800	440	3150	▲1	**2910**	▼2		
29	28	Turkey	Division III A	820	980	860	880	860	540	3100	▼1	**3095**	▼1		
30	31	Romania	Division III A	860	900	780	820	780	420	2950	▲1	**2790**	▲5		
31	30	Croatia	Division III A	800	920	760	760	880	500	2890	▼1	**2815**	▲6		
32	33	Serbia	Division III A	780	860	800	780	720	320	2810	▲1	**2685**	▲7	**1825**	Steady
33	32	Bulgaria	Division III A	760	940	720	740	760	420	2800	▼1	**2700**	▲5		
34	34	Estonia	Division III B	740	880	680	700	740	340	2665	Steady	**2540**	▲7		
35	38	Thailand	Division III A	840	840	820	720	—	—	2655	▲3	**2200**	▼6		
36	35	Australia	Division II A	1020	—	960	940	940	560	2445	▼1	**2275**	▼7		
37	39	Hong Kong	Division II B	980	—	880	920	840	380	2310	▲2	**2085**	▼8		
38	37	New Zealand	Division II B	920	—	940	900	920	540	2305	▼1	**2210**	▼5		
39	36	Belgium	Division II B	880	—	900	980	960	460	2285	▼3	**2230**	▼6		
40	40	Ukraine	Division II B	940	—	920	840	820	460	2255	Steady	**2075**	▼6		
41	41	South Africa	Division III B	700	—	740	860	900	520	1910	Steady	**1965**	▼6		
42	43	Israel	Division III B	680	—	700	680	700	280	1720	▲1	**1630**	▼1		
43	44	Bosnia and Herzegovina	Division III B	720	—	660	660	680	300	1715	▲1	**1570**	▼1]		
44	45	Singapore	Division III B	640	—	640	660	—	—	1450	▲1	**1135**	Steady		
45	42	North Korea	Division II A	—	—	1000	960	—	620	1230	▼3	**1875**	▼3		
46	new	Philippines	Division III B	660	—	—	—	—	—	660	Steady	new	Steady		

== See also ==
- List of IIHF World Rankings

== Notes ==
Bosnia and Herzegovina seems to have been given an incorrect score in 2024. They were shown to have 1395 points in the 2024 World Ranking list which calculates to earning 660 points that year instead of the 640 points they should have earned for 46th place. Singapore was also awarded 660 points.
