= 2015 IIHF Challenge Cup of Asia – Division I =

2015 IIHF Challenge Cup of Asia - Division 1
Tournament details
- Host country: Kuwait
- Venue(s): 1 (in 1 host city)
- Dates: 18 – 24 April 2015
- Teams: 6

Final positions
- Champions: Kuwait (1st title)
- Runner-up: Singapore
- Third place: Kyrgyzstan

Tournament statistics
- Games played: 15

The 2015 IIHF Challenge Cup of Asia, Division I was the international ice hockey competition played between 18 April and 24 April 2015 in Kuwait City, Kuwait.

== Round-round ==
=== Participants ===
| Team | 2014 Results |
|---|---|
| Kyrgyzstan | 2nd in Division I in 2014 |
| Singapore | 3rd in Division I in 2014 |
| India | 4th in Division I in 2014 |
| Kuwait | Host, 6th in Top Division in 2014 |
| Malaysia | did not participate in 2014 |
| Oman | did not participate in 2014 |

=== Standings ===
| Pos | Team | Pld | W | OTW | OTL | L | GF | GA | GD | Pts | Promotion |
|---|---|---|---|---|---|---|---|---|---|---|---|
| 1 | Kuwait | 5 | 5 | 0 | 0 | 0 | 30 | 8 | +22 | 15 | Promoted to Top Division 2016 |
| 2 | Singapore | 5 | 4 | 0 | 0 | 1 | 36 | 11 | +25 | 12 | Promoted to Top Division 2016 |
| 3 | Kyrgyzstan | 5 | 3 | 0 | 0 | 2 | 27 | 22 | +5 | 9 | |
| 4 | Oman | 5 | 0 | 2 | 0 | 3 | 20 | 36 | −16 | 4 | |
| 5 | Malaysia | 5 | 1 | 0 | 1 | 3 | 29 | 23 | +6 | 4 | |
| 6 | India | 5 | 0 | 0 | 1 | 4 | 12 | 54 | −42 | 1 | |

Source: IIHF

All times local. (UTC+02:00)

| 18 April 2015; 13:00 | Kyrgyzstan | 6 – 5 (1–1, 3–2, 2–2) | Malaysia | Ice Skating Rink; Attendance: 132 |

Game reference
| Elzar Bolotbekov; Adilet Zhyrgalbek Uulu | Goalies | Tengku Azily Tengku Abdillah; Wai Sang Lee |
| 45 | Shots | 37 |

| 18 April 2015; 16:30 | Oman | 6 – 5 (SO) (3–1, 1–1, 2–1, 0:0, 1:0) | India | Ice Skating Rink; Attendance: 120 |

Game reference
| Yousuf Al Naimi; Hamdoon Al Rashdi | Goalies | Nawang Dorje; Rigzin Dorjay |
| 29 | Shots | 32 |

| 18 April 2015; 20:00 | Singapore | 3 – 5 (1–2, 1–2, 1–1) | Kuwait | Ice Skating Rink; Attendance: 230 |

Game reference
| Khai Shene Eugene Chin; Chin Ming Kenny Liang | Goalies | Jasem Al Sarraf; Ali Al Qadiri |
| 18 | Shots | 25 |

| 19 April 2015; 13:00 | Malaysia | 7 – 8 (SO) (2–3, 1–2, 4–2, 0-0, 0:1) | Oman | Ice Skating Rink; Attendance: 72 |

Game reference
| Tengku Azily Tengku Abdillah; Wai Sang Lee | Goalies | Yousuf Al Naimi; Hamdoon Al Rashdi |
| 24 | Shots | 49 |

| 19 April 2015; 16:30 | Kyrgyzstan | 2 – 4 (1–1, 0–2, 1-1) | Singapore | Ice Skating Rink; Attendance: 106 |

Game reference
| Elzar Bolotbekov; Adilet Zhyrgalbek Uulu | Goalies | Khai Shene Eugene Chin; Chin Ming Kenny Liang |
| 34 | Shots | 40 |

| 19 April 2015; 20:00 | Kuwait | 10 – 2 (2–0, 2–0, 6-2) | India | Ice Skating Rink; Attendance: 28 |

Game reference
| Ali Al Qadiri; Jasem Al Sarraf | Goalies | Nawang Dorje; Rigzin Dorjay |
| 36 | Shots | 17 |

| 21 April 2015; 13:00 | Singapore | 13 – 0 (4–0, 4–0, 5-0) | India | Ice Skating Rink; Attendance: 26 |

Game reference
| Chin Ming Kenny Liang; Khai Shene Eugene Chin | Goalies | Nawang Dorje; Rigzin Dorjay] |
| 70 | Shots | 9 |

| 21 April 2015; 16:30 | Kyrgyzstan | 7 – 3 (2–2, 3–1, 2-0) | Oman | Ice Skating Rink; Attendance: 86 |

Game reference
| Elzar Bolotbekov; Adilet Zhyrgalbek Uulu | Goalies | Yousuf Al Naimi; Hamdoon Al Rashdi |
| 57 | Shots | 18 |

| 21 April 2015; 20:00 | Kuwait | 1 – 0 (0–0, 0–0, 1-0) | Malaysia | Ice Skating Rink; Attendance: 232 |

Game reference
| Jasem Al Sarraf; Ali Al Qadiri | Goalies | Tengku Azily Tengku Abdillah; Wai Sang Lee |
| 43 | Shots | 18 |

| 22 April 2015; 13:00 | India | 1 – 9 (1–3, 0–3, 0-3) | Kyrgyzstan | Ice Skating Rink; Attendance: 45 |

Game reference
| Nawang Dorje; Rigzin Dorjay | Goalies | Elzar Bolotbekov; Adilet Zhyrgalbek Uulu |
| 11 | Shots | 62 |

| 22 April 2015; 16:30 | Malaysia | 1 – 4 (0–1, 1–2, 0-1) | Singapore | Ice Skating Rink; Attendance: 81 |

Game reference
| Tengku Azily Tengku Abdillah; Wai Sang Lee | Goalies | Chin Ming Kenny Liang; Khai Shene Eugene Chin |
| 29 | Shots | 52 |

| 22 April 2015; 20:00 | Oman | 0 – 5 (0–4, 0–1, 0-0) | Kuwait | Ice Skating Rink; Attendance: 203 |

Game reference
| Yousuf Al Naimi; Hamdoon Al Rashdi | Goalies | Jasem Al Sarraf; Ali Al Qadiri |
| 19 | Shots | 61 |

| 24 April 2015; 13:00 | Singapore | 12 – 3 (5–1, 2–2, 5-0) | Oman | Ice Skating Rink; Attendance: 74 |

Game reference
| Chin Ming Kenny Liang; Khai Shene Eugene Chin | Goalies | Hamdoon Al Rashdi; Yousuf Al Naimi |
| 56 | Shots | 24 |

| 24 April 2015; 16:30 | India | 4 – 16 (1–6, 1–7, 2-3) | Malaysia | Ice Skating Rink; Attendance: 93 |

Game reference
| Nawang Dorje; Rigzin Dorjay | Goalies | Wai Sang Lee; Tengku Azily Tengku Abdillah |
| 31 | Shots | 61 |

| 24 April 2015; 20:00 | Kuwait | 9 – 3 (2–0, 4–2, 3-1) | Kyrgyzstan | Ice Skating Rink; Attendance: 303 |

Game reference
| Jasem Al Sarraf; Ali Al Qadiri | Goalies | Elzar Bolotbekov; Adilet Zhyrgalbek Uulu |
| 55 | Shots | 29 |
