= Malaysia men's national ice hockey team =

Malaysia
- Association: Malaysia Ice Hockey Federation
- General manager: Nurhidayah Badaruddin
- Head coach: Kazunori Miura
- Assistants: Brandon Tan
- Captain: Mohammad Oryza
- Most games: Brandon Tan (57)
- Top scorer: Ban Kin Loke (77)
- Most points: Ban Kin Loke (131)
- Team colors
- IIHF code: MAS
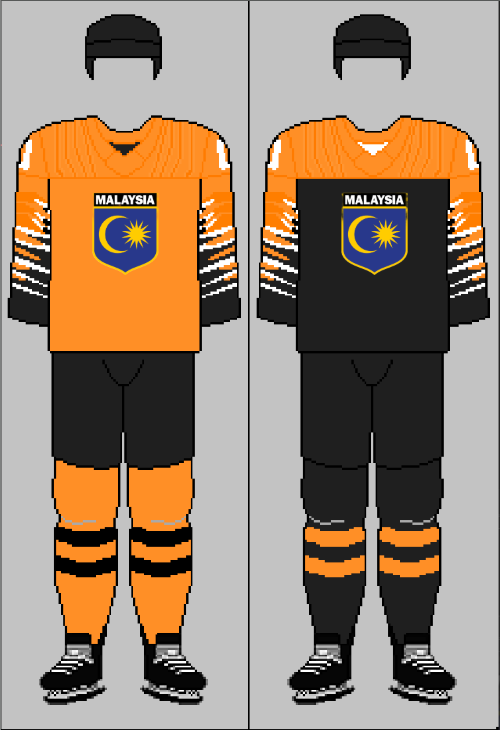

Ranking
- Current IIHF: 56 ▼1 (3 June 2026)
- Highest IIHF: 52 (2023)
- Lowest IIHF: 55 (2024-25)

First international
- Malaysia 7–3 Hong Kong (Changchun, China; 26 January 2007)

Biggest win
- Malaysia 25–0 Bahrain (Astana, Kazakhstan; 28 January 2011)

Biggest defeat
- Kyrgyzstan 22–0 Malaysia (Sarajevo, Bosnia and Herzegovina; 2 March 2023)

IIHF World Championships
- Appearances: 4 (first in 2022)
- Best result: 48th (2022)

Asian Winter Games
- Appearances: 3 (first in 2007)
- Best result: 8th (2007)

IIHF Challenge Cup of Asia
- Appearances: 10 (first in 2008)
- Best result: 2nd (2008)

Southeast Asian Games
- Appearances: 1 (first in 2017)
- Best result: 3rd (2017)

International record (W–L–T)
- 34–63–2

Medal record
Silver medal – second place	2008 Hong Kong	
Bronze medal – third place	2009 Abu Dhabi	
Bronze medal – third place	2012 Dehradun	

Southeast Asian Games
Bronze medal – third place	2017 Kuala Lumpur	Team

The Malaysian national ice hockey team (Malay: Pasukan hoki ais kebangsaan Malaysia) is the national men's ice hockey team of Malaysia. The team is controlled by the Malaysia Ice Hockey Federation and has been an associate member of the International Ice Hockey Federation (IIHF) since 28 September 2006.

Malaysia is currently ranked 55th in the IIHF World Ranking and 17th in the specialized Asian national team ranking.

Ice hockey was part of the 2017 SEA Games held in Kuala Lumpur. Malaysia's IIHF World Championship debut was delayed from 2020 to 2022 due to COVID-related cancellations in 2020 and 2021.

== Malaysian Invitational 3-on-3 Hockey Tournament ==
In the 2009 edition of this tournament, the Malaysian team defeating Hong Kong in a game by a score of 8–7 in front of a crowd at Sunway Pyramid. In 2010, the Malaysian team was undefeated on their way to the final against Kuwait. In the final, Malaysia hung on to a 5–4 victory and their second MIHF tournament victory in as many years.

== Tournament record ==
=== World Championship ===
Year	Host	Result	Pld	W	OTW	OTL	L
2020	(Kyrgyzstan) Bishkek	Cancelled due to the COVID-19 pandemic					
2021	(Kyrgyzstan) Bishkek	Lower division tournaments cancelled due to the COVID-19 pandemic					
2022	(Kyrgyzstan) Bishkek	48th place (4th and Promoted from Division IV)	4	1	0	0	3
2023	(Bosnia and Herzegovina) Sarajevo	52nd place (6th and Relegated from Division III B)	5	1	0	0	4
2024	Kuwait City	56th place (4th in Division IV)	3	0	0	1	2
2025	(Armenia) Yerevan	58th place (6th in Division IV)	5	0	0	0	5
2026	Kuwait City	Cancelled due to the 2026 Iran War					
Total		4 appearances	17	2	0	1	14

=== Asian Winter Games ===
- 2007 – 8th place
- 2011 – 10th place (5th in Premier Division)
- 2017 – 15th place (5th in Division II)

=== Challenge Cup of Asia ===
- 2008 – 2nd place
- 2009 – 3rd place
- 2010 – 4th place
- 2012 – 3rd place
- 2013 – 5th place
- 2015 – 10th place (5th in Division I)
- 2016 – 7th place ( 2nd in Division I)
- 2017 – 5th place
- 2018 – 6th place ( 1st in Division I)
- 2019 – 4th place

=== Southeast Asian Games ===
- 2017 – 3rd place
- 2019 – 4th place

== All-time record against other nations ==
Last match update: 19 April 2025

Team	GP	W	T	L	GF	GA
Armenia	1	0	0	1	3	24
Bahrain	1	1	0	0	25	0
Bosnia and Herzegovina	1	0	0	1	1	15
Chinese Taipei	3	1	0	2	6	14
Hong Kong	4	3	0	1	16	24
India	6	6	0	0	78	15
Indonesia	7	5	0	2	62	27
Iran	4	0	0	4	11	34
Kuwait	10	4	0	6	44	71
Kyrgyzstan	5	0	0	5	13	82
Macau	9	8	0	1	56	18
Mongolia	6	1	0	5	27	53
North Korea	1	0	0	1	0	15
Oman	1	0	0	1	7	8
Philippines	4	0	0	4	13	47
Qatar	1	1	0	0	3	1
Singapore	12	3	1	8	34	74
South Korea	1	0	0	1	1	14
Thailand	10	1	1	8	22	102
Turkmenistan	1	0	0	1	2	9
United Arab Emirates	6	0	0	6	7	46
Uzbekistan	1	0	0	1	3	18
Total (22)	95	34	2	59	434	711
