= Macau men's national ice hockey team =

National men's ice hockey team of Macau, China

Macau
- Association: Macau Ice Sports Federation
- General manager: Winston Chan
- Head coach: Ho Chon Nin
- Captain: Chon Kong Leong
- Most games: Chon Kong Leong (58)
- Most points: Ho Chon Nin (35)
- Team colors
- IIHF code: MAC

Ranking
- Current IIHF: NR (3 June 2026)

First international
- Hong Kong 30–1 Macau (Harbin, China; 6 January 2003)

Biggest win
- Macau 12–0 India (Bishkek, Kyrgyzstan; 24 February 2014)

Biggest defeat
- Chinese Taipei 30–0 Macau (Taipei, Republic of China; 15 March 2015)

Asian Winter Games
- Appearances: 2 (first in 2007)
- Best result: 11th (2007)

IIHF Challenge Cup of Asia
- Appearances: 7 (first in 2008)
- Best result: 5th (2011)

International record (W–L–T)
- 24–58–5

Macau men's national ice hockey team

Chinese name
- Traditional Chinese: 澳門國家冰球隊
- Simplified Chinese: 澳门国家冰球队
Transcriptions
Standard Mandarin
- Hanyu Pinyin: Àomén Guójiā Bīngqiú Duì

Portuguese name
- Portuguese: Seleção de Macau de Hóquei no Gelo

The Macau national ice hockey team is the national men's ice hockey team that represents Macau, China in international competitions and as an associate member of the International Ice Hockey Federation (IIHF). Macau is not ranked in the IIHF World Rankings and have not entered in any World Championships nor at any Olympic Games, but have played in the Challenge Cup of Asia, a regional tournament for lower-tier hockey nations in Asia. Macau holds 27th place in the latest edition of the all-Asian ranking.

== Tournament record ==
=== Asian Winter Games ===
Year	Host	Result	Pld	W	OTW	OTL	L
2025	(China) Harbin	13th	4	0	1	0	3
Total			4	0	1	0	3

== Roster ==
Roster for the 2016 IIHF Challenge Cup of Asia – Division I.

Goaltenders
#	Player	Catches	Height	Weight	Date of birth	Club
1	Te Lin Chu	L	170 cm (5 ft 7 in)	80 kg (180 lb)	15 October 1985 (age 41)	(Macau) No Team
23	Wai Tong Vong	L	176 cm (5 ft 9 1/2 in)	80 kg (180 lb)	3 May 1991 (age 35)	(Macau) Diamond
Defencemen
#	Player	Shoots	Height	Weight	Date of birth	Club
14	Ka Miu Chon	L	170 cm (5 ft 7 in)	65 kg (143 lb)	19 January 1984 (age 42)	(Macau) Supreme
37	Bartolomeu Herculano Do Rosário Guerra	R	177 cm (5 ft 9 1/2 in)	80 kg (180 lb)	27 August 1998 (age 28)	(Macau) Diamond
8	Chon Nin Ho	L	171 cm (5 ft 7 1/2 in)	72 kg (159 lb)	4 August 1980 (age 46)	(Macau) No Team
21	Chong Man Kong	R	189 cm (6 ft 2 1/2 in)	88 kg (194 lb)	23 December 1988 (age 37)	(Macau) Supreme
12	Chon Kong Leong	L	177 cm (5 ft 9 1/2 in)	78 kg (172 lb)	27 November 1984 (age 41)	(Macau) Supreme
2	Chon Seng U	R	170 cm (5 ft 7 in)	62 kg (137 lb)	14 July 1998 (age 28)	(Macau) No Team
Forwards
#	Player	Shoots	Height	Weight	Date of birth	Club
4	Ka Lok Chan	L	168 cm (5 ft 6 in)	55 kg (121 lb)	10 June 2000 (age 26)	(Macau) Diamond
33	Keng Lam Fong	L	177 cm (5 ft 9 1/2 in)	94 kg (207 lb)	15 December 1990 (age 35)	(Macau) Kaneng
71	Hou Kan Kam	L	170 cm (5 ft 7 in)	68 kg (150 lb)	30 May 1992 (age 34)	(Macau) No Team
7	Ka Yu Jonay Leung	R	171 cm (5 ft 7 1/2 in)	57 kg (126 lb)	29 January 1993 (age 33)	(Macau) No Team
19	Kim Kei Mok	R	170 cm (5 ft 7 in)	65 kg (143 lb)	1 March 1992 (age 34)	(Macau) Diamond
88	Kim Hei Mok	R	170 cm (5 ft 7 in)	65 kg (143 lb)	21 March 1995 (age 31)	(Macau) No Team
16	Ka Kit Pong	R	170 cm (5 ft 7 in)	74 kg (163 lb)	22 December 1988 (age 37)	(Macau) Supreme
3	Katsuyoshi Shinoda	R	173 cm (5 ft 8 in)	59 kg (130 lb)	2 October 1997 (age 29)	(Macau) Diamond
5	Kin Fai Un	L	170 cm (5 ft 7 in)	70 kg (150 lb)	20 April 1972 (age 54)	(Macau) Supreme

== All-time record against other nations ==
As of 10 February 2025

Team	GP	W	T	L	GF	GA
Bahrain	1	1	0	0	4	3
China	1	0	0	1	0	26
Chinese Taipei	3	0	0	3	0	50
Hong Kong	22	5	3	14	58	167
Indonesia	4	3	0	1	17	13
India	11	7	0	4	59	31
Iran	1	1	0	0	7	1
Kuwait	5	0	1	4	7	35
Kyrgyzstan	3	1	0	2	7	15
Malaysia	9	1	0	8	18	56
Mongolia	3	0	0	3	3	18
Oman	3	1	0	2	8	10
Philippines	2	0	0	2	2	19
Qatar	3	2	0	1	7	4
Singapore	6	2	1	3	13	20
Thailand	5	0	0	5	6	27
Turkmenistan	2	0	0	2	0	42
United Arab Emirates	3	0	0	3	0	22
Total	87	24	5	58	216	559

== See also ==
- Sports in Macau
