= 2022 IIHF World Championship Division IV =

Ice hockey competition

Tournament details
- Host country: Kyrgyzstan
- Venue(s): 1 (in 1 host city)
- Dates: 3–8 March
- Teams: 5

Tournament statistics
- Games played: 10
- Goals scored: 115 (11.5 per game)
- Attendance: 7,666 (767 per game)
- Scoring leader(s): (Kyrgyzstan) Vladimir Nosov (20 points)

Official website
- Website

The 2022 IIHF World Championship Division IV was an international ice hockey tournament organised by the International Ice Hockey Federation.

The tournament was held in Bishkek, Kyrgyzstan from 3 to 8 March 2022.

This was the first edition of the Division IV tournament, which had been cancelled the previous two years.

Kyrgyzstan won the tournament, earning promotion to Division III Group B for 2023. Iran, Singapore and Malaysia were also promoted with Kuwait continuing to participate in Division IV.

== Participants ==
Team	Qualification
Kuwait	Placed 5th in Division III Q in 2019.
Kyrgyzstan	Host, placed 6th in Division III Q in 2019.
Malaysia	First time participating in tournament.
~~Philippines~~	Was supposed to be the first time participating in tournament.
Singapore	First time participating in tournament.
Iran	First time participating in tournament.

== Match officials ==
Two referees and five linesmen were selected for the tournament.

Referees	Linesmen
(Kazakhstan) Vladimir Suslov; (Romania) Mihai Paul	(Georgia (country)) Tornike Kuchava; (Kazakhstan) Timur Iskakov; (Kazakhstan) Alexander Yadryshnikov; (Kyrgyzstan) Yntymak Abdykalykov; (Malaysia) Edmond Ng

== Standings ==
Pos	Team	Pld	W	OTW	OTL	L	GF	GA	GD	Pts	Promotion
1	Kyrgyzstan (H, P)	4	4	0	0	0	64	2	+62	12	Promoted to the 2023 Division III B
2	Iran (P)	4	3	0	0	1	22	20	+2	9	Promoted to the 2023 Division III B
3	Singapore (P)	4	2	0	0	2	14	22	−8	6	Promoted to the 2023 Division III B
4	Malaysia (P)	4	1	0	0	3	11	39	−28	3	Promoted to the 2023 Division III B
5	Kuwait	4	0	0	0	4	4	32	−28	0	
6	Philippines (Note: The Philippines withdrew their team on 13 December 2021 because of the COVID-19 pandemic, as they were unable to practice as the ice rinks were closed.)	0	0	0	0	0	0	0	0	0	Withdrawn

Source: IIHF
Rules for classification: 1) points; 2) head-to-head points; 3) head-to-head goal difference; 4) head-to-head number of goals scored; 5) result against closest best-ranked team outside tied teams; 6) result against second-best ranked team outside tied teams; 7) seeding before tournament.
(H) Host; (P) Promoted

== Results ==
All times are local (UTC+6)

3 March 2022; 16:00	Kuwait	2–5 (1–0, 0–5, 1–0)	Malaysia	Gorodskoi Katok, Bishkek; Attendance: 135

Game reference

Ahmad Al-Saegh
Goalies
Meng Chow
Referee:
(Kazakhstan) Vladimir Suslov
Linesmen:
(Georgia (country)) Tornike Kuchava
(Malaysia) Edmond Ng

Al-Ajmi (Al-Kandari, Al-Maraghy) – 04:53	1–0
	1–1	20:32 – Mohammed (PP)
	1–2	32:51 – Mohammed (Versluis, Muhd) (PP)
	1–3	34:23 – Muhammad (Shaharudin, Raja)
	1–4	37:28 – Muhammad (Low)
	1–5	38:55 – Goh (Muhd)
A. Al-Sarraf – 46:56	2–5

16 min
Penalties
12 min
29
Shots
22

3 March 2022; 20:00	Iran	1–13 (1–4, 0–6, 0–3)	Kyrgyzstan	Gorodskoi Katok, Bishkek; Attendance: 1,800

Game reference

Oveis Hassanzadeh
Alireza Mahdavi
Goalies
Alexander Petrov
Kadyr Alymbekov
Referee:
(Romania) Mihai Paul
Linesmen:
(Kazakhstan) Timur Iskakov
(Kazakhstan) Alexander Yadryshnikov

	0–1	02:09 – Nosov (Egorov, Terentyev) (PP)
	0–2	08:23 – Chuvalov (PP)
Keyhanfar (Mehraban, Houshidari) – 13:37	1–2
	1–3	14:43 – Chuvalov (Nosov, Tonkikh) (PP2)
	1–4	18:24 – Abdyraev (Kachkynbekov)
	1–5	22:18 – Kim
	1–6	27:48 – Egorov (Abdyraev) (PP)
	1–7	29:42 – Nosov (Chuvalov) (PP)
	1–8	29:57 – Titov (Mirbekov, Abdyraev)
	1–9	32:08 – Titov (Egorov, Nosov) (PP)
	1–10	32:50 – Abdyraev (Kudashev)
	1–11	40:15 – Nosov (Chuvalov)
	1–12	42:50 – Tonkikh (Egorov, Nosov) (PP)
	1–13	59:42 – Tikhonov (Asanaliev) (SH)

42 min
Penalties
22 min
15
Shots
67

4 March 2022; 19:00	Singapore	2–5 (0–3, 1–0, 1–2)	Iran	Gorodskoi Katok, Bishkek; Attendance: 104

Game reference

Joshua Lee
Goalies
Oveis Hassanzadeh
Referee:
(Kazakhstan) Vladimir Suslov
Linesmen:
(Kyrgyzstan) Yntymak Abdykalykov
(Georgia (country)) Tornike Kuchava

	0–1	15:53 – Ghorbani (Housidari) (PP2)
	0–2	16:24 – Keyhanfar (Moghadasi) (PP)
	0–3	16:58 – Housidari (SH)
Chan (Chwe) (EA) – 34:51	1–3
	1–4	45:05 – Keyhanfar (Housidari) (PP)
Chan (Goh) – 45:49	2–4
	2–5	58:19 – Moghadasi (Ghorbani) (EN)

32 min
Penalties
26 min
21
Shots
41

5 March 2022; 17:00	Singapore	4–0 (2–0, 2–0, 0–0)	Kuwait	Gorodskoi Katok, Bishkek; Attendance: 200

Game reference

Joshua Lee
Goalies
Jasem Al-Sarraf
Referee:
(Romania) Mihai Paul
Linesmen:
(Malaysia) Edmond Ng
(Kazakhstan) Alexander Yadryshnikov

Tan (Chua) (PP) – 06:39	1–0
Redden (PP2) – 16:45	2–0
Chan (Chua) – 21:51	3–0
Redden (Chew, Wong) – 30:07	4–0

12 min
Penalties
20 min
30
Shots
27

5 March 2022; 20:00	Kyrgyzstan	22–1 (6–0, 10–1, 6–0)	Malaysia	Gorodskoi Katok, Bishkek; Attendance: 1,712

Game reference

Alexander Petrov
Kadyr Alymbekov
Goalies
Muhammad Haikal
Meng Chow
Referee:
(Kazakhstan) Vladimir Suslov
Linesmen:
(Kazakhstan) Timur Iskakov
(Georgia (country)) Tornike Kuchava

Nosov (Tonkikh) – 03:12	1–0
Egorov (PP) – 05:57	2–0
Nosov (Terentyev, Chuvalov) – 07:50	3–0
Titov (Mirbekov) – 08:07	4–0
Kudashev – 16:21	5–0
Tonkikh (Nosov) – 17:25	6–0
Ismanov (Tynaliev) – 21:25	7–0
	7–1	21:53 – Versluis
Tonkikh (Chuvalov, Nosov) – 22:39	8–1
Myrzabaev (Tursunbekov) – 23:23	9–1
Ismanov – 23:47	10–1
Tonkikh (Chuvalov) – 25:47	11–1
Tynaliev (Ismanov) – 27:26	12–1
Kim (SH) – 29:41	13–1
Ismanov (SH) – 31:20	14–1
Nosov (Chuvalov) – 32:04	15–1
Titov (Abdyraev) – 32:30	16–1
Mirbekov (Titov) – 41:35	17–1
Ismanov (Kim) (PP) – 43:33	18–1
Titov (Mirbekov, Abdyraev) – 46:36	19–1
Kim (Egorov) – 47:07	20–1
Abdyraev (Titov) (PP) – 51:29	21–1
Chuvalov (Nosov) – 53:02	22–1

12 min
Penalties
6 min
89
Shots
5

6 March 2022; 19:00	Iran	9–2 (4–0, 3–0, 2–2)	Kuwait	Gorodskoi Katok, Bishkek; Attendance: 74

Game reference

Oveis Hassanzadeh<bt>Alireza Mahdavi
Goalies
Jasem Al-Sarraf
Referee:
(Kazakhstan) Vladimir Suslov
Linesmen:
(Kyrgyzstan) Yntymak Abdykalykov
(Kazakhstan) Alexander Yadryshnikov

Houshidari – 00:40	1–0
Ghorbani (Keyhanfar) (PP2) – 04:42	2–0
Ghorbani (Houshidari) (PP) – 11:43	3–0
Ghahar (Bagheri) – 13:19	4–0
Houshidari (Keyhanfar) (SH) – 25:15	5–0
Houshidari (PS) – 30:56	6–0
Mehraban (Bagheri) – 38:40	7–0
	7–1	46:56 – Al-Ajmi
	7–2	48:37– A. Al-Sarraf
Mehraban (Ghorbani) (PP) – 50:07	8–2
Keyhanfar (Mehraban) (PP) – 51:39	9–2

50 min
Penalties
68 min
38
Shots
26

7 March 2022; 17:00	Malaysia	3–7 (2–2, 1–2, 0–3)	Iran	Gorodskoi Katok, Bishkek; Attendance: 165

Game reference

Meng Chow
Goalies
Oveis Hassanzadeh
Alireza Mahdavi
Referee:
(Kazakhstan) Vladimir Suslov
Linesmen:
(Kyrgyzstan) Yntymak Abdykalykov
(Kazakhstan) Alexander Yadryshnikov

Muhd (SH) – 01:58	1–0
	1–1	11:27 – Korehei (Ghafoori, Moghadasi) (PP)
Mohammad (Versluis, Goh) – 15:23	2–1
	2–2	16:51 – Aghamohammadi (Ghorbani)
Aiman Zul (SH) – 22:27	3–2
	3–3	24:10 – Ghorbani (Keyhanfar, Bahri) (PP)
	3–4	39:59 – Bagheri (Ghorbani) (PP)
	3–5	44:07 – Houshidari (Bahri, Keyhanfar) (SH)
	3–6	52:12 – Ghafoori (Keyhanfar, Korehei)
	3–7	57:20 – Heidari (Keyhanfar)

14 min
Penalties
10 min
11
Shots
51

7 March 2022; 20:00	Kyrgyzstan	15–0 (6–0, 4–0, 5–0)	Singapore	Gorodskoi Katok, Bishkek; Attendance: 1,723

Game reference

Alexander Petrov
Kadyr Alymbekov
Goalies
Joshua Lee
Referee:
(Romania) Mihai Paul
Linesmen:
(Kazakhstan) Timur Iskakov
(Malaysia) Edmond Ng

Chuvalov – 02:18	1–0
Titov (Abdyraev, Kudashev) (PP) – 04:24	2–0
Ismanov – 10:00	3–0
Nosov (Tonkikh) – 12:25	4–0
Tonkikh (Nosov) (SH) – 16:06	5–0
Chuvalov (Egorov) – 19:15	6–0
Tonkikh – 23:34	7–0
Tonkikh (Egorov) (PP) – 26:48	8–0
Tonkikh (Nosov, Egorov) (PP) – 31:44	9–0
Titov (Egorov, Abdyraev) (PP) – 37:27	10–0
Nosov (Tonkikh, Chuvalov) – 48:54	11–0
Titov (Kudashev, Abdyraev) – 51:01	12–0
Ismanov (Tynaliev, Kim) – 55:13	13–0
Tonkikh (Nosov, Terentyev) (SH) – 56:42	14–0
Terentyev (Egorov, Ismanov) (PP) – 59:36	15–0

8 min
Penalties
12 min
67
Shots
9

8 March 2022; 17:00	Malaysia	2–8 (1–2, 1–2, 0–4)	Singapore	Gorodskoi Katok, Bishkek; Attendance: 95

Game reference

Meng Chow
Goalies
Joshua Lee
Referee:
(Kazakhstan) Vladimir Suslov
Linesmen:
(Georgia (country)) Tornike Kuchava
(Kazakhstan) Alexander Yadryshnikov

	0–1	03:56 – B. Lee (Hamnett, Redden)
Mohammad (PP) – 13:45	1–1
	1–2	16:02 – Tan (Chew) (SH)
	1–3	31:10 – Redden (Chew) (PP)
Muhammad (PP) – 33:19	2–3
	2–4	35:03 – Chan (Chew) (PP)
	2–5	45:43 – Wong
	2–6	50:44 – Chan (Redden, Chew) (PP)
	2–7	53:06 – Redden (Wong) (PP)
	2–8	59:58 – Redden

16 min
Penalties
16 min
22
Shots
34

8 March 2022; 20:00	Kuwait	0–14 (0–4, 0–5, 0–5)	Kyrgyzstan	Gorodskoi Katok, Bishkek; Attendance: 1,658

Game reference

Jasem Al-Sarraf
Goalies
Kadyr Alymbekov
Alexander Petrov
Referee:
(Romania) Mihai Paul
Linesmen:
(Kazakhstan) Timur Iskakov
(Malaysia) Edmond Ng

0–1	02:06 – Tynaliev (Tonkikh, Myrzabaev)
0–2	03:18 – Nosov (Egorov)
0–3	06:04 – Abdyraev (Titov, Mirbekov)
0–4	09:16 – Mirbekov (Titov, Kachkynbekov)
0–5	21:13 – Kim
0–6	25:10 – Shamyrkanov (Chuvalov)
0–7	27:14 – Mirbekov (Abdyraev)
0–8	35:46 – Egorov (Chuvalov, Shamyrkanov)
0–9	36:26 – Ismanov
0–10	47:32 – Abdyraev (Titov) (PP)
0–11	49:54 – Ismanov (Tursunbekov, Nosov) (PP)
0–12	50:50 – Abdyraev (Terentyev, Mirbekov)
0–13	59:09 – Tursunbekov (Chuvalov, Shamyrkanov)
0–14	59:58 – Kim (Nosov)

14 min
Penalties
2 min
3
Shots
63

== Statistics ==
=== Scoring leaders ===
List shows the top skaters sorted by points, then goals.

Player	GP	G	A	Pts	+/−	PIM	POS
(Kyrgyzstan) Vladimir Nosov	4	9	11	20	+20	0	F
(Kyrgyzstan) Mikhail Chuvalov	4	5	10	15	+17	0	F
(Kyrgyzstan) Vladimir Tonkikh	4	9	5	14	+16	0	F
(Kyrgyzstan) Islambek Abdyraev	4	6	8	14	+12	0	F
(Kyrgyzstan) Alexander Titov	4	8	5	13	+11	2	F
(Kyrgyzstan) Maxim Egorov	4	3	10	13	+19	4	D
(Kyrgyzstan) Sultan Ismanov	4	8	2	10	+16	4	F
(Iran) Jalal Keyhanfar	4	4	6	10	+2	0	F
(Iran) Farzad Houshidari	4	5	4	9	−1	8	D
(Iran) Maziar Ghorbani	4	4	4	8	+1	4	D

GP = Games played; G = Goals; A = Assists; Pts = Points; +/− = P Plus–minus; PIM = Penalties In Minutes
Source: IIHF.com

=== Goaltending leaders ===
Only the top five goaltenders, based on save percentage, who have played at least 40% of their team's minutes, are included in this list.

Player	TOI	GA	GAA	SA	Sv%	SO
(Kyrgyzstan) Kadyr Alymbekov	116:36	0	0.00	23	100.00	0
(Singapore) Joshua Lee	211:30	15	4.26	131	88.55	1
(Iran) Alireza Mahdavi	98:04	8	4.89	55	85.45	0
(Iran) Oveis Hassanzadeh	141:56	12	5.07	70	82.86	0
(Malaysia) Meng Chow	216:13	29	8.05	169	82.84	0

TOI = Time On Ice (minutes:seconds); GA = Goals against; GAA = Goals against average; Sv% = Save percentage; SO = Shutouts
Source: IIHF.com

== Awards ==
Position	Player
Goaltender	(Singapore) Joshua Shao Ern Lee
Defenceman	(Iran) Farzad Houshidari
Forward	(Kyrgyzstan) Sultan Ismanov
