= 2014 IIHF Challenge Cup of Asia – Division I =

2014 IIHF Challenge Cup of Asia – Division 1

Tournament details
- Host country: Kyrgyzstan
- Venue: 1 (in 1 host city)
- Dates: 24 February – 2 March 2014
- Teams: 4

Final positions
- Champions: Macau (1st title)
- Runners-up: Kyrgyzstan
- Third place: Singapore

Tournament statistics
- Games played: 10

The 2014 IIHF Challenge Cup of Asia – Division I was an international ice hockey competition played between 24 February and 2 March 2014 in Bishkek, Kyrgyzstan.

== Round-robin ==
Participants
Team	2013 Results
Macau	3rd in Group B, lost quarter-finals in 2013
Singapore	4th in Group B, did not advance in 2013
India	5th in Group B, did not advance in 2013
Kyrgyzstan	Host, did not participate in 2013

=== Standings ===
Pos	Team	Pld	W	OTW	OTL	L	GF	GA	GD	Pts
1	Kyrgyzstan	3	3	0	0	0	15	6	+9	9
2	Singapore	3	2	0	0	1	11	9	+2	6
3	Macau	3	1	0	0	2	14	5	+9	3
4	India	3	0	0	0	3	4	24	−20	0

Source: IIHF

All times local. (UTC+06:00)

24 February 2014; 16:00	Macau	12–0 (2–0, 5–0, 5–0)	India	Gorodskoi Katok; Attendance: 107

Game reference
Te Lin Chu; Chan Wa Tong	Goalies	Sonam Gurmat; Paldan Namtak
75	Shots	20

24 February 2014; 19:00	Kyrgyzstan	6–3 (3–1, 1–1, 2–1)	Singapore	Gorodskoi Katok; Attendance: 403

Game reference
Elzar Bolotbekov; Adilet Zhyrgalbek Uulu	Goalies	Chin Ming Kenny Liang; Boon Han Kwek
68	Shots	50

26 February 2014; 16:00	Singapore	2–1 (0–0, 0–0, 2–1)	Macau	Gorodskoi Katok; Attendance: 87

Game reference
Chin Ming Kenny Liang	Goalies	Te Lin Chu; Chan Wa Tong
42	Shots	52

26 February 2014; 19:00	India	2–6 (0–1, 1–2, 1–3)	Kyrgyzstan	Gorodskoi Katok; Attendance: 427

Game reference
Sonam Gurmat	Goalies	Elzar Bolotbekov; Adilet Zhyrgalbek Uulu
36	Shots	53

27 February 2014; 16:00	Singapore	6–2 (1–0, 0–1, 5–1)	India	Gorodskoi Katok; Attendance: 88

Game reference
Chin Ming Kenny Liang; Boon Han Kwek	Goalies	Sonam Gurmat
65	Shots	42

27 February 2014; 19:00	Kyrgyzstan	3–1 (1–1, 2–0, 0–0)	Macau	Gorodskoi Katok; Attendance: 412

Game reference
Elzar Bolotbekov	Goalies	Te Lin Chu
53	Shots	61

== Playoff round ==
Bracket

Semi-finals
A1	Kyrgyzstan	16
A4	India	2
A2	Singapore	1
A3	Macau^{‡}	2

Gold medal game
WSF1	Kyrgyzstan	4
WSF2	Macau	5
Bronze medal game
LSF1	Singapore	5
LSF2	India	3

† Indicates overtime win
‡ Indicates shootout win

=== Semi-finals ===
All times local. (UTC+06:00)

1 March 2014; 16:00	Kyrgyzstan	16–2 (6–1, 5–1, 5–0)	India	Gorodskoi Katok; Attendance: 385

Game reference
Elzar Bolotbekov; Adilet Zhyrgalbek Uulu	Goalies	Sonam Gurmat; Paldan Namtak
108	Shots	25

1 March 2014; 19:00	Singapore	1 – 2 (SO) (0–0, 0–1, 1–0, 0–0, 0–1)	Macau	Gorodskoi Katok; Attendance: 214

Game reference
Chin Ming Kenny Liang	Goalies	Te Lin Chu
39	Shots	73

=== Bronze medal game ===
Time is local. (UTC+06:00)

2 March 2014; 12:00	Singapore	5–3 (1–1, 2–0, 2–2)	India	Gorodskoi Katok

Game reference

=== Gold medal game ===
Time is local. (UTC+06:00)

2 March 2014; 15:00	Kyrgyzstan	4–5 (0–1, 4–3, 0–1)	Macau	Gorodskoi Katok

Game reference

== Ranking and statistics ==
=== Final standings ===
Rk	Team	Result
1st place, gold medalist(s)	Macau	Promoted to Top Division 2015
2nd place, silver medalist(s)	Kyrgyzstan	
3rd place, bronze medalist(s)	Singapore	
4	India	

=== Leading scorers ===
Rankings based upon points, and sorted by goals.

Team	Player	GP	G	A	Pts	PIM	+/−
Kyrgyzstan	Kanaibek Omurbekov	4	6	2	8	0	+10
Singapore	Wee Daniel Chew	4	5	3	8	24	+6
Kyrgyzstan	Salamat Tynaliev	4	4	4	8	14	+10
Kyrgyzstan	Sultanbek Tokoyev	4	5	1	6	0	+8
Macau	Hou Kan Kam	4	4	2	6	26	+4
Macau	Ka Kit Pong	4	3	2	5	2	+4
Kyrgyzstan	Urmat Sheishenaliev	4	2	3	5	4	+9
Kyrgyzstan	Yevgeni Vikulov	4	2	2	4	0	+8
Kyrgyzstan	Uran Tursunbekov	4	1	3	4	0	+6
Kyrgyzstan	Adilet Zhookayev	4	1	3	4	12	+11

=== Leading goaltenders ===
Goalkeepers with 40% or more of their team's total minutes, ranked by save percentage.

Team	Goaltender	Minutes	GA	GAA	SV%	Saves	SO
Kyrgyzstan	Elzar Bolotbekov	175:20	5	1.71	.962	125	0
Macau	Te Lin Chu	229:19	6	1.57	.960	143	0
Singapore	Chin Ming Kenny Liang	225:20	10	2.66	.952	196	0
India	Sonam Gurmat	193:21	29	9.00	.872	197	0
