= 2022 Men's Ice Hockey World Championships =

International ice hockey tournament

The 2022 Men's Ice Hockey World Championships was the 85th such event hosted by the International Ice Hockey Federation (IIHF). Teams were participating in several levels of competition. The competition also served as qualifications for division placements in the 2023 competition.

Due to the ongoing COVID-19 pandemic, only teams in the Championship division had participated in 2021, so the standard system of promotion and relegation between divisions and groups was not implemented; for 2022, each team remained at the level they had been assigned for the 2021 competition (due to the pandemic, this was actually a carry-over of the outcome of the 2019 competition).

On February 28, 2022, the IIHF suspended Top Division teams Russia and Belarus from the tournament due to the 2022 Russian invasion of Ukraine and replaced them with Division I sides France and Austria. As a result, multiple teams in lower divisions were promoted to fill vacancies.

== Championship (Top Division) ==
The tournament was played in Tampere and Helsinki, Finland from 13 to 29 May 2022.

=== Group A ===
Pos	Team	Pld	W	OTW	OTL	L	GF	GA	GD	Pts	Qualification or relegation
1	Switzerland	7	6	1	0	0	34	15	+19	20	Quarterfinals
2	Germany	7	5	0	1	1	26	20	+6	16	Quarterfinals
3	Canada	7	5	0	0	2	34	18	+16	15	Quarterfinals
4	Slovakia	7	4	0	0	3	23	19	+4	12 (Note: Slovakia 7–1 Denmark)	Quarterfinals
5	Denmark	7	4	0	0	3	18	18	0	12	
6	France	7	1	1	0	5	11	24	−13	5	
7	Kazakhstan	7	1	0	0	6	19	31	−12	3	
8	Italy (R)	7	0	0	1	6	12	32	−20	1	Relegation to 2023 Division I A

Source: IIHF
Rules for classification: 1) points; 2) head-to-head points; 3) head-to-head goal difference; 4) head-to-head number of goals scored; 5) result against closest best-ranked team outside tied teams; 6) result against second-best ranked team outside tied teams; 7) seeding before tournament.
(R) Relegated

=== Group B ===
Pos	Team	Pld	W	OTW	OTL	L	GF	GA	GD	Pts	Qualification or relegation
1	Finland (H)	7	6	0	1	0	25	5	+20	19	Quarterfinals
2	Sweden	7	5	1	1	0	27	10	+17	18	Quarterfinals
3	Czechia	7	4	0	1	2	19	13	+6	13 (Note: United States 0–1 Czechia)	Quarterfinals
4	United States	7	3	2	0	2	18	12	+6	13	Quarterfinals
5	Latvia	7	2	1	0	4	14	20	−6	8	
6	Austria	7	1	1	2	3	16	22	−6	7	
7	Norway	7	1	1	0	5	15	29	−14	5	
8	Great Britain (R)	7	0	0	1	6	10	33	−23	1	Relegation to 2023 Division I A

Source: IIHF
Rules for classification: 1) points; 2) head-to-head points; 3) head-to-head goal difference; 4) head-to-head number of goals scored; 5) result against closest best-ranked team outside tied teams; 6) result against second-best ranked team outside tied teams; 7) seeding before tournament.
(H) Host; (R) Relegated

=== Playoff round ===
Quarter-finals
26 May
1A Switzerland	0
4B United States	3
26 May
1B Finland	4
4A Slovakia	2
26 May
2A Germany	1
3B Czechia	4
26 May
2B Sweden	3
3A Canada (OT)	4

Semi-finals
28 May
2 Finland	4
7 United States	3
28 May
5 Canada	6
6 Czechia	1

Final
29 May
2 Finland (OT)	4
5 Canada	3
Third place
29 May
6 Czechia	8
7 United States	4

=== Final standings ===
Pos	Grp	Team	Pld	W	OTW	OTL	L	GF	GA	GD	Pts	Final result
1	B	Finland (H)	10	8	1	1	0	37	13	+24	27	Champions
2	A	Canada	10	6	1	1	2	47	26	+21	21	Runners-up
3	B	Czechia	10	6	0	1	3	32	24	+8	19	Third place
4	B	United States	10	4	2	0	4	28	24	+4	16	Fourth place
5	A	Switzerland	8	6	1	0	1	34	18	+16	20	Eliminated in Quarter-finals
6	B	Sweden	8	5	1	2	0	30	14	+16	19	Eliminated in Quarter-finals
7	A	Germany	8	5	0	1	2	27	24	+3	16	Eliminated in Quarter-finals
8	A	Slovakia	8	4	0	0	4	25	23	+2	12	Eliminated in Quarter-finals
9	A	Denmark	7	4	0	0	3	18	18	0	12	Eliminated in Group stage
10	B	Latvia	7	2	1	0	4	14	20	−6	8	Eliminated in Group stage
11	B	Austria	7	1	1	2	3	16	22	−6	7	Eliminated in Group stage
12	A	France	7	1	1	0	5	11	24	−13	5	Eliminated in Group stage
13	B	Norway	7	1	1	0	5	15	29	−14	5	Eliminated in Group stage
14	A	Kazakhstan	7	1	0	0	6	19	31	−12	3	Eliminated in Group stage
15	A	Italy	7	0	0	1	6	12	32	−20	1	2023 IIHF World Championship Division I
16	B	Great Britain	7	0	0	1	6	10	33	−23	1	2023 IIHF World Championship Division I

Source: IIHF
Rules for classification: 1) position in the group; 2) number of points; 3) goal difference; 4) goals scored; 5) seeding before tournament.
(H) Host

== Division I ==
=== Group A ===
The tournament was played in Ljubljana, Slovenia, from 3 to 8 May 2022.

Pos	Team	Pld	W	OTW	OTL	L	GF	GA	GD	Pts	Promotion
1	Slovenia (H, P)	4	4	0	0	0	22	5	+17	12	Promoted to the 2023 Top Division
2	Hungary (P)	4	3	0	0	1	12	9	+3	9	Promoted to the 2023 Top Division
3	Lithuania	4	2	0	0	2	13	13	0	6	
4	South Korea	4	1	0	0	3	9	15	−6	3	
5	Romania	4	0	0	0	4	8	22	−14	0	

Source: IIHF
Rules for classification: 1) points; 2) head-to-head points; 3) head-to-head goal difference; 4) head-to-head number of goals scored; 5) result against closest best-ranked team outside tied teams; 6) result against second-best ranked team outside tied teams; 7) seeding before tournament.
(H) Host; (P) Promoted

=== Group B ===
The tournament was played in Tychy, Poland, from 26 April to 1 May 2022.

Pos	Team	Pld	W	OTW	OTL	L	GF	GA	GD	Pts	Promotion
1	Poland (H, P)	4	3	1	0	0	18	4	+14	11	Promoted to the 2023 Division I A
2	Japan	4	3	0	0	1	23	9	+14	9	
3	Ukraine	4	2	0	1	1	19	11	+8	7	
4	Estonia	4	1	0	0	3	9	20	−11	3	
5	Serbia	4	0	0	0	4	4	29	−25	0	

Source: IIHF
Rules for classification: 1) points; 2) head-to-head points; 3) head-to-head goal difference; 4) head-to-head number of goals scored; 5) result against closest best-ranked team outside tied teams; 6) result against second-best ranked team outside tied teams; 7) seeding before tournament.
(H) Host; (P) Promoted

== Division II ==
=== Group A ===
The tournament was played in Zagreb, Croatia, from 25 to 30 April 2022.

Pos	Team	Pld	W	OTW	OTL	L	GF	GA	GD	Pts	Promotion or relegation
1	China (P)	4	4	0	0	0	28	4	+24	12	Promoted to the 2023 Division I B
2	Netherlands (P)	4	3	0	0	1	19	10	+9	9	Promoted to the 2023 Division I B
3	Croatia (H)	4	1	1	0	2	9	12	−3	5	
4	Spain	4	1	0	1	2	10	12	−2	4	
5	Israel	4	0	0	0	4	4	32	−28	0	
6	Australia (Note: Australia withdrew their team on 22 January 2022 because of the COVID-19 pandemic.)	0	0	0	0	0	0	0	0	0	Withdrawn

Source: IIHF
Rules for classification: 1) points; 2) head-to-head points; 3) head-to-head goal difference; 4) head-to-head number of goals scored; 5) result against closest best-ranked team outside tied teams; 6) result against second-best ranked team outside tied teams; 7) seeding before tournament.
(H) Host; (P) Promoted

=== Group B ===
The tournament was played in Reykjavík, Iceland, from 18 to 23 April 2022.

Pos	Team	Pld	W	OTW	OTL	L	GF	GA	GD	Pts	Promotion or relegation
1	Iceland (H, P)	4	4	0	0	0	25	7	+18	12	Promoted to the 2023 Division II A
2	Georgia (P)	4	3	0	0	1	21	11	+10	9	Promoted to the 2023 Division II A
3	Belgium	4	2	0	0	2	22	8	+14	6	
4	Bulgaria	4	1	0	0	3	11	33	−22	3	
5	Mexico	4	0	0	0	4	4	24	−20	0	
6	New Zealand (Note: New Zealand withdrew their team on 2 February 2022 due to the COVID-19 pandemic.)	0	0	0	0	0	0	0	0	0	Withdrawn

Source: IIHF
Rules for classification: 1) points; 2) head-to-head points; 3) head-to-head goal difference; 4) head-to-head number of goals scored; 5) result against closest best-ranked team outside tied teams; 6) result against second-best ranked team outside tied teams; 7) seeding before tournament.
(H) Host; (P) Promoted

== Division III ==
=== Group A ===
The tournament was played in Kockelscheuer, Luxembourg, from 3 to 8 April 2022.

Pos	Team	Pld	W	OTW	OTL	L	GF	GA	GD	Pts	Promotion or relegation
1	United Arab Emirates (P)	4	4	0	0	0	41	11	+30	12	Promoted to the 2023 Division II B
2	Turkey (P)	4	3	0	0	1	23	22	+1	9	Promoted to the 2023 Division II B
3	Turkmenistan	4	1	0	1	2	17	23	−6	4	
4	Chinese Taipei	4	1	0	0	3	11	23	−12	3	
5	Luxembourg (H)	4	0	1	0	3	11	24	−13	2	
6	North Korea (Note: North Korea withdrew their team on 3 February 2022 because of the COVID-19 pandemic and the travel restrictions.)	0	0	0	0	0	0	0	0	0	Withdrawn

Source: IIHF
Rules for classification: 1) points; 2) head-to-head points; 3) head-to-head goal difference; 4) head-to-head number of goals scored; 5) result against closest best-ranked team outside tied teams; 6) result against second-best ranked team outside tied teams; 7) seeding before tournament.
(H) Host; (P) Promoted

=== Group B ===
The tournament was played in Cape Town, South Africa, from 13 to 18 March 2022.

Pos	Team	Pld	W	OTW	OTL	L	GF	GA	GD	Pts	Promotion or relegation
1	South Africa (H, P)	4	3	0	1	0	24	13	+11	10	Promoted to the 2023 Division III A
2	Thailand (P)	4	2	1	0	1	20	17	+3	8	Promoted to the 2023 Division III A
3	Bosnia and Herzegovina	4	0	0	0	4	12	26	−14	0	
4	Hong Kong (Note: Hong Kong withdrew their team on 14 February 2022 because of the COVID-19 pandemic.)	0	0	0	0	0	0	0	0	0	Withdrawn

Source: IIHF
Rules for classification: 1) points; 2) head-to-head points; 3) head-to-head goal difference; 4) head-to-head number of goals scored; 5) result against closest best-ranked team outside tied teams; 6) result against second-best ranked team outside tied teams; 7) seeding before tournament.
(H) Host; (P) Promoted

== Division IV ==
The tournament was played in Bishkek, Kyrgyzstan, from 3 to 8 March 2022.

Pos	Team	Pld	W	OTW	OTL	L	GF	GA	GD	Pts	Promotion
1	Kyrgyzstan (H, P)	4	4	0	0	0	64	2	+62	12	Promoted to the 2023 Division III B
2	Iran (P)	4	3	0	0	1	22	20	+2	9	Promoted to the 2023 Division III B
3	Singapore (P)	4	2	0	0	2	14	22	−8	6	Promoted to the 2023 Division III B
4	Malaysia (P)	4	1	0	0	3	11	39	−28	3	Promoted to the 2023 Division III B
5	Kuwait	4	0	0	0	4	4	32	−28	0	
6	Philippines (Note: The Philippines withdrew their team on 13 December 2021 because of the COVID-19 pandemic, as they were unable to practice as the ice rinks were closed.)	0	0	0	0	0	0	0	0	0	Withdrawn

Source: IIHF
Rules for classification: 1) points; 2) head-to-head points; 3) head-to-head goal difference; 4) head-to-head number of goals scored; 5) result against closest best-ranked team outside tied teams; 6) result against second-best ranked team outside tied teams; 7) seeding before tournament.
(H) Host; (P) Promoted
