= 2023 IIHF World Championship Division III =

International ice hockey tournament

Tournament details
- Host countries: South Africa; Bosnia and Herzegovina
- Venues: 2 (in 2 host cities)
- Dates: 17–23 April; 27 February – 5 March
- Teams: 12

The 2023 IIHF World Championship Division III were two international ice hockey tournaments run by the International Ice Hockey Federation.

The Group A tournament was held in Cape Town, South Africa from 17 to 23 April and the Group B tournament in Sarajevo, Bosnia and Herzegovina from 27 February to 5 March 2023.

Chinese Taipei were promoted after winning Group A, with North Korea relegated after withdrawing before the tournament. Kyrgyzstan won the Group B tournament and got promoted, while Malaysia got relegated.

== Group A tournament ==
2023 IIHF World Championship Division III A

Tournament details
- Host country: South Africa
- Venue: 1 (in 1 host city)
- Dates: 17–23 April
- Teams: 5

Tournament statistics
- Games played: 10
- Goals scored: 86 (8.6 per game)
- Attendance: 1,815 (182 per game)
- Scoring leader: (Thailand) Jan Isaksson (11 points)

Official website
- Website

=== Participants ===
Team	Qualification
Turkmenistan	Placed 3rd in Division III last edition.
Chinese Taipei	Placed 4th in Division III last edition.
Luxembourg	Placed 5th in Division III last edition.
~~North Korea~~	Withdrew last edition and withdrew also this edition.
South Africa	Host, placed 1st in Division III B last edition and was promoted.
Thailand	Placed 2nd in Division III B last edition and was promoted.

=== Match officials ===
Four referees and seven linesmen were selected for the tournament.

Referees	Linesmen
(Italy) Andrea Benvegnu; (New Zealand) Ryan Cairns; (Turkey) Cemal Kaya; (United Arab Emirates) Yahya Al-Jneibi	(Australia) Fraser Ohlson; (Czech Republic) Miroslav Lhotský; (Mexico) Óscar Pérez; (Netherlands) Koep Leermakers; (New Zealand) Edward Howard; (South Africa) Jason van Rooyen; (United Arab Emirates) Helan Al-Ameri

=== Standings ===
Pos	Team	Pld	W	OTW	OTL	L	GF	GA	GD	Pts	Promotion or relegation
1	Chinese Taipei	4	4	0	0	0	30	4	+26	12	Promoted to the 2024 Division II B
2	Turkmenistan	4	2	0	0	2	17	16	+1	6 (Note: Turkmenistan 3 points, 0 GD, 12 GS; South Africa 3 points, 0 GD, 11 GS; Thailand 3 points, 0 GD, 8 GS)	
3	South Africa (H)	4	2	0	0	2	16	17	−1	6	
4	Thailand	4	2	0	0	2	20	21	−1	6	
5	Luxembourg	4	0	0	0	4	3	28	−25	0	
6	North Korea (Note: North Korea withdrew before the tournament.)	0	0	0	0	0	0	0	0	0	Relegated to the 2024 Division III B

Source: IIHF
Rules for classification: 1) points; 2) head-to-head points; 3) head-to-head goal difference; 4) head-to-head number of goals scored; 5) result against closest best-ranked team outside tied teams; 6) result against second-best ranked team outside tied teams; 7) seeding before tournament.
(H) Host

=== Results ===
All times are local (UTC+2)

17 April 2023; 16:00	Thailand	2–11 (0–3, 1–3, 1–5)	Chinese Taipei	The Ice Station, Cape Town; Attendance: 30

Game reference

Benjamin Kleineschay
Pattarapol Ungkulpattanasuk
Goalies
Hsiao Po-yu
Kuei Fu-hsiang
Referee:
(New Zealand) Ryan Cairns
Linesmen:
(Australia) Fraser Ohlson
(Mexico) Óscar Pérez

	0–1	12:51 – Shen Yen-l. (Sang) (PP)
	0–2	14:35 – Chou
	0–3	18:29 – Lin H. (Shen Yen-l., Yang Chang-h.) (PP)
	0–4	25:05 – Yu
	0–5	26:24 – Chang (Shen Yen-c.)
Sukwiboon – 27:36	1–5
	1–6	36:21 – Lin H. (Chen, Sang) (PP)
	1–7	42:12 – Yu (Lin C., Chou)
	1–8	45:26 – Lin H. (Yang Chang-h.)
	1–9	48:36 – Lin H. (Chen, Shen Yen-l.) (PP)
Isaksson (Chan-Urai) (PP) – 49:33	2–9
	2–10	54:48 – Wang (Shih)
	2–11	55:54 – Chang (Lin Y., Shen Yen-l.)

14 min
Penalties
6 min
23
Shots
44

17 April 2023; 20:00	Turkmenistan	6–9 (3–0, 0–4, 3–5)	South Africa	The Ice Station, Cape Town; Attendance: 187

Game reference

Rahman Myradov
Serdar Ashyrov
Goalies
Ryan Boyd
Referee:
(Italy) Andrea Benvegnu
Linesmen:
(United Arab Emirates) Helan Al-Ameri
(Netherlands) Koep Leermakers

Dovletmyradov (Barkovskiy) – 01:02	1–0
Barkovskiy (Annasaparov, Dovletmyradov) (PP) – 08:26	2–0
Nuryyev (Baymyradov) – 10:57	3–0
	3–1	20:44 – Van Doesburgh (Compton)
	3–2	28:58 – Magmoed (PP)
	3–3	34:54 – Samaai (Valadas, Compton) (PP)
	3–4	35:49 – Venter (Valadas)
Kakayev – 40:28	4–4
	4–5	44:46 – Samaai (Kluyts) (PP)
	4–6	45:10 – Magmoed (Obery, Venter)
Geldimyradov (Barkovskiy, Annasaparov) – 51:43	5–6
	5–7	52:19 – Samaai (Valadas)
	5–8	53:06 – Van Doesburgh
Dovletmyradov (Geldimyradov, Tannyyev) (PP) – 55:53	6–8
	6–9	58:09 – Schuurman

14 min
Penalties
12 min
39
Shots
24

18 April 2023; 20:00	Luxembourg	2–10 (0–2, 1–5, 1–3)	Thailand	The Ice Station, Cape Town; Attendance: 51

Game reference

Philippe Lepage
Goalies
Benjamin Kleineschay
Referee:
(United Arab Emirates) Yahya Al-Jneibi
Linesmen:
(Czech Republic) Miroslav Lhotský
(South Africa) Jason van Rooyen

	0–1	04:45 – Limpinphet (Khuhakaew, Forstner) (PP)
	0–2	12:18 – Isaksson (Kindborn, Aarola) (PP)
	0–3	22:35 – Isaksson (Kindborn, Nagayama) (PP)
	0–4	25:18 – Kitayama (Isaksson, Aarola) (PP)
Grönlund (PP) – 32:57	1–4
	1–5	33:22 – Nagayama (Forstner, Kindborn)
	1–6	34:51 – Isaksson (Kindborn, Aarola)
	1–7	35:04 – Khuhakaew (Limpinphet, Nagayama)
	1–8	46:23 – Kitayama (Kindborn, Isaksson) (PP)
	1–9	48:05 – Kitayama (Kindborn, Nagayama) (PP)
	1–10	49:35 – Sukwiboon (Vatanapanyakul)
Cannon (Potucek, Mossong) – 53:56	2–10

20 min
Penalties
14 min
30
Shots
54

19 April 2023; 16:00	Luxembourg	1–4 (0–1, 1–3, 0–0)	Turkmenistan	The Ice Station, Cape Town; Attendance: 40

Game reference

Philippe Lepage
Goalies
Rahman Myradov
Referee:
(Turkey) Cemal Kaya
Linesmen:
(New Zealand) Edward Howard
(Australia) Fraser Ohlson

	0–1	08:25 – Nuryyev (Bayhanov, Tannyyev) (PP)
	0–2	28:31 – Barkovskiy (Geldimyradov, Annasaparov)
	0–3	31:12 – Geldimyradov (Aganiyazov, Barkovskiy) (PP)
Cannon – 32:57	1–3
	1–4	37:22 – Hydyrov (Gurbanov, Vahovskiy) (PP)

37 min
Penalties
14 min
14
Shots
36

19 April 2023; 20:00	Chinese Taipei	6–1 (0–0, 3–1, 3–0)	South Africa	The Ice Station, Cape Town; Attendance: 300

Game reference

Hsiao Po-yu
Goalies
Ryan Boyd
Alistair Bywater
Referee:
(New Zealand) Ryan Cairns
Linesmen:
(United Arab Emirates) Helan Al-Ameri
(Czech Republic) Miroslav Lhotský

Lin Y. (Shen Yen-c., Wen) – 21:44	1–0
Yang Chang-h. (Lin H., Shen Yen-l.) (PP) – 36:36	2–0
	2–1	37:50 – Samaai (Birrell)
Yang Chang-h. (Shen Yen-l, Sang) – 39:25	3–1
Lin H. (Chen, Yang Chang-h.) (PP) – 48:55	4–1
Pan – 49:11	5–1
Lin H. (Chen) – 50:46	6–1

8 min
Penalties
17 min
38
Shots
21

20 April 2023; 20:00	Thailand	3–6 (0–0, 0–3, 3–3)	Turkmenistan	The Ice Station, Cape Town; Attendance: 30

Game reference

Benjamin Kleineschay
Goalies
Rahman Myradov
Referee:
(Italy) Andrea Benvegnu
Linesmen:
(United Arab Emirates) Helan Al-Ameri
(Mexico) Óscar Pérez

	0–1	24:00 – Geldimyradov (Barkovskiy, Aganiyazov) (PP2)
	0–2	25:16 – Esenov (Vahovskiy, Gurbanov) (PP)
	0–3	29:59 – Nuryyev (Tannyyev)
	0–4	41:02 – Bayhanov (Barkovskiy)
Thanakroekkiat (Nagayama, Aarola) (PP) – 47:38	1–4
	1–5	49:54 – Baymyradov
Isaksson (Kindborn, Forstner) – 53:51	2–5
Isaksson (Aarola) – 56:44	3–5
	3–6	59:32 – Baymyradov (EN)

6 min
Penalties
10 min
35
Shots
44

21 April 2023; 16:00	Chinese Taipei	10–0 (6–0, 2–0, 2–0)	Luxembourg	The Ice Station, Cape Town; Attendance: 27

Game reference

Kuei Fu-hsiang
Goalies
Philippe Lepage
Sven Oberweis
Referee:
(United Arab Emirates) Yahya Al-Jneibi
Linesmen:
(Netherlands) Koep Leermakers
(South Africa) Jason van Rooyen

Chou (Yu) – 02:23	1–0
Lin Y. (Wen) (PP) – 04:38	2–0
Yang Chang-h. (Chen, Lin H.) – 07:20	3–0
Shen Yen-c. (Wen, Lin Y.) – 07:35	4–0
Yang Chang-h. (Lin H.) – 09:44	5–0
Shen Yen-l. (Chen, Lin H.) (PP) – 14:39	6–0
Shen Yen-c. (Yu, Lin Y.) – 24:03	7–0
Lin J. (Yu, Chou) – 34:27	8–0
Lin J. (Yang Chang-l., Lin C.) (PP) – 48:25	9–0
Lin J. (Yang Chang-l.) – 52:51	10–0

6 min
Penalties
10 min
44
Shots
24

21 April 2023; 20:00	South Africa	2–5 (1–2, 1–1, 0–2)	Thailand	The Ice Station, Cape Town

Game reference

Ryan Boyd
Goalies
Benjamin Kleineschay
Referee:
(New Zealand) Ryan Cairns
Linesmen:
(New Zealand) Edward Howard
(Australia) Fraser Ohlson

	0–1	06:21 – Isaksson (Forstner, Nagayama)
	0–2	09:40 – Isaksson (Forstner)
Carelse (Van Doesburgh) (SH) – 15:36	1–2
	1–3	27:17 – Isaksson (Aarola, Kindborn) (PP)
Giot (Venter, Van Doesburgh) – 37:36	2–3
	2–4	42:56 – Kindborn (Nagayama, Aarola)
	2–5	48:17 – Khuhakaew (Forstner, Kindborn) (PP)

18 min
Penalties
8 min
39
Shots
36

23 April 2023; 14:00	Turkmenistan	1–3 (0–0, 0–2, 1–1)	Chinese Taipei	The Ice Station, Cape Town; Attendance: 150

Game reference

Rahman Myradov
Goalies
Hsiao Po-yu
Referee:
(Italy) Andrea Benvegnu
Linesmen:
(Czech Republic) Miroslav Lhotský
(Mexico) Óscar Pérez

	0–1	32:33 – Chen (Lin C.)
	0–2	33:06 – Wen (Lin Y., Shen Yen-c.)
	0–3	51:13 – Yang Chang-h. (Shen Yen-l., Lin H.)
Aganiyazov (Dovletmyradov) – 59:56	1–3

18 min
Penalties
12 min
32
Shots
45

23 April 2023; 18:00	South Africa	4–0 (1–0, 2–0, 1–0)	Luxembourg	The Ice Station, Cape Town; Attendance: 1,000

Game reference

Ryan Boyd
Goalies
Philippe Lepage
Referee:
(Turkey) Cemal Kaya
Linesmen:
(New Zealand) Edward Howard
(Netherlands) Koep Leermakers

Magmoed (Giot, Saaiman) – 11:07	1–0
Schuurman (Venter, Carelse) – 31:37	2–0
Carelse (Samaai) – 37:47	3–0
Magmoed (Venter) – 47:38	4–0

4 min
Penalties
6 min
36
Shots
14

=== Statistics ===
==== Scoring leaders ====
List shows the top skaters sorted by points, then goals.

Player	GP	G	A	Pts	+/−	PIM	POS
(Thailand) Jan Isaksson	4	9	2	11	+4	4	F
(Chinese Taipei) Lin Hung-ju	4	6	5	11	+7	0	F
(Thailand) Ken Kindborn	4	1	9	10	+1	12	D
(Chinese Taipei) Yang Chang-hsing	4	5	3	8	+7	0	F
(Turkmenistan) Pavel Barkovskiy	4	2	5	7	+1	2	F
(Chinese Taipei) Shen Yen-lin	4	2	5	7	+6	4	D
(Chinese Taipei) Chen Kuan-ting	4	1	6	7	+7	2	F
(Thailand) Hideki Nagayama	4	1	6	7	+1	4	D
(Thailand) Kim Aarola	4	0	7	7	+1	2	F
(Chinese Taipei) Lin Yo-chen	4	2	4	6	+1	4	F
(Chinese Taipei) Shen Yen-chin	4	2	4	6	+6	2	F

GP = Games played; G = Goals; A = Assists; Pts = Points; +/− = Plus/Minus; PIM = Penalties in Minutes; POS = Position
Source: IIHF.com

==== Goaltending leaders ====
Only the top five goaltenders, based on save percentage, who have played at least 40% of their team's minutes, are included in this list.

Player	TOI	GA	GAA	SA	Sv%	SO
(Chinese Taipei) Hsiao Po-yu	168:36	3	1.07	73	95.89	0
(Thailand) Benjamin Kleineschay	223:08	17	4.57	141	87.94	0
(Turkmenistan) Rahman Myradov	233:06	15	3.86	116	87.07	0
(South Africa) Ryan Boyd	230:46	17	4.42	123	86.18	1
(Luxembourg) Philippe Lepage	220:00	26	7.09	156	83.33	0

TOI = time on ice (minutes:seconds); SA = shots against; GA = goals against; GAA = goals against average; Sv% = save percentage; SO = shutouts
Source: IIHF.com

=== Awards ===
Position	Player
Goaltender	(Chinese Taipei) Hsiao Po-yu
Defenceman	(Thailand) Ken Kindborn
Forward	(Thailand) Jan Isaksson

== Group B tournament ==
2023 IIHF World Championship Division III B

Tournament details
- Host country: Bosnia and Herzegovina
- Venue: 1 (in 1 host city)
- Dates: 27 February – 5 March
- Teams: 6

Tournament statistics
- Games played: 15
- Goals scored: 212 (14.13 per game)
- Attendance: 4,585 (306 per game)
- Scoring leader: (Kyrgyzstan) Mamed Seifulov (28 points)

Official website
- Website

=== Participants ===
Team	Qualification
Bosnia and Herzegovina	Host, placed 3rd in Division III Q last edition.
Kyrgyzstan	Placed 1st in Division IV last edition and was promoted.
Iran	Placed 2nd in Division IV last edition and was promoted.
Singapore	Placed 3rd in Division IV last edition and was promoted.
Malaysia	Placed 4th in Division IV last edition and was promoted.
Hong Kong	Withdrew last edition.

=== Match officials ===
Four referees and seven linesmen were selected for the tournament.

Referees	Linesmen
(Lithuania) Vitalijus Sevruk; (South Korea) Park Jae-hyung; (Sweden) Robert Hallin; (Switzerland) Phillip Ströbel	(Chinese Taipei) Huang Jen-hung; (Croatia) Tomislav Grozaj; (Croatia) Marko Saković; (Czech Republic) Jiří Svoboda; (Serbia) David Perduv; (Slovakia) Lukáš Kacej; (Spain) Alejandro García

=== Standings ===
Pos	Team	Pld	W	OTW	OTL	L	GF	GA	GD	Pts	Promotion or relegation
1	Kyrgyzstan	5	5	0	0	0	76	5	+71	15	Promoted to the 2024 Division III A
2	Bosnia and Herzegovina (H)	5	3	1	0	1	39	20	+19	11	
3	Hong Kong	5	2	1	1	1	41	26	+15	9	
4	Singapore	5	2	0	1	2	31	31	0	7	
5	Iran	5	1	0	0	4	19	53	−34	3	
6	Malaysia	5	0	0	0	5	6	77	−71	0	Relegated to the 2024 Division IV

Source: IIHF
Rules for classification: 1) points; 2) head-to-head points; 3) head-to-head goal difference; 4) head-to-head number of goals scored; 5) result against closest best-ranked team outside tied teams; 6) result against second-best ranked team outside tied teams; 7) seeding before tournament.
(H) Host

=== Results ===
All times are local (UTC+1)

27 February 2023; 13:00	Kyrgyzstan	14–2 (7–1, 5–1, 2–0)	Singapore	Skenderija, Sarajevo; Attendance: 69

Game reference

Alexander Petrov
Arslan Maraimbekov
Goalies
Joshua Shao Ern Lee
Liam Blakney
Referee:
(Sweden) Robert Hallin.
Linesmen:
(Spain) Alejandro García
(Czech Republic) Jiří Svoboda

Egorov – 05:23	1–0
Seifulov – 10.17	2–0
Tonkikh – 10:23	3–0
Seifulov (Abdyraev, Titov) (PP) – 11:02	4–0
Nosov (Chuvalov, Tonkikh) – 16:25	5–0
Chuvalov (Nosov) – 17:40	6–0
	6–1	17:56 – Wong (Chan)
Kashaev – 19:45	7–1
Titov (Abdyraev, Seifulov) – 21:35	8–1
Isamatov (Abdyraev) (PP) – 22:08	9–1
Nosov (Tonkikh) (SH) – 22:56	10–1
	10–2	29:24 – Chan
Kudashev (SH) – 36:23	11–2
Mirbekov (Isamatov, Kudashev) – 39:28	12–2
Tonkikh (Nosov, Chuvalov) – 44:24	13–2
Chuvalov (Isamatov) – 48:24	14–2

10 min
Penalties
8 min
59
Shots
7

27 February 2023; 16:30	Malaysia	4–14 (1–3, 0–7, 3–4)	Iran	Skenderija, Sarajevo; Attendance: 55

Game reference

Muhammad Azlly Tengku
Goalies
Oveis Hassanzadeh
Alireza Mahdavi
Referee:
(Switzerland) Phillip Ströbel
Linesmen:
(Croatia) Tomislav Grozaj
(Slovakia) Lukáš Kacej

	0–1	01:48 – Bahri
Aiman Zul (Mohammad) (PP) – 02:59	1–1
	1–2	04:30 – Houshidari (SH)
	1–3	06:18 – Heidari
	1–4	23:20 – Keyhanfar (Moghadasi)
	1–5	24:00 – Dehghani (Sheikhjafari)
	1–6	25:32 – Korehei (Ghorbani, Mehraban)
	1–7	27:04 – Keyhanfar (Ghahar, Moghadasi)
	1–8	28:13 – Keyhanfar (Ghahar, Heidari)
	1–9	31:01 – Moghadasi (Keyhanfar, Houshidari)
	1–10	35:29 – Moghadasi (Ghahar)
Mohd (D. Versluis, Aiman Zul) (PP) – 40:51	2–10
	2–11	42:34 – Houshidari (Moghadasi, Ghahar)
Muhd – 43:59	3–11
	3–12	47:27 – Korehei (Ghafoori, Bagheri)
Mohammad (D. Versluis, Mohd) – 48:59	4–12
	4–13	51:42 – Houshidari (SH2)
	4–14	53:58 – Bagheri (Korehei)

2 min
Penalties
16 min
19
Shots
45

27 February 2023; 20:00	Bosnia and Herzegovina	6–5 GWS (1–2, 2–3, 2–0) (OT: 0–0) (SO: 1–0)	Hong Kong	Skenderija, Sarajevo; Attendance: 800

Game reference

Dino Pašović
Goalies
Emerson Keung
Referee:
(Lithuania) Vitalijus Sevruk
Linesmen:
(Chinese Taipei) Huang Jen-hung
(Serbia) David Perduv

	0–1	03:33 – Cheng
	0–2	08:22 – L. Wong (Cheng)
Mlivić (Omer) – 19:40	1–2
Miskic (Jahjafendic) – 25:51	2–2
	2–3	29:11 – Tang (Chu, To)
	2–4	29:47 – Chu (Cheng)
T. Mrkva (Gaković) – 35:52	3–4
	3–5	37:10 – Cheng (L. Wong, Ngan)
Gaković (Omer) – 53:41	4–5
Mlivić (London, T. Mrkva) (EA) – 59:47	5–5

Mlivić (miss)
Gaković (miss)
Omer
H. Mrkva
London
Shootout
(miss) Chu
(miss) Chan
(miss) Tang
Ngan
0 min
Penalties
6 min
47
Shots
32

28 February 2023; 13:00	Singapore	10–0 (2–0, 5–0, 3–0)	Malaysia	Skenderija, Sarajevo; Attendance: 100

Game reference

Joshua Shao Ern Lee
Goalies
Muhammad Azily Tengku
Referee:
(South Korea) Park Jae-hyung
Linesmen:
(Chinese Taipei) Huang Jen-hung
(Croatia) Marko Saković

E. Redden (Kodrowski) – 00:08	1–0
Qian – 06:19	2–0
Wong – 20:29	3–0
Chan (E. Redden, Kodrowski) – 25:03	4–0
Chan (PP) – 34:47	5–0
E. Redden (Chua) (PP) – 38:35	6–0
E. Redden – 39:43	7–0
E. Redden (B. Lee, Kodrowski) – 48:58	8–0
Huang (Chan, Kodrowski) (PP) – 54:42	9–0
Chua (PS) – 59:55	10–0

8 min
Penalties
42 min
54
Shots
17

28 February 2023; 16:30	Hong Kong	11–1 (3–0, 5–0, 3–1)	Iran	Skenderija, Sarajevo; Attendance: 47

Game reference

Cheung Ching-ho
Goalies
Oveis Hassanzadeh
Alireza Mahdavi
Referee:
(Sweden) Robert Hallin
Linesmen:
(Serbia) David Perduv
(Czech Republic) Jiří Svoboda

Cheng (Wong K., Yam) (PP) – 13:21	1–0
Lo (Y. Wong, L. Wong) – 14:02	2–0
Lo (Cheng, Leung) (EA) – 17:07	3–0
Sham (Tang, Chau) – 26:40	4–0
To – 29:22	5–0
To (Chu, Cheng) – 31:01	6–0
Lo (Chan, Leung) – 32:27	7–0
Wong K. (Chu, Tang) (PP) – 35:48	8–0
Tang (Cheng, Wong K.) – 47:36	9–0
Chu (Wong K.) (PP) – 53:52	10–0
	10–1	58:17 – Mehraban
Ngan (Lee) – 58:51	11–1

4 min
Penalties
16 min
36
Shots
28

28 February 2023; 20:00	Kyrgyzstan	10–1 (3–0, 4–0, 3–1)	Bosnia and Herzegovina	Skenderija, Sarajevo; Attendance: 168

Game reference

Alexander Petrov
Goalies
Dino Pašović
Karim Ahmetovski
Referee:
(Switzerland) Phillip Ströbel
Linesmen:
(Croatia) Tomislav Grozaj
(Slovakia) Lukáš Kacej

Terentyev (Chuvalov, Egorov) – 10:15	1–0
Mirbekov (Kachkynbekov, Ismanov) – 13:54	2–0
Seifulov (Kudashev) (PP) – 16:12	3–0
Tonkikh (Nosov) – 27:28	4–0
Seifulov (Abdyraev) – 35:27	5–0
Ismanov (Mirbekov) – 35:53	6–0
Titov (Seifulov, Abdyraev) – 37:20	7–0
	7–1	43:17 – Omer (Mlivić, Alic) (PP)
Seifulov (Isamatov, Abdyraev) (PP) – 44:51	8–1
Egorov (Abdyraev, Titov) – 51:37	9–1
Titov (Isamatov) (SH) – 58:50	10–1

31 min
Penalties
10 min
76
Shots
13

2 March 2023; 13:00	Hong Kong	7–6 OT (1–2, 1–2, 4–2) (OT: 1–0)	Singapore	Skenderija, Sarajevo; Attendance: 101

Game reference

Emerson Keung
Goalies
Joshua Shao Ern Lee
Referee:
(Switzerland) Phillip Ströbel
Linesmen:
(Croatia) Tomislav Grozaj
(Slovakia) Lukáš Kacej

	0–1	07:44 – E. Redden (SH)
Cheng (Chu, Tang) (PP2) – 09:12	1–1
	1–2	13:59 – B. Lee (E. Redden, Qian)
	1–3	21:26 – O'Brien (Wong, Chan)
Cheng (Tang, Lee) (PP) – 29:40	2–3
	2–4	35:42 – Chan (E. Redden)
Sham (Chu) – 46:04	3–4
To (Ngan, Yam) – 48:54	4–4
	4–5	53:43 – Kodrowski (Qian, E. Redden)
Chan (Ngan, Chau) – 57:06	5–5
	5–6	57:37 – Chua (Wee, Chan) (PP)
Cheng (Sham) (EA) – 59:03	6–6
Chu (Cheng, Lee) – 60:29	7–6

6 min
Penalties
10 min
44
Shots
32

2 March 2023; 16:30	Kyrgyzstan	22–0 (7–0, 10–0, 5–0)	Malaysia	Skenderija, Sarajevo; Attendance: 87

Game reference

Arslan Maraimbekov
Goalies
Muhammad Azlly Tengku
Charles Tan
Referee:
(Lithuania) Vitalijus Sevruk
Linesmen:
(Serbia) David Perduv
(Czech Republic) Jiří Svoboda

Nosov (Terentyev, Chuvalov) – 02:21	1–0
Kudashev (Mirbekov, Seifulov) – 05:57	2–0
Seifulov (Ismanov, Kachkynbekov) – 06:57	3–0
Kachkynbekov (Seifulov, Fitisenko) – 08:43	4–0
Seifulov (Ismanov) – 10:25	5–0
Abdyraev (Terentyev, Egorov) – 12:12	6–0
Seifulov (Titov, Abdyraev) – 17:19	7–0
Seifulov (Abdyraev, Titov) – 20:57	8–0
Kachkynbekov (Fitisenko, Mirbekov) – 21:56	9–0
Fitisenko (Kachkynbekov, Ismanov) – 22:40	10–0
Kudashev (Bekmuratov, Kachkynbekov) – 23:02	11–0
Chuvalov (Tonkikh) – 25:14	12–0
Abdyraev (Titov) – 27:00	13–0
Shamyrkanov (Isamatov, Kudashev) – 28:41	14–0
Seifulov (Terentyev, Egorov) – 30:03	15–0
Titov (Seifulov, Egorov) – 34:50	16–0
Mirbekov (Tonkikh, Ismanov) – 39:47	17–0
Seifulov (Egorov, Terentyev) – 44:08	18–0
Bekmuratov (Kachkynbekov) – 45:31	19–0
Seifulov (Abdyraev, Kachkynbekov) – 48:10	20–0
Ismanov (Bekmuratov) – 50:58	21–0
Kudashev (Titov) – 52:21	22–0

0 min
Penalties
0 min
81
Shots
3

2 March 2023; 20:00	Bosnia and Herzegovina	9–2 (1–1, 3–1, 5–0)	Iran	Skenderija, Sarajevo; Attendance: 569

Game reference

Dino Pašović
Goalies
Oveis Hassanzadeh
Alireza Mahdavi
Referee:
(South Korea) Park Jae-hyung
Linesmen:
(Spain) Alejandro García
(Croatia) Marko Saković

Cordalija (Krehić, Ćatović) – 06:02	1–0
	1–1	09:44 – Keyhangar (Bagheri)
Cordalija (Omer, Mlivić) – 22:56	2–1
Omer (Mlivić) – 24:42	3–1
Gaković (Omer, Mlivić) (PP) – 28:36	4–1
	4–2	39:10 – Houshidari (PS)
Omer (Mlivić) – 40:56	5–2
Cordalija (SH) – 42:15	6–2
Mlivić – 44:44	7–2
T. Mrkva (Filipović) – 45:30	8–2
Omer (Mlivić) (PP) – 53:49	9–2

10 min
Penalties
8 min
48
Shots
34

3 March 2023; 13:00	Malaysia	1–16 (1–3, 0–6, 0–7)	Hong Kong	Skenderija, Sarajevo; Attendance: 57

Game reference

Muhammad Azlly Tengku
Charles Tan
Goalies
Cheung Ching-ho
Referee:
(Lithuania) Vitalijus Sevruk
Linesmen:
(Serbia) David Perduv
(Croatia) Marko Saković

	0–1	04:50 – Sham (Lo)
	0–2	08:17 – Lee (Chu, Y. Wong)
Mohammad (Mohd) – 09:41	1–2
	1–3	11:25 – Tang
	1–4	21:18 – Y. Wong (Lee) (PP)
	1–5	21:32 – Sham (To)
	1–6	27:36 – Lo (Lee, Cheng)
	1–7	33:06 – Sham (Y. Wong, Leung)
	1–8	36:53 – Chu (Cheng, Tang)
	1–9	38:48 – Chu
	1–10	42:08 – Cheng (Chu)
	1–11	49:33 – L. Wong (Cheng)
	1–12	51:05 – Chu (Cheng)
	1–13	52:32 – Sham (Kan)
	1–14	53:21 – Cheng
	1–15	54:47 – L. Wong
	1–16	59:03 – Chu

2 min
Penalties
4 min
17
Shots
41

3 March 2023; 16:30	Iran	0–18 (0–7, 0–4, 0–7)	Kyrgyzstan	Skenderija, Sarajevo; Attendance: 49

Game reference

Alireza Mahdavi
Oveis Hassanzadeh
Goalies
Alexander Petrov
Arslan Maraimbekov
Referee:
(South Korea) Park Jae-hyung
Linesmen:
(Spain) Alejandro García
(Slovakia) Lukáš Kacej

0–1	00:40 – Isamatov (Seifulov, Abdyraev)
0–2	01:53 – Egorov (Nosov, Mikhail Chuvalov)
0–3	02:32 – Egorov (Nososv, Chuvalov)
0–4	03:48 – Seifulov (Fitisenko)
0–5	07:29 – Titov (Abdyraev)
0–6	09:44 – Egorov (Isamatov)
0–7	16:38 – Ismanov (Mirbekov, Isamatov)
0–8	20:38 – Egorov
0–9	21:44 – Titov
0–10	24:31 – Chuvalov (Egorov)
0–11	32:58 – Seifulov (Adbyraev)
0–12	41:41 – Seifulov (Ismatov)
0–13	45:44 – Egorov (Isamatov)
0–14	50:37 – Seifulov (Nosov, Terentyev)
0–15	52:58 – Isamatov (Seifulov, Abdyraev)
0–16	53:18 – Mirbekov (Abdyraev)
0–17	55:10 – Terentyev (Bekmuratov) (PP)
0–18	56:07 – Titov (Abdyraev)

6 min
Penalties
0 min
7
Shots
51

3 March 2023; 20:00	Singapore	2–8 (0–2, 1–4, 1–2)	Bosnia and Herzegovina	Skenderija, Sarajevo; Attendance: 850

Game reference

Joshua Shao Ern Lee
Liam Blakney
Goalies
Dino Pašović
Referee:
(Switzerland) Phillip Ströbel
Linesmen:
(Croatia) Tomislav Grozaj
(Chinese Taipei) Huang Jen-hung

	0–1	06:16 – Miksic (Omer, Mlivić)
	0–2	06:38 – Gaković (T. Mrkva)
	0–3	26:03 – Mlivić (Omer, H. Mrkva) (SH)
	0–4	29:32 – Gaković (Filipović)
	0–5	32:09 – Omer (Mlivić, H. Mrkva) (PP)
	0–6	38:11 – Omer (Miksic, H. Mrkva)
E. Redden (N. Blakney, Huang) – 38:36	1–6
	1–7	50:20 – Gaković (Miksic) (SH)
	1–8	53:30 – London (Miksic, T. Mrkva)
Chan (E. Redden) (SH) – 59:26	2–8

10 min
Penalties
6 min
25
Shots
38

5 March 2023; 13:00	Iran	2–11 (1–5, 0–4, 1–2)	Singapore	Skenderija, Sarajevo; Attendance: 64

Game reference

Oveis Hassanzadeh
Alireza Mahdavi
Goalies
Joshua Shao Ern Lee
Liam Blakney
Referee:
(Switzerland) Phillip Ströbel
Linesmen:
(Croatia) Tomislav Grozaj
(Croatia) Marko Saković

	0–1	02:52 – Kodrowski (E. Redden, Qian) (PP)
	0–2	04:41 – B. Lee (E. Redden) (SH)
	0–3	05:12 – Chan (SH)
Ghorbani (Bahri, Ghafoori) – 06:12	1–3
	1–4	15:35 – Chan (Goh, Wong)
	1–5	18:18 – Chan (Goh)
	1–6	23:33 – Wong (Muthukumar, Chew)
	1–7	24:29 – E. Redden (Qian)
	1–8	34:50 – E. Redden (C. Redden)
	1–9	36:26 – Kodrowski
	1–10	45:03 – Qian (Chew, Chan) (PP)
Bagheri (Ghorbani) – 48:21	2–10
	2–11	55:04 – Chan (Qian, Chew) (PP)

8 min
Penalties
4 min
26
Shots
35

5 March 2023; 16:30	Hong Kong	2–12 (1–4, 1–4, 0–4)	Kyrgyzstan	Skenderija, Sarajevo; Attendance: 112

Game reference

Emerson Keung
Cheung Ching-ho
Goalies
Alexander Petrov
Arslan Maraimbekov
Referee:
(Lithuania) Vitalijus Sevruk
Linesmen:
(Serbia) David Perduv
(Czech Republic) Jiří Svoboda

	0–1	01:58 – Ismanov (Mirbekov)
	0–2	05:43 – Isamatov (Mirbekov, Ismanov)
	0–3	06:13 – Chuvalov
	0–4	14:14 – Titov (Seifulov, Kudashev)
Chu (Tang, Cheng) – 19:33	1–4
	1–5	29:18 – Titov (Isamatov)
	1–6	33:29 – Titov (Seifulov)
	1–7	33:52 – Ismanov (Kim, Mirbekov)
	1–8	35:48 – Abdyraev Titov, (Seifulov)
Chu (Cheng) – 38:22	2–8
	2–9	40:46 – Seifulov (Abdyraev)
	2–10	49:16 – Kim (Ismanov, Mirbekov)
	2–11	59:29 – Kashaev (Abdyraev)
	2–12	59:48 – Seifulov (Titov) (SH)

0 min
Penalties
8 min
9
Shots
59

5 March 2023; 20:00	Bosnia and Herzegovina	15–1 (5–1, 4–0, 6–0)	Malaysia	Skenderija, Sarajevo; Attendance: 1,457

Game reference

Dino Pašović
Karim Ahmetovski
Goalies
Muhammad Azlly Tengku
Referee:
(South Korea) Park Jae-hyung
Linesmen:
(Spain) Alejandro García
(Slovakia) Lukáš Kacej

	0–1	01:13 – M. Raja Amin
Omer (Ljevak) – 04:11	1–1
Omer (Mlivić) – 06:10	2–1
T. Mrkva (Gaković, Cordalija) (PP) – 07:04	3–1
Cordalija – 10:10	4–1
H. Mrkva (Omer) – 17:05	5–1
Omer (Mlivić) (PP) – 21:46	6–1
Jahjafendic (Alic, Cordalija) – 25:47	7–1
Miskic (Cordalija, H. Mrkva) – 33:54	8–1
Dinalić (Filipović, Alic) – 39:07	9–1
Mlivić – 40:24	10–1
Mlivić (Omer) (PP) – 42:21	11–1
Omer (Dinalić) – 47:22	12–1
Ćatović (Jahjafendic) – 52:30	13–1
Miskic (Omer, Mlivić) – 53:30	14–1
Omer (Dinalić) – 57:53	15–1

8 min
Penalties
8 min
47
Shots
19

=== Statistics ===
==== Scoring leaders ====
List shows the top skaters sorted by points, then goals.

Player	GP	G	A	Pts	+/−	PIM	POS
(Kyrgyzstan) Mamed Seifulov	5	18	10	28	+31	0	F
(Kyrgyzstan) Islambek Abdyraev	5	3	18	21	+27	0	F
(Bosnia and Herzegovina) Mirza Omer	5	11	9	20	+13	0	F
(Hong Kong) Justin Cheng	5	8	12	20	+15	2	F
(Kyrgyzstan) Alexander Titov	5	10	8	18	+24	0	F
(Bosnia and Herzegovina) Adnan Mlivić	5	6	11	17	+9	0	F
(Hong Kong) Ryan Chu	5	10	6	16	+11	2	F
(Singapore) Ethan Redden	5	8	7	15	+5	10	F
(Singapore) Joshua Chan	5	9	5	14	−1	2	F
(Kyrgyzstan) Ernazar Isamatov	5	4	10	14	+30	0	D

GP = Games played; G = Goals; A = Assists; Pts = Points; +/− = Plus/Minus; PIM = Penalties in Minutes; POS = Position
Source: IIHF.com

==== Goaltending leaders ====
Only the top five goaltenders, based on save percentage, who have played at least 40% of their team's minutes, are included in this list.

Player	TOI	GA	GAA	SA	Sv%	SO
(Kyrgyzstan) Arslan Maraimbekov	124:24	0	0.00	13	100.00	1
(Bosnia and Herzegovina) Dino Pašović	278:58	19	4.09	171	88.89	0
(Hong Kong) Cheung Ching-ho	150:42	9	3.58	78	88.46	0
(Hong Kong) Emerson Keung	153:58	16	6.24	104	84.62	0
(Singapore) Joshua Shao Ern Lee	230:57	24	6.24	144	83.33	1

TOI = time on ice (minutes:seconds); SA = shots against; GA = goals against; GAA = goals against average; Sv% = save percentage; SO = shutouts
Source: IIHF.com

=== Awards ===
Position	Player
Goaltender	(Bosnia and Herzegovina) Dino Pašović
Defenceman	(Kyrgyzstan) Ernazar Isamatov
Forward	(Hong Kong) Justin Cheng
