= 2024 IIHF World Championship Division III =

Ice hockey world championships

Tournament details
- Host countries: Kyrgyzstan; Bosnia and Herzegovina
- Venues: 2 (in 2 host cities)
- Dates: 10–16 March; 23–29 February
- Teams: 12

The 2024 IIHF World Championship Division III consisted of two international ice hockey tournaments ran by the International Ice Hockey Federation.

The Group A tournament was held in Bishkek, Kyrgyzstan, from 10 to 16 March 2024 and the Group B tournament in Sarajevo, Bosnia and Herzegovina, from 23 to 29 February 2024.

Thailand secured the top spot and promotion in Group A, while Bosnia and Herzegovina won the Group B tournament and got promoted. Mexico got relegated from Group A and Iran finished last in Group B and was relegated to Division IV.

== Group A tournament ==
2024 IIHF World Championship Division III A

Tournament details
- Host country: Kyrgyzstan
- City: Bishkek
- Venue: 1 (in 1 host city)
- Dates: 10–16 March
- Teams: 6

Tournament statistics
- Games played: 15
- Goals scored: 143 (9.53 per game)
- Attendance: 7,250 (483 per game)
- Scoring leader: (Thailand) Nicholas Lampson (19 points)

Official website
- Website

=== Participants ===
Team	Qualification
Mexico	Placed 6th in Division II B in 2023 and was relegated.
Turkmenistan	Placed 2nd in Division III A in 2023.
South Africa	Placed 3rd in Division III A in 2023.
Thailand	Placed 4th in Division III A in 2023.
Luxembourg	Placed 5th in Division III A in 2023.
Kyrgyzstan	Host, placed 1st in Division III B in 2023 and was promoted.

=== Match officials ===
Four referees and seven linesmen were selected for the tournament.

Referees	Linesmen
(Kazakhstan) Konstantin Chubenko; (South Korea) Chae Young-jin; (Turkey) Ferhat Aygün; (United States) David Gal	(Chinese Taipei) Yang Chang-lin; (Czech Republic) Miroslav Lhotský; (Georgia (country)) Tornike Kuchava; (Iceland) Sindri Gunnarsson; (Kazakhstan) Vladislav Zotov; (South Korea) Kang Kyu-seong; (Turkey) Berkay Aslanbey

=== Standings ===
Pos	Team	Pld	W	OTW	OTL	L	GF	GA	GD	Pts	Promotion or relegation
1	Thailand	5	5	0	0	0	38	9	+29	15	Promoted to the 2025 Division II B
2	Kyrgyzstan (H)	5	4	0	0	1	37	22	+15	12	
3	Luxembourg	5	2	1	0	2	17	22	−5	8	
4	Turkmenistan	5	2	0	0	3	23	31	−8	6	
5	South Africa	5	1	0	0	4	13	26	−13	3	
6	Mexico	5	0	0	1	4	15	33	−18	1	Relegated to the 2025 Division III B

Source: IIHF
Rules for classification: 1) points; 2) head-to-head points; 3) head-to-head goal difference; 4) head-to-head number of goals scored; 5) result against closest best-ranked team outside tied teams; 6) result against second-best ranked team outside tied teams; 7) seeding before tournament.
(H) Host

=== Results ===
All times are local (UTC+6).

10 March 2024; 14:00	South Africa	6–3 (3–1, 1–2, 2–0)	Mexico	Bishkek Arena, Bishkek; Attendance: 100

Game reference

Ryan Boyd
Goalies
Tomas Payro
Referee:
(Kazakhstan) Konstantin Chubenko
Linesmen:
(South Korea) Kang Kyu-seong
(Kazakhstan) Vladislav Zotov

Samaai (Valadas, Carelse) – 02:58	1–0
Valadas (Samaai, Carelse) – 08:31	2–0
Carelse (Valadas, Samaai) – 10:50	3–0
	3–1	13:11 – Tapia
	3–2	20:11 – Chávez (Álvarez) (PP)
Samaai – 21:59	4–2
	4–3	35:31 – Chávez
Birrell (Kluyts, Bremner) (PP) – 43:33	5–3
Van Doesburgh (Krotz, Giot) (PP2) – 45:42	6–3

18 min
Penalties
12 min
28
Shots
29

10 March 2024; 17:00	Turkmenistan	3–4 (0–2, 2–0, 1–2)	Luxembourg	Bishkek Arena, Bishkek; Attendance: 100

Game reference

Rahman Myradov
Goalies
Philippe Lepage
Referee:
(United States) David Gal
Linesmen:
(Turkey) Berkay Aslanbey
(Georgia (country)) Tornike Kuchava

	0–1	04:24 – Church (Cannon, Beran) (PP2)
	0–2	05:33 – C. Mossong (Beran) (PP)
Vahovskiy (Aganiyazov, Gurbanov) – 24:50	1–2
Tannyyev (Kakabayev) (PP) – 35:21	2–2
	2–3	44:13 – Cannon (Backes)
Baymyradov (Nuryyev) (PP) – 56:20	3–3
	3–4	59:04 – Cannon (Backes, P. Vincens) (PP)

14 min
Penalties
12 min
31
Shots
21

10 March 2024; 20:00	Kyrgyzstan	4–9 (2–1, 1–3, 1–5)	Thailand	Bishkek Arena, Bishkek; Attendance: 1,500

Game reference

Alexander Petrov
Arslan Maraimbekov
Goalies
Benjamin Kleineschay
Referee:
(South Korea) Chae Young-jin
Linesmen:
(Iceland) Sindri Gunnarsson
(Czech Republic) Miroslav Lhotský

Seifulov (Isamatov) – 01:24	1–0
	1–1	11:11 – Kindborn
Egorov (Chuvalov) – 14:17	2–1
	2–2	29:00 – Thanakroekkiat (Kitayama, Kindborn)
Mirbekov – 33:38	3–2
	3–3	38:48 – Limpinphet (Kindborn) (PP)
	3–4	39:02 – Kitayama (Suwachirat)
Leshchenko (Tonkikh) (PP) – 43:29	4–4
	4–5	43:53 – Lampson
	4–6	45:07 – Kitayama (Thanakroekkiat) (PP)
	4–7	53:22 – Isaksson (Kindborn) (PP)
	4–8	53:37 – Khuhakaew (Limpinphet, Kindborn)
	4–9	55:21 – Isaksson (Lampson) (PP)

16 min
Penalties
16 min
55
Shots
22

11 March 2024; 14:00	Turkmenistan	4–3 (2–1, 1–1, 1–1)	South Africa	Bishkek Arena, Bishkek; Attendance: 600

Game reference

Keremli Charyyev
Goalies
Ryan Boyd
Referee:
(Turkey) Ferhat Aygün
Linesmen:
(Iceland) Sindri Gunnarsson
(Georgia (country)) Tornike Kuchava

Nuryyev (Bayhanov, Baymyradov) – 01:58	1–0
Kakabayev (Esenov) – 13:16	2–0
	2–1	13:16 – Van Doesburgh (Giot)
Nuryyev (Baymyradov, Bayhanov) – 24:59	3–1
	3–2	30:24 – Van Doesburgh (Compton, Venter)
Dovletmyradov (Bayhanov) – 41:28	4–2
	4–3	42:00 – Valadas (Samaai, Carelse) (PP)

8 min
Penalties
13 min
29
Shots
22

11 March 2024; 17:00	Mexico	0–5 (0–2, 0–1, 0–2)	Thailand	Bishkek Arena, Bishkek; Attendance: 300

Game reference

Tomas Payro
Goalies
Benjamin Kleineschay
Referee:
(South Korea) Chae Young-jin
Linesmen:
(Czech Republic) Miroslav Lhotský
(Chinese Taipei) Yang Chang-lin

0–1	05:30 – Isaksson (Lampson, Kindborn)
0–2	08:15 – Kindborn
0–3	20:48 – Lampson (Kindborn, Isaksson) (PP)
0–4	40:56 – Isaksson (PS)
0–5	59:39 – Lampson (Forstner, Khuhakaew)

8 min
Penalties
12 min
29
Shots
40

11 March 2024; 20:00	Luxembourg	3–7 (0–3, 1–2, 2–2)	Kyrgyzstan	Bishkek Arena, Bishkek; Attendance: 800

Game reference

Philippe Lepage
Goalies
Alexander Petrov
Referee:
(United States) David Gal
Linesmen:
(South Korea) Kang Kyu-seong
(Kazakhstan) Vladislav Zotov

	0–1	13:46 – Titov (Seifulov, Ernazar IsamatovIsamatov)
	0–2	14:31 – Tonkikh (Egorov, Terentyev)
	0–3	17:01 – Seifulov (Isamatov) (SH)
Beran (Church, Cannon) – 28:17	1–3
	1–4	33:49 – Bekmuratov (Ismanov)
	1–5	36:28 – Seifulov (Kudashev)
	1–6	44:05 – Seifulov (Titov)
	1–7	49:49 – Mirbekov (Ismanov) (SH)
C. Mossong (Cannon) – 54:01	2–7
Backes (Cannon) (PP) – 56:35	3–7

8 min
Penalties
10 min
32
Shots
62

13 March 2024; 14:00	Mexico	4–5 OT (0–0, 1–1, 3–3) (OT: 0–1)	Luxembourg	Bishkek Arena, Bishkek; Attendance: 200

Game reference

Santiago Gómez
Goalies
Philippe Lepage
Referee:
(Turkey) Ferhat Aygün
Linesmen:
(Turkey) Berkay Aslanbey
(Chinese Taipei) Yang Chang-lin

A. Valencia (L. Valencia, Tapia) (PP) – 23:01	1–0
	1–1	34:01 – C. Mossong (Backes, Cannon) (PP2)
Esteban (Ayala) – 44:53	2–1
E. Valencia – 45:14	3–1
	3–2	47:55 – A. Vincens (C. Mossong, Cannon) (PP)
	3–3	49:03 – Backes (C. Mossong)
	3–4	50:00 – Church
Tapia (L. Valencia, Rullan) (PP) – 52:51	4–4
	4–5	62:27 – Mykkanen (Backes, Cannon) (PP)

24 min
Penalties
10 min
31
Shots
25

13 March 2024; 17:00	South Africa	1–5 (0–2, 0–2, 1–1)	Thailand	Bishkek Arena, Bishkek; Attendance: 200

Game reference

Ryan Boyd
Ivan Muller
Goalies
Benjamin Kleineschay
Referee:
(United States) David Gal
Linesmen:
(South Korea) Kang Kyu-seong
(Czech Republic) Miroslav Lhotský

	0–1	00:27 – Isaksson (Forstner, Lampson)
	0–2	04:38 – Kitayama (Suwachirat, Khuhakaew)
	0–3	28:37 – Kitayama (Isaksson)
	0–4	32:17 – Kitayama (Lampson, Isaksson) (PP2)
	0–5	40:28 – Isaksson (Forstner, Lampson)
Magmoed (Samaai) – 44:28	1–5

16 min
Penalties
12 min
24
Shots
46

13 March 2024; 20:00	Turkmenistan	5–7 (1–2, 2–2, 2–3)	Kyrgyzstan	Bishkek Arena, Bishkek; Attendance: 950

Game reference

Keremli Charyyev
Rahman Myradov
Goalies
Alexander Petrov
Referee:
(Kazakhstan) Konstantin Chubenko
Linesmen:
(Georgia (country)) Tornike Kuchava
(Kazakhstan) Vladislav Zotov

Barkovskiy (Vahovskiy) – 10:31	1–0
	1–1	14:26 – Tonkikh (Chuvalov, Egorov)
	1–2	17:52 – Kudashev (Titov, Seifulov)
	1–3	30:00 – Egorov (Seifulov, Nosov) (PP)
Baymyradov (Kakajanov) (PP) – 31:58	2–3
	2–4	35:58 – Seifulov (Abdyraev, Titov)
Bayjayev (Dovletmyradov, Kakabayev) – 39:28	3–4
	3–5	47:15 – Nosov (Seifulov)
Nuryyev – 50:23	4–5
	4–6	55:45 – Nosov (Titov, Isamatov) (PP)
Vahovskiy (Bayhanov, Gurbanov) (PP) – 57:34	5–6
	5–7	57:45 – Seifulov (Titov)

14 min
Penalties
18 min
19
Shots
58

14 March 2024; 14:00	Luxembourg	4–2 (2–1, 2–1, 0–0)	South Africa	Bishkek Arena, Bishkek; Attendance: 200

Game reference

Philippe Lepage
Goalies
Ivan Muller
Referee:
(South Korea) Chae Young-jin
Linesmen:
(Iceland) Sindri Gunnarsson
(South Korea) Kang Kyu-seong

Nunes – 04:47	1–0
	1–1	08:53 – Magmoed (Saaiman)
C. Mossong (Cannon, Backes) (PP) – 10:18	2–1
A. Vincens (N. Mossong) – 21:38	3–1
	3–2	28:07 – Samaai
Lasis (De. Mededovic, Beran) – 37:38	4–2

8 min
Penalties
6 min
29
Shots
29

14 March 2024; 17:00	Thailand	13–3 (3–2, 6–0, 4–1)	Turkmenistan	Bishkek Arena, Bishkek; Attendance: 300

Game reference

Benjamin Kleineschay
Goalies
Keremli Charyyev
Rahman Myradov
Referee:
(Kazakhstan) Konstantin Chubenko
Linesmen:
(Turkey) Berkay Aslanbey
(Georgia (country)) Tornike Kuchava

	0–1	04:50 – Esenov (Annasaparov, Nuryyev) (PP)
	0–2	06:14 – Esenov (Annasaparov, Nuryyev) (PP)
Khuhakaew (Lampson) – 08:41	1–2
Kindorn (Sutivijitho) – 09:19	2–2
Lampson (Kindborn, Kitayama) (PP) – 11:18	3–2
Kitayama (Lampson, Thanakroekkiat) – 22:03	4–2
Lampson (Kindborn) – 24:48	5–2
Isaksson (Lampson, Thanakroekkiat) (PP) – 31:51	6–2
Thanakroekkiat (Isaksson, Kindborn) (PP2) – 35:32	7–2
Forstner (Khuhakaew, Vatanapanyakul) – 36:33	8–2
Hongswadhi (Lampson, Forstner) – 39:05	9–2
Isaksson (Thanakroekkiat, Kindborn) (PP) – 41:15	10–2
Khuhakaew – 45:00	11–2
Lampson (Isaksson, Kitayama) – 50:54	12–2
	12–3	51:25 – Baymyradov (Nuryyev, Kakajanov)
Isaksson (Kitayama, Thanakroekkiat) – 58:25	13–3

15 min
Penalties
45 min
37
Shots
31

14 March 2024; 20:00	Kyrgyzstan	9–4 (4–1, 3–2, 2–1)	Mexico	Bishkek Arena, Bishkek; Attendance: 400

Game reference

Arslan Maraimbekov
Goalies
Tomas Payro
Santiago Gómez
Referee:
(United States) David Gal
Linesmen:
(Chinese Taipei) Yang Chang-lin
(Kazakhstan) Vladislav Zotov

Nosov (Chuvalov, Tonkikh) – 01:05	1–0
Seifulov (Titov) – 05:07	2–0
Abdyraev (Isamatov) (PP) – 08:14	3–0
	3–1	09:28 – L. Valencia (A. Valencia, Apud) (PP)
Seifulov (SH) – 13:06	4–1
Chuvalov (Tonkikh, Egorov) (SH) – 23:40	5–1
	5–2	28:28 – Tapia (A. Valencia, L. Valencia) (PP)
Mirbekov (Ismanov, Bekmuratov) – 33:46	6–2
Chuvalov (Tonkikh, Egorov) – 34:05	7–2
	7–3	38:21 – Apud (Tapia, Rullan) (PP)
Seifulov (Abdyraev, Titov) – 48:01	8–3
	8–4	54:46 – Tapia (A. Valencia, Apud) (PP)
Ismanov (Seifulov) (SH) – 56:34	9–4

22 min
Penalties
10 min
44
Shots
20

16 March 2024; 14:00	Thailand	6–1 (3–1, 2–0, 1–0)	Luxembourg	Bishkek Arena, Bishkek; Attendance: 200

Game reference

Benjamin Kleineschay
Goalies
Philippe Lepage
Referee:
(Kazakhstan) Konstantin Chubenk
Linesmen:
(Iceland) Sindri Gunnarsson
(Kazakhstan) Vladislav Zotov

Lampson (Kindborn, Isaksson) – 12:15	1–0
	1–1	16:50 – Mykkanen (Backes, Church) (PP)
Isaksson (Lampson) – 17:51	2–1
Lampson (Limpinphet, Isaksson) – 19:33	3–1
Kitayama (Isaksson, Kindborn) (PP) – 25:59	4–1
Lampson (Suwachirat) – 27:45	5–1
Suwachirat (Limpinphet, Kindborn) – 43:10	6–1

8 min
Penalties
10 min
38
Shots
27

16 March 2024; 17:00	Mexico	4–8 (1–3, 2–4, 1–1)	Turkmenistan	Bishkek Arena, Bishkek; Attendance: 400

Game reference

Santiago Gómez
Tomas Payro
Goalies
Keremli Charyyev
Referee:
(South Korea) Chae Young-jin
Linesmen:
(Turkey) Berkay Aslanbey
(Czech Republic) Miroslav Lhotský

Apud (Tapia) (SH) – 04:29	1–0
	1–1	11:02 – Dovletmyradov (Bayjayev, Nuryyev) (PP)
	1–2	14:16 – Vahovskiy (Hydyrov, Annasaparov)
	1–3	17:59 – Baymyradov (Esenov, Annasaparov)
	1–4	20:34 – Dovletmyradov (Barkovskiy, Geldimyradov)
	1–5	22:42 – Vahovskiy (Kakabayev, Bayjayev) (PP)
	1–6	25:39 – Baymyradov (Nuryyev) (SH)
A. Valencia (Rullan, Chávez) (PP) – 27:24	2–6
	2–7	28:17 – Nuryyev (Kakajanov, Geldimyradov)
Esteban (Rullan) – 34:05	3–7
Rullan (PP) – 48:24	4–7
	4–8	58:02 – Nuryyev (Baymyradov) (PP)

43 min
Penalties
67 min
30
Shots
20

16 March 2024; 20:00	South Africa	1–10 (0–4, 1–5, 0–1)	Kyrgyzstan	Bishkek Arena, Bishkek; Attendance: 1,000

Game reference

Ryan Boyd
Goalies
Arslan Maraimbekov
Referee:
(United States) David Gal
Linesmen:
(Georgia (country)) Tornike Kuchava
(Chinese Taipei) Yang Chang-lin

	0–1	02:30 – Egorov (Tonkikh)
	0–2	05:07 – Seifulov (Isamatov, Abdyraev) (PP)
	0–3	08:22 – Kudashev (Chuvalov, Nosov)
	0–4	17:48 – Sapitov (Ismanov, Mirbekov)
Magmoed (Giot, Carelse) (PP) – 30:02	1–4
	1–5	30:29 – Seifulov (Abdyraev)
	1–6	32:52 – Chuvalov (Egorov)
	1–7	34:31 – Titov (Egorov, Seifulov)
	1–8	37:35 – Chuvalov (Tonkikh, Egorov)
	1–9	39:44 – Chuvalov (Egorov) (PP)
	1–10	46:55 – Titov (Seifulov, Mirbekov)

8 min
Penalties
6 min
19
Shots
56

=== Statistics ===
==== Scoring leaders ====
List shows the top skaters sorted by points, then goals.

Player	GP	G	A	Pts	+/−	PIM	POS
(Thailand) Nicholas Lampson	5	9	10	19	+18	17	F
(Kyrgyzstan) Mamed Seifulov	5	11	7	18	+11	4	F
(Thailand) Jan Isaksson	5	10	8	18	+14	6	F
(Thailand) Ken Kindborn	5	3	13	16	+19	4	D
(Thailand) Masato Kitayama	5	7	5	12	+10	6	F
(Turkmenistan) Arslan Nuryyev	5	5	6	11	+4	8	F
(Kyrgyzstan) Maxim Egorov	5	3	8	11	+8	4	D
(Luxembourg) Colm Cannon	4	2	8	10	0	2	F
(Kyrgyzstan) Mikhail Chuvalov	5	5	4	9	+8	2	F
(Kyrgyzstan) Alexander Titov	5	6	10	9	+8	8	F

GP = Games played; G = Goals; A = Assists; Pts = Points; +/− = Plus/Minus; PIM = Penalties in Minutes; POS = Position
Source: IIHF.com

==== Goaltending leaders ====
Only the top five goaltenders, based on save percentage, who have played at least 40% of their team's minutes, are included in this list.

Player	TOI	GA	GAA	SA	Sv%	SO
(Thailand) Benjamin Kleineschay	291:56	9	1.85	164	94.51	1
(Luxembourg) Philippe Lepage	294:23	22	4.48	187	88.24	0
(South Africa) Ryan Boyd	231:26	21	5.44	147	85.71	0
(Kyrgyzstan) Arslan Maraimbekov	126:38	7	3.32	44	84.09	0
(Turkmenistan) Keremli Charyyev	218:50	22	6.03	128	82.81	0

TOI = time on ice (minutes:seconds); SA = shots against; GA = goals against; GAA = goals against average; Sv% = save percentage; SO = shutouts
Source: IIHF.com

=== Awards ===
Position	Player
Goaltender	(Thailand) Benjamin Kleineschay
Defenceman	(Thailand) Ken Kindborn
Forward	(Kyrgyzstan) Mamed Seifulov

== Group B tournament ==
2024 IIHF World Championship Division III B

Tournament details
- Host country: Bosnia and Herzegovina
- City: Sarajevo
- Venue: 1 (in 1 host city)
- Dates: 23–29 February
- Teams: 6

Tournament statistics
- Games played: 15
- Goals scored: 167 (11.13 per game)
- Attendance: 4,830 (322 per game)
- Scoring leader: (North Korea) Hong Chun-rim (20 points)

Official website
- IIHF

=== Participants ===
Team	Qualification
North Korea	Withdrew last edition and was relegated.
Bosnia and Herzegovina	Host, placed 2nd in Division III B in 2023.
Hong Kong	Placed 3rd in Division III B in 2023.
Singapore	Placed 4th in Division III B in 2023.
Iran	Placed 5th in Division III B in 2023.
Philippines	Placed 1st in Division IV in 2023 and was promoted.

=== Match officials ===
Four referees and seven linesmen were selected for the tournament.

Referees	Linesmen
(Italy) Alex Lazzeri; (Japan) Kenji Kosaka; (Turkey) Serkan Kocakara; (Ukraine) Oleh Serebryakov	(Denmark) Brian Kallesen; (Germany) Denis Menz; (Hong Kong) Chan Ka Hei; (Italy) Ulrich Pardatscher; (Latvia) Toms Mencis; (Mexico) Emilio Gómez; (New Zealand) Richard Button

=== Standings ===
Pos	Team	Pld	W	OTW	OTL	L	GF	GA	GD	Pts	Promotion or relegation
1	Bosnia and Herzegovina (H)	5	4	0	1	0	25	11	+14	13	Promoted to the 2025 Division III A
2	North Korea	5	4	0	0	1	38	22	+16	12	
3	Hong Kong	5	3	1	0	1	40	24	+16	11	
4	Philippines	5	2	0	0	3	30	30	0	6	
5	Singapore	5	1	0	0	4	20	35	−15	3	
6	Iran	5	0	0	0	5	14	45	−31	0	Relegated to the 2025 Division IV

Source: IIHF
Rules for classification: 1) points; 2) head-to-head points; 3) head-to-head goal difference; 4) head-to-head number of goals scored; 5) result against closest best-ranked team outside tied teams; 6) result against second-best ranked team outside tied teams; 7) seeding before tournament.
(H) Host

=== Results ===
All times are local (UTC+1).

23 February 2024; 13:00	Hong Kong	8–10 (3–1, 3–4, 2–5)	North Korea	Skenderija, Sarajevo; Attendance: 120

Game reference

Emerson Keung
Goalies
Jo Kwang-su
Ri Song-gun
Referee:
(Turkey) Serkan Kocakara
Linesmen:
(New Zealand) Richard Button
(Mexico) Emilio Gómez

	0–1	12:44 – Pak C. (SH2)
Chu (PP) – 13:28	1–1
Shum (PP) – 13:50	2–1
Ngan (Sham) – 14:50	3–1
Chu – 21:10	4–1
Shum (Chu) – 24:45	5–1
	5–2	25:37 – Hong (Kim H.)
	5–3	26:57 – Kang (Ryu J.)
	5–4	31:34 – Kim I.
	5–5	32:43 – Pak C. (Hong)
J. Cheng (L. Wong, Chau) – 38:31	6–5
	6–6	40:24 – Hong (Kim C.) (SH)
	6–7	45:34 – Hong (Pak C.)
M. Hsu (Sham) – 45:34	7–7
	7–8	49:31 – Kang (Choe)
J. Cheng (Chu, Law) – 50:05	8–8
	8–9	53:16 – Hong (Kim H.)
	8–10	59:36 – Pak C. (Hong) (EN)

8 min
Penalties
10 min
32
Shots
35

23 February 2024; 16:30	Philippines	6–3 (0–0, 2–2, 4–1)	Singapore	Skenderija, Sarajevo; Attendance: 50

Game reference

Paolo Spafford
Goalies
Liam Blakney
Referee:
(Japan) Kenji Kosaka
Linesmen:
(Hong Kong) Chan Ka Hei
(Denmark) Brian Kallesen

Billones (Regencia, Füglister) (PP) – 23:55	1–0
	1–1	24:32 – Lee (Kodrowski)
Billones – 26:18	2–1
	2–2	37:50 – E. Redden (O'Brien)
Sze (Füglister) – 45:16	3–2
Regencia (Füglister) – 47:39	4–2
	4–3	48:02 – Kelly (Chan, Gao)
Sibug (Füglister) (PP) – 56:11	5–3
Regencia (Billones) – 57:01	6–3

10 min
Penalties
8 min
38
Shots
29

23 February 2024; 20:00	Bosnia and Herzegovina	3–0 (1–0, 2–0, 0–0)	Iran	Skenderija, Sarajevo; Attendance: 750

Game reference

Dino Pašović
Goalies
Reza Poorhashemi
Referee:
(Italy) Alex Lazzeri
Linesmen:
(Latvia) Toms Mencis
(Germany) Denis Menz

Filipović (Viđen) – 08:15	1–0
Miškić (Omer, Vučinić) – 32:56	2–0
Gaković (Miškić) (EA) – 33:38	3–0

14 min
Penalties
8 min
48
Shots
23

24 February 2024; 13:00	North Korea	7–4 (2–2, 5–0, 0–2)	Singapore	Skenderija, Sarajevo; Attendance: 55

Game reference

Jo Kwang-su
Ri Song-gun
Goalies
Liam Blakney
Referee:
(Ukraine) Oleg Serebryakov
Linesmen:
(New Zealand) Richard Button
(Italy) Ulrich Pardatscher

Hong (Ryu K., Pak C.) – 02:48	1–0
	1–1	06:48 – E. Redden (Kodrowski)
	1–2	07:05 – Chan (Gao)
Kim I. (Kang, Pak K.) – 17:24	2–2
Sin (Choe) – 24:43	3–2
Kim I. (SH) – 30:00	4–2
Song (Kim I., Pak K.) – 31:29	5–2
Kim H. (Hong, Kim C.) (PP) – 33:40	6–2
Hong – 37:26	7–2
	7–3	51:08 – Chan (Hamnett)
	7–4	59:15 – Kodrowski (E. Redden)

6 min
Penalties
8 min
47
Shots
21

24 February 2024; 16:30	Iran	2–14 (0–7, 1–2, 1–5)	Philippines	Skenderija, Sarajevo; Attendance: 50

Game reference

Reza Poorhashemi
Navid Alizadeh
Goalies
Paolo Spafford
Irell Perez
Referee:
(Turkey) Serkan Kocakara
Linesmen:
(Hong Kong) Chan Ka Hei
(Mexico) Emilio Gómez

	0–1	00:26 – Sze (Füglister, Regencia)
	0–2	00:50 – Sze (Regencia, Füglister)
	0–3	11:06 – Sibug (Füglister, Sze) (PP2)
	0–4	13:06 – Füglister (Sze)
	0–5	14:17 – Regencia (Füglister, Billones) (PP)
	0–6	17:48 – Billones (Füglister, Regencia) (PP2)
	0–7	19:01 – Füglister (Regencia, Billones) (PP)
Ghafoori (Mehraban, Ghahar) – 28:08	1–7
	1–8	30:55 – Sibug (Billones, Regencia) (PP2)
	1–9	34:02 – Abis
	1–10	46:02 – Sibug (Regencia, Billones) (PP)
Farsad (Bagheri) – 46:26	2–10
	2–11	46:57 – Imperial
	2–12	48:36 – Füglister (Billones, Regencia) (PP)
	2–13	54:10 – Sze
	2–14	54:48 – Tigaronita (Pastrana)

20 min
Penalties
6 min
20
Shots
50

24 February 2024; 20:00	Bosnia and Herzegovina	3–4 OT (1–2, 2–1, 0–0) (OT: 0–1)	Hong Kong	Skenderija, Sarajevo; Attendance: 850

Game reference

Dino Pašović
Goalies
King Ho
Emerson Keung
Referee:
(Japan) Kenji Kosaka
Linesmen:
(Denmark) Brian Kallesen
(Latvia) Toms Mencis

	0–1	04:50 – Chu (Shum, He. Cheng)
	0–2	08:26 – Au-Yeung (Cheng Ho, E. Hsu)
Gaković (Mlivić) (PP) – 13:49	1–2
	1–3	28:16 – Shum (PS)
Omer (Mlivić) – 32:28	2–3
Omer (Mlivić, Mrkva) (PP) – 34:53	3–3
	3–4	63:55 – Yam Yi (Yam Yau)

10 min
Penalties
22 min
37
Shots
29

26 February 2024; 13:00	North Korea	9–4 (3–1, 3–2, 3–1)	Iran	Skenderija, Sarajevo; Attendance: 50

Game reference

Jo Kwang-su
Ri Song-gun
Goalies
Reza Poorhashemi
Referee:
(Japan) Kenji Kosaka
Linesmen:
(Germany) Denis Menz
(Italy) Ulrich Pardatscher

Choe (Kim S., Kang) – 01:20	1–0
Kim C. (Pak C., Hong) – 09:44	2–0
	2–1	11:16 – Farsad (Bagheri, Ghafoori)
Song (Ri C.) – 16:17	3–1
Hong (Ryu K., Kim C.) (PP) – 22:57	4–1
	4–2	23:27 – Keyhanfar (Mehraban)
	4–3	25:31 – Ghafoori (Bagheri, Houshidari) (PP)
Kang (Kim I., Choe) – 29:03	5–3
Kim H. (Hong, Ryu K.) (PP) – 31:58	6–3
Kim S. (Kang, Choe) – 46:01	7–3
Hong (Ryu K., Kim C.) (PP) – 51:49	8–3
	8–4	53:48 – Hamzeh (Ghafoori)
Kim H. (Pak C., Hong) – 59:24	9–4

10 min
Penalties
18 min
52
Shots
22

26 February 2024; 16:30	Hong Kong	8–3 (1–2, 4–1, 3–0)	Singapore	Skenderija, Sarajevo; Attendance: 30

Game reference

Emerson Keung
Goalies
Liam Blakney
Referee:
(Ukraine) Oleg Serebryakov
Linesmen:
(New Zealand) Richard Button
(Mexico) Emilio Gómez

Sham (Shum) – 01:21	1–0
	1–1	01:57 – Lee
	1–2	18:38 – E. Redden (Chan)
J. Cheng (Yam Yi) (PP) – 26:35	2–2
Chu (Sham, J. Cheng) (PP) – 28:39	3–2
J. Cheng (Ngan, Law) – 31:44	4–2
Shum (J. Cheng, He. Cheng) (PP) – 37:36	5–2
	5–3	37:44 – Chan (Kelly)
Shum (Chu) – 40:22	6–3
Chu (J. Cheng, Leung) – 44:43	7–3
Sham (He. Cheng, J. Cheng) (PP) – 48:59	8–3

12 min
Penalties
16 min
41
Shots
29

26 February 2024; 20:00	Bosnia and Herzegovina	6–3 (2–0, 2–1, 2–2)	Philippines	Skenderija, Sarajevo; Attendance: 300

Game reference

Dino Pašović
Goalies
Paolo Spafford
Referee:
(Italy) Alex Lazzeri
Linesmen:
(Hong Kong) Chan Ka Hei
(Denmark) Brian Kallesen

Gaković (Omer, Filipović) – 03:15	1–0
Sinanbegović (Vulović) (PP) – 15:30	2–0
Gaković (Viđen) – 25:14	3–0
Mlivić (Sinanbegović, Vučinić) – 38:04	4–0
	4–1	39:26 – Sze (Füglister, Billones)
Gaković (Omer) – 40:24	5–1
	5–2	51:02 – Sze (Abis)
	5–3	57:20 – Abis (Regencia, Sibug) (EA)
Omer (Filipović) (EN) – 58:22	6–3

8 min
Penalties
12 min
39
Shots
40

27 February 2024; 13:00	Iran	3–11 (2–4, 0–5, 1–2)	Hong Kong	Skenderija, Sarajevo; Attendance: 40

Game reference

Reza Poorhashemi
Goalies
King Ho
Referee:
(Turkey) Serkan Kocakara
Linesmen:
(Latvia) Toms Mencis
(Italy) Ulrich Pardatscher

Eslami (Jalal) – 01:32	1–0
Farsad (Ghafoori) – 03:06	2–0
	2–1	03:31 – Ngan (E. Hsu, M. Hsu)
	2–2	04:21 – L. Wong (Chau, Au-Yeung)
	2–3	07:03 – Sham (He. Cheng, Yam Yau) (PP)
	2–4	16:50 – J. Cheng (He. Cheng, Shum)
	2–5	21:58 – Ngan (Shum) (PP)
	2–6	22:22 – L. Wong (Au-Yeung, Chau)
	2–7	25:05 – Yeung (J. Cheng) (PP)
	2–8	32:18 – J. Cheng (Chu)
	2–9	38:46 – Ngan (E. Hsu)
	2–10	49:59 – Shum (Yam Yau)
	2–11	52:01 – L. Wong (Y. Wong, Yeung) (PP)
Bagheri (Ghafoori, Abdollahi) – 54:14	3–11

16 min
Penalties
10 min
18
Shots
55

27 February 2024; 16:30	Philippines	2–10 (1–2, 0–7, 1–1)	North Korea	Skenderija, Sarajevo; Attendance: 35

Game reference

Paolo Spafford
Irell Perez
Goalies
Jo Kwang-su
Referee:
(Ukraine) Oleg Serebryakov
Linesmen:
(New Zealand) Richard Button
(Germany) Denis Menz

	0–1	15:35 Kim H. (Pak C.)
	0–2	18:31 – Kim H. (Hong, Ryu K.)
Sze (Sibug) – 19:27	1–2
	1–3	24:44 – Pak K.
	1–4	28:03 – Pak K. (Choe, Kim I.) (PP)
	1–5	29:06 – Kim S. (Kim I., Kang)
	1–6	32:01 – Ryu J. (Hong)
	1–7	33:43 – Pak C. (Hong)
	1–8	38:34 – Kim I. (Pak K.)
	1–9	39:54 – Sin H. (Won, Song)
Regencia (Tigaronta) – 52:28	2–9
	2–10	59:39 – Hong (Pak C., Ryu K.) (PP)

14 min
Penalties
12 min
25
Shots
47

27 February 2024; 20:00	Singapore	2–9 (1–4, 1–3, 1–2)	Bosnia and Herzegovina	Skenderija, Sarajevo; Attendance: 700

Game reference

Liam Blakney
Lee Chin Hao
Goalies
Karim Ahmetovski
Referee:
(Italy) Alex Lazzeri
Linesmen:
(Hong Kong) Chan Ka Hei
(Mexico) Emilio Gómez

	0–1	00:26 – Smajlović (Alic, Mlivić)
	0–2	03:43 – Andrijasevic (Vučinić, Mlivić)
E. Redden – 04:28	1–2
	1–3	12:35 – Gaković (Mlivić)
	1–4	14:31 – Sinanbegović (Gaković)
	1–5	24:38 – Gaković (Ćatović)
Hamnett (Chan, E. Redden) (PP) – 34:46	2–5
	2–6	39:23 – Cordalija (Mlivić)
	2–7	39:54 – Mlivić (Cordalija)
	2–8	42:12 – Mlivić (Cordalija)
	2–9	58:37 – Miškić (Alic)

4 min
Penalties
14 min
32
Shots
44

29 February 2024; 13:00	Singapore	8–5 (2–0, 2–2, 4–3)	Iran	Skenderija, Sarajevo; Attendance: 50

Game reference

Liam Blakney
Goalies
Reza Poorhashemi
Referee:
(Italy) Alex Lazzeri
Linesmen:
(Germany) Denis Menz
(Italy) Ulrich Pardatscher

Kodrowski (Lee, Chew) – 09:20	1–0
Kodrowski (Lee, E. Redden) – 10:31	2–0
	2–1	21:16 – Keyhanfar
Chan (E. Redden) (PP) – 23:01	3–1
	3–2	32:03 – Farsad (SH)
E. Redden – 34:37	4–2
E. Redden (Kodrowski, Lee) – 41:45	5–2
	5–3	43:37 – Ghahar (Bahri, Ghafoori) (PP)
	5–4	44:10 – Mehraban (Heidari, Korehei)
Kodrowski (E. Redden) – 45:29	6–4
	6–5	47:46 – Hamzeh (Mehraban)
Chan – 57:16	7–5
E. Redden (EN) – 59:37	8–5

10 min
Penalties
6 min
45
Shots
29

29 February 2024; 16:30	Hong Kong	9–5 (3–1, 3–3, 3–1)	Philippines	Skenderija, Sarajevo; Attendance: 50

Game reference

King Ho
Goalies
Paolo Spafford
Irell Perez
Referee:
(Japan) Kenji Kosaka
Linesmen:
(New Zealand) Richard Button
(Hong Kong) Chan Ka Hei

E. Hsu (Ngan, Sham) – 05:25	1–0
	1–1	10:14 – Abis (Sze) (SH)
Yam Yau (J. Cheng) – 13:49	2–1
Yam Yau (J. Cheng, Cheng Ho) (EA) – 18:53	3–1
	3–2	27:50 – Billones (Regencia, Sze) (PP)
	3–3	29:42 – Sibug (Füglister, Billones) (PP)
	3–4	30:49 – Sze (Füglister)
Sham (E. Hsu, Ngan) – 31:29	4–4
Sham (He. Cheng, J. Cheng) (PP) – 33:40	5–4
Sham (J. Cheng) (PP) – 38:48	6–4
	6–5	41:21 – Imperial (Tigaronita)
Yam Yi (J. Cheng) – 52:30	7–5
Y. Wong (L. Wong, Shum) (PP) – 56:57	8–5
Chu (J. Cheng, Yam Yi) (EN) – 59:10	9–5

10 min
Penalties
14 min
36
Shots
31

29 February 2024; 20:00	North Korea	2–4 (2–1, 0–2, 0–1)	Bosnia and Herzegovina	Skenderija, Sarajevo; Attendance: 1,700

Game reference

Jo Kwang-su
Goalies
Dino Pašović
Referee:
(Ukraine) Oleg Serebryakov
Linesmen:
(Denmark) Brian Kallesen
(Latvia) Toms Mencis

Hong (Pak C.) – 01:56	1–0
	1–1	14:42 – Gaković (Filipović, Smajlović)
Hong (Ryu K.) – 17:43	2–1
	2–2	37:16 – Cordalija (Sinanbegović, Vučinić) (PP)
	2–3	37:56 – Andrijasevic (Miškić, Mlivić)
	2–4	42:57 – Miškić (Pleho, Mrkva) (PP)

14 min
Penalties
10 min
47
Shots
31

=== Statistics ===
==== Scoring leaders ====
List shows the top skaters sorted by points, then goals.

Player	GP	G	A	Pts	+/−	PIM	POS
(North Korea) Hong Shun-rim	5	11	9	20	+11	2	F
(Hong Kong) Justin Cheng	5	6	11	17	+1	0	F
(Philippines) Steven Füglister	5	3	12	15	–1	2	F
(Philippines) Jan Regencia	5	4	10	14	–4	0	F
(Philippines) Kenwrick Sze	5	8	4	12	–5	8	F
(Singapore) Ethan Redden	5	7	5	12	–1	2	F
(Hong Kong) Michael Shum	5	6	6	12	–1	4	F
(Philippines) Manvil Billones	5	4	8	12	–7	4	F
(North Korea) Pak Chung-hyok	5	4	7	11	+11	2	F
(Bosnia and Herzegovina) Adnan Mlivić	5	3	8	11	+7	2	F

GP = Games played; G = Goals; A = Assists; Pts = Points; +/− = Plus/Minus; PIM = Penalties in Minutes; POS = Position
Source: IIHF.com

==== Goaltending leaders ====
Only the top five goaltenders, based on save percentage, who have played at least 40% of their team's minutes, are included in this list.

Player	TOI	GA	GAA	SA	Sv%	SO
(Bosnia and Herzegovina) Dino Pašović	243:54	9	2.21	136	93.53	1
(Hong Kong) King Ho	164:15	11	4.02	77	85.71	0
(North Korea) Jo Kwang-su	230:46	16	4.16	90	84.91	0
(Iran) Reza Poorhashemi	252:19	35	8.32	215	83.72	0
(Hong Kong) Emerson Keung	139:16	12	5.17	72	83.33	0

TOI = time on ice (minutes:seconds); SA = shots against; GA = goals against; GAA = goals against average; Sv% = save percentage; SO = shutouts
Source: IIHF.com

=== Awards ===
Position	Player
Goaltender	(Bosnia and Herzegovina) Dino Pašović
Defenceman	(Bosnia and Herzegovina) Haris Mrkva
Forward	(North Korea) Hong Chun-rim
