= 2024 IIHF Women's Asia and Oceania Cup =

Tournament details
- Host country: Kyrgyzstan
- City: Bishkek
- Venue: 1 (in 1 host city)
- Dates: 24–30 March
- Teams: 5

Final positions
- Champions: Iran
- Runners-up: Philippines
- Third place: United Arab Emirates
- Fourth place: India

Tournament statistics
- Games played: 10
- Goals scored: 81 (8.1 per game)
- Attendance: 3,800 (380 per game)
- Scoring leader: (Iran) Asal Heydari (11 points)

Official website
- www.iihf.com

The 2024 IIHF Women's Asia and Oceania Cup was an international women's ice hockey tournament run by the International Ice Hockey Federation (IIHF). This edition of the tournament took place between 24 and 30 March 2024 in Bishkek, Kyrgyzstan. The tournament follows a single round robin format. Iran clinched the title.

== Participating teams ==
Team	2023 result
Kyrgyzstan	Host, finished 7th last year.
Iran	Won silver medal last year.
India	Finished 4th last year.
Philippines	Did not participate last year. Won gold medal in 2019 Division I.
United Arab Emirates	Finished 5th last year.

== Match results ==
Pos	Team	Pld	W	OTW	OTL	L	GF	GA	GD	Pts
1	Iran	4	4	0	0	0	36	0	+36	12
2	Philippines	4	3	0	0	1	17	10	+7	9
3	United Arab Emirates	4	2	0	0	2	10	24	−14	6
4	India	4	1	0	0	3	7	22	−15	3
5	Kyrgyzstan (H)	4	0	0	0	4	11	25	−14	0

Source: IIHF
(H) Host

All times are local (UTC+6).

24 March 2024; 16:30	United Arab Emirates	0–16 (0–5, 0–5, 0–6)	Iran	Gorodskoi Katok, Bishkek; Attendance: 200

Game reference
24 min	Penalties	8 min
7	Shots	40

24 March 2024; 20:00	Philippines	7–4 (2–3, 1–0, 4–1)	Kyrgyzstan	Gorodskoi Katok, Bishkek; Attendance: 300

Game reference
12 min	Penalties	12 min
34	Shots	18

25 March 2024; 16:30	India	1–2 (0–0, 0–2, 1–0)	United Arab Emirates	Gorodskoi Katok, Bishkek; Attendance: 200

Game reference
14 min	Penalties	12 min
12	Shots	18

25 March 2024; 20:00	Iran	6–0 (1–0, 1–0, 4–0)	Kyrgyzstan	Gorodskoi Katok, Bishkek; Attendance: 600

Game reference
16 min	Penalties	18 min
36	Shots	7

27 March 2024; 16:30	India	0–7 (0–1, 0–3, 0–3)	Philippines	Gorodskoi Katok, Bishkek; Attendance: 300

Game reference
16 min	Penalties	12 min
20	Shots	21

27 March 2024; 20:00	United Arab Emirates	6–4 (0–3, 3–0, 3–1)	Kyrgyzstan	Gorodskoi Katok, Bishkek; Attendance: 400

Game reference
20 min	Penalties	12 min
35	Shots	22

29 March 2024; 16:30	United Arab Emirates	2–3 (1–1, 0–1, 1–1)	Philippines	Gorodskoi Katok, Bishkek; Attendance: 200

Game reference
35 min	Penalties	8 min
25	Shots	17

29 March 2024; 20:00	Iran	10–0 (3–0, 2–0, 5–0)	India	Gorodskoi Katok, Bishkek; Attendance: 600

Game reference
4 min	Penalties	2 min
30	Shots	6

30 March 2024; 16:30	Philippines	0–4 (0–1, 0–3, 0–0)	Iran	Gorodskoi Katok, Bishkek; Attendance: 600

Game reference
6 min	Penalties	11 min
3	Shots	38

30 March 2024; 20:00	Kyrgyzstan	3–6 (0–2, 1–3, 2–1)	India	Gorodskoi Katok, Bishkek; Attendance: 400

Game reference
4 min	Penalties	14 min
16	Shots	23
