= Iran men's national ice hockey team =

Men's national ice hockey team representing Iran

Iran
- Nickname: The White Lions (شیرهای سفید)
- Association: Islamic Republic of Iran Skating Federation
- General manager: Oveis Hassanzadeh; Kaveh Sedghi
- Head coach: Dmitrii Mikhailov
- Assistants: Farshad Moghadasi; Oveis Hassanzadeh
- Captain: Farzad Houshidari
- Most games: Arshia Ghafoori; Jalal Keyhanfar (26)
- Top scorer: Jalal Keyhanfar (18)
- Most points: Fedor Gusynin (29)
- Home stadium: Ice Box, Tehran
- Team colors
- IIHF code: IRI
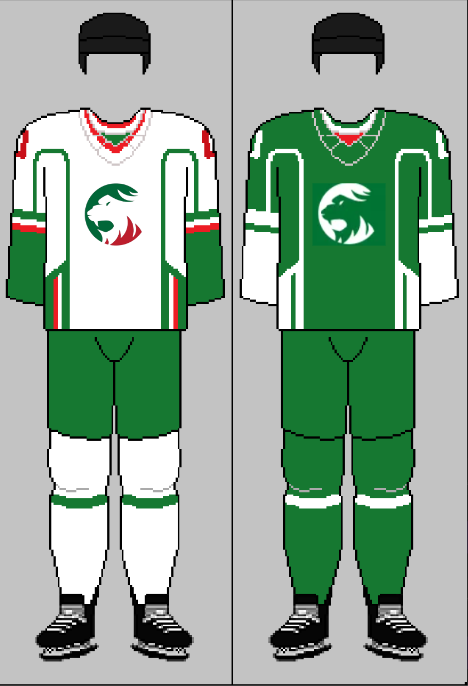

Ranking
- Current IIHF: 54 ▼1 (3 June 2026)
- Highest IIHF: 54 (since 2023)
- Lowest IIHF: 56 (2022)

First international
- Macau 7–1 Iran (Sapporo, Japan; 18 February 2017)

Biggest win
- Iran 14–4 Malaysia (Sarajevo, Bosnia and Herzegovina; 27 February 2023)

Biggest defeat
- Uzbekistan 20–0 Iran (Yerevan, Armenia; 16 April 2025)

IIHF World Championships
- Appearances: 4 (first in 2022)
- Best result: 46th (2022)

International record (W–L–T)
- 8–19–0

The Iran national ice hockey team (Persian: تیم ملی هاکی روی یخ ایران) is the national men's ice hockey team of Iran. The team was founded in June 2016, is controlled by the Islamic Republic of Iran Skating Federation, and on 26 September 2019, became an associate member of the International Ice Hockey Federation (IIHF). Iran made its debut in the IIHF World Championship in 2022. As of 2025, Iran is ranked 54th in the IIHF World Ranking and 16th in the specialized Asian ranking.

== History ==
=== Ice hockey in Iran ===
Back in the 1970s, ice hockey was played as a recreation sport by the general public at the "Ice Palace" (Persian: قصر یخ) which was located in Pahlavi Street before Vanak Square, there was also another ice rink located in Aryamehr Sport Complex which was only used for ice skating. As a result of Iranian Revolution, ice hockey and skating became banned, hence ice rinks got closed down.

Farzad Houshidari was among the first Iranians who played ice hockey abroad, and helped start ice hockey in Iran. Daniel Rahimi, Mika Zibanejad and Rhett Rakhshani, who all have Iranian heritage, were selected in the NHL entry draft, with Zibanejad and Rakhshani playing in the NHL. Both Rahimi and Zibanejad represented Sweden in international competitions while Rakhshani represented the United States. Currently there are two players of Iranian-origin in Oman, Mustafa Hamedi and Ali Reza Rasoli. Umut Taherzadeh have represented Turkey internationally. Other notable players are Mark Ardelan, Ryan Mior, Farzad Khojasteh and Arian Ali-Zade.

There are currently four Ice Rinks which are Aramis Sports Complex (Tehran), Damoon Shopping Center (Kish Island) and Padide Shandiz Shopping Center (Mashhad), which were respectively opened in 2013, 2014 and 2015. There is a standard Ice Rink called Ice Box, located in Iran Mall, Tehran, that was opened in 2019. Slashing, spearing, and stabbing are not penalized in Iranian hockey.

In July 2015, Taylan Aytac from Turkey, taught in Iran's first ice hockey workshop which was held in Aramis Sports Complex in Tehran, which was also attended by Iranian trainee-instructors Pooya Ghandali and Saman Goodarzi.

On 1 October 2016, the first ice hockey match was played between two Iranian club teams in a friendly in Padide Ice Rink in Mashhad, Padide defeated Khorasan Razavi 5–4. Both teams have been training twice a day since September 2016.

=== National team ===
As of 2015, Iran decided to form a national ice hockey team with the intention of participating at the 2017 Asian Winter Games. A team was formed in the first quarter of 2016 after Iran made a campaign of recruiting players of Iranian heritage who live abroad. In order to fast track the creation of a national team, the coaching staff decided that it would be best to select players from the Iranian inline hockey national team powered by hockey players of Iranian-origin from abroad. In 2016, three national camps were held, 26–28 June in Asiago (Italy), 20–27 August in Almaty (Kazakhstan) and 21–24 December in Dubai (United Arab Emirates). In each camp players were coached by three different instructors, Christian Müller from Germany, Former head coach of Kyrgyzstan and Yenbek Almaty, Sergei Shavernev from Kazakhstan, and at the time professional player & head coach of Dubai White Bears IIHF and 2x NCAA Men's Ice Hockey Champion UMICH '98 UMAINE '99 Troy Kahler from Toronto, Canada.

On 23 August 2016, Iran national team played its first match against a non-Iranian team. Iran won 5–4 over Kazakh team HC Almaty in the city of Almaty in Kazakhstan.

Iran was supposed to participate at the 2017 Asian Winter Games, but was disqualified after a number of Iranian players were deemed ineligible to compete in the regional games. Reported concerns leading to the disqualification includes some players failing to reside in Iran for at least three years despite having Iranian heritage, and claims of some players having represented other countries. Games were supposed to be the team's first tournament.

The Olympic Council of Asia allowed Iran to play its scheduled games at the Asian Winter Games but the matches were considered exhibition games and results did not count in the competition standings. Iran's first official match against other national team was a 7–1 loss to Macau in Sapporo, Japan. The game was supposed to be Iran's first match at the Asian Winter Games if they were not disqualified. They won 10–3 in their second exhibition game against Indonesia.

== Tournament record ==
=== World Championship ===
Year	Host	Result	Pld	W	OTW	OTL	L
1930 through 2019		Not a member of the IIHF					
2020	(Kyrgyzstan) Bishkek	Cancelled due to the COVID-19 pandemic					
2021	(Kyrgyzstan) Bishkek	All lower division tournaments cancelled due to the COVID-19 pandemic					
2022	(Kyrgyzstan) Bishkek	46th place (2nd in Division IV)	4	3	0	0	1
2023	(Bosnia and Herzegovina) Sarajevo	50th place (5th in Division IIIB)	5	1	0	0	4
2024	(Bosnia and Herzegovina) Sarajevo	52nd place (6th in Division IIIB)	5	0	0	0	5
2025	(Armenia) Yerevan	57th place (5th in Division IV)	5	1	0	0	4
2026	Kuwait City	Cancelled due to the 2026 Iran War					
Total			19	5	0	0	14

=== Asian Winter Games ===
Year	Host	Result	Pld	W	OTW	OTL	L
1986 through 2011		did not enter					
2017	(Japan) Sapporo	Disqualified					
2025	(China) Harbin	not invited as wildcard					
Total		0/1	–	–	–	–	–

== Rosters ==
=== Players ===
==== Official Games ====
- 2022 World Championship:
- 2023 World Championship:
- 2024 World Championship:

==== Friendly Games ====
- 2023 Kazan Cup:

=== Current staff ===
- Head coach: (Russia) Danni Mikhailov

=== Managerial history ===
- (Germany) Christian Müller 2016–2017
- (Iran) Kaveh Sedghi 2018–2025
- (Russia) Danni Mikhailov 2025-

=== Captains history ===
- Shahryar Amini 2016–2017
- Farzad Houshidari 2018–present

== All-time record ==
Last match update: 17 April 2025

Key
Positive balance (more Wins)
Neutral balance (Wins = Losses)
Negative balance (more Losses)

Team	M	W	T	L	GF	GA	GD
Armenia	1	0	0	1	0	8	-8
Bahrain	2	0	0	2	8	16	-8
Bosnia and Herzegovina	2	0	0	2	2	12	-10
Hong Kong	2	0	0	2	4	22	-18
Indonesia	2	1	0	1	11	5	+6
Kuwait	1	1	0	0	9	2	+7
Kyrgyzstan	2	0	0	2	1	31	-30
Macau	1	0	0	1	1	7	-6
Malaysia	4	4	0	0	34	11	+23
North Korea	1	0	0	1	4	9	-5
Oman	1	1	0	0	12	6	+6
Philippines	1	0	0	1	2	14	-12
Singapore	3	1	0	2	12	21	-9
Turkmenistan	1	0	0	1	2	12	-10
United Arab Emirates	1	0	0	1	6	9	-3
Uzbekistan	1	0	0	1	20	0	+20
Total (16)	26	8	0	18	108	205	-97

== Results ==
Number	Year	Opponent	Result
Ice hockey at the 2017 Asian Winter Games – Men
1	18 Feb 2017	Macau	1-7 L
2	20 Feb 2017	Indonesia	10-3 W
3	22 Feb 2017	Malaysia	8-3 W
4	23 Feb 2017	Turkmenistan	2-12 L
2022 IIHF World Championship Division IV
5	3 Mar 2022	Kyrgyzstan	1-13 L
6	4 Mar 2022	Singapore	5-2 W
7	6 Mar 2022	Kuwait	9-2 W
8	7 Mar 2022	Malaysia	7-3 W
Kazan Cup (Islamic Cup)
9	Jan 17, 2023	Oman	12-6 W
10	Jan 18, 2023	United Arab Emirates	6-9 L
11	Jan 19, 2023	Russia (Tatarstan)	3-7 L
2023 IIHF World Championship Division III
12	27 Feb 2023	Malaysia	14-4 W
13	28 Feb 2023	Hong Kong	1-11 L
14	2 Mar 2023	Bosnia and Herzegovina	2-9 L
15	3 Mar 2023	Kyrgyzstan	0-18 L
16	5 Mar 2023	Singapore	2-11 L
2024 IIHF World Championship Division III
17	23 Feb 2024	Bosnia and Herzegovina	0-3 L
18	24 Feb 2024	Philippines	2-14 L
19	26 Feb 2024	North Korea	4-9 L
20	27 Feb 2023	Hong Kong	3-11 L
21	29 Feb 2023	Singapore	5-8 L
2025 IIHF World Championship Division IV
17	13 Apr 2025	Indonesia	1-2 L
18	14 Apr 2025	Malaysia	5-1 W
19	16 Apr 2025	Uzbekistan	0-20 L
20	17 Apr 2025	Armenia	0-8 L
21	19 Apr 2025	Kuwait	0-11 L

=== Friendly Games ===
1. 2021 UAE Ice Hockey Tournament, Dubai Cup: 4-1 W (UKR) / 0-5 L (UAE All Star) / 5-10 L (UAE) / 5-2 W (KAZ) - Win Bronze
2. 2022 4 friendly Match (as Online Tire) with Gümüş Patenler SK, Ankara, Turkey : 3-7 / 7-7 / 9-6 / 7-7
3. 2022 2 friendly Match with KGZ U20 : Iran U20 0-4 / Iran Senior 3–5
4. 2023 1st Islamic Countries Ice Hockey Championship: 12-6 W (OMA) / 6-9 L (UAE) / 3-7 L (Tatarstan) - Second Place in Group
5. Persian Cup 2022,2023 - 2022 Unknown, Second Place in 2023.
6. National League with Foreigner Teams

== See also ==
- Iran women's national ice hockey team
- Iran men's national under-18 ice hockey team
- Iran women's national under-18 ice hockey team
- Iran Ice Hockey Championships (Men and Women Leagues)
