= Kyrgyzstan men's national ice hockey team =

National sports team

Kyrgyzstan
- Association: Ice Hockey Federation of the Kyrgyz Republic
- General manager: Elzar Bolotbekov
- Head coach: Ayvaz Khalikov
- Captain: Mamed Seifulov
- Most games: Uran Tursunbekov (29)
- Top scorer: Mamed Seifulov (29)
- Most points: Vladimir Nosov (56)
- Home stadium: Bishkek Arena
- Team colors
- IIHF code: KGZ

Ranking
- Current IIHF: NR (3 June 2026)
- Highest IIHF: 41 (2025)
- Lowest IIHF: 52 (2019–21)

First international
- Kyrgyzstan 15–4 Thailand (Astana, Kazakhstan; 28 January 2011)

Biggest win
- Kyrgyzstan 29–0 Bahrain (Harbin, China; 5 February 2025)

Biggest defeat
- South Korea 20–0 Kyrgyzstan (Harbin, China; 11 February 2025)

IIHF World Championships
- Appearances: 6 (first in 2019)
- Best result: 41st (2025)

Asian Winter Games
- Appearances: 2 (first in 2011)
- Best result: 6th (2011)

IIHF Challenge Cup of Asia
- Appearances: 3 (first in 2014)
- Best result: 6th (2016)

International record (W–L–T)
- 41–14–0

The Kyrgyzstan national ice hockey team (Kyrgyz: Кыргызстандын улуттук шайбалуу хоккей курамасы, romanized: Kyrgyzstandyn Uluttuk Shaibaluu Hokkei Kuramasy; Russian: Сборная Киргизии по хоккею с шайбой) is the national men's ice hockey team of Kyrgyzstan. They are controlled by the Ice Hockey Federation of the Kyrgyz Republic and has been an associate member of the International Ice Hockey Federation (IIHF). As of 2025, Kyrgyzstan is ranked 41st in the IIHF World Ranking and 10th in the Asian Ranking.

== History ==
Kyrgyzstan played its first game in 1962 during the Winter Spartakiad which was held in Sverdlovsk, USSR, in which they represented the Kirghiz Soviet Socialist Republic. Kyrgyzstan played seven games, winning both games against the Armenian SSR and losing five to the Ukrainian SSR, the Estonian SSR, the Latvian SSR, the Georgian SSR and the Lithuanian SSR respectively.

In 2011 Kyrgyzstan returned to international play when they competed in the Premier Division of the 2011 Asian Winter Games. In the first game of the tournament, Kyrgyzstan recorded their first-ever win, defeating Thailand 15–4. Kyrgyzstan went on to win the Premier Division after winning all six of their games and finishing on top of the table.

Kyrgyzstan made its debut in the World Championships in 2019, playing in the Division III qualification tournament held in Abu Dhabi, United Arab Emirates. They finished first after winning all five games. However, all their first four games were later voided and the results were counted as 5–0 forfeits due to Kyrgyzstan's player Aleksandr Titov being disqualified. Later IIHF acknowledged they had made a mistake, but the results would still stand. Tournaments in 2020 and 2021 were cancelled due to the COVID-19 pandemic, but Kyrgyzstan hosted the 2022 Division IV tournament.

== Tournament record ==
=== World Championships ===
Year	Host	Result	Pld	W	OTW	OTL	L
1954 through 1991		As part of the Soviet Union					
1992 through 2018		Did not enter					
2019	(United Arab Emirates) Abu Dhabi	52nd place (Note: After winning their first four games, a player was disqualified and all their results were counted as 5–0 forfeits.) (6th in Division III Q)	5	1	0	0	4
2020	(Kyrgyzstan) Bishkek	Cancelled due to the COVID-19 pandemic					
2021	(Kyrgyzstan) Bishkek	Cancelled due to the COVID-19 pandemic					
2022	(Kyrgyzstan) Bishkek	45th place (1st in Division IV)	4	4	0	0	0
2023	(Bosnia and Herzegovina) Sarajevo	46th place (1st in Division III B)	5	5	0	0	0
2024	(Kyrgyzstan) Bishkek	42nd place 2nd (in Division III A)	5	4	0	0	1
2025	(Turkey) Istanbul	41st place (1st in Division III A)	5	5	0	0	0
2026	(Bulgaria) Sofia	39th place (5th in Division II B)	5	1	0	1	3
2027	(Kyrgyzstan) Bishkek	(Division II B)					
Total			29	20	0	1	8

=== Asian Winter Games ===
Year	Host	Result	Pld	W	OTW	OTL	L	GF	GA	GD
1986-2007	did not participate									
2011	(Kazakhstan) Astana	6th place (1st in Premier Division)	6	6	0	0	0	95	23	+72
2017	(Japan) Sapporo	12th place (2nd in Division II)	4	3	0	0	1	25	14	+11
2025	(China) Harbin	7th place (1st in Group B)	5	2	2	0	1	55	35	+20
Total		3/9	15	11	2	0	2	175	72	+103

=== Challenge Cup of Asia ===
Year	Host	Result	Pld	W	OTW	OTL	L
2008 through 2013		did not participate					
2014	(Kyrgyzstan) Bishkek	8th place (2nd in Division I)	5	4	0	0	1
2015	Kuwait City	8th place (3rd in Division I)	5	3	0	0	2
2016	(Kyrgyzstan) Bishkek	6th place (1st in Division I)	4	4	0	0	0
2017 through 2020		did not participate					
Total			14	11	0	0	3

== All-time record against other nations ==
Last match update: 11 February 2025

Key
Positive balance (more Wins)
Negative balance (more Losses)
Neutral balance (Wins = Losses)

Team	GP	W	T	L	GF	GA
Bahrain	2	2	0	0	44	10
Bosnia and Herzegovina	3	2	0	1	25	9
Hong Kong	3	2	0	1	18	12
Iceland	1	0	0	1	4	9
India	4	4	0	0	42	6
Iran	2	2	0	0	31	1
Israel	1	0	0	1	4	5
Kuwait	6	4	0	2	46	26
Luxembourg	2	2	0	0	12	6
Macau	3	2	0	1	15	7
Malaysia	5	5	0	0	82	13
Mexico	1	1	0	0	9	4
Mongolia	1	1	0	0	13	3
Oman	1	1	0	0	7	3
Philippines	1	1	0	0	10	5
Qatar	2	2	0	0	16	2
Romania	1	0	0	1	2	18
Singapore	5	4	0	1	48	11
South Africa	1	1	0	0	10	1
South Korea	1	0	0	1	0	20
Thailand	3	1	0	2	19	18
Turkmenistan	4	2	0	2	22	18
United Arab Emirates	3	3	0	0	30	8
Total	55	41	0	14	501	214
