= Islamic Republic of Iran Skating Federation =

Sports governing body in Iran

Iran
- Association name: Islamic Republic of Iran Skating Federation
- IIHF Code: IRI
- IIHF membership: 26 September 2019
- President: Majid Honarjoo

The Islamic Republic of Iran Skating Federation (IRISF) (Persian: فدراسیون اسکیت جمهوری اسلامی ایران) is the governing body of ice hockey, inline hockey and roller sports in Iran.

== History ==
The IRISF was accepted into the International Ice Hockey Federation (IIHF) on 26 September 2019. The IRISF has been a full member of the IIHF, as well as a member of World Skate.

== See also ==
- Ice hockey in Iran
- Iran men's national ice hockey team
- Iran men's national inline hockey team
