= Ice hockey in Iran =

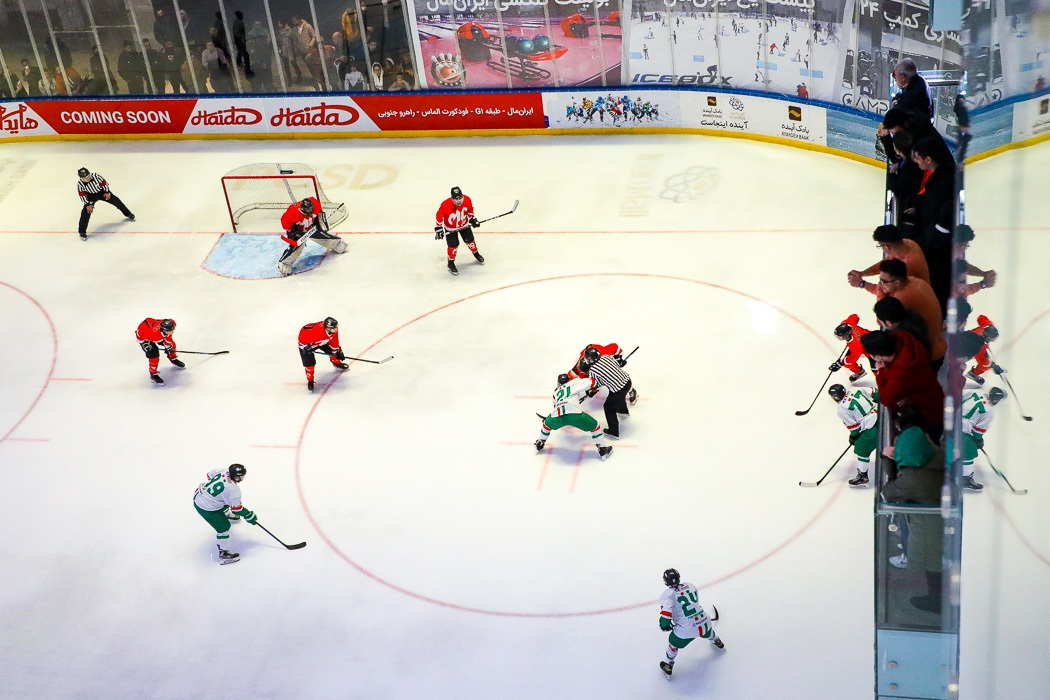
- Iran men's ice hockey league in 2023
- Country: Iran
- Governing body: Islamic Republic of Iran Skating Federation
- National team(s): Men's national team
- First played: 2016

Ice hockey is a relatively new sport in Iran but has experienced growing popularity in recent years. Although it was played recreationally before the 1979 Iranian Revolution, the sport was banned shortly afterward and remained inactive for decades. Its revival began in the 2010s, culminating in the first officially sanctioned game held on October 1, 2016, between Padideh Shandiz and Khorasan Razavi at the Padideh Ice Rink in Mashhad.

== History ==
=== National team ===
Alongside the return of domestic play, Iran established its men's national team in June 2016. The team played its first international game on February 18, 2017, against Macau, losing 7–1. Iran was initially set to participate in the 2017 Asian Winter Games in Sapporo, Japan, but was disqualified due to player eligibility issues. However, the Olympic Council of Asia allowed Iran to compete in its scheduled matches as exhibitions, with results not counting toward official standings.

Iran has also made significant strides in promoting women’s ice hockey by establishing a national women’s team, marking an important milestone in the country’s evolving sports landscape. This initiative not only provides structured training and competition opportunities for female athletes but also symbolizes a broader commitment to advancing gender equality in sports. The creation of the team allows women to participate in a sport traditionally dominated by men and helps challenge social and cultural barriers that have historically limited female involvement in athletic pursuits.
