= Singapore men's national ice hockey team =

Singapore
- Association: Singapore Ice Hockey Association
- General manager: Greg O'Brien
- Head coach: Robert Martini
- Captain: Wee Chew
- Most games: Daniel Wee (87)
- Top scorer: Joshua Chan (33)
- Most points: Wee Chew (70)
- IIHF code: SGP
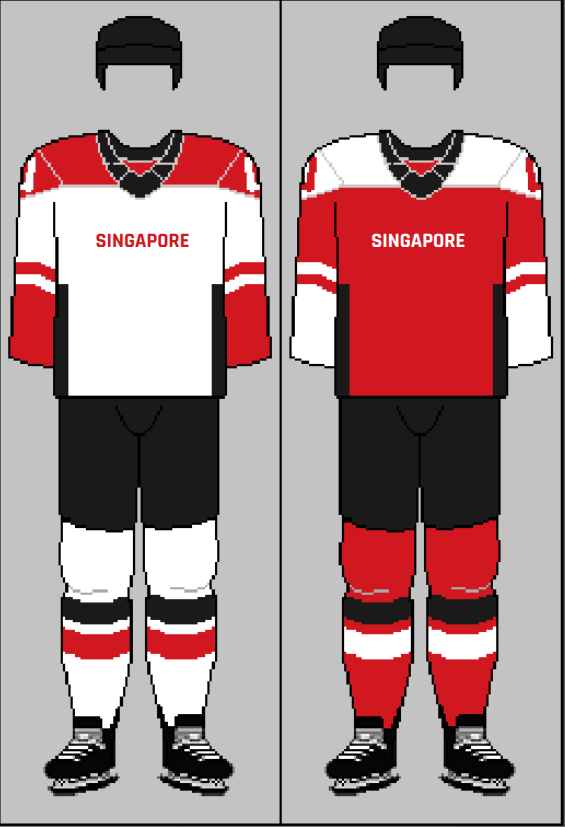

Ranking
- Current IIHF: 52 (▼2) (3 June 2026)
- Highest IIHF: 50 (2025)
- Lowest IIHF: 55 (2021–22)

First international
- Singapore 4–0 Macau (Hong Kong, China; 24 March 2008)

Biggest win
- Singapore 20–1 Bahrain (Harbin, China; 3 February 2025)

Biggest defeat
- Mexico 18–1 Singapore (Querétaro, Mexico; 30 April 2025)

IIHF World Championships
- Appearances: 4 (first in 2022)
- Best result: 47th (2022)

Asian Winter Games
- Appearances: 1 (first in 2017)
- Best result: 10th (2017)

Southeast Asian Games
- Appearances: 2 (first in 2017)
- Best result: 2nd (2019)

IIHF Challenge Cup of Asia
- Appearances: 6 (first in 2008)
- Best result: 4th (2017)

International record (W–L–T)
- 28–59–3

The Singapore national ice hockey team is the national men's ice hockey team of Singapore. The team is controlled by the Singapore Ice Hockey Association and a member of the International Ice Hockey Federation (IIHF) since 2 May 1996. As of 2025, Singapore is ranked 50th in the IIHF World Ranking and 15th in the Asian ranking.

Singapore made its World Championship debut in 2022, and has also played in the Challenge Cup of Asia, a regional tournament for lower-tier hockey national teams in Asia. Until the 2024 Division III Group B tournament, they are unable to participate in the IIHF World Championship tournament in 2025 due to the JCube Ice Rink (the only indoor Olympic-size ice rink in the city-state) closed in 2023, and cannot meet their minimum participation standards.

== Tournament record ==
=== World Championship ===
- 2021 – All lower division tournaments cancelled due to the COVID-19 pandemic
- 2022 – 47th place (3rd in Division IV, promoted to Division III B)
- 2023 – 49th place (4th in Division III B)
- 2024 – 51st place (5th in Division III B)
- 2025 – 52nd place (6th in Division III B, relegated to Division IV)
- 2026 - Cancelled due to the 2026 Iran War

=== Asian Winter Games ===
- 2025 – 11th place

== All-time record against other national teams ==
As of 18 December 2025

Key
Positive balance (more Wins)
Neutral balance (Wins = Losses)
Negative balance (more Losses)

Team	GP	W	T	L	GF	GA
Bahrain	1	1	0	0	20	1
Bosnia and Herzegovina	2	0	0	2	4	17
Chinese Taipei	3	0	0	3	4	27
Hong Kong	7	0	1	6	11	50
India	6	6	0	0	55	11
Indonesia	5	3	0	2	25	21
Iran	3	2	0	1	21	12
Kuwait	5	2	0	3	15	21
Kyrgyzstan	5	1	0	4	11	48
Macau	6	3	1	2	20	13
Malaysia	13	7	1	3	79	38
Mexico	1	0	0	1	1	18
Mongolia	8	0	0	8	10	69
North Korea	2	0	0	2	5	21
Oman	1	1	0	0	12	3
Philippines	10	1	0	9	25	68
Thailand	10	1	0	9	7	89
United Arab Emirates	4	0	0	4	6	30
Total	92	28	3	59	331	557
