= Skenderija =

Cultural, sports and trade center in Sarajevo

- Skenderija
- Skenderija skyline
- Interactive map of Skenderija
- Location: Sarajevo, Bosnia and Herzegovina
- Coordinates: 43°51′17.31″N 18°24′50.5″E

Construction
- Opened: 29 November 1969; 56 years ago

Website
- http://www.skenderija.ba/

Skenderija is a cultural, sports and trade centre located in Sarajevo, Bosnia and Herzegovina. In boasts an area of 70,000 square meters, with multipurpose halls for various sports, with concert and cultural venues, and with trade areas which include the outdoor square. Additionally, a modern shopping centre called "Privredni grad" (English: Trade City) with numerous confectionery shops, restaurants, coffee bars, and other spaces is located at the underground level. Some of the venues include Dom Mladih, Ars Aevi, and Mirza Delibašić Hall.

== History ==
In the late 1960s, the rapidly expanding city of Sarajevo lacked an exhibition-and-sports centre, so municipal authorities approved the plan to build the new Skenderija centre. It was opened on 29 November 1969 by hosting a première of the film Battle of Neretva.

The name Skenderija, which means "Skender's place", refers to the Bosnian Sanjak-bey Skender Pasha, a historical figure who, in 1499, had built the first trading centre in Bosnia (with eleven shops), as well as the first Muslim monastery. Skenderija quickly became a well-known across Yugoslavia and frequently hosted major cultural events. One part of Skenderija is a specialized youth club called "Dom mladih" (The Youth House). Before the Bosnian War, this was one of the modernist and most western-styled clubs in all of Yugoslavia. It was a very popular place among young people, with some of the Balkan pop-music stars, such as Dino Merlin, having started their careers at the club. The building is also home to the biggest mall ever built in former Yugoslavia, called "Privredni grad".

During the bid to host the 1984 Winter Olympics, the organizing committee selected the centre as a venue for the Games. However, as the venue had already become somewhat outdated by that point, a major reconstruction was ordered during which Skenderija was expanded and turned into a state-of-the-art sporting complex. Later, it was also designated to serve as one of the two ice hockey venues, the media centre and the venue for award ceremonies.

In 1992, at the breakout of war in Bosnia and Herzegovina, during the Siege of Sarajevo, the Yugoslav People's Army targeted Skenderija with heavy shelling. The youth centre burned to the ground, while the main structure of the building was mostly undamaged.

After the war, the centre was left abandoned and slowly fell into disrepair. In 1999, the municipal government of Sarajevo decided to rebuild Skenderija into a modern exhibition hall. The reconstruction was financed by many private companies (which now own most of the building) and was completed in 2006. Most of the facility has been restored back to its former glory and the venue is in service as of 2024. It is estimated to have over 500,000 visitors each year.

On 12 February 2012, the roof of the Skating Hall collapsed under the weight of heavy snowfall. The roof had been designed to sustain weight of up to 100 kg per square meter and gave way under estimated 160 kg of snow per square meter on that day.

== Skenderija Bridge ==
The Skenderija Bridge, also known as the Eiffel Bridge, is a historic pedestrian bridge spanning the Miljacka River just outside the main complex. Originally built in 1893 during the Austro-Hungarian era, local lore frequently attributes its distinctive iron design to Gustave Eiffel.
