= Gorodskoi Katok =

Ice rink in Bishkek, Kyrgyzstan

Bishkek Arena
- Бишкек Арена
- Location: Bishkek, Kyrgyzstan
- Capacity: 2,200

Construction
- Groundbreaking: 2020
- Opened: 2021

Tenants
- 2022 IIHF World Championship Division IV; 2024 IIHF World Championship Division III; Kyrgyzstan men's national ice hockey team

The Bishkek Arena (Kyrgyz: Бишкек Арена, romanized: Bişkek Arena) is an indoor arena located in Bishkek, Kyrgyzstan. The capacity of the arena is 2,200 spectators. It is used for ice hockey and figure skating.
