= Farzad Houshidari =

Iranian Ice hockey player

- Born: June 9, 1987 (age 37); Tehran, Iran
- Height: 5 ft 7 in (170 cm)
- Weight: 165 lb (75 kg; 11 st 11 lb)
- Position: Defence
- Shoots: Left
- National team: Iran

Farzad Houshidari (Persian: فرزاد هوشیدری; born September 6, 1987) is an Iranian professional ice hockey defenceman for the Iran men's national inline hockey team and Iran men's national ice hockey team.
