= IIHF World Championship Division IV =

International ice hockey tournament

- Upcoming season or competition: 2027 IIHF World Championship Division IV
- Sport: Ice hockey
- Founded: 2020
- No. of teams: 6
- Most recent champion: Uzbekistan
- Most titles: Kyrgyzstan; Philippines; Mongolia; Uzbekistan (1)
- Promotion to: Division III
- Relegation to: no relegation
- Website: IIHF.com

The IIHF World Championship Division IV is an annual sports event organized by the International Ice Hockey Federation (IIHF). The division has been introduced for the 2020 Men's Ice Hockey World Championships, and forms the lowest level of the IIHF World Championships.

== Results ==
The national team that wins the Division IV championship will be promoted to the following year's Division III B championship, and will be replaced by the team relegated down from Division III B.

Year	Champion and promoted	Runner-up
2020–2021	Cancelled due to the COVID-19 pandemic.	
2022	Kyrgyzstan	Iran
2023	Philippines	Mongolia
2024	Mongolia	Kuwait
2025	Uzbekistan	Armenia
2026	Cancelled due to the 2026 Iran war.	

== Summary of participation ==
Includes participation in Division IV only, see each team's main article to see their results at all levels of past Ice Hockey World Championships.

1 championship participation list announced

Team	Times	First	Last	Gold	Silver	Bronze	Total	Best finish (first/last)	Hosted
Armenia	1	2025		–	1	–	1	Second (in 2025)	1
Indonesia	3	2023	2025	–	–	1	1	Third (in 2024)	0
Iran	2	2022	2025	–	1	–	1	Second (in 2022)	0
Kuwait	4	2022	2025	–	1	2	3	Second (in 2024)	1
Kyrgyzstan	1	2022		1	–	–	1	First (in 2022)	1
Malaysia	3	2023	2025	–	–	–	–	Fourth (in 2022, 2024)	0
Mongolia	2	2023	2024	1	1	–	2	First (in 2024)	1
Philippines	2	2022	2023	1	–	–	1	First (in 2023)	0
Singapore	1	2022		–	–	1	1	Third (in 2022)	0
Uzbekistan	1	2025		1	–	–	1	First (in 2025)	0

== See also ==
- IIHF World Championship Division I
- IIHF World Championship Division II
- IIHF World Championship Division III
- IIHF Asia Cup
- IIHF Development Cup
