= Philippines men's national ice hockey team fixtures and results =

The following is a list of fixtures and results of the Philippines men's national ice hockey team against other national teams as well as foreign club sides. This also includes matches against Philippine-based clubs in tournaments also featuring foreign-based teams.

== Fixtures and results ==
=== Against national teams ===
Against other national Teams
Opponent	Date	Result	Scores by Period	Tournament	Venue
Macau	September 13, 2014	10–0	No information	HKAHC Invitational Amateur Ice Hockey Tournament	Kowloon Bay, Hong Kong
Oman	September 16, 2016	9–0	No information	HKAHC Invitational Amateur Ice Hockey Tournament	Kowloon Bay, Hong Kong
Kyrgyzstan	February 21, 2017	5–10	1–6, 3–1, 1–3	Asian Winter Games	Hoshioki Ice Skating Rink, Sapporo
Qatar	February 23, 2017	14–2	4–1, 5–0, 5–1	Asian Winter Games	Hoshioki Ice Skating Rink, Sapporo
(International Olympic Committee) Independent Olympic Athletes ( Kuwait)	February 24, 2017	8–3	2–2, 4–0, 2–1	Asian Winter Games	Hoshioki Ice Skating Rink, Sapporo
Qatar	February 23, 2017	14–2	4–1, 5–0, 5–1	Asian Winter Games	Hoshioki Ice Skating Rink, Sapporo
Indonesia	August 21, 2017	12–0	1–0, 6–0, 5–0	Southeast Asian Games	Malaysia National Ice Skating Stadium, Kuala Lumpur
Singapore	August 22, 2017	7–2	1–0, 2–2, 4–0	Southeast Asian Games	Malaysia National Ice Skating Stadium, Kuala Lumpur
Malaysia	August 23, 2017	8–7; SO	3–1, 2–3, 2–3; OT: 0–0	Southeast Asian Games	Malaysia National Ice Skating Stadium, Kuala Lumpur
Thailand	August 24, 2017	5–4	3–0, 1–3, 1–1	Southeast Asian Games	Malaysia National Ice Skating Stadium, Kuala Lumpur
Thailand	April 3, 2018	4–7	2–1, 0–3, 2-3	IIHF Challenge Cup of Asia – Top Division	SM Mall of Asia Ice Skating Rink, Pasay
Kuwait	April 5, 2018	13–0	4–0, 6–0, 3–0	IIHF Challenge Cup of Asia – Top Division	SM Mall of Asia Ice Skating Rink, Pasay
Mongolia	April 6, 2018	6–5	3–2, 2–1, 1–2	IIHF Challenge Cup of Asia – Top Division	SM Mall of Asia Ice Skating Rink, Pasay
Singapore	April 8, 2018	15–0	5–0, 6–0, 4–0	IIHF Challenge Cup of Asia – Top Division	SM Mall of Asia Ice Skating Rink, Pasay
Singapore	March 2, 2019	7–4	1–2, 4–1, 2–1	IIHF Challenge Cup of Asia	Malaysia National Ice Skating Stadium, Kuala Lumpur
Malaysia	March 5, 2019	7–4	2–2, 2–2, 3–0	IIHF Challenge Cup of Asia	Malaysia National Ice Skating Stadium, Kuala Lumpur
Mongolia	March 6, 2019	6–3	4–2, 2–1, 0–0	IIHF Challenge Cup of Asia	Malaysia National Ice Skating Stadium, Kuala Lumpur
Singapore	March 8, 2019	6–1	3–0, 2–1, 1–0	IIHF Challenge Cup of Asia	Malaysia National Ice Skating Stadium, Kuala Lumpur
Mongolia	March 9, 2019	3–6	0–3, 1–0, 2–3	IIHF Challenge Cup of Asia	Malaysia National Ice Skating Stadium, Kuala Lumpur
Malaysia	December 1, 2019	15–1	4–0, 6–1, 5–0	Southeast Asian Games	SM Mall of Asia Ice Skating Rink, Pasay
Singapore	December 3, 2019	5–3	0–1, 1–0, 4–2	Southeast Asian Games	SM Mall of Asia Ice Skating Rink, Pasay
Indonesia	December 4, 2019	8–1	2–0, 0–1, 6–0	Southeast Asian Games	SM Mall of Asia Ice Skating Rink, Pasay
Thailand	December 6, 2019	1–10	0–3, 1–4, 0–3	Southeast Asian Games	SM Mall of Asia Ice Skating Rink, Pasay
Singapore	December 7, 2019	3–4	2–0, 0–2, 1–2	Southeast Asian Games	SM Mall of Asia Ice Skating Rink, Pasay
Malaysia	December 7, 2019	17–1	4–0, 7–0, 6–1	Southeast Asian Games	SM Mall of Asia Ice Skating Rink, Pasay
Kyrgyzstan	March 3, 2020	Cancelled	–, –, –	IIHF World Championship – Division IV	Gorodskoi Katok, Bishkek
Kuwait	March 4, 2020	Cancelled	–, –, –	IIHF World Championship – Division IV	Gorodskoi Katok, Bishkek
Malaysia	March 5, 2020	Cancelled	–, –, –	IIHF World Championship – Division IV	Gorodskoi Katok, Bishkek
Indonesia	March 23, 2023	14–0	4–0, 6–0, 4–0	IIHF World Championship – Division IV	Steppe Arena, Ulaanbaatar
Mongolia	March 25, 2023	7–6	3–0, 0–3, 3–3; OT: 1–0	IIHF World Championship – Division IV	Steppe Arena, Ulaanbaatar
Kuwait	March 26, 2023	14–0	1–0, 4–0, 9–0	IIHF World Championship – Division IV	Steppe Arena, Ulaanbaatar
Singapore	February 23, 2024	6–3	0–0, 2–2, 4–1	IIHF World Championship – Division III	Skenderija, Sarajevo
Iran	February 24, 2024	14–2	7–0, 2–1, 5–1	IIHF World Championship – Division III	Skenderija, Sarajevo
Bosnia and Herzegovina	February 26, 2024	3–6	0–2, 1–2, 2–2	IIHF World Championship – Division III	Skenderija, Sarajevo
North Korea	February 27, 2024	2–10	1–2, 0–7, 1–1	IIHF World Championship – Division III	Skenderija, Sarajevo
Hong Kong	February 29, 2024	5–9	1–3, 3–3, 1–3	IIHF World Championship – Division III	Skenderija, Sarajevo
Mongolia	April 27, 2025	7–13	3–6, 3–4, 1–3	IIHF World Championship – Division III	Lakeside Ice Park, Querétaro
Mexico	April 28, 2025	1–9	1–4, 0–3, 0–2	IIHF World Championship – Division III	Lakeside Ice Park, Querétaro
Hong Kong	April 30, 2025	2–17	1–6, 0–7, 1–4	IIHF World Championship – Division III	Lakeside Ice Park, Querétaro
North Korea	May 2, 2025	5–6	1–1, 3–2, 1–2; OT: 0–1	IIHF World Championship – Division III	Lakeside Ice Park, Querétaro
Singapore	May 3, 2025	7–1	1–0, 1–0, 5–1	IIHF World Championship – Division III	Lakeside Ice Park, Querétaro

=== Against club and other teams ===
Against club and other teams
Opponent	Date	Result	Scores by Period	Tournament	Venue
(Canada) Delta Police	September 24, 2005	0–12	No information	HKAHC Invitational Amateur Ice Hockey Tournament	Kowloon Bay, Hong Kong
(Hong Kong) HKAHC Black	September 24, 2005	2–3	No information	HKAHC Invitational Amateur Ice Hockey Tournament	Kowloon Bay, Hong Kong
(Hong Kong) HKAHC Blue	September 24, 2005	0–8	No information	HKAHC Invitational Amateur Ice Hockey Tournament	Kowloon Bay, Hong Kong
(Philippines) Manila Predators	September 25, 2005	0–15	No information	HKAHC Invitational Amateur Ice Hockey Tournament	Kowloon Bay, Hong Kong
(Hong Kong) HKAIH Troopers	September 12, 2014	3–1	No information	HKAHC Invitational Amateur Ice Hockey Tournament	Kowloon Bay, Hong Kong
(Chinese Taipei) Taipei Selects	September 12, 2014	1–2	No information	HKAHC Invitational Amateur Ice Hockey Tournament	Kowloon Bay, Hong Kong
(Japan) Hama Club	September 13, 2014	4–1	No information	HKAHC Invitational Amateur Ice Hockey Tournament	Kowloon Bay, Hong Kong
(Japan) Hama Club	September 14, 2014	4–1	No information	HKAHC Invitational Amateur Ice Hockey Tournament	Kowloon Bay, Hong Kong
(Hong Kong) Sammi's Superstar	May 5, 2015	4–2	No information	Hong Kong 5s	Kowloon Bay, Hong Kong
(Hong Kong) Hockey Panda	May 5, 2015	15–0	No information	Hong Kong 5s	Kowloon Bay, Hong Kong
(Hong Kong) Ice Wolves	May 6, 2015	4–1	No information	Hong Kong 5s	Kowloon Bay, Hong Kong
(Hong Kong) Sammi's Superstar	May 7, 2015	5–4	No information	Hong Kong 5s	Kowloon Bay, Hong Kong
(Japan) Tokyo Mavericks	May 8, 2015	1–3	No information	Hong Kong 5s	Kowloon Bay, Hong Kong
(Mongolia) UB Capital	September 18, 2015	6–1	No information	HKAHC Invitational Amateur Ice Hockey Tournament	Kowloon Bay, Hong Kong
(Hong Kong) HKAHC Giants	September 19, 2015	7–0	No information	HKAHC Invitational Amateur Ice Hockey Tournament	Kowloon Bay, Hong Kong
(United Arab Emirates) UAE Storm	September 19, 2015	4–1	No information	HKAHC Invitational Amateur Ice Hockey Tournament	Kowloon Bay, Hong Kong
(Japan) Mitsubishi Corp.	September 19, 2015	4–6	No information	HKAHC Invitational Amateur Ice Hockey Tournament	Kowloon Bay, Hong Kong
(Japan) Mitsubishi Corp.	September 20, 2015	3–1	No information	HKAHC Invitational Amateur Ice Hockey Tournament	Kowloon Bay, Hong Kong
Chinese Taipei U20	September 16, 2016	2–1	No information	HKAHC Invitational Amateur Ice Hockey Tournament	Kowloon Bay, Hong Kong
(Hong Kong) HKAHC Giants	September 17, 2016	2–1	No information	HKAHC Invitational Amateur Ice Hockey Tournament	Kowloon Bay, Hong Kong
(Japan) Mitsubishi Corp.	September 17, 2016	1–3	No information	HKAHC Invitational Amateur Ice Hockey Tournament	Kowloon Bay, Hong Kong
(Japan) Mitsubishi Corp.	September 18, 2016	3–4	No information	HKAHC Invitational Amateur Ice Hockey Tournament	Kowloon Bay, Hong Kong
(Hong Kong) HK Hitman	November 24, 2016	8–0	No information	Philippines Ice Hockey Tournament	Metro Manila
(Philippines) PH Islanders Red	November 24, 2016	8–1	No information	Philippines Ice Hockey Tournament	Metro Manila
Batax Indonesia	November 25, 2016	3–1	No information	Philippines Ice Hockey Tournament	Metro Manila
(Philippines) PH Islanders Red	November 26, 2016	11–1	No information	Philippines Ice Hockey Tournament	Metro Manila
(Hong Kong) HK Hitman	November 26, 2016	8–1	No information	Philippines Ice Hockey Tournament	Metro Manila
(South Korea) Seoul Thunder	June 14, 2017	3–2	1–1, 1–?, 1–?	Philippines Ice Hockey Tournament	Mandaluyong, Metro Manila
Chinese Taipei U20	June 15, 2017	3–2; SO	0–0, 2–2, 0–0; OT: 0–0	Philippines Ice Hockey Tournament	Mandaluyong, Metro Manila
Singapore Sting	June 16, 2017	5–4	No information	Philippines Ice Hockey Tournament	Mandaluyong, Metro Manila
(United States) Islanders Red	June 17, 2017	1–4	No information	Philippines Ice Hockey Tournament	Mandaluyong, Metro Manila
(Canada) Royal Canadian Navy	September 30, 2023	17-6	No information	Friendship Game	Pasay, Metro Manila
Win Loss

== All-time record against other national teams ==
Last match update: February 29, 2024

Key
Positive balance (more Wins)
Neutral balance (Wins = Losses)
Negative balance (more Losses)

Team	GP	W	T	L	GF	GA
Bosnia and Herzegovina	1	0	0	1	3	6
Hong Kong	1	0	0	1	5	9
Indonesia	3	3	0	0	34	1
Iran	1	1	0	0	14	2
Kuwait	3	3	0	0	35	3
Kyrgyzstan	1	0	0	1	5	10
Macau	1	1	0	0	10	0
Malaysia	4	4	0	0	47	13
Mongolia	4	3	0	1	23	21
Oman	1	1	0	0	9	0
North Korea	1	0	0	1	2	10
Qatar	2	2	0	0	28	4
Singapore	7	6	0	1	49	17
Thailand	3	1	0	2	10	21
Total	32	25	0	7	269	108
