= Ice hockey in the Philippines =

- Country: Philippines
- Governing body: Federation of Ice Hockey League
- National team(s): Men's national team; women's national team
- Registered players: 131 (2018)
- Clubs: 5 (2016)

National competitions
- Philippine Hockey League

International competitions
- Asian Winter Games; IIHF Challenge Cup of Asia; Southeast Asian Games

Ice hockey in the Philippines is among the winter sports played in the Southeast Asian nation. Due to its climate, ice hockey in the Philippines are limited to artificial ice rinks often hosted inside shopping malls. The Federation of Ice Hockey League maintains both a men's and a women's national team.

== History ==
The history of ice hockey in the Philippines began with the ice rinks set up in shopping malls in the country which were initially only used for recreational activities. The film Mighty Ducks released in the 1990s helped promote the winter sport in the country, with most members of the 2017 national team citing the film as their inspiration in taking up the sport.

The governing body of ice hockey in the country, the Federation of Ice Hockey League (FIHL), was formed years later in February 2015. The FIHL was admitted as an associate member of the International Ice Hockey Federation (IIHF) on 20 May 2016 and secured Philippine Olympic Committee membership by July 2016.

A IIHF sanctioned league, the Philippine Hockey League was organized in 2018 fulfilling a prerequisite for the Philippine men's national team participation in the Ice Hockey World Championships.

== National and international competitions ==
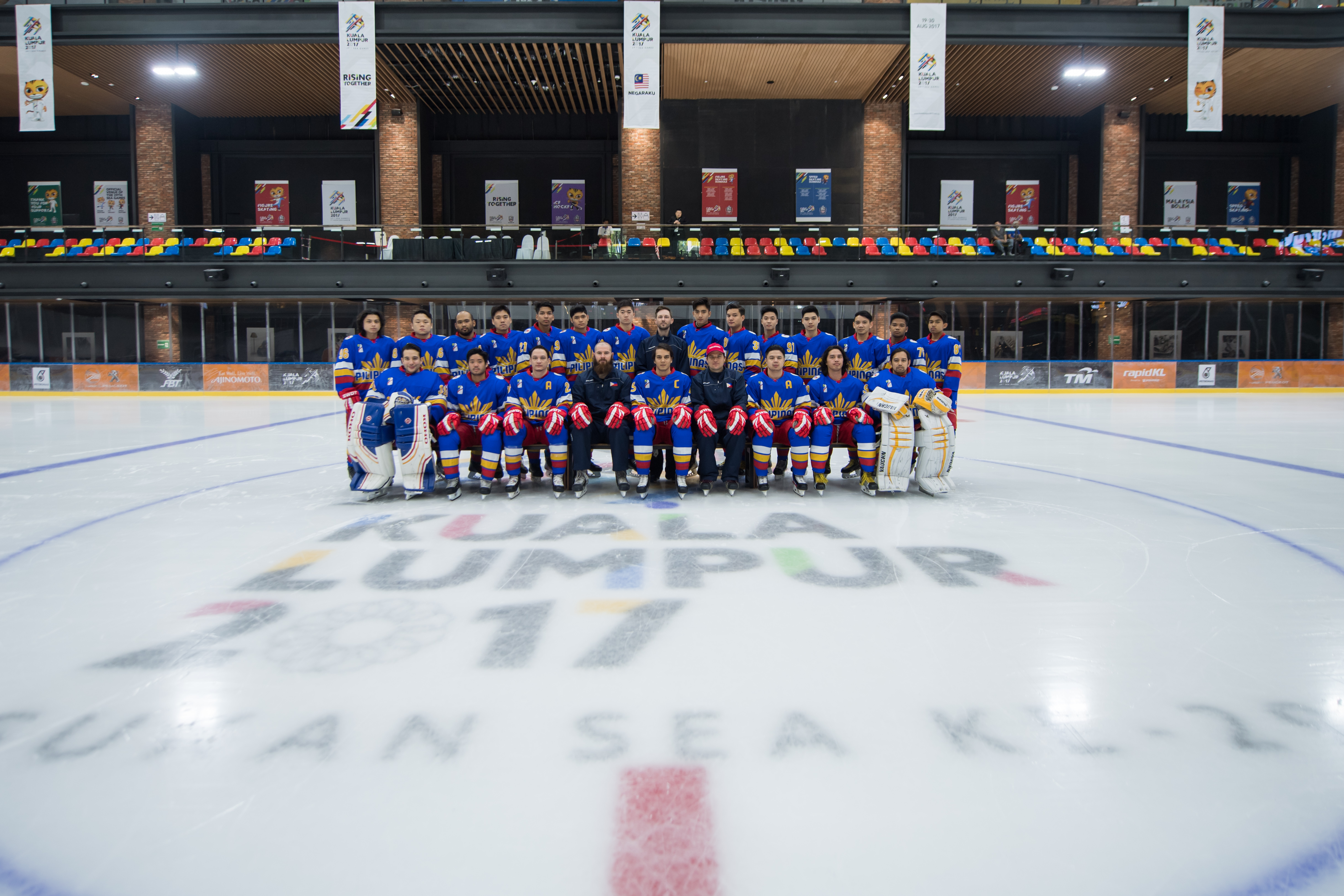
The men's national ice hockey team which competed at the 2017 Southeast Asian Games in Kuala Lumpur.

Prior to 2008 and before the formation of the FIHL, club selection teams competed in regional competitions as unofficial national teams.

After the formation of the FIHL, national ice hockey teams were officially organized. The men's national team made their official debut at the 2017 Asian Winter Games while the women's team made theirs at the 2017 IIHF Women's Challenge Cup of Asia.

The main league in the country is the Philippine Hockey League which follows IIHF regulations. A recreational ice hockey league, the Manila Ice Hockey League, is also held.

== Participation rates ==
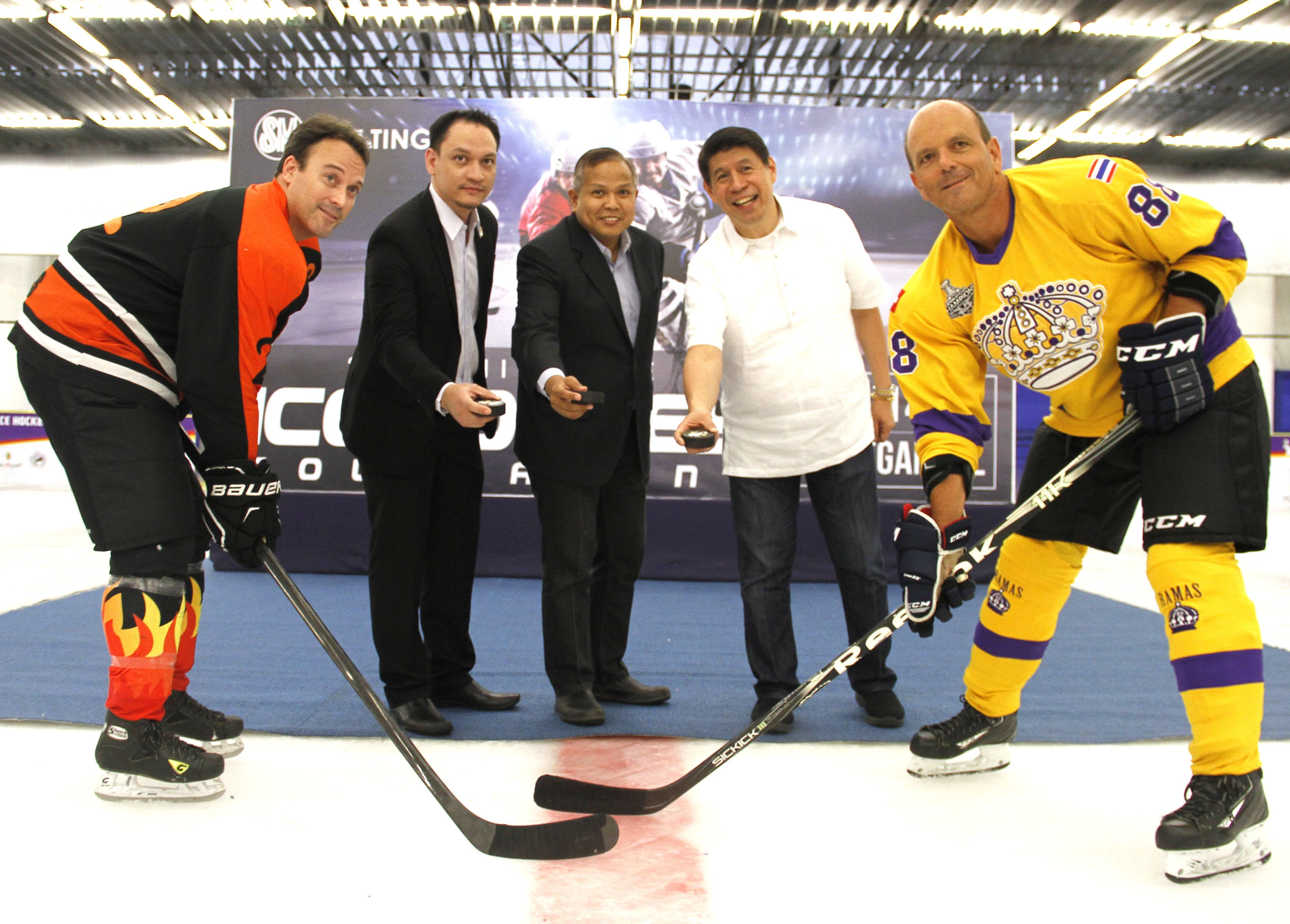
Opening of the 2017 Philippine International Ice Hockey Tournament in Mandaluyong.

Since the Philippines is a tropical country with no winter season, ice hockey and some other winter sports are played on artificial ice rinks. In 2016, there were 211 registered players from five clubs in the country. Despite increasing popularity, the expenses involved in playing the sport hinder its adoption rate.

The FIHL plans to introduce the ice hockey in schools through field hockey, a similar sport.

== Ice rinks ==
As of 2016, there are four ice rinks in the country, all part of shopping malls:

- SM Mall of Asia Ice Skating Rink - Pasay
- SM Megamall Ice Skating Rink - Mandaluyong
- SM Southmall Ice Skating Rink - Las Piñas
- SM Seaside City Cebu Ice Skating Rink - Cebu City

== Tournaments hosted ==
The following are IIHF-sanctioned ice hockey tournaments hosted in the Philippines.

- 2018 IIHF Challenge Cup of Asia
- 2019 Southeast Asian Games – ice hockey tournament
