= 2020 IIHF Challenge Cup of Asia =

Tournament details
- Host country: Singapore
- Venue(s): 1 (in 1 host city)
- Dates: 27 April–1 May 2020
- Teams: 6

The 2020 IIHF Challenge Cup of Asia was to be the 13th edition of the IIHF Challenge Cup of Asia, an annual international ice hockey tournament held by the International Ice Hockey Federation (IIHF). The tournament was scheduled to take place from 27 April to 1 May 2020 in Singapore but was cancelled due to the COVID-19 pandemic. Singapore was selected to host the tournament for the first time. The 2019 fourth-place finishers Malaysia would not participate for the first time since the 2014 edition and was to make their World Championship debut in the inaugural Division IV of the 2020 World Championship, but the Division IV tournament was cancelled due to the coronavirus pandemic. India was to return after a one-year absence, bringing the number of participants reduced from seven to six teams.

== Participants ==
Team	2019 Results
Mongolia	Won gold medal last year.
Philippines	Won silver medal last year.
Singapore	Host, won bronze medal last year.
Indonesia	Finished 5th place last year.
Macau	Finished 6th place last year.
India	Did not participate last year. Last participation in 2018.
