= Ice hockey at the SEA Games =

- Sport: Ice hockey
- Founded: 2017
- Most recent champions: Men: Indonesia (1st title); Women: Thailand (1st title)
- Most titles: Men: Indonesia; Thailand; Philippines (1 title each)

Ice hockey events at the Southeast Asian Games was first held at the 2017 edition in Kuala Lumpur, Malaysia.

== History ==
In 2015, the South East Asian Games Federation approved Malaysia's proposal to introduce ice hockey and ice skating to the Southeast Asian Games. The 2017 Southeast Asian Games which was hosted by Malaysia was the first edition of the games where winter sports, including ice hockey, was contested. The Philippines won the first ice hockey gold medal.

Ice hockey is expected to be contested again in the 2019 edition which will be hosted by the Philippines. Malaysia has requested the Philippines to introduce a women's ice hockey event to the games. The hosts complied with Malaysia's request but a total of three nations only expressed their interest to participate in a women's tournament a team short in order for women's hockey to be a medal event.

Ice hockey is set to return to the 2025 edition, after not being held in the 2021 and 2023 editions, with a women's tournament also to be held for the first time.

== Summary ==
=== Men ===
#	Year	Champion	Second place	Third place	Fourth place	Host city	Host country
1	2017	Philippines (1)	Thailand	Malaysia	Singapore	Kuala Lumpur	Malaysia
2	2019	Thailand (1)	Singapore	Philippines	Malaysia	Pasay	Philippines
3	2025	Indonesia (1)	Thailand	Philippines	Singapore	Bangkok	Thailand

=== Women ===
#	Year	Champion	Second place	Third place	Fourth place	Host city	Host country
1	2025	Thailand (1)	Philippines	Singapore	Malaysia	Bangkok	Thailand

== Medal table ==
Rank	Nation	Gold	Silver	Bronze	Total
1	Thailand (THA)	1	2	0	3
2	Philippines (PHI)	1	0	2	3
3	Indonesia (INA)	1	0	0	1
4	Singapore (SGP)	0	1	0	1
5	Malaysia (MAS)	0	0	1	1
Totals (5 entries)		3	3	3	9

== Participating nations ==
=== Men's ===
Team	(Malaysia) 2017	(Philippines) 2019	(Thailand) 2025	Years
Indonesia	5th	5th	1st	3
Malaysia	3rd	4th	5th	3
Philippines	1st	3rd	3rd	3
Singapore	4th	2nd	4th	3
Thailand	2nd	1st	2nd	3

=== Women's ===
Team	(Thailand) 2025	Years
Malaysia	4th	1
Philippines	2nd	1
Singapore	3rd	1
Thailand	1st	1

== See also ==
- Indoor hockey at the SEA Games
