= 2020 World Ice Hockey Championships =

2020 World Ice Hockey Championships may refer to:

- 2020 Men's World Ice Hockey Championships
- 2020 IIHF World Championship
- 2020 World Junior Ice Hockey Championships
- 2020 IIHF World U18 Championships
