= Václav Drábek =

Czech ice hockey player

- Born: October 31, 1976 (age 49) Třinec, Czechoslovakia
- Height: 5 ft 11 in (180 cm)
- Weight: 183 lb (83 kg; 13 st 1 lb)
- Position: Forward
- Shot: Right
- Played for: HC Železárny Třinec; BK Mladá Boleslav
- Playing career: 1994–2018

Václav Drábek (born October 31, 1976) is a Czech former professional ice hockey defenceman.

Drábek played 35 games in the Czech Extraliga for HC Želeárny Třinec and BK Mladá Boleslav. He also played in the United Kingdom's National Ice Hockey League for the London Raiders, Wightlink Raiders and Streatham IHC.

In February 2026, Drábek became head coach of the Philippines men's national ice hockey team and released again after six months.
