= Federation of Ice Hockey League =

Ice hockey governing body of the Philippines

Philippines
- Association name: Federation of Ice Hockey League, Inc.
- IIHF Code: PHI
- Founded: February 2015
- IIHF membership: May 20, 2016
- President: Christoph Sy
- IIHF men's ranking: 54
- IIHF women's ranking: N/A

The Federation of Ice Hockey League, Inc. (FIHL), also known as Hockey Philippines, is the national governing body for the sport of ice hockey in the Philippines. It handled the formation of the Philippine national team.

The FIHL was formed in February 2015, and was later admitted as an associate member of the International Ice Hockey Federation (IIHF) on May 20, 2016.

By July 2016, the federation had gained membership in the Philippine Olympic Committee (POC). The FIHL became a voting member of the POC in July 2020.

== Leagues ==
- Philippine Hockey League (2018–present)
- Philippine Minor Hockey League (2018–present)

== National teams ==
- Men's national team
- Men's U20 national team
- Women's national team
