= 2021 Men's Ice Hockey World Championships =

International ice hockey tournament

Map of the countries participating at the 2021 IIHF World Championship

The 2021 Men's Ice Hockey World Championships was the 84th such event hosted by the International Ice Hockey Federation. Due to the ongoing COVID-19 pandemic, only teams in the championship division participated in this year's tournament. The competition served as a qualification tournament for the top (only) division placements in the 2022 competition.

After all events were cancelled in 2020, all teams remained in their respective divisions. Singapore was scheduled to be the newest national team to participate and has been assigned to Division IV. On 18 November 2020, the IIHF announced that they had cancelled the tournaments for Divisions I, II, III and IV due to the COVID-19 pandemic. The Championship Division was held from 21 May to 6 June.

== Championship (Top Division) ==
The tournament was held in Riga, Latvia from 21 May to 6 June 2021. Minsk, Belarus was originally scheduled to be a co-host, but in January 2021, the IIHF chose to remove Belarus as the host, due to security concerns.

Pos	Grp	Team	Pld	W	OTW	OTL	L	GF	GA	GD	Pts	Final result
1	B	Canada	10	4	2	1	3	28	23	+5	17	Champions
2	B	Finland	10	6	2	2	0	24	14	+10	24	Runners-up
3	B	United States	10	8	0	0	2	35	14	+21	24	Third place
4	B	Germany	10	4	1	0	5	27	24	+3	14	Fourth place
5	A	ROC	8	5	1	1	1	29	12	+17	18	Eliminated in Quarter-finals
6	A	Switzerland	8	5	0	1	2	29	20	+9	16	Eliminated in Quarter-finals
7	A	Czech Republic	8	3	2	0	3	27	19	+8	13	Eliminated in Quarter-finals
8	A	Slovakia	8	4	0	0	4	18	28	−10	12	Eliminated in Quarter-finals
9	A	Sweden	7	3	0	1	3	21	14	+7	10	Eliminated in Group stage
10	B	Kazakhstan	7	2	2	0	3	22	18	+4	10	Eliminated in Group stage
11	B	Latvia (H)	7	2	0	3	2	15	16	−1	9	Eliminated in Group stage
12	A	Denmark	7	2	1	1	3	13	15	−2	9	Eliminated in Group stage
13	B	Norway	7	2	1	0	4	17	21	−4	8	Eliminated in Group stage
14	A	Great Britain	7	1	0	1	5	13	31	−18	4	Eliminated in Group stage
15	A	Belarus	7	1	0	1	5	10	29	−19	4	Eliminated in Group stage
16	B	Italy	7	0	0	0	7	11	41	−30	0	Eliminated in Group stage

Source: IIHF
Rules for classification: 1) position in the group; 2) number of points; 3) goal difference; 4) goals scored; 5) seeding before tournament.
(H) Host

== Division I ==
=== Group A ===
The tournament was scheduled to be held in Ljubljana, Slovenia from 9 to 15 May 2021.

- Austria
- France
- Hungary
- Romania
- Slovenia
- South Korea

=== Group B ===
The tournament was scheduled to be held in Katowice, Poland from 26 April to 2 May 2021.

- Estonia
- Japan
- Lithuania
- Poland
- Serbia
- Ukraine

== Division II ==
=== Group A ===
The tournament was scheduled to be held in Beijing, China from 10 to 16 April 2021.

- Australia
- China
- Croatia
- Israel
- Netherlands
- Spain

=== Group B ===
The tournament was scheduled to be held in Reykjavík, Iceland from 18 to 24 April 2021.

- Belgium
- Bulgaria
- Georgia
- Iceland
- Mexico
- New Zealand

== Division III ==
=== Group A ===
The tournament was scheduled to be held in Kockelscheuer, Luxembourg from 18 to 24 April 2021.

- Chinese Taipei
- Luxembourg
- North Korea
- Turkey
- Turkmenistan
- United Arab Emirates

=== Group B ===
The tournament was scheduled to be held in Cape Town, South Africa from 19 to 25 April 2021.

- Bosnia and Herzegovina
- Hong Kong
- South Africa
- Thailand

== Division IV ==
The tournament was scheduled to be held in Bishkek, Kyrgyzstan from 3 to 5 March 2021.

- Kuwait
- Kyrgyzstan
- Malaysia
- Philippines
- Singapore
