= 2025 Men's Ice Hockey World Championships =

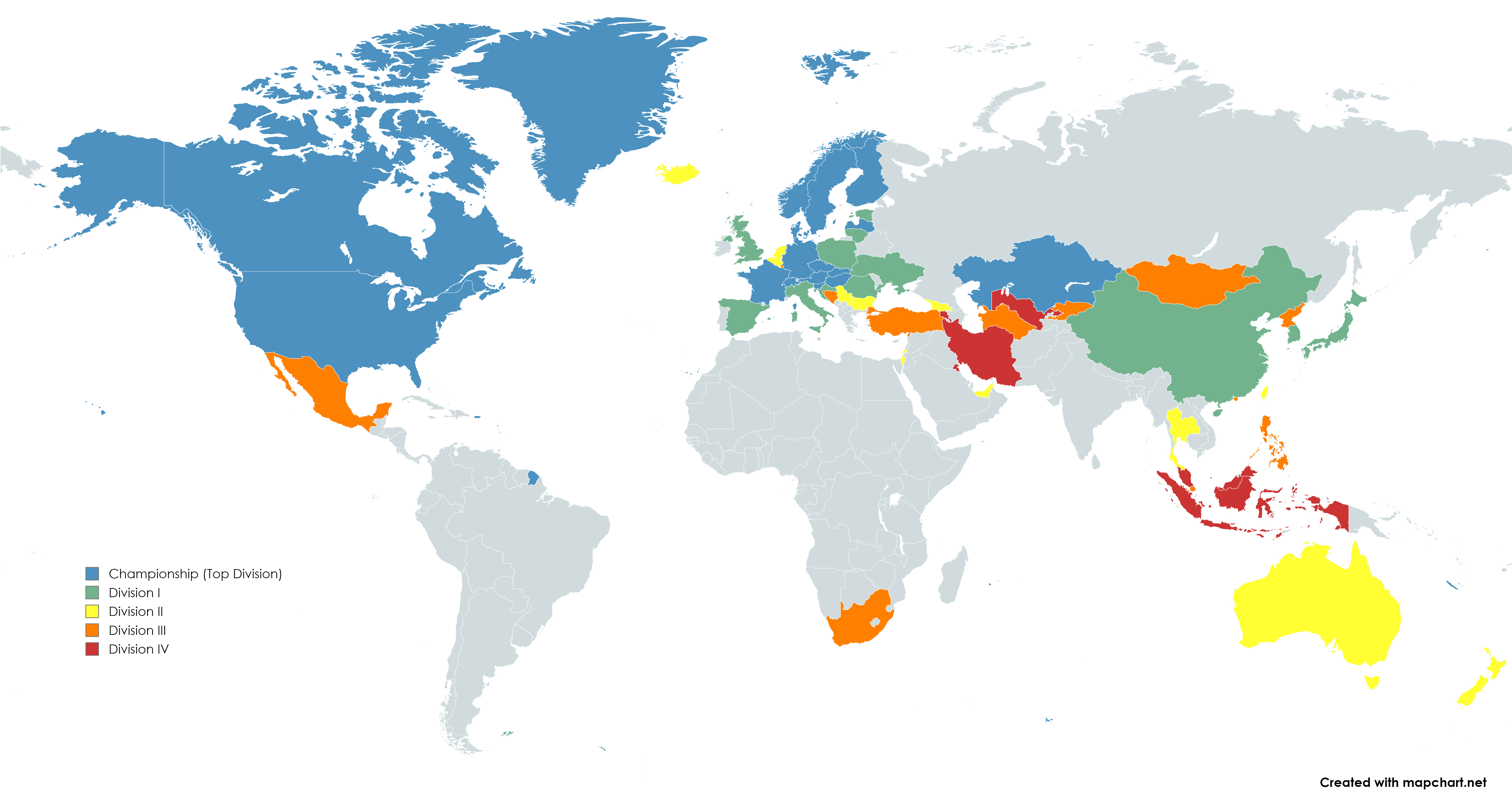
Map of the countries participating at the 2025 IIHF World Championship

The 2025 Men's Ice Hockey World Championships were the 88th such event hosted by the International Ice Hockey Federation. Teams participated at several levels of competition based on their 2024 results. The competition also served as qualifications for division placements in the 2026 edition.

As in 2024, teams from Russia and Belarus have not been allowed to enter, as they remained suspended by the IIHF due to the countries' invasion of Ukraine.

== Championship (Top Division) ==
The tournament was held in Stockholm, Sweden and Herning, Denmark, from 9 to 25 May 2025.

=== Group A ===
Pos	Team	Pld	W	OTW	OTL	L	GF	GA	GD	Pts	Qualification or relegation
1	Canada	7	6	0	1	0	34	7	+27	19	Quarterfinals
2	Sweden (H)	7	6	0	0	1	28	8	+20	18	Quarterfinals
3	Finland	7	4	2	0	1	22	10	+12	16	Quarterfinals
4	Austria	7	2	2	0	3	21	18	+3	10	Quarterfinals
5	Latvia	7	3	0	0	4	17	25	−8	9	Qualified for the 2026 IIHF World Championship
6	Slovakia	7	2	0	1	4	9	24	−15	7	Qualified for the 2026 IIHF World Championship
7	Slovenia	7	1	0	1	5	9	29	−20	4	Qualified for the 2026 IIHF World Championship
8	France	7	0	0	1	6	8	27	−19	1	Relegated to the 2026 Division I A

Source: IIHF
Rules for classification: 1) points; 2) head-to-head points; 3) head-to-head goal difference; 4) head-to-head number of goals scored; 5) result against closest best-ranked team outside tied teams; 6) result against second-best-ranked team outside tied teams; 7) seeding before tournament
(H) Host

=== Group B ===
Pos	Team	Pld	W	OTW	OTL	L	GF	GA	GD	Pts	Qualification or relegation
1	Switzerland	7	6	0	1	0	34	9	+25	19	Quarterfinals
2	United States	7	5	1	0	1	34	14	+20	17 (Note: Czechia 2–5 United States)	Quarterfinals
3	Czechia	7	5	1	0	1	35	14	+21	17	Quarterfinals
4	Denmark (H)	7	3	1	0	3	25	24	+1	11	Quarterfinals
5	Germany	7	3	0	1	3	20	22	−2	10	Qualified for the 2026 IIHF World Championship
6	Norway	7	1	0	1	5	13	24	−11	4	Qualified for the 2026 IIHF World Championship
7	Hungary	7	1	0	0	6	8	39	−31	3 (Note: Kazakhstan 2–4 Hungary)	Qualified for the 2026 IIHF World Championship
8	Kazakhstan	7	1	0	0	6	9	32	−23	3	Relegated to the 2026 Division I A

Source: IIHF
Rules for classification: 1) points; 2) head-to-head points; 3) head-to-head goal difference; 4) head-to-head number of goals scored; 5) result against closest best-ranked team outside tied teams; 6) result against second-best-ranked team outside tied teams; 7) seeding before tournament
(H) Host

=== Bracket ===
Quarter-finals
22 May
1A Canada	1
4B Denmark	2
22 May
1B Switzerland	6
4A Austria	0
22 May
2A Sweden	5
3B Czechia	2
22 May
2B United States	5
3A Finland	2

Semi-finals
24 May
2 Switzerland	7
7 Denmark	0
24 May
3 Sweden	2
4 United States	6

Final
25 May
2 Switzerland	0
4 United States(OT)	1
Third place
25 May
3 Sweden	6
7 Denmark	2

=== Final standings ===
Teams finishing fifth in the preliminary round were ranked ninth and tenth, teams finishing sixth were ranked 11th and 12th, and so on.

Pos	Grp	Team	Pld	W	OTW	OTL	L	GF	GA	GD	Pts	Final result
1	B	United States	10	7	2	0	1	46	18	+28	25	Champions
2	B	Switzerland	10	8	0	2	0	47	10	+37	26	Runners-up
3	A	Sweden (H)	10	8	0	0	2	41	18	+23	24	Third place
4	B	Denmark (H)	10	4	1	0	5	29	38	−9	14	Fourth place
5	A	Canada	8	6	0	1	1	35	9	+26	19	Eliminated in Quarterfinals
6	B	Czechia	8	5	1	0	2	37	19	+18	17	Eliminated in Quarterfinals
7	A	Finland	8	4	2	0	2	24	15	+9	16	Eliminated in Quarterfinals
8	A	Austria	8	2	2	0	4	21	24	−3	10	Eliminated in Quarterfinals
9	B	Germany	7	3	0	1	3	20	22	−2	10	Eliminated in Preliminary round
10	A	Latvia	7	3	0	0	4	17	25	−8	9	Eliminated in Preliminary round
11	A	Slovakia	7	2	0	1	4	9	24	−15	7	Eliminated in Preliminary round
12	B	Norway	7	1	0	1	5	13	24	−11	4	Eliminated in Preliminary round
13	A	Slovenia	7	1	0	1	5	9	29	−20	4	Eliminated in Preliminary round
14	B	Hungary	7	1	0	0	6	8	39	−31	3	Eliminated in Preliminary round
15	B	Kazakhstan	7	1	0	0	6	9	32	−23	3	Relegated to the 2026 IIHF World Championship Division I
16	A	France	7	0	0	1	6	8	27	−19	1	Relegated to the 2026 IIHF World Championship Division I

Source: IIHF
Rules for classification: 1) position in the group; 2) number of points; 3) goal difference; 4) goals scored; 5) seeding before tournament.
(H) Host

== Division I ==
=== Group A ===
The tournament was held in Sfântu Gheorghe, Romania from 27 April to 3 May 2025.

Pos	Team	Pld	W	OTW	OTL	L	GF	GA	GD	Pts	Promotion or relegation
1	Great Britain	5	2	3	0	0	19	9	+10	12	Promoted to the 2026 Top Division
2	Italy	5	3	0	1	1	18	11	+7	10	Promoted to the 2026 Top Division
3	Ukraine	5	2	1	1	1	16	10	+6	9	
4	Japan	5	2	0	1	2	14	16	−2	7	
5	Poland	5	2	0	0	3	8	13	−5	6	
6	Romania (H)	5	0	0	1	4	6	22	−16	1	Relegated to the 2026 Division I B

Source: IIHF
Rules for classification: 1) points; 2) head-to-head points; 3) head-to-head goal difference; 4) head-to-head number of goals scored; 5) result against closest best-ranked team outside tied teams; 6) result against second-best ranked team outside tied teams; 7) seeding before tournament.
(H) Host

=== Group B ===
The tournament was held in Tallinn, Estonia from 26 April to 2 May 2025.

Pos	Team	Pld	W	OTW	OTL	L	GF	GA	GD	Pts	Promotion or relegation
1	Lithuania	5	4	1	0	0	14	3	+11	14	Promoted to the 2026 Division I A
2	South Korea	5	4	0	0	1	21	11	+10	12	
3	Estonia (H)	5	3	0	0	2	19	9	+10	9	
4	China	5	1	1	0	3	9	14	−5	5	
5	Spain	5	0	1	1	3	9	25	−16	3	
6	Croatia	5	0	0	2	3	9	19	−10	2	Relegated to the 2026 Division II A

Source: IIHF
Rules for classification: 1) points; 2) head-to-head points; 3) head-to-head goal difference; 4) head-to-head number of goals scored; 5) result against closest best-ranked team outside tied teams; 6) result against second-best ranked team outside tied teams; 7) seeding before tournament.
(H) Host

== Division II ==
=== Group A ===
The tournament was scheduled to be held in Melbourne, Australia from 27 April to 3 May 2025. It was later moved to Serbia and held from 29 April to 5 May.

Pos	Team	Pld	W	OTW	OTL	L	GF	GA	GD	Pts	Promotion or relegation
1	Netherlands	5	5	0	0	0	25	4	+21	15	Promoted to the 2026 Division I B
2	Serbia (H)	5	4	0	0	1	12	5	+7	12	
3	United Arab Emirates	5	2	0	0	3	14	13	+1	6 (Note: United Arab Emirates 8–0 Belgium)	
4	Belgium	5	2	0	0	3	5	17	−12	6	
5	Australia	5	1	0	0	4	7	17	−10	3 (Note: Israel 3–4 Australia)	
6	Israel	5	1	0	0	4	9	16	−7	3	Relegated to the 2026 Division II B

Source: IIHF
Rules for classification: 1) points; 2) head-to-head points; 3) head-to-head goal difference; 4) head-to-head number of goals scored; 5) result against closest best-ranked team outside tied teams; 6) result against second-best ranked team outside tied teams; 7) seeding before tournament.
(H) Host

=== Group B ===
The tournament was held in Dunedin, New Zealand from 27 April to 3 May 2025.

Pos	Team	Pld	W	OTW	OTL	L	GF	GA	GD	Pts	Promotion or relegation
1	Georgia	5	4	1	0	0	35	9	+26	14	Promoted to the 2026 Division II A
2	Iceland	5	4	0	0	1	21	13	+8	12	
3	New Zealand (H)	5	3	0	0	2	14	14	0	9	
4	Bulgaria	5	1	1	1	2	23	26	−3	6	
5	Chinese Taipei	5	1	0	1	3	14	16	−2	4	
6	Thailand	5	0	0	0	5	11	40	−29	0	Relegated to the 2026 Division III A

Source: IIHF
Rules for classification: 1) points; 2) head-to-head points; 3) head-to-head goal difference; 4) head-to-head number of goals scored; 5) result against closest best-ranked team outside tied teams; 6) result against second-best ranked team outside tied teams; 7) seeding before tournament.
(H) Host

== Division III ==
=== Group A ===
The tournament was held in Istanbul, Turkey from 21 to 27 April 2025.

Pos	Team	Pld	W	OTW	OTL	L	GF	GA	GD	Pts	Promotion or relegation
1	Kyrgyzstan	5	5	0	0	0	27	5	+22	15	Promoted to the 2026 Division II B
2	Turkmenistan	5	3	1	0	1	20	18	+2	11	
3	Turkey (H)	5	3	0	0	2	19	8	+11	9	
4	South Africa	5	1	0	1	3	12	24	−12	4	
5	Bosnia and Herzegovina	5	1	0	0	4	12	16	−4	3 (Note: Luxembourg 2–6 Bosnia and Herzegovina)	
6	Luxembourg	5	1	0	0	4	10	29	−19	3	Relegated to the 2026 Division III B

Source: IIHF
Rules for classification: 1) points; 2) head-to-head points; 3) head-to-head goal difference; 4) head-to-head number of goals scored; 5) result against closest best-ranked team outside tied teams; 6) result against second-best ranked team outside tied teams; 7) seeding before tournament.
(H) Host

=== Group B ===
The tournament was held in Santiago de Querétaro, Mexico from 27 April to 3 May 2025.

Pos	Team	Pld	W	OTW	OTL	L	GF	GA	GD	Pts	Promotion or relegation
1	Mexico (H)	5	5	0	0	0	48	12	+36	15	Promoted to the 2026 Division III A
2	North Korea	5	3	1	0	1	38	23	+15	11	
3	Hong Kong	5	3	0	0	2	42	19	+23	9	
4	Mongolia	5	2	0	0	3	36	29	+7	6	
5	Philippines	5	1	0	1	3	22	46	−24	4	
6	Singapore	5	0	0	0	5	4	61	−57	0	Relegated to the 2026 Division IV

Source: IIHF
Rules for classification: 1) points; 2) head-to-head points; 3) head-to-head goal difference; 4) head-to-head number of goals scored; 5) result against closest best-ranked team outside tied teams; 6) result against second-best ranked team outside tied teams; 7) seeding before tournament.
(H) Host

== Division IV ==
The tournament was held in Yerevan, Armenia from 13 to 19 April 2025.

Pos	Team	Pld	W	OTW	OTL	L	GF	GA	GD	Pts	Promotion
1	Uzbekistan	5	4	0	1	0	79	10	+69	13	Promoted to the 2026 Division III B
2	Armenia (H)	5	3	1	1	0	53	11	+42	12	
3	Kuwait	5	3	1	0	1	56	32	+24	11	
4	Indonesia	5	2	0	0	3	17	60	−43	6	
5	Iran	5	1	0	0	4	6	42	−36	3	
6	Malaysia	5	0	0	0	5	20	76	−56	0	

Source: IIHF
Rules for classification: 1) points; 2) head-to-head points; 3) head-to-head goal difference; 4) head-to-head number of goals scored; 5) result against closest best-ranked team outside tied teams; 6) result against second-best ranked team outside tied teams; 7) seeding before tournament.
(H) Host
