= Philippines men's national ice hockey team =

Philippines
- Association: Hockey Philippines
- General manager: Imelda Regencia (susp.)
- Head coach: vacant
- Assistants: vacant
- Captain: Steven Füglister
- Most games: Lenard Lancero (47)
- Top scorer: Steven Füglister (65)
- Most points: Steven Füglister (124)
- Team colors
- IIHF code: PHI
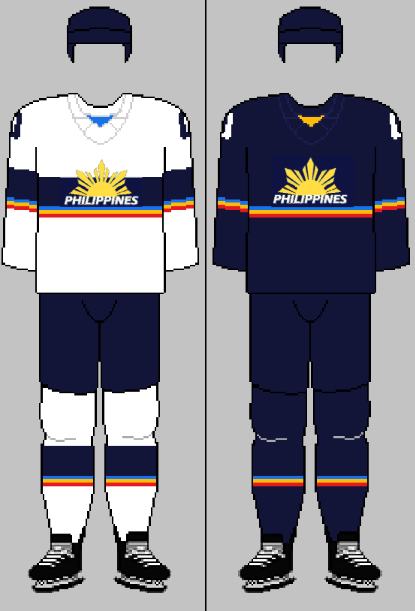

Ranking
- Current IIHF: 51 ▼2 (3 June 2026)
- Highest IIHF: 49 (2025)
- Lowest IIHF: 55 (2023)

First international
- Philippines 10–0 Macau (Kowloon Bay, Hong Kong; 13 September 2014)

Biggest win
- Philippines 17–1 Malaysia (Pasay, Philippines; 8 December 2019)

Biggest defeat
- Uzbekistan 28–3 Philippines (Hong Kong, China; 14 April 2026)

IIHF World Championships
- Appearances: 4 (first in 2023)
- Best result: 50th (2024)

Asian Winter Games
- Appearances: 1 (first in 2017)
- Best result: 13th (2017)

IIHF Challenge Cup of Asia
- Appearances: 2 (first in 2018)
- Best result: 2nd (2019)

Southeast Asian Games
- Appearances: 2 (first in 2017)
- Best result: 1st (2017)

International record (W–L–T)
- 29–20–0

Medal record

Challenge Cup of Asia
Silver medal – second place	2019 Kuala Lumpur	
Bronze medal – third place	2018 Pasay	

Southeast Asian Games
Gold medal – first place	2017 Kuala Lumpur	Team
Bronze medal – third place	2019 Pasay	Team
Bronze medal – third place	2025 Bangkok	Team

The Philippines national ice hockey team is the national men's ice hockey team of the Philippines. It is governed by the Federation of Ice Hockey League (FIHL), which has been a member of the International Ice Hockey Federation (IIHF) since May 20, 2016. Prior to that, a national team competed in regional tournaments in Hong Kong starting in the 2000s.

The Philippines is currently ranked 52nd in the IIHF World Ranking and 18th in the specialized ranking of Asian teams. The team has participated in the World Championship since 2023. The team has also competed in the IIHF Challenge Cup of Asia, a regional tournament for lower-tier hockey nations in Asia.

== History ==
=== Early history ===
Prior to 2008, there were no organized leagues, and an unofficial Philippine national team composed of players from selected clubs participated in regional tournaments. One such unofficial national team, "Manila Pilipinas," competed in the HKAHC Invitational Amateur Ice Hockey Tournament in 2005. They finished as second runners-up in the Bauhinia Division, the lowest of the three divisions in the invitational tournament.

Starting in 2008, ice hockey in the Philippines began to gain traction. The Philippine national team returned to the HKAHC invitational tournament in 2014, where they won the Silver Plate Division, the second highest division of the event. During the same tournament, the Philippines played against another national side and won 10–0 against a Macau squad, sanctioned by the Macau Ice Sports Federation.

The Federation of Ice Hockey League (FIHL), a national governing body for ice hockey in the Philippines, was established in February 2015. Its formation made efforts to organize a formal national team more structured.

=== 2016: FIHL affiliation ===
The FIHL became an associate member of the IIHF on 20 May 2016, and by July 2016, the federation also became a member of the Philippine Olympic Committee (POC). FIHL's membership in these organizations allowed it to send national teams, including the men's national team, to official tournaments such as the IIHF Asia and Oceania Championship (formerly the IIHF Challenge Cup of Asia) and the Southeast Asian Games.

The Philippine national team returned to the HKAHC Invitational Amateur Ice Hockey Tournament in 2016. They finished as first runner-up after losing 4–3 in overtime to Mitsubishi Corp. in the Gold Plate Division final. The team also faced the Oman national team during the tournament.

=== Official FIHL tournament debut ===
The Philippine national team participated in the 2017 Asian Winter Games, which marked their first official tournament. They competed in Division II of the tournament. The team, captained by Swiss-Filipino Steven Füglister, underwent seven months of training, beginning in July 2016, in preparation for the competition.

The team lost 10–5 in their first official match against Kyrgyzstan. The Philippines secured their first official win as a FIHL member by defeating Qatar with a score of 14–2, followed by an 8–3 triumph over Kuwait, which competed as the Independent Olympic Athletes. The team placed third in their division after a 9–2 win over Macau in the play-off for third place.

=== 2017 Southeast Asian Games ===
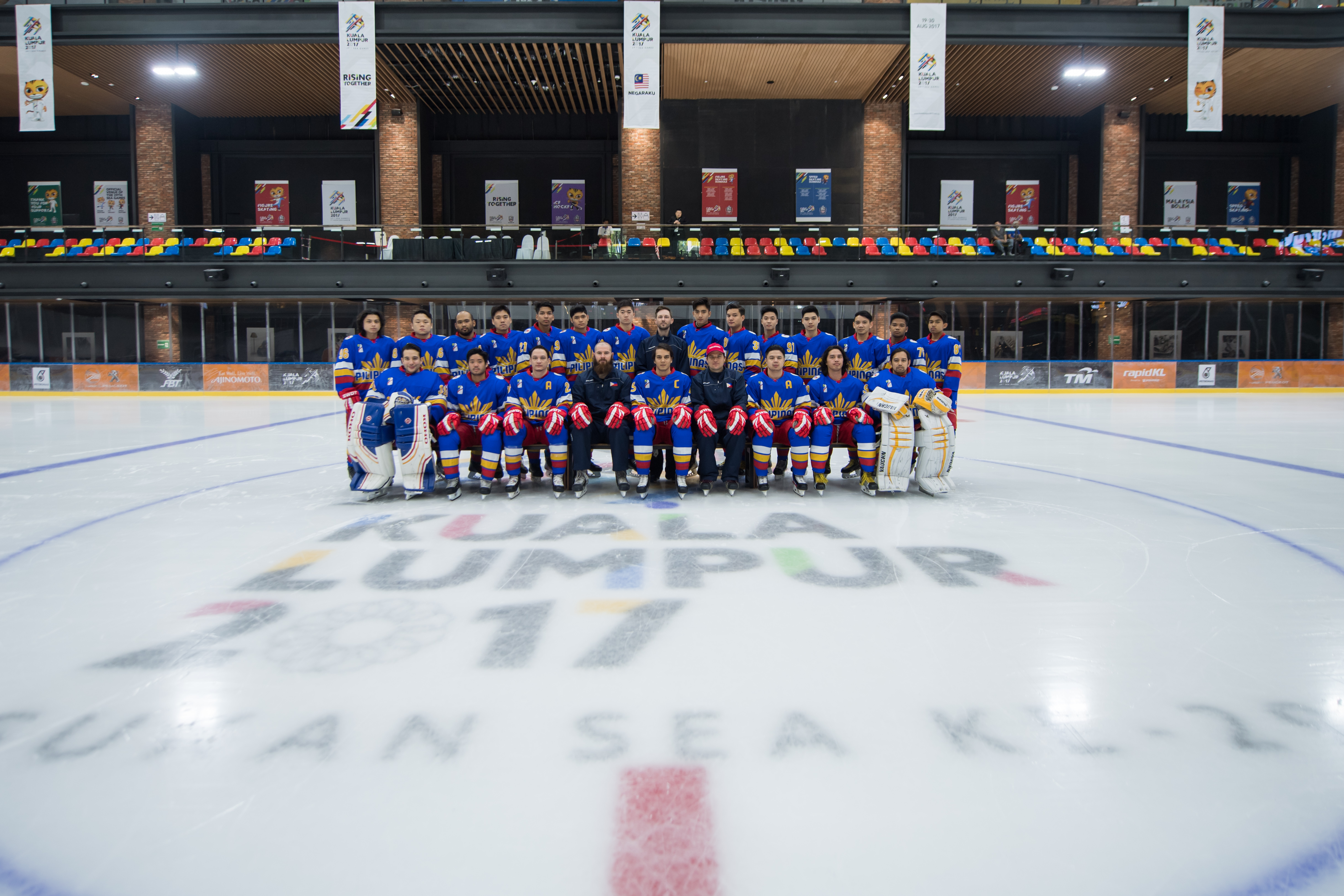
The Philippines national team at the 2017 SEA Games.

The Philippines participated at an ice hockey tournament event of the 2017 Southeast Asian Games. To prepare for the tournament, they participated at the 2017 Philippine Ice Hockey Tournament which was held at the SM Megamall Skating Rink in Mandaluyong. The national team finished third behind second placed New York-based Islanders Red and first placed Singaporean side Pandoo Nation.

The Philippine national team mentored by Czech head coach Daniel Brodan started their Southeast Asian Games campaign with a 12–0 victory over Indonesia. This was followed by their game against Singapore which ended with a 7–2 triumph.

This was then followed by their game against Malaysia which saw the ejection of the Philippine captain, Steven Füglister from the game in the first period. He was given a game misconduct penalty for hitting a Malaysian player in a head while pursuing the puck although the skipper said the infraction was an unintentional accident. The match ended with a 7–7 tie after regulation time after an extra five-minute-period which led to a shootout. The Philippines outscored Malaysia to register a win.

The Malaysian organizers decided to suspend Fuglister for the final match against Thailand. The Philippines appealed this decision but failed to overturn the suspension. Despite playing sans their captain, the Philippines wrapped up their campaign, undefeated with a 5–4 win over Thailand and clinched the first ever ice hockey gold medal in the history of the regional tournament.

=== 2018 and 2019 IIHF Challenge Cup of Asia ===
The Philippines hosted the Top Division of the IIHF Challenge Cup of Asia from 3 to 8 April 2018, their first IIHF-sanctioned tournament, at the SM Mall of Asia Ice Skating Rink in Pasay, Metro Manila. The team was mentored by American head coach, Jonathan De Castro. The national team settled for bronze after tying in points with champions Mongolia and runners-up Thailand. Goal differences of the three teams with matches against the two other teams, Kuwait and Singapore, disregarded was used as tiebreaker to determine the final standing. The national team improved its best finish in the tournament in the following edition of the tournament in 2019 hosted in Malaysia. They lost to Mongolia in the final settling for second place.

=== 2019 Southeast Asian Games ===
The Philippines failed to defend their Southeast Asian Games title at home in the 2019 edition of the regional games settling for a bronze medal finish.

Kaspersky, an internet security firm, sponsored their participation in the regional games.

=== IIHF World Championships ===
The Philippines' ice hockey governing body, the Federation of Ice Hockey League, from 2017, projects the national team's first participation in the IIHF World Championships within three to five years. They have applied to participate in the inaugural Division IV of the World Championships for the 2020 edition. However the tournament was cancelled due to the COVID-19 pandemic. The 2021 Division IV tournament would also get cancelled. The Philippines' debut in the World Championship would be further postponed, after it withdrew from the 2022 Division IV tournament citing inability to train due to closure of ice rinks in the past two years due to the pandemic.

By August 2022, ice rinks have reopened and in October 2022, Finnish instructor Juhani Ijäs has been appointed as head coach and program director of the Philippine national team.

They would finally make their World Championship debut by taking part in the 2023 Division IV tournament in Mongolia. They swept all three games against Indonesia, the hosts, and Kuwait to earn a promotion to Division III.

== Tournament record ==
=== World Championships ===
Year	Host	Result	Pld	W	OTW	OTL	L
1930 through 2015		Not an IIHF member					
2016 through 2019		did not enter					
2020	(Kyrgyzstan) Bishkek	Cancelled due to the COVID-19 pandemic (was to enter Division IV)					
2021	(Kyrgyzstan) Bishkek	All lower division tournaments cancelled due to the COVID-19 pandemic (was to enter Division IV)					
2022	(Kyrgyzstan) Bishkek	Withdrew due to the COVID-19 pandemic (was to enter Division IV)					
2023	(Mongolia) Ulaanbaatar	52nd place (1st in Division IV)	3	2	1	0	0
2024	(Bosnia and Herzegovina) Sarajevo	50th place (4th in Division III B)	5	2	0	0	3
2025	(Mexico) Queretaro	51st place (5th in Division III B)	5	1	0	1	3
2026	Hong Kong	52nd place (6th in Division III B)	5	0	0	0	5
Total		4/4	18	5	1	1	11

=== Asian Winter Games ===
Year	Host	Result	Pld	W	OTW	OTL	L
1986 through 2011		did not enter					
2017	(Japan) Sapporo	13th place (3rd in Division II)	4	3	0	0	1
2025	(China) Harbin	did not qualify					
Total		1/1	4	3	0	0	1

=== Challenge Cup of Asia ===
Year	Host	Result	Pld	W	OTW	OTL	L
2008 through 2017		did not participate					
2018	(Philippines) Pasay	3rd Place	4	3	0	0	1
2019	(Malaysia) Kuala Lumpur	2nd Place	5	4	0	0	1
2020	Singapore	Cancelled due to the COVID-19 pandemic					
Total		2/12	9	7	0	0	2

=== SEA Games ===
Year	Host	Result	Pld	W	OTW	OTL	L
2017	(Malaysia) Kuala Lumpur	1st place	4	3	1	0	0
2019	(Philippines) Pasay	3rd Place	6	4	0	0	2
2025	(Thailand) Bangkok	3rd Place	6	2	0	0	4
Total		3/3	16	9	1	0	6

== Team ==
=== Current roster ===
Roster for the 2025 IIHF World Championship Division III B.

Head coach: (Finland) Juhani Ijäs

No.	Pos.	Name	Height	Weight	Birthdate	Club
1	G	Irell Perez	1.68 m (5 ft 6 in)	74 kg (163 lb)	10 June 1984 (aged 39)	(Philippines) Mustangs
2	D	LR Lancero	1.72 m (5 ft 8 in)	72 kg (159 lb)	2 July 1995 (aged 27)	(Philippines) Manila Hawks
3	F	Kenwrick Sze	1.82 m (6 ft 0 in)	96 kg (212 lb)	13 December 2004 (aged 18)	(Philippines) Krazy to the Max
6	F	John Glenn Lagleva	1.65 m (5 ft 5 in)	52 kg (115 lb)	6 June 2004 (aged 18)	(Philippines) Mustangs
7	F	Carl Montano	1.75 m (5 ft 9 in)	98 kg (216 lb)	11 September 1983 (aged 39)	(Philippines) Manila Hawks
8	D	Patrick Syquiatco	1.70 m (5 ft 7 in)	80 kg (180 lb)	25 April 1995 (aged 30)	(Philippines) Manila Hawks
11	D	Jann So Tiong	1.78 m (5 ft 10 in)	89 kg (196 lb)	1 February 2002 (aged 21)	(Philippines) Mustangs
12	D	Einzenn Ham	1.85 m (6 ft 1 in)	90 kg (200 lb)	16 December 2003 (aged 19)	(Philippines) Mustangs
16	F	Patrick Daniel Abis	1.72 m (5 ft 8 in)	66 kg (146 lb)	28 September 2003 (aged 19)	(Philippines) Manila Hawks
18	F	Jan Aro Regencia	1.68 m (5 ft 6 in)	58 kg (128 lb)	18 October 2000 (aged 22)	(Philippines) Krazy to the Max
20	F	Carlo Angelo Tigaronita	1.66 m (5 ft 5 in)	80 kg (180 lb)	8 July 2002 (aged 20)	(Philippines) Manila Hawks
22	D	Dan Carlo Pastrana	1.71 m (5 ft 7 in)	60 kg (130 lb)	9 May 2005 (aged 19)	(Philippines) Manila Hawks
23	F	Kenneth Stern	1.75 m (5 ft 9 in)	78 kg (172 lb)	25 April 1988 (aged 35)	(Philippines) Manila Hawks
24	D	Eishner Jigsmac Sibug	1.73 m (5 ft 8 in)	72 kg (159 lb)	14 April 1999 (aged 23)	(Philippines) Mustangs
25	F	Steven Füglister	1.85 m (6 ft 1 in)	90 kg (200 lb)	25 January 1986 (aged 37)	(Philippines) Manila Hawks
30	G	Gianpietro Iseppi	1.83 m (6 ft 0 in)	90 kg (200 lb)	24 April 1982 (aged 40)	(Philippines) Manila Hawks
61	D	Manvil Billones	1.73 m (5 ft 8 in)	75 kg (165 lb)	1 November 1993 (aged 29)	(Philippines) Mustangs
91	F	Jorell Crisostomo	1.70 m (5 ft 7 in)	63 kg (139 lb)	25 April 2000 (aged 22)	(Philippines) Manila Hawks
96	F	BJ Imperial	1.75 m (5 ft 9 in)	80 kg (180 lb)	25 April 1999 (aged 23)	(Philippines) Manila Hawks

=== Coaching history ===
Year	Coach	GC	W	OTW	OTL	L	Pts
2017	(Czech Republic) Daniel Brodan	8	6	1	0	1	20
2018	(United States) Jonathan De Castro	5	4	0	0	1	12
2019	(Czech Republic) Daniel Brodan	11	8	0	0	3	24
2022–2026	(Finland) Juhani Ijäs	13	5	1	1	7	17
2026–2026	(Czech Republic) Václav Drábek	5	0	0	0	5	0

== Fixtures and results ==
Against other national teams
Opponent	Date	Score	Scores by period	Tournament	Host venue
Mongolia	April 27, 2025	7–13	3–6, 3–4, 1–3	IIHF World Championship – Division III	Lakeside Ice Park, Querétaro
Mexico	April 28, 2025	1–9	1–4, 0–3, 0–2	IIHF World Championship – Division III	Lakeside Ice Park, Querétaro
Hong Kong	April 30, 2025	2–17	1–6, 0–7, 1–4	IIHF World Championship – Division III	Lakeside Ice Park, Querétaro
North Korea	May 2, 2025	5–6	1–1, 3–2, 1–2; OT: 0–1	IIHF World Championship – Division III	Lakeside Ice Park, Querétaro
Singapore	May 3, 2025	7–1	1–0, 1–0, 5–1	IIHF World Championship – Division III	Lakeside Ice Park, Querétaro

== All-time record against other national teams ==
Last match update: 3 May 2025

Key
Positive balance (more Wins)
Neutral balance (Wins = Losses)
Negative balance (more Losses)

Team	GP	W	T	L	GF	GA
Bosnia and Herzegovina	1	0	0	1	3	6
Hong Kong	2	0	0	2	7	26
Indonesia	3	3	0	0	34	1
Iran	1	1	0	0	14	2
Kuwait	3	3	0	0	35	3
Kyrgyzstan	1	0	0	1	5	10
Macau	1	1	0	0	10	0
Malaysia	4	4	0	0	47	13
Mongolia	5	3	0	2	30	34
Mexico	1	0	0	1	1	9
Oman	1	1	0	0	9	0
North Korea	2	0	0	2	7	16
Qatar	2	2	0	0	28	4
Singapore	8	7	0	1	56	18
Thailand	3	1	0	2	10	21
Total	38	26	0	12	296	163
