= 2021 IIHF World Championship Division IV =

Tournament details
- Host country: Kyrgyzstan
- Venue: 1 (in 1 host city)
- Dates: 3–5 March (cancelled)
- Teams: 6

The 2021 IIHF World Championship Division IV was scheduled to be an international ice hockey tournament run by the International Ice Hockey Federation.

The tournament would have been held in Bishkek, Kyrgyzstan from 3 to 5 March 2021.

On 18 November 2020, the tournament was cancelled due to the COVID-19 pandemic.

Malaysia, Philippines, Iran and Singapore were all scheduled to debut in the world championships.

== Planned participants ==
Team	Qualification
Kuwait	Placed 5th in Division III Q in 2019.
Kyrgyzstan	Host, placed 6th in Division III Q in 2019.
Malaysia	Was supposed to be the first time participating in tournament.
Philippines	Was supposed to be the first time participating in tournament.
Singapore	Was supposed to be the first time participating in tournament.
Iran	Was supposed to be the first time participating in tournament.

== Standings ==
Pos	Team	Pld	W	OTW	OTL	L	GF	GA	GD	Pts	Qualification
1	Kuwait	0	0	0	0	0	0	0	0	0	Promotion to 2022 Division III B
2	Kyrgyzstan (H)	0	0	0	0	0	0	0	0	0	
3	Malaysia	0	0	0	0	0	0	0	0	0	
4	Philippines	0	0	0	0	0	0	0	0	0	
5	Singapore	0	0	0	0	0	0	0	0	0	
6	Iran	0	0	0	0	0	0	0	0	0	

Rules for classification: 1) points; 2) head-to-head points; 3) head-to-head goal difference; 4) head-to-head number of goals scored; 5) result against closest best-ranked team outside tied teams; 6) result against second-best ranked team outside tied teams; 7) seeding before tournament.
(H) Host
