= 2023 IIHF World Championship Division IV =

Ice hockey tournament in Ulaanbaatar, Mongolia

Tournament details
- Host country: Mongolia
- Venue(s): 1 (in 1 host city)
- Dates: 23–26 March
- Teams: 4

Tournament statistics
- Games played: 6
- Goals scored: 61 (10.17 per game)
- Attendance: 11,063 (1,844 per game)
- Scoring leader(s): (Philippines) Manvil Billones (12 points)

Official website
- IIHF.com

The 2023 IIHF World Championship Division IV was an international ice hockey tournament run by the International Ice Hockey Federation.

The tournament was held in Ulaanbaatar, Mongolia from 23 to 26 March 2023 after the original hosts, Kuwait, withdrew from hosting the tournament.

Four nations participated in the tournament, including Mongolia, who returned to the World Championships after a ten-year absence. Indonesia and the Philippines made their debut in the World Championships. Originally, the Philippines had made its debut, but withdrew before last year's tournament began due to players, coaches and staffs being affected by the COVID-19 pandemic.

The Philippines won the tournament and were promoted to Division III B.

== Venues ==
2023 IIHF World Championship Division IV is located in Mongolia	Mongolia
2023 IIHF World Championship Division IV is located in Mongolia	Ulaanbaatar
2023 IIHF World Championship Division IV is located in Mongolia	Steppe Arena; Capacity: 3,600

== Participants ==
Team	Qualification
Kuwait	Placed 5th in Division IV last year.
Philippines	First time participating in tournament, withdrew last year.
Mongolia	Host, first participation since 2012.
Indonesia	First time participating in tournament.

== Match officials ==
Three referees and four linesmen were selected for the tournament.

Referees	Linesmen
(Austria) Manuel Nikolic; (Italy) Turo Virta; (Japan) Kenji Kosaka	(Czech Republic) Tomáš Brejcha; (Malaysia) Edmond Ng; (Singapore) Huang Qiwei; (Slovenia) Matjaž Hribar

== Standings ==
Pos	Team	Pld	W	OTW	OTL	L	GF	GA	GD	Pts	Promotion
1	Philippines	3	2	1	0	0	35	6	+29	8	Promoted to the 2024 Division III B
2	Mongolia (H)	3	2	0	1	0	19	8	+11	7	
3	Kuwait	3	1	0	0	2	4	24	−20	3	
4	Indonesia	3	0	0	0	3	3	23	−20	0	

Source: IIHF
Rules for classification: 1) points; 2) head-to-head points; 3) head-to-head goal difference; 4) head-to-head number of goals scored; 5) result against closest best-ranked team outside tied teams; 6) result against second-best ranked team outside tied teams; 7) seeding before tournament.
(H) Host

== Results ==
All times are local (UTC+8)

23 March 2023; 14:00	Philippines	14–0 (4–0, 6–0, 4–0)	Indonesia	Steppe Arena, Ulaanbaatar; Attendance: 700

Game reference

Paolo Spafford
Goalies
Satyaandipa Asmara
Izzan Rais
Referee:
(Italy) Turo Virta
Linesmen:
(Slovenia) Matjaž Hribar
(Singapore) Huang Qiwei

Sze (Montano) – 00:21	1–0
Billones (Sze, Tigaronita) – 04:29	2–0
Sze (Miller, Abis) – 14:03	3–0
Billones (Sze, Abis) – 15:00	4–0
Montano (Sze, Billones) – 20:42	5–0
Montano (Sze, Füglister) – 23:41	6–0
Füglister (Montano, Billones) – 25:33	7–0
Billones (Füglister) – 25:40	8–0
Sze (Montano, Füglister) (PP) – 29:41	9–0
Montano (Billones, Lancero) – 36:49	10–0
Abis – 42:45	11–0
Tigaronita (Crisostomo, Ham) (PP) – 57:38	12–0
Sibug (Relampagos, Miller) – 57:51	13–0
Lancero (Füglister, Regencia) – 58:53	14–0

2 min
Penalties
29 min
71
Shots
10

23 March 2023; 18:00	Kuwait	0–8 (0–4, 0–0, 0–4)	Mongolia	Steppe Arena, Ulaanbaatar; Attendance: 3,075

Game reference

Ahmad Al-Saegh
Goalies
Munkhbold Bayarsaikhan
Baatarhuu Bazarvaani
Referee:
(Austria) Manuel Nikolic
Linesmen:
(Czech Republic) Tomáš Brejcha
(Malaysia) Edmond Ng

0–1	05:52 – Jargalsaikhan (Zorigt, Namjil) (PP)
0–2	06:01 – Namjil (Erdenetogtokh)
0–3	16:04 – Mishigsuren (Erdenejav)
0–4	19:35 – Baatarkhuu (Bold, Bataar)
0–5	43:58 – Boldbaatar (Mishigsuren, Ganbold)
0–6	45:43 – Enh. Batbaatar (Bataar)
0–7	46:52 – Mishigsuren (Zorigt, Boldbaatar)
0–8	50:28 – Mishigsuren (Bold) (SH)

8 min
Penalties
8 min
20
Shots
57

25 March 2023; 14:00	Indonesia	2–4 (1–0, 1–1, 0–3)	Kuwait	Steppe Arena, Ulaanbaatar; Attendance: 375

Game reference

Satyaandipa Asmara
Goalies
Ahmad Al-Saegh
Referee:
(Japan) Kenji Kosaka
Linesmen:
(Czech Republic) Tomáš Brejcha
(Singapore) Huang Qiwei

Jordan (Novendra) – 17:56	1–0
Bagaskara (Chandra) – 30:32	2–0
	2–1	36:41 – Al-Zidan (Al-Khashram)
	2–2	41:33 – H. Al-Ajmi (Al-Maraghy) (PP)
	2–3	45:41 – Al-Sarraf (Al-Wadhi) (SH)
	2–4	58:08 – A. Al-Ajmi (Al-Sarraf, Al-Wadhi)

6 min
Penalties
10 min
24
Shots
46

25 March 2023; 18:00	Philippines	7–6 OT (3–0, 0–3, 3–3) (OT: 1–0)	Mongolia	Steppe Arena, Ulaanbaatar; Attendance: 3,267

Game reference

Gianpietro Iseppi
Goalies
Baatarhuu Bazarvaani
Munkhbold Bayarsaikhan
Referee:
(Italy) Turo Virta
Linesmen:
(Slovenia) Matjaž Hribar
(Malaysia) Edmond Ng

Sze (Montano) – 02:52	1–0
Regencia (Tigaronita, Crisostomo) – 10:55	2–0
Sze (Sibug, Billones) (PP) – 11:39	3–0
	3–1	25:23 – Mishigsuren (Ider, Baatarkhuu)
	3–2	30:06 – Erdenejav (Namjil)
	3–3	30:54 – Namjil (Ider, Bold)
Miller (Lancero) – 44:18	4–3
	4–4	47:08 – Ider (Namjil, Enkhtur) (PP)
Regencia (Lagleva, Füglister) (PP) – 48:43	5–4
Füglister (Tenedero, Sze) (PP) – 50:29	6–4
	6–5	51:40 – Enkhtur (Bold, Ider)
	6–6	52:43 – Davaanyam (Enk. Batbaatar, Zorigt)
Füglister (Billones, Tenedero) – 61:12	7–6

22 min
Penalties
14 min
30
Shots
49

26 March 2023; 14:00	Kuwait	0–14 (0–1, 0–4, 0–9)	Philippines	Steppe Arena, Ulaanbaatar; Attendance: 803

Game reference

Dhari Al-Omran
Ahmad Al-Saegh
Goalies
Paolo Spafford
Referee:
(Japan) Kenji Kosaka
Linesmen:
(Slovenia) Matjaž Hribar
(Malaysia) Edmond Ng

0–1	02:41 – Sze
0–2	22:36 – Montano (Regencia, Billones) (PP)
0–3	25:09 – Montano (Füglister) (PP)
0–4	39:04 – Miller (Abis)
0–5	39:50 – Crisostomo (Regencia)
0–6	42:27 – Billones (Relampagos)
0–7	43:56 – Füglister
0–8	44:41 – Regencia (Crisostomo)
0–9	45:37 – Billones (Relampagos)
0–10	50:41 – Montano (PP)
0–11	53:35 – Füglister (Sze)
0–12	54:11 – Lancero
0–13	55:07 – Tigaronita (Crisostomo)
0–14	56:06 – Relampagos (Billones, Tenedero)

16 min
Penalties
10 min
17
Shots
62

26 March 2023; 18:00	Mongolia	5–1 (3–0, 0–0, 2–1)	Indonesia	Steppe Arena, Ulaanbaatar; Attendance: 2,843

Game reference

Munkhbold Bayarsaikhan
Baatarhuu Bazarvaani
Goalies
Izzan Rais
Referee:
(Austria) Manuel Nikolic
Linesmen:
(Czech Republic) Tomáš Brejcha
(Singapore) Huang Qiwei

Ider (Bold, Bataar) (PP) – 03:24	1–0
Bold (Namjil, Ider) – 14:59	2–0
Enk. Batbaatar (Baatarkhuu, Enkhtur) – 15:18	3–0
	3–1	43:14 – Synarso (Salomo, Fadilla)
Lkhagvasuren (Erdenejav, Enkhtur) – 51:32	4–1
Lkhagvasuren – 52:00	5–1

10 min
Penalties
6 min
48
Shots
16

== Statistics ==
=== Scoring leaders ===
List shows the top skaters sorted by points, then goals.

Player	GP	G	A	Pts	+/−	PIM	POS
(Philippines) Manvil Billones	3	5	7	12	+13	8	F
(Philippines) Kenwrick Sze	3	6	5	11	+13	0	F
(Philippines) Steven Füglister	3	3	8	11	+13	0	F
(Philippines) Carl Montano	3	6	4	10	+10	6	F
(Philippines) Jan Regencia	3	3	3	6	+3	0	F
(Mongolia) Gerelt Ider	3	2	4	6	+5	6	F
(Mongolia) Mishigsuren Namjil	3	2	4	6	+6	0	F
(Mongolia) Erdenesukh Bold	3	1	5	6	+6	2	F
(Mongolia) Chinzolboo Mishigsuren	3	4	1	5	+3	4	F
(Philippines) Jorell Crisostomo	3	1	4	5	+2	2	F

GP = Games played; G = Goals; A = Assists; Pts = Points; +/− = P Plus–minus; PIM = Penalties In Minutes
Source: IIHF.com

=== Goaltending leaders ===
Only the top five goaltenders, based on save percentage, who have played at least 40% of their team's minutes, are included in this list.

Player	TOI	GA	GAA	SA	Sv%	SO
(Philippines) Paolo Spafford	120:00	0	0.00	27	100.00	2
(Mongolia) Munkhbold Bayarsaikhan	122:26	4	1.96	44	90.91	0
(Indonesia) Satyaandipa Asmara	94:07	11	7.01	88	87.50	0
(Kuwait) Ahmad Al-Saegh	125:37	14	6.69	90	84.44	0
(Indonesia) Izzan Rais	85:37	12	8.41	77	84.42	0

TOI = Time On Ice (minutes:seconds); GA = Goals against; GAA = Goals against average; Sv% = Save percentage; SO = Shutouts
Source: IIHF.com

== Awards ==
Position	Player
Goaltender	(Mongolia) Baatarhuu Bazarvaani
Defenceman	(Philippines) Eishner Sibug
Forward	(Kuwait) Ali Al-Sarraf
