= 2020 Men's Ice Hockey World Championships =

2020 edition of the Men's World Ice Hockey Championships

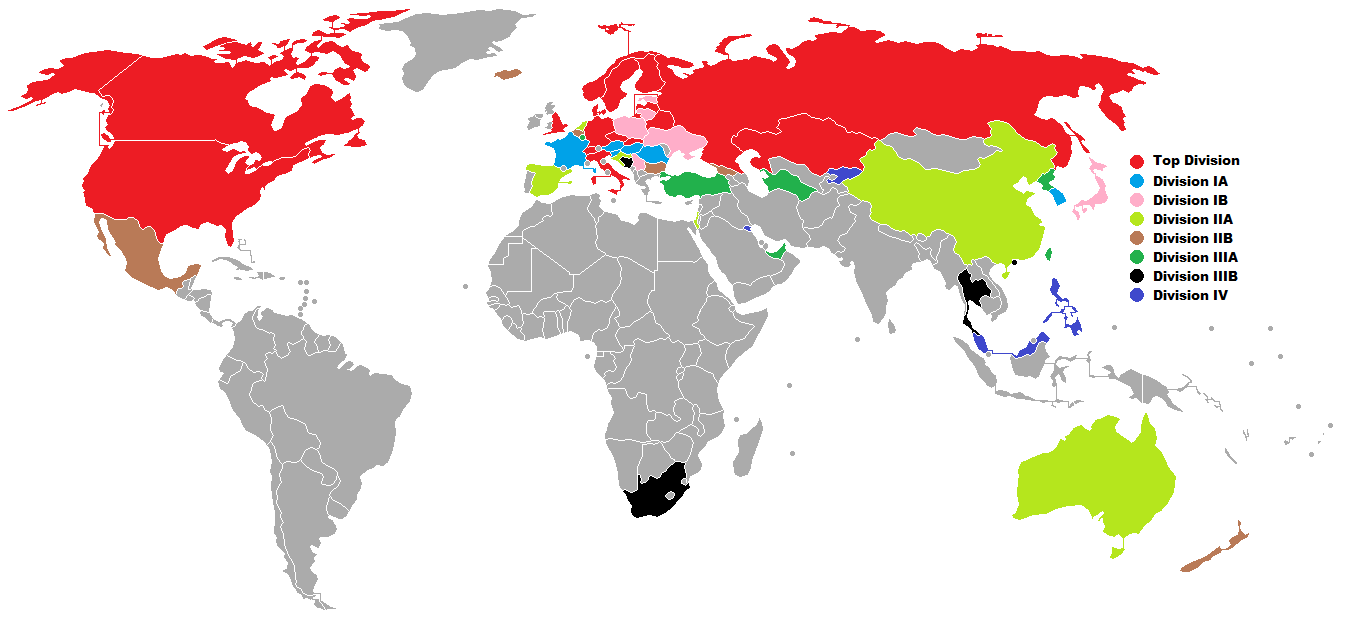
Map of the countries participating at the 2020 IIHF World Championships

The 2020 Men's Ice Hockey World Championships would have been the 84th such event hosted by the International Ice Hockey Federation. Teams would have participated in several levels of competition, including the inaugural competition in the newly created Division IV. The competition would also have served as qualifications for division placements in the 2021 competition.

Restructuring by the IIHF led to several changes in the lower divisions of the 2020 World Championships. Division III was renamed Division III-A, the Division III qualification tournament was renamed Division III-B, and Division IV was created, with the latter two tournaments consisting of four teams each instead of the standard six. The bottom two teams in the 2019 Division III qualification tournament were assigned to the new Division IV, along with newcomers Malaysia and the Philippines.

All tournaments were cancelled due to the COVID-19 pandemic.

== Championship (Top Division) ==
The tournament was scheduled to be held in Zürich and Lausanne, Switzerland from 8 to 24 May 2020. The tournament was cancelled on 21 March 2020 due to the COVID-19 pandemic.

- Belarus – Promoted from Division I-A
- Canada
- Czech Republic
- Denmark
- Finland
- Germany
- Great Britain
- Italy
- Kazakhstan – Promoted from Division I-A
- Latvia
- Norway
- Russia
- Slovakia
- Sweden
- Switzerland – Host
- United States

== Division I ==
=== Group A ===
The tournament was scheduled to be held in Ljubljana, Slovenia from 27 April to 3 May 2020. The tournament was cancelled on 17 March due to the COVID-19 pandemic.

- Austria – Relegated from Top Division
- France – Relegated from Top Division
- Hungary
- Romania – Promoted from Division I-B
- Slovenia
- South Korea

=== Group B ===
The tournament was scheduled to be held in Katowice, Poland from 27 April to 3 May 2020. The tournament was cancelled on 17 March due to the COVID-19 pandemic.

- Estonia
- Japan
- Lithuania – Relegated from Division I-A
- Poland
- Serbia – Promoted from Division II-A
- Ukraine

== Division II ==
=== Group A ===
The tournament would have been held in Zagreb, Croatia from 19 to 25 April 2020. On 13 March 2020, the tournament was cancelled due to the COVID-19 pandemic.

- Australia
- China
- Croatia
- Israel – Promoted from Division II B
- Netherlands – Relegated from Division I B
- Spain

=== Group B ===
The tournament would have been held in Reykjavík, Iceland from 19 to 25 April 2020. On 13 March 2020, the tournament was cancelled due to the COVID-19 pandemic.

- Belgium – Relegated from Division II A
- Bulgaria – Promoted from Division III
- Georgia
- Iceland
- Mexico
- New Zealand

== Division III ==
=== Group A ===
The tournament would have been held in Kockelscheuer, Luxembourg from 19 to 25 April 2020. On 13 March 2020, the tournament was cancelled due to the COVID-19 pandemic.

- Chinese Taipei
- Luxembourg
- North Korea – Relegated from Division II B
- Turkey
- Turkmenistan
- United Arab Emirates – Promoted from Division III B

=== Group B ===
The tournament would have been held in Cape Town, South Africa from 20 to 23 April 2020. On 13 March 2020, the tournament was cancelled due to the COVID-19 pandemic.

- Bosnia and Herzegovina
- Hong Kong
- South Africa – Relegated from Division III
- Thailand

== Division IV ==
The tournament would have been held in Bishkek, Kyrgyzstan from 3 to 5 March 2020. On 2 March 2020, the tournament was cancelled due to the COVID-19 pandemic.

- Kuwait
- Kyrgyzstan
- Malaysia
- Philippines
