= Indonesia men's national ice hockey team =

Indonesia
- Garuda Pancasila is the badge used on the players jerseys.
- Association: Indonesia Ice Hockey Federation
- General manager: Doddy Darmawan
- Head coach: Evgenii Nurislamov
- Assistants: Artem Bezurkov; Hsiao Po-yun
- Captain: Ronald Wijaya
- Most games: Anryan Saputra; Ronald Wijaya (38)
- Top scorer: Ronald Wijaya (18)
- Most points: Ronald Wijaya (32)
- Team colors
- IIHF code: INA
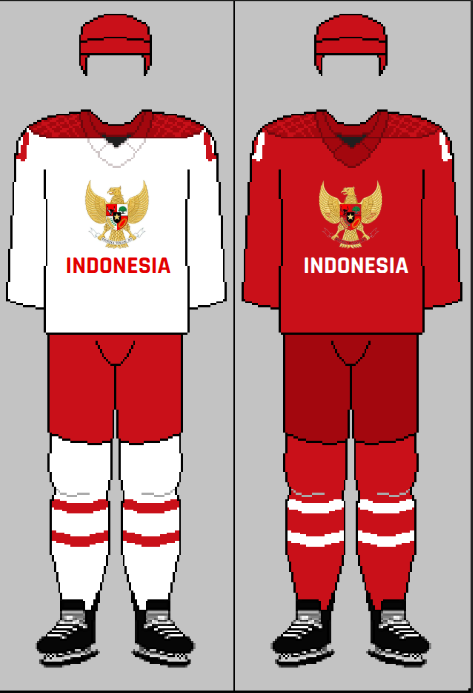

Ranking
- Current IIHF: 55 ▲1 (3 June 2026)
- Highest IIHF: 56 (since 2025)
- Lowest IIHF: 58 (since 2023)

First international
- Iran 10–3 Indonesia (Sapporo, Japan; 20 February 2017)

Biggest win
- Indonesia 10–4 Malaysia (Bangkok, Thailand; 14 December 2025)

Biggest defeat
- Uzbekistan 26–1 Indonesia (Yerevan, Armenia; 17 April 2025)

IIHF World Championships
- Appearances: 3 (first in 2023)
- Best result: 55th (2023, 2024)

Asian Winter Games
- Appearances: 1 (first in 2017)
- Best result: 18th (2017)

IIHF Challenge Cup of Asia
- Appearances: 2 (first in 2018)
- Best result: 5th (2019)

Southeast Asian Games
- Appearances: 3 (first in 2017)
- Best result: 1st (2025)

International record (W–L–T)
- 14–25–0

Medal record

SEA Games
Gold medal – first place	2025 Thailand	Team

The Indonesian national ice hockey team (Indonesian: Tim nasional hoki es Indonesia) is the national men's ice hockey team of Indonesia and has been an associate member of the International Ice Hockey Federation (IIHF). Indonesia has not qualified to any Olympic Games, but played in three World Championships tournaments. The team is currently ranked 58th in the IIHF World Ranking and 20th in Asian Ranking.

== History ==
The national team's first ever ice hockey match was a 10–0 loss on 19 January 2017 to Jakarta Dragons at the Bintaro Jaya Xchange Ice Skating Rink in Bintaro, Tangerang. Many of the Indonesian national team's players that partook in the match came from the Batavia Demons, a team that won the 2016 City Cup international ice hockey tournament (B Division invitational with some import players from Taiwan) which occurred in Singapore.

Indonesia debuted in the international tournament at the 2017 Asian Winter Games in Sapporo, Japan. Their first tournament match was supposed to be against Iran, but their opposition was disqualified due to eligibility issues. Iran still played their scheduled match against Indonesia on 17 February 2017, resulting a 10–3 win for the former. However, the game was considered as an exhibition game and its results had no bearing in the standings of the tournament.

== Tournament record ==
=== World Championship ===
Year	Host	Result	Pld	W	OTW	OTL	L
2023	(Mongolia) Ulaanbaatar	55th place (4th in Division IV)	3	0	0	0	3
2024	Kuwait City	55th place (3rd in Division IV)	3	0	1	0	2
2025	(Armenia) Yerevan	56th place (4th in Division IV)	5	2	0	0	3
2026	Kuwait City	Cancelled due to the 2026 Iran War					
Total		3 appearances	11	2	1	0	8

=== Asian Winter Games ===
Year	Host	Result	Pld	W	OTW	OTL	L
1986 through 2011		did not enter					
2017	(Japan) Sapporo	18th place (8th in Division II)	3	0	0	0	3
Total		1 appearance	3	0	0	0	3

=== Challenge Cup of Asia ===
Year	Host	Result	Pld	W	OTW	OTL	L
2008 through 2017		did not participate					
2018	(Malaysia) Kuala Lumpur	8th place (3rd in Division I)	5	2	0	0	3
2019	(Malaysia) Kuala Lumpur	5th place	5	3	0	0	2
2020	Singapore	cancelled					
Total		3/13	10	5	0	0	5

=== Southeast Asian Games ===
Year	Host	Result	Pld	W	OTW	OTL	L
2017	(Malaysia) Kuala Lumpur	5th place	4	0	0	0	4
2019	(Philippines) Pasay	5th place	4	0	0	0	4
2025	(Thailand) Bangkok	Champions	6	5	1	0	0
Total		3/3	14	5	1	0	8

== All-time record against other nations ==
Last match update: 19 December 2025

Key
Positive balance (more Wins)
Neutral balance (Wins = Losses)
Negative balance (more Losses)

Team	GP	W	T	L	GF	GA
Armenia	1	0	0	1	1	14
India	2	2	0	0	8	3
Iran	2	1	0	1	5	11
Kuwait	3	0	0	3	15	27
Macau	4	1	0	3	13	18
Malaysia	8	3	0	5	37	66
Mongolia	2	0	0	2	4	14
Oman	2	2	0	0	9	7
Philippines	4	1	0	3	6	35
Singapore	5	2	0	3	21	25
Thailand	4	2	0	2	6	30
Turkmenistan	1	0	0	1	2	12
Uzbekistan	1	0	0	1	1	26
Total	39	14	0	25	128	286

== Current roster ==
The following is the Indonesia roster in the 2024 IIHF World Championship Division IV.

No.	Position	Shoot/Catches	Name	Date of birth	Height	Weight	2022–23 Club
2	D	R	Joachim Lorenzo	5 July 2008	182 cm (6 ft 0 in)	54 kg (119 lb)	(Indonesia) Tibi Soccer School
16	GK	L	Doddy Darmawan	4 December 1982	178 cm (5 ft 10 in)	107 kg (236 lb)	—N/a
18	FW	R	Abraham Novendra	18 November 1999	172 cm (5 ft 8 in)	60 kg (130 lb)	BadaX Indonesia
21	GK	L	Izzan Rais	21 February 2004	168 cm (5 ft 6 in)	58 kg (128 lb)	(Indonesia) Wild Panther
24	D	R	Ronald Chandra	24 August 1982	174 cm (5 ft 9 in)	81 kg (179 lb)	(Indonesia) Batavia Demon
27	D	R	Akira Rizqi Prijanto	27 August 2002	180 cm (5 ft 11 in)	88 kg (194 lb)	(Indonesia) Batavia Demon
37	FW	R	Kenneth Dero Siregar	20 September 2007	176 cm (5 ft 9 in)	72 kg (159 lb)	(Canada) Everest Academy
48	FW	R	Raihan Jofino Hafiz	24 May 2006	174 cm (5 ft 9 in)	65 kg (143 lb)	BadaX Indonesia
51	FW	R	Haykal Kaykobad	5 January 2006	178 cm (5 ft 10 in)	70 kg (150 lb)	BadaX Indonesia
56	FW	R	Aditia Sutanto	4 February 1985	165 cm (5 ft 5 in)	66 kg (146 lb)	(Indonesia) Wild Panther
56	FW	R	Jonathan Ryan Nugraha	6 March 2002	171 cm (5 ft 7 in)	72 kg (159 lb)	BadaX Indonesia
69	D	R	Muchammad Alqaeda	28 December 2001	173 cm (5 ft 8 in)	96 kg (212 lb)	(Indonesia) Wild Panther
72	FW	R	Daffa Abyan Bagaskara	2 July 2007	172 cm (5 ft 8 in)	63 kg (139 lb)	BadaX Indonesia
74	FW	R	Keionne Zea	18 July 2006	180 cm (5 ft 11 in)	51 kg (112 lb)	BadaX Indonesia
87	FW	R	Anryan Saputra	6 June 1987	172 cm (5 ft 8 in)	70 kg (150 lb)	(Indonesia) Batavia Demon
88	D	R	Felix Yussanto	12 July 1982	178 cm (5 ft 10 in)	68 kg (150 lb)	(Indonesia) Batavia Demon
89	FW	R	Ronald Wijaya	24 December 1989	169 cm (5 ft 7 in)	92 kg (203 lb)	(Indonesia) Batavia Demon
93	FW	R	Fadilla Daffa	16 January 2006	170 cm (5 ft 7 in)	58 kg (128 lb)	BadaX Indonesia
96	FW	R	Nathan Lucas Salomo	25 October 2007	166 cm (5 ft 5 in)	55 kg (121 lb)	BadaX Indonesia
97	FW	R	Jeremiah Ong Praptasuganda	23 October 2003	170 cm (5 ft 7 in)	70 kg (150 lb)	BadaX Indonesia

== Coaches ==
Position	Name	Date of birth
Team Leader	(Indonesia) Raymond Synarso	8 January 1969
Head coach	(Canada) Shawn Berg	30 March 1978
Assistant coach	(Chinese Taipei) Hsiao Po-Yun	1 October 1995
Equipment Manager	(Canada) Lee Becker	27 June 1997
Physiotheraphist	(Malaysia) Abraham Victor	19 May 1988
Team Staff	(Indonesia) Vicky Vickers	25 December 1990
