= Philippine Hockey League =

- Sport: Ice hockey
- Founded: 2018
- First season: 2018–19
- No. of teams: 4
- Country: Philippines
- Most recent champion: Manila Hawks

The Philippine Hockey League (PHL) is the national ice hockey league in the Philippines which operates under regulations of the International Ice Hockey Federation (IIHF). The inaugural season started in October 2018.

The Philippine Minor Hockey League serves as the developmental league of the PHL.

== Teams ==
The inaugural PHL season has featured four teams:

- Manila Bearcats
- Manila Chiefs
- Philippine Eagles
- Manila Lightning

== Champions ==
- 2018–19: Manila Lightnings
- 2024 Manila Hawks
