= 2020 IIHF World Championship Division IV =

Tournament details
- Host country: Kyrgyzstan
- Venue: 1 (in 1 host city)
- Dates: 3–5 March (cancelled)
- Teams: 4

Official website
- Website

The 2020 IIHF World Championship Division IV was an international ice hockey tournament run by the International Ice Hockey Federation.

The tournament would have been held in Bishkek, Kyrgyzstan from 3 to 5 March 2020.

On 2 March 2020, the tournament was cancelled due to the COVID-19 pandemic.

== Planned participants ==
Team	Qualification
Kuwait	Placed 5th in Division III Q last year.
Kyrgyzstan	Host, placed 6th in Division III Q last year.
Malaysia	Was supposed to be the first time participating in tournament.
Philippines	Was supposed to be the first time participating in tournament.

== Match officials ==
Three referees and four linesmen were selected for the tournament.

Referees	Linesmen
(China) Feng Lei; (Denmark) Vernon Hoffered; (Romania) Mihai Paul	(Austria) Kevin Kontschieder; (Kazakhstan) Timur Iskakov; (Lithuania) Aleksej Sascenkov; (Romania) Botond Rédai

== Standings ==
Pos	Team	Pld	W	OTW	OTL	L	GF	GA	GD	Pts	Qualification
1	Kuwait	0	0	0	0	0	0	0	0	0	Promotion to 2021 Division III B
2	Kyrgyzstan (H)	0	0	0	0	0	0	0	0	0	
3	Malaysia	0	0	0	0	0	0	0	0	0	
4	Philippines	0	0	0	0	0	0	0	0	0	

Source: N/A
Rules for classification: 1) points; 2) head-to-head points; 3) head-to-head goal difference; 4) head-to-head number of goals scored; 5) result against closest best-ranked team outside tied teams; 6) result against second-best ranked team outside tied teams; 7) seeding before tournament.
(H) Host

== Planned schedule ==
All times are local (UTC+6).

3 March 2020; 17:00	Malaysia	Cancelled	Kuwait	Gorodskoi Katok, Bishkek

3 March 2020; 20:00	Kyrgyzstan	Cancelled	Philippines	Gorodskoi Katok, Bishkek

4 March 2020; 17:00	Kuwait	Cancelled	Philippines	Gorodskoi Katok, Bishkek

4 March 2020; 20:00	Kyrgyzstan	Cancelled	Malaysia	Gorodskoi Katok, Bishkek

5 March 2020; 15:00	Philippines	Cancelled	Malaysia	Gorodskoi Katok, Bishkek

5 March 2020; 18:00	Kuwait	Cancelled	Kyrgyzstan	Gorodskoi Katok, Bishkek
