= Ice hockey at the 2019 SEA Games =

Ice hockey at the 2019 Southeast Asian Games

Tournament details
- Host country: Philippines
- Venue: 1 (in 1 host city)
- Dates: 1–8 December
- Teams: 5

Final positions
- Champions: Thailand (1st title)
- Runners-up: Singapore
- Third place: Philippines

Tournament statistics
- Games played: 14
- Goals scored: 172 (12.29 per game)
- Attendance: 3,185 (228 per game)
- Scoring leader: (Thailand) Ken Kindborn (28 points)

The ice hockey competition at the 2019 Southeast Asian Games in the Philippines was held at the SM Mall of Asia Skating Rink in Pasay, Metro Manila from 1 to 8 December 2019.

Like in the previous edition, only a men's competition was held. Malaysia has requested the Philippines to introduce a women's ice hockey event to the games. The hosts complied with Malaysia's request but a total of three nations only expressed their interest to participate in a women's tournament a team short in order for women's hockey to be a medal event.

== Participating nations ==
- Indonesia (20)
- Malaysia (17)
- Philippines (20)
- Singapore (20)
- Thailand (20)

== Competition schedule ==
The following is the competition schedule for the ice hockey competition

| G | Group stage | ½ | Semifinals | B | 3rd place play-off | F | Final |

| Sun 1 | Mon 2 | Tue 3 | Wed 4 | Thu 5 | Fri 6 | Sat 7 | Sun 8 | |
|---|---|---|---|---|---|---|---|---|
| G | G | G | G | G | G | ½ | B | F |

== Competition format ==
The tournament had a single round robin format for the group phase with the top four teams advanced to the semifinals. The winning teams of the two semifinals contested the gold medal while the losing teams played against each other to determine the bronze medalist team.

== Group stage ==
| Pos | Team | Pld | W | OTW | OTL | L | GF | GA | GD | Pts | Qualification |
|---|---|---|---|---|---|---|---|---|---|---|---|
| 1 | Thailand | 4 | 4 | 0 | 0 | 0 | 52 | 3 | +49 | 12 | Semifinals |
| 2 | Philippines (H) | 4 | 3 | 0 | 0 | 1 | 29 | 15 | +14 | 9 | Semifinals |
| 3 | Singapore | 4 | 2 | 0 | 0 | 2 | 27 | 22 | +5 | 6 | Semifinals |
| 4 | Malaysia | 4 | 1 | 0 | 0 | 3 | 9 | 49 | −40 | 3 | Semifinals |
| 5 | Indonesia | 4 | 0 | 0 | 0 | 4 | 7 | 35 | −28 | 0 | |

Source: IIHF
Rules for classification: 1) points; 2) head-to-head points; 3) head-to-head goal difference; 4) head-to-head number of goals scored; 5) result against closest best-ranked team outside tied teams; 6) result against second-best ranked team outside tied teams; 7) seeding before tournament.
(H) Host

All times are Philippine Standard Time (UTC+8)

| 1 December 2019; 15:00 | Indonesia | 0–14 (0–5, 0–5, 0–4) | Thailand | SM Mall of Asia Ice Skating Rink; Attendance: 280 |

Game reference

Sangga Putra
Susanto
Goalies
Pattarapol Ungkulpattanasuk
Prawes Kaewjeen
Referees:
(New Zealand) Ryan Cairns
(South Korea) Park Jae-hyung
Linesmen:
(China) Fu Dahe
(New Zealand) Edward Howard

| 0–1 | 04:36 – Kindborn (Thanakroekkiat) (PP) |
| 0–2 | 08:54 – Khuhakaew (Tengsakul) |
| 0–3 | 09:31 – Forstner (Suwachirat, Kindborn) |
| 0–4 | 18:55 – Forstner (Chartsuwan) (SH) |
| 0–5 | 19:48 – Rattanachot (Chartsuwan) (SH) |
| 0–6 | 23:36 – Thanakroekkiat (Kitayama, Forstner) |
| 0–7 | 25:04 – Limpinphet (Kindborn) (SH2) |
| 0–8 | 28:01 – Suwachirat (Dhiranusornkit, Kindborn) (SH) |
| 0–9 | 28:50 – Chanchie. Supadilokluk (Chartsuwan) (SH) |
| 0–10 | 34:40 – Nagayama (Kitayama, Kindborn) (SH) |
| 0–11 | 50:58 – Jaradwuttipreeda (Chanchit Supadilokluk) |
| 0–12 | 52:10 – Kindborn (Kitayama) |
| 0–13 | 54:01 – Rattanachot (Khuhakaew) |
| 0–14 | 59:28 – Thanakroekkiat (Kindborn) (PP) |

37 min
Penalties
10 min
4
Shots
73

| 1 December 2019; 19:00 | Malaysia | 1–15 (0–4, 1–6, 0–5) | Philippines | SM Mall of Asia Ice Skating Rink; Attendance: 312 |

Game reference

Tengku Azlly
Adam Raja Amin
Goalies
Paolo Spafford
Referees:
(Sweden) Pär Daniel Eriksson
(South Korea) Lee Joo-hyun
Linesmen:
(Czech Republic) Daniel Hynek
(China) Li Lintai

| | 0–1 | 07:30 – Montano (Füglister) |
| | 0–2 | 08:36 – Lancero (Bengzon) |
| | 0–3 | 14:35 – Füglister (Regencia) |
| | 0–4 | 17:43 – Montano (Füglister) (SH) |
| | 0–5 | 20:12 – Füglister (Regencia) |
| B. Lim – 24:09 | 1–5 |
| | 1–6 | 25:55 – Imperial (Pastrana) |
| | 1–7 | 28:32 – Sibug (Regencia) (SH) |
| | 1–8 | 30:19 – So Tiong (Lancero, Bengzon) |
| | 1–9 | 31:02 – Yu (Relampagos, Tigaronita) |
| | 1–10 | 32:48 – Sibug (Füglister, Montano) (PP) |
| | 1–11 | 47:17 – Tenedero |
| | 1–12 | 47:30 – Füglister (Montano, Sibug) |
| | 1–13 | 56:07 – Lancero (Sibug, Bengzon) |
| | 1–14 | 58:24 – Imperial |
| | 1–15 | 58:31 – Sibug (Stern) |

6 min
Penalties
6 min
8
Shots
51

| 2 December 2019; 19:00 | Singapore | 8–2 (3–1, 3–0, 2–1) | Indonesia | SM Mall of Asia Ice Skating Rink; Attendance: 218 |

Game reference

Marcus Tang
Goalies
Sangga Putra
Referees:
(Hong Kong) Li Ho Ching
(South Korea) Park Jae-hyung
Linesmen:
(Kazakhstan) Timur Morev
(South Korea) Park Jun-soo

| E. Redden (Kodrowski) (PP) – 01:47 | 1–0 |
| | 1–1 | 03:13 – Hendrata (Wijaya) |
| Ng (Chua, Wong) (PP) – 17:14 | 2–1 |
| Ng (D. Goh, Wong) – 17:28 | 3–1 |
| Chew – 21:25 | 4–1 |
| E. Redden (Ng) – 24:26 | 5–1 |
| E. Redden (Kodrowski, Chew) (PP) – 35:47 | 6–1 |
| | 6–2 | 50:31 – Yussanto (A. Putra, Alqaeda) (PP) |
| E. Redden (PP) – 58:56 | 7–2 |
| Lam (Chew) – 59:17 | 8–2 |

20 min
Penalties
28 min
39
Shots
13

| 3 December 2019; 15:00 | Thailand | 16–0 (5–0, 5–0, 6–0) | Malaysia | SM Mall of Asia Ice Skating Rink; Attendance: 158 |

Game reference

Pattarapol Ungkulpattanasuk
Prawes Kaewjeen
Goalies
Adam Raja Amin
Referees:
(Sweden) Pär Daniel Eriksson
(Hong Kong) Li Ho Ching
Linesmen:
(China) Fu Dahe
(China) Li Lintai

| Forstner (Suwachirat, Kindborn) – 02:45 | 1–0 |
| Forstner (Nagayama) – 04:23 | 2–0 |
| Chartsuwan (Limpinphet, Chanchie. Supadilokluk) – 06:06 | 3–0 |
| Kindborn – 10:52 | 4–0 |
| Kitayama (Nagayama) – 17:32 | 5–0 |
| Forstner (Suwachirat) – 24:11 | 6–0 |
| Khuhakaew (Dhiranusornkit, Kitayama) – 25:45 | 7–0 |
| Vattanapanyakul (Chanchit Supadilokluk) – 27:00 | 8–0 |
| Kindborn (Forstner, Suwachirat) – 34:53 | 9–0 |
| Kitayama (SH) – 36:23 | 10–0 |
| Kindborn (Nagayama) – 44:07 | 11–0 |
| Kindborn (Limpinphet) – 48:38 | 12–0 |
| Limpinphet (Chanchie. Supadilokluk) – 49:19 | 13–0 |
| Suwachirat (Dhiranusornkit) – 51:23 | 14–0 |
| Forstner (Nagayama) – 52:13 | 15–0 |
| Kindborn – 57:45 | 16–0 |

8 min
Penalties
0 min
87
Shots
2

| 3 December 2019; 19:00 | Philippines | 5–3 (0–1, 1–0, 4–2) | Singapore | SM Mall of Asia Ice Skating Rink; Attendance: 278 |

Game reference

Gianpietro Iseppi
Goalies
Kenny Liang
Referees:
(New Zealand) Ryan Cairns
(South Korea) Lee Joo-hyun
Linesmen:
(Czech Republic) Daniel Hynek
(Kazakhstan) Timur Morev

| | 0–1 | 19:59 – Kodrowski (Wong) (PP) |
| Füglister (Montano) – 26:26 | 1–1 |
| Füglister (Montano) (PP) – 53:00 | 2–1 |
| | 2–2 | 53:18 – Kodrowski (Chew) |
| Bengzon (Lancero) – 54:05 | 3–2 |
| | 3–3 | 57:23 – E. Redden (Kodrowski) (PP) |
| Regencia (Füglister) – 59:50 | 4–3 |
| Regencia (Montano) (ENG) – 59:58 | 5–3 |

16 min
Penalties
14 min
25
Shots
23

| 4 December 2019; 19:00 | Indonesia | 1–8 (0–2, 1–0, 0–6) | Philippines | SM Mall of Asia Ice Skating Rink; Attendance: 235 |

Game reference

Sangga Putra
Susanto
Goalies
Paolo Spafford
Referees:
(Sweden) Pär Daniel Eriksson
(Hong Kong) Li Ho Ching
Linesmen:
(New Zealand) Edward Howard
(South Korea) Park Jun-soo

| | 0–1 | 00:59 – Tenedero |
| | 0–2 | 06:02 – Stern (Imperial) |
| Nugraha (Prijanto) – 32:44 | 1–2 |
| | 1–3 | 40:58 – Regencia (Füglister) |
| | 1–4 | 43:43 – Füglister (Montano) (PP) |
| | 1–5 | 52:03 – Füglister (Regencia, Montano) |
| | 1–6 | 53:45 – Tenedero (PP) |
| | 1–7 | 57:52 – Relampagos (Samson, Yu) |
| | 1–8 | 59:58 – Bengzon (Lancero, Cadiz) |

14 min
Penalties
4 min
12
Shots
53

| 5 December 2019; 15:00 | Malaysia | 5–4 (0–0, 4–1, 1–3) | Indonesia | SM Mall of Asia Ice Skating Rink; Attendance: 156 |

Game reference

Adam Raja Amin
Goalies
Sangga Putra
Referees:
(New Zealand) Ryan Cairns
(South Korea) Park Jae-hyung
Linesmen:
(China) Li Lintai
(Kazakhstan) Timur Morev

| B. Lim – 24:39 | 1–0 |
| | 1–1 | 29:12 – Wijaya |
| B. Lim (Sundram) (PP) – 31:35 | 2–1 |
| Tan – 31:35 | 3–1 |
| B. Lim – 47:28 | 4–1 |
| | 4–2 | 48:33 – Wijaya (Yussanto, Novendra) |
| | 4–3 | 50:41 – Novendra |
| | 4–4 | 51:35 – Praptasuganda (Synarso) |
| B. Lim (SH) – 55:50 | 5–4 |

12 min
Penalties
30 min
48
Shots
22

| 5 December 2019; 19:00 | Thailand | 12–2 (4–2, 3–0, 5–0) | Singapore | SM Mall of Asia Ice Skating Rink; Attendance: 193 |

Game reference

Pattarapol Ungkulpattanasuk
Goalies
Kenny Liang
Marcus Tang
Referees:
(Sweden) Pär Daniel Eriksson
(South Korea) Lee Joo-hyun
Linesmen:
(China) Fu Dahe
(New Zealand) Edward Howard

| | 0–1 | 03:33 – Kodrowski (Tan) |
| Thanakroekkiat – 05:00 | 1–1 |
| Suwachirat (Khuhakaew) – 08:24 | 2–1 |
| | 2–2 | 12:53 – Kodrowski (Tan) |
| Nagayama (Kindborn, Thanakroekkiat) (PP) – 17:46 | 3–2 |
| Khuhakaew – 19:35 | 4–2 |
| Suwachirat (Kindborn) (PP) – 23:31 | 5–2 |
| Kitayama (Kindborn) – 31:05 | 6–2 |
| Kitayama (Nagayama, Kindborn) – 31:15 | 7–2 |
| Forstner – 41:24 | 8–2 |
| Tengsakul (Luckanatinakorn, Suwachirat) (PP) – 45:13 | 9–2 |
| Kindborn (Kitayama, Khuhakaew) (PP) – 47:18 | 10–2 |
| Forstner (Kindborn) – 49:02 | 11–2 |
| Kitayama (Tengsakul) – 55:52 | 12–2 |

20 min
Penalties
14 min
52
Shots
12

| 6 December 2019; 15:00 | Singapore | 14–3 (5–0, 5–1, 4–2) | Malaysia | SM Mall of Asia Ice Skating Rink; Attendance: 138 |

Game reference

Kenny Liang
Marcus Tang
Goalies
Muhammad Asyraaf Haikal
Referees:
(South Korea) Lee Joo-hyun
(Hong Kong) Li Ho Ching
Linesmen:
(China) Fu Dahe
(New Zealand) Edward Howard

| Kodrowski (Chua) – 04:09 | 1–0 |
| E. Redden – 04:39 | 2–0 |
| Lee (Chew) – 06:21 | 3–0 |
| Chen (Tan) – 11:03 | 4–0 |
| Kodrowski – 11:21 | 5–0 |
| Ng (E. Redden) – 21:00 | 6–0 |
| C. Redden (Ng, E. Redden) – 22:10 | 7–0 |
| Kodrowski (Chew) (SH) – 25:09 | 8–0 |
| | 8–1 | 25:48 – Yow (Anjam) (PP) |
| Chew (Kodrowski) (PP) – 27:25 | 9–1 |
| Liu (Kok, Lam) – 27:54 | 10–1 |
| Lee (R. Goh, Ang) – 46:47 | 11–1 |
| | 11–2 | 50:36 – Anjam (Goh) |
| | 11–3 | 52:20 – Yow (Anjam) (PP) |
| Lam (Liu) – 53:44 | 12–3 |
| Ng (Ang, Chew) (PP) – 55:48 | 13–3 |
| R. Goh (Chew, Wong) – 58:41 | 14–3 |

6 min
Penalties
6 min
58
Shots
10

| 6 December 2019; 19:00 | Philippines | 1–10 (0–3, 1–4, 0–3) | Thailand | SM Mall of Asia Ice Skating Rink; Attendance: 298 |

Game reference

Paolo Spafford
Gianpietro Iseppi
Goalies
Pattarapol Ungkulpattanasuk
Referees:
(New Zealand) Ryan Cairns
(South Korea) Park Jae-hyung
Linesmen:
(Kazakhstan) Timur Morev
(South Korea) Park Jun-soo

| | 0–1 | 04:15 – Thanakroekkiat (Forstner, Nagayama) (PP) |
| | 0–2 | 05:00 – Limpinphet (Chanchie. Supadilokluk, Chartsuwan) |
| | 0–3 | 06:02 – Suwachirat (Chanchit Supadilokluk) |
| Tenedero (Montano) (PP) – 26:41 | 1–3 |
| | 1–4 | 30:41 – Khuhakaew (Kitayama) |
| | 1–5 | 30:55 – Forstner (Tengsakul, Luckanatinakorn) |
| | 1–6 | 31:12 – Forstner |
| | 1–7 | 35:19 – Suwachirat |
| | 1–8 | 46:59 – Kitayama (Kindborn) (PP) |
| | 1–9 | 49:26 – Khuhakaew (Nagayama) |
| | 1–10 | 53:59 – Forstner (SH) |

26 min
Penalties
36 min
16
Shots
39

== Knockout stage ==
=== Bracket ===
Semifinals
7 December
Thailand | 15
Malaysia | 0
7 December
Philippines | 3
Singapore | 4

Gold medal game
8 December
Thailand | 8
Singapore | 0
Bronze medal game
8 December
Philippines | 17
Malaysia | 1

=== Semifinals ===
| 7 December 2019; 15:00 | Thailand | 15–0 (6–0, 6–0, 3–0) | Malaysia | SM Mall of Asia Ice Skating Rink; Attendance: 115 |

Game reference

Prawes Kaewjeen
Goalies
Muhammad Asyraaf Haikal
Adam Raja Amin
Referees:
(New Zealand) Ryan Cairns
(South Korea) Lee Joo-hyun
Linesmen:
(New Zealand) Edward Howard
(China) Li Lintai

| Limpinphet (Rattanachot) – 08:21 | 1–0 |
| Luckanatinakorn (Suwachirat) – 09:24 | 2–0 |
| Limpinphet (Chartsuwan, Rattanachot) – 10:22 | 3–0 |
| Khuhakaew (Kitayama) – 11:11 | 4–0 |
| Khuhakaew – 14:25 | 5–0 |
| Nagayama (Kindborn, Kitayama) – 15:26 | 6–0 |
| Kulrat (Kindborn, Kitayama) (PP) – 25:14 | 7–0 |
| Thanakroekkiat (Kitayama, Nagayama) – 28:15 | 8–0 |
| Vattanapanyakul (Luckanatinakorn) – 28:48 | 9–0 |
| Nagayama (Kulrat) – 30:58 | 10–0 |
| Nagayama (Kindborn) – 36:50 | 11–0 |
| Chartsuwan (Chanchit Supadilokluk) – 39:39 | 12–0 |
| Khuhakaew (Tengsakul) – 43:35 | 13–0 |
| Suwachirat (Luckanatinakorn) – 45:50 | 14–0 |
| Jaradwuttipreeda – 57:20 | 15–0 |

0 min
Penalties
2 min
85
Shots
1

| 7 December 2019; 19:00 | Philippines | 3–4 (2–0, 0–2, 1–2) | Singapore | SM Mall of Asia Ice Skating Rink; Attendance: 283 |

Game reference

Gianpietro Iseppi
Goalies
Kenny Liang
Referees:
(Sweden) Pär Daniel Eriksson
(South Korea) Park Jae-hyung
Linesmen:
(China) Fu Dahe
(South Korea) Park Jun-soo

| Füglister (So Tiong) – 10:10 | 1–0 |
| Gautier (Füglister, Regencia) – 15:44 | 2–0 |
| | 2–1 | 22:14 – Lee (Tan, Kodrowski) |
| | 2–2 | 27:22 – Kodrowski |
| | 2–3 | 48:13 – Wong (Kodrowski) |
| Sibug (Lancero) (EA) – 59:00 | 3–3 |
| | 3–4 | 59:39 – Kodrowski (Lee, O'Brien) |

18 min
Penalties
4 min
24
Shots
27

=== Bronze medal game ===
| 8 December 2019; 15:00 | Philippines | 17–1 (4–0, 7–0, 6–1) | Malaysia | SM Mall of Asia Ice Skating Rink; Attendance: 278 |

Game reference

Gianpietro Iseppi
Goalies
Adam Raja Amin
Muhammad Asyraaf Haikal
Referees:
(Sweden) Pär Daniel Eriksson
(South Korea) Park Jae-hyung
Linesmen:
(China) Fu Dahe
(Kazakhstan) Timur Morev

| So Tiong (Bengzon, Tenedero) – 13:53 | 1–0 |
| Lancero (SH) – 15:07 | 2–0 |
| Regencia (Füglister, Tenedero) – 17:02 | 3–0 |
| Füglister (Montano, Syquiatco) – 17:50 | 4–0 |
| Füglister (Sibug, Regencia) – 20:25 | 5–0 |
| Montano (Tenedero, Füglister) – 20:59 | 6–0 |
| Füglister (So Tiong, Bengzon) – 23:46 | 7–0 |
| Stern (Montano, Tigaronita) – 26:05 | 8–0 |
| Füglister (Samson) – 27:55 | 9–0 |
| Lancero – 36:47 | 10–0 |
| Stern (Imperial) – 39:28 | 11–0 |
| Imperial (Relampagos) – 41:21 | 12–0 |
| Stern – 46:28 | 13–0 |
| So Tiong – 47:17 | 14–0 |
| Regencia (Montano, Füglister) – 49:03 | 15–0 |
| Bengzon (Lancero) – 51:03 | 16–0 |
| Stern (Relampagos) – 57:24 | 17–0 |
| | 17–1 | 59:44 – Rajakumar (Yow) |

8 min
Penalties
2 min
65
Shots
14

=== Gold medal game ===
| 8 December 2019; 19:00 | Thailand | 8–0 (3–0, 2–0, 3–0) | Singapore | SM Mall of Asia Ice Skating Rink; Attendance: 243 |

Game reference

Pattarapol Ungkulpattanasuk
Goalies
Kenny Liang
Referees:
(New Zealand) Ryan Cairns
(Hong Kong) Li Ho Ching
Linesmen:
(Czech Republic) Daniel Hynek
(China) Li Lintai

| Thanakroekkiat (Kindborn, Nagayama) (PP) – 05:00 | 1–0 |
| Kindborn (Kitayama, Khuhakaew) – 19:09 | 2–0 |
| Chartsuwan (Limpinphet, Tengsakul) – 19:23 | 3–0 |
| Nagayama (Thanakroekkiat, Tengsakul) – 31:54 | 4–0 |
| Luckanatinakorn (Chanchit Supadilokluk, Kindborn) – 39:06 | 5–0 |
| Suwachirat (Kindborn, Thanakroekkiat) – 41:30 | 6–0 |
| Luckanatinakorn (Tengsakul) – 44:04 | 7–0 |
| Kindborn – 52:48 | 8–0 |

4 min
Penalties
12 min
55
Shots
6

== Medalists ==
| Event | Gold | Silver | Bronze |
|---|---|---|---|
| Men | Thailand; Tewin Chartsuwan; Purich Dhiranusornkit; Patrick Forstner; Krittapad Jaradwuttipreeda; Prawes Kaewjeen; Phandaj Khuhakaew; Ken Edvin Kinborn; Masato Kitayama; Chayutapon Kulrat; Chanokchon Limpinphet; Nathaphat Luckanatinakorn; Hideki Nagayama; Teerasak Rattanachot; Chanchieo Supadilokluk; Chanchit Supadilokluk; Phanuruj Suwachirat; Jantaphong Tengsakul; Papan Thanakroekkiat; Pattarapol Ungkulpattanasuk; Archavin Vattanapanyakul | Singapore; Eugene Ang; Chen Pei Huan; Chew Wee; Cael Chua; Darren Goh; Ryan Goh; Benjamin Huang; James Kodrowski; Kok Hung Wei; Joewe Lam; Bryan Lee; Kenny Liang; Liu Zhiyang; Ignatius Ng; Richard Lowell Obrien; Christian William Redden; Ethan Peter Redden; Ryan Tan; Marcus Tang; Christopher Wong | Philippines; Samuel James Bengzon; Javier Alfonso Gabriel Cadiz; John Steven Fuglister; Francisco Emmanuel Gautier; Benjamin Jorge Imperial; Gianpetro Iseppi; Lenard Rigel Lancero II; Carl Michael Montano; Danilo Pastrana Jr. Jan Aro Regencia; Miguel Alfonso Relampagos; Jon David Samson; Eishner Jigsmac Sibug; Geffrey So; Paolo Spafford; Kenneth Mitchell Stern; Patrick Russell Syquiatco; Carlo Martin Tenedero; Carlo Angelo Tigaronita; Richmond Yu |
