= Ice hockey at the 2017 SEA Games =

Ice hockey at the 2017 Southeast Asian Games

Tournament details
- Host country: Malaysia
- Venue: 1 (in 1 host city)
- Dates: 20–24 August 2017
- Teams: 5 nations (100 players)

Final positions
- Champions: Philippines (1st title)
- Runners-up: Thailand
- Third place: Malaysia

Tournament statistics
- Games played: 10
- Goals scored: 108 (10.8 per game)
- Attendance: 18,593 (1,859 per game)
- Scoring leader: (Philippines) Paul Sanchez (14 points)

The ice hockey competitions at the 2017 Southeast Asian Games in Kuala Lumpur was held at the Empire City Ice Arena in Selangor.

The 2017 games featured only men's tournament. It served as a qualifying event for the 2018 Winter Olympics

== Competition schedule ==
The following was the competition schedule for the ice hockey competitions:

RR	Round robin

Sun 20	Mon 21	Tue 22	Wed 23	Thu 24
RR	RR	RR	RR	RR

== Participation ==
=== Participating nations ===
- Indonesia
- Malaysia
- Philippines
- Singapore
- Thailand

== Competition format ==
The tournament will follow a single round robin format with the top team by the end of the tournament winning the gold medal.

== Squads ==
Indonesia (INA)	Malaysia (MAS)	Philippines (PHI)	Singapore (SGP)	Thailand (THA)
Susanto (G); Rinaldo Sutjipto (D); Felix Utama (F); Aditya Putra (F); Felix Cahyono (F); Stefanus Michael (F); Budi Jonathan Sudharta (F); Stephanus Sugianto (D); Adrianus Gunawan (D); Sangga Putra (G); David (F); Jimmy Susanto (F); Ronald Chandra (D); Adianto Hie (D); Andi Budiwarman (F); Muchammad Alqaeda (D); Arif Setiawan (D); Anryan Saputra (F); Felix Yussanto (F); Ronald Wijaya (F)	Lee Thien Ian (G); Yap Eu Jin (D); Rafel Mohammed Rhiza (D); Loke Ban Kin (F); Bryan Lim (F); Brandon Tan (F); Low Jun Ming (F); Aqfar Naeem Abulais (F); Syed Ayman Syed Omar (F); Tengku Azlly Tengku Abdillah (G); Mohammad Noor Hisham (D); Aiman Mohd Fadzul (F); Khoo Seng Chee (F); Adris Abd Razak (F); Mohd Hariz Mohd Oryza (F); Moi Jia Yung (D); Stephan Santhanasamy (F); Reezman Isa (D); Muhammad Azman (D); Muhammad Shahrudin (D)	Lenard Rigel Lancero II (F); Carl Montano (F); Patrick Syquiatco (D); Carlo Tenedero (F); Jose Inigo Cadiz (D); Javier Cadiz (D); Daniel Pastrana (F); Steven Fuglister (F); Francois Gautier (D); Paolo Spafford (G); Gianpietro Issepi (G); Julius Santiago (D); Joshua Carino (D); Paul Sanchez (F); Miguel Serrano (F); Jan Regencia (F); Georgino Orda (D); Hector Navasero (D); Jorell Crisostomo (F); Benjamin Imperial (F)	Lok Da Xuan (F); Peter Tan (F); Reeve Chew (F); Loh Chee Seng (D); Darren Goh (F); Lam Kin Yu (F); James Kodrowski (F); Shene Eugene Chin (G); Liu Zhiyang (F); Richard O'Brien (F); Kenny Liang (G); Gabriel Lau (F); Ryan Tan (F); Johan Venema (F); Chen Pei Huan (D); Chew Wee (D); Chiong Woon Lip (F); Ang Yu Jin (F); Benjamin Huang (F); George Tan (F)	Rakchai Sukwiboon (F); Tewin Chartsuwan (F); Arthit Thamwongsin (F); Panithi Nawasmittawong (F); Teerasak Rattanachot (F); Prakpoom Thongaram (F); Prawes Kaewjeen (G); Anun Kullugin (D); Chanchit Supadilokluk (D); Jantaphong Tengsakul (F); Chayutapon Kulrat (D); Chanokchon Limpinphet (F); Pattarapol Ungkulpattanasuk (G); Papan Thanakroekkiat (D); Chanchieo Supadilokluk (F); Masato Kitayama (F); Voravith Maklamthong (D); Hideki Nagayama (F); Phandaj Khuhakaew (F)
Head Coach: (Malaysia) Tan Khia Peng	Head Coach: (Hungary) Kristof Kovago	Head Coach: (Czech Republic) Daniel Brodan	Head Coach: (Canada) Robert Martini	Head Coach: (Finland) Juhani Ijaes

Legend

- G– Goalie D = Defense F = Forward

== Results ==
All times are Malaysia Standard Time (UTC+8)

=== Round robin ===
Pos	Team	Pld	W	OTW	OTL	L	GF	GA	GD	Pts	Final Result
1	Philippines	4	3	1	0	0	32	13	+19	11	Gold medal
2	Thailand	4	3	0	0	1	33	9	+24	9	Silver medal
3	Malaysia (H)	4	2	0	1	1	29	23	+6	7	Bronze medal
4	Singapore	4	1	0	0	3	10	23	−13	3	
5	Indonesia	4	0	0	0	4	4	40	−36	0	

Updated to match(es) played on 23 August 2017. Source: Results (IIHF)
(H) Host

20 August 2017; 16:00	Indonesia	3–10 (2–4, 0–4, 1–2)	Malaysia	Empire City Mall; Attendance: 3,014

Game reference

Sangga Munggaran Putra
Goalies
Lee Thien Ian
Referees:
Park Jae Hyung (South Korea)
Yin An-Chung (Chinese Taipei)
Linesmen:
Chang Kai-Hsiang (Chinese Taipei)
Aomsin Ubolluck (Thailand)

Wijaya – 1:06	1–0
	1–1	3:37 – Khoo
	1–2	5:17 – B. Tan
	1–3	13:00 – Mohd Oryza (Noor Hisham)
Yussanto (Wijaya) – 18:07	2–3
	2–4	19:11 – Mohd Oryza (Loke)
	2–5	21:28 – Mohd Oryza (Moi)
	2–6	24:06 – B. Tan (Mohd Oryza, Noor Hisham)
	2–7	24:53 – Moi
	2–8	29:06 – Khoo (Yap)
Utama (Hie) – 48:17	3–8
	3–9	54:55 – Noor Hisham (Lim, Loke)
	3–10	56:35 – Mohd Fadzul (Mohd Oryza)

18 min
Penalties
24 min
14
Shots
65

20 August 2017; 20:00	Thailand	7–0 (3–0, 0–0, 4–0)	Singapore	Empire City Mall; Attendance: 1,033

Game reference

Prawes Kaewjeen
Goalies
Eugene Chin
Referees:
Lim Yong Chun (Malaysia)
Shen Yen-Chin (Chinese Taipei)
Linesmen:
Liu Tian Ge (China)
Mohd Faris Yusoff (Malaysia)

Thamwongsin (Khuhakaew) – 1:02	1–0
Chartsuwan (Kullugin) – 12:54	2–0
Khuhakaew (Kitayama) – 13:17	3–0
Kitayama (Khuhakaew) – 51:29	4–0
Khuhakaew – 52:32	5–0
Rattanachot (Chartsuwan) – 57:29	6–0
Supadilokluk (Sukwiboon) – 58:11	7–0

4 min
Penalties
8 min
46
Shots
18

21 August 2017; 16:00	Indonesia	0–12 (0–1, 0–6, 0–5)	Philippines	Empire City Mall; Attendance: 827

Game reference

Sangga Munggaran Putra
Goalies
Paolo Spafford
Referees:
Park Jae Hyung (South Korea)
Nikolas Sepponen (Finland)
Linesmen:
Mohd Noor Hisham (Malaysia)
Mohd Faris Yusoff (Malaysia)

0–1	5:57 – Sanchez (Tenedero)
0–2	23:11 – Füglister (Sanchez, Lancero)
0–3	26:03 – Lancero (Füglister, Jo. Cadiz)
0–4	26:30 – Gautier (Crisostomo)
0–5	30:29 – Füglister (Sanchez)
0–6	36:23 – Sanchez (Lancero, Füglister)
0–7	39:18 – Lancero (Sanchez, Santiago)
0–8	42:48 – Ja. Cadiz
0–9	48:17 – Füglister (Syquiatco, Jo. Cadiz)
0–10	50:52 – Santiago (Lancero, Pastrana)
0–11	51:07 – Sanchez (Füglister)
0–12	51:42 – Füglister (Sanchez)

18 min
Penalties
18 min
12
Shots
70

21 August 2017; 20:00	Malaysia	4–10 (2–3, 1–4, 1–3)	Thailand	Empire City Mall; Attendance: 2,778

Game reference

Tengku Azlly Tengku Abdillah
Goalies
Prawes Kaewjeen
Referees:
Shen Yen-Chin (Chinese Taipei)
Yin An-Chung (Chinese Taipei)
Linesmen:
Chang Kai-Hsiang (Chinese Taipei)
Liu Tian Ge (China)

Bryan Lim – 3:17	1–0
	1–1	8:22 – Khuhakaew (Kitayama)
Loke Ban Kin (Lim) – 13:16	2–1
	2–2	14:52 – Nagayama (Rattanachot, Tengsakul)
	2–3	19:08 – Nagayama (Thanakroekkiat, Rattanachot)
	2–4	20:40 Chartsuwan (Nagayama)
Bryan Lim – 23:51	3–4
	3–5	27:42 – Nagayama (Khuhakaew)
	3–6	37:28 – Khuhakaew (Thamwongsin, Thanakroekkiat)
	3–7	38:20 – Chartsuwan
	3–8	47:35 – Nagayama
	3–9	50:12 – Chartsuwan (Khuhakaew)
Loke Ban Kin (Lim, Syed Omar) – 50:20	4–9
	4–10	54:44 – Thamwongsin (Kitayama)

8 min
Penalties
10 min
19
Shots
51

22 August 2017; 16:00	Philippines	7–2 (1–0, 2–2, 4–0)	Singapore	Empire City Mall; Attendance: 617

Game reference

Iseppi Gianpietro
Goalies
Eugene Chin
Referees:
Nikolas Sepponen (Finland)
Yin An-Chung (Chinese Taipei)
Linesmen:
Aomsin Ubolluck (Thailand)
Mohd Faris Yusoff (Malaysia)

Füglister (Sanchez, Lancero) – 2:24	1–0
	1–1	25:34 – R. Tan (Venema)
Sanchez (Füglister) – 27:51	2–1
Füglister (Sanchez, Santiago) – 37:52	3–1
	3–2	38:59 – R. Tan (Chew W.)
Füglister – 40:27	4–2
Montano – 41:02	5–2
Pastana (Regencia) – 41:53	6–2
Montano (Tenedero, Crisostomo) – 45:26	7–2

18 min
Penalties
30 min
47
Shots
28

22 August 2017; 20:00	Thailand	12–0 (5–0, 5–0, 2–0)	Indonesia	Empire City Mall; Attendance: 503

Game reference

Pattarapol Ungkulpattanasuk
Goalies
Susanto
Referees:
Lim Yong Chun (Malaysia)
Shen Yen-Chin (Chinese Taipei)
Linesmen:
Chang Kai-Hsiang (Chinese Taipei)
Noor Hishad Mohammad Thaqeef (Malaysia)

0–1	3:39 – Chartsuwan (Kulrat, Nagayama)
0–2	4:00 – Kitayama (Limpinphet)
0–3	4:14 – Khuhakaew (Limpinphet)
0–4	9:36 – Thamwongsing (Maklamthong, Supadilokluk)
0–5	10:32 – Limpinphet
0–6	22:20 – Kitayama (Limpinphet, Khuhakaew)
0–7	25:23 Tengsakul
0–8	30:54 – Tengsakul (Thanakroekkiat)
0–9	33:43 – Khuhakaew
0–10	37:11 – Khukhakaew (Kitayama, Limpinphet)
0–11	54:25 – Nawasmittawong (Thanakroekkiat, Rattanachot)
0–12	57:36 – Nagayama (Thamwongsin, Chartsuwan)

6 min
Penalties
8 min
90
Shots
6

23 August 2017; 16:00	Singapore	6–1 (2–0, 1–1, 3–0)	Indonesia	Empire City Mall; Attendance: 449

Game reference

Sangga Munggaran Putra
Goalies
Eugene Chin
Referees:
Lim Yong Chun (Malaysia)
Nikolas Sepponen (Finland)
Linesmen:
Mohd Noor Hisham (Malaysia)
Mohd Faris Yussof

Chen (Chew W., R. Tan) – 5:09	1–0
G. Tan (Chiong, Goh) – 12:13	2–0
R. Chew (Chew W., R. Tan) – 32:49	3–0
	3–1	39:06 – Wijaya (Hie)
Lau (Lam) – 42:29	4–1
Kodrowski (R. Chew, Chiong) – 54:12	5–1
Chew W. (Chen, Kodrowski) – 54:55	6–1

20 min
Penalties
6 min
51
Shots
15

23 August 2017; 20:00	Malaysia	7–8 SO (1–3, 3–2, 3–2) (OT: 0–0)	Philippines	Empire City Mall; Attendance: 3,102

Game reference

Tengku Azlly Tengku Abdillah
Goalies
Paolo Spafford
Referees:
Park Jae-hyung (South Korea)
Shen Yen-Chin (Chinese Taipei)
Linesmen:
Liu Tian Ge (China)
Aomsin Ubullock (Thailand)

	0–1	3:24 – Montano (Crisostomo)
	0–2	7:11 – Montano
Mohd Orza (B. Tan) – 16:42	1–2
	1–3	16:42 – Lancero
	1–4	20:55 – Tenedero (Lancero, Syquiatco)
	1–5	26:21 – Crisostomo (Montano)
Lim – 30:03	2–5
Loke – 36:43	3–5
Mohd Oryza (B. Tan) – 37:27	4–5
Loke (Noor Hisham) – 40:27	5–5
Loke – 54:36	6–5
	6–6	56:22 – Sanchez (Tenedero)
	6–7	58:41 – Sanchez (Tenedero)
Lim (Loke) – 58:58	7–7

Mohd Oryza (miss)
Lim
Loke (miss)
Shootout
(miss) Lancero
Sanchez
Montano
4 min
Penalties
37 min
47
Shots
32

24 August 2017; 18:45 (Note: Initially scheduled at 16:00, the gold medal match between the Philippines and Thailand was delayed. The Philippines made a failed appeal to let its captain, Steven Füglister play in the match who incurred a suspension penalty in their previous match against Malaysia. The bronze medal match between Singapore and Malaysia was also delayed.)	Philippines	5–4 (3–0, 1–3, 1–1)	Thailand	Empire City Mall; Attendance: 2,246

Game reference

Iseppi Gianpietro
Goalies
Pattarapol Ungkulpattanasuk
Referees:
Lim Yong Chun (Malaysia)
Park Jae Hyung (South Korea)
Linesmen:
Chang Kai-Hsiang (Chinese Taipei)
Mohd Noor Hisham (Malaysia)

Imperial (Gautier) – 01:43	1–0
Sanchez – 11:06	2–0
Sanchez (Cadiz) – 13:54	3–0
Gautier (Imperial, Montano) – 25:02	4–0
	4–1	25:30 – Supadilokluk (Nagayama)
	4–2	34:30 – Thanakroekkiat (Kitayama)
	4–3	39:59 – Thanakroekkiat
Cadiz (Lancero) – 50:59	5–3
	5–4	56:31 – Kitayama (Rattanachot, Nagayama)

8 min
Penalties
14 min
26
Shots
44

24 August 2017; 22:00	Singapore	2–8 (2–2, 0–1, 0–5)	Malaysia	Empire City Mall; Attendance: 4,024

Game reference

Eugene Chin, Kenny Liang
Goalies
Tengku Azlly Tengku Abdillah
Referees:
Shen Yen-Chin (Chinese Taipei)
Yin An-Chung (Chinese Taipei)
Linesmen:
Liu Tian Ge (China)
Aomsin Ubolluck (Thailand)

Kodrowski (Chew W.) – 06:56	1–0
	1–1	17:47 – Mohd Oryza (Khoo)
	1–2	18:13 – Lim (Loke)
Kodrowski (Liu) – 19:59	2–2
	2–3	30:05 – Lim (Loke)
	2–4	42:05 – Khoo (B. Tan)
	2–5	46:50 – Lim (Loke, Mohd Fadzul)
	2–6	50:16 – Mohd Oryza (Lim)
	2–7	53:20 – Lim
	2–8	55:28 – Lim (Loke)

26 min
Penalties
18 min
43
Shots
38

== Statistics ==
=== Scoring leaders ===
#	Player	GP	G	A	Pts	+/–	PIM	POS
1	(Philippines) Paul Sanchez	4	8	6	14	+10	10	F
2	(Malaysia) Bryan Lim	4	9	4	13	+6	2	F
3	(Thailand) Phandaj Khuhakaew	4	7	5	12	+10	4	F
4	(Malaysia) Loke Ban Kin	4	5	7	12	+4	4	F
5	(Philippines) Steven Füglister	3	7	4	11	+6	39	F
6	(Malaysia) Mohd Hadr Mohd Oryza	4	7	2	9	+2	4	F
7	(Thailand) Nagayama Hideki	4	5	4	9	+9	2	F
8	(Thailand) Masato Kitayama	4	4	5	9	+9	2	F
9	(Philippines) Lenard Rigel Lancero II	4	3	6	9	+9	4	F/D
10	(Thailand) Tewin Chartsuwan	4	5	2	7	+10	4	F
10	(Philippines) Carl Michael Montano	4	5	2	7	+3	2	F

Source: IIHF.com

=== Goaltending leaders ===
Only the top five goaltenders, based on save percentage, who have played at least 40% of their team's minutes, are included in this list.

#	Player	TOI	GA	GAA	SA	SV%	SO
1	(Philippines) Gianpietro Issepi	119:51	6	3	72	91.67	0
2	(Thailand) Pattarapol Ungkulpattanasuk	105:30	2	1.14	21	90.48	1
3	(Philippines) Paolo Spafford	125:00	7	3.36	59	88.14	1
4	(Indonesia) Sangga Munggaran Putra	194:21	28	8.64	220	87.27	0
5	(Thailand) Prawes Kaewjeen	133:46	7	3.14	48	85.42	1

Source: IIHF.com

== Final standings ==
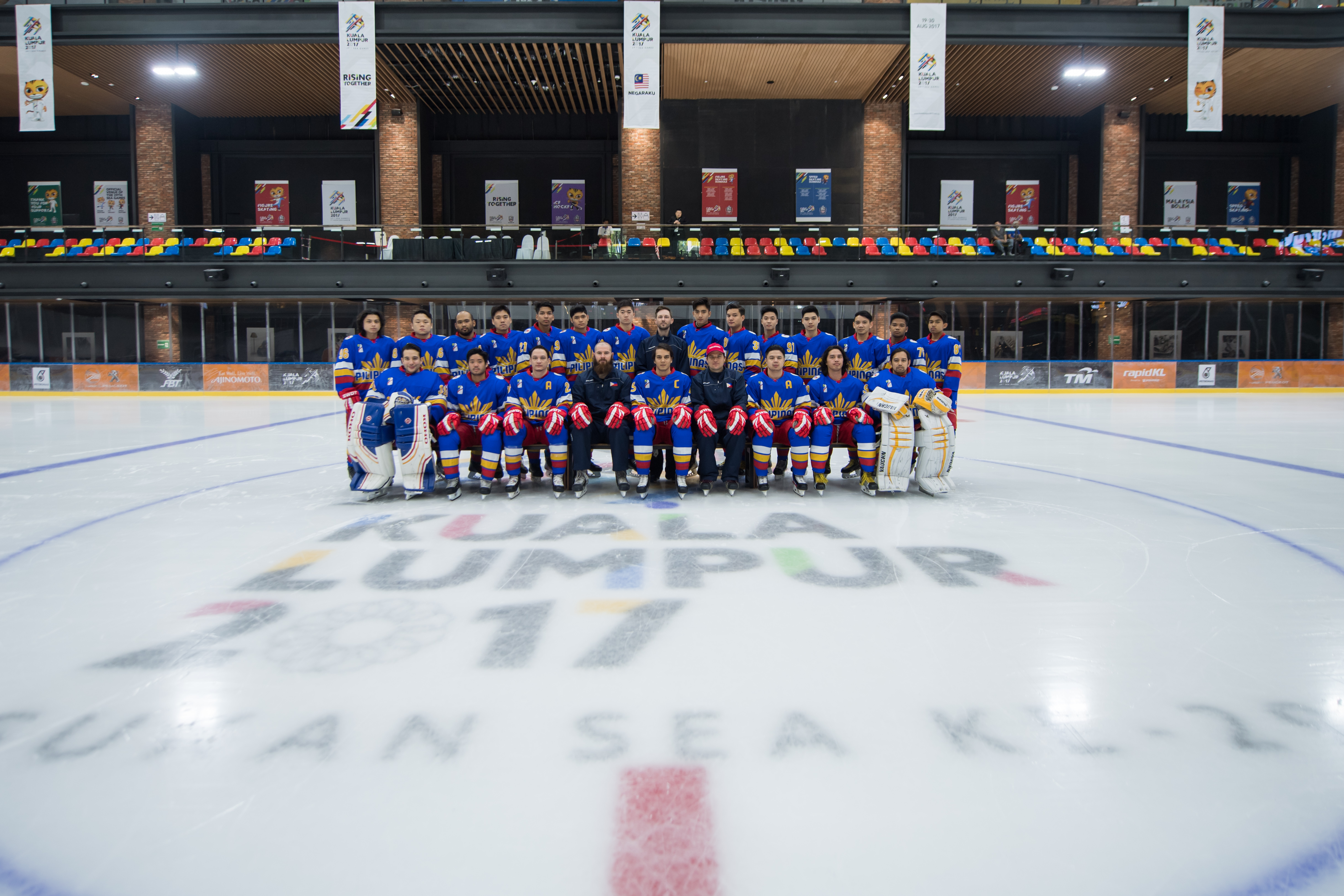
The Philippine national team won gold medal of the ice hockey event in this occasion.

Rank	Team	Pld	W	L
1st place, gold medalist(s)	Philippines	4	4	0
2nd place, silver medalist(s)	Thailand	4	3	1
3rd place, bronze medalist(s)	Malaysia	4	2	2
4	Singapore	4	1	3
5	Indonesia	4	0	4
