= Bahrain men's national ice hockey team =

Bahrain
- Head coach: Tamer Fakhroo
- Captain: Sameh Hegazi
- Most games: Three players (15)
- Top scorer: Nikita Shpakov (6)
- Most points: Nikita Shpakov (10)
- Team colors
- IIHF code: BHR

Ranking
- Current IIHF: NR (3 June 2026)

First international
- Spain 13–1 Bahrain (Dubai, United Arab Emirates; 30 December 1996)

Biggest win
- Bahrain 7–2 Tunisia (Kuwait City, Kuwait; 10 May 2023); Bahrain 9–4 Iran (Kazan, Russia; 12 May 2024)

Biggest defeat
- Kuwait 34–0 Bahrain (Harbin, China; 9 February 2025)

Asian Winter Games
- Appearances: 2 (first in 2011)
- Best result: 12th (2011)

Gulf Ice Hockey Championship
- Appearances: 1 (first in 2012)
- Best result: 4th (2012)

Arab Cup
- Appearances: 1 (first in 2023)
- Best result: 4th (2023)

International record (W–L–T)
- 4–27–0

The Bahrain national ice hockey team (Arabic: منتخب البحرين لهوكي الجليد) is the national men's ice hockey team of Bahrain.

== History ==
Bahrain played its first international game in a 2010 friendly game against Kuwait in which they lost, 10–3. The following year, Bahrain competed in the Premier Division of the 2011 Asian Winter Games. In the first two games, they were beaten by Malaysia (25–0) and by Thailand (29–0). They finished the tournament losing all six of their games and placing last on the table. In 2012, Bahrain competed at the 2012 Gulf Ice Hockey Championship. The team finished last after losing the bronze medal game against Oman.

After ten years of inactivity, Bahrain returned to competition at the 2022 GCC Games, where they lost all three games against the UAE, Saudi Arabia and Kuwait.

Bahrain had the longest losing streak of 18 games and had not won its first game until 7 May 2023, when they defeated Algeria 6–5 in overtime in their first game at the 2023 Arab Cup. Russian-born Bahraini forward Zakhar Zakharov, who played 49 games in the MHL with Sarmaty Orenburg, recorded his first hat-trick by scoring three goals, including the game-winning goal in overtime.

In September 2024, Bahrain was added as a full member by the IIHF. The team ranks 26th in the Asian men’s ice hockey ranking.

== Tournament record ==
=== Asian Winter Games ===
Year	Host	Result	Pld	W	OTW	OTL	L
2011	(Kazakhstan) Astana	12th place (7th in Premier Division)	6	0	0	0	6
2017	(Japan) Sapporo	withdrew					
2025	(China) Harbin	14th place	4	0	0	1	3
Total		2/3	10	0	0	1	9

=== GCC Gulf Championship/Arab Cup ===
Year	Host	Result	Pld	W	OTW	OTL	L
GCC Gulf Championship (2010–2016)
2010	Kuwait City	did not participate					
2012	(United Arab Emirates) Abu Dhabi	4th place	5	0	0	0	5
2014	Kuwait City	did not participate					
2016	(Qatar) Doha	did not participate					
GCC Games (2022)
2022	Kuwait City	4th place	3	0	0	0	3
Arab Cup (2023–)
2023	Kuwait City	4th place	5	1	1	0	3
Total		3/6	13	1	1	0	11

== All-time record against other national teams ==
Last match update: 14 February 2026

Team	GP	W	T	L	GF	GA
Algeria	1	1	0	0	6	5
Iran	2	2	0	0	16	8
Kuwait	7	0	0	7	12	101
Kyrgyzstan	2	0	0	2	10	44
Lebanon	1	0	0	1	1	8
Macau	1	0	0	1	3	4
Malaysia	1	0	0	1	0	25
Mongolia	1	0	0	1	1	21
Oman	6	0	0	6	12	33
Saudi Arabia	1	0	0	1	2	5
Singapore	1	0	0	1	1	20
Thailand	1	0	0	1	0	29
Tunisia	1	1	0	0	7	2
United Arab Emirates	4	0	0	4	2	60
Uzbekistan	1	0	0	1	0	17
Total	31	4	0	27	73	382
