= Qatar men's national ice hockey team =

Qatar
- Association: Qatar Winter Sports Committee
- Head coach: Marius Gliga
- Assistants: Nico Kivilahti; Jon Galang
- Team colors
- IIHF code: QAT

Ranking
- Current IIHF: NR (3 June 2026)

First international
- Oman 9–3 Qatar (Doha, Qatar; 28 February 2014)

Biggest win
- Qatar 7–2 Oman (Kuwait City, Kuwait; 12 June 2014)

Biggest defeat
- Philippines 14–2 Qatar (Sapporo, Japan; 23 February 2017)

Gulf Ice Hockey Championship
- Appearances: 2 (first in 2014)
- Best result: 2nd (2016)

IIHF Challenge Cup of Asia
- Appearances: 1 (first in 2016)
- Best result: 9th (2016)

Asian Winter Games
- Appearances: 1 (first in 2017)
- Best result: 17th (2017)

International record (W–L–T)
- 5–14–0

The Qatari national ice hockey team (Arabic: منتخب قطر لهوكي الجليد) is the national men's ice hockey team of Qatar. They are controlled by the Qatar Winter Sports Committee and has been a member of the International Ice Hockey Federation (IIHF) since 18 May 2012. Qatar is currently not ranked in the IIHF World Ranking and have not entered in any World Championship tournaments or at any Olympic Games, but have only played once in the Challenge Cup of Asia Division I tournament in 2016, a regional tournament for lower-tier hockey nations in Asia.

== History ==
The sport was mostly unknown in Qatar, until the establishment of the first edition of the Qatar Ice Hockey Championship, with the participation of four teams to include Qatari, Canadian and English Czech's and Finnish players organized by the Sports Affairs Department of the Qatar Olympic Committee. Qatar's national team participated at the 2017 Asian Winter Games in Sapporo, Japan. The country has two ice rinks (Gondolania Ice Arena and City Centre Mall) with a two division hockey league providing official competition. The six teams for 2009–10 were the RasGas, Sandvipers, Qatar Qanucks, European Fitness Club, Sundogs, and CNAQ Breakers.

On 18 May 2012, Qatar was added as an official members by the IIHF. Qatar played its first game against Oman, which they lost 2–1. In 2014, Qatar participated in the Gulf Ice Hockey Championship. They played five games, losing four and winning one, earning the bronze medal against Oman 7–2. In 2018, Qatar was scheduled to compete in the Challenge Cup of Asia Division I tournament in Kuala Lumpur, Malaysia, but cancelled.

Qatar currently sits 31st in the Asian men’s ice hockey national team rankings, according to the specialized outlet AsianIceHockey.com.

== Tournament record ==
=== GCC Gulf Championship ===
Year	Host	Result	Pld	W	OW	OL	L
2010 through 2012		Did not participate					
2014	Kuwait City	3rd place	5	1	0	0	4
2016	(Qatar) Doha	2nd place	5	2	0	0	3

=== Challenge Cup of Asia ===
Year	Host	Result	Pld	W	OW	OL	L
2008 through 2015		Did not participate					
2016	(Kyrgyzstan) Bishkek	9th place (4th in Division I)	4	1	0	0	3
2017 through 2018		Did not participate					

=== Asian Winter Games ===
Year	Host	Result	Pld	W	OW	OL	L
1986 through 2011		Did not participate					
2017	(Japan) Sapporo	17th place (7th in Division II)	3	0	0	0	3

== All-time record ==
As of 24 February 2017

Team	GP	W	T	L	GF	GA
India	1	1	0	0	5	2
Kuwait	4	1	0	3	16	26
Kyrgyzstan	2	0	0	2	2	16
Macau	3	1	0	2	4	7
Malaysia	1	0	0	1	1	3
Oman	3	2	0	1	15	14
Philippines	1	0	0	1	2	14
United Arab Emirates	4	0	0	4	3	28
Total	19	5	0	14	48	110
