= United Arab Emirates men's national ice hockey team =

Men's national ice hockey team representing the United Arab Emirates

United Arab Emirates
- Association: UAE Ice Sports Federation
- General manager: Juma Al-Dhaheri; Hamel Al-Qubaisi
- Head coach: David Rich
- Captain: Ali Al-Haddad
- Most games: Juma Al-Dhaheri (113)
- Top scorer: Juma Al-Dhaheri (108)
- Most points: Juma Al-Dhaheri (227)
- Home stadium: Abu Dhabi Ice Rink
- Team colors
- IIHF code: UAE
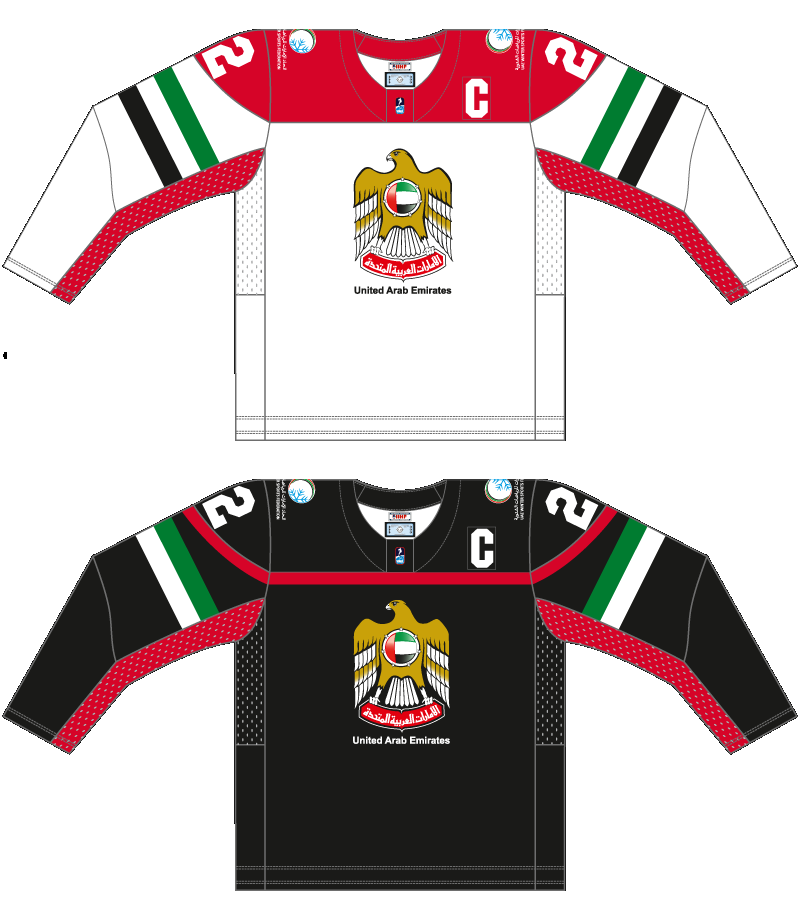

Ranking
- Current IIHF: 38 ▲1 (3 June 2026)
- Highest IIHF: 32 (2025)
- Lowest IIHF: 48 (2019)

First international
- United Arab Emirates 4–0 Thailand (Changchun, China; 26 January 2007)

Biggest win
- United Arab Emirates 25–0 Bahrain (Astana, Kazakhstan; 31 January 2011)

Biggest defeat
- Kazakhstan 38–0 United Arab Emirates (Changchun, China; 27 January 2007)

IIHF World Championships
- Appearances: 11 (first in 2010)
- Best result: 31st (2024, 2025)

Asian Winter Games
- Appearances: 3 (first in 2007)
- Best result: 6th (2007)

Arab Cup of Ice Hockey
- Appearances: 1 (first in 2008)
- Best result: 1st (2008)

IIHF Challenge Cup of Asia
- Appearances: 9 (first in 2009)
- Best result: 1st (2009, 2012, 2017)

Gulf Ice Hockey Championship
- Appearances: 4 (first in 2010)
- Best result: 1st (2010, 2012, 2014, 2016)

International record (W–L–T)
- 97–44–1

Medal record

Arab Cup
Gold medal – first place	2008 Abu Dhabi	

GCC Gulf Championship
Gold medal – first place	2010 Kuwait City	
Gold medal – first place	2012 Abu Dhabi	
Gold medal – first place	2014 Kuwait City	
Gold medal – first place	2016 Doha	

GCC Games
Gold medal – first place	2022 Kuwait City	

Challenge Cup of Asia
Gold medal – first place	2009 Abu Dhabi	
Gold medal – first place	2012 Dehradun	
Gold medal – first place	2017 Bangkok	
Silver medal – second place	2010 Taipei City	
Silver medal – second place	2011 Kuwait City	
Silver medal – second place	2014 Abu Dhabi	
Silver medal – second place	2015 Taipei City	
Silver medal – second place	2016 Abu Dhabi	

The United Arab Emirates national ice hockey team (Arabic: منتخب الإمارات العربية المتحدة لهوكي الجليد) is the national men's ice hockey team of the United Arab Emirates. It is operated under the UAE Ice Sports Federation and a member of the International Ice Hockey Federation (IIHF). The UAE currently competes in Division II Group A tournament of the World Championships. As of 2025, it is currently ranked 32nd in the IIHF World Ranking and 5th in the Asian Ranking.

== History ==
In June 2008, the UAE took part in the inaugural Arab Cup in Abu Dhabi, also involving the national teams of Algeria, Morocco, and Kuwait. They went on to finish first in the standings and won the gold medal after defeating Kuwait, 4–1. They won the gold in the 2009 IIHF Challenge Cup of Asia also in Abu Dhabi.

In 2010, the UAE became the first from an Arab nation to play in the IIHF World Championship when they participated in Division III. Although the UAE was not ranked in the world rankings until they played against Ireland, Luxembourg, and Greece, and finished last in Group A with a record of four losses. Their new head coach was Teemu Taruvuori of Finland. In May 2010, the UAE participated in the Kuwaiti organized GCC Gulf Championship, finishing first after winning all three of their games.

=== Withdrawal from 2011 and 2016 IIHF tournaments ===
The UAE decided to withdraw from the 2011 Division III tournament in Cape Town, South Africa because they refused to compete against Israel, who was also in the tournament. They also withdrew from the 2016 Division III tournament, with no reason cited.

== Tournament record ==
=== World Championships ===
Year	Host	Result	GP	W	OTW	OTL	L
1930 through 2009		did not enter					
2010	(Luxembourg) Kockelscheuer	46th place (4th in Division III A)	3	0	0	0	3
2011	(South Africa) Cape Town	Withdrew from tournament					
2012	(Turkey) Erzurum	did not participate					
2013	(South Africa) Cape Town	46th place (6th in Division III)	5	0	0	0	5
2014	(Luxembourg) Kockelscheuer	45th place (5th in Division III)	5	1	0	1	3
2015	(Turkey) İzmir	46th place (6th in Division III)	6	1	0	1	4
2016	(Turkey) Istanbul	Withdrew from tournament					
2017	(Bulgaria) Sofia	47th place (7th in Division III, Relegated)	4	0	0	0	4
2018	(Bosnia and Herzegovina) Sarajevo	49th place (3rd in Division III Q)	3	1	0	0	2
2019	(United Arab Emirates) Abu Dhabi	47th place (1st in Division III Q, Promoted)	5	4	0	0	1
2020 and 2021		Cancelled due to the COVID-19 pandemic					
2022	(Luxembourg) Kockelscheuer	37th place (1st in Division III A, Promoted)	4	4	0	0	0
2023	(Turkey) Istanbul	35th place (1st in Division II B, Promoted)	5	5	0	0	0
2024	(Serbia) Belgrade	31st place (3rd in Division II A)	5	3	0	0	2
2025	(Serbia) Belgrade	31st place (3rd in Division II A)	5	2	0	0	4
2026	(United Arab Emirates) Al Ain	Cancelled due to the 2026 Iran War					
Total		11/14	50	21	0	2	27

=== Asian Winter Games ===
Year	Host	Result	GP	W	OTW	OTL	L
1986 through 2003		did not enter					
2007	(China) Changchun	6th place	4	2	0	0	2
2011	(Kazakhstan) Astana	8th place (3rd in Premier Division)	6	4	0	0	2
2017	(Japan) Sapporo	7th place (3rd in Division I)	5	3	0	0	2
2025	(China) Harbin	Withdrew					
Total		3/4	15	9	0	0	6

=== Arab Cup/GCC Gulf Championship ===
Year	Host	Result	GP	W	OTW	OTL	L
Arab Cup (2008)
2008	(United Arab Emirates) Abu Dhabi	1st place	5	4	1	0	0
GCC Gulf Championship (2010–2016)
2010	Kuwait City	1st place	3	3	0	0	0
2012	(United Arab Emirates) Abu Dhabi	1st place	5	4	1	0	0
2014	Kuwait City	1st place	5	5	0	0	0
2016	(Qatar) Doha	1st place	5	5	0	0	0
GCC Games (2022)
2022	Kuwait City	1st place	3	3	0	0	0
Total		6/6	26	24	2	0	0

=== Challenge Cup of Asia ===
Year	Host	Result	GP	W	OTW	OTL	L
2008	Hong Kong	did not participate					
2009	(United Arab Emirates) Abu Dhabi	1st place	5	5	0	0	0
2010	(Chinese Taipei) Taipei City	2nd place	5	3	0	1	1
2011	Kuwait City	2nd place	5	4	0	0	1
2012	(India) Dehradun	1st place	5	5	0	0	0
2013	(Thailand) Bangkok	6th place	5	2	0	1	2
2014	(United Arab Emirates) Abu Dhabi	2nd place	5	3	1	0	1
2015	(Chinese Taipei) Taipei City	2nd place	4	3	0	0	1
2016	(United Arab Emirates) Abu Dhabi	2nd place	4	3	0	0	1
2017	(Thailand) Bangkok	1st place	4	3	1	0	0
2018	(Philippines) Pasay	did not participate					
2019	(Malaysia) Kuala Lumpur	did not participate					
2020	Singapore	did not participate					
Total		9/13	42	31	2	2	7

== All-time record against other nations ==
Last match update: 5 May 2025

Key
Positive balance (more Wins)
Neutral balance (Wins = Losses)
Negative balance (more Losses)

Team	GP	W	T	L	GF	GA
Algeria	2	2	0	0	16	6
Australia	2	2	0	0	8	5
Bahrain	4	4	0	0	60	2
Belgium	2	2	0	0	12	3
Bosnia and Herzegovina	5	4	0	1	27	14
Bulgaria	2	1	0	1	12	13
Chinese Taipei	10	3	0	7	39	39
Croatia	1	0	0	1	1	4
Georgia	4	2	0	2	19	26
Greece	3	1	0	2	6	11
Hong Kong	9	4	1	4	37	27
Iceland	1	1	0	0	7	2
India	1	1	0	0	10	0
Iran	1	1	0	0	9	6
Ireland	2	0	0	2	5	15
Israel	2	1	0	1	12	9
Kazakhstan	1	0	0	1	0	38
Kuwait	17	17	0	0	83	19
Kyrgyzstan	3	0	0	3	8	30
Luxembourg	7	2	0	5	19	48
Macau	3	3	0	0	22	0
Malaysia	6	6	0	0	46	7
Mexico	1	1	0	0	9	4
Mongolia	8	8	0	0	38	12
Morocco	1	1	0	0	9	0
Netherlands	1	0	0	1	0	5
New Zealand	1	1	0	0	7	1
North Korea	4	0	0	4	6	33
Oman	6	6	0	0	47	9
Qatar	4	4	0	0	28	3
Saudi Arabia	2	2	0	0	19	2
Serbia	2	0	0	2	3	9
Singapore	4	4	0	0	30	6
South Africa	2	0	0	2	0	23
Thailand	13	10	0	3	58	39
Turkey	3	2	0	1	21	19
Turkmenistan	2	1	0	1	10	8
Total	137	92	1	44	708	490

== See also ==
- Emirates Ice Hockey League
- Ice hockey in the United Arab Emirates
