= 2019 IIHF Challenge Cup of Asia =

Tournament details
- Host country: Malaysia
- City: Kuala Lumpur
- Venue(s): 1 (in 1 host city)
- Dates: 1–9 March 2019
- Teams: 7

Final positions
- Champions: Mongolia (2nd title)
- Runner-up: Philippines
- Third place: Singapore

Tournament statistics
- Games played: 18
- Goals scored: 174 (9.67 per game)
- Attendance: 3,639 (202 per game)
- Scoring leader(s): (Mongolia) Gerelt Ider (17 points)

Awards
- MVP: (Philippines) Steven Füglister

Official website
- IIHF.com

The 2019 IIHF Challenge Cup of Asia was the 12th edition of the IIHF Challenge Cup of Asia, an annual international ice hockey tournament held by the International Ice Hockey Federation (IIHF). The tournament took place from 1 to 9 March 2019 at Malaysia National Ice Skating Stadium in Kuala Lumpur, Malaysia.

Last year's runner-up Thailand will not participate for the first time since the competition kicked off in 2008 and made their debut in Division III qualification tournament of the 2019 World Championships. Kuwait also participates in Division III qualification tournament and India unable to participate in the tournament due to lack of money. Only Oman returned after one year absence, bringing the number of participants reduced from nine to seven teams. Mongolia won the Challenge Cup of Asia for the second straight year, by defeating the Philippines in the final, while Singapore defeating hosts Malaysia, to win their first ever bronze medal in the tournament.

== Participants ==
=== Group A ===
Team	2018 Results
Mongolia	Won gold medal last year.
Philippines	Won bronze medal last year.
Singapore	Finished 4th place last year.
Malaysia	Host, winner of Division I last year.

=== Group B ===
Team	2018 Results
Macau	Runner-up of Division I last year.
Indonesia	Finished 3rd place in Division I last year.
Oman	Did not participate last year. Last participation in 2017.

=== Match officials ===
4 referees and 6 linesmen were selected for the tournament.

Referees

- (Singapore) Yu Jin Ang
- (China) Chi Hongda
- (Sweden) Johan Magnusson
- (Malaysia) Mohamed Faris Hakimin Yusoff

Linesmen

- (Malaysia) Yong Elbert Cheah
- (Singapore) Chee Seng Loh
- (Malaysia) Edmond Ng
- (Philippines) Eishner Jigsmac Sibug
- (Macau) Tam Weng-leong
- (Indonesia) Heru Wardana

== Preliminary round ==
All times are in Malaysia Standard Time (UTC+8).

=== Group A ===
Pos	Team	Pld	W	OTW	OTL	L	GF	GA	GD	Pts	Qualification
1	Philippines	3	3	0	0	0	20	11	+9	9	Advanced to Semifinals
2	Mongolia	3	2	0	0	1	25	14	+11	6	Advanced to Semifinals
3	Malaysia (H)	3	1	0	0	2	15	18	−3	3	Advanced to Quarterfinals
4	Singapore	3	0	0	0	3	9	26	−17	0	Advanced to Quarterfinals

Source: IIHF.com
Rules for classification: 1) points; 2) head-to-head points; 3) head-to-head goal difference; 4) head-to-head number of goals scored; 5) result against closest best-ranked team outside tied teams; 6) result against second-best ranked team outside tied teams; 7) seeding before tournament.
(H) Host

1 March 2019; 20:30	Singapore	2–6 (1–0, 1–3, 0–3)	Malaysia	MyNISS, Kuala Lumpur; Attendance: 303

Game reference
14 min	Penalties	32 min
32	Shots	46

2 March 2019; 20:30	Philippines	7–4 (1–2, 4–1, 2–1)	Singapore	MyNISS, Kuala Lumpur; Attendance: 233

Game reference
18 min	Penalties	16 min
55	Shots	33

3 March 2019; 20:30	Malaysia	5–9 (1–2, 1–3, 3–4)	Mongolia	MyNISS, Kuala Lumpur; Attendance: 355

Game reference
12 min	Penalties	12 min
15	Shots	63

4 March 2019; 20:30	Mongolia	13–3 (2–1, 6–1, 5–1)	Singapore	MyNISS, Kuala Lumpur; Attendance: 127

Game reference
4 min	Penalties	8 min
53	Shots	20

5 March 2019; 20:30	Philippines	7–4 (2–2, 2–2, 3–0)	Malaysia	MyNISS, Kuala Lumpur; Attendance: 297

Game reference
24 min	Penalties	46 min
36	Shots	42

6 March 2019; 20:30	Mongolia	3–6 (2–4, 1–2, 0–0)	Philippines	MyNISS, Kuala Lumpur; Attendance: 161

Game reference
12 min	Penalties	16 min
55	Shots	33

=== Group B ===
Pos	Team	Pld	W	OTW	OTL	L	GF	GA	GD	Pts	Qualification
1	Indonesia	4	3	0	0	1	18	14	+4	9	Advanced to Quarterfinals
2	Macau	4	2	0	0	2	14	17	−3	6	Advanced to Quarterfinals
3	Oman	4	1	0	0	3	15	16	−1	3	Eliminated

Source: IIHF.com
Rules for classification: 1) points; 2) head-to-head points; 3) head-to-head goal difference; 4) head-to-head number of goals scored; 5) result against closest best-ranked team outside tied teams; 6) result against second-best ranked team outside tied teams; 7) seeding before tournament.

1 March 2019; 17:00	Indonesia	3–2 (0–0, 2–2, 1–0)	Oman	MyNISS, Kuala Lumpur; Attendance: 188

Game reference
12 min	Penalties	10 min
46	Shots	23

2 March 2019; 17:00	Macau	3–6 (1–2, 2–2, 0–2)	Indonesia	MyNISS, Kuala Lumpur; Attendance: 127

Game reference
10 min	Penalties	12 min
22	Shots	44

3 March 2019; 17:00	Oman	5–6 (1–3, 1–2, 3–1)	Indonesia	MyNISS, Kuala Lumpur; Attendance: 107

Game reference
39 min	Penalties	22 min
28	Shots	51

4 March 2019; 17:00	Macau	6–1 (1–0, 2–0, 3–1)	Oman	MyNISS, Kuala Lumpur; Attendance: 94

Game reference
4 min	Penalties	8 min
52	Shots	30

5 March 2019; 17:00	Indonesia	3–4 (2–3, 1–1, 0–0)	Macau	MyNISS, Kuala Lumpur; Attendance: 112

Game reference
14 min	Penalties	8 min
32	Shots	20

6 March 2019; 17:00	Oman	7–1 (1–0, 5–0, 1–1)	Macau	MyNISS, Kuala Lumpur; Attendance: 82

Game reference
10 min	Penalties	18 min
37	Shots	32

== Playoff round ==
=== Bracket ===
Quarterfinals
A4	Singapore	7
B1	Indonesia	4
A3	Malaysia	8
B2	Macau	1

Semifinals
A1	Philippines	6
A4	Singapore	1
A2	Mongolia	12
A3	Malaysia	6

Final
A1	Philippines	3
A2	Mongolia	6
Third place
A3	Malaysia	0
A4	Singapore	4

=== Quarterfinals ===
7 March 2019; 17:00	Singapore	7–4 (2–3, 3–1, 2–0)	Indonesia	MyNISS, Kuala Lumpur; Attendance: 109

Game reference
22 min	Penalties	14 min
38	Shots	20

7 March 2019; 20:30	Malaysia	8–1 (2–0, 4–0, 2–1)	Macau	MyNISS, Kuala Lumpur; Attendance: 211

Game reference
35 min	Penalties	20 min
38	Shots	21

=== Semifinals ===
8 March 2019; 17:00	Philippines	6–1 (3–0, 2–1, 1–0)	Singapore	MyNISS, Kuala Lumpur; Attendance: 136

Game reference
8 min	Penalties	12 min
37	Shots	28

8 March 2019; 20:30	Mongolia	12–6 (1–2, 6–2, 5–2)	Malaysia	MyNISS, Kuala Lumpur; Attendance: 335

Game reference
8 min	Penalties	22 min
76	Shots	29

=== Bronze medal game ===
9 March 2019; 17:00	Malaysia	0–4 (0–1, 0–1, 0–2)	Singapore	MyNISS, Kuala Lumpur; Attendance: 294

Game reference
20 min	Penalties	18 min
23	Shots	21

=== Final ===
9 March 2019; 20:30	Philippines	3–6 (0–3, 1–0, 2–3)	Mongolia	MyNISS, Kuala Lumpur; Attendance: 368

Game reference
24 min	Penalties	8 min
29	Shots	47

== Final ranking ==
2019 IIHF Challenge Cup of Asia

Mongolia
2nd title

Rank	Group	Team	Final result
1	A	Mongolia	Champions
2	A	Philippines	Runners-up
3	A	Singapore	Third place
4	A	Malaysia	Fourth place
5	B	Indonesia	Quarterfinals
6	B	Macau	Quarterfinals
7	B	Oman	Preliminary round

Source: IIHF.com

== Awards and statistics ==
=== Awards ===
- Best players selected by the directorate:
  - Best Goalkeeper: (Philippines) Paolo Spafford
  - Best Defenceman: (Mongolia) Batgerel Zorigt
  - Best Forward: (Malaysia) Wai Kin Tan

Source: IIHF.com

=== Scoring leaders ===
Player	GP	G	A	Pts	+/–	PIM	Pos
(Mongolia) Gerelt Ider	5	11	6	17	+11	4	F
(Malaysia) Wai Kin Tan	6	8	9	17	+2	8	F
(Philippines) Steven Füglister	5	7	8	15	+7	4	F
(Singapore) Bryan Lee	6	8	6	14	+4	12	F
(Philippines) Carl Montano	5	7	6	13	+6	4	F
(Malaysia) Chee Ming Lim	6	7	6	13	0	0	F
(Singapore) James Kodrowski	5	4	9	13	+7	6	F
(Indonesia) Ronald Wijaya	5	5	6	11	+4	2	F
(Mongolia) Erdenesükh Bold	5	5	5	10	+9	4	F
(Singapore) Jiaju Ryan Tan	6	7	2	9	+1	0	F

Source: IIHF.com

=== Goaltending leaders ===
Only the top five goaltenders, based on save percentage, who have played at least 40% of their team's minutes, are included in this list.

Player	TOI	GA	GAA	SA	SV%	SO
(Philippines) Paolo Spafford	200:00	11	3.30	125	91.20	0
(Oman) Mohamed Al-Balushi	239:54	16	4.00	181	91.16	0
(Singapore) Kenny Liang	259:04	21	4.86	159	86.79	1
(Malaysia) Shahrul Ilyas Shukor	243:46	22	5.42	161	86.34	0
(Macau) Leung Man-long	299:43	25	5.00	181	86.19	0

Source: IIHF.com
