= Kuwait men's national ice hockey team =

Men's national ice hockey team representing Kuwait

Kuwait
- The badge on players' jerseys is the emblem of Kuwait.
- Nickname: Falcons (الصقور)
- Association: Kuwait Ice Hockey Association
- General manager: Fuhaid Al-Ajmi
- Head coach: Andris Bartkevics
- Captain: Jasem Al Awadhi
- Most games: Ahmad Al-Ajmi (107)
- Top scorer: Ahmad Al-Ajmi (71)
- Most points: Ahmad Al-Ajmi (133)
- Home stadium: Kuwait Winter Games Club Ice Skating Rink
- Team colors
- IIHF code: KUW
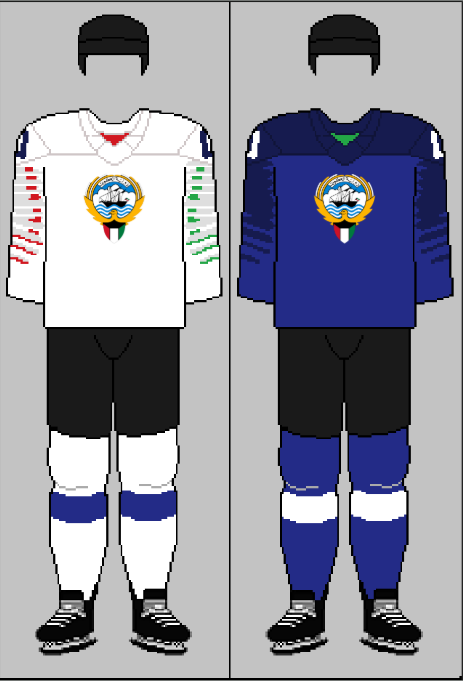

Ranking
- Current IIHF: 53 ▲1 (3 June 2026)
- Highest IIHF: 50 (2018–19, 2023)
- Lowest IIHF: 53 (2025)

First international
- Japan 44–1 Kuwait (Gangneung, South Korea; 30 January 1999)

Biggest win
- Kuwait 39–2 India (Kuwait City, Kuwait; 26 April 2011)

Biggest defeat
- Japan 44–1 Kuwait (Gangneung, South Korea; 30 January 1999)

IIHF World Championships
- Appearances: 6 (first in 2018)
- Best result: 49th (2022)

Asian Winter Games
- Appearances: 4 (first in 1999)
- Best result: 6th (1999)

Arab Cup
- Appearances: 2 (first in 2008)
- Best result: 2nd (2008, 2023)

IIHF Asia and Oceania Championship
- Appearances: 8 (first in 2010)
- Best result: 4th (2011, 2012, 2013)

GCC Gulf Championship
- Appearances: 4 (first in 2010)
- Best result: 2nd (2010, 2012, 2014)

International record (W–L–T)
- 53–67–1

Medal record

IIHF Asia and Oceania Championship
Gold medal – first place	2015 Kuwait City	Division I
Gold medal – first place	2017 Kuwait City	Division I

Arab Cup
Silver medal – second place	2008 Abu Dhabi	
Silver medal – second place	2023 Kuwait City	

GCC Gulf Championship
Silver medal – second place	2010 Kuwait City	
Silver medal – second place	2008 Abu Dhabi	
Silver medal – second place	2014 Kuwait City	
Bronze medal – third place	2016 Doha	

GCC Games
Bronze medal – third place	2022 Kuwait City	

The Kuwait national ice hockey team (Arabic: منتخب الكويت لهوكي الجليد) is the national men's ice hockey team of Kuwait. The team is controlled by the Kuwait Ice Hockey Association and a member of the International Ice Hockey Federation (IIHF) since 8 May 2009. Kuwait participated in the IIHF Challenge Cup of Asia, a regional tournament for lower-tier hockey nations in Asia, from 2010 to 2018. Kuwait made its World Championship debut at the 2018 Division III Qualification tournament.

As of December 2025, Kuwait is ranked 53rd in the IIHF World Ranking and 14th in the specialized ranking of Asian national teams.

== History ==
In 1985, Kuwait had joined the IIHF, but was expelled in 1992 due to a lack of ice hockey activity. In 1999, Kuwait played their first games at the 1999 Asian Winter Games against Japan, China, and Mongolia, losing all three. In 2007, Kuwait returned to international play at the 2007 Asian Winter Games where they recorded their first win against Macau. The following year they competed in the Arab Cup finishing second after losing to the United Arab Emirates in the final. In 2009, Kuwait re-admitted into the IIHF as an associate member. In 2010, Kuwait competed in their first Challenge Cup of Asia, finishing seventh overall, and in 2014, finishing 6th overall, losing all five games, and were relegated to Division I. Also, they participated in the Kuwaiti organized Gulf Championship, finishing second behind the United Arab Emirates.

== Tournament record ==
=== World Championships ===
Year	Host	Result	Pld	W	OTW	OTL	L
1930 through 1992		did not enter					
1993 through 2008		Expelled from IIHF					
2009 through 2017		did not enter					
2018	(Bosnia and Herzegovina) Sarajevo	50th place (4th in Division III Q)	3	0	0	0	3
2019	(United Arab Emirates) Abu Dhabi	51st place (5th in Division III Q)	5	1	0	0	4
2020 and 2021		Cancelled due to the COVID-19 pandemic					
2022	(Kyrgyzstan) Bishkek	49th place (5th in Division IV)	4	0	0	0	4
2023	(Mongolia) Ulaanbaatar	54th place (3rd in Division IV)	3	1	0	0	2
2024	Kuwait City	54th place (3rd in Division IV)	3	2	0	0	1
2025	(Armenia) Yerevan	55th place (3rd in Division IV)	5	3	1	0	1
2026	Kuwait City	Cancelled due to the 2026 Iran War					

=== Asian Winter Games ===
Year	Host	Result	Pld	W	OTW	OTL	L
1999	(South Korea) Gangneung	6th place	2	0	0	0	2
2003	(Japan) Aomori	did not participate					
2007	(China) Changchun	7th place	4	2	0	0	2
2011	(Kazakhstan) Astana	11th place (6th in Premier Division)	6	1	0	0	5
2011	(Kazakhstan) Astana	Competed as (International Olympic Committee) Athletes from Kuwait					
2017	(Japan) Sapporo	16th place (6th in Division II)	3	1	0	0	2
2017	(Japan) Sapporo	Competed as (International Olympic Committee) Independent Olympic Athletes					
2025	(China) Harbin	9th place	4	3	0	1	0

=== Arab Cup/GCC Gulf Championship ===
Year	Host	Result	Pld	W	OTW	OTL	L
Arab Cup (2008)
2008	(United Arab Emirates) Abu Dhabi	2nd place	5	3	0	1	1
GCC Gulf Championship (2010–2016)
2010	Kuwait City	2nd place	3	2	0	0	1
2012	(United Arab Emirates) Abu Dhabi	2nd place	5	3	0	1	1
2014	Kuwait City	2nd place	5	3	0	0	2
2016	(Qatar) Doha	3rd place	5	3	0	0	2
GCC Games (2022)
2022	Kuwait City	3rd place	3	1	0	0	2
Arab Cup (2023–)
2023	Kuwait City	2nd place	5	4	0	0	1

=== Asia and Oceania Championship ===
Year	Host	Result	Pld	W	OTW	OTL	L
2008 and 2009		did not participate					
2010	(Chinese Taipei) Taipei City	7th place	6	2	–	1*	3
2011	Kuwait City	4th place	5	2	0	0	3
2012	(India) Dehradun	4th place	6	2	0	0	4
2013	(Thailand) Bangkok	4th place	7	2	0	0	5
2014	(United Arab Emirates) Abu Dhabi	6th place	5	0	0	0	5
2015	Kuwait City	6th place (1st in Division I)	5	5	0	0	0
2016	(United Arab Emirates) Abu Dhabi	did not participate					
2017	Kuwait City	6th place (1st in Division I)	3	3	0	0	0
2018	(Philippines) Pasay	5th place	4	0	0	1	3

== All-time record against other national teams ==
Last match update: 17 April 2025

Team	GP	W	T	L	GF	GA
Algeria	2	2	0	0	14	4
Armenia	1	1	0	0	5	4
Bahrain	7	7	0	0	101	12
Bosnia and Herzegovina	2	0	0	2	1	17
China	2	0	0	2	1	46
Chinese Taipei	5	1	0	4	14	60
Hong Kong	4	0	0	4	3	36
India	4	4	0	0	70	11
Indonesia	3	3	0	0	27	15
Iran	2	1	0	1	13	9
Japan	1	0	0	1	1	44
Kyrgyzstan	6	2	0	4	26	36
Lebanon	1	0	0	1	4	9
Macau	5	4	1	0	35	7
Malaysia	10	6	0	4	71	44
Mongolia	8	0	0	8	12	50
Morocco	2	2	0	0	15	3
Oman	11	11	0	0	94	13
Philippines	3	0	0	3	3	35
Qatar	4	3	0	1	26	16
Saudi Arabia	2	1	0	1	15	10
Singapore	5	3	0	2	21	15
Thailand	10	0	0	10	17	81
Tunisia	1	1	0	0	11	4
Turkmenistan	2	1	0	1	10	28
United Arab Emirates	17	0	0	17	19	83
Uzbekistan	1	0	0	1	3	13
Total	120	52	1	67	599	706
