= Oman men's national ice hockey team =

Oman
- The national emblem of Oman is the badge used on the players jerseys.
- Nickname: The Khanjars
- Association: Oman Ice Sports Committee
- General manager: Qassim Al Bouri
- Head coach: Khalid Muhamad
- Assistants: Ebrahem Mohammady
- Most games: Ibrahim Al Ghabshi & Ahmad Al Qatami (13)
- Most points: Ibrahim Al Ghabshi (10)
- Home stadium: Al Khuwair Center Ice Rink
- Team colors
- IIHF code: OMA

Ranking
- Current IIHF: NR (3 June 2026)

First international
- United Arab Emirates 11–0 Oman (Kuwait City, Kuwait; 26 May 2010)

Biggest win
- Oman 9–3 Qatar (Kuwait City, Kuwait; 9 June 2014); Oman 7–1 Macau (Kuala Lumpur, Malaysia; 6 March 2019)

Biggest defeat
- Kuwait 17–1 Oman (Doha, Qatar; 28 January 2016)

Gulf Ice Hockey Championship
- Appearances: 4 (first in 2010)
- Best result: 3rd (2012)

IIHF Challenge Cup of Asia
- Appearances: 3 (first in 2015)
- Best result: 7th (2019)

International record (W–L–T)
- 8–27–0

Medal record

GCC Gulf Championship
Bronze medal – third place	2012 Abu Dhabi	

The Omani national ice hockey team (Arabic: منتخب عمان لهوكي الجليد), nicknamed The Khanjars (Arabic: الخنجر Al-Khanajar), is the national ice hockey team of Oman. The team is controlled by the Oman Ice Sports Committee and has been an associate member of the International Ice Hockey Federation (IIHF). Oman is not ranked in the IIHF World Ranking and has not entered in any World Championship tournaments or at any Olympic Games, but have played in the Challenge Cup of Asia, a regional tournament for lower-tier ice hockey nations in Asia. Oman is placed 25th in the specialized Asian ranking.

== History ==
Oman played its first game in 2010 during the inaugural Gulf Ice Hockey Championship. Oman played three games against Kuwait, Saudi Arabia, and the United Arab Emirates in which they lost all three games. Oman also played in the Second Ice Hockey Gulf Cup in 2012. They played 5 games of which they won two and lost three, finishing in third place and winning the bronze medal.

== Tournament record ==
=== Challenge Cup of Asia ===
Year	Host	Result	Pld	W	OTW	OTL	L
2008 through 2014		Did not participate					
2015	Kuwait City	9th place (4th in Division I)	5	0	2	0	3
2016	(Kyrgyzstan) Bishkek	Did not participate					
2017	Kuwait City	8th place (3rd in Division I)	3	1	0	0	2
2018	(Malaysia) Kuala Lumpur	Did not participate					
2019	(Malaysia) Kuala Lumpur	7th place	4	1	0	0	3
Total		3/12	12	2	2	0	8

=== GCC Gulf Championship ===
Year	Host	Result	Pld	W	OTW	OTL	L
2010	Kuwait City	4th place	3	0	0	0	3
2012	(United Arab Emirates) Abu Dhabi	3rd Place	5	2	0	0	3
2014	Kuwait City	4th place	5	1	0	0	4
2016	(Qatar) Doha	4th place	5	0	0	0	5
Total		4/4	18	3	0	0	15

== Roster ==
Roster for the 2019 IIHF Challenge Cup of Asia.

Head coach: (Pakistan) Khalid Muhamad (خالد محمد)

Goaltenders
#	Name	Catches	Height	Weight	Date of birth	Club
30	Mohamed Al Balushi (محمد البلوشي)	R	1.86 m	83 kg	18 July 1993 (aged 25)	Oman
69	Waleed Al Ruzaiqi (وليد الرزيقي)	R	1.75 m	65 kg	11 June 1991 (aged 27)	Oman
Defencemen
#	Name	Shoots	Height	Weight	Date of birth	Club
19	Saud Al Aufi (سعود العوفي)	L	1.70 m	79 kg	31 August 1985 (aged 33)	Oman
77	Said Al Hinai (سعيد الهنائي)	R	1.75 m	90 kg	6 June 1990 (aged 28)	Oman
4	Mohanad Al Larakha (مهند اللرخة)	R	1.76 m	90 kg	25 March 1983 (aged 35)	Oman
66	Ahmad Al Qatami (أحمد القطامي)	R	1.70 m	67 kg	6 January 1987 (aged 32)	Oman
94	Hamdoon khalaf ( حمدون خلف)	R	1.89 m	96 kg	30 October 1986 (aged 32)	Oman
99	Muadh Al Siyabi (معاذ السيابي)	L	1.74 m	68 kg	26 February 1987 (aged 32)	Oman
44	Khalil Al Waili (خليل الوائلي)	L	1.70 m	75 kg	20 March 1983 (aged 35)	Oman
Forwards
#	Name	Shoots	Height	Weight	Date of birth	Club
9	Jihad Al Balushi (جهاد البلوشي)	R	1.72 m	75 kg	19 January 1989 (aged 30)	Oman
65	Talal Al Busaidi (طلال البوسعيدي)	L	1.67 m	82 kg	16 April 1996 (aged 22)	Oman
7	Ibrahim Al Ghabshi (ابراهيم الغبشي)	R	1.67 m	63 kg	1 January 1989 (aged 30)	Oman
96	Aziz Al Jadidi (عزيز الجديدي)	L	1.74 m	66 kg	9 February 1995 (aged 24)	Oman
3	Harith Al Sabri (حارث الصبري)	R	1.73 m	80 kg	24 December 1991 (aged 27)	Oman
6	Qusay Al Salti (قصي السلطي)	L	1.72 m	72 kg	30 October 1991 (aged 27)	Oman
88	Hussam Al Shahi (حسام الشاهي)	R	1.71 m	68 kg	26 August 1988 (aged 30)	Oman

== All-time record against other nations ==
Last match update: 14 February 2026

Team	GP	W	T	L	GF	GA
Bahrain	6	6	0	0	33	12
Egypt	1	1	0	0	9	4
India	2	1	0	1	8	8
Indonesia	2	0	0	2	7	9
Iran	1	0	0	1	6	12
Kuwait	11	0	0	11	13	94
Kyrgyzstan	1	0	0	1	3	7
Lebanon	1	0	1	0	5	15
Macau	3	2	0	1	10	8
Malaysia	1	1	0	0	8	7
Philippines	1	0	0	1	0	9
Qatar	3	1	0	2	14	15
Saudi Arabia	1	0	0	1	1	3
Singapore	1	0	0	1	3	12
United Arab Emirates	6	0	0	6	9	47
Total	41	12	1	28	129	262
