= Gulf Ice Hockey Championship =

International ice hockey competition in the Middle East

- Current season, competition or edition: 2016 Gulf Ice Hockey Championship
- Sport: Ice hockey
- Founded: 2010
- No. of teams: 4
- Most recent champion: United Arab Emirates

The Gulf Ice Hockey Championship, also known as the GCC Gulf Ice Hockey Championships, is an international ice hockey competition involving countries from the Gulf Cooperation Council (GCC) region. The inaugural tournament took place on May 25 to May 30 in Kuwait City, Kuwait, and was organized by the Kuwait Ice Hockey Association. The championship has featured teams from six countries since its formation and currently consists of Kuwait, Oman, Qatar and the United Arab Emirates. The United Arab Emirates has won all four editions of the championship, while Kuwait has finished second on three occasions and Qatar on one.

== History ==
The Gulf Ice Hockey Championship was first held in 2010 in Kuwait City, Kuwait. The tournament was organised by the Kuwait Ice Hockey Association and involved four teams from the Gulf Cooperation Council (GCC) region. Kuwait, Oman, Saudi Arabia and the United Arab Emirates participated in the inaugural tournament with the United Arab Emirates going on to win the tournament. After showing interest in hosting a 2011 competition, the United Arab Emirates held the second Gulf Ice Hockey Championship in 2012 in Abu Dhabi. Saudi Arabia did not enter the competition, however Bahrain joined to keep the tournament at four teams. The United Arab Emirates successfully defended their title after winning the gold medal game against Kuwait. The 2014 edition of the tournament saw Bahrain drop out of the tournament and were replaced by Qatar. The United Arab won the competition for the third time after defeating 5–0 in the final while Qatar beat Oman to win bronze. In 2016 the tournament was hosted by Qatar for the first time, with all four teams from the 2014 edition returning. Qatar made its first final appearance after defeating Kuwait in the semifinal; however, it lost to the United Arab Emirates in the final, giving the United Arab Emirates their fourth title.

== Results ==
Year	Host	(gold) Gold	(silver) Silver	(bronze) Bronze
2010; Details	Kuwait City	United Arab Emirates	Kuwait	Saudi Arabia
2012; Details	(United Arab Emirates) Abu Dhabi	United Arab Emirates	Kuwait	Oman
2014; Details	Kuwait City	United Arab Emirates	Kuwait	Qatar
2016; Details	(Qatar) Doha	United Arab Emirates	Qatar	Kuwait
2022; Details	Kuwait City	United Arab Emirates	Saudi Arabia	Kuwait
