= Ice hockey in the United Arab Emirates =

- Country: United Arab Emirates
- Governing body: UAE Ice Hockey Association
- National teams: Men's national team; Women's national team
- Clubs: Emirates Ice Hockey League

Ice hockey is a minor sport that is gaining popularity in United Arab Emirates. The premier ice hockey league in the UAE is the Emirates Ice Hockey League (EHL), which began in 2009. The U.A.E. Ice Hockey Association is one of the few sports associations recognized by the United Arab Emirates government.

In 2018, Vladimir Burdun was appointed as the new president of the EHL. His role was to strengthen the UAE ice hockey team and attract more business opportunities.

In 2019, Burdun announced the goal of entering a team into the Kontinental Hockey League (KHL), which formerly involved teams from Belarus, China, Finland, Latvia, Kazakhstan, and Russia, by 2021. He also aimed at getting more players ready for the KHL. A new ice arena was expected to open in Abu Dhabi in 2019, designed to meet all the requirements of the KHL. The plan was to replicate the recent success of an NHL team situated in the desert, Vegas Golden Knights. NHL and KHL stars such as Pavel Datsyuk, Sergei Mozyakin, Alexander Ovechkin were discussed as possible additions to the league to increase competitiveness.

There are currently a few small ice rink venues operating in the United Arab Emirates, notably in Abu Dhabi and Al-Ain, where local enthusiasts and amateur players can enjoy recreational skating and hockey. These facilities, while limited in size and capacity, have played an important role in nurturing the early development of ice sports in the region. However, a major step forward for the sport is expected with the opening of the Emirates Sports Arena at Dubai Sports City, which is projected to launch sometime in 2025. With a seating capacity of approximately 600 spectators, the new arena will offer a more professional and spectator-friendly venue for ice hockey and other ice-based events.
