= Egypt men's national ice hockey team =

Egypt
- Head coach: Yasser Ahmed
- Assistants: Abdulazim Mustapha; Sheref Elbassiouny; Khaled Abdelrahman
- Captain: Sameh Ramadan
- Team colors

First international
- Oman 9–4 Egypt (Kuwait City, Kuwait; 7 May 2023)

Biggest win
- Egypt 8–0 Chile (Coral Springs, United States; 22 August 2024)

Biggest defeat
- Lebanon 7–0 Egypt (Kuwait City, Kuwait; 8 May 2023)

Arab Cup
- Appearances: 1 (first in 2023)
- Best result: 7th (2023)

International record (W–L–T)
- 5–5–1

The Egypt national ice hockey team (Arabic: منتخب مصر لهوكي الجليد) is the national men's ice hockey team of Egypt. Egypt is not a member of the IIHF and does not have a national ice hockey governing body, but has competed internationally including at the 2023 Arab Cup. Currently, as there is no official National Egyptian Ice Hockey team the unofficial group of players from youth to adult generally compete under the private moniker entitled Egypt Ice Hockey.

== History ==
Ice hockey in Egypt was first played recreationally in 2002 at the Maadi Family Land Ice Rink in Cairo. Beginning in 2016, an unofficial club team representing Egypt, the Pharaohs, has played against other club teams in the region, including at the 2018 and 2020 Arab Club Championship. The Pharaohs also competed in and won Division II of the 2022 Amerigol LATAM Cup, a tournament for teams mostly from Latin America and the Caribbean. The team is often registered as the Egypt Ice Hockey Club. A preliminary membership group consisting of managing members aiming to increase ice hockey exposure in Egypt was appointed officially by the Egyptian Olympic Committee which is an extension of the cabinet level Egyptian government. No official federation has been registered and no full sized IIHF approved rink exists in Egypt today.

Egypt's first game as an official national team was at the 2023 Arab Cup in Kuwait, where they lost to Oman 9–4. The second game against the eventual Arab Cup champion, Lebanon, was their biggest international loss (7–0). Egypt's third game was supposed to be against Saudi Arabia, but their opposition was unofficially represented at the tournament by Jeddah Eagles. Jeddah Eagles still played their scheduled game against Egypt on 10 May 2023, resulting the club lose 7–0. However, the Egyptian national team's win against club or "B" team did not count towards Egypt's official international record.

== Tournament record ==
=== Arab Cup ===
Year	Host	Result	Pld	W	OTW	OTL	L
2023	Kuwait City	7th place	5	2	0	0	3
Total		1/1	5	2	0	0	3

=== Amerigol LATAM Cup ===
Year	Host	Result	Pld	W	OTW	OTL	L
2022	(United States) Coral Springs	Competed unofficially in Division II as the Pharaohs club team					
2023	(United States) Coral Springs	4th place (Division II)	5	3	0	0	2
Total		1/1	5	3	0	0	2

== Current roster ==
Roster for the 2023 Arab Cup of Ice Hockey.

Head coach: Yasser Ahmed

Pos.	No.	Name	Birthdate	Club
G	36	Adam Sabh	7 November 1988 (aged 34)	Egypt Pharaohs
G	39	Andrew Salah	31 July 1990 (aged 32)	Egypt Pharaohs
D	4	Hassan Abdelaal	17 February 1985 (aged 38)	Egypt Pharaohs
D	91	Ryan Bahl	3 June 1989 (aged 33)	(Falkland Islands) ROTW
D	26	Alexander Burdekin	24 September 1992 (aged 30)	(Germany) Eifel-Mosel Bären
D	72	Robert Menes	23 September 1972 (aged 50)	Egypt Pharaohs
D	98	Samuel Munson	20 June 2001 (aged 21)	Unattached
D	3	Sulaiman Mustapha	21 November 1996 (aged 26)	(United States) University of Toledo
D	10	Yaseen Mustapha	9 June 1999 (aged 23)	Egypt Pharaohs
D	44	Michel Tebechrani	6 May 1984 (aged 38)	Egypt Pharaohs
F	67	Andrew Botros	21 May 2004 (aged 18)	(United States) Ontario Jr. Reign
F	21	Mathieu Courchesne Ishak	31 August 1998 (aged 24)	Egypt Pharaohs
F	9	Mahmoud Ghonaim	12 August 1988 (aged 34)	Egypt Pharaohs
F	23	Abdurrahman Mustapha	11 January 1991 (aged 32)	Egypt Pharaohs
F	19	Salahadin Mustapha	16 June 1995 (aged 27)	Egypt Pharaohs
F	22	Sameh Ramadan (C)	22 March 1983 (aged 40)	Egypt Pharaohs
F	6	Samy Sabh	23 February 1991 (aged 32)	Egypt Pharaohs
F	8	Ahmet Shehata	18 September 1997 (aged 25)	Unattached
F	96	Sammy Traxler	5 May 1996 (aged 27)	(Switzerland) EHC Dübendorf
F	53	Austin Whelan	22 May 1998 (aged 24)	(United States) Curry College

== All-time record against other national teams ==
Last match update: 30 May 2025

Key
Positive balance (more Wins)
Neutral balance (Wins = Losses)
Negative balance (more Losses)

Team	GP	W	T	L	GF	GA
Algeria	3	0	1	2	10	20
Brazil	1	1	0	0	5	1
Chile	2	2	0	0	16	0
Colombia	1	1	0	0	8	2
Lebanon	2	0	0	2	0	12
Morocco	1	1	0	0	3	2
Oman	1	0	0	1	4	9
Puerto Rico	1	1	0	0	5	1
Total	12	6	1	5	51	47

== All-time record against clubs and B teams ==
Last match update: 26 August 2023

Team	GP	W	T	L	GF	GA
Armenia HC	2	0	0	2	5	10
Central America	1	1	0	0	8	2
(Lebanon) Flying Cedars HC B	1	1	0	0	5	0
(Saudi Arabia) Jeddah Eagles	2	2	0	0	16	4
Total	6	4	0	2	34	16

== See also ==
- Ice hockey in Africa
- Algeria men's national ice hockey team
- Morocco men's national ice hockey team
- South Africa men's national ice hockey team
- Tunisia men's national ice hockey team
