= 2023 Arab Cup of Ice Hockey =

Tournament held in Kuwait

Tournament details
- Host country: Kuwait
- Venue: 1 (in 1 host city)
- Dates: 7–13 May 2023
- Teams: 8

Final positions
- Champions: Lebanon (1st title)
- Runners-up: Kuwait
- Third place: Oman

Tournament statistics
- Games played: 20
- Goals scored: 242 (12.1 per game)
- Attendance: 2,550 (128 per game)
- Scoring leader: (Oman) Artyom Sursov (23 points)

The 2023 Arab Cup of Ice Hockey (Arabic: كأس العرب لهوكي الجليد 2023) was the second edition of the Arab Cup of Ice Hockey held by the Arab Ice Hockey Federation. The tournament was held in Kuwait from 7 to 13 May 2023 and was the first edition held since 2008.

Lebanon won its first Arab Cup after defeating hosts Kuwait 9–4 in the final, becoming the second team to win the Arab Cup title with an undefeated record after the United Arab Emirates in 2008. Kuwait awarded the silver medal, their second consecutive silver medal in the Arab Cup. Oman won the bronze medal after defeating Bahrain 6–3.

== Participants ==
Group A
- Algeria
- Bahrain
- Kuwait (hosts)
- Tunisia
Group B
- Egypt
- Lebanon
- Oman
- Jeddah Eagles*

*Saudi Arabia was unofficially represented at the tournament by the Jeddah Eagles club team.

== Preliminary round ==
All times are Arabia Standard Time (UTC+3).

=== Group A ===
Pos	Team	Pld	W	OTW	OTL	L	GF	GA	GD	Pts	Qualification
1	Kuwait (H)	3	3	0	0	0	23	10	+13	9	Semifinals
2	Bahrain	3	1	1	0	1	17	13	+4	5	Semifinals
3	Tunisia	3	1	0	0	2	13	22	−9	3	
4	Algeria	3	0	0	1	2	11	19	−8	1	

Rules for classification: 1) points; 2) head-to-head points; 3) head-to-head goal difference; 4) head-to-head number of goals scored; 5) result against closest best-ranked team outside tied teams; 6) result against second-best ranked team outside tied teams; 7) seeding before tournament.
(H) Host

7 May 2023; 13:30	Bahrain	6–5 OT (0–2, 3–1, 2–2) (OT: 1–0)	Algeria	Kuwait Winter Games Club Ice Skating Rink, Kuwait City; Attendance: 120

Game reference
10 min	Penalties	16 min
50	Shots	28

7 May 2023; 20:30	Kuwait	11–4 (3–1, 6–1, 2–2)	Tunisia	Kuwait Winter Games Club Ice Skating Rink, Kuwait City; Attendance: 0

Game reference
20 min	Penalties	20 min
38	Shots	20

8 May 2023; 13:30	Tunisia	7–4 (1–1, 3–1, 3–2)	Algeria	Kuwait Winter Games Club Ice Skating Rink, Kuwait City; Attendance: 110

Game reference
12 min	Penalties	22 min
26	Shots	22

8 May 2023; 20:30	Kuwait	6–4 (1–2, 4–1, 1–1)	Bahrain	Kuwait Winter Games Club Ice Skating Rink, Kuwait City; Attendance: 200

Game reference
34 min	Penalties	30 min
36	Shots	17

10 May 2023; 13:30	Tunisia	2–7 (0–0, 0–4, 2–3)	Bahrain	Kuwait Winter Games Club Ice Skating Rink, Kuwait City; Attendance: 150

Game reference
26 min	Penalties	28 min
32	Shots	38

10 May 2023; 20:30	Algeria	2–6 (0–3, 2–1, 0–2)	Kuwait	Kuwait Winter Games Club Ice Skating Rink, Kuwait City; Attendance: 200

Game reference
26 min	Penalties	20 min
26	Shots	52

=== Group B ===
Pos	Team	Pld	W	OTW	OTL	L	GF	GA	GD	Pts	Qualification
1	Lebanon	3	3	0	0	0	29	6	+23	9	Semifinals
2	Oman	3	2	0	0	1	24	22	+2	6	Semifinals
3	Egypt	3	1	0	0	2	11	16	−5	3	
4	Jeddah Eagles	3	0	0	0	3	4	24	−20	0	

Rules for classification: 1) points; 2) head-to-head points; 3) head-to-head goal difference; 4) head-to-head number of goals scored; 5) result against closest best-ranked team outside tied teams; 6) result against second-best ranked team outside tied teams; 7) seeding before tournament.

7 May 2023; 10:00	Oman	9–4 (2–0, 3–2, 4–2)	Egypt	Kuwait Winter Games Club Ice Skating Rink, Kuwait City; Attendance: 100

Game reference
8 min	Penalties	18 min
39	Shots	40

7 May 2023; 17:00	Jeddah Eagles	1–7 (0–2, 0–5, 1–0)	Lebanon	Kuwait Winter Games Club Ice Skating Rink, Kuwait City; Attendance: 150

Game reference
6 min	Penalties	10 min
13	Shots	24

8 May 2023; 10:00	Lebanon	7–0 (3–0, 2–0, 2–0)	Egypt	Kuwait Winter Games Club Ice Skating Rink, Kuwait City; Attendance: 100

Game reference
12 min	Penalties	32 min
33	Shots	13

8 May 2023; 17:00	Jeddah Eagles	3–10 (0–5, 0–3, 3–2)	Oman	Kuwait Winter Games Club Ice Skating Rink, Kuwait City; Attendance: 150

Game reference
20 min	Penalties	24 min
31	Shots	35

10 May 2023; 10:00	Lebanon	15–5 (2–1, 4–2, 9–2)	Oman	Kuwait Winter Games Club Ice Skating Rink, Kuwait City; Attendance: 0

Game reference
16 min	Penalties	23 min
43	Shots	42

10 May 2023; 17:00	Egypt	7–0 (1–0, 2–0, 4–0)	Jeddah Eagles	Kuwait Winter Games Club Ice Skating Rink, Kuwait City; Attendance: 120

Game reference
20 min	Penalties	10 min
58	Shots	30

== Playoff round ==
=== Bracket ===
Semifinals
A1	Kuwait	13
B2	Oman	3
B1	Lebanon	8
A2	Bahrain	1

Gold medal game
A1	Kuwait	4
B1	Lebanon	9
Bronze medal game
A2	Bahrain	3
B2	Oman	6

5th place bracket

5th–8th place semifinals
A3	Tunisia	24
B4	Jeddah Eagles	3
B3	Egypt	3
A4	Algeria	8

5th place game
A3	Tunisia	4
A4	Algeria	8
7th place game
B3	Egypt	9
B4	Jeddah Eagles	4

=== 5th–8th place semifinals ===
11 May 2023; 10:00	Tunisia	24–3 (8–1, 6–0, 10–2)	Jeddah Eagles	Kuwait Winter Games Club Ice Skating Rink, Kuwait City; Attendance: 90

Game reference
22 min	Penalties	27 min
52	Shots	38

11 May 2023; 13:30	Egypt	3–8 (0–2, 2–5, 1–1)	Algeria	Kuwait Winter Games Club Ice Skating Rink, Kuwait City; Attendance: 0

Game reference
16 min	Penalties	12 min
27	Shots	30

=== Semifinals ===
11 May 2023; 17:00	Lebanon	8–1 (3–0, 2–0, 3–1)	Bahrain	Kuwait Winter Games Club Ice Skating Rink, Kuwait City; Attendance: 160

Game reference
42 min	Penalties	42 min
42	Shots	46

11 May 2023; 20:30	Kuwait	13–3 (5–0, 5–2, 3–1)	Oman	Kuwait Winter Games Club Ice Skating Rink, Kuwait City; Attendance: 200

Game reference
8 min	Penalties	4 min
89	Shots	37

=== 7th place game ===
13 May 2023; 10:00	Egypt	9–4 (2–2, 2–2, 5–0)	Jeddah Eagles	Kuwait Winter Games Club Ice Skating Rink, Kuwait City; Attendance: 100

Game reference
12 min	Penalties	6 min
28	Shots	35

=== 5th place game ===
13 May 2023; 13:30	Tunisia	4–8 (1–5, 2–2, 1–1)	Algeria	Kuwait Winter Games Club Ice Skating Rink, Kuwait City; Attendance: 120

Game reference
10 min	Penalties	18 min
104	Shots	48

=== Bronze medal game ===
13 May 2023; 17:00	Bahrain	3–6 (0–0, 1–4, 2–2)	Oman	Kuwait Winter Games Club Ice Skating Rink, Kuwait City; Attendance: 130

Game reference
4 min	Penalties	10 min
78	Shots	38

=== Gold medal game ===
13 May 2023; 20:30	Kuwait	4–9 (3–3, 1–2, 0–4)	Lebanon	Kuwait Winter Games Club Ice Skating Rink, Kuwait City; Attendance: 350

Game reference
29 min	Penalties	28 min
36	Shots	40

== Final ranking ==
2023 Arab Cup of Ice Hockey

Lebanon
1st title

Rk	Team
1st place, gold medalist(s)	Lebanon
2nd place, silver medalist(s)	Kuwait
3rd place, bronze medalist(s)	Oman
4	Bahrain
5	Algeria
6	Tunisia
7	Egypt
8	Jeddah Eagles

== Statistics ==
=== Scoring leaders ===
List shows the top ten skaters sorted by points, then goals.

Player	GP	G	A	Pts	+/–	PIM	Pos
(Oman) Artyom Sursov	5	9	14	23	+6	10	F
(Kuwait) Ilya Drozdetskikh	5	15	4	19	+15	24	F
(Kuwait) Valeri Budevich	5	7	8	15	+9	6	F
(Kuwait) Anton Tsybin	5	4	10	14	+16	8	D
(Tunisia) Youssef Chaouachi	4	9	4	13	0	2	F
(Bahrain) Nikita Shpakov	5	8	5	13	+7	12	F
(Oman) Alexei Baskov	5	6	7	13	+5	10	F
(Tunisia) Adrien Sebag	5	6	7	13	+2	10	F
(Kuwait) Bojan Zidarević	5	2	11	13	+17	6	F
(Oman) Grigori Yakovlev	5	5	7	12	+12	6	F

=== Goaltending leaders ===
Only the top five goaltenders, based on save percentage, who have played at least 40% of their team's minutes, are included in this list.

Player	TOI	GA	GAA	SA	SV%	SO
(Lebanon) Gabriel Waked	177:00	5	1.70	90	94.73	1
(Lebanon) Issam Ghotmeh	124:00	6	2.91	58	90.62	0
(Algeria) Yacine Chemrouk	240:00	21	5.25	199	90.45	0
(Oman) Bogdan Donenko	189:00	24	7.66	185	88.51	0
(Bahrain) Igor Tyalo	180:00	14	4.67	91	86.67	0
