= 2013 IIHF Challenge Cup of Asia =

Tournament details
- Host country: Thailand
- Dates: 16–24 March 2013
- Teams: 10

Final positions
- Champions: Chinese Taipei (3rd title)
- Runner-up: Hong Kong
- Third place: Mongolia

Tournament statistics
- Games played: 28
- Goals scored: 293 (10.46 per game)

The 2013 IIHF Challenge Cup of Asia was the 6th IIHF Challenge Cup of Asia, an annual international ice hockey tournament held by the International Ice Hockey Federation (IIHF). It took place between 16 March and 24 March 2013 in Bangkok, Thailand. The Chinese Taipei won the tournament after defeating Hong Kong in the final and Mongolia finished in third after defeating Kuwait in the bronze medal match. The defending champions, the United Emirates were knocked out of the playoff round in the quarterfinals by Hong Kong.

== Overview ==
The 2013 IIHF Challenge Cup of Asia began on 16 March 2013 in Bangkok, Thailand. The tournament was split into two groups of five for the preliminary round, with both groups competing in a round robin format. Group A consists of Chinese Taipei, Kuwait, Malaysia, Thailand and the United Arab Emirates. While Group B is made up of Hong Kong, India, Macau, Mongolia and Singapore. After the preliminary round all five teams from Group A enter the quarterfinals along with the top three teams from Group B.

Chinese Taipei won the tournament after they defeated Hong Kong 4–2 in the final, claiming their third IIHF Challenge Cup of Asia title. Mongolia finished third after winning the bronze medal game against Kuwait. Khaled Al Suwaidi of the United Arab Emirates was named the tournament's top goaltender by the IIHF directorate. Thai Likit Neimwann was named the top defenceman and Ban Kin Loke of Malaysia was selected as the top forward. Jasper Tang of Hong Kong finished the tournament as the top scorer with 19 points including nine goals and ten assists. Chinese Taipei's Ting Pang-Keng was the leading goaltender based on save percentage with a percentage of 0.937.

== Group stage ==
=== Group A ===
Pos	Team	Pld	W	OTW	OTL	L	GF	GA	GD	Pts	Qualification
1	Chinese Taipei	4	3	1	0	0	31	5	+26	11	Quarter-finals
2	Thailand	4	3	0	0	1	31	12	+19	9	Quarter-finals
3	United Arab Emirates	4	2	0	1	1	16	7	+9	7	Quarter-finals
4	Kuwait	4	1	0	0	3	8	31	−23	3	Quarter-finals
5	Malaysia	4	0	0	0	4	7	38	−31	0	Quarter-finals

Source: IIHF

All times local. (UTC+7:00)

16 March 2013; 13:30	Malaysia	1 – 7 (0–1, 1–3, 0–3)	United Arab Emirates	Arena; Attendance: 140

Game reference

16 March 2013; 20:30	Kuwait	0 – 10 (0–1, 0–4, 0–5)	Thailand	Arena; Attendance: 647

Game reference

17 March 2013; 20:30	Chinese Taipei	13 – 1 (4–1, 6–0, 3–0)	Kuwait	Arena; Attendance: 236

Game reference

18 March 2013; 13:30	Thailand	16 – 3 (6–2, 3–1, 7–0)	Malaysia	Arena; Attendance: 125

Game reference

18 March 2013; 20:30	United Arab Emirates	1 – 2 (1–0, 0–0, 0–1, 0-1)	Chinese Taipei	Arena; Attendance: 267

Game reference

19 March 2013; 20:30	Kuwait	1 – 6 (0–2, 0–2, 1–2)	United Arab Emirates	Arena; Attendance: 95

Game reference

20 March 2013; 10:00	Thailand	2 – 7 (1–3, 1–2, 0–2)	Chinese Taipei	Arena; Attendance: 225

Game reference

20 March 2013; 17:00	Malaysia	2 – 6 (1–1, 0–2, 1–3)	Kuwait	Arena; Attendance: 95

Game reference

21 March 2013; 13:30	United Arab Emirates	2 – 3 (0–2, 2–1, 0–0)	Thailand	Arena; Attendance: 422

Game reference

21 March 2013; 20:30	Chinese Taipei	9 – 1 (2–0, 3–0, 4–1)	Malaysia	Arena; Attendance: 76

Game reference

=== Group B ===
Pos	Team	Pld	W	OTW	OTL	L	GF	GA	GD	Pts	Qualification
1	Hong Kong	4	4	0	0	0	47	3	+44	12	Quarter-finals
2	Mongolia	4	3	0	0	1	32	10	+22	9	Quarter-finals
3	Macau	4	2	0	0	2	16	20	−4	6	Quarter-finals
4	Singapore	4	1	0	0	3	19	23	−4	3	Did not advance
5	India	4	0	0	0	4	5	63	−58	0	Did not advance

Source: IIHF

All times local. (UTC+7:00)

16 March 2013; 10:00	Mongolia	20 – 0 (5–0, 6–0, 9–0)	India	Arena; Attendance: 89

Game reference

16 March 2013; 17:00	Singapore	4 – 6 (1–1, 2–2, 1–3)	Macau	Arena; Attendance: 121

Game reference

17 March 2013; 17:00	Hong Kong	10 – 0 (4–0, 4–0, 2–0)	Singapore	Arena; Attendance: 120

Game reference

18 March 2013; 10:00	Macau	1 – 6 (0–2, 1–3, 0–1)	Mongolia	Arena; Attendance: 54

Game reference

18 March 2013; 17:00	India	0 – 21 (0–6, 0–7, 0–8)	Hong Kong	Arena; Attendance: 109

Game reference

19 March 2013; 17:00	Singapore	13 – 4 (4–1, 3–1, 6–2)	India	Arena; Attendance: 68

Game reference

20 March 2013; 13:30	Macau	0 – 9 (0–2, 0–3, 0–4)	Hong Kong	Arena; Attendance: 65

Game reference

20 March 2013; 20:30	Mongolia	3 – 2 (0–1, 2–1, 1–0)	Singapore	Arena; Attendance: 85

Game reference

21 March 2013; 10:00	India	1 – 9 (0–2, 1–4, 0–3)	Macau	Arena; Attendance: 53

Game reference

21 March 2013; 17:00	Hong Kong	7 – 3 (2–0, 4–2, 1–1)	Mongolia	Arena; Attendance: 89

Game reference

== Playoff round ==
=== Bracket ===
Quarterfinals
A1	Chinese Taipei	11
B3	Macau	0
A4	Kuwait	4
A5	Malaysia	3
A2	Thailand	4
B2	Mongolia	5
A3	United Arab Emirates	3
B1	Hong Kong	6

Semifinals
A1	Chinese Taipei	21
A4	Kuwait	0
B2	Mongolia	3
B1	Hong Kong	4

Final
A1	Chinese Taipei	4
B1	Hong Kong	2
Third place
A4	Kuwait	0
B2	Mongolia	11

=== Quarter-finals ===
All times local. (UTC+7:00)

22 March 2013; 10:00	Chinese Taipei	11 – 0 (8–0, 0–0, 3–0)	Macau	Arena; Attendance: 54

Game reference

22 March 2013; 13:30	United Arab Emirates	3 – 6 (1–2, 1–1, 1–3)	Hong Kong	Arena; Attendance: 86

Game reference

22 March 2013; 17:00	Thailand	4 – 5 (1–2, 2–1, 1–2)	Mongolia	Arena; Attendance: 437

Game reference

22 March 2013; 20:30	Kuwait	4 – 3 (1–2, 3–0, 0–1)	Malaysia	Arena; Attendance: 65

Game reference

=== Semifinals ===
All times local. (UTC+7:00)

23 March 2013; 17:00	Mongolia	3 – 4 (0–2, 0–1, 3–1)	Hong Kong	Arena; Attendance: 228

Game reference

23 March 2013; 20:30	Chinese Taipei	21 – 0 (4–0, 10–0, 7–0)	Kuwait	Arena; Attendance: 115

Game reference

=== Bronze medal game ===
Time is local. (UTC+7:00)

24 March 2013; 14:30	Kuwait	0 – 11 (0–3, 0–2, 0–6)	Mongolia	Arena; Attendance: 235

Game reference

=== Gold medal game ===
Time is local. (UTC+7:00)

24 March 2013; 18:00	Chinese Taipei	4 – 2 (1–0, 2–1, 1–1)	Hong Kong	Arena; Attendance: 545

Game reference

== Statistics ==
=== Scoring leaders ===
List shows the top ten skaters sorted by points, then goals, assists, and the lower penalties in minutes.

Player	GP	G	A	Pts	+/-	PIM	POS
(Hong Kong) Jasper Tang	7	9	10	19	+21	0	F
(Chinese Taipei) Weng To	7	11	6	17	+16	8	F
(Mongolia) Mishigsuren Namjil	7	4	13	17	+15	6	F
(Mongolia) Bayarsaikhan Jargalsaikhan	7	4	12	16	+16	33	F
(Chinese Taipei) Shen Yen-Chin	7	8	6	14	+19	2	F
(Hong Kong) Alvin Sham	7	6	8	14	+18	6	F
(Thailand) Tewin Chartsuwan	5	10	3	13	+4	8	F
(Chinese Taipei) Chang Kai-Hsiang	7	10	3	13	+16	2	F
(Hong Kong) Donald Tse	7	9	4	13	+18	2	F
(Hong Kong) Leo Kan	7	5	7	12	+16	2	F
(Chinese Taipei) Lin Hung-Ju	7	5	7	12	+20	4	F

=== Leading goaltenders ===
Only the top goaltenders, based on save percentage, who have played at least 40% of their team's minutes are included in this list.

Player	MIP	SOG	GA	GAA	SVS%
(Chinese Taipei) Ting Pang-Keng	271:09	95	6	1.33	93.68
(Hong Kong) Emerson Kwokway Keung	345:13	155	13	2.26	91.61
(Mongolia) Munkhbold Bayarsaikhan	392:53	156	18	2.75	88.46
(United Arab Emirates) Khaled Al Suwaidi	244:22	101	12	2.95	88.12
(Thailand) Prakpoom Thongaram	184:10	63	8	2.61	87.30
