= 2010 IIHF Challenge Cup of Asia =

Tournament details
- Host country: Taiwan
- Venue(s): Taipei Arena (in 1 host city)
- Dates: March 29 – April 2
- Teams: 9

Final positions
- Champions: Chinese Taipei (2nd title)
- Runner-up: United Arab Emirates
- Third place: Thailand

Tournament statistics
- Games played: 24

The 2010 IIHF Challenge Cup of Asia took place in Taiwan from 29 March to 4 April. It was the third annual event, and was run by the International Ice Hockey Federation (IIHF). The games were played in the Taipei Arena in Taipei City. Chinese Taipei won the championship, winning four of its five games and defeating United Arab Emirates in the final 3–2.

== Group stage ==
Nine participating teams were placed in the following two groups. After playing a round-robin, the teams move to the preliminary round to decide the final ranking.

=== Group A ===
Team	Pld	W	D	L	GF	GA	GD	Pts	Qualification
United Arab Emirates	3	2	1	0	3	1	+2	7	Medal playoffs
Chinese Taipei	3	2	0	1	11	3	+8	6	Medal playoffs
Hong Kong	3	1	1	1	3	4	−1	4	5th–8th playoffs
Mongolia	3	0	0	3	1	10	−9	0	5th–8th playoffs

All times local.

March 29, 2010; 17:00	Mongolia	0 – 1	United Arab Emirates	Taipei Arena, Taipei City

Game reference

March 30, 2010; 17:30	Mongolia	0 – 7	Chinese Taipei	Taipei Arena, Taipei City

Game reference

March 31, 2010; 14:30	Chinese Taipei	3 – 1	Hong Kong	Taipei Arena, Taipei City

Game reference

April 1, 2010; 17:00	United Arab Emirates	0 – 0	Hong Kong	Taipei Arena, Taipei City

Game reference

April 2, 2010; 14:30	United Arab Emirates	2 – 1	Chinese Taipei	Taipei Arena, Taipei City

Game reference

April 2, 2010; 19:30	Hong Kong	2 – 1	Mongolia	Taipei Arena, Taipei City

Game reference

=== Group B ===
Team	Pld	W	D	L	GF	GA	GD	Pts	Qualification
Thailand	4	4	0	0	28	1	+27	12	Medal playoffs
Malaysia	4	2	1	1	16	11	+5	7	Medal playoffs
Kuwait	4	1	1	2	7	14	−7	4	5th–8th playoffs
Macau	4	0	2	2	6	18	−12	2	5th–8th playoffs
Singapore	4	0	2	2	8	21	−13	2	Eliminated

All times local.

March 29, 2010; 14:30	Malaysia	5 – 1	Kuwait	Taipei Arena, Taipei City

Game reference

March 29, 2010; 19:30	Singapore	0 – 11	Thailand	Taipei Arena, Taipei City

Game reference

March 30, 2010; 14:30	Kuwait	0 – 5	Thailand	Taipei Arena, Taipei City

Game reference

March 30, 2010; 20:00	Singapore	3 – 3	Macau	Taipei Arena, Taipei City

Game reference

March 31, 2010; 17:00	Macau	1 – 7	Malaysia	Taipei Arena, Taipei City

Game reference

March 31, 2010; 19:30	Kuwait	4 – 2	Singapore	Taipei Arena, Taipei City

Game reference

April 1, 2010; 14:30	Thailand	6 – 1	Malaysia	Taipei Arena, Taipei City

Game reference

April 1, 2010; 19:30	Macau	2 – 2	Kuwait	Taipei Arena, Taipei City

Game reference

April 2, 2010; 12:00	Thailand	6 – 0	Macau	Taipei Arena, Taipei City

Game reference

April 2, 2010; 17:00	Malaysia	3 – 3	Singapore	Taipei Arena, Taipei City

Game reference

== Playoff round ==
=== 5th–8th playoffs ===
==== Bracket ====
Semi-finals
April 3
Kuwait	1
Mongolia	4
April 3
Hong Kong	2
Macau	0

Fifth place
April 4
Mongolia	2
Hong Kong	5
Seventh place
April 4
Kuwait	2
Macau	0

==== Semi-finals ====
April 3, 2010; 12:00	Kuwait	1 – 4	Mongolia	Taipei Arena, Taipei City

Game reference

April 3, 2010; 14:30	Hong Kong	2 – 0	Macau	Taipei Arena, Taipei City

Game reference

==== Seventh place ====
April 4, 2010; 12:00	Kuwait	2 – 0	Macau	Taipei Arena, Taipei City

Game reference

==== Fifth place ====
April 4, 2010; 14:30	Mongolia	2 – 5	Hong Kong	Taipei Arena, Taipei City

Game reference

=== Medal playoffs ===
==== Bracket ====
Semi-finals
April 3
Thailand	2
Chinese Taipei	4
April 3
United Arab Emirates	4
Malaysia	1

Finals
April 4
Chinese Taipei	3
United Arab Emirates	2
Third place
April 4
Thailand	5
Malaysia	2

==== Semi-finals ====
April 3, 2010; 17:00	Thailand	2 – 4	Chinese Taipei	Taipei Arena, Taipei City

Game reference

April 3, 2010; 19:30	United Arab Emirates	4 – 1	Malaysia	Taipei Arena, Taipei City

Game reference

==== Bronze medal game ====
April 4, 2010; 17:00	Thailand	5 – 2	Malaysia	Taipei Arena, Taipei City

Game reference

==== Gold medal game ====
April 4, 2010; 19:30	Chinese Taipei	3 – 2	United Arab Emirates	Taipei Arena, Taipei City

Game reference

== Ranking and statistics ==
2010 IIHF Challenge Cup of Asia

Chinese Taipei
2nd title

=== Tournament Awards ===
- Best players selected by the directorate:
  - Best Goalkeeper: (United Arab Emirates) Khaled Al Suvaidi
  - Best Defenseman: (Thailand) Neimwan Likit
  - Best Forward: (Malaysia) Ban Kin Loke

=== Final standings ===
1st place, gold medalist(s)	Chinese Taipei
2nd place, silver medalist(s)	United Arab Emirates
3rd place, bronze medalist(s)	Thailand
4	Malaysia
5	Hong Kong
6	Mongolia
7	Kuwait
8	Macau
9	Singapore

== See also ==
- List of sporting events in Taiwan
