= Saudi Arabia men's national ice hockey team =

Saudi Arabia
- Association: Saudi Winter Sports Federation
- Head coach: Petr Večko
- Captain: Mohamad Bahamdin
- Top scorer: Faisal Salama (3)
- Most points: Faisal Salama & Badr Alhazmi
- Home stadium: Al-Shallal Ice Rink
- Team colors: Green / White
- IIHF code: KSA

First international
- Kuwait 10–3 Saudi Arabia (Kuwait City, Kuwait; 25 May 2010)

Biggest win
- Saudi Arabia 5–2 Bahrain (Kuwait City, Kuwait; 25 May 2022)

Biggest defeat
- UAE 14–1 Saudi Arabia (Kuwait City, Kuwait; 27 May 2010)

Gulf Ice Hockey Championship
- Appearances: 1 (first in 2010)
- Best result: (2010)

GCC Games
- Appearances: 1 (first in 2022)
- Best result: (2022)

International record (W–L–T)
- 3–3–0

Medal record

GCC Gulf Championship
Bronze medal – third place	2010 Kuwait City	

GCC Games
Silver medal – second place	2022 Kuwait City	

The Saudi Arabia national ice hockey team (Arabic: منتخب المملكة العربية السعودية لهوكي الجليد) is the national men's ice hockey team of the Kingdom of Saudi Arabia. Saudi Arabia is not a member of the IIHF and therefore not eligible to enter any IIHF World Championship events.

== History ==
The Saudi Arabian Nationals first played ice hockey in the early 1990s. Ice hockey was played in Riyadh at the Fal Shopping Centre Ice Rink, a rink 1/3 the size of a standard North American-sized ice rink. In 1994, five Saudis were part of a team consisting of mostly ex-pats from Canada and Finland. This particular team was the winner of the Canuck Cup held in Dubai. A member of the team was Prince Ahmed Al-Saud, a fan of hockey after watching it played in New York. Saudi Arabia played its first game in 2010 during the Gulf Ice Hockey Championship which was held in Kuwait City, Kuwait. Saudi Arabia played three games losing its opener against Kuwait 10–3. In their second game in the tournament, Saudi Arabia was beaten by a larger margin then the first, losing to the United Arab Emirates 14–1. In their final game of the tournament, they won their first ever international game after they defeated Oman 3–1. Saudi Arabia finished third in the four team tournament with the UAE winning gold. Saudi Arabia has not been active until the 2022 GCC Games, but at the 2023 Arab Cup, Saudi Arabia was unofficially represented at the tournament by the Jeddah Eagles club team.

Saudi Arabia is not yet part of the official IIHF Ranking, but the specialized website AsianIceHockey.com has included the team in its AIH Ranking of Asian men’s national programs – currently placing them 30th.

== Tournament record ==
=== GCC Gulf Championship ===
Year	Host	Result	Pld	W	OTW	OTL	L
2010	Kuwait City	3rd place	3	1	0	0	2
Total		1/1	3	1	0	0	2

=== GCC Games ===
Year	Host	Result	Pld	W	OTW	OTL	L
2022	Kuwait City	2nd place	3	2	0	0	1
Total		1/1	3	2	0	0	1

== All-time record against other national teams ==
Last match update: 26 May 2022

Key
Positive balance (more Wins)
Neutral balance (Wins = Losses)
Negative balance (more Losses)

Team	GP	W	T	L	GF	GA
Bahrain	1	1	0	0	5	2
Kuwait	2	1	0	1	10	15
Oman	1	1	0	0	3	1
United Arab Emirates	2	0	0	2	2	19
Total	6	3	0	3	20	37
