= 2012 Gulf Ice Hockey Championship =

Tournament details
- Host country: United Arab Emirates
- Dates: 28 May – 1 June 2012
- Teams: 4

Final positions
- Champions: United Arab Emirates (2nd title)

Tournament statistics
- Games played: 10
- Goals scored: 105 (10.5 per game)

The 2012 Gulf Ice Hockey Championship was the second Gulf Ice Hockey Championship. It took place between 28 May and 1 June 2012 in Abu Dhabi, the United Arab Emirates. The United Arab Emirates won the tournament after defeating Kuwait in the gold medal game, claiming their second title of the championships. Oman finished third after defeating Bahrain in the bronze medal game.

== Overview ==
The 2012 Gulf Ice Hockey Championship began on 28 May 2012 in Abu Dhabi, the United Arab Emirates with the games being played at Zayed Sports City. The United Arab Emirates as host and defending champion returned along with Kuwait and Oman to compete in their second Gulf Ice Hockey Championship. Saudi Arabia who competed in the 2010 championship did not send a team while Bahrain made their first appearance in the competition. The four teams first competed in a round robin competition, with their ranking determining their seeding in the semi-finals. The United Arab Emirates finished in first place after the round robin and were seeded against fourth place Bahrain, while second place Kuwait was seeded with third place Oman. The United Arab Emirates and Kuwait both won their semi-finals and advanced to the gold medal game, while the losing teams advanced to the bronze medal game. The United Arab Emirates won the tournament after defeating Kuwait 3–1 in the gold medal game, winning their second championship title. Oman finished third after defeating Bahrain 5–1 in the bronze medal game.

== Round robin ==
The four participating teams were placed in a single round robin. After playing the round-robin, the number one ranked team is seeded into a semi-final against the fourth ranked team and the second ranked team plays in the second semi-final against the team who finished in third place.

Pos	Team	Pld	W	OTW	OTL	L	GF	GA	GD	Pts
1	United Arab Emirates	3	2	1	0	0	27	3	+24	8
2	Kuwait	3	2	0	1	0	26	5	+21	7
3	Oman	3	1	0	0	2	11	24	−13	3
4	Bahrain	3	0	0	0	3	7	39	−32	0

28 May 2012	Kuwait	13 – 2 (4–0, 4–1, 5–1)	Bahrain	Zayed Sports City

Game reference

28 May 2012	United Arab Emirates	8 – 1 (4–0, 1–1, 3–0)	Oman	Zayed Sports City

Game reference

29 May 2012	Kuwait	11 – 0 (4–0, 2–0, 5–0)	Oman	Zayed Sports City

Game reference

29 May 2012	United Arab Emirates	16 – 0 (6–0, 3–0, 7–0)	Bahrain	Zayed Sports City

Game reference

30 May 2012	Bahrain	5 – 10 (2–2, 3–6, 0–2)	Oman	Zayed Sports City

Game reference

30 May 2012	United Arab Emirates	3 – 2 GWS (0–1, 2–1, 0–0) (OT: 0–0) (SO: 1–0)	Kuwait	Zayed Sports City

Game reference

== Playoff round ==
=== Bracket ===
Semi-finals
31 May
Kuwait	11
Oman	1
31 May
United Arab Emirates	12
Bahrain	0

Finals
1 June
United Arab Emirates	3
Kuwait	1
Third place
1 June
Oman	5
Bahrain	1

=== Semi-finals ===
31 May 2012	Kuwait	11 – 1 (5–1, 5–0, 1–0)	Oman	Zayed Sports City

Game reference

31 May 2012	United Arab Emirates	12 – 0 (4–0, 5–0, 2–0)	Bahrain	Zayed Sports City

Game reference

=== Bronze medal game ===
1 June 2012	Oman	5 – 1	Bahrain	Zayed Sports City

Game reference

=== Gold medal game ===
1 June 2012	United Arab Emirates	3 – 1 (1–0, 1–1, 1–0)	Kuwait	Zayed Sports City

Game reference
