= 2024 Men's Ice Hockey World Championships =

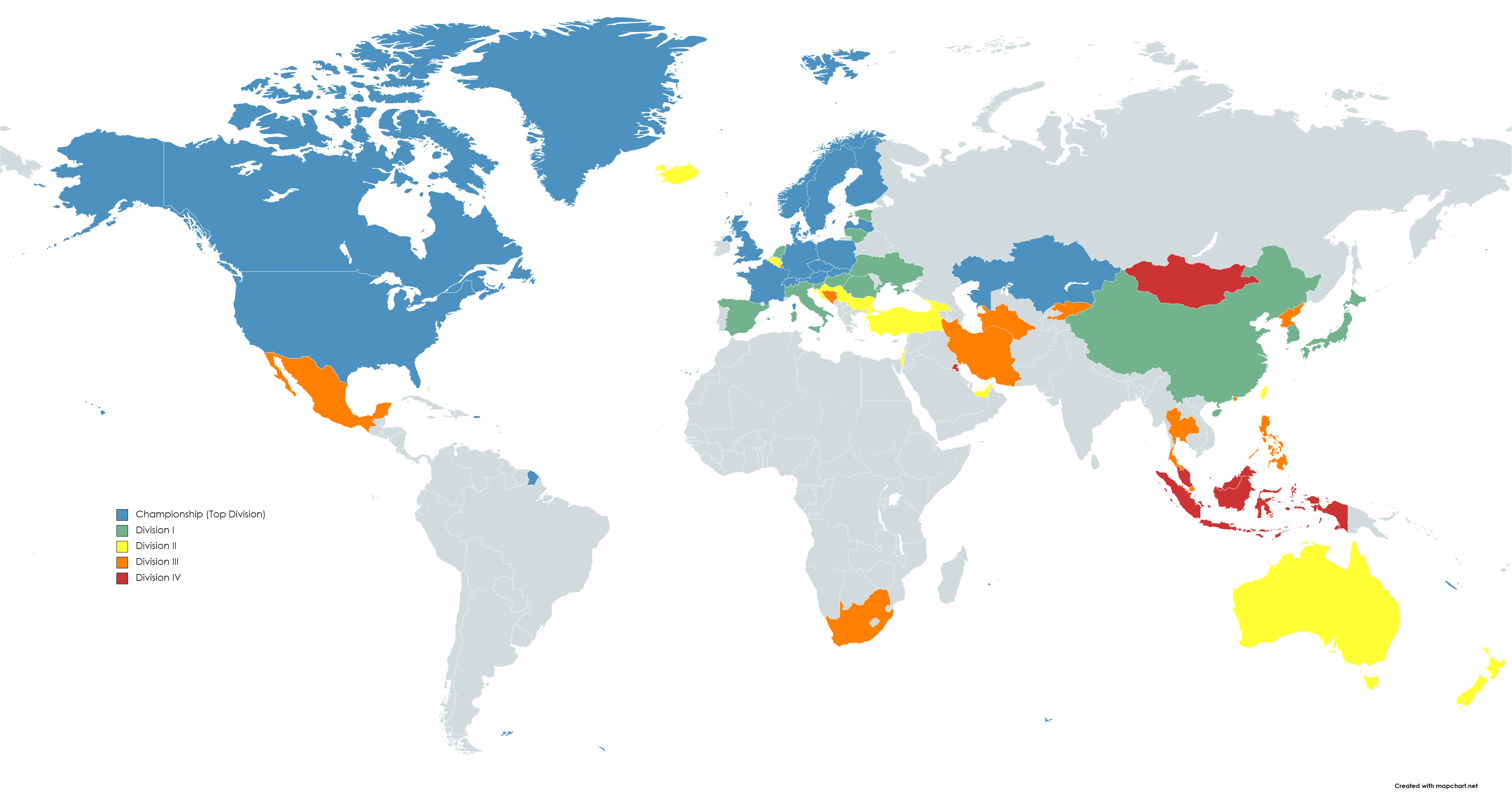
Map of the countries participating at the 2024 IIHF World Championship

The 2024 Men's Ice Hockey World Championships were the 87th such event hosted by the International Ice Hockey Federation. Teams participate at several levels of competition based on their 2023 results. The competition served as qualifications for division placements in the 2025 edition.

Since 2023, teams from Russia and Belarus have not been allowed to enter, as they remain suspended by the IIHF due to the countries' invasion of Ukraine.

== Championship (Top Division) ==
The tournament was held in Prague and Ostrava, Czechia from 10 to 26 May 2024.

=== Group A ===
Pos	Team	Pld	W	OTW	OTL	L	GF	GA	GD	Pts	Qualification or relegation
1	Canada	7	5	2	0	0	32	18	+14	19	Quarterfinals
2	Switzerland	7	5	1	0	1	29	12	+17	17	Quarterfinals
3	Czechia (H)	7	4	1	2	0	26	14	+12	16	Quarterfinals
4	Finland	7	3	0	1	3	21	14	+7	10	Quarterfinals
5	Austria	7	2	0	1	4	21	29	−8	7	Qualification for 2025 IIHF World Championship
6	Norway	7	2	0	0	5	15	25	−10	6 (Note: Denmark 0–2 Norway)	Qualification for 2025 IIHF World Championship
7	Denmark	7	2	0	0	5	15	29	−14	6	Qualification for 2025 IIHF World Championship
8	Great Britain	7	1	0	0	6	12	30	−18	3	Relegation to 2025 Division I A

Source: IIHF
Rules for classification: 1) points; 2) head-to-head points; 3) head-to-head goal difference; 4) head-to-head number of goals scored; 5) result against closest best-ranked team outside tied teams; 6) result against second-best-ranked team outside tied teams; 7) seeding before tournament
(H) Host

=== Group B ===
Pos	Team	Pld	W	OTW	OTL	L	GF	GA	GD	Pts	Qualification or relegation
1	Sweden	7	7	0	0	0	35	9	+26	21	Quarterfinals
2	United States	7	5	0	1	1	37	16	+21	16	Quarterfinals
3	Germany	7	5	0	0	2	34	24	+10	15	Quarterfinals
4	Slovakia	7	3	1	1	2	26	23	+3	12	Quarterfinals
5	Latvia	7	1	3	0	3	19	29	−10	9	Qualification for 2025 IIHF World Championship
6	Kazakhstan	7	2	0	0	5	12	31	−19	6	Qualification for 2025 IIHF World Championship
7	France	7	1	0	1	5	13	26	−13	4	Qualification for 2025 IIHF World Championship
8	Poland	7	0	0	1	6	11	29	−18	1	Relegation to 2025 Division I A

Source: IIHF
Rules for classification: 1) points; 2) head-to-head points; 3) head-to-head goal difference; 4) head-to-head number of goals scored; 5) result against closest best-ranked team outside tied teams; 6) result against second-best-ranked team outside tied teams; 7) seeding before tournament

=== Bracket ===
Quarter-finals
23 May
1A Canada	6
4B Slovakia	3
23 May
1B Sweden (OT)	2
4A Finland	1
23 May
2A Switzerland	3
3B Germany	1
23 May
2B United States	0
3A Czechia	1

Semi-finals
25 May
1 Sweden	3
5 Czechia	7
25 May
2 Canada	2
3 Switzerland (GWS)	3

Final
26 May
5 Czechia	2
3 Switzerland	0
Third place
26 May
1 Sweden	4
2 Canada	2

=== Final standings ===
Teams finishing fifth in the preliminary round were ranked ninth and tenth, teams finishing sixth were ranked 11th and 12th, and so on.

Pos	Grp	Team	Pld	W	OTW	OTL	L	GF	GA	GD	Pts	Final result
1	A	Czechia (H)	10	7	1	2	0	36	17	+19	25	Champions
2	A	Switzerland	10	6	2	0	2	35	17	+18	22	Runners-up
3	B	Sweden	10	8	1	0	1	44	19	+25	26	Third place
4	A	Canada	10	6	2	1	1	42	28	+14	23	Fourth place
5	B	United States	8	5	0	1	2	37	17	+20	16	Eliminated in Quarterfinals
6	B	Germany	8	5	0	0	3	35	27	+8	15	Eliminated in Quarterfinals
7	B	Slovakia	8	3	1	1	3	29	29	0	12	Eliminated in Quarterfinals
8	A	Finland	8	3	0	2	3	22	16	+6	11	Eliminated in Quarterfinals
9	B	Latvia	7	1	3	0	3	19	29	−10	9	Eliminated in Preliminary round
10	A	Austria	7	2	0	1	4	21	29	−8	7	Eliminated in Preliminary round
11	A	Norway	7	2	0	0	5	15	25	−10	6	Eliminated in Preliminary round
12	B	Kazakhstan	7	2	0	0	5	12	31	−19	6	Eliminated in Preliminary round
13	A	Denmark	7	2	0	0	5	15	29	−14	6	Eliminated in Preliminary round
14	B	France	7	1	0	1	5	13	26	−13	4	Eliminated in Preliminary round
15	A	Great Britain	7	1	0	0	6	12	30	−18	3	Relegated to 2025 IIHF World Championship Division I
16	B	Poland	7	0	0	1	6	11	29	−18	1	Relegated to 2025 IIHF World Championship Division I

Source: IIHF
Rules for classification: 1) position in the group; 2) number of points; 3) goal difference; 4) goals scored; 5) seeding before tournament.
(H) Host

== Division I ==
=== Group A ===
The tournament was held in Bolzano, Italy from 28 April to 4 May 2024.

Pos	Team	Pld	W	OTW	OTL	L	GF	GA	GD	Pts	Promotion or relegation
1	Hungary	5	3	1	0	1	15	8	+7	11	Promoted to the 2025 Top Division
2	Slovenia	5	3	0	0	2	14	8	+6	9 (Note: Head-to-head points: Slovenia 6 Pts, Italy 3 Pts, Romania 0 Pts.)	Promoted to the 2025 Top Division
3	Italy (H)	5	2	1	1	1	20	10	+10	9	
4	Romania	5	3	0	0	2	11	17	−6	9	
5	Japan	5	1	0	1	3	11	17	−6	4	
6	South Korea	5	1	0	0	4	12	23	−11	3	Relegated to the 2025 Division I B

Source: IIHF
Rules for classification: 1) points; 2) head-to-head points; 3) head-to-head goal difference; 4) head-to-head number of goals scored; 5) result against closest best-ranked team outside tied teams; 6) result against second-best ranked team outside tied teams; 7) seeding before tournament.
(H) Host

=== Group B ===
The tournament was held in Vilnius, Lithuania from 27 April to 3 May 2024.

Pos	Team	Pld	W	OTW	OTL	L	GF	GA	GD	Pts	Promotion or relegation
1	Ukraine	5	5	0	0	0	31	2	+29	15	Promoted to the 2025 Division I A
2	Lithuania (H)	5	4	0	0	1	16	7	+9	12	
3	Estonia	5	2	1	0	2	11	20	−9	8	
4	China	5	2	0	0	3	11	16	−5	6	
5	Spain	5	1	0	1	3	6	20	−14	4	
6	Netherlands	5	0	0	0	5	4	14	−10	0	Relegated to the 2025 Division II A

Source: IIHF
Rules for classification: 1) points; 2) head-to-head points; 3) head-to-head goal difference; 4) head-to-head number of goals scored; 5) result against closest best-ranked team outside tied teams; 6) result against second-best ranked team outside tied teams; 7) seeding before tournament.
(H) Host

== Division II ==
=== Group A ===
The tournament was held in Belgrade, Serbia from 21 to 27 April 2024.

Pos	Team	Pld	W	OTW	OTL	L	GF	GA	GD	Pts	Promotion or relegation
1	Croatia	5	5	0	0	0	26	6	+20	15	Promoted to the 2025 Division I B
2	Serbia (H)	5	4	0	0	1	23	11	+12	12	
3	United Arab Emirates	5	3	0	0	2	25	21	+4	9	
4	Israel	5	1	1	0	3	17	26	−9	5	
5	Australia	5	1	0	1	3	15	19	−4	4	
6	Iceland	5	0	0	0	5	11	34	−23	0	Relegated to the 2025 Division II B

Source: IIHF
Rules for classification: 1) points; 2) head-to-head points; 3) head-to-head goal difference; 4) head-to-head number of goals scored; 5) result against closest best-ranked team outside tied teams; 6) result against second-best ranked team outside tied teams; 7) seeding before tournament.
(H) Host

=== Group B ===
The tournament was held in Sofia, Bulgaria from 22 to 28 April 2024.

Pos	Team	Pld	W	OTW	OTL	L	GF	GA	GD	Pts	Promotion or relegation
1	Belgium	5	5	0	0	0	37	4	+33	15	Promoted to the 2025 Division II A
2	New Zealand	5	3	0	1	1	22	18	+4	10	
3	Georgia	5	3	0	0	2	20	17	+3	9	
4	Bulgaria (H)	5	1	1	0	3	17	29	−12	5	
5	Chinese Taipei	5	1	0	1	3	14	27	−13	4	
6	Turkey	5	0	1	0	4	10	25	−15	2	Relegated to the 2025 Division III A

Source: IIHF
Rules for classification: 1) points; 2) head-to-head points; 3) head-to-head goal difference; 4) head-to-head number of goals scored; 5) result against closest best-ranked team outside tied teams; 6) result against second-best ranked team outside tied teams; 7) seeding before tournament.
(H) Host

== Division III ==
=== Group A ===
The tournament was played in Bishkek, Kyrgyzstan from 10 to 16 March 2024.

Pos	Team	Pld	W	OTW	OTL	L	GF	GA	GD	Pts	Promotion or relegation
1	Thailand	5	5	0	0	0	38	9	+29	15	Promoted to the 2025 Division II B
2	Kyrgyzstan (H)	5	4	0	0	1	37	22	+15	12	
3	Luxembourg	5	2	1	0	2	17	22	−5	8	
4	Turkmenistan	5	2	0	0	3	23	31	−8	6	
5	South Africa	5	1	0	0	4	13	26	−13	3	
6	Mexico	5	0	0	1	4	15	33	−18	1	Relegated to the 2025 Division III B

Source: IIHF
Rules for classification: 1) points; 2) head-to-head points; 3) head-to-head goal difference; 4) head-to-head number of goals scored; 5) result against closest best-ranked team outside tied teams; 6) result against second-best ranked team outside tied teams; 7) seeding before tournament.
(H) Host

=== Group B ===
The tournament was held in Sarajevo, Bosnia and Herzegovina from 23 to 29 February 2024.

Pos	Team	Pld	W	OTW	OTL	L	GF	GA	GD	Pts	Promotion or relegation
1	Bosnia and Herzegovina (H)	5	4	0	1	0	25	11	+14	13	Promoted to the 2025 Division III A
2	North Korea	5	4	0	0	1	38	22	+16	12	
3	Hong Kong	5	3	1	0	1	40	24	+16	11	
4	Philippines	5	2	0	0	3	30	30	0	6	
5	Singapore	5	1	0	0	4	20	35	−15	3	
6	Iran	5	0	0	0	5	14	45	−31	0	Relegated to the 2025 Division IV

Source: IIHF
Rules for classification: 1) points; 2) head-to-head points; 3) head-to-head goal difference; 4) head-to-head number of goals scored; 5) result against closest best-ranked team outside tied teams; 6) result against second-best ranked team outside tied teams; 7) seeding before tournament.
(H) Host

== Division IV ==
The tournament was held in Kuwait City, Kuwait from 16 to 19 April 2024.

Pos	Team	Pld	W	OTW	OTL	L	GF	GA	GD	Pts	Promotion
1	Mongolia	3	3	0	0	0	28	7	+21	9	Promoted to the 2025 Division III B
2	Kuwait (H)	3	2	0	0	1	25	13	+12	6	
3	Indonesia	3	0	1	0	2	17	23	−6	2	
4	Malaysia	3	0	0	1	2	9	36	−27	1	

Source: IIHF
Rules for classification: 1) points; 2) head-to-head points; 3) head-to-head goal difference; 4) head-to-head number of goals scored; 5) result against closest best-ranked team outside tied teams; 6) result against second-best ranked team outside tied teams; 7) seeding before tournament.
(H) Host
