= 2014 Gulf Ice Hockey Championship =

Tournament details
- Host country: Kuwait
- Venue(s): 1 (in 1 host city)
- Dates: 6 – 12 June
- Teams: 4

Final positions
- Champions: United Arab Emirates (3rd title)

Tournament statistics
- Games played: 10
- Goals scored: 82 (8.2 per game)

The 2014 Gulf Ice Hockey Championship was the third Gulf Ice Hockey Championship. It took place between 6 and 12 June in Kuwait City, Kuwait. The United Arab Emirates won the tournament after defeating Kuwait in the final, claiming their third title. Qatar finished third place after defeating Oman in the third place game.

== Round-robin ==
Four participating teams were placed in a single round-robin. After playing the round-robin, the number one ranked team is seeded into a semi-final against the fourth ranked team and the second ranked team plays in the second semi-final against the third ranked team.

Pos	Team	Pld	W	OTW	OTL	L	GF	GA	GD	Pts
1	United Arab Emirates	3	3	0	0	0	17	4	+13	9
2	Kuwait	3	2	0	0	1	16	7	+9	6
3	Oman	3	1	0	0	2	12	17	−5	3
4	Qatar	3	0	0	0	3	9	26	−17	0

All times local. (UTC+03)

6 June 2014	Qatar	1 – 7	United Arab Emirates	Ice Skating Rink

6 June 2014	Oman	0 – 6	Kuwait	Ice Skating Rink

7 June 2014	United Arab Emirates	8 – 3	Oman	Ice Skating Rink

7 June 2014	Kuwait	10 – 5	Qatar	Ice Skating Rink

9 June 2014	Oman	9 – 3	Qatar	Ice Skating Rink

9 June 2014	Kuwait	0 – 2	United Arab Emirates	Ice Skating Rink

== Playoff round ==
Bracket

Semi-finals
1	United Arab Emirates	6
4	Qatar	2
2	Kuwait	4
3	Oman	2

Final
SF1	United Arab Emirates	5
SF2	Kuwait	0
Third place
SF1	Qatar	7
SF2	Oman	2

=== Semi-finals ===
10 June 2014	United Arab Emirates	6 – 2	Qatar	Ice Skating Rink

10 June 2014	Kuwait	4 – 2	Oman	Ice Skating Rink

=== Third place ===
12 June 2014	Qatar	7 – 2	Oman	Ice Skating Rink

=== Final ===
12 June 2014	United Arab Emirates	5 – 0	Kuwait	Ice Skating Rink

== Final standings ==
Rank	Team
1st place, gold medalist(s)	United Arab Emirates
2nd place, silver medalist(s)	Kuwait
3rd place, bronze medalist(s)	Qatar
4	Oman
