= Qatar Ice Hockey Federation =

Qatar
- Association name: Qatar Winter Sports Committee
- IIHF Code: QAT
- IIHF membership: 18 May 2012
- President: Khalil Al-Jabir

The Qatar Winter Sports Committee (QWSC) (Arabic: لجنة الرياضات الشتوية القطرية) is the governing body of winter sports in Qatar.

== History ==
The federation was founded in 2010, and it was accepted into the International Ice Hockey Federation (IIHF) on 18 May 2012. QWSC is currently a full member of the IIHF. The federation's current president is Khalil Al-Jabir. QWSC is affiliated to the Qatar Olympic Committee.
