= 2016 Gulf Ice Hockey Championship =

Tournament details
- Host country: Qatar
- Dates: 28 January – 2 February 2016
- Teams: 4

Final positions
- Champions: United Arab Emirates (4th title)

Tournament statistics
- Games played: 10
- Goals scored: 89 (8.9 per game)

The 2016 Gulf Ice Hockey Championship was the fourth Gulf Ice Hockey Championship. It took place between 28 January and 2 February 2016 in Doha, Qatar. The United Arab Emirates won the tournament after defeating Qatar in the gold medal game, claiming their fourth title of the championships. Kuwait finished third after defeating Oman in the bronze medal game.

== Overview ==
The 2016 Gulf Ice Hockey Championship was organised by the Qatar Winter Sports Committee and began on 28 January 2016 in Doha, Qatar with the games being played at Villagio’s Ice Court. Kuwait, Oman and the United Arab Emirates all returned for their fourth Gulf Ice Hockey Championship's while hosts Qatar returned to compete in their second appearance of the tournament. The four teams first competed in a round-robin competition, with their ranking determining their seeding in the semi-finals. The United Arab Emirates finished the round-robin in first place after winning all three of their games and were seeded against fourth placed Oman who had failed to win any of their games. Kuwait finished the round-robin in second place after beating both Oman in their opening game and Qatar before losing to the United Arab Emirates in their third game. Hosts Qatar finished in third place after defeating Oman 5–3 in their final round-robin match.

The United Arab Emirates opened the playoff round with a 5–0 shutout against Oman and advanced to the gold medal match against Qatar who had defeated Kuwait 5–3 in their semifinal. The United Arab Emirates won the tournament after defeating Qatar 5–0 in the gold medal match, winning their fourth championship title. Qatar picked up their first silver medal at the championship having previously won bronze in 2014. Kuwait finished third after defeating Oman 5–4 in the bronze medal game.

== Round-robin ==
The four participating teams were placed in a single round robin. After playing the round-robin, the number one ranked team is seeded into a semi-final against the fourth ranked team and the second ranked team plays in the second semi-final against the team who finished in third place.

Pos	Team	Pld	W	OTW	OTL	L	GF	GA	GD	Pts
1	United Arab Emirates	3	3	0	0	0	25	0	+25	9
2	Kuwait	3	2	0	0	1	24	12	+12	6
3	Qatar	3	1	0	0	2	9	20	−11	3
4	Oman	3	0	0	0	3	4	30	−26	0

28 January 2016	Kuwait	17–1	Oman	Villagio’s Ice Court

Game reference

28 January 2016	Qatar	0–10	United Arab Emirates	Villagio’s Ice Court

Game reference

29 January 2016	United Arab Emirates	8–0	Oman	Villagio’s Ice Court

Game reference

29 January 2016	Qatar	4–7	Kuwait	Villagio’s Ice Court

Game reference

30 January 2016	United Arab Emirates	7–0	Kuwait	Villagio’s Ice Court

Game reference

30 January 2016	Qatar	5–3	Oman	Villagio’s Ice Court

Game reference

== Playoff round ==
=== Bracket ===
Semi-finals
1 February
United Arab Emirates	5
Oman	0
1 February
Kuwait	3
Qatar	5

Finals
2 February
United Arab Emirates	5
Qatar	0
Third place
2 February
Oman	4
Kuwait	5

=== Semi-finals ===
1 February 2016	United Arab Emirates	5–0	Oman	Villagio’s Ice Court

Game reference

1 February 2016	Kuwait	3–5	Qatar	Villagio’s Ice Court

Game reference

=== Bronze medal game ===
2 February 2016	Oman	4–5	Kuwait	Villagio’s Ice Court

Game reference

=== Gold medal game ===
2 February 2016	United Arab Emirates	5–0	Qatar	Villagio’s Ice Court

Game reference
