= Gulf Cooperation Council Youth Athletics Championships =

International athletics competition

The Gulf Cooperation Council Youth Athletics Championships is a biennial international athletics competition between youth athletes (under-18) from nations within the Cooperation Council for the Arab States of the Gulf. The competition was first held in 2000 and its events are incorporated into the schedule for the senior level Gulf Cooperation Council Athletics Championships. Like the senior event, the youth competitions are available for male athletes only, reflecting the participating countries' emphasis on track and field as mainly a male preserve.

== Editions ==
Ed.	Year	City	Country	Dates	No. of events	No. of athletes
1st	2000	Kuwait City	Kuwait			
2nd	2002	Katif	Saudi Arabia			
3rd	2003	Kuwait City	Kuwait			
4th	2005	Manama	Bahrain			
5th	2007	?	?			
6th	2009	Qatif	Saudi Arabia			
7th	2011	Isa Town	Bahrain			
8th	2013	Doha	Qatar			

== See also ==
- GCC Champions League, a regional football competition for Gulf states
