= Oman Ice Sports Committee =

Oman
- Association name: Oman Skating Sports Committee
- IIHF Code: OMA
- IIHF membership: 24 May 2014
- President: Said Ali Hassan Al-Zaabi

The Oman Skating Sports Committee (OSSC) (Arabic: اللجنة العمانية لرياضات التزلج) is the governing body of ice hockey in Oman.

== History ==
The OSSC joined the International Ice Hockey Federation (IIHF) as an associate member on 24 May 2014. Oman became the fourth nation from the Persian Gulf region to join the IIHF (United Arab Emirates, Kuwait, and Qatar), and therefore has no right to vote in the General Assembly. The current president of the OSSC is Said Ali Hassan Al-Zaabi.
