= 2010 Gulf Ice Hockey Championship =

Tournament details
- Host country: Kuwait
- Dates: 25 May – 30 May 2010
- Teams: 4

Final positions
- Champions: United Arab Emirates (1st title)

Tournament statistics
- Games played: 6
- Goals scored: 53 (8.83 per game)

The 2010 Gulf Ice Hockey Championship was the first Gulf Ice Hockey Championship. It took place between 25 May and 30 May 2010 in Kuwait City, Kuwait. The United Arab Emirates won the tournament winning all three of their games and finishing first in the standings. Kuwait finished second and Saudi Arabia finished in third place.

== Overview ==
The 2010 Gulf Ice Hockey Championship began on 25 May 2010 in Kuwait City, Kuwait with the games being played at the National Ice Skating Rink. The Oman and Saudi Arabia their made their debut in international competition. The event was organised by the Kuwait Ice Hockey Association and supervised by the International Ice Hockey Federation who also provided referees. The United Arab Emirates won the tournament, winning all three games and finishing first in the standings. Kuwait finished second after losing only to the United Arab Emirates and Saudi Arabia finished in third place.

== Standings ==
Pos	Team	Pld	W	OTW	OTL	L	GF	GA	GD	Pts
1st place, gold medalist(s)	United Arab Emirates	3	3	0	0	0	29	2	+27	9
2nd place, silver medalist(s)	Kuwait	3	2	0	0	1	16	7	+9	6
3rd place, bronze medalist(s)	Saudi Arabia	3	1	0	0	2	7	25	−18	3
4	Oman	3	0	0	0	3	1	19	−18	0

== Fixtures ==
May 25, 2010	Kuwait	10–3 (4–0, 2–1, 4–2)	Saudi Arabia	National Ice Skating Rink

Game reference

May 26, 2010	Oman	0–11 (0–3, 0–4, 0–4)	United Arab Emirates	National Ice Skating Rink

Game reference

May 27, 2010	Kuwait	5–0 (2–0, 2–0, 1–0)	Oman	National Ice Skating Rink

Game reference

May 27, 2010	Saudi Arabia	1–14 (0–5, 1–5, 0–4)	United Arab Emirates	National Ice Skating Rink

Game reference

May 29, 2010	Oman	1–3	Saudi Arabia	National Ice Skating Rink

Game reference

May 30, 2010	Kuwait	1–4	United Arab Emirates	National Ice Skating Rink

Game reference
