= Hextar World at Empire City =

Shopping mall in Petaling, Selangor, Malaysia

Coordinates: 3°10′02.3″N 101°36′53.5″E

- Illuminated indoor European high-street promenade beneath a geometric space-frame glass canopy at Hextar World, featuring colonial-style building facades and the corner entrance of Parkson department store
- Location: Damansara, Selangor, Malaysia

The Hextar World at Empire City, formerly known as Empire City is a shopping mall situated at the Empire City development in Damansara, Selangor, Malaysia.

== Mall ==
Hextar is the main developer of Hextar World at Empire City. It was completed in 2025.

=== Malaysia Nationae Skating Stadium ===
The mall's ice skating rink, is dubbed as the Empire City Ice Arena or the Malaysia National Ice Skating Stadium. The 1,800 sq m, 600-seater (5,000 standing capacity) facility is Olympic-regulated and has full equipment to host major international tournaments.

Ice Business, a Germany-based firm was responsible for the construction of the venue's ice skating rink located on the first sub level of the building it occupies. The ice rink is the first in Malaysia to have a cement flooring and has a capacity to accommodate 500 people.

The ice skating rink was planned to be ready by 1 February 2017. This target was moved to mid-May 2017 and later 19 June 2017, but was finally opened on 18 August 2017. The cost of the construction is believed to be in the region of RM30 million.

The rink was used to host the ice hockey and figure skating events of the 2017 Southeast Asian Games, and then subsequently the International Ice Hockey Federation’s Challenge Cup of Asia 2018. It was then opened for the public in May 2018.
