= 2014 IIHF Challenge Cup of Asia =

Tournament details
- Host country: United Arab Emirates
- Venue: 1 (in 1 host city)
- Dates: 16 – 22 March 2014
- Teams: 6

Final positions
- Champions: Chinese Taipei (4th title)
- Runners-up: United Arab Emirates
- Third place: Mongolia

Tournament statistics
- Games played: 15
- Goals scored: 132 (8.8 per game)

The 2014 IIHF Challenge Cup of Asia was the 7th IIHF Challenge Cup of Asia, an annual international ice hockey tournament held by the International Ice Hockey Federation (IIHF). It took place between 16 and 22 March 2014 in Abu Dhabi, United Arab Emirates.

== Top Division ==
Participants
Team	2013 Results
Chinese Taipei	1st in Group A, won gold medal in 2013
Hong Kong	1st in Group B, won silver medal in 2013
Mongolia	2nd in Group B, won bronze medal in 2013
Kuwait	4th in Group A, lost bronze medal game in 2013
Thailand	2nd in Group A, lost quarter-finals in 2013
United Arab Emirates	Host, 3rd in Group A, lost quarter-finals in 2013

=== Preliminary round ===
Pos	Team	Pld	W	OTW	OTL	L	GF	GA	GD	Pts	Qualification
1st place, gold medalist(s)	Chinese Taipei	5	5	0	0	0	53	8	+45	15	Gold medal
2nd place, silver medalist(s)	United Arab Emirates	5	3	1	0	1	20	12	+8	11	Silver medal
3rd place, bronze medalist(s)	Mongolia	5	3	0	0	2	24	18	+6	9	Bronze medal
4	Thailand	5	1	1	1	2	19	31	−12	6	
5	Hong Kong	5	1	0	1	3	11	23	−12	4	
6	Kuwait	5	0	0	0	5	5	40	−35	0	Relegated to Division I 2015

Source: IIHF

All times local. (UTC+04:00)

16 March 2014; 13:00	Hong Kong	1 – 2 (GWS) (0–0, 1–0, 0–1, 0–0, 0–1)	Thailand	Abu Dhabi Ice Rink

Game reference
Emerson Kwokway Keung; Wai Hang Wesley Yau	Goalies	Pattarapol Ungkulpattanasuk
15	Shots	33

16 March 2014; 16:30	Mongolia	3 – 10 (2–4, 0–2, 1–4)	Chinese Taipei	Abu Dhabi Ice Rink

Game reference
Munkhbold Bayarsaikhan; Ulambayar Narmandakh	Goalies	Pang-Keng Ting; Yu-Cheng Liao
12	Shots	30

16 March 2014; 20:00	United Arab Emirates	5 – 1 (3–0, 0–0, 2–1)	Kuwait	Abu Dhabi Ice Rink

Game reference
Khaled Al Suwaidi; Ahmed Al Dhaheri	Goalies	Jasem Al Sarref; Jasem Dashti
33	Shots	14

17 March 2014; 13:00	Chinese Taipei	16 – 1 (6–0, 6–1, 4–0)	Kuwait	Abu Dhabi Ice Rink

Game reference
Pang-Keng Ting; Yu-Cheng Liao	Goalies	Jasem Al Sarref; Jasem Dashti
52	Shots	12

17 March 2014; 16:30	Hong Kong	2 – 9 (1–4, 1–1, 0–4)	Mongolia	Abu Dhabi Ice Rink

Game reference
Emerson Kwokway Keung; Wai Hang Wesley Yau	Goalies	Munkhbold Bayarsaikhan; Od-Erdene Batnasan
26	Shots	39

17 March 2014; 20:00	Thailand	4 – 5 (OT) (1–3, 0–1, 3–0, 0–1)	United Arab Emirates	Abu Dhabi Ice Rink

Game reference
Pattarapol Ungkulpattanasuk; Prawes Kaewjeen	Goalies	Khaled Al Suwaidi; Ahmed Al Dhaheri
35	Shots	32

19 March 2014; 13:00	Mongolia	3 – 1 (0–0, 1–1, 2–0)	Kuwait	Abu Dhabi Ice Rink

Game reference
Munkhbold Bayarsaikhan; Ulambayar Narmandakh	Goalies	Jasem Al Sarref; Jasem Dashti
19	Shots	13

19 March 2014; 16:30	Chinese Taipei	15 – 1 (3–0, 7–1, 5–0)	Thailand	Abu Dhabi Ice Rink

Game reference
Pang-Keng Ting; Yu-Cheng Liao	Goalies	Pattarapol Ungkulpattanasuk; Prawes Kaewjeen
52	Shots	35

19 March 2014; 20:00	Hong Kong	1 – 5 (0–0, 1–2, 0–3)	United Arab Emirates	Abu Dhabi Ice Rink

Game reference
Emerson Kwokway Keung; Wai Hang Wesley Yau	Goalies	Khaled Al Suwaidi; Ahmed Al Dhaheri
21	Shots	36

20 March 2014; 13:00	Thailand	2 – 8 (1–2, 1–3, 0–3)	Mongolia	Abu Dhabi Ice Rink

Game reference
Pattarapol Ungkulpattanasuk; Prawes Kaewjeen	Goalies	Munkhbold Bayarsaikhan; Od-Erdene Batnasan
25	Shots	33

20 March 2014; 16:30	Kuwait	0 – 6 (0–3, 0–2, 0–1)	Hong Kong	Abu Dhabi Ice Rink

Game reference
Jasem Al Sarref; Jasem Dashti	Goalies	Emerson Kwokway Keung; Wai Hang Wesley Yau
21	Shots	34

20 March 2014; 20:00	United Arab Emirates	2 – 5 (1–0, 0–2, 1–3)	Chinese Taipei	Abu Dhabi Ice Rink

Game reference
Khaled Al Suwaidi; Ahmed Al Dhaheri	Goalies	Pang-Keng Ting; Yu-Cheng Liao
18	Shots	53

22 March 2014; 13:00	Chinese Taipei	7 – 1 (3–1, 2–0, 2–0)	Hong Kong	Abu Dhabi Ice Rink

Game reference
Pang-Keng Ting; Yu-Cheng Liao	Goalies	Emerson Kwokway Keung; Wai Hang Wesley Yau
59	Shots	14

22 March 2014; 16:30	Kuwait	2 – 10 (1–6, 1–2, 0–2)	Thailand	Abu Dhabi Ice Rink

Game reference
Jasem Al Sarref; Jasem Dashti	Goalies	Pattarapol Ungkulpattanasuk; Prawes Kaewjeen
16	Shots	44

22 March 2014; 20:00	United Arab Emirates	3 – 1 (1–0, 0–1, 2–0)	Mongolia	Abu Dhabi Ice Rink

Game reference
Khaled Al Suwaidi; Ahmed Al Dhaheri	Goalies	Munkhbold Bayarsaikhan; Ulambayar Narmandakh
40	Shots	21

== Division I ==
The Division I competition was played between 24 February and 2 March 2014 in Bishkek, Kyrgyzstan.

Participants
Team	2013 Results
Macau	3rd in Group B, lost quarter-finals in 2013
Singapore	4th in Group B, did not advance in 2013
India	5th in Group B, did not advance in 2013
Kyrgyzstan	Host, did not participate in 2013

=== Standings ===
Rk	Team	Result
1st place, gold medalist(s)	Macau	Promoted to Top Division 2015
2nd place, silver medalist(s)	Kyrgyzstan	
3rd place, bronze medalist(s)	Singapore	
4	India	
