= Kuwait Ice Hockey Association =

Kuwait
- Association name: Kuwait Ice Hockey Association
- IIHF Code: KUW
- IIHF membership: 8 May 2009
- President: Faheed Hamas Al-Ajmi
- IIHF men's ranking: 50
- IIHF women's ranking: N/A

The Kuwait Ice Hockey Association (Arabic: الاتحاد الكويتي لهوكي الجليد) is the governing body of ice hockey in Kuwait. Kuwait had originally joined the International Ice Hockey Federation (IIHF) in 1985, but was expelled in 1992 due to a lack of ice hockey activity. Kuwait was re-admitted into the IIHF on 8 May 2009.

== National teams ==
- Men's national team
- Men's U20 national team
- Women's national team

=== Participation by year ===
2023

Event	Division	Host nation	Date	Result
Men	Div. IV	Mongolia	23–26 March 2023	3rd place (54th overall)
Women AOC		Thailand	30 April–7 May 2023	8th place
Arab Cup		Kuwait	7–13 May 2023	2nd place
