= UAE Winter Sports Federation =

United Arab Emirates
- Association name: UAE Winter Sports Federation
- IIHF Code: UAE
- IIHF membership: May 10, 2001

The UAE Winter Sports Federation (WSFUAE) administers ice hockey activities in United Arab Emirates. It recruits and trains nationals for sporting programs.
