= GCC Games =

Regional multi-sport event

- Abbreviation: GCC
- Frequency: Every 4
- Inaugurated: 2011
- Organization: Gulf Cooperation Council

The GCC Games is a regional multi-sport event which involves participants from the Gulf Cooperation Council region. The GCC Games, a quadrennial multi-sport event, was established by the union and first held in 2011. There are numerous long-running GCC Championships for individual sports, including: the Gulf Cooperation Council Athletics Championships (first held in 1986; youth section from 2000) football, Archery, athletics, Badminton, sailing, basketball, Swimming, Marathon Swimming, Diving, Water Polo, Artistic Swimming, tennis, gymnastics (senior and youth levels), weightlifting, futsal, snooker, Cycling (BMX Freestyle, BMX Racing, Road Cycling, Track Cycling), Chess and table tennis. The 3rd edition of the game had to be organized in June 2019, but held in 2022 due to the internal issues between the GCC state countries. The 4th edition has been announced and will happen as per the announced dates. For the first time the games will be organized by the new, young and talented faces of GCC team.

== GCC Games ==
#	Year	Host city	Country	Sports	Competitors	Dates
1	2011	Manama	Bahrain			11–22 October
2	2015	Dammam	Saudi Arabia			12–26 October
3	2022	Kuwait City	Kuwait			16–21 June
4	2026	Doha	Qatar			11–22 May
5	2028	Muscat	Oman			

== GCC Beach Games ==
- Main Article : GCC Beach Games

#	Year	Host city	Country	Sports	Competitors	Dates
1	2010	Manama	Bahrain			10–17 October
2	2015	Doha	Qatar			2–9 April
3	2025	Muscat	Oman			5–11 April

=== 2025 ===
2025 Games Sports: 8 sports - 300 athletes - 6 Persian Gulf countries: Qatar, Saudi Arabia, Kuwait, Oman, the UAE, and Bahrain.

1. Beach Soccer 1 Events 75 Athletes
2. Beach Athletics 12 Events 69 Athletes
3. Sailing 9 Events 54 Athletes
4. Beach Handball 1 Events 50 Athletes
5. Tent Pegging 8 Events 30 Athletes
6. Beach Volleyball 1 Events 29 Athletes
7. Paramotor 3 Events 16 Athletes
8. Marathon Swimming 4 Events 15 Athletes

beach soccer, beach handball, beach volleyball, athletics, sailing, open water swimming, air sports (paragliding), and equestrian (tent-picking).

Results: https://gccbeach3.om/

3rd GCC Beach Games 05 - 11 April

335 Athletes - 39 Events (49 Planned but 10 events reduced)

https://sharjah24.ae/en/Articles/2025/04/12/UAE-wins-23-medals-takes-second-at-GCC-Beach-Games-2025

https://www.thearabianstories.com/2025/04/12/oman-tops-medal-table-as-3rd-gulf-beach-games-conclude-in-muscat/

https://www.ihf.info/media-center/news/oman-men-win-beach-handball-gold-2025-gulf-beach-games - Beach Handball

==== Medals 2025 ====
Rank	Nation	Gold	Silver	Bronze	Total
1	Oman (OMA)	20	18	7	45
2	United Arab Emirates (UAE)	8	8	6	22
3	Saudi Arabia (KSA)	4	6	8	18
4	Bahrain (BHR)	4	4	9	17
5	Qatar (QAT)	3	1	3	7
6	Kuwait (KUW)	0	2	6	8
Totals (6 entries)		39	39	39	117

=== Results 2025 ===
==== Beach Athletics ====
1. 60m M: Oman/Oman/Saudi Arabia
2. 60m W: Bahrain/Oman/Bahrain
3. High Jump M: Oman/Qatar/Kuwait
4. High Jump W: Oman/Oman/Saudi Arabia
5. Long Jump M: Oman/Oman/Kuwait
6. Long Jump W: Oman/Oman/Saudi Arabia
7. Triple Jump M: Oman/Oman/Saudi Arabia
8. Triple Jump W: Oman/Oman/United Arab Emirates
9. 1600m M: Bahrain/Oman/Bahrain
10. 1600m W: Bahrain/Bahrain/United Arab Emirates
11. Relay 4x60m M: Oman/United Arab Emirates/Saudi Arabia
12. Relay 4x60m W: Oman/United Arab Emirates/Bahrain

==== Marathon Swimming ====
Only Men:

1. 10Km Ind : Saudi Arabia/Oman/Oman
2. 10Km Team : Oman/Saudi Arabia/Bahrain
3. 5Km Ind : Saudi Arabia/Oman/Oman
4. 5Km Team : Oman/Saudi Arabia/Bahrain

==== Paramotor ====
1. Precision Takeoff & Landing: United Arab Emirates/Oman/Oman
2. Bowling Landing: United Arab Emirates/Oman/Oman
3. Paramotor Team: Oman/United Arab Emirates/Kuwait

==== Sailing ====
1. Team Racing Optimist: United Arab Emirates/Oman/Kuwait
2. Girls ILCA-4: United Arab Emirates/United Arab Emirates/Bahrain
3. Men's ILCA-7 : Oman/United Arab Emirates/Bahrain
4. Boys ILCA-4: Oman/United Arab Emirates/Bahrain
5. Boys ILCA-6: United Arab Emirates/Bahrain/Oman
6. Girls ILCA-6: United Arab Emirates/Kuwait/United Arab Emirates
7. Optimist (junior): United Arab Emirates/Oman/Qatar
8. Optimist (girl): Oman/Bahrain/United Arab Emirates
9. Optimist Overall : United Arab Emirates/Oman/Oman

==== Tent Pegging ====
Only Men:

1. Individual Lance: Qatar/Saudi Arabia/Oman
2. Pair Lance: Saudi Arabia/Oman/United Arab Emirates
3. Individual Sword: Oman/Kuwait/Saudi Arabia
4. Pair Sword: Bahrain/Saudi Arabia/Kuwait
5. Individual Rings & Lemons: Qatar/Oman/Qatar
6. Team Rings & Lemons: Oman/Saudi Arabia/Qatar
7. Individual Total: Oman/Saudi Arabia/Saudi Arabia
8. Team Total: Saudi Arabia/Oman/Kuwait

==== Beach Soccer ====
- Oman/United Arab Emirates/Saudi Arabia

Ended Games Status Date & Time Teams Score Ended Apr 11, 202509:30

Team OmanTeam Oman VS Team Saudi ArabiaTeam Saudi Arabia

7 - 2 Ended Apr 11, 202508:00

Team UAETeam UAE VS Team KuwaitTeam Kuwait

5 - 1 Ended Apr 10, 202509:30

Team BahrainTeam Bahrain VS Team KuwaitTeam Kuwait

3 - 2 Ended Apr 10, 202508:00

Team OmanTeam Oman VS Team UAETeam UAE

1 - 0 Ended Apr 9, 202509:30

Team Saudi ArabiaTeam Saudi Arabia VS Team KuwaitTeam Kuwait

5 - 3 Ended Apr 9, 202508:00

Team BahrainTeam Bahrain VS Team UAETeam UAE

0 - 3 Ended Apr 8, 202509:30

Team Saudi ArabiaTeam Saudi Arabia VS Team BahrainTeam Bahrain

2 - 1 Ended Apr 8, 202508:00

Team KuwaitTeam Kuwait VS Team OmanTeam Oman

0 - 3 Ended Apr 7, 202509:30

Team BahrainTeam Bahrain VS Team OmanTeam Oman

1 - 5 Ended Apr 7, 202508:00

Team UAETeam UAE VS Team Saudi ArabiaTeam Saudi Arabia

4 - 1

==== Beach Handball ====
- Oman/Bahrain/United Arab Emirates

nded Games Status Date & Time Teams Score Ended Apr 11, 202500:15

Team OmanTeam Oman VS Team Saudi ArabiaTeam Saudi Arabia

2 - 0 Ended Apr 10, 202522:26

Team UAETeam UAE VS Team BahrainTeam Bahrain

0 - 2 Ended Apr 10, 202508:29

Team OmanTeam Oman VS Team BahrainTeam Bahrain

2 - 0 Ended Apr 10, 202506:26

Team Saudi ArabiaTeam Saudi Arabia VS Team UAETeam UAE

0 - 2 Ended Apr 9, 202507:31

Team BahrainTeam Bahrain VS Team Saudi ArabiaTeam Saudi Arabia

2 - 0 Ended Apr 9, 202507:00

Team UAETeam UAE VS Team OmanTeam Oman

0 - 2 Ended Apr 7, 202506:40

Team OmanTeam Oman VS Team Saudi ArabiaTeam Saudi Arabia

2 - 0 Ended Apr 7, 202506:31

Team BahrainTeam Bahrain VS Team UAETeam UAE

1 - 2 Ended Apr 6, 202507:31

Team BahrainTeam Bahrain VS Team OmanTeam Oman

0 - 2 Ended Apr 6, 202506:40

Team UAETeam UAE VS Team Saudi ArabiaTeam Saudi Arabia

2 - 1 Ended Apr 5, 202501:10

Team Saudi ArabiaTeam Saudi Arabia VS Team BahrainTeam Bahrain

1 - 2 Ended Apr 4, 202523:17

Team UAETeam UAE VS Team OmanTeam Oman

0 - 2

==== Beach Volleyball ====
- Qatar/Oman/Bahrain

Ended Games Status Date & Time Teams Score Ended Apr 10, 202505:30

Team QatarTeam Qatar Team 1 VS Team OmanTeam Oman Team 2

2 - 0 Ended Apr 10, 202504:30

Team OmanTeam Oman Team 1 VS Team BahrainTeam Bahrain Team 2

0 - 2 Ended Apr 9, 202522:00

Team KuwaitTeam Kuwait Team 2 VS Team UAETeam UAE Team 1

1 - 2 Ended Apr 9, 202522:00

Team BahrainTeam Bahrain Team 1 VS Team OmanTeam Oman Team 4

2 - 0 Ended Apr 9, 202506:15

Team OmanTeam Oman Team 2 VS Team BahrainTeam Bahrain Team 2

2 - 0 Ended Apr 9, 202505:30

Team QatarTeam Qatar Team 1 VS Team OmanTeam Oman Team 1

2 - 0 Ended Apr 8, 202523:20

Team UAETeam UAE Team 1 VS Team OmanTeam Oman Team 4

0 - 2 Ended Apr 8, 202523:20

Team KuwaitTeam Kuwait Team 2 VS Team BahrainTeam Bahrain Team 1

0 - 2 Ended Apr 8, 202522:40

Team OmanTeam Oman Team 2 VS Team OmanTeam Oman Team 3

2 - 0 Ended Apr 8, 202522:40

Team BahrainTeam Bahrain Team 2 VS Team KuwaitTeam Kuwait Team 1

2 - 0 Ended Apr 8, 202522:00

Team OmanTeam Oman Team 1 VS Team Saudi ArabiaTeam Saudi Arabia Team 1

2 - 0 Ended Apr 8, 202522:00

Team QatarTeam Qatar Team 1 VS Team Saudi ArabiaTeam Saudi Arabia Team 2

2 - 0 Ended Apr 8, 202505:50

Team BahrainTeam Bahrain Team 2 VS Team OmanTeam Oman Team 4

2 - 0 Ended Apr 8, 202505:10

Team OmanTeam Oman Team 2 VS Team Saudi ArabiaTeam Saudi Arabia Team 2

2 - 0 Ended Apr 8, 202505:10

Team QatarTeam Qatar Team 2 VS Team Saudi ArabiaTeam Saudi Arabia Team 1

0 - 2 Ended Apr 8, 202504:30

Team OmanTeam Oman Team 1 VS Team KuwaitTeam Kuwait Team 1

2 - 0 Ended Apr 8, 202504:30

Team QatarTeam Qatar Team 1 VS Team KuwaitTeam Kuwait Team 2

2 - 0 Ended Apr 7, 202505:50

Team OmanTeam Oman Team 4 VS Team Saudi ArabiaTeam Saudi Arabia Team 1

0 - 2 Ended Apr 7, 202505:10

Team OmanTeam Oman Team 2 VS Team BahrainTeam Bahrain Team 1

2 - 0 Ended Apr 7, 202505:10

Team QatarTeam Qatar Team 2 VS Team BahrainTeam Bahrain Team 2

0 - 2 Ended Apr 7, 202504:30

Team OmanTeam Oman Team 1 VS Team UAETeam UAE Team 1

2 - 0 Ended Apr 7, 202504:30

Team QatarTeam Qatar Team 1 VS Team OmanTeam Oman Team 3

2 - 0 Ended Apr 6, 202523:20

Team Saudi ArabiaTeam Saudi Arabia Team 1 VS Team BahrainTeam Bahrain Team 2

0 - 2 Ended Apr 6, 202522:40

Team Saudi ArabiaTeam Saudi Arabia Team 2 VS Team BahrainTeam Bahrain Team 1

2 - 0 Ended Apr 6, 202522:40

Team QatarTeam Qatar Team 2 VS Team OmanTeam Oman Team 4

0 - 2 Ended Apr 6, 202522:00

Team KuwaitTeam Kuwait Team 2 VS Team OmanTeam Oman Team 3

0 - 2 Ended Apr 6, 202522:00

Team KuwaitTeam Kuwait Team 1 VS Team UAETeam UAE Team 1

2 - 1

== GCC Women’s Games ==
- Main Article : GCC Women’s Games

6th was held in 2019. Bahrain finished with 77 medals, UAE (54), Kuwait (50) Qatar (32), KSA (11) and Oman.

Edition	Year	Host city	Country	Sports	Competitors	Dates
1	2008	Kuwait City	Kuwait	6		
2	2011	Abu Dhabi	United Arab Emirates	6		March
3	2013	Manama	Bahrain	8		3-13 March
4	2015	Muscat	Oman			
5	2017	Doha	Qatar			7-17 March
6	2019	Kuwait City	Kuwait	11	600	
7	2026	Doha	Qatar			2026

== GCC Youth Games ==
- Main Article : GCC Youth Games

Edition	Year	Host city	Country	Sports	Competitors	Dates
1	2024	Dubai	United Arab Emirates	17	1391	16 April to 2 May 2024

held in Bahrain in 2010.

- 1- 2010 Bahrain
- 2- 2015 Qatar

https://uae2024.ae/

Results 2024:

UAE 286 medals, including 93 gold, 100 silver, and 93 bronze. Saudi Arabia secured second place with 136 medals, followed by Kuwait with 116 medals, Qatar with 72, Bahrain with 71, and Oman with 58.

Rank	Nation	Gold	Silver	Bronze	Total
1	United Arab Emirates (UAE)	87	91	88	266
2	Saudi Arabia (KSA)	52	57	34	143
3	Kuwait (KUW)	35	45	46	126
4	Qatar (QAT)	29	22	28	79
5	Bahrain (BHR)	21	15	31	67
6	Oman (OMA)	18	13	26	57
Totals (6 entries)		242	243	253	738

Para

Rank	Nation	Gold	Silver	Bronze	Total
1	United Arab Emirates (UAE)	9	12	9	30
2	Saudi Arabia (KSA)	6	0	0	6
3	Bahrain (BHR)	4	5	1	10
4	Oman (OMA)	3	1	2	6
5	Qatar (QAT)	2	0	0	2
Totals (5 entries)		24	18	12	54

https://uae2024.ae/Home/Games

=== 24 Sports (23 + Para Sports) ===
Games Sports Programme
- Swimming
- Archery
- Athletics
- Badminton
- 3-on-3 basketball
- Billiard
- Boxing
- Chess
- Cycling
- Equestrian
- Esports
- Fencing
- Football
- Handball
- Ju-jitsu
- Judo
- Karate
- Rowing
- Sailing
- Triathlon
- Table tennis
- Taekwondo
- Volleyball

== West Asian Para Games ==
- Main Article : West Asian Para Games

https://asianparalympic.org/sub-regional-games/

https://www.paralympic.org/news/asian-para-games-spots-line-west-asia-championships

Edition	Year	Host	Dates	Sports
1	2017	United Arab Emirates, Khor Fakkan	Feb 18–24	5
2	2019	Jordan, Amman		
3	2022	Bahrain, Manama		
4	2024	United Arab Emirates, Sharjah		

2017 Sports : Football, Basketball, Table Tennis, Powerlifting, Athletics.

The second West Asian Para Games is taking place in Amman between the 15 – 22 September. Six countries will compete in the wheelchair basketball competition, Iraq, Bahrain, Kuwait, United Arab Emirates, Oman and Jordan. The teams will be split across two pools and will play a round robin followed by knockout phase.

3rd West Asia Para Games which takes place in Bahrain between 20 – 25 February.

4th West Asian Para Games will take place in Sharjah, UAE between 27 January – 3 February 2024.

=== 2017 Medal table ===
Rank	Nations	Gold	Sliver	Bronze	Total
1	Iraq	20	20	7	47
2	United Arab Emirates	19	19	21	59
3	Saudi Arabia	14	5	8	27
4	Kuwait	8	8	6	22
5	Jordan	6	5	5	16
6	Oman	5	6	4	15
7	Bahrain	5	3	7	15
8	Qatar	5	1	2	8
9	Lebanon	2	5	5	12
10	Syria	2	1	1	4
11	Palestine	0	2	5	7
12	Yemen	0	1	0	1
Total		86	76	71	233

- "ختام أعمال إجتماع المكتب التنفيذي للإتحاد البارالمبي لمنطقة غرب آسيا رقم (١) لسنة 2017 – الموقع الرسمي للإتحاد البارالمبي لمنطقة غرب آسيا :: West Asia Para Federation". westasia-para.org.
- "LaIVE - 1. West Asian Para Games - Khorfakkan 2017 21.02.2017-23.02.2017". team-thomas.org.
- "دورة ألعاب غرب آسيا البارالمبية الأولى خورفكان 2017 الترتيب النهائي للدول المشاركة" [First West Asian Paralympic Games Khorfakkan 2017: Final ranking of participating countrie] (in Arabic). Archived from the original on 2018-11-11.
- "1st West Asia Para Games - Khorfakkan 2017 - Calendar - IBSA". Archived from the original on 2016-07-22.

== See also ==
- GCC Women's Games
- GCC Beach Games
- GCC Youth Games
- Pan Arab Games
- Pan Arab University Games
- Pan Arab Schools Games
- African Games
- African Beach Games
- Asian Games
- West Asian Para Games
- Arab Women Sports Tournament (AWST) - 5th was held in 2020.
- Gulf Cooperation Council Athletics Championships
- Gulf Cooperation Council Youth Athletics Championships
- Arab Athletics Championships
- GCC Golden Boot
- GSC Game World
- GCA Games Convention Asia
