= 2022 GCC Games =

III Gulf Cooperation Council Games
- Host city: Kuwait City, Kuwait
- Nations: 6
- Athletes: 1500
- Events: 16 sports
- Opening: 16 May
- Closing: 31 May
- Opened by: HH Sheikh Nawaf Al-Ahmad Al-Jaber Al-Sabah
- Website: kuwait2022.org

The 2022 GCC Games was the third edition of multi-sport event for the Gulf Cooperation Council (GCC) countries. It was held in Kuwait, from 16 to 31 May 2022. A total of more than 1,500 athletes and 500 officials participated in 16 sports. Female athletes competed for the first time at the GCC Games in this edition. The six sports involving female athletes are athletics, basketball (3×3), cycling, futsal, esports, and padel.

== Background ==
The Games were originally scheduled to take place from 3 to 14 April 2020, but due to the COVID-19 pandemic, on 3 March 2020, the event was postponed. It was then postponed multiple times due to the COVID-19 pandemic.

== Sports ==
16 sports were contested in this edition of GCC Games.

- Athletics (43)
- Basketball
  - Basketball (1)
  - 3x3 basketball (2)
- Cycling (6)
- Esports (3)
- Fencing (6)
- Futsal (2)
- Handball (1)
- Ice Hockey (1)
- Judo (8)
- Karate (8)
- Padel (4)
- Shooting (10)
- Swimming (20)
- Tennis (3)
- Table tennis (6)
- Volleyball (2)

== Medal standings ==
* Host nation (Kuwait)

Rank	Nation	Gold	Silver	Bronze	Total
1	Kuwait (KUW)*	35	28	31	94
2	Bahrain (BHR)	20	22	21	63
3	United Arab Emirates (UAE)	18	16	16	50
4	Saudi Arabia (KSA)	16	22	28	66
5	Qatar (QAT)	15	20	15	50
6	Oman (OMA)	12	5	16	33
Totals (6 entries)		116	113	127	356
