= 2008 IIHF Challenge Cup of Asia =

Tournament details
- Host country: Hong Kong
- Venue: MegaIce (in 1 host city)
- Dates: April 24 – April 26
- Teams: 6

Final positions
- Champions: Chinese Taipei (1st title)
- Runners-up: Malaysia
- Third place: Hong Kong

Tournament statistics
- Games played: 15

The 2008 IIHF Challenge Cup of Asia took place in Hong Kong, China from 24 April to 26 April. It was the first annual event, and was run by the International Ice Hockey Federation (IIHF). Chinese Taipei won the championship, winning four out of their five games.

== Standings ==
Pos	Team	Pld	W	D	L	GF	GA	GD	Pts
1st place, gold medalist(s)	Chinese Taipei	5	4	0	1	20	6	+14	12
2nd place, silver medalist(s)	Malaysia	5	3	1	1	14	10	+4	10
3rd place, bronze medalist(s)	Hong Kong	5	3	0	2	13	11	+2	9
4	Thailand	5	2	1	2	10	10	0	7
5	Singapore	5	2	0	3	7	5	+2	6
6	Macau	5	0	0	5	4	26	−22	0

== Fixtures ==
All times local.

April 24, 2008	Thailand	1 – 3 (0–3, 1–0)	Chinese Taipei

Game reference

April 24, 2008	Singapore	4 – 0 (1–0, 3–0)	Macau

April 24, 2008	Hong Kong	2 – 4 (0–1, 2–3)	Malaysia

April 24, 2008	Macau	2 – 3 (0–0, 2–3)	Thailand

April 24, 2008	Malaysia	2 – 1 (1–0, 1–1)	Singapore

April 24, 2008	Hong Kong	2 – 1 (1–0, 1–1)	Chinese Taipei

Game reference

April 25, 2008	Chinese Taipei	2 – 1 (1–1, 1–0)	Singapore

Game reference

April 25, 2008	Macau	2 – 6 (1–5, 1–1)	Hong Kong

April 25, 2008	Thailand	2 – 2 (0–1, 2–1)	Malaysia

April 25, 2008	Macau	0 – 9 (0–1, 0–8)	Chinese Taipei

Game reference

April 25, 2008	Thailand	0 – 1 (0–0, 0–1)	Singapore

April 26, 2008	Chinese Taipei	5 – 2 (2–0, 3–2)	Malaysia

Game reference

April 26, 2008	Hong Kong	2 – 4 (2–2, 0–2)	Thailand

April 26, 2008	Malaysia	4 – 0 (0–0, 4–0)	Macau

April 26, 2008	Singapore	0 – 1 (0–0, 0–1)	Hong Kong
