= 2025 in ice hockey =

The following is a list of the events that took place in ice hockey for the year 2025 throughout the world.

== Olympic qualification ==
Final qualifications for women's tournament at the 2026 Winter Olympics took place from February 6 to February 9.

- Group G: Tomakomai
  - Final Round Robin placements: 1. Japan, 2. France, 3. China, 4. Poland
- Group H: Gävle
  - Final Round Robin placements: 1. Sweden, 2. Denmark, 3. Norway, 4. Netherlands
- Group I: Bremerhaven
  - Final Round Robin placements: 1. Germany, 2. Hungary, 3. Austria, 4. Slovakia
- Japan, Sweden, and Germany qualified for the women's tournament at the Olympics.
- Following the International Olympic Committee and International Ice Hockey Federation's decision to extend Russia's tournament ban, France additionally qualified.

== World Championships ==
2025 World Ice Hockey Divisions for the International Ice Hockey Federation (IIHF) will take place between December 9, 2024 and May 25, 2025.

=== World Junior Ice Hockey Championships ===
- December 26, 2024 – January 5: 2025 IIHF World Junior Championship in (Canada) Ottawa
  - The United States defeated Finland, 4–3 in overtime, to win their second consecutive and seventh overall World Junior Ice Hockey Championship title.
  - Czechia defeated Sweden, 3–2 in a shootout, to win the bronze medal.
  - Kazakhstan was relegated to Division I – Group A for 2026.

==== Divisions ====
- December 9 – 15, 2024: Division I – Group A in Bled
  - Final Round Robin placements: 1. Denmark, 2. Austria, 3. Norway, 4. Slovenia, 5. France, 6. Hungary
  - Denmark was promoted to the Top Division for 2026.
  - Hungary was relegated to Division I – Group B for 2026.
- December 11 – 14, 2024: Division III – Group B in Bangkok
  - Final Round Robin placements: 1. Thailand, 2. Kyrgyzstan, 3. South Africa, 4. Luxembourg
  - Thailand was promoted to Division III – Group A for 2026.
- January 6 – 12: Division II – Group A in Zagreb
  - Final Round Robin placements: 1. Lithuania, 2. Romania, 3. Croatia, 4. Great Britain, 5. China, 6. Netherlands
  - Lithuania was promoted to Division I – Group B for 2026.
  - Netherlands was relegated to Division II – Group B for 2026.
- January 11 – 17: Division I – Group B in Tallinn
  - Final Round Robin placements: 1. Ukraine, 2. Japan, 3. Italy, 4. Estonia, 5. Poland, 6. South Korea
  - Ukraine was promoted to Division I – Group A for 2026.
  - South Korea was relegated to Division II – Group A for 2026.
- January 19 – 25: Division II – Group B in Belgrade
  - Final Round Robin placements: 1. Spain, 2. Israel, 3. Serbia, 4. Australia, 5. Iceland, 6. Belgium
  - Spain was promoted to Division II – Group A for 2026.
  - Belgium was relegated to Division III – Group A for 2026.
- January 27 – February 2: Division III – Group A in Istanbul
  - Final Round Robin placements: 1. New Zealand, 2. Chinese Taipei, 3. Bulgaria, 4. Turkey, 5. Bosnia and Herzegovina, 6. Mexico
  - New Zealand was promoted to Division II – Group B for 2026.
  - Mexico was relegated to Division III – Group B for 2026.

=== IIHF World Women's U18 Championship ===
- January 4 – 12: 2025 IIHF World Women's U18 Championship in (Finland) Vantaa
  - Canada defeated United States, 3–0, to win their eighth World Women's U18 Championship title.
  - Czechia defeated Sweden, 2–1, to win the bronze medal.
  - Japan was relegated to Division I – Group A for 2026.

==== Divisions ====
- January 5 – 11: Division I – Group A in Budapest
  - Final Round Robin placements: 1. Hungary, 2. Italy, 3. Germany, 4. Norway, 5. France, 6. Austria
  - Hungary was promoted to the Top Division for 2026.
  - Austria was relegated to Division I – Group B for 2026.
- January 7 – 13: Division I – Group B in Katowice
  - Final Round Robin placements: 1. Denmark, 2. Poland, 3. Spain, 4. China, 5. Australia, 6. South Korea
  - Denmark was promoted to Division I – Group A for 2026.
  - South Korea was relegated to Division II – Group A for 2026.
- January 18 – 23: Division II – Group B in Istanbul
  - Final Round Robin placements: 1. Turkey, 2. Iceland, 3. Belgium, 4. Mexico, 5. South Africa
  - Turkey was promoted to Division II – Group A for 2026.
  - South Africa was relegated to Division III for 2026.
- January 20 – 26: Division II – Group A in Riga
  - Final Round Robin placements: 1. Great Britain, 2. Kazakhstan, 3. Latvia, 4. Netherlands, 5. New Zealand, 6. Chinese Taipei
  - Great Britain was promoted to Division I – Group B for 2026.
  - Chinese Taipei was relegated to Division II – Group B for 2026.
- January 23 – 26: Division III in Zagreb
  - Final Round Robin placements: 1. Romania, 2. Thailand, 3. Croatia, 4. Lithuania
  - Romania was promoted to Division II – Group B for 2026.

=== IIHF Women's World Championship ===
- April 9 – 20: 2025 IIHF Women's World Championship in (Czech Republic) České Budějovice
  - The United States defeated Canada, 4–3 in overtime, to win their 11th Women's World Championship title.
  - Finland defeated Czechia, 4–3 in overtime, to win the bronze medal.
  - Norway and Hungary were relegated to Division I – Group A for 2026.

==== Divisions ====
- February 13 – 18: Division III – Group B in Sarajevo
  - Final Round Robin placements: 1. Bulgaria, 2. Israel, 3. Estonia, 4. Bosnia and Herzegovina, 5. Singapore
  - Bulgaria was promoted to Division III – Group A for 2026.
- March 2 – 8: Division III – Group A in Belgrade
  - Final Round Robin placements: 1. Lithuania, 2. Thailand, 3. Serbia, 4. Romania, 5. Croatia, 6. South Africa
  - Lithuania was promoted to Division II – Group B for 2026.
  - South Africa was relegated to Division III – Group B for 2026.
- April 7 – 13: Division II – Group A in Bytom
  - Final Round Robin placements: 1. Spain, 2. Poland, 3. Iceland, 4. Chinese Taipei, 5. North Korea, 6. Mexico
  - Spain was promoted to Division I – Group B for 2026.
  - Mexico was relegated to Division II – Group B for 2026.
- April 9 – 15: Division I – Group B in (United Kingdom) Dumfries
  - Final Round Robin placements: 1. Italy, 2. Latvia, 3. Great Britain, 4. Kazakhstan, 5. South Korea, 6. Slovenia
  - Italy was promoted to Division I – Group A for 2026.
  - Slovenia was relegated to Division II – Group A for 2026.
- April 13 – 19: Division I – Group A in Shenzhen
  - Final Round Robin placements: 1. Austria, 2. Denmark, 3. Slovakia, 4. France, 5. China, 6. Netherlands
  - Austria and Denmark were promoted to the Top Division for 2026.
  - Netherlands were relegated to Division I – Group B for 2026.
- April 14 – 20: Division II – Group B in Dunedin
  - Final Round Robin placements: 1. Australia, 2. New Zealand, 3. Ukraine, 4. Belgium, 5. Hong Kong, 6. Turkey
  - Australia was promoted to Division II – Group A for 2026.
  - Turkey was relegated to Division III – Group A for 2026.

=== IIHF World U18 Championships ===
- April 23 – May 3: 2025 IIHF World U18 Championships in Frisco and Allen
  - Canada defeated Sweden, 7–0, to win their sixth World U18 Championship title.
  - The United States defeated Slovakia, 4–3 in overtime, to win the bronze medal.
  - Switzerland was relegated to Division I – Group A for 2026.

==== Divisions ====
- February 28 – March 6: Division III – Group B in Bangkok
  - Final Round Robin placements: 1. Uzbekistan, 2. Thailand, 3. Turkmenistan, 4. Bosnia and Herzegovina, 5. South Africa, 6. Luxembourg
  - Uzbekistan was promoted to Division III – Group A for 2026.
- March 2 – 8: Division III – Group A in Mexico City
  - Final Round Robin placements: 1. Mexico, 2. Turkey, 3. Israel, 4. Hong Kong, 5. New Zealand, 6. Iceland
  - Mexico was promoted to Division II – Group B for 2026.
  - Iceland was relegated to Division III – Group B for 2026.
- March 17 – 23: Division II – Group B in Sofia
  - Final Round Robin placements: 1. Spain, 2. Australia, 3. Chinese Taipei, 4. Belgium, 5. Serbia, 6. Bulgaria
  - Spain was promoted to Division II – Group A for 2026.
  - Bulgaria was relegated to Division III – Group A for 2026.
- April 13 – 19: Division II – Group A in Asiago
  - Final Round Robin placements: 1. Italy, 2. Great Britain, 3. China, 4. Croatia, 5. Romania, 6. Netherlands
  - Italy was promoted to Division I – Group B for 2026.
  - Netherlands were relegated to Division II – Group B for 2026.
- April 13 – 19: Division I – Group B in Kaunas
  - Final Round Robin placements: 1. Poland, 2. Lithuania, 3. South Korea, 4. France, 5. Estonia, 6. Japan
  - Poland was promoted to Division I – Group A for 2026.
  - Japan was relegated to Division II – Group A for 2026.
- April 20 – 26: Division I – Group A in Székesfehérvár
  - Final Round Robin placements: 1. Denmark, 2. Ukraine, 3. Kazakhstan, 4. Slovenia, 5. Hungary, 6. Austria
  - Denmark was promoted to the Top Division for 2026.
  - Austria was relegated to Division I – Group B for 2026.

=== IIHF World Championship ===
- May 9 – 25: 2025 IIHF World Championship in Stockholm and Herning
  - The United States defeated Switzerland, 1–0 in overtime, to win their third World Championship title.
  - Sweden defeated Denmark, 6–2, to win the bronze medal.
  - France and Kazakhstan were relegated to Division I – Group A for 2026.

==== Divisions ====
- April 13 – 19: Division IV in Yerevan
  - Final Round Robin placements: 1. Uzbekistan, 2. Armenia, 3. Kuwait, 4. Indonesia, 5. Iran, 6. Malaysia
  - Uzbekistan was promoted to Division III – Group B for 2026.
- April 21 – 27: Division III – Group A in Istanbul
  - Final Round Robin placements: 1. Kyrgyzstan, 2. Turkmenistan, 3. Turkey, 4. South Africa, 5. Bosnia and Herzegovina, 6. Luxembourg
  - Kyrgyzstan was promoted to Division II – Group B for 2026.
  - Luxembourg was relegated to Division III – Group B for 2026.
- April 26 – May 2: Division I – Group B in Tallinn
  - Final Round Robin placements: 1. Lithuania, 2. South Korea, 3. Estonia, 4. China, 5. Spain, 6. Croatia
  - Lithuania was promoted to Division I – Group A for 2026.
  - Croatia was relegated to Division II – Group A for 2026.
- April 27 – May 3: Division III – Group B in Querétaro
  - Final Round Robin placements: 1. Mexico, 2. North Korea, 3. Hong Kong, 4. Mongolia, 5. Philippines, 6. Singapore
  - Mexico was promoted to Division III – Group A for 2026.
  - Singapore was relegated to Division IV for 2026.
- April 27 – May 3: Division II – Group B in Dunedin
  - Final Round Robin placements: 1. Georgia, 2. Iceland, 3. New Zealand, 4. Bulgaria, 5. Chinese Taipei, 6. Thailand
  - Georgia was promoted to Division II – Group A for 2026.
  - Thailand was relegated to Division III – Group A for 2026.
- April 27 – May 3: Division I – Group A in Sfântu Gheorghe
  - Final Round Robin placements: 1. Great Britain, 2. Italy, 3. Ukraine, 4. Japan, 5. Poland, 6. Romania
  - Great Britain and Italy were promoted to the Top Division for 2026.
  - Romania was relegated to Division I – Group B for 2026.
- April 29 – May 5: Division II – Group A in Belgrade
  - Final Round Robin placements: 1. Netherlands, 2. Serbia, 3. United Arab Emirates 4. Belgium, 5. Australia, 6. Israel
  - The Netherlands were promoted to Division I – Group B for 2026.
  - Israel was relegated to Division II – Group B for 2026.

== FISU World University Games ==
- January 11-22: Men's Winter World University Games at the 2025 Winter World University Games

in (Italy) Turin

  - The Canada defeated Slovakia, 3–1 , to win their second consecutive and sixth overall men's Winter World University Games title.
  - Ukraine defeated United States, 5–3 to win the men's tournament bronze medal.
- January 11-20: Women's Winter World University Games at the 2025 Winter World University Games
  - The Czech Republic defeated Canada, 2–1 , to win their first women's Winter World University Games title.
  - Japan defeated Slovakia, 2–1 to win the women's tournament bronze medal.

== National Hockey League (NHL) ==
- October 4, 2024 – April 17: 2024–25 NHL season
  - Presidents' Trophy and Western Conference regular-season winners: Winnipeg Jets
  - Eastern Conference regular-season winners: Washington Capitals
  - Art Ross Trophy winner: Nikita Kucherov (Tampa Bay Lightning)
- December 31, 2024: 2025 Winter Classic at Wrigley Field in Chicago
  - The St. Louis Blues defeated the Chicago Blackhawks, by the score of 6–2.
- February 12 – 20: 2025 4 Nations Face-Off at TD Garden in Boston and the Bell Centre in Montreal
  - February 20: Canada defeated the United States, 3–2 in overtime, to win the 4 Nations Face-Off.
- March 1: 2025 Stadium Series at Ohio Stadium in Columbus
  - The Columbus Blue Jackets defeated the Detroit Red Wings, by the score of 5–3.
- April 19 – June 17: 2025 Stanley Cup playoffs
  - June 17: The Florida Panthers defeat the Edmonton Oilers four games to two in the Stanley Cup Final to win their second consecutive and second overall Stanley Cup.
- June 27 & 28: 2025 NHL entry draft at the Peacock Theater in Los Angeles.
  - #1: Matthew Schaefer (to the New York Islanders from the Erie Otters)

== Kontinental Hockey League (KHL) ==
- September 3, 2024 – March 23: 2024–25 KHL season
  - Continental Cup and Western Conference regular-season winner: Lokomotiv Yaroslavl
  - Eastern Conference regular-season winner: Traktor Chelyabinsk
- March 26 – May 21: 2025 Gagarin Cup playoffs
  - May 21: Lokomotiv Yaroslavl defeats Traktor Chelyabinsk, four games to one in the Gagarin Cup Finals, to win their first Gagarin Cup.

== North America ==
=== Minor league professional (AHL/ECHL/SPHL) ===
- October 11, 2024 – April 20: 2024–25 AHL season
  - Macgregor Kilpatrick Trophy & North Division winners: Laval Rocket
  - Atlantic Division winners: Hershey Bears
  - Central Division winners: Milwaukee Admirals
  - Pacific Division winners: Colorado Eagles
  - April 21 – June 23: 2025 Calder Cup playoffs
    - June 23: The Abbotsford Canucks defeat the Charlotte Checkers four games to two to win their first Calder Cup title.
- October 18, 2024 – April 13: 2024–25 ECHL season
  - Brabham Cup & South Division winners: South Carolina Stingrays
  - Mountain Division winners: Kansas City Mavericks
  - Central Division winners: Toledo Walleye
  - North Division winners: Trois-Rivières Lions
  - April 16 – June 7: 2025 Kelly Cup playoffs
    - June 7: The Trois-Rivières Lions defeat the Toledo Walleye four games to one to win their first Kelly Cup title.
- October 18, 2024 – April 5: 2024–25 SPHL season
  - William B. Coffey Trophy winners: Peoria Rivermen
  - April 9 – 24: 2025 President's Cup playoffs
    - April 24: The Evansville Thunderbolts defeat the Knoxville Ice Bears in a two-game sweep to win their first President's Cup title.

=== Junior (OHL/QMJHL/USHL/WHL) ===
- September 18, 2024 – April 12: 2024–25 USHL season
  - Anderson Cup & Western Conference winners: Lincoln Stars
  - Eastern Conference winners: Youngstown Phantoms
  - April 14 – May 20: 2025 Clark Cup playoffs
    - May 20: The Muskegon Lumberjacks defeat the Waterloo Black Hawks three games to two to win their first Clark Cup title.
- September 20, 2024 – March 22: 2024–25 QMJHL season
  - Jean Rougeau Trophy & Maritimes Division winners: Moncton Wildcats
  - East Division: Rimouski Océanic
  - Central Division: Drummondville Voltigeurs
  - West Division: Rouyn-Noranda Huskies
  - March 27 – May 19: 2025 QMJHL playoffs
    - May 19: The Moncton Wildcats defeat the Rimouski Océanic four games to two to win their third Gilles-Courteau Trophy title.
- September 20, 2024 – March 23: 2024–25 WHL season
  - Scotty Munro Memorial Trophy & U.S. Division winners: Everett Silvertips
  - Central Division: Medicine Hat Tigers
  - B.C. Division: Victoria Royals
  - East Division: Prince Albert Raiders
  - March 28 – May 16: 2025 WHL playoffs
    - May 16: The Medicine Hat Tigers defeat the Spokane Chiefs four games to one to win their sixth Ed Chynoweth Cup title.
- September 25, 2024 – March 23: 2024–25 OHL season
  - Hamilton Spectator Trophy & Midwest Division winners: London Knights
  - West Division: Windsor Spitfires
  - East Division: Brantford Bulldogs
  - Central Division: Barrie Colts
  - March 27 – May 15: 2025 OHL playoffs
    - May 15: The London Knights defeat the Oshawa Generals four games to one to win their second consecutive and sixth overall J. Ross Robertson Cup title.
- May 22 – June 1: 2025 Memorial Cup at the Colisée Financière Sun Life in Rimouski
  - June 1: The London Knights defeat the Medicine Hat Tigers, 4–1, to win their third Memorial Cup title.

=== Collegiate ===
==== NCAA–Division I (USA) ====
- March 13 – 23: 2025 NCAA Division I women's ice hockey tournament (Frozen Four at Ridder Arena in Minneapolis)
  - March 23: The Wisconsin Badgers defeat the Ohio State Buckeyes, 4–3 in overtime, to win their eighth NCAA Division I Women's Ice Hockey title.
- March 28 – April 12: 2025 NCAA Division I men's ice hockey tournament (Frozen Four at Enterprise Center in St. Louis)
  - April 12: The Western Michigan Broncos defeat the Boston University Terriers, 6–2, to win their first NCAA Division I Men's Ice Hockey title.

==== U Sports (Canada) ====
- March 20 – 23: 2025 U Sports University Cup Tournament at TD Place Arena in Ottawa
  - March 23: The Ottawa Gee-Gees defeat the Concordia Stingers, 3–2, to win their first University Cup title.
- March 20 – 23: 2025 U Sports Women's Ice Hockey Championship at Woolwich Memorial Centre in Elmira
  - March 23: The Bishop's Gaiters defeat the Waterloo Warriors, 3–0, to win their first Golden Path Trophy title.

=== Women's professional (PWHL) ===
- November 30 – May 3: 2024–25 PWHL season
  - Regular season winner: Montreal Victoire
  - May 7 – 26: 2025 PWHL playoffs
    - May 26: The Minnesota Frost defeat the Ottawa Charge three games to one in the PWHL Finals to win their second consecutive and second overall Walter Cup.

== Europe ==
=== Tournaments ===
- September 5, 2024 – February 18: 2024–25 Champions Hockey League
  - The (Switzerland) ZSC Lions defeated (Sweden) Färjestad BK, 2–1, to win their first Champions Hockey League title.
  - (Switzerland) Genève-Servette HC and (Czech Republic) Sparta Praha finished in joint third place, as the losing semi-finalists.
- September 20, 2024 – January 19: 2024–25 IIHF Continental Cup
  - Final Ranking: 1. (Wales) Cardiff Devils, 2. (France) Brûleurs de Loups, 3. (Poland) GKS Katowice, 4. (Kazakhstan) HC Arlan
  - HC Arlan withdrew from the tournament prior to the final round, due to travel and timing issues. The IIHF ultimately elected to proceed with only the three remaining finalists.
- December 26 – December 31: 2025 Spengler Cup in (Switzerland) Davos
  - (Switzerland) HC Davos defeats the (United States) U.S. Collegiate Selects, 6–3, to win their 17th Spengler Cup.

=== Leagues ===
- September 10, 2024 – March 15: 2024–25 Liiga season
  - Kiekko-Espoo joined the league after promotion from the Mestis.
  - March 18 – May 3: 2025 Liiga playoffs
    - KalPa defeats SaiPa, four games to two, to win their first Liiga title, and first Finnish championship.
- September 17, 2024 – March 1: 2024–25 National League season
  - March 4 – April 24: 2025 National League playoffs
    - The ZSC Lions defeat Lausanne HC, four games to one, to win their second consecutive and eleventh overall National League title.
- September 17, 2024 – March 4: 2024–25 Czech Extraliga season
  - Presidential Cup winner: Sparta Praha
  - March 7 – April 29: 2025 Czech Extraliga playoffs
    - Kometa Brno defeats Dynamo Pardubice, four games to three, to win their third Extraliga title.
- September 19, 2024 – March 7: 2024–25 DEL season
  - Düsseldorfer EG were relegated to the DEL2.
  - March 9 – April 25: 2025 DEL playoffs
    - Eisbären Berlin defeats Kölner Haie, four games to one, to win their second consecutive and eleventh overall DEL title.
- September 21, 2024 – March 11: 2024–25 SHL season
  - Brynäs IF joined the league after promotion from the HockeyAllsvenskan.
  - Modo Hockey were relegated to the HockeyAllsvenskan.
  - March 13 – May 1: 2025 SHL playoffs
    - Luleå HF defeats Brynäs IF, four games to two, to win their second Le Mat Trophy title.

== Asia ==
- September 7, 2024 – March 23: 2024–25 Asia League Ice Hockey season
  - Leader's Flag winners: HL Anyang
  - March 29 – April 5: 2025 ALIH Finals
    - HL Anyang defeat Red Eagles Hokkaido, three games to one, to win their third consecutive and ninth overall Asia League championship.
- May 31 – June 6: 2025 IIHF Women's Asia Cup
  - Final Round Robin placements: 1. Philippines, 2. Iran, 3. India, 4. Malaysia, 5. United Arab Emirates, 6. Kyrgyzstan
- November 5 – 8: 2026 IIHF Women's Asia Championship in Oskemen
  - Final Round Robin placements: 1. Japan, 2. China, 3. Kazakhstan, 4. South Korea
- November 20 – 23: 2026 IIHF Asia Championship in Beijing
  - Final Round Robin placements: 1. Kazakhstan, 2. South Korea, 3. Japan, 4. China
- December 9 – 19: Ice hockey at the 2025 SEA Games – Men's tournament
  - Indonesia defeated Thailand, 3–2, to win their first SEA Games men's title.
  - The Philippines defeated Singapore, 5–3, to win the bronze medal.
- December 10 – 19: Ice hockey at the 2025 SEA Games – Women's tournament
  - Thailand defeated the Philippines, 13–4, to win the inaugural SEA Games women's title.
  - Singapore defeated Malaysia, 3–1, to win the bronze medal.

== Other tournaments ==
- April 22 – 26: 2025 IIHF Development Cup in Canillo
  - Final Ranking: 1. Puerto Rico, 2. Liechtenstein, 3. Portugal, 4. Greece, 5. Brazil, 6. Andorra

== Para ice hockey ==
- May 24 – 31: 2025 World Para Ice Hockey Championships in Buffalo
  - The United States defeated Canada, 6–1, to win their seventh World Para Ice Hockey Championship title.
  - Czechia defeated China, 2–1 in overtime, to win the bronze medal.
  - South Korea and Norway were relegated to Pool B for 2026.
- August 26 – 31: 2025 Women's World Para Ice Hockey Championships in (Slovakia) Dolný Kubín
  - The United States defeated Canada, 7–1, to win the inaugural Women's World Para Ice Hockey Championship title.
  - Norway defeated Great Britain, 6–0, to win the bronze medal.

== Deaths ==
=== January ===
- Larry Kish, 83, Canadian defenceman (Providence Friars) and coach (Hartford Whalers)
- Al MacNeil, 89, Canadian defenceman (Chicago Black Hawks), coach (Montreal Canadiens), and executive (Calgary Flames), four-time Stanley Cup champion (1971, 1978, 1979, 1989)
- Dwight Foster, 67, Canadian right wing (Boston Bruins, Colorado Rockies, Detroit Red Wings)
- Mickey Roth, 97, Canadian centre (Lethbridge Maple Leafs, Stratford Indians, Buffalo Bisons), World Championships gold medalist (1951)
- Hilpas Sulin, 90, Finnish player (HPK) and coach (HPK)
- Brian Gibbons, 77, Canadian defenceman (Ottawa Nationals, Toronto Toros, Denver Spurs/Ottawa Civics)
- Dave Lucas, 92, Canadian defenceman (Detroit Red Wings, Johnstown Jets)
- Hans Dobida, 95, Austrian executive (Austrian Ice Hockey Association, International Ice Hockey Federation), IIHF Hall of Fame inductee
- Marcel Bonin, 93, Canadian left wing (Detroit Red Wings, Boston Bruins, Montreal Canadiens), four-time Stanley Cup champion (1955, 1958–1960)
- Tom McVie, 89, Canadian coach (Washington Capitals, Winnipeg Jets, New Jersey Devils), Avco Cup champion (1979)
- George Faulkner, 91, Canadian left winger and defenceman (Shawinigan-Falls Cataracts, Jacksonville Rockets)
- Willard Ikola, 92, American goaltender (Detroit Auto Club, Michigan Wolverines), coach (Edina High School), and scout (New York Islanders), Olympic silver medalist (1956)
- Shawn Simpson, 56, Canadian goaltender (Baltimore Skipjacks), scout (Washington Capitals, Toronto Maple Leafs), and television broadcaster (TSN)

=== February ===
- Richard Meredith, 92, American forward (Minnesota Golden Gophers, Minneapolis Millers), Olympic gold medalist (1960) and silver medalist (1956)
- Miika Elomo, 47, Finnish left wing (TPS, Washington Capitals, Espoo Blues) and coach (Jokers de Cergy-Pontoise)
- Mike Lange, 76, American radio and television broadcaster (Pittsburgh Penguins), Foster Hewitt Memorial Award winner
- Al Trautwig, 68, American television broadcaster (New York Rangers)

=== March ===
- Dick Cherry, 87, Canadian defenceman (Boston Bruins, Philadelphia Flyers)
- Claude Verret, 61, Canadian centre (Buffalo Sabres, HC Rouen, Lausanne HC)
- Tomáš Klouček, 45, Czech defenceman (New York Rangers, Nashville Predators, Atlanta Thrashers)
- Fedor Malykhin, 34, Russian forward (Avtomobilist Yekaterinburg, Ak Bars Kazan, HC Vityaz)
- Andrei Martemyanov, 61, Russian defenceman (CSKA Moscow, Metallurg Magnitogorsk, Kölner Haie) and coach (Avtomobilist Yekaterinburg, Sibir Novosibirsk, Amur Khabarovsk)
- Mark Laforest, 62, Canadian goaltender (Detroit Red Wings, Philadelphia Flyers, Toronto Maple Leafs)

=== April ===
- Frank Moberg, 85, Finnish–Swedish executive (HIFK, Finnish national team, SM-liiga)
- Jiří Kochta, 78, Czech forward (HC Jihlava, HC Sparta Praha), World Championship gold medalist (1972), Olympic silver medalist (1968) and bronze medalist (1972)
- Alex Faulkner, 88, Canadian centre (Toronto Maple Leafs, Detroit Red Wings)
- Greg Millen, 67, Canadian goaltender (Pittsburgh Penguins, Hartford Whalers, St. Louis Blues), color commentator (Hockey Night in Canada – CBC, Sportsnet Ontario)
- Ray Shero, 62, American centre (St. Lawrence Saints) and executive (Pittsburgh Penguins, New Jersey Devils)
- Gerry McNamara, 90, Canadian goaltender (Sudbury Wolves, Cleveland Barons, Toronto Maple Leafs)
- Bev Beaver, 77, Canadian player
- Bruce Cline, 93, Canadian right wing (New York Rangers, Hershey Bears)
- Ed Van Impe, 84, Canadian defenceman (Chicago Black Hawks, Philadelphia Flyers, Pittsburgh Penguins), Stanley Cup champion (1974, 1975)
- Phil Roberto, 76, Canadian right wing (Montreal Canadiens, St. Louis Blues, Detroit Red Wings) Stanley Cup champion (1971)

=== May ===
- Dave Gorman, 70, Canadian right wing (Phoenix Roadrunners, Birmingham Bulls, Atlanta Flames)
- Lisa Brown-Miller, 58, American forward (Providence Friars) and coach (Princeton Tigers), Olympic gold medalist (1998)
- Frank Caprice, 63, Canadian goaltender (Vancouver Canucks, HC Gardena)
- Bob Lemieux, 80, Canadian defenceman (Oakland Seals) and coach (Fort Worth Wings, Virginia Wings, Kalamazoo Wings)
- Aldo Maniacco, 90, Canadian-born Italian left wing and Olympian (1956)
- Murray Anderson, 75, Canadian defenceman (Washington Capitals)
- Charles Thiffault, 87, Canadian coach (Quebec Nordiques, Montreal Canadiens, Rouyn-Noranda Huskies), Stanley Cup champion (1993)
- Kirill Lebedev, 33, Russian forward (Metallurg Magnitogorsk, Metallurg Novokuznetsk, Kunlun Red Star)

=== June ===
- Henry Leppä, 78, Finnish forward (TUTO Hockey, Jokerit) and Olympian (1976)
- Fred Hucul, 93, Canadian defenceman (Chicago Black Hawks, St. Louis Blues, Calgary Stampeders) and coach (Kansas City Blues, Victoria Cougars)
- Scott Metcalfe, 58, Canadian centre (Edmonton Oilers, Buffalo Sabres, Hannover Scorpions)
- Guido Tenesi, 71, American defenceman (Hershey Bears, Johnstown Jets, Grand Rapids Owls) and actor (Slap Shot)
- Pentti Matikainen, 74, Finnish forward (Kiekko-Pojat, SaiPa), coach (Finnish national team, Oulun Kärpät, HIFK), and executive (HIFK, Pelicans), Olympic silver medalist (1988), World Championships silver medalist (1992)

=== July ===
- Alex Delvecchio, 93, Canadian Hall of Fame forward (Detroit Red Wings), coach (Detroit Red Wings), and general manager (Detroit Red Wings), three-time Stanley Cup champion (1952, 1954, 1955)
- Lyndon Byers, 61, Canadian right wing (Boston Bruins, San Jose Sharks)
- Ilkka Mesikämmen, 82, Finnish defenceman (Porin Ässät, TPS) and Olympian (1964)
- Wayne Thomas, 77, Canadian goaltender (Montreal Canadiens, Toronto Maple Leafs, New York Rangers) and executive (San Jose Sharks)
- Patrick Sawyerr, 77, French forward (OHC Paris-Viry, ASG Tours, Nantes HC) and coach (ASG Tours, Nantes HC)
- Josef Černý, 85, Czech left wing (HC Plzeň, Kometa Brno, EC Graz), Olympic silver medalist (1968) and bronze medalist (1964, 1972), IIHF Hall of Fame inductee
- John Miszuk, 84, Canadian defenceman (Calgary Cowboys, Philadelphia Flyers, Minnesota North Stars)

=== August ===
- Peter Veselovský, 60, Slovak forward (HC Košice, HK 32 Liptovský Mikuláš, Dunaújvárosi Acélbikák), Olympic bronze medalist (1992)
- Phil Latreille, 87, Canadian forward (Middlebury Panthers, New York Rangers)
- Mats Lindh, 77, Swedish centre (Winnipeg Jets, Frölunda HC, Mora IK), World Championships bronze medalist (1972, 1975)
- Mark Kirton, 67, Canadian centre (Toronto Maple Leafs, Detroit Red Wings, Vancouver Canucks)
- Konstantin Polozov, 59, Russian centre (Salavat Yulaev Ufa) and coach (Toros Neftekamsk, Tolpar Ufa, Izhstal Izhevsk)

=== September ===
- Lonnie Loach, 57, Canadian left wing (Ottawa Senators, Los Angeles Kings, Mighty Ducks of Anaheim) and coach (Missouri River Otters)
- Andre Champagne, 81, Canadian left wing (Toronto Maple Leafs)
- Ken Dryden, 78, Canadian Hall of Fame goaltender (Montreal Canadiens), six-time Stanley Cup champion (1971, 1973, 1976–1979)
- Bob Goodenow, 72, American forward (Harvard Crimson, Flint Generals) and executive (National Hockey League Players' Association)
- Wade MacLeod, 38, Canadian left wing (Northeastern Huskies, Springfield Falcons, Manchester Storm)
- Eddie Giacomin, 86, Canadian Hall of Fame goaltender (New York Rangers, Detroit Red Wings), coach (New York Islanders, Detroit Red Wings, New York Rangers), and broadcaster (New York Islanders)
- Murray Williamson, 91, Canadian–American left wing (Minnesota Golden Gophers, Rochester Mustangs) and coach (American national team, American junior team, Genève-Servette HC), Olympic silver medalist (1972)
- Bernie Parent, 80, Canadian Hall of Fame goaltender (Philadelphia Flyers, Toronto Maple Leafs), two-time Stanley Cup champion (1974, 1975)

=== October ===
- Michael Boland, 75, Canadian right wing (Ottawa Nationals, Philadelphia Flyers) and cinematographer (The Boys on the Bus)
- Gerry Ouellette, 86, Canadian right wing (Boston Bruins, Buffalo Bisons)
- Lubomír Hrstka, 78, Czech defenceman (TJ Brno) and coach (TJ Brno)
- Conny Staudinger, 98, Austrian centre, Olympian (1956)
- Jack Kane, 89, Canadian centre (Clinton Comets)
- Cam Brown, 56, Canadian left wing (Vancouver Canucks, Baton Rouge Kingfish) and coach (Baton Rouge Kingfish)

=== November ===
- Leon Stickle, 77, Canadian linesman (National Hockey League)
- Mel Bridgman, 70, Canadian centre (Philadelphia Flyers, Calgary Flames, New Jersey Devils) and executive (Ottawa Senators)
- Roger Picard, 92, Canadian right wing (St. Louis Blues)
- Walery Kosyl, 81, Polish goaltender (ŁKS Łódź, Legia Warszawa), Olympian (1972, 1976)
- Larry Brooks, 75, American sportswriter (New York Post), Elmer Ferguson Memorial Award recipient
- Derek Holmes, 86, Canadian forward (EHC Visp, HC La Chaux-de-Fonds, HC Ambrì-Piotta), coach (Finnish national team, Swiss national team, EV Zug), executive (Canadian national team, Hockey Canada), and player agent, IIHF Hall of Fame inductee

=== December ===
- Anatoli Belyayev, 73, Belarusian centre (Dinamo Minsk, Dynamo Moscow) and coach (Dinamo Minsk, Belarusian national team, Shakhtyor Soligorsk)
- Tom Hicks, 79, American businessman (Dallas Stars)
- Bobby Rousseau, 85, Canadian right wing (Montreal Canadiens, Minnesota North Stars, New York Rangers), four-time Stanley Cup champion (1965, 1966, 1968, 1969), Olympic silver medalist (1960)
- Paul Gagné, 63, Canadian left wing (Colorado Rockies, New Jersey Devils, Toronto Maple Leafs) and coach (Timmins Rock)
- Josef Horešovský, 79, Czech defenceman (Sparta Praha, Dukla Jihlava, Motor České Budějovice), and coach (Motor České Budějovice, Sparta Praha, Horácká Slavia Třebíč), Olympic silver medalist (1968) and bronze medalist (1972)
- Robert Gaudreau, 81, American defenceman (Brown Bears), Olympian (1968)
- Guy Chouinard, 69, Canadian centre (Atlanta/Calgary Flames, St. Louis Blues), coach (Sherbrooke Faucons, Quebec Remparts, P.E.I. Rocket), and executive (P.E.I. Rocket)
- Lowell MacDonald, 84, Canadian left wing (Detroit Red Wings, Los Angeles Kings, Pittsburgh Penguins) Bill Masterton Memorial Trophy recipient

== See also ==
- 2024 in ice hockey
- 2026 in ice hockey
- 2025 in sports
