= List of women's national ice hockey teams =

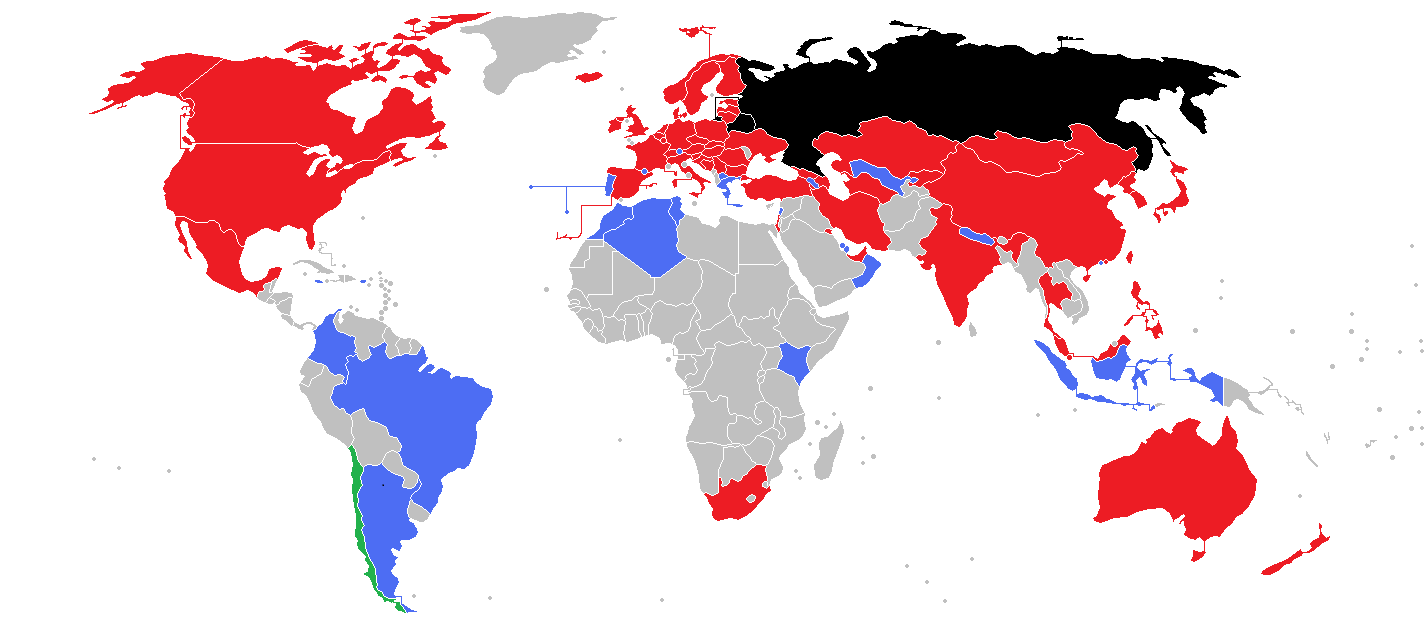
Map of the world with current members of the IIHF. (Red indicates full members, blue indicates associate members, green indicates affiliate members and black indicates suspended members.)

This is a list of women's national ice hockey teams in the world. There are fewer than 80 national women's ice hockey teams in total, with teams representing UN member states, as well as several dependent territories, sub-national entities and states who are not members of the United Nations.

== Current women's national ice hockey teams ==
This section lists the current:

- 65 women's national ice hockey teams which are members of the International Ice Hockey Federation (IIHF), including 56 full members, 8 associate members and one affiliate member.
- 2 women's national ice hockey teams which are not members of the IIHF.

=== IIHF Full Members ===
IIHF Full Members are nations that regularly participate in the IIHF-sanctioned World Championships (of either gender). Teams are ranked in the IIHF World Ranking based on their performance over the past four years.

- Australia
- Austria⮝
- Belarus^{1} ^{2}
- Belgium
- Bosnia and Herzegovina
- Bulgaria
- Canada⮝🥈
- China
- Chinese Taipei
- Croatia
- Czech Republic⮝
- Denmark⮝
- Estonia
- Finland⮝
- France
- Germany⮝
- Great Britain
- Hong Kong
- Hungary
- Iceland
- India^{1}
- Iran^{1} ^{3}
- Ireland^{4}
- Israel
- Italy
- Japan⮝
- Kazakhstan
- Kuwait^{1}
- Kyrgyzstan^{1}
- Latvia
- Lithuania
- Luxembourg^{1}
- Malaysia^{1}
- Mexico
- Netherlands
- New Zealand
- North Korea
- Norway
- Philippines
- Poland
- Romania
- Russia^{2}
- Serbia
- Singapore
- Slovakia
- Slovenia
- South Africa
- South Korea
- Spain
- Sweden⮝
- Switzerland⮝🥉
- Thailand
- Turkey
- Ukraine
- United Arab Emirates^{1}
- United States⮝🥇🏆

The participants in the 2026 IIHF Women's World Championship Top Division are marked by ⮝.
The current holder of the 2025 IIHF Women's World Championship is marked by 🏆.
The current medalists of the 2026 Winter Olympics are marked by 🥇🥈🥉.
1. Women's national team exists but has not yet participated in the World Championships.
2. Russia and Belarus were suspended by the IIHF on 28 February 2022 due to their invasion of Ukraine.
3. Iran has not participated in the senior World Championships but did enter the 2026 IIHF U18 Women's World Championship.
4. Ireland has participated in the World Championships in the past, but is currently not doing so.

Armenia, Azerbaijan, Georgia, Mongolia, Turkmenistan and Uzbekistan are IIHF Full Members but do not have women's national ice hockey teams.

=== IIHF Associate and Affiliate Members ===
IIHF Associate Members either do not have their own independent ice hockey association or have one, but do not meet the minimum participation standards for the IIHF World Championships. Teams in this category generally compete in events outside the IIHF World Championship structure; such as the IIHF Development Cup, IIHF Asia Cup (formerly Asia and Oceania Championship), Asian Winter Games, or Amerigol LATAM Cup. Chile is an IIHF Affiliate Member, a unique category for nations that only participated in the now-defunct IIHF Inline Hockey World Championship.

- Andorra
- Argentina
- Bahrain
- Brazil
- Chile (affiliate member)
- Colombia
- Lebanon
- Macau^{1}
- Puerto Rico

1. Macau's national women's team has been inactive since 2007.

Algeria, Greece, Indonesia, Jamaica, Kenya, Liechtenstein, Morocco, Nepal, North Macedonia, Oman, Portugal, Qatar and Tunisia are IIHF Associate Members but do not have women's national ice hockey teams.

=== Non-IIHF Members ===
The following countries are not members of the IIHF, but have national women's ice hockey teams that have played at least one official international match.

- Egypt

The following countries are not members of the IIHF, but have national women's ice hockey teams that have played at least one unofficial match against a club or selection team.

- Falkland Islands

== Former women's national ice hockey teams ==
The following national women's ice hockey teams have ceased to exist.

- Czechoslovakia
- England
- Scotland
- Wales

== Multinational teams ==
At the 2018 Winter Olympics, the women's teams of South Korea and North Korea competed as a single team.

- Korea

== Regional teams ==
- Bavaria
- Basque Country
- Catalonia

== See also ==
- Ice hockey by country
- List of ice hockey leagues
- List of members of the International Ice Hockey Federation
- List of men's national ice hockey teams
