= 2024 in ice hockey =

The following were the events of ice hockey for the year 2024 throughout the world.

== Olympic qualification ==
Final qualifications for the men's tournament at the 2026 Winter Olympics took place from August 29 to September 1.

- Group D: Bratislava
  - Final Round Robin placements: 1. Slovakia, 2. Kazakhstan, 3. Austria, 4. Hungary
- Group E: Riga
  - Final Round Robin placements: 1. Latvia, 2. France, 3. Slovenia, 4. Ukraine
- Group F: Aalborg
  - Final Round Robin placements: 1. Denmark, 2. Norway, 3. Great Britain, 4. Japan
- Slovakia, Latvia, and Denmark qualified for the men's tournament at the Olympics.
- Following the International Olympic Committee and International Ice Hockey Federation's decision to extend Russia's tournament ban, France additionally qualified.

== World Championships ==
2024 World Ice Hockey Divisions for the International Ice Hockey Federation (IIHF) took place between December 10, 2023 and May 26, 2024.

=== World Junior Ice Hockey Championships ===
- December 26, 2023 – January 5: 2024 IIHF World Junior Championship in Gothenburg
  - The United States defeated Sweden, 6–2, to win their sixth World Junior Ice Hockey Championship title.
  - Czechia defeated Finland, 8–5, to win the bronze medal.
  - Norway was relegated to Division I – Group A for 2025.

==== Divisions ====
- December 10, 2023 – December 16, 2023: Division I – Group A in Budapest
  - Final Round Robin placements: 1. Kazakhstan, 2. France, 3. Denmark, 4. Austria, 5. Hungary, 6. Japan
  - Kazakhstan was promoted to the Top Division for 2025.
  - Japan was relegated to Division I – Group B for 2025.
- December 11, 2023 – December 17, 2023: Division I – Group B in Bled
  - Final Round Robin placements: 1. Slovenia, 2. Ukraine, 3. Italy, 4. Estonia, 5. Poland, 6. Croatia
  - Slovenia was promoted to Division I – Group A for 2025.
  - Croatia was relegated to Division II – Group A for 2025.
- December 11, 2023 – December 17, 2023: Division II – Group A in (United Kingdom) Dumfries
  - Final Round Robin placements: 1. South Korea, 2. Lithuania, 3. Great Britain, 4. China, 5. Netherlands, 6. Spain
  - South Korea was promoted to Division I – Group B for 2025.
  - Spain was relegated to Division II – Group B for 2025.
- January 14 – 20: Division II – Group B in Belgrade
  - Final Round Robin placements: 1. Romania, 2. Serbia, 3. Iceland, 4. Australia, 5. Belgium, 6. Chinese Taipei
  - Romania was promoted to Division II – Group A for 2025.
  - Chinese Taipei was relegated to Division III – Group A for 2025.
- January 22 – 28: Division III – Group A in Sofia
  - Final Round Robin placements: 1. Israel, 2. New Zealand, 3. Bulgaria, 4. Turkey, 5. Mexico, 6. Kyrgyzstan
  - Israel was promoted to Division II – Group B for 2025.
  - Kyrgyzstan was relegated to Division III – Group B for 2025.
- January 25 – 28: Division III – Group B in Sarajevo
  - Final Round Robin placements: 1. Bosnia and Herzegovina, 2. Luxembourg, 3. South Africa
  - Bosnia and Herzegovina was promoted to Division III – Group A for 2025.

=== IIHF World Women's U18 Championship ===
- January 6 – 14: 2024 IIHF World Women's U18 Championship in (Switzerland) Zug
  - The United States defeated Czechia, 5–1, to win their ninth World Women's U18 Championship title.
  - Canada defeated Finland, 8–1, to win the bronze medal.
  - Germany was relegated to Division I – Group A for 2025.

==== Divisions ====
- January 6 – 12: Division I – Group A in Egna
  - Final Round Robin placements: 1. Japan, 2. Italy, 3. Hungary, 4. Austria, 5. France, 6. Denmark
  - Japan was promoted to the Top Division for 2025.
  - Denmark was relegated to Division I – Group B for 2025.
- January 8 – 14: Division I – Group B in Jaca
  - Final Round Robin placements: 1. Norway, 2. Spain, 3. Poland, 4. Australia, 5. South Korea, 6. Chinese Taipei
  - Norway was promoted to Division I – Group A for 2025.
  - Chinese Taipei was relegated to Division II – Group A for 2025.
- January 8 – 14: Division II – Group B in Sofia
  - Final Round Robin placements: 1. New Zealand, 2. Iceland, 3. Belgium, 4. Mexico, 5. Bulgaria, 6. South Africa
  - New Zealand was promoted to Division II – Group A for 2025.
- January 15 – 21: Division II – Group A in Heerenveen
  - Final Round Robin placements: 1. China, 2. Great Britain, 3. Netherlands, 4. Latvia, 5. Kazakhstan, 6. Turkey
  - China was promoted to Division I – Group B for 2025.
  - Turkey was relegated to Division II – Group B for 2025.

=== IIHF World Championship ===
- May 10 – 26: 2024 IIHF World Championship in (Czech Republic) Prague and Ostrava
  - Czechia defeated Switzerland, 2–0, to win their seventh World Championship title.
  - Sweden defeated Canada, 4–2, to win the bronze medal.
  - Great Britain and Poland were relegated to Division I – Group A for 2025.

==== Divisions ====
- February 23 – 29: Division III – Group B in Sarajevo
  - Final Round Robin placements: 1. Bosnia and Herzegovina, 2. North Korea, 3. Hong Kong, 4. Philippines, 5. Singapore, 6. Iran
  - Bosnia and Herzegovina was promoted to Division III – Group A for 2025.
  - Iran was relegated to Division IV for 2025.
- March 10 – 16: Division III – Group A in Bishkek
  - Final Round Robin placements: 1. Thailand, 2. Kyrgyzstan, 3. Luxembourg, 4. Turkmenistan, 5. South Africa, 6. Mexico
  - Thailand was promoted to Division II – Group B for 2025.
  - Mexico was relegated to Division III – Group B for 2025.
- April 16 – 19: Division IV in Kuwait City
  - Final Round Robin placements: 1. Mongolia, 2. Kuwait, 3. Indonesia, 4. Malaysia
  - Mongolia was promoted to Division III – Group B for 2025.
- April 21 – 27: Division II – Group A in Belgrade
  - Final Round Robin placements: 1. Croatia, 2. Serbia, 3. United Arab Emirates 4. Israel, 5. Australia, 6. Iceland
  - Croatia was promoted to Division I – Group B for 2025.
  - Iceland was relegated to Division II – Group B for 2025.
- April 22 – 28: Division II – Group B in Sofia
  - Final Round Robin placements: 1. Belgium, 2. New Zealand, 3. Georgia, 4. Bulgaria, 5. Chinese Taipei, 6. Turkey
  - Belgium was promoted to Division II – Group A for 2025.
  - Turkey was relegated to Division III – Group A for 2025.
- April 27 – May 3: Division I – Group B in Vilnius
  - Final Round Robin placements: 1. Ukraine, 2. Lithuania, 3. Estonia, 4. China, 5. Spain, 6. Netherlands
  - Ukraine was promoted to Division I – Group A for 2025.
  - The Netherlands were relegated to Division II – Group A for 2025.
- April 28 – May 4: Division I – Group A in Bolzano
  - Final Round Robin placements: 1. Hungary, 2. Slovenia, 3. Italy, 4. Romania, 5. Japan, 6. South Korea
  - Hungary and Slovenia were promoted to the Top Division for 2025.
  - South Korea was relegated to Division I – Group B for 2025.

=== IIHF World U18 Championships ===
- April 25 – May 5: 2024 IIHF World U18 Championships in (Finland) Espoo and Vantaa
  - Canada defeated the United States, 6–4, to win their fifth World U18 Championship title.
  - Sweden defeated Slovakia, 4–0, to win the bronze medal.
  - Kazakhstan was relegated to Division I – Group A for 2025.

==== Divisions ====
- March 4 – 7: Division III – Group B in Cape Town
  - Final Round Robin placements: 1. Hong Kong, 2. Turkmenistan, 3. Thailand, 4. South Africa
  - Hong Kong was promoted to Division III – Group A for 2025.
- March 4 – 10: Division III – Group A in Istanbul
  - Final Round Robin placements: 1. Belgium, 2. Mexico, 3. Turkey, 4. Iceland, 5. New Zealand, 6. Bosnia and Herzegovina
  - Belgium was promoted to Division II – Group B for 2025.
  - Bosnia and Herzegovina was relegated to Division III – Group B for 2025.
- March 17 – 23: Division II – Group B in Puigcerdà
  - Final Round Robin placements: 1. China, 2. Spain, 3. Bulgaria, 4. Australia, 5. Chinese Taipei, 6. Israel
  - China was promoted to Division II – Group A for 2025.
  - Israel was relegated to Division III – Group A for 2025.
- April 14 – 20: Division I – Group A in Frederikshavn
  - Final Round Robin placements: 1. Germany, 2. Ukraine, 3. Austria, 4. Hungary, 5. Denmark, 6. Japan
  - Germany was promoted to the Top Division for 2025.
  - Japan was relegated to Division I – Group B for 2025.
- April 14 – 20: Division I – Group B in Tallinn
  - Final Round Robin placements: 1. Slovenia, 2. Lithuania, 3. Estonia, 4. France, 5. South Korea, 6. Italy
  - Slovenia was promoted to Division I – Group A for 2025.
  - Italy was relegated to Division II – Group A for 2025.
- April 17 – 23: Division II – Group A in Sosnowiec
  - Final Round Robin placements: 1. Poland, 2. Great Britain, 3. Netherlands, 4. Romania, 5. Croatia, 6. Serbia
  - Poland was promoted to Division I – Group B for 2025.
  - Serbia was relegated to Division II – Group B for 2025.

=== IIHF Women's World Championship ===
- April 3 – 14: 2024 IIHF Women's World Championship in Utica
  - Canada defeated the United States, 6–5 in overtime, to win their 13th Women's World Championship title.
  - Finland defeated Czechia, 3–2 in a shootout, to win the bronze medal.
  - China and Denmark were relegated to Division I – Group A for 2025.

==== Divisions ====
- March 11 – 17: Division III – Group A in Zagreb
  - Final Round Robin placements: 1. Ukraine, 2. Romania, 3. Lithuania, 4. Serbia, 5. Croatia, 6. Bulgaria
  - Ukraine was promoted to Division II – Group B for 2025.
  - Bulgaria was relegated to Division III – Group B for 2025.
- March 24 – 29: Division III – Group B in Kohtla-Järve
  - Final Round Robin placements: 1. Thailand, 2. Estonia, 3. Israel, 4. Singapore, 5. Bosnia and Herzegovina
  - Thailand was promoted to Division III – Group A for 2025.
- March 31 – April 6: Division I – Group B in Riga
  - Final Round Robin placements: 1. Slovakia, 2. Latvia, 3. Italy, 4. Great Britain, 5. Slovenia, 6. Poland
  - Slovakia was promoted to Division I – Group A for 2025.
  - Poland was relegated to Division II – Group A for 2025.
- April 1 – 7: Division II – Group B in Istanbul
  - Final Round Robin placements: 1. North Korea, 2. Australia, 3. Hong Kong, 4. New Zealand, 5. Turkey, 6. South Africa
  - North Korea was promoted to Division II – Group A for 2025.
  - South Africa was relegated to Division III – Group A for 2025.
- April 7 – 13: Division II – Group A in (Andorra) Canillo
  - Final Round Robin placements: 1. Kazakhstan, 2. Spain, 3. Mexico, 4. Chinese Taipei, 5. Iceland, 6. Belgium
  - Kazakhstan was promoted to Division I – Group B for 2025.
  - Belgium was relegated to Division II – Group B for 2025.
- April 21 – 27: Division I – Group A in Klagenfurt
  - Final Round Robin placements: 1. Norway, 2. Hungary, 3. France, 4. Austria, 5. Netherlands, 6. South Korea
  - Norway and Hungary were promoted to the Top Division for 2025.
  - South Korea was relegated to Division I – Group B for 2025.

== National Hockey League (NHL) ==
- October 10, 2023 – April 18: 2023–24 NHL season
  - Presidents' Trophy and Eastern Conference regular-season winners: New York Rangers
  - Western Conference regular-season winners: Dallas Stars
  - Art Ross Trophy winner: Nikita Kucherov (Tampa Bay Lightning)
- October 29, 2023: 2023 Heritage Classic at Commonwealth Stadium in Edmonton
  - The Edmonton Oilers defeated the Calgary Flames, by the score of 5–2.
- January 1: 2024 Winter Classic at T-Mobile Park in Seattle
  - The Seattle Kraken defeated the Vegas Golden Knights, by the score of 3–0.
- February 3: 2024 All-Star Game at Scotiabank Arena in Toronto
  - All-Star Game: Team Matthews defeated Team McDavid, by the score of 7–4.
  - All-Star Game MVP: Auston Matthews (Toronto Maple Leafs)
  - Skills Competition:
    - Overall winner: Connor McDavid (Edmonton Oilers)
    - Fastest Skater: Connor McDavid (Edmonton Oilers)
    - One Timers: Nathan MacKinnon (Colorado Avalanche)
    - Passing Challenge: Elias Pettersson (Vancouver Canucks)
    - Hardest Shot: Cale Makar (Colorado Avalanche)
    - Stick Handling: Connor McDavid (Edmonton Oilers)
    - Accuracy Shooting: Connor McDavid (Edmonton Oilers)
    - One-on-One: William Nylander (Toronto Maple Leafs) (skaters), Alexandar Georgiev (Colorado Avalanche) (goaltenders)
    - Obstacle Course: Connor McDavid (Edmonton Oilers)
- February 17 & 18: 2024 Stadium Series at MetLife Stadium in East Rutherford
  - February 17: The New Jersey Devils defeated the Philadelphia Flyers, by the score of 6–3.
  - February 18: The New York Rangers defeated the New York Islanders in overtime, by the score of 6–5.
- April 18: The NHL announces the establishment of a franchise based in Salt Lake City, Utah, with the hockey assets of the Arizona Coyotes; the Coyotes franchise is subsequently marked inactive, with re-activation contingent on the construction of a new arena by 2029.
- April 20 – June 24: 2024 Stanley Cup playoffs
  - June 24: The Florida Panthers defeat the Edmonton Oilers four games to three in the Stanley Cup Final to win their first Stanley Cup.
- June 28 & 29: 2024 NHL entry draft at the Sphere in Paradise
  - #1: Macklin Celebrini (to the San Jose Sharks from the Boston University Terriers)

== Kontinental Hockey League (KHL) ==
- September 1, 2023 – February 26: 2023–24 KHL season
  - Continental Cup and Western Conference regular-season winner: Dynamo Moscow
  - Eastern Conference regular-season winner: Metallurg Magnitogorsk
  - Lada Togliatti returned to the league, after a five-season tenure in the VHL.
- February 29 – April 4: 2024 Gagarin Cup playoffs
  - April 4: Metallurg Magnitogorsk defeats Lokomotiv Yaroslavl in a four-game sweep in the Gagarin Cup Finals to win their third Gagarin Cup.

== North America ==
=== Minor league professional (AHL/ECHL) ===
- October 13, 2023 – April 21: 2023–24 AHL season
  - Macgregor Kilpatrick Trophy & Atlantic Division winners: Hershey Bears
  - Central Division winners: Milwaukee Admirals
  - Pacific Division winners: Coachella Valley Firebirds
  - North Division winners: Cleveland Monsters
  - The Chicago Wolves became the first AHL team to have no NHL affiliate since 1994–95.
  - January 13, 2024: 2024 Outdoor Classic at Truist Field in Charlotte
    - The Charlotte Checkers defeated the Rochester Americans with a score of 5–2.
  - April 23 – June 24: 2024 Calder Cup playoffs
    - June 24: The Hershey Bears defeat the Coachella Valley Firebirds four games to two to win their second consecutive and 13th overall Calder Cup title.
- October 19, 2023 – April 14: 2023–24 ECHL season
  - Brabham Cup & Mountain Division winners: Kansas City Mavericks
  - Central Division winners: Toledo Walleye
  - North Division winners: Adirondack Thunder
  - South Division winners: Greenville Swamp Rabbits
  - The Newfoundland Growlers ceased operations on April 2, 2024, without completing the final six games of the season.
  - April 17 – June 8: 2024 Kelly Cup playoffs
    - June 8: The Florida Everblades defeat the Kansas City Mavericks four games to one to win their third consecutive and fourth overall Kelly Cup title.

=== Junior (OHL/QMJHL/USHL/WHL) ===
- September 20, 2023 – April 13: 2023–24 USHL season
  - Anderson Cup & Western Conference winners: Fargo Force
  - Eastern Conference winners: Dubuque Fighting Saints
  - April 15 – May 18: 2024 Clark Cup playoffs
    - May 18: The Fargo Force defeat the Dubuque Fighting Saints three games to one to win their second Clark Cup title.
- September 22, 2023 – March 23: 2023–24 QMJHL season
  - Jean Rougeau Trophy & East Division winners: Baie-Comeau Drakkar
  - Central Division: Drummondville Voltigeurs
  - West Division: Rouyn-Noranda Huskies
  - Maritimes Division: Halifax Mooseheads
  - December 14, 2023 (in-season): The QMJHL officially changes its name to the Quebec Maritimes Junior Hockey League, replacing the term "Major," to better include the six Maritime-based teams in the league.
  - March 29 – May 14: 2024 QMJHL playoffs
    - May 14: The Drummondville Voltigeurs defeat the Baie-Comeau Drakkar in a four-game sweep to win their second Gilles-Courteau Trophy title.
- September 22, 2023 – March 24: 2023–24 WHL season
  - Scotty Munro Memorial Trophy & East Division winners: Saskatoon Blades
  - B.C. Division: Prince George Cougars
  - U.S. Division: Portland Winterhawks
  - Central Division: Swift Current Broncos
  - March 28 – May 15: 2024 WHL playoffs
    - May 15: The Moose Jaw Warriors defeat the Portland Winterhawks in a four-game sweep to win their first Ed Chynoweth Cup title.
- September 28, 2023 – March 24: 2023–24 OHL season
  - Hamilton Spectator Trophy & Midwest Division winners: London Knights
  - West Division: Saginaw Spirit
  - East Division: Oshawa Generals
  - Central Division: North Bay Battalion
  - March 28 – May: 2024 OHL playoffs
    - May 15: The London Knights defeat the Oshawa Generals in a four-game sweep to win their fifth J. Ross Robertson Cup title.
- May 24 – June 2: 2024 Memorial Cup at the Dow Event Center in Saginaw
  - June 2: The Saginaw Spirit defeat the London Knights, 4–3, to win their first Memorial Cup title.

=== Collegiate ===
==== NCAA–Division I (USA) ====
- March 14 – 24: 2024 NCAA Division I women's ice hockey tournament (Frozen Four at the Whittemore Center in Durham)
  - March 24: The Ohio State Buckeyes defeat the Wisconsin Badgers, 1–0, to win their second NCAA Division I Women's Ice Hockey title.
- March 28 – April 13: 2024 NCAA Division I men's ice hockey tournament (Frozen Four at Xcel Energy Center in St. Paul)
  - April 13: The Denver Pioneers defeat the Boston College Eagles, 2–0, to win their tenth NCAA Division I Men's Ice Hockey title.

==== U Sports (Canada) ====
- March 14 – 17: 2024 U Sports University Cup Tournament at the Mattamy Athletic Centre in Toronto
  - March 17: The UNB Reds defeat the UQTR Patriotes, 4–0, to win their tenth University Cup title.

=== Women's professional (PWHL) ===
- January 1 – May 5: 2023–24 PWHL season
  - Regular season winner: PWHL Toronto
  - February 1, 2024: PWHL All-Star Showcase at the 2024 National Hockey League All-Star Game
    - Team King defeats Team Kloss, by the score of 5–3.
  - May 8 – 29: 2024 Walter Cup playoffs
    - May 29: PWHL Minnesota defeats PWHL Boston three games to two to win the inaugural Walter Cup.

== Europe ==
=== Tournaments ===
- August 31, 2023 – February 20: 2023–24 Champions Hockey League
  - (Switzerland) Genève-Servette HC defeated (Sweden) Skellefteå AIK, 3–2, to win their first Champions Hockey League title.
  - (Czech Republic) Vítkovice Ridera and (Finland) Lukko finished in joint third place, as the losing semi-finalists.
- September 22, 2023 – January 14: 2023–24 IIHF Continental Cup
  - Final Ranking: 1. (Kazakhstan) Nomad Astana, 2. (Poland) GKS Katowice, 3. (Wales) Cardiff Devils, 4. (Denmark) Herning Blue Fox
- December 26 – 31: 2024 Spengler Cup in (Switzerland) Davos
  - (Switzerland) HC Fribourg-Gottéron defeats the (Germany) Straubing Tigers, 7–2, to win their first Spengler Cup.

=== Leagues ===
- September 12, 2023 – March 12: 2023–24 Liiga season
  - March 15 – April 28: 2024 Liiga playoffs
    - Tappara defeats Pelicans, four games to one, to win their third consecutive and 13th overall SM-liiga title, and 20th Finnish championship.
- September 13, 2023 – March 4: 2023–24 National League season
  - March 16 – April 30: 2024 National League playoffs
    - The ZSC Lions defeat Lausanne HC, four games to three, to win their tenth National League title.
- September 14, 2023 – March 3: 2023–24 Czech Extraliga season
  - Presidential Cup winner: Dynamo Pardubice
  - March 6 – April 28: 2024 Czech Extraliga playoffs
    - Oceláři Třinec defeats Dynamo Pardubice, four games to three, to win their fourth consecutive and sixth overall Extraliga title.
- September 14, 2023 – March 8: 2023–24 DEL season
  - Augsburger Panther were initially relegated to the DEL2; however, they ultimately remained in the DEL, as the DEL2 champion Eisbären Regensburg did not apply to join the DEL.
  - March 10 – April 26: 2024 DEL playoffs
    - Eisbären Berlin defeats the Fischtown Pinguins, four games to one, to win their tenth DEL title.
- September 14, 2023 – March 12: 2023–24 SHL season
  - Modo Hockey joined the league after promotion from the HockeyAllsvenskan.
  - IK Oskarshamn were relegated to the HockeyAllsvenskan.
  - March 14 – April 29: 2024 SHL playoffs
    - Skellefteå AIK defeats Rögle BK, four games to one, to win their fourth Le Mat Trophy title.

== Asia ==
- September 16, 2023 – March 24: 2023–24 Asia League Ice Hockey season
  - Leader's Flag winners: HL Anyang
  - The East Hokkaido Cranes folded prior to the season.
  - March 30 – April 6: 2024 ALIH Finals
    - HL Anyang defeated Red Eagles Hokkaido, three games to one, to win their second consecutive and eighth overall Asia League championship.
- March 24 – 30: 2024 IIHF Women's Asia and Oceania Cup in Bishkek
  - Final Round Robin placements: 1. Iran, 2. Philippines, 3. United Arab Emirates, 4. India, 5. Kyrgyzstan
- April 23 – 30: 2024 IIHF U18 Asia and Oceania Championship in Tashkent and Samarkand
  - Uzbekistan defeated Thailand, 2–1, to win their second Men's U18 Asia and Oceania Championship title.
  - Mongolia defeated the United Arab Emirates, 4–2, to win the bronze medal.
- October 31 – November 3: 2025 IIHF Women's Asia Championship in Beijing
  - Final Round Robin placements: 1. Japan, 2. China, 3. Kazakhstan, 4. South Korea
- November 6 – 9: 2025 IIHF Asia Championship in Almaty
  - Final Round Robin placements: 1. Kazakhstan, 2. Japan, 3. South Korea, 4. China

== Other tournaments ==
- April 21 – 27: 2024 IIHF Development Cup in (Slovakia) Bratislava
  - Final standings: 1. Ireland, 2. Portugal, 3. Colombia, 4. Argentina, 5. Greece, 6. Brazil
- April 24 – 28: Dream Nations Cup in (United States) East Rutherford
  - Men's tournament:
    - Algeria defeated Armenia, 7–6 in overtime, to win the gold medal.
    - The (Haudenosaunee) First Nations defeated Egypt, 6–3, to win the bronze medal.
  - Women's tournament:
    - The Netherlands defeated the (Caribbean Community) Caribbean, two games to one, to win the gold medal.
    - Egypt defeated the (Haudenosaunee) First Nations, 4–1, to win the bronze medal.
- November 7 – 13: IIHF Women's 3x3 Series in São Paulo
  - Argentina defeated Puerto Rico, 7–3, to win the gold medal.
  - Colombia defeated Brazil, 6–1, to win the bronze medal.

== Deaths ==
=== January ===
- Connie Madigan, 89, Canadian defenceman (St. Louis Blues, Portland Buckaroos)
- Paul Theriault, 73, Canadian coach (Oshawa Generals, Flint Spirits, Buffalo Sabres)
- Jaroslav Pavlů, 87, Czech-born Italian forward (TJ Rudá Hvězda Brno, Spartak Plzeň, HC Bolzano) and coach (HC Bolzano)
- Glen Cochrane, 65, Canadian defenceman (Philadelphia Flyers, Vancouver Canucks, Chicago Blackhawks) and scout (Colorado Avalanche, Anaheim Ducks)
- János Beszteri-Balogh, 85, Hungarian forward (Ferencvárosi TC) and Olympian (1964)
- Gus Hendrickson, 83, American defenceman (Michigan State Spartans) and coach (Minnesota Duluth Bulldogs)
- Petri Koivisto, 37, Finnish goaltender (Kärpät, Espoo Blues)
- Henryk Pytel, 68, Polish left wing (Zaglebie Sosnowiec) and Olympian (1976, 1980, 1984)
- Blaine Lacher, 53, Canadian goaltender (Boston Bruins)

=== February ===
- Pentti Koskela, 78, Finnish goaltender (Ilves) and Olympian (1968)
- Gerry James, 89, Canadian right wing (Toronto Maple Leafs) and coach (Moose Jaw Warriors)
- Jean-Guy Talbot, 91, Canadian defenceman (Montreal Canadiens, St. Louis Blues, Buffalo Sabres) and coach (St. Louis Blues, New York Rangers), seven-time Stanley Cup champion
- Don Poile, 91, Canadian centre (Detroit Red Wings, Edmonton Flyers)
- Dieter Kratzsch, 84, German defenceman (ASK Vorwärts Crimmitschau, SC Wismut Karl-Marx-Stadt) and Olympian (1968)
- Jiří Suchý, 36, Czech defenceman (HC Vítkovice, HC Dukla Jihlava, Šumperk)

=== March ===
- Tim Ecclestone, 76, Canadian left winger (St. Louis Blues, Atlanta Flames, Detroit Red Wings) and coach (Atlanta Flames)
- Mitch Molloy, 58, Canadian left wing (Buffalo Sabres)
- Seppo Ahokainen, 72, Finnish forward (Ilves, EC KAC, Tappara) and Olympian (1976)
- Ron Busniuk, 75, Canadian centre (Buffalo Sabres, Minnesota Fighting Saints, Edmonton Oilers)
- Sean Tallaire, 50, Canadian right wing (ERC Ingolstadt, Kölner Haie, Utah Grizzlies)
- Konstantin Koltsov, 42, Belarusian right wing (Pittsburgh Penguins, Salavat Yulaev Ufa, Atlant Mytishchi), Olympian (2002, 2010), and coach (Belarusian national team)
- Chris Simon, 52, Canadian left wing (Washington Capitals, Quebec Nordiques/Colorado Avalanche, New York Islanders), Stanley Cup champion (1996)
- Joachim Franke, 83, German forward (SG Dynamo Weißwasser, East German national team) and coach (SG Dynamo Weißwasser)
- Paul Masnick, 92, Canadian centre (Montreal Canadiens, Chicago Black Hawks, Toronto Maple Leafs), Stanley Cup champion (1953)
- Dave Forbes, 75, Canadian left wing (Boston Bruins, Washington Capitals, Cincinnati Stingers)

=== April ===
- Herold Truffer, 87, Swiss forward (EHC Visp) and Olympian (1964)
- Marian Costea, 71, Romanian right wing (Dinamo București) and Olympian (1976, 1980)
- Wally Harris, 88, Canadian referee (National Hockey League)
- Ed Chadwick, 90, Canadian goaltender (Toronto Maple Leafs, Boston Bruins) and scout (New York Islanders, Buffalo Sabres, Edmonton Oilers)
- Al Shaver, 96, Canadian radio broadcaster (Minnesota North Stars, Minnesota Golden Gophers, Minnesota Wild – WCCO, KSTP), Foster Hewitt Memorial Award winner
- Bob Cole, 90, Canadian television broadcaster (Hockey Night in Canada – CBC), Foster Hewitt Memorial Award winner

=== May ===
- Alexander Reichenberg, 31, Swedish-born-Norwegian forward (Lillehammer IK, Sparta Praha, Färjestad BK)
- Steve Andrascik, 75, Canadian right winger (New York Rangers, Hershey Bears, Michigan Stags/Baltimore Blades)
- Ron Ellis, 79, Canadian right wing (Toronto Maple Leafs) Stanley Cup champion (1967)
- Bill Friday, 91, Canadian referee (World Hockey Association, National Hockey League)
- Darren Dutchyshen, 57, Canadian television broadcaster (SportsCentre – TSN)
- Mark Wells, 67, American centre (Flint Generals, New Haven Nighthawks, Fort Wayne Komets), Olympic gold medalist (1980)

=== June ===
- Dale Yakiwchuk, 65, Canadian forward (Winnipeg Jets, Milwaukee Admirals, Kalamazoo Wings)
- Dave Gatherum, 92, Canadian goaltender (Detroit Red Wings), Stanley Cup champion (1954)
- Sergei Berezin, 52, Russian left wing (Khimik Voskresensk, Kölner Haie, Toronto Maple Leafs)
- Marty Pavelich, 96, Canadian left wing (Detroit Red Wings), four-time Stanley Cup champion

=== July ===
- Tony Voce, 43, American left wing (Philadelphia Phantoms, Ilves, Grizzlys Wolfsburg)
- Andrei Tarasenko, 55, Russian right wing (Sibir Novosibirsk, Torpedo Yaroslavl, Lada Togliatti) and Olympian (1994)
- Alex Forsyth, 69, Canadian centre (Washington Capitals)
- Leif Solheim, 91, Norwegian forward (Furuset IF) and Olympian (1952)
- Len Haley, 92, Canadian right wing (Detroit Red Wings, Edmonton Flyers, San Francisco Seals)
- Frank Chiarelli, 92, Canadian forward (Rensselaer Bachelors, Hull-Ottawa Canadiens)
- Murray Costello, 90, Canadian centre (Chicago Black Hawks, Boston Bruins, Detroit Red Wings) and Hall of Fame executive (Canadian Amateur Hockey Association/Hockey Canada, International Ice Hockey Federation)

=== August ===
- Steinar Bjølbakk, 77, Norwegian centre (Vålerenga Ishockey, Sparta Sarpsborg, Rosenborg IHK) and Olympian (1968, 1972)
- Dmitri Filimonov, 52, Russian defenceman (Molot-Prikamye Perm, Dynamo Moscow, Ottawa Senators)
- Gilles Leger, 83, Canadian coach (Toronto Toros, Birmingham Bulls), scout (Edmonton Oilers, New York Rangers), and executive (Birmingham Bulls, Quebec Nordiques)
- Mike Sertich, 77, American defenceman (Minnesota Duluth Bulldogs) and coach (Minnesota Duluth Bulldogs, Michigan Tech Huskies)
- Boo Ahl, 54, Swedish goaltender (HV71, Timrå IK)
- Bruno Frison, 88, Italian forward (SG Cortina) and Olympian (1964)
- Lasse Björn, 92, Swedish defenceman (Djurgårdens IF), Olympic bronze medalist (1952), and IIHF Hall of Fame inductee
- Johnny Gaudreau, 31, American left wing (Calgary Flames, Columbus Blue Jackets)
- John Devaney, 66, Canadian centre (EHC Visp, Alberta Golden Bears), Olympian (1980), and coach (Alberta Golden Bears, Fort Saskatchewan Traders)

=== September ===
- Vladimir Bure, 73, Russian fitness consultant (Vancouver Canucks, New Jersey Devils), two-time Stanley Cup champion (2000, 2003)
- Larry Trader, 61, Canadian defenceman (Detroit Red Wings, St. Louis Blues, Montreal Canadiens)
- Stephen Peat, 44, Canadian right wing (Washington Capitals)
- Paul-André Cadieux, 77, Canadian defenceman (SC Bern, HC Davos, HC Fribourg-Gottéron), coach (HC Fribourg-Gottéron, EHC Biel-Bienne, Genève-Servette HC), and executive (EHC Basel, Lausanne HC)
- Anders Bergman, 61, Swedish goaltender (Modo Hockey, Färjestad BK) and coach (Färjestad BK), Olympic bronze medalist (1988)
- Anatoli Melikhov, 81, Kazakh coach (Barys Astana, Kazakh men's national under-18 team)

=== October ===
- Jason Cirone, 53, Canadian-Italian centre (HC Asiago, Frankfurt Lions, Winnipeg Jets)
- John Henderson, 91, Canadian goaltender (Boston Bruins, Hershey Bears, Whitby Dunlops)
- Kordian Jajszczok, 74, Polish defenceman (GKS Katowice) and Olympian (1976)
- Donnie Marshall, 92, Canadian left wing (Montreal Canadiens, New York Rangers, Buffalo Sabres), five-time Stanley Cup champion
- Janne Puhakka, 29, Finnish left wing, (Espoo Blues, TUTO Hockey, Espoo United)
- Pete Conacher, 92, Canadian left wing, (Chicago Black Hawks, New York Rangers, Toronto Maple Leafs)
- Moe Lemay, 62, Canadian left wing (Vancouver Canucks, Edmonton Oilers, Boston Bruins), Stanley Cup champion (1987)
- Haralds Vasiļjevs, 72, Latvian winger (Dinamo Riga) and coach (Krefeld Pinguine, Latvian men's national team)
- Bill Hay, 88, Canadian centre (Chicago Black Hawks) and Hall of Fame executive (Calgary Flames), Stanley Cup champion (1961)
- Al Simmons, 73, Canadian defenceman (California Golden Seals, Boston Bruins)

=== November ===
- Kristian Antila, 44, Finnish goaltender, (Ilves, Ässät, AIK IF)
- Andrzej Hachuła, 64, Polish centre (Naprzód Janów, KTH Krynica, GKS Katowice) and Olympian (1984)
- Arnold Oss, 96, American player (Dartmouth Big Green), Olympic silver medalist (1952)
- Don Carter, 88, Canadian right wing (Greensboro Generals)
- Karel Holý, 68, Czech forward (HC Sparta Praha, HC Dukla Jihlava, ESV Kaufbeuren) and Olympian (1980)
- Mike Hasenfratz, 58, Canadian referee (National Hockey League)
- Larry McIntyre, 75, Canadian defenceman (Toronto Maple Leafs)

=== December ===
- David Bonderman, 82, American businessman (Seattle Kraken co-owner)
- Leonard Lilyholm, 83, American right wing (Minnesota Fighting Saints) and Olympian (1968)

== See also ==
- 2023 in ice hockey
- 2025 in ice hockey
- 2024 in sports
