= Philippines national ice hockey team =

The Philippines national ice hockey team may refer to:

- Philippines men's national ice hockey team
- Philippines women's national ice hockey team
