= Malaysia national ice hockey team =

Malaysia national ice hockey team may refer to:

- Malaysia men's national ice hockey team
- Malaysia women's national ice hockey team
