= 2023 IIHF Women's Asia and Oceania Championship =

Tournament details
- Host country: Thailand
- City: Bangkok
- Venue: 1 (in 1 host city)
- Dates: 30 April – 7 May 2023
- Teams: 8

Final positions
- Champions: Thailand (2nd title)
- Runners-up: Iran
- Third place: Singapore
- Fourth place: India

Official website
- www.iihf.com

The 2023 IIHF Women's Asia and Oceania Championship was an international women's ice hockey tournament organized by the International Ice Hockey Federation (IIHF). The tournament took place between 30 April and 7 May 2023 in Bangkok, Thailand. It was the IIHF women's debut for the finalist Iran and Kyrgyzstan.

Eight teams participated in the tournament and were drawn into two seeded groups. The top two teams from Group A advanced directly to the semifinals, while the bottom two from Group A faced the top two teams of Group B in the quarterfinals.

Thailand won the tournament ahead of Iran and Singapore, successfully defending their title from 2019.

== Preliminary round ==
All times are local.

=== Group A ===
Pos	Team	Pld	W	OTW	OTL	L	GF	GA	GD	Pts	Qualification
1	Thailand	3	3	0	0	0	35	2	+33	9	Semifinals
2	Singapore	3	1	1	0	1	9	16	−7	5	Semifinals
3	Malaysia	3	1	0	1	1	5	16	−11	4	Quarterfinals
4	United Arab Emirates	3	0	0	0	3	5	20	−15	0	Quarterfinals

30 April 2023; 17:00	Singapore	2–1 GWS	Malaysia	Thailand International Ice Hockey Arena, Bangkok

Game reference

30 April 2023; 20:30	Thailand	11–0	United Arab Emirates	Thailand International Ice Hockey Arena, Bangkok

Game reference

1 May 2023; 17:00	Singapore	5–2	United Arab Emirates	Thailand International Ice Hockey Arena, Bangkok

Game reference

1 May 2023; 20:30	Malaysia	0–11	Thailand	Thailand International Ice Hockey Arena, Bangkok

Game reference

3 May 2023; 17:00	United Arab Emirates	3–4	Malaysia	Thailand International Ice Hockey Arena, Bangkok

Game reference

3 May 2023; 20:30	Thailand	13–2	Singapore	Thailand International Ice Hockey Arena, Bangkok

Game reference

=== Group B ===
Pos	Team	Pld	W	OTW	OTL	L	GF	GA	GD	Pts	Qualification
1	Iran	3	3	0	0	0	63	1	+62	9	Quarterfinals
2	India	3	2	0	0	1	10	17	−7	6	Quarterfinals
3	Kyrgyzstan	3	1	0	0	2	3	30	−27	3	Seventh place game
4	Kuwait	3	0	0	0	3	1	29	−28	0	Seventh place game

30 April 2023; 10:00	Kuwait	1–3	Kyrgyzstan	Thailand International Ice Hockey Arena, Bangkok

Game reference

30 April 2023; 13:30	India	1–17	Iran	Thailand International Ice Hockey Arena, Bangkok

Game reference

1 May 2023; 10:00	Kuwait	0–20	Iran	Thailand International Ice Hockey Arena, Bangkok

Game reference

1 May 2023; 13:30	Kyrgyzstan	0–3	India	Thailand International Ice Hockey Arena, Bangkok

Game reference

3 May 2023; 10:00	Iran	26–0	Kyrgyzstan	Thailand International Ice Hockey Arena, Bangkok

Game reference

3 May 2023; 13:30	India	6–0	Kuwait	Thailand International Ice Hockey Arena, Bangkok

Game reference

== Playoff round ==
=== Bracket ===
Quarterfinals
A3	Malaysia	2
B2	India	3
A4	United Arab Emirates	0
B1	Iran	14

Semifinals
A1	Thailand	13
B2	India	0
A2	Singapore	0
B1	Iran	3

Gold medal game
A1	Thailand	3
B1	Iran	1
Bronze medal game
A2	Singapore	3
B2	India	1

=== Quarterfinals ===
4 May 2023; 17:00	Malaysia	2–3	India	Thailand International Ice Hockey Arena, Bangkok

Game reference

4 May 2023; 20:30	United Arab Emirates	0–14	Iran	Thailand International Ice Hockey Arena, Bangkok

Game reference

=== Seventh place game ===
6 May 2023; 10:00	Kyrgyzstan	1–0	Kuwait	Thailand International Ice Hockey Arena, Bangkok

Game reference

=== Fifth place game ===
6 May 2023; 13:30	Malaysia	3–4	United Arab Emirates	Thailand International Ice Hockey Arena, Bangkok

Game reference

=== Semifinals ===
6 May 2023; 17:00	Thailand	13–0	India	Thailand International Ice Hockey Arena, Bangkok

Game reference

6 May 2023; 20:30	Singapore	0–3	Iran	Thailand International Ice Hockey Arena, Bangkok

Game reference

=== Third place game ===
7 May 2023; 17:00	Singapore	3–1	India	Thailand International Ice Hockey Arena, Bangkok

Game reference

=== Final ===
7 May 2023; 20:30	Thailand	3–1	Iran	Thailand International Ice Hockey Arena, Bangkok

Game reference

== Ranking ==
Rank	Team	M	W	D	L	GF	GA	GD	Points
1	Thailand	5	5	0	0	51	3	+48	15
2	Iran	6	5	0	1	81	4	+77	15
3	Singapore	5	2	1	2	11	20	-9	7
4	India	6	3	0	3	14	35	-21	9
5	United Arab Emirates	5	1	0	4	9	37	-28	3
6	Malaysia	5	1	1	3	10	22	-12	4
7	Kyrgyzstan	4	2	0	2	4	30	-26	6
8	Kuwait	4	0	0	4	1	30	-29	0

- Singapore 1–1 Malaysia (Not counted goal in shoot out)
