= Philippines women's national ice hockey team =

Philippines
- Nickname: Philippine Eagles
- Association: Hockey Philippines
- General manager: Imelda Regencia
- Head coach: Jan Aro Regencia
- Assistants: Václav Drábek
- Captain: Bianca Cuevas
- Most games: four players (31)
- Top scorer: Bianca Cuevas (37)
- Most points: Bianca Cuevas (66)
- Team colors
- IIHF code: PHI

First international
- Thailand 21–1 Philippines (Bangkok, Thailand; March 7, 2017)

Biggest win
- Philippines 15–0 Kyrgyzstan (Al Ain, United Arab Emirates; May 31, 2025)

Biggest defeat
- Thailand 21–1 Philippines (Bangkok, Thailand; March 7, 2017)

World Championships
- Appearances: 1 (first in 2026)

IIHF Women's Asia Cup
- Appearances: 5 (first in 2017)
- Best result: (gold) Gold (2025)

International record (W–L–T)
- 18–12–0

The Philippines women's national ice hockey team is the national women's ice hockey team of the Philippines.

== History ==
The women's national team of the Philippines made its international debut at the 2017 IIHF Women's Challenge Cup of Asia in Bangkok, Thailand. The team was mentored by Filipino head coach John Steven Füglister at the tournament.

In 2018, the Philippines competed in the Division I tournament of the 2018 IIHF Women's Challenge Cup of Asia in Kuala Lumpur, Malaysia. The team finished in third place, ahead of the India and behind the first-place host Malaysia and the United Arab Emirates. The squad's head coach for this tournament was Hector Navasero.

The team improved its performance in the 2019 edition hosted in Abu Dhabi, United Arab Emirates, clinching the Division I title after a 2–1 victory over the host United Arab Emirates in the final. The team was coached by Carl Montano. With the win, they secured promotion to the top division.

The Challenge Cup of Asia was scheduled to be held at home in Metro Manila in 2020. However, the COVID-19 pandemic led to the tournament's cancellation and forced the national team into a hiatus that lasted a few years. Half of the squad that last played in 2019 had since left.

Having skipped the tournament—now known as the Women's Asia Cup—in 2023, the Philippines returned to competitive play in the 2024 edition, where it finished as silver medalist. In the 2025 edition, the Philippines won their first ever gold.

They will debut at the SEA Games in the 2025 edition where women's ice hockey will be contested for the first time.

== International competitions ==
=== World Championships ===
Year	Host	Result	Pld	W	OW	OL	L
2026	(Estonia) Kohtla-Järve	45th place (5th place in Division IIIB)	5	2	0	0	3

=== Asia Cup ===
Year	Host	Result	Pld	W	OW	OL	L
2017	(Thailand) Bangkok	5th place	6	2	0	0	4
2018	(Malaysia) Kuala Lumpur	7th place (3rd in Division I)	3	1	0	0	2
2019	(United Arab Emirates) Abu Dhabi	6th place (1st in Division I)	3	3	0	0	0
2020	(Philippines) Manila (Note: No venue was announced. There is no ice rinks in Manila city proper although there are ice rinks in Pasay and Mandaluyong.)	Cancelled due to the COVID-19 pandemic (was to enter the top division)					
2023	(Thailand) Bangkok	Did not enter					
2024	(Kyrgyzstan) Bishkek	Runners-up	4	3	0	0	1
2025	(United Arab Emirates) Al Ain	Champions	5	5	0	0	0

=== SEA Games ===
Year	Host	Result	Pld	W	OTW	OTL	L
2025	(Thailand) Bangkok	Runners-up	5	4	0	0	1
Total		1/1	5	4	0	0	1

== Team ==
=== Current roster ===
Roster for the 2025 IIHF Women's Asia Cup

Head coach: Juhani Ijäs

No.	Pos.	Name	Height	Weight	Birthdate	Team
1	G	Mikaella Zabrina Anne Lee	1.50 m (4 ft 11 in)	60 kg (130 lb)	April 17, 2008 (age 18)	(Philippines) Manila Hawks
3	D	Gerardine Ling Go	1.65 m (5 ft 5 in)	70 kg (150 lb)	July 3, 1994 (age 32)	(Philippines) Manila Hawks
4	F	Kimberly Athenna Sze	1.65 m (5 ft 5 in)	46 kg (101 lb)	December 20, 2008 (age 17)	(Philippines) Krazy to the Max
8	F	Cassia Zeth Marino	1.55 m (5 ft 1 in)	80 kg (180 lb)	January 8, 1997 (age 29)	(Philippines) Manila Hawks
9	F	Mikayla Dominique Pe Aguirre	1.58 m (5 ft 2 in)	59 kg (130 lb)	October 19, 2008 (age 17)	(Philippines) Mustangs Hockey
10	F	Bianca Yasmine Cuevas – C	1.52 m (5 ft 0 in)	60 kg (130 lb)	September 3, 1998 (age 27)	(Philippines) Manila Hawks
17	D	Gabrielle Formoso-Laysico	1.54 m (5 ft 1 in)	56 kg (123 lb)	November 17, 1994 (age 31)	(Philippines) Mustangs Hockey
19	F	Rhianne Hailie Jade Alix	1.52 m (5 ft 0 in)	55 kg (121 lb)	December 19, 2006 (age 19)	(Philippines) Krazy to the Max
20	D	Georgie Ann Regencia – A	1.49 m (4 ft 11 in)	49 kg (108 lb)	January 8, 1997 (age 29)	(Philippines) Krazy to the Max
22	D	Rita Ann Ceguerra – A	1.63 m (5 ft 4 in)	57 kg (126 lb)	December 6, 1985 (age 40)	(Philippines) Manila Hawks
23	F	Illeana Venice Jimenez	1.57 m (5 ft 2 in)	58 kg (128 lb)	September 15, 2004 (age 21)	(Philippines) Mustangs Hockey
33	F	Kathleen Nadine Tan	1.63 m (5 ft 4 in)	63 kg (139 lb)	March 27, 2003 (age 23)	(Philippines) Manila Hawks
36	D	Nikka Marie Villanueva	1.60 m (5 ft 3 in)	56 kg (123 lb)	June 5, 1989 (age 37)	(Philippines) Mustangs Hockey
39	G	Rosalyn Elizabeth Angelina Lim	1.48 m (4 ft 10 in)	48 kg (106 lb)	September 21, 2002 (age 23)	(Philippines) Eagles
71	F	Kayla Herbolario	1.54 m (5 ft 1 in)	47 kg (104 lb)	August 31, 1994 (age 31)	(Philippines) Manila Hawks
77	F	Rangel Dex Benitez	1.53 m (5 ft 0 in)	59 kg (130 lb)	July 7, 1997 (age 29)	(Philippines) Blades Hockey Club
87	F	Jasmin Cian Alcido	1.60 m (5 ft 3 in)	58 kg (128 lb)	January 18, 2006 (age 20)	(Philippines) Krazy to the Max
91	D	Kamil Cubillo	1.63 m (5 ft 4 in)	75 kg (165 lb)	April 4, 1996 (age 30)	(Philippines) Mustangs Hockey
95	F	Alyssa Candace Sanchez	1.50 m (4 ft 11 in)	63 kg (139 lb)	November 21, 1991 (age 34)	(Philippines) Eagles
98	D	Eadrea Ham	1.63 m (5 ft 4 in)	70 kg (150 lb)	January 6, 1998 (age 28)	(Philippines) Manila Hawks

== Head coach ==
- (Philippines) Steven Füglister (2017)
- (Philippines) Hector Navasero (2018)
- (Philippines) Carl Montano (2019)
- (Finland) Juhani Ijäs (2022–)

== All-time record against other nations ==
Last match update: June 4, 2025

Key
Positive balance (more Wins)
Neutral balance (Wins = Losses)
Negative balance (more Losses)

Team	GP	W	T	L	GF	GA
India	5	4	0	1	25	7
Iran	1	0	0	1	0	4
Kuwait	1	1	0	0	10	0
Kyrgyzstan	2	2	0	0	22	4
Malaysia	3	2	0	1	12	5
Singapore	1	0	0	1	2	6
Thailand	1	0	0	1	1	21
United Arab Emirates	5	4	0	1	18	11
Total	19	13	0	6	90	58
