= 2025 IIHF Women's Asia Cup =

Tournament details
- Host country: United Arab Emirates
- City: Al-Ain
- Venue: 1 (in 1 host city)
- Dates: 31 May – 6 June 2025
- Teams: 6

Final positions
- Champions: Philippines (1st title)
- Runners-up: Iran
- Third place: India
- Fourth place: Malaysia

Tournament statistics
- Games played: 15
- Goals scored: 106 (7.07 per game)
- Attendance: 909 (61 per game)
- Scoring leader: (Philippines) JC Alcido (24 points)

Official website
- www.iihf.com

The 2025 IIHF Women's Asia Cup was an international women's ice hockey tournament run by the International Ice Hockey Federation (IIHF). This edition of the tournament was held in Al-Ain, United Arab Emirates from 31 May to 6 June 2025.

The Philippines won their first ever title.

== Participating teams ==
Team	2024 result
Iran (Note: Considered as an under-18 national youth team by the Iran Ice Hockey Association. Has six players at least 18 years of age.)	Won gold medal last year.
Philippines	Won silver medal last year.
United Arab Emirates	Host, won bronze medal last year.
India	Finished 4th last year.
Kyrgyzstan	Finished 5th last year.
Malaysia	Did not participate last year.

== Standings ==
Pos	Team	Pld	W	OTW	OTL	L	GF	GA	GD	Pts
1	Philippines (C)	5	5	0	0	0	37	5	+32	15
2	Iran	5	4	0	0	1	23	6	+17	12
3	India	5	1	2	0	2	13	16	−3	7
4	Malaysia	5	2	0	0	3	19	17	+2	6
5	United Arab Emirates (H)	5	1	0	1	3	10	20	−10	4
6	Kyrgyzstan	5	0	0	1	4	4	42	−38	1

Source: IIHF
(C) Champion; (H) Host

== Match results ==
All times are local (GMT+4).

31 May 2025; 12:30	Malaysia	1–3 (1–1, 0–0, 0–2)	India	Al Hili Ice Rink, Al Ain; Attendance: 35

Game reference

Chloe Low
Goalies
Dorjay Dolma
Referee:
Foo Mei See Diana (Singapore)

PN Mohd Khan (EQ) – 04:38	1–0
	1–1	S Yangsket (T Dolkar) (EQ) – 08:21
	1–2	T Chuskit (PP1) – 48:29
	1–3	D Dolker (T Chuskit) (EQ) – 58:05

4 min
Penalties
18 min
20
Shots
23

31 May 2025; 16:00	Philippines	15–0 (4–0, 6–0, 5–0)	Kyrgyzstan	Al Hili Ice Rink, Al Ain; Attendance: 39

Game reference

Rosalyn Elizabeth Angelina Lim
Goalies
Akylai Belekova
Referee:
Choi Bo Young (South Korea)

JC Alcido (BY Cuevas) (EQ) – 02:15	1–0
JC Alcido (EQ) – 04:50	2–0
IV Jimenez (EQ) – 05:37	3–0
BY Cuevas (EQ) – 09:17	4–0
BY Cuevas (JC Alcido, K Herbolario) (EQ) – 20:20	5–0
K Herbolario (JC Alcido, BY Cuevas) (EQ) – 20:39	6–0
JC Alcido (K Herbolario) (EQ) – 26:59	7–0
JC Alcido (BY Cuevas) (EQ) – 29:56	8–0
IV Jimenez (EQ) – 34:20	9–0
JC Alcido (GL Go) (EQ) – 39:59	10–0
JC Alcido (BY Cuevas) (EQ) – 40:17	11–0
K Cubillo (EQ) – 44:00	12–0
JC Alcido (GA Regencia) (SH1) – 53:37	13–0
KN Tan (SH1) – 53:56	14–0
KA Sze (JC Alcido) (EQ) – 56:46	15–0

10 min
Penalties
6 min
73
Shots
2

31 May 2025; 19:30	United Arab Emirates	1–4 (0–2, 0–1, 1–1)	Iran	Al Hili Ice Rink, Al Ain; Attendance: 205

Game reference

Fatima Karashi
Goalies
Sara Eslami

	0–1	A Sadeghi (M Ali Beklou) (PP1) – 12:16
	0–2	A Sadeghi (M Pour Eskandar) (EQ) – 17:47
	0–3	A Sadeghi (M Pour Eskandar) (EQ) – 20:15
N Bensammoud (PP1) – 44:35	1–3
	1–4	A Sadeghi (M Ali Beklou) (EQ) – 58:19

10 min
Penalties
4 min
16
Shots
18

1 June 2025; 12:30	Kyrgyzstan	0–14 (0–6, 0–3, 0–5)	Malaysia	Al Hili Ice Rink, Al Ain; Attendance: 32

Game reference

Akylai Belekova
Goalies
Chloe Low
Referee:
Fu Zhennan (China)

0–1	HM Hazurin (NI Mohd Rothi) (EQ) – 03:55
0–2	ZR Abdullah (SR Tan) (EQ) – 06:17
0–3	JWC Lee (EJ Boon) (EQ) – 10:13
0–4	NI Mohd Rothi (EQ) – 14:05
0–5	JWC Lee (WIE Wan Zulkifli) (EQ) – 16:13
0–6	ZR Abdullah (HM Hazurin) (EQ) – 17:40
0–7	FN Muhd Fadzli Amin (SR Tan) (PP1) – 26:49
0–8	A Azra (JWC Lee) (EQ) – 32:43
0–9	ZR Abdullah (EQ) – 37:12
0–10	ZR Abdullah (NAS Mohd Zaki) (EQ) – 52:12
0–11	WIE Wan Zulkifli (NI Mohd Rothi) (EQ) – 53:32
0–12	WIE Wan Zulkifli (EQ) – 54:10
0–13	WIE Wan Zulkifli (EQ) – 58:28
0–14	JWC Lee (EQ) – 59:37

6 min
Penalties
6 min
10
Shots
44

1 June 2025; 16:00	Iran	5–1 (2–1, 0–0, 3–0)	India	Al Hili Ice Rink, Al Ain; Attendance: 27

Game reference

Sara Eslami
Goalies
Dorjay Dolma
Referee:
Foo Mei See Diana (Singapore)

A Sadeghi (S Sedighi Sadr) (EQ) – 08:12	1–0
M Ali Beklou (M Mahabadi) (PP1) – 11:20	2–0
	2–1	P Dolker (S Dolkar) (EQ) – 13:25
A Sadeghi (PP1) – 48:02	3–1
A Sadeghi (M Pour Eskandar) (EQ) – 54:13	4–1
M Pour Eskandar (EQ) – 59:49	5–1

2 min
Penalties
8 min
18
Shots
11

1 June 2025; 19:30	Philippines	6–1 (2–0, 1–0, 3–1)	United Arab Emirates	Al Hili Ice Rink, Al Ain; Attendance: 74

Game reference

Rosalyn Elizabeth Angelina Lim
Goalies
Lee Mikaella Zabrina Anne
Referee:
Choi Bo Young (South Korea)

JC Alcido (BY Cuevas) (PP1) – 11:43	1–0
JC Alcido (PP1) – 16:16	2–0
JC Alcido (K Herbolario) (EQ) – 32:07	3–0
JC Alcido (EQ) – 40:08	4–0
KN Tan (K Cubillo) (PP2) – 50:35	5–0
JC Alcido (EQ) – 55:04	6–0
	6–1	F Alali (K Shugaa, M Alawani) (PP2) – 58:15

18 min
Penalties
20 min
39
Shots
18

3 June 2025; 12:30	Iran	6–0 (2–0, 2–0, 2–0)	Kyrgyzstan	Al Hili Ice Rink, Al Ain; Attendance: 19

Game reference

Romina Esmaeili
Goalies
Akylai Belekova
Referee:
Choi Bo Young (South Korea)

P Dolatabadi (P Malekpour, A Safari) (EQ) – 06:59	1–0
M Mahabadi (P Malekpour) (EQ) – 19:42	2–0
R Hadavandkhani (M Ali Beklou) (EQ) – 32:45	3–0
F Khani (EQ) – 33:54	4–0
M Mahabadi (M Pour Eskandar, F Khani) (EQ) – 46:25	5–0
M Mahabadi (S Sedighi Sadr) (EQ) – 50:04	6–0

16 min
Penalties
4 min
24
Shots
6

3 June 2025; 16:00	Philippines	8–1 (4–0, 2–0, 2–1)	Malaysia	Al Hili Ice Rink, Al Ain; Attendance: 45

Game reference

Rosalyn Elizabeth Angelina Lim
Goalies
Chloe Low
Referee:
Tara Benard-rae (Canada)

BY Cuevas (JC Alcido) (EQ) – 1:56	1–0
IV Jimenez (KN Tan) (EQ) – 08:50	2–0
IV Jimenez (JC Alcido) (PP2) – 17:13	3–0
K Cubillo (BY Cuevas) (PP2) – 17:35	4–0
IV Jimenez (JC Alcido, GA Regencia) (PP1) – 24:45	5–0
JC Alcido (K Cubillo) (EQ) – 32:08	6–0
JC Alcido (BY Cuevas) (PP2) – 41:14	7–0
WIE Wan Zulkifli (EJ Boon) (PP1) – 53:32	8–0
	8–1	MD Pe Aguirre (AC Sanchez) (EQ) – 58:22

10 min
Penalties
42 min
43
Shots
16

3 June 2025; 19:30	United Arab Emirates	4–5 (1–2, 1–0, 2–2, 0–1)	India	Al Hili Ice Rink, Al Ain; Attendance: 67

Game reference

Fatima Karashi
Goalies
Dorjay Dalma
Referee:
Fu Zennan (China)

	0–1	P Dolker (PP1) – 05:57
	0–2	T Dolkar (S Dolkar) (EQ) – 07:55
K Shugaa (M Alawani) (EQ) – 16:31	1–2
F Alali (N Bensammoud) (EQ) – 20:27	2–2
W Al Hamdani (C Naas) (EQ) – 41:57	3–2
	3–3	P Dolker (EQ) – 44:06
	3–4	P Chorol (T Chuskit) (EQ) – 52:26
V Konecna (F Alqemzi) (EQ) – 41:57	4–4
	4–5	S Dolkar (EQ) – 63:26

4 min
Penalties
4 min
20
Shots
20

4 June 2025; 12:30	Malaysia	0–6 (0–3, 0–1, 0–2)	Iran	Al Hili Ice Rink, Al Ain; Attendance: 31

Game reference

Sara Eslami
Goalies
Nurul Ain Syuhada Mohd Zaki
Chloe Low
Referee:
Fu Zhennan (China)

0–1	S Khoylou (F Khani, A Sadeghi) (EQ) – 01:03
0–2	A Sadeghi (EQ) – 06:18
0–3	A Sadeghi (F Khani) (EQ) – 11:52
0–4	M Mahabadi (EQ) – 37:07
0–5	M Ali Beklou (M Mahabadi) (EQ) – 53:19
0–6	M Mahabadi (A Sadeghi) (PP1) – 56:26

2 min
Penalties
8 min
9
Shots
18

4 June 2025; 16:00	India	1–4 (1–2, 0–2, 0–0)	Philippines	Al Hili Ice Rink, Al Ain; Attendance: 47

Game reference

Dorjay Dolma
Goalies
Rosalyn Elizabeth Angelina Lim
Referee:
Tara Benard-rae (Canada)

D Dolker (T Dolkar) (EQ) – 08:43	1–0
	1–1	JC Alcido (RD Benitez) (EQ) – 11:58
	1–2	JC Alcido (EQ) – 12:34
	1–3	IV Jimenez (K Cubillo) (PP1) – 31:45
	1–4	KN Tan (MD Pe Aguirre) (EQ) – 34:22

6 min
Penalties
4 min
21
Shots
34

4 June 2025; 19:30	Kyrgyzstan	2–4 (1–0, 1–4, 0–0)	United Arab Emirates	Al Hili Ice Rink, Al Ain; Attendance: 73

Game reference

Akylai Belekova
Goalies
Fatima Karashi
Referee:
Foo Mei See Diana (Singapore)

A Abdymanapova (K Nurdinova) (SH1) – 02:34	1–0
	1–1	V Konecna (EQ) – 28:46
	1–2	D Alhosani (N Bensammoud) (EQ) – 31:50
	1–3	K Shugaa (F Alali, D Mokrosova) (EQ) – 33:19
A Abdymanapova (EQ) – 34:53	2–3
	2–4	K Shugaa (F Alali) (EQ) – 36:45

6 min
Penalties
12 min
14
Shots
31

6 June 2025; 12:30	Iran	2–4 (1–0, 1–3, 0–1)	Philippines	Al Hili Ice Rink, Al Ain; Attendance: 54

Game reference

Sara Eslami
Goalies
Rosalyn Elizabeth Angelina Lim
Referee:
Tara Benard-rae (Canada)

A Sadeghi (EQ) – 11:58	1–0
	1–1	IV Jimenez (GL Go) (EQ) – 21:56
	1–2	JC Alcido (EQ) – 22:44
	1–3	BY Cuevas (JC Alcido) (EQ) – 24:35
M Ali Beklou (P Dolatabadi) (PP1) – 36:16	2–3
	2–4	JC Alcido (MD Pe Aguirre) (EQ) – 57:14

4 min
Penalties
6 min
26
Shots
18

6 June 2025; 16:00	India	3–2 GWS (0–0, 1–1, 1–1, 0–0) (SO: 1–0)	Kyrgyzstan	Al Hili Ice Rink, Al Ain; Attendance: 47

Game reference

Dorjoy Dolma
Goalies
Akylai Belekova
Referee:
Fu Zhennan (China)

	0–1	N Karybekova (A Abdymanapova) (EQ) – 38:28
T Dolkar (S Dolkar) (EQ) – 39:08	1–1
	1–2	A Abdymanapova (EQ) – 52:55
DC Angmo (T Dolkar) (SH1) – 39:08	2–2

A Tokonova (miss)
BB Nurbekova (miss)
A Abdymanapova (miss)
M Bekturganova (miss)
M Isaeva (miss)
A Abdymanapova (miss)
A Abdymanapova (miss)
Shootout
(miss) P Dolker
(miss) T Dolkar
(miss) S Dolkar
(miss) S Yangsket
(miss) P Chorol
(miss) T Dolkar
S Dolkar
8 min
Penalties
2 min
38
Shots
6

6 June 2025; 19:30	United Arab Emirates	0–3 (0–0, 0–1, 0–2)	Malaysia	Al Hili Ice Rink, Al Ain; Attendance: 114

Game reference

Fatima Karashi
Goalies
Chloe Low
Referee:
Foo Mei See Diana (Singapore)

0–1	ZR Abdullah (EJ Boon) (EQ) – 32:12
0–2	ZR Abdullah (SR Tan, EJ Boon) (EQ) – 40:26
0–3	ZR Abdullah (EQ) – 43:36

4 min
Penalties
6 min
27
Shots
20
