= 2014 IIHF Women's Challenge Cup of Asia Division I =

Tournament details
- Host country: Hong Kong
- Venue: 1 (in 1 host city)
- Dates: 26–28 December 2013
- Teams: 4

Final positions
- Champions: Hong Kong (1st title)
- Runners-up: Thailand
- Third place: Singapore

Tournament statistics
- Games played: 6
- Goals scored: 53 (8.83 per game)
- Attendance: 1,271 (212 per game)

The 2014 IIHF Women's Challenge Cup of Asia Division I was an international women's ice hockey tournament run by the International Ice Hockey Federation. The tournament took place between 26 December and 28 December 2013 in Hong Kong, China and was the first edition of the Women's Division I competition under the IIHF Challenge Cup of Asia series of tournaments. Hong Kong won the tournament after winning all three of their games and finishing first in the standings. Thailand finished in second place and Singapore finished third.

== Overview ==
The 2014 IIHF Women's Challenge Cup of Asia Division I tournament began on 26 December in Hong Kong, China with the games played at Mega Ice. Hong Kong returned to international competition having last played in 2007 at the Hong Kong International Women's Ice Hockey Tournament while Singapore, Thailand and the United Arab Emirates all made their debut appearance in international competition.

Hong Kong won the tournament after winning all three of their round-robin games and finishing first in the standings. Thailand claimed second following their wins over Singapore and the United Arab Emirates, finishing four points ahead of third place in the standings. Singapore finished in third place following their overtime win against the United Arab Emirates. Thailand's Nuchanat Ponglerkdee finished as the tournaments top scorer with 11 points which included seven goals and four assists. Jenny Kai Chin Lee of Hong Kong finished as the tournaments leading goaltender with a save percentage of 100.00.

== Standings ==
Pos	Team	Pld	W	OTW	OTL	L	GF	GA	GD	Pts
1	Hong Kong	3	3	0	0	0	20	1	+19	9
2	Thailand	3	2	0	0	1	18	5	+13	6
3	Singapore	3	0	1	0	2	9	19	−10	2
4	United Arab Emirates	3	0	0	1	2	6	28	−22	1

Source: IIHF

== Fixtures ==
All times are local. (HKT – UTC+8)

26 December 2013; 19:35	Hong Kong	7 – 1 (4–1, 2–0, 1–0)	Singapore	Mega Ice; Attendance: 376

Game reference
4 min	Penalties	8 min
54	Shots	12

26 December 2013; 21:55	Thailand	12 – 0 (3–0, 2–0, 7–0)	United Arab Emirates	Mega Ice; Attendance: 223

Game reference
2 min	Penalties	10 min
57	Shots	25

27 December 2013; 20:20	Thailand	0 – 4 (0–0, 0–1, 0–3)	Hong Kong	Mega Ice; Attendance: 167

Game reference
22 min	Penalties	10 min
19	Shots	61

27 December 2013; 22:40	United Arab Emirates	6 – 7 OT (1–2, 2–0, 3–4, 0–1)	Singapore	Mega Ice; Attendance: 80

Game reference
8 min	Penalties	2 min
35	Shots	42

28 December 2013; 19:20	Hong Kong	9 – 0 (4–0, 2–0, 3–0)	United Arab Emirates	Mega Ice; Attendance: 238

Game reference
2 min	Penalties	6 min
71	Shots	9

28 December 2013; 21:40	Singapore	1 – 6 (0–1, 0–1, 1–4)	Thailand	Mega Ice; Attendance: 187

Game reference
10 min	Penalties	6 min
26	Shots	62

== Scoring leaders ==
List shows the top ten skaters sorted by points, then goals, assists, and the lower penalties in minutes.

Player	GP	G	A	Pts	+/-	PIM	POS
(Thailand) Nuchanat Ponglerkdee	3	7	4	11	+8	4	F
(Hong Kong) Adrienne May Li	3	5	4	9	+9	0	D
(Hong Kong) Estelle Claudia Ip	3	2	6	8	+5	4	F
(Thailand) Minsasha Teekhathanasakul	3	3	3	6	+6	2	F
(United Arab Emirates) Dana Al Hosani	3	4	0	4	–6	0	F
(Hong Kong) Vivian Wai Man Low	3	3	1	4	+5	2	F
(Hong Kong) Cheryl Lauren Kong	3	2	2	4	+4	0	F
(Hong Kong) Betty Wing Sze Lai	3	2	2	4	+4	0	F
(Hong Kong) Joey Suet Ning Lin	3	1	3	4	+6	0	D
(Thailand) Kritsana Promdirat	3	1	3	4	+6	0	D

== Leading goaltenders ==
Only the top goaltenders, based on save percentage, who have played at least 40% of their team's minutes are included in this list.

Player	MIP	SOG	GA	GAA	SVS%	SO
(Hong Kong) Jenny Kai Chin Lee	89:49	18	0	0.00	100.00	1
(Hong Kong) Virginia Ying Chi Wong	90:11	22	1	0.67	95.45	1
(Thailand) Wasunun Angkulpattanasuk	139:31	95	5	2.15	94.74	1
(Singapore) Caroline Leng Lee Ang	180:21	151	18	5.99	88.08	0
(United Arab Emirates) Ayla Mabwana	180:51	170	28	9.29	83.53	0
