= India women's national ice hockey team =

India
- Association: Ice Hockey Association of India
- Captain: Tsewang Chuskit
- Most games: Tashi Dolkar; Stanzin Dolkar (31)
- Top scorer: Tsewang Chuskit (13)
- Most points: Tsewang Chuskit (22)
- Team colors
- IIHF code: IND

First international
- Singapore 8–1 India (Taipei, Republic of China; 22 March 2016)

Biggest win
- India 11–0 Kuwait (Abu Dhabi, United Arab Emirates; 18 April 2019)

Biggest defeat
- Thailand 20–1 India (Bangkok, Thailand; 12 March 2017)

IIHF Women's Asia Cup
- Appearances: 5 (first in 2016)
- Best result: 3rd (2025)

International record (W–L–T)
- 10–20–0

Medal record

IIHF Women's Asia Cup
Bronze medal – third place	2025 United Arab Emirates	

IIHF Women's Asia Cup Division I
Bronze medal – third place	2019 United Arab Emirates	

The India women's national ice hockey team is the ice hockey team representing India internationally in women's competition. The team is controlled by the Ice Hockey Association of India, and a member of the International Ice Hockey Federation (IIHF). The team was formed in 2016 and currently competes in the IIHF Asia and Oceania Championship tournament.

== History ==
The India women's national ice hockey team played its first game in March 2016 at the 2016 IIHF Women's Challenge Cup of Asia Division I tournament. In their opening game of the tournament India lost 1–8 to Singapore. India went on to lose their other three games of the tournament to Chinese Taipei, Malaysia and Thailand, finishing in last place with zero points. Their 0–13 loss to Chinese Taipei at the tournament was their biggest defeat in international competition at the time. At the end of the tournament Noor Jahan was named best goaltender by the media.

They competed in the 2017 Asia Challenge Cup, where the team finished fourth in round robin stage. It was in this tournament where India won their first ever match as they defeated Philippines by the score of 4–3. But the team also suffered their worst defeat against Thailand by the score-line of 1–20. India finished the 2019 Asia Challenge Cup Division I in the third position ahead of Kuwait whom they defeated 11–0. In the 2023 Asia and Oceania Championship the team reached the semifinals but lost to Thailand and in the bronze medal match lost to Singapore 1–3.

India won their first ever medal at the 2025 IIHF Women's Asia Cup by finishing behind Philippines and Iran in third position.

== International competitions ==
- 2016 IIHF Women's Challenge Cup of Asia Division I – 5th
- 2017 IIHF Women's Challenge Cup of Asia – 4th
- 2018 IIHF Women's Challenge Cup of Asia Division I – 4th
- 2019 IIHF Women's Challenge Cup of Asia Division I – (bronze)
- 2023 IIHF Women's Asia and Oceania Championship – 4th
- 2024 IIHF Women's Asia and Oceania Cup – 4th
- 2025 IIHF Women's Asia Cup – (bronze)

== Results ==
#	Year	M	W	D	L	GF	GA	GD
1	2016 Asia Cup Div I	4	0	0	4	5	39	-34
2	2017 Asia Cup	6	2	0	4	16	52	-36
3	2018 Asia Cup Div I	3	0	0	3	3	17	-14
4	2019 Asia Cup Div I	3	1	0	2	13	9	+4
5	2023 Asia Cup	6	3	0	3	14	35	-21
6	2024 Asia Cup	4	1	0	3	7	22	-15
7	2025 Asia Cup	5	3	0	2	13	16	-3
Total	7 Games	31	10	0	21	71	190	-119

== Players and personnel ==
=== Team roster ===
For the 2025 IIHF Women's Asia Cup

#	Name	Pos	S/G	Birthdate
3	Stanzin Dolkar	F	R	25 October 1995 (age 30)
4	Tsewang Chuskit (C)	F	R	12 July 1993 (age 33)
5	Dechen Dolker (A)	F	R	25 November 1992 (age 33)
8	Tashi Dolker	F	R	5 August 1999 (age 27)
10	Sonam Angmo	F	R	3 October 1999 (age 27)
13	Rigzin Yangdol	D	R	2 August 1995 (age 31)
14	Sharap Yangshet	D	R	14 March 1995 (age 31)
18	Skarma Rinchen	F	L	25 March 2003 (age 23)
19	Diskit Chhonzom Angmo	F	R	19 August 1996 (age 30)
20	Rinchen Dolma	F	L	25 September 1990 (age 36)
22	Sherap Zangmo	D	L	4 December 1997 (age 28)
29	Punchok Dolma	F	R	8 March 1994 (age 32)
41	Tanzin Saldon	F	L	27 September 2000 (age 26)
44	Dorjay Dolma	G	L	5 June 1993 (age 33)
74	Padma Dolker	F	R	15 December 1997 (age 28)
77	Stanzin Chotso	D	R	18 June 1999 (age 27)
85	Padma Lhundup	G	L	30 April 2002 (age 24)
87	Sonam Angmo	D	L	14 October 2001 (age 24)
88	Stanzin Zangmo	D	R	4 July 1999 (age 27)
94	Padma Chorol (A)	F	R	4 April 1994 (age 32)

=== Team staff ===
For the 2025 IIHF Women's Asia Cup

- Head coach: (Canada) Darrin Harrold
- Assistant coach: (India) Amit Belwal
- Assistant coach: (India) Tsewang Gyaltson
- Assistant coach: (India) Amir Ali
- Assistant coach: (India) Bharat Singh
- Team leader: (India) Harjinder Singh

== All-time record against other nations ==
Last match update: 6 June 2025

Key
Positive balance (more Wins)
Neutral balance (Wins = Losses)
Negative balance (more Losses)

Team	GP	W	T	L	GF	GA
Australia	1	0	0	1	1	6
Chinese Taipei	1	0	0	1	0	13
Iran	2	0	0	2	1	27
Kuwait	2	2	0	0	17	0
Kyrgyzstan	3	3	0	0	12	5
Malaysia	5	3	0	2	14	18
Philippines	5	1	0	4	7	25
Singapore	3	0	0	3	3	20
Thailand	3	0	0	3	2	45
United Arab Emirates	5	1	0	4	13	22
Total	30	10	0	20	70	181

== See also ==
- India men's national junior ice hockey team
- India men's national under-18 ice hockey team
- Indian Ice Hockey Championship
