= Frank Moberg =

Finnish-Swedish ice hockey executive (1940–2025)

- Born: 27 March 1940; Turku, Finland
- Died: 3 April 2025 (aged 85); Stockholm, Sweden
- Other name: Mr. IFK
- Citizenship: Finnish-Swedish
- Occupation: Ice hockey executive
- Years active: 1968–2001
- Known for: Contributions to HIFK and Finnish ice hockey
- Political party: Swedish People's Party of Finland
- Relatives: Toni Mäkiaho (son-in-law), Daniel Mäkiaho (grandson)
- Awards: Finnish Hockey Hall of Fame (2000)

Frank Moberg (27 March 1940 – 3 April 2025) was a Finnish-Swedish ice hockey executive and influential figure in the sport. He was closely associated with the Helsinki-based hockey club HIFK, earning the nickname "Mr. IFK." Moberg played a pivotal role in the development of Finnish ice hockey, contributing significantly to the sport at both domestic and international levels.

== Early life and career ==
Frank Moberg was born in Turku, Finland on 27 March 1940. In addition to his involvement in sports administration, he worked for many years in the family business, balancing his professional and sporting commitments.

=== Contributions to HIFK ===
Moberg began his association with HIFK in 1968, serving as the club’s treasurer until 1976. He was later appointed chairman of the club, a position he held from 1976 to 1990. From 1987 to 2001, he served as the club’s CEO, overseeing its operations and contributing to its growth and success. Moberg was also a member of the board of HIFK's league association, which owns the majority of HIFK-Hockey's shares.

=== Role in Finnish national team ===
Moberg served as team manager for the Finnish national ice hockey team on three occasions: 1974–1975, 1977–1980, and 1988–1989. His leadership and organizational skills were instrumental in supporting the team during these periods.

=== Involvement in SM-liiga and NHL ===
Moberg was a key figure in the Sm-liiga, Finland's premier professional ice hockey league, from its inception. He served as a member of the SM-liiga's union board from 1975 to 1991 and later joined the league's management in 1992. Additionally, Moberg worked as a scout for the NHL team Quebec Nordiques from 1989 to 1993, contributing to talent identification for the organization.

== Recognition and honors ==
In 2000, Moberg was inducted into the Finnish Hockey Hall of Fame as Finnish Ice Hockey Lion number 125, in recognition of his significant contributions to the sport.

== Political career ==
Moberg was a candidate for the Swedish People's Party of Finland (RKP) in the 2007 Finnish parliamentary election. He received 1,052 votes in the Helsinki (constituency) but was not elected to Parliament.

== Personal life and death ==
Moberg worked as the manager of Hotel Hesperia from the early 1970s until 1987. He was married and had a family with strong ties to ice hockey. His son-in-law, Toni Mäkiaho, and grandson, Daniel Mäkiaho, both pursued careers in professional ice hockey.

Moberg died in Stockholm, Sweden on 3 April 2025, at the age of 85.

== Literature ==
- Pohjalainen, Ahti: Frank: Frank Mobergin tarina. WSOY, 2006. ISBN 951-0-31995-3
- Moberg's information on the Hockey Museum's page
