= Jaroslav Pavlů =

Czechoslovak ice hockey player (1936–2024)

- Born: 27 December 1936 Třebíč, Czechoslovakia
- Died: 9 January 2024 (aged 87) Třebíč, Czech Republic

Jaroslav Pavlů (27 December 1936 – 9 January 2024) was a Czechoslovak-born Italian professional ice hockey player and an assistant coach.

== Player ==
In Czechoslovakia, after his youth with SK Horácká Slavia Třebíč, he played for HC Plzeň (in 1954–1955 and in 1959–1969, with the last three seasons in the second series) and HC Kometa Brno (from 1955 to 1959, with three championships won). From 1969 he moved to Italy, where he played until 1980 with the shirt of HC Bolzano, with which he won three championships: 1976–77, 1977–78 and 1978–79.

Pavlů won two more championships as a coach, again with HC Bolzano: 1981–82 and 1982–83. He later also coached the other Bolzano team, EV Bozen 84. Both his son Martin Pavlu and grandson Jan followed in his footsteps, becoming ice hockey players. Jaroslav and Martin played together for two seasons for HC Bolzano.

Pavlů died in Třebíč on 9 January 2024, at the age of 87.
