= Bahrain women's national ice hockey team =

Bahrain
- Most games: Several players (4)
- Top scorer: Aishylu Karimova (11)
- Most points: Aishylu Karimova (11)
- Team colors
- IIHF code: BHR

Ranking
- Current IIHF: (▲ ) (21 April 2025)

First international
- Kuwait 5–0 Bahrain (Kuwait City, Kuwait; 26 August 2022)

Biggest defeat
- Iran 10–1 Bahrain (Kazan, Russia; 16 January 2023)

International record (W–L–T)
- 0–3–0

The Bahraini women's national ice hockey team (Arabic: منتخب البحرين لهوكي الجليد للسيدات) is the women's national ice hockey team of Bahrain. In September 2024, Bahrain was added as a full member by the IIHF.
