= Aldo Maniacco =

Italian ice hockey player (1934–2025)

Personal information
- Nationality: Italian
- Born: 4 November 1934; Sault Ste. Marie, Ontario, Canada
- Died: 10 May 2025 (aged 90); Sault Ste. Marie, Ontario, Canada

Sport
- Sport: Ice hockey

Aldo Maniacco (4 November 1934 – 10 May 2025) was a Canadian-born Italian ice hockey player. He competed in the men's tournament at the 1956 Winter Olympics. Maniacco died on 10 May 2025, at the age of 90.
