= Iran women's national ice hockey team =

National ice hockey team

Iran
- Nickname: The White Lioness (شیرهای سفید)
- Association: Islamic Republic of Iran Skating Federation
- Most games: Several players (6)
- Top scorer: Fatemeh Esmaili (17)
- Most points: Fatemeh Esmaili (26)
- Home stadium: Ice Box, Tehran
- Team colors
- IIHF code: IRI

First international
- Iran 4–1 United Arab Emirates (Kazan, Russia; 15 January 2023)

Biggest win
- Iran 26–0 Kyrgyzstan (Bangkok, Thailand; 3 May 2023)

Biggest defeat
- Russia 25–0 Iran (Novogorsk, Russia; 6 December 2024)

International record (W–L–T)
- 13–5–1

The Iran women's national ice hockey team (Persian: تیم ملی هاکی روی یخ بانوان ایران) is the national women's ice hockey team of Iran.

== History ==
The team began practicing in 2019 at the Iran Mall and played its first game in December 2021. The team competed in its first International Ice Hockey Federation championship in 2023.

== Tournament record ==
=== Events ===
- 2021 Dubai Cup
- 2023 Kazan Cup
- 2023 IIHF Women's Asia and Oceania Championship
- 2023 Al Ain Cup (As Ice Box with young players)
- 2023 IIHF Development Cup
- 2024 IIHF Women's Asia and Oceania Cup

=== World Championship ===
- 1990-2021 - did not enter
- 2022 IIHF Women's World Championship Division III - Withdraw
- 2023-2024 - did not enter

=== IIHF Asia Cup ===
Year	Host	Result	Pld	W	OTW	OTL	L	GF	GA	GD
2010 through 2019		did not enter								
2023	(Thailand) Bangkok	Runners-up	6	5	0	0	1	81	4	+77
2024	(Kyrgyzstan) Bishkek	Champion	4	4	0	0	0	36	0	+36
2025	(United Arab Emirates) Al Ain	Runners-up (Note: Considered as an under-18 national youth team by the Iran Ice Hockey Association. Has six players at least 18 years of age.)	5	4	0	0	1	23	6	+17
Total		3/10	15	13	0	0	2	140	10	+130

=== IIHF Women's Development Cup ===
Year	Host	Result	Pld	W	OTW	OTL	L	GF	GA	GD
2022	Kuwait City	did not enter								
2023	(Poland) Krynica-Zdrój	Third Place	5	2	0	0	3	11	11	0
Total		1/2	5	2	0	0	3	11	11	0

=== Friendly Cup ===
1. 2021 Dubai Cup – (silver) Silver medal
2. 2023 Kazan Cup – (silver) Silver medal
3. 2023 Al Ain Cup – (silver) Silver medal

== Rosters ==
=== Players ===
==== Official Games ====
- 2023 Asian Cup:
- 2023 IIHF Women's Development Cup:
- 2024 Asian Cup:

==== Friendly Games ====
- 2021 Dubai Cup: 1-Faizeh Modbar 2-Azam Al-Sadat Sanai 3-Elham Moderi Dehghan 4-Fateme Esmaili 5-Negar Khorram 6-Helia Sohani 7-Asal Heydari 8-Maral Rasakh 9-Negar Arjamand 10-Azin Qaroni 11-Diba Farzamnia 12-Diana Farzamnia 13-Saba Mazaheri 14-Marzieh Sadat Seyed Qandi 15-Fatemeh Shahsund 16-Hadith Porhashmi 17-Zahra Rezaei 18-Zohra Hosni 19-Shabnam Arab 20-Sogol Javadian 21-Metin Sayad 22-Arzoo Izadi 23-Mahshid Mohammadi 24-Maleeha Khorram Bagheri 25-Atieh Rezaei.
- 2023 Kazan Cup: 1-Azam Al-Sadat Sanai 2-Negar Arjamand 3-Elham Madir Dehghan 4-Shabnam Arab 5-Negar Khorram 6-Fateme Esmaili 7-Zahra Rezaei 8-Helia Sohani 9-Saba Mazaheri 10-Azin Qaroni 11-Hadithapour Hashemi 12-Diba Farzam Niya 13-Asal Heydari 14-Fatemeh Shahsund 15-Zohra Hosni 16-Diana Farzam Niya 17-Hadith Khalaj 18-Zahra Ghasemi 19-Mahdieh Nowrozi 20-Haniye Aghamohammadi.
- 2023 Al Ain Cup: 1-Negar Khorram 2-Sogul Javadian 3-Shabnam Arab 4-Yeganeh Bahrami 5-Parinaz Malekpour 6-Darsa Rahmani 7-Sogand Aghaei 8-Nahal Miraj 9-Nagin Miraj 10-Elena Khorminia 11-Hediha Aghaei 12-Fateme Esmaili 13-Sarina Khosravi 14-Hasti Suri 15-Saba Ahmadi 16-Charmin Tabatabai 17-Elham Dehghan 18-Melika Mahabadi 19-Sara Eslami.

== All-time record ==
Last match update: 30 March 2024

- Only official matches.

Key
Positive balance (more Wins)
Neutral balance (Wins = Losses)
Negative balance (more Losses)

Team	M	W	T	L	GF	GA	GD
India	2	2	0	0	27	1	+26
United Arab Emirates	3	3	0	0	34	1	+33
Kuwait	1	1	0	0	20	0	+20
Bahrain	1	1	0	0	10	1	+9
Singapore	1	1	0	0	3	0	+3
Thailand	1	0	0	1	1	3	-2
Philippines	1	1	0	0	4	0	+4
Saudi Arabia	1	0	1	0	3	3	0
Kyrgyzstan	2	2	0	0	32	0	+32
Ireland	2	2	0	0	9	3	+6
Argentina	2	0	0	2	2	7	-5
Colombia	1	0	0	1	0	1	-1
Total (12)	18	13	1	4	145	20	+125

== Results ==
Number	Year	Opponent	Result
Dubai Cup (Amateur World Cup)
1	19 Oct 2021	United Arab Emirates (All Stars League)	3-0 W
2	19 Oct 2021	Russia (Red Racket Club Team)	4-2 W
3	20 Oct 2021	Russia (Red Racket Club Team)	1-4 L
4	21 Oct 2021	United Arab Emirates (All Stars League)	4-0 W
5	21 Oct 2021	Russia (Red Racket Club Team)	? L
Kazan Cup (Islamic Cup)
6	Jan 15, 2023	Russia (Tatarstan)	1-4 L
7	Jan 16, 2023	United Arab Emirates	4-1 W
8	Jan 16, 2023	Bahrain	10-1 W
9	Jan 17, 2023	Saudi Arabia	3-3 D (3-1 Win in Penalty)
10	Jan 19, 2023	Russia (Tatarstan)	5-5 D (? Lose in Penalty)
2023 IIHF Women's Asia and Oceania Championship
11	30 April 2023	India	17-1 W
12	1 May 2023	Kuwait	20-0 W
13	3 May 2023	Kyrgyzstan	26-0 W
14	4 May 2023	United Arab Emirates	14-0 W
15	6 May 2023	Singapore	3-0 W
16	7 May 2023	Thailand	1-3 L
2023 Al Ain Cup
17	7 Sep 2023	Philippines (Eagles)	7-2 W
18	7 Sep 2023	Mexico (Panthers)	6-0 W
19	8 Sep 2023	United Arab Emirates (Falcons)	14-0 W
20	9 Sep 2023	United Arab Emirates (Yas)	9-0 W
21	9 Sep 2023	United Arab Emirates (Al Zahabi)	2-4 L
2023 IIHF Development Cup
22	6 Nov 2023	Colombia	0-1 L
23	7 Nov 2023	Argentina	1-5 L
24	8 Nov 2023	Ireland	6-2 W
25	11 Nov 2023	Argentina	1-2 L
26	12 Nov 2023	Ireland	3-1 W
2024 IIHF Women's Asia and Oceania Cup
27	24 March 2024	United Arab Emirates	16-0 W
28	25 March 2024	Kyrgyzstan	6-0 W
29	29 March 2024	India	10-0 W
30	30 March 2024	Philippines	4-0 W

== See also ==
- Iran men's national ice hockey team
- Iran women's national under-18 ice hockey team
- Iran men's national under-18 ice hockey team
- Iran Ice Hockey Championships (Men and Women Leagues)
