= Conny Staudinger =

Austrian ice hockey player (1927–2025)

Konrad Ludwig "Conny" Staudinger (15 July 1927 – 12 October 2025) was an Austrian ice hockey player who competed in the 1956 Winter Olympics.

Staudinger died on 12 October 2025, at the age of 98.
