= Patrick Sawyerr =

French ice hockey player and coach (1947–2025)

- Born: 25 November 1947 Granville, France
- Died: 18 July 2025 (aged 77)
- Position: Forward
- Played for: US Métro Paris; OHC Paris-Viry; CG Poitiers; ASG Tours; Nantes HC
- Coached for: ASG Tours; Nantes HC; Valence HG

Patrick Sawyerr (25 November 1947 – 18 July 2025) was a French ice hockey player and coach.

== Biography ==
Born in Granville on 25 November 1947, Sawyerr was the son of professional boxer Henri Soya, originally from Conakry, Guinea. He made his debut in the Ligue Magnus with US Métro Paris. The club changed its name to OHC Paris-Viry, but he rose to prominence with ASG Tours, of which he was a founding member. In its first season in the top level of French ice hockey, the club placed third. In 1978, the club won the Coupe de France in a 6–4 victory over CPM Croix. However, the club came up short of the title the following season. That season, disagreements between different international players and their styles led to serious disruptions in team chemistry. However, Sawyerr reflected positively on his time with the club.

Sawyerr died on 18 July 2025, at the age of 77.
