= Hilpas Sulin =

Finnish ice hockey player and coach (1934–2025)

Hilpas Sulin (7 September 1934 – 13 January 2025) was a Finnish ice-hockey player and coach. He played 87 matches and scored 50 points for HPK between the years 1952–1960. He also coached HPK from 1968 to 1975, and again from 1978 to 1981. Sulin died on 13 January 2025, at the age of 90.
