= Kuwait women's national ice hockey team =

Kuwait
- The emblem of Kuwait is the badge used on national team jerseys.
- Association: Kuwait Ice Hockey Association
- General manager: Khaled Almutairi
- Head coach: Meshal Alajmi
- Captain: Rawan Albahouh
- Team colors
- IIHF code: KUW

First international
- Philippines 10–0 Kuwait (Abu Dhabi, United Arab Emirates; 15 April 2019)

Biggest win
- Kuwait 5–0 Bahrain (Kuwait City, Kuwait; 26 August 2022); Kuwait 5–0 Andorra (Kuwait City, Kuwait; 7 November 2022)

Biggest defeat
- Iran 20–0 Kuwait (Bangkok, Thailand; 1 May 2023)

IIHF Women's Challenge Cup of Asia Division I
- Appearances: 1 (first in 2019)
- Best result: 9th (2019)

International record (W–L–T)
- 4–9–0

The Kuwait women's national ice hockey team (Arabic: منتخب الكويت لهوكي الجليد للسيدات) is the ice hockey team representing Kuwait internationally in women's competition. The team is overseen by the Kuwait Ice Hockey Association, a member of the International Ice Hockey Federation (IIHF). The team was formed in 2017 and currently competes in the IIHF Women's Challenge Cup of Asia Division I tournament.

== History ==
The Kuwait women's national ice hockey team played its first games in October and November 2017 at the Land of Smiles Ice Hockey Tournament in Bangkok, Thailand. Kuwait played four games at the tournament against club teams from Australia, Malaysia, the United Arab Emirates and the United States. They lost all four of their games and failed to record any goals. In May 2018 Kuwait took part in the Women's Gulf Ice Hockey Championships being held in Abu Dhabi, United Arab Emirates. Playing in five games against club teams from the United Arab Emirates Kuwait won three of their games and lost two. In October and November 2018 Kuwait took part in their second Land of Smiles Ice Hockey Tournament where they competed in four games against club teams from Indonesia, Thailand and the United Arab Emirates. They lost all four of their games and managed to record only one goal.

Kuwait made their debut in international competition in April 2019 at the 2019 IIHF Women's Challenge Cup of Asia Division I tournament in Abu Dhabi, United Arab Emirates. In their opening game of the tournament Kuwait lost 0–10 to the Philippines. Kuwait went on to lose their other two games of the tournament to India and the United Arab Emirates, finishing in last place with zero points. Their 0–13 loss to the United Arab Emirates was at the time their biggest defeat in international competition. At the end of the tournament Ayah Alsarraf was named best goaltender by the IIHF Directorate and the coaches named Sarah Aldayouli as the best player of the team.

== International competitions ==
=== IIHF Women's Challenge Cup of Asia ===
- 2019 IIHF Women's Challenge Cup of Asia Division I. Finish: 4th
- 2023 IIHF Women's Asia and Oceania Championship

=== IIHF Women's Development Cup ===
Year	Host	Result	Pld	W	T	L
2022	Kuwait City	2nd place	5	3	0	2
Total		1/1	5	3	0	2

== Players and personnel ==
=== Team roster ===
From the team's most recent tournament

#	Name	Pos	S/G	Age	Team
24	Fatema Abdulateef	D	R	41	Kuwait Diamonds
23	Zainab Abdullatif	D	L	28	Kuwait Diamonds
10	Rawan Albahouh (C)	F	L	34	Kuwait Blue Waves
4	Aishah Aldayouli	F	L	36	Kuwait Blue Waves
12	Khaldah Aldayouli	F	L	24	Kuwait Wildcats
22	Maryam Aldayouli	F	R	36	Kuwait Diamonds
8	Rawan Aldayouli	D	R	29	Kuwait Wildcats
7	Sarah Aldayouli	D	R	36	Kuwait Wildcats
11	Fatma Alhaddad	F	R	25	Kuwait Wildcats
2	Lama Alnajjar	F	R	26	Kuwait Wildcats
3	Walah Alnajjar (A)	F	R	34	Kuwait Diamonds
25	Ayah Alsarraf	G	L	23	Kuwait Wildcats
5	Dalal Alsulaibi	F	R	29	Kuwait Blue Waves
1	Maryam Ataallah	D	L	38	Kuwait Blue Waves
21	Shaikhah Atallah (A)	F	L	30	Kuwait Blue Waves
17	Aseel Habeeb	F	L	32	Kuwait Blue Waves
6	Shouq Hendal	F	L	35	Kuwait Diamonds
20	Wdad Hendal	G	L	33	Kuwait Wildcats
9	Zahraa Hendal	D	L	25	Kuwait Blue Waves
13	Rima Hussain	D	L	32	Kuwait Wildcats

=== Team staff ===
From the team's most recent tournament

- Head coach: Meshal Alajmi
- General manager: Khaled Almutairi
- Team leader: Laila Alkhbaz
- Equipment manager: Ramadan Abdelmeguid
- Team staff: Maryam Alkhars
