= Kyrgyzstan women's national ice hockey team =

Kyrgyzstan
- Association: Ice Hockey Federation of the Kyrgyz Republic
- Home stadium: Bishkek Arena
- Team colors
- IIHF code: KGZ

First international
- Kuwait 1–3 Kyrgyzstan (Bangkok, Thailand; 30 April 2023)

Biggest win
- Kuwait 1–3 Kyrgyzstan (Bangkok, Thailand; 30 April 2023)

Biggest defeat
- Iran 26–0 Kyrgyzstan (Bangkok, Thailand; 3 May 2023)

IIHF Asia and Oceania Championship
- Appearances: 1 (first in 2023)
- Best result: 5th (2024)

International record (W–L–T)
- 2–2–0

The Kyrgyzstan women's national ice hockey team is the national women's ice hockey team of Kyrgyzstan. They are controlled by the Ice Hockey Federation of the Kyrgyz Republic and has been an associate member of the International Ice Hockey Federation (IIHF).

== History ==
Ice hockey has traditionally been regarded as a men's sport in Kyrgyzstan, with a women's team only being formed in 2020 when a group of schoolgirls established the team Shapak.

A national team was eventually formed and took part in the 2023 IIHF Women's Asia and Oceania Championship in Bangkok, Thailand. Kyrgyzstan finished seventh in its first women's tournament sanctioned by the International Ice Hockey Federation (IIHF).

== International competitions ==
=== Asia Cup ===
Year	Host	Result	Pld	W	OW	OL	L	GF	GA	GD
2023	(Thailand) Bangkok	7th place	4	2	0	0	2	4	30	-26
2024	(Kyrgyzstan) Bishkek	5th place	4	0	0	0	4	11	25	-14
2025	(United Arab Emirates) Al Ain	6th place	5	0	0	1	4	4	42	-38

== Rosters ==
=== 2023 ===
Source:

=== 2024 ===
Source:
