= Malaysia women's national ice hockey team =

- Association: Malaysia Ice Hockey Federation
- General manager: Ee Laine Chee
- Head coach: Nikolas Sepponen
- Captain: Illina Mohd Rothi
- Most points: Illina Mohd Rothi (5)
- Team colors
- IIHF code: MAS

First international
- Thailand 14–2 Malaysia (Taipei, Republic of China; 22 March 2016)

Biggest win
- Malaysia 5–0 India (Kuala Lumpur, Malaysia; 7 March 2018)

Biggest defeat
- Chinese Taipei 21–0 Malaysia (Taipei, Republic of China; 23 March 2016)

IIHF Women's Challenge Cup of Asia
- Appearances: 4 (first in 2016)
- Best result: 4th (2025)

International record (W–L–T)
- 1–3–0

The Malaysia women's national ice hockey team is the ice hockey team representing Malaysia internationally in women's competition. The team is overseen by the Malaysia Ice Hockey Federation, a member of the International Ice Hockey Federation. The team was formed in 2016 and currently competes in the IIHF Women's Challenge Cup of Asia Division I tournament.

== History ==
The Malaysia women's national ice hockey team played its first game in March 2016 at the 2016 IIHF Women's Challenge Cup of Asia Division I tournament. The team lost their first two games of the tournament, losing to Thailand 2–14 and Chinese Taipei 0–21. Their game against Chinese Taipei is currently their largest international loss. Malaysia recorded their first win in their third game of the tournament after they defeated India 6–3. The team lost their final game of the tournament against Singapore, finishing fourth in the standings.

== International competitions ==
- 2016 IIHF Women's Challenge Cup of Asia Division I. Finish: 4th (4th overall)
- 2017 IIHF Women's Challenge Cup of Asia. Finish: 7th
- 2018 IIHF Women's Challenge Cup of Asia Division I. Finish: 1st (5th overall)
- 2019 IIHF Women's Challenge Cup of Asia. Finish: 5th
- 2023 IIHF Women's Asia and Oceania Championship. Finish: 6th
- 2025 IIHF Women's Asia Cup. Finish: 4th

== Players and personnel ==
=== Team roster ===
For the 2016 IIHF Women's Challenge Cup of Asia Division I

#	Name	Pos	S/G	Age	Club
98	Anisah Sarah Azra	F	L	27	Jazura Girls
38	Jiamin Boon	F	R	32	University of London Dragons
28	Su Ying Chong	F	R	35	Jazura Girls
4	Inarah Haniff	F	R	27	Jazura Girls
5	Adilah Junid (A)	D	R	49	Jazura Girls
27	Nur Afshaa Mohd Ameeruddin	F	R	26	Jazura Girls
23	Illina Mohd Rothi (C)	D	L	38	Auckland
89	Ain Mohd Zaki	G	R	36	Jazura Girls
67	Nurul Ain Khadijah Mohd Zaki	D	R	26	Jazura Girls
16	Sofiah Nur Aziz	D	R	27	Jazura Girls
12	Aisha Nuval Othman	F	L	29	Jazura Girls
11	Alyaa Nuval Othman	F	L	29	Jazura Girls
88	Nabilah Shaharudin	F	R	35	Jazura Girls
78	Azuma Tg Abdillah	G	L	47	Jazura Girls
71	Zoe Ungku Fa Iz	F	R	28	Jazura Girls
19	Nora Versluis	D	R	30	Jazura Girls
8	Mei Wah Wan	F	L	32	Jazura Girls
77	Wei Leng Young	F	R	33	Jazura Girls
20	Yasmin Zainol Kamal (A)	F	L	39	Jazura Girls

=== Team staff ===
For the 2016 IIHF Women's Challenge Cup of Asia Division I

- Head coach: Nikolas Sepponen
- General manager: Ee Laine Chee
- Team leader: Nurhidayah Badaruddin
- Team staff: Haniff Mahmood
- Equipment manager: Mohd Hafis Anjam
- Physiotherapist: Nurdiasafra Hassan
