= Singapore women's national ice hockey team =

National women's ice hockey team

Singapore
- Association: Singapore Ice Hockey Association
- Head coach: Karl Zimmermann
- Captain: Tiffany Yeoh
- Top scorer: Emily Kwek (38)
- Most points: Lin Wen Lim (22)
- Home stadium: Lin Wen Lim (32)
- IIHF code: SGP

Ranking
- Current IIHF: 45 (3 June 2026)

First international
- Hong Kong 7–1 Singapore (Hong Kong; 26 December 2013)

Biggest win
- Singapore 16–2 United Arab Emirates (Bangkok, Thailand; 9 March 2017)

Biggest defeat
- Chinese Taipei 15–1 Singapore (Taipei, Taiwan; 25 March 2016)

World Championships
- Appearances: 3 (first in 2024)
- Best result: 44th (2024)

International record (W–L–T)
- 14–25–0

The Singapore women's national ice hockey team is the women's national ice hockey team in Singapore.

== History ==
In the 2019 IIHF Women's Challenge Cup of Asia, the team finished third behind Thailand and Chinese Taipei. Wasunun Angkulpattanasuk of Thailand finished as the tournaments leading goaltender with a save percentage of 93.62 however the IIHF Directorate named Singapore's Qina Foo as the best goaltender.

== Tournament record ==
=== World Championships ===
- 2024 – 44th place (4th in IIIB)
- 2025 – 45th place (5th in IIIB)
- 2026 – 46th place (6th in IIIB)

=== Other competitions ===
- 2014 IIHF Women's Challenge Cup of Asia Division I – 3rd place(7th overall)
- 2016 IIHF Women's Challenge Cup of Asia Division I – 3rd place(3rd overall)
- 2017 IIHF Women's Challenge Cup of Asia – 3rd place
- 2018 IIHF Women's Challenge Cup of Asia – 4th place
- 2019 IIHF Women's Challenge Cup of Asia – 3rd place

== All-time record against other nations ==
Last match update: 18 March 2022

Key
Positive balance (more Wins)
Neutral balance (Wins = Losses)
Negative balance (more Losses)

Team	GP	W	T	L	GF	GA
Malaysia	3	3	0	0	13	4
United Arab Emirates	2	2	0	0	23	8
India	2	2	0	0	17	2
Philippines	1	1	0	0	6	2
Hong Kong	1	0	0	1	1	7
Chinese Taipei	2	0	0	2	2	18
Thailand	5	0	0	5	7	40
Total	16	8	0	8	69	81
