= Thailand women's national ice hockey team =

Thailand
- Association: Ice Hockey Association of Thailand
- General manager: Numchai Rattanapongbundit
- Head coach: Kritsana Promdirat
- Captain: Suwipa Panyamaneerat
- Most games: Sirikam Jittresin (47)
- Top scorer: Nuchanat Ponglerkdee (72)
- Most points: Nuchanat Ponglerkdee (112)
- IIHF code: THA

Ranking
- Current IIHF: 44 (3 June 2026)

First international
- Thailand 12–0 United Arab Emirates (Hong Kong, China; 26 December 2013)

Biggest win
- Thailand 21–1 Philippines (Bangkok, Thailand; 7 March 2017)

Biggest defeat
- Japan 37–0 Thailand (Sapporo, Japan; 23 February 2017)

World Championships
- Appearances: 3 (first in 2024)
- Best result: 34th (2025)

International record (W–L–T)
- 34–15–1

The Thailand women's national ice hockey team is the women's national ice hockey team in Thailand.

== Tournament record ==
=== World Championships ===
- 2024 – 41st place (1st in Division IIIB)
- 2025 – 34th place (2nd in Division IIIA)
- 2026 – 36th place (2nd in Division IIIA)

=== Asian Winter Games ===
- 2017 Asian Winter Games – 5th place
- 2025 – 6th place

=== IIHF Challenge Cup of Asia ===
- 2014 – 2nd place
- 2015 – 2nd place
- 2016 – 2nd place
- 2017 – 2nd place
- 2018 – 3rd place
- 2019 – 1st place
- 2023 – 1st place

=== SEA Games ===
- 2025 – 1st place

== All-time record against other nations ==
Last match update: 10 March 2022

Key
Positive balance (more Wins)
Neutral balance (Wins = Losses)
Negative balance (more Losses)

Team	GP	W	T	L	GF	GA
Singapore	5	5	0	0	40	7
Malaysia	3	3	0	0	39	5
India	2	2	0	0	32	2
United Arab Emirates	2	2	0	0	29	1
Philippines	1	1	0	0	21	1
Hong Kong	2	1	0	1	5	8
Chinese Taipei	2	1	0	1	3	11
Kazakhstan	1	0	0	1	0	8
China	1	0	0	1	0	15
South Korea	1	0	0	1	0	20
Japan	1	0	0	1	0	37
Total	21	15	0	6	169	115
