= United Arab Emirates women's national ice hockey team =

United Arab Emirates
- Association: UAE Winter Sports Federation
- General manager: Hamel Al-Qubaisi
- Head coach: Siarhei Bialou
- Assistants: Laura Cortez
- Captain: Fatema al-Qubaisi
- Top scorer: Dana Al Hosani (19)
- Most points: Dana Al Hosani (20)
- Home stadium: Zayed Sports City Ice Rink
- Team colors
- IIHF code: UAE

First international
- Thailand 12 – 0 United Arab Emirates (Hong Kong, China; December 26, 2013)

Biggest win
- United Arab Emirates 13 – 0 Kuwait (Abu Dhabi, United Arab Emirates; April 16, 2019)

Biggest defeat
- Thailand 17 – 1 United Arab Emirates (Bangkok, Thailand; March 11, 2017); Iran 16 – 0 United Arab Emirates (Bishkek, Kyrgyzstan; March 24, 2024)

International record (W–L–T)
- 5–9–0

The United Arab Emirates women's national ice hockey team (Arabic: فريق هوكي الجليد الإماراتي للسيدات) is the women's national ice hockey team in United Arab Emirates.

== History ==
In February 2018, the team embarked on an International trip to the United States. Their journey began in Washington DC where the team met the Washington Capitals. Their second stop was Chicago, IL. In Chicago the team watched two Blackhawks games, toured the locker rooms, and performed charity work for the community by training the youth players. Fatma Mustapha suffered an injury to the head due to a puck being shot; she did not require stitches and recovered quite fast. From Chicago, they visited Ontario. Upon arrival in Ontario the team had dinner with the UAE Ambassador to Canada.

October- November, 2018. The team travelled to Bangkok to participate in the Land of Smiles Tournament. The result was more of a learning curve than a championship title.

== International competitions ==
=== IIHF Women's Challenge Cup of Asia ===
- 2014 IIHF Women's Challenge Cup of Asia. Finish: 4th in Division I (8th overall)
- 2017 IIHF Women's Challenge Cup of Asia. Finish: 6th in Top Division
- 2018 IIHF Women's Challenge Cup of Asia. Finish: 2nd in Division I (6th overall)
- 2019 IIHF Women's Challenge Cup of Asia. Finish: 2nd in Division I (7th overall)

=== IIHF Women's Development Cup ===
Year	Host	Result	Pld	W	T	L
2022	Kuwait City	4th place	5	2	0	3
Total		1/1	5	2	0	3

== Roster ==
Roster for the UAE Women's National Team.

Goaltenders
#	Player	Catches	Height	Weight	Date of birth	Club
1	Fatima Al Karashi	L			27 March 1980 (age 46)	(United Arab Emirates) Abu Dhabi ISC
20	Maryam Al Shehi	L			21 February 2002 (age 24)	(United Arab Emirates) Abu Dhabi ISC
Defencemen
#	Player	Shoots	Height	Weight	Date of birth	Club
5	Fatma Mustapha	L	162 cm	69 kg	20 February 1992 (age 34)	(United Arab Emirates) Abu Dhabi ISC
8	Fatema Al-Qubaisi	R	166 cm	76 kg	14 February 1986 (age 40)	(United Arab Emirates) Abu Dhabi ISC
9	Maryam Al-Mazrouie	L	164 cm	70 kg	12 July 2001 (age 25)	(United Arab Emirates) Abu Dhabi ISC
13	Noura Bensammoud	R	160cm	94kg	26 September 1980 (age 46)	(United Arab Emirates) Abu Dhabi ISC
14	Muna Al-Dhaheri	R	149cm	74kg	23 May 1976 (age 50)	(United Arab Emirates) Abu Dhabi ISC
Forwards
#	Player	Shoots	Height	Weight	Date of birth	Club
4	Dana Al-Hosani	R	164 cm	51 kg	21 April 1991 (age 35)	(United Arab Emirates) Abu Dhabi ISC
6	Mariam Al-Amri	R	157 cm	75 kg	27 June 1991 (age 35)	(United Arab Emirates) Abu Dhabi ISC
7	Fatima Al-Ali	R	167 cm	52 kg	28 January 1990 (age 36)	(United Arab Emirates) Abu Dhabi ISC
10	Dana Al-Sabbagh	R	150cm	49kg	2 May 1995 (age 31)	(United Arab Emirates) Abu Dhabi ISC
11	Laura Cortez	R	151cm	60 kg	9 July 1981 (age 45)	(United Arab Emirates) Abu Dhabi ISC
12	Khulood Shugaa	R	155 cm	50 kg	9 December 1995 (age 30)	(United Arab Emirates) Abu Dhabi ISC
17	Fatima Al-Mazrouie	R	170 cm	85 kg	30 August 1994 (age 32)	(United Arab Emirates) Abu Dhabi ISC
22	Lateefa Al-Suwaidi	L	157 cm	62 kg	9 March 1995 (age 31)	(United Arab Emirates) Abu Dhabi ISC
24	Ebtisam Mebwana	R	153cm	64kg	26 June 1992 (age 34)	(United Arab Emirates) Abu Dhabi ISC

== Retired Players ==
Players
#	Player	Shoots/Catches	Position	Date of birth	Club
	Aisha Al Alawi	L	Defense woman	27 March 1980 (age 46)	(United Arab Emirates) Abu Dhabi ISC
	Alia Al Alawi	R	Goal Keeper	20 March 1986 (age 40)	(United Arab Emirates) Abu Dhabi ISC
	Sarah Habash	R	Defense woman	15 December 2000 (age 25)	(United Arab Emirates) Abu Dhabi ISC
