= 2014 IIHF U20 Challenge Cup of Asia =

Tournament details
- Host country: Russia
- Venue(s): 1 (in 1 host city)
- Dates: 4 August – 7 August 2014
- Teams: 4

Final positions
- Champions: (Russia) MHL Red Stars (2nd title)
- Runners-up: Kazakhstan
- Third place: Japan

Tournament statistics
- Games played: 6
- Goals scored: 49 (8.17 per game)
- Attendance: 3,222 (537 per game)

The 2014 IIHF U20 Challenge Cup of Asia was an international men's under-20 ice hockey tournament run by the International Ice Hockey Federation. The tournament took place between 4 August and 7 August 2014 in Yuzhno-Sakhalinsk, Russia and was the third edition held since its formation in 2012 under the IIHF Challenge Cup of Asia series of tournaments. The MHL Red Stars won the tournament after winning all three of their round-robin games and finishing first in the standings. The win was the MHL Red Stars second title having previously won in 2012. Kazakhstan finished in second place and Japan finished third.

== Overview ==
The 2014 IIHF U20 Challenge Cup of Asia began on 4 August 2014 in Yuzhno-Sakhalinsk, Russia with games played at Arena City. Japan, South Korea and Russia's MHL Red Stars all returned after competing in last years tournament, while Kazakhstan made their debut in the IIHF U20 Challenge Cup of Asia. The Red Stars team was made up of players from the MHL's Sakhalinskie Akuly club which is based Yuzhno-Sakhalinsk. Japan entered the tournament as the defending champion after claiming their first title in 2013.

The tournament consisted of a single round-robin with each team competing in three games. The MHL Red Stars won the tournament after winning all three of their games and finished first in the standings. The win gave the MHL Red Stars their second tournament title after previously winning in 2012. Kazakhstan finished second after losing only to the Red Stars and Japan finished third after managing only one win against South Korea. MHL Red Stars' Oleg Genze led the tournament in scoring with ten points and Nikita Ivandikov finished as the tournaments leading goaltender with a save percentage of 92.31.

== Standings ==
Team	Pld	W	OTW	OTL	L	GF	GA	GD	Pts
(Russia) MHL Red Stars	3	3	0	0	0	23	4	+19	9
Kazakhstan	3	2	0	0	1	9	7	+2	6
Japan	3	1	0	0	2	13	14	−1	3
South Korea	3	0	0	0	3	4	24	−20	0

== Fixtures ==
All times are local. (MAGT – UTC+11)

4 August 2014; 19:00	MHL Red Stars (Russia)	8 – 3 (2–1, 2–2, 4–0)	Japan	Arena City; Attendance: 563

Game reference
12 min	Penalties	20 min
40	Shots	28

5 August 2014; 19:00	Kazakhstan	4 – 2 (2–1, 1–0, 1–1)	South Korea	Arena City; Attendance: 521

Game reference
30 min	Penalties	22 min
41	Shots	19

6 August 2014; 15:30	Japan	2 – 4 (1–1, 0–2, 1–1)	Kazakhstan	Arena City; Attendance: 497

Game reference
12 min	Penalties	14 min
23	Shots	20

6 August 2014	MHL Red Stars (Russia)	12 – 0 (3–0, 4–0, 5–0)	South Korea	Arena City; Attendance: 556

Game reference
4 min	Penalties	10 min
53	Shots	4

7 August 2014; 15:30	Japan	8 – 2 (1–1, 3–1, 4–0)	South Korea	Arena City; Attendance: 512

Game reference
35 min	Penalties	12 min
41	Shots	20

7 August 2014; 19:00	MHL Red Stars (Russia)	3 – 1 (0–0, 1–1, 2–0)	Kazakhstan	Arena City; Attendance: 573

Game reference
16 min	Penalties	28 min
44	Shots	24

== Scoring leaders ==
List shows the top ten skaters sorted by points, then goals, assists, and the lower penalties in minutes.

Player (Team)	GP	G	A	Pts	+/-	PIM	POS
(Russia) Oleg Genze (MHL)	3	2	8	10	+9	2	F
(Russia) Vitali Timoshenko (MHL)	3	7	0	7	+5	4	F
(Japan) Yuri Terao (JPN)	3	2	5	7	0	8	F
(Slovakia) Vladimir Lukacik (MHL)	3	4	2	6	+7	0	D
(Russia) Nikita Pukhov (MHL)	3	3	3	6	+8	4	F
(Kazakhstan) Kirill Savitski (KAZ)	3	3	3	6	+4	14	F
(Kazakhstan) Yevgeni Korolinski (KAZ)	3	2	4	6	+4	0	F
(Russia) Andrei Petelin (MHL)	3	2	4	6	+9	4	F
(Japan) Yu Hikosaka (JPN)	3	3	2	5	+2	31	F
(Japan) Hayate Sakamoto (JPN)	3	1	4	5	+1	2	F
(Kazakhstan) Arkadi Shestakov (KAZ)	3	1	4	5	+4	2	F

== Leading goaltenders ==
Only the top goaltenders, based on save percentage, who have played at least 40% of their team's minutes are included in this list.

Player (Team)	MIP	SOG	GA	GAA	SVS%	SO
(Russia) Nikita Ivandikov (MHL)	120:00	52	4	2.00	92.31	0
(Kazakhstan) Valeri Sevidov (KAZ)	120:00	63	5	2.50	92.06	0
(Japan) Keisuke Maekita (JPN)	120:00	60	10	5.00	83.33	0
(South Korea) Back Seung Chan (KOR)	163:49	124	21	7.69	83.06	0
