= Alexander Kadeikin =

Russian ice hockey player (born 1993)

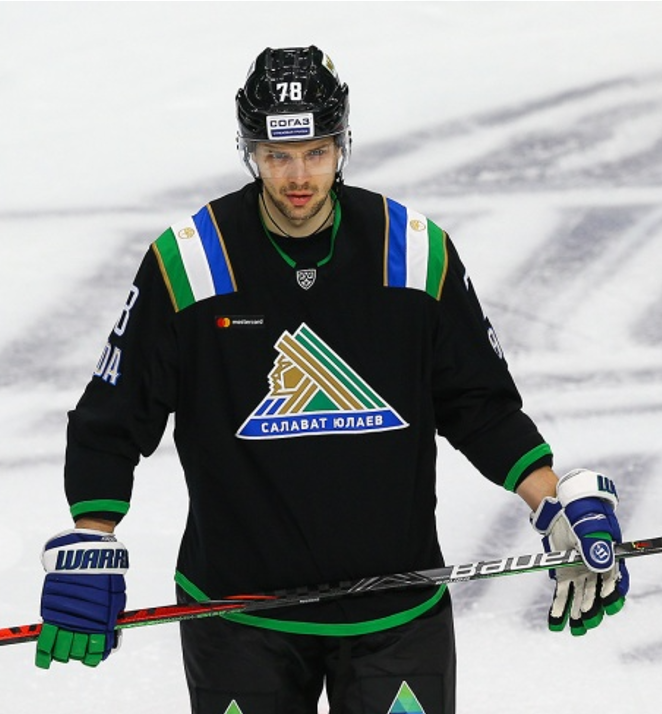
- Born: October 4, 1993 (age 32) Elektrostal, Russia
- Height: 6 ft 3 in (191 cm)
- Weight: 187 lb (85 kg; 13 st 5 lb)
- Position: Forward
- Shoots: Left
- KHL team Former teams: Avtomobilist Yekaterinburg; Atlant Moscow Oblast; SKA Saint Petersburg; Lokomotiv Yaroslavl; Salavat Yulaev Ufa; Traktor Chelyabinsk
- NHL draft: 201st overall, 2014; Detroit Red Wings
- Playing career: 2010–present

Alexander Kadeikin (born October 4, 1993) is a Russian professional ice hockey player, who is currently playing for Avtomobilist Yekaterinburg of the Kontinental Hockey League (KHL). Kadeikin was drafted 201st overall by the Detroit Red Wings in the 2014 NHL entry draft.

== Playing career ==
Kadeikin made his debut during the 2010–11 season for Mytischenskie Atlanty of the MHL. Kadeikin recorded ten goals and 19 assists in 48 games. During the 2011–12 season, in his second year with Mytischenskie Atlanty, Kadeikin recorded 22 goals and 36 assists in 60 games for

In the 2012–13 season, Kadeikin made his professional debut for Atlant Moscow Oblast, where he skated in two games. He also appeared in 26 games for their junior club, where he recorded 14 goals and 29 assists in 26 games.

During the 2013–14 season, Kadeikin was the team's leading scorer, recording eight goals and 15 assists in 54 games for Atlant Moscow Oblast.

In the following 2014–15 season, after registering 1 assist in 9 games with Atlant, Kadeikin was traded to SKA Saint Petersburg in exchange for Anton Malyshev on September 26, 2014.

On May 22, 2018, Kadeikin signed a one-year contract as a free agent with Salavat Yulaev Ufa to commence in the 2018–19 season.

Following five seasons with Salavat, due to financial difficulties within the club, Kadeikin left as a free agent before the 2023–24 season and returned to his former team, SKA Saint Petersburg, on a two-year deal on 1 May 2023.

With season remaining on his contract with SKA, Kadeikin left the club after one season in his return after he was released from his contract to sign a two-year contract with Traktor Chelyabinsk on 8 May 2024.

== International play ==
Medal record

Representing Russia

Ice hockey

IIHF U20 Challenge Cup of Asia
Gold medal – first place	2012 South Korea	

Kadeikin represented the MHL Red Stars at the 2012 IIHF U20 Challenge Cup of Asia, where he won a gold medal. Kadeikin was tied with Maxim Shalunov as the teams' leading scorer, recording four goals and ten assists in four games.

== Career statistics ==
=== Regular season and playoffs ===
			Regular season					Playoffs
Season	Team	League	GP	G	A	Pts	PIM	GP	G	A	Pts	PIM
2010–11	Mytishchinskie Atlanty	MHL	48	10	19	29	42	6	1	1	2	2
2011–12	Mytishchinskie Atlanty	MHL	60	22	36	58	20	12	7	9	16	22
2012–13	Mytishchinskie Atlanty	MHL	26	14	29	43	4	8	4	7	11	6
2012–13	Atlant Moscow Oblast	KHL	2	0	0	0	0	2	0	0	0	0
2013–14	Mytishchinskie Atlanty	MHL	1	1	0	1	2	3	0	3	3	2
2013–14	Atlant Moscow Oblast	KHL	54	8	15	23	24	—	—	—	—	—
2014–15	Atlant Moscow Oblast	KHL	9	0	1	1	2	—	—	—	—	—
2014–15	SKA Saint Petersburg	KHL	20	4	4	8	2	—	—	—	—	—
2015–16	SKA Saint Petersburg	KHL	48	5	6	11	14	4	0	0	0	0
2016–17	Lokomotiv Yaroslavl	KHL	41	7	8	15	19	15	2	2	4	10
2017–18	Lokomotiv Yaroslavl	KHL	44	7	3	10	14	5	0	2	2	2
2018–19	Salavat Yulaev Ufa	KHL	56	6	14	20	43	16	1	3	4	10
2019–20	Salavat Yulaev Ufa	KHL	59	11	18	29	49	6	0	3	3	6
2020–21	Salavat Yulaev Ufa	KHL	54	13	21	34	22	9	2	5	7	2
2021–22	Salavat Yulaev Ufa	KHL	43	11	20	31	18	11	5	4	9	4
2022–23	Salavat Yulaev Ufa	KHL	68	13	26	39	28	5	1	2	3	2
2023–24	SKA Saint Petersburg	KHL	45	2	12	14	14	9	1	2	3	0
2024–25	Traktor Chelyabinsk	KHL	67	25	21	46	16	21	4	8	12	2
2025–26	Traktor Chelyabinsk	KHL	68	13	20	33	40	5	1	1	2	0
KHL totals			678	125	189	314	305	108	17	32	49	38

=== International ===
Year	Team	Event	Result	GP	G	A	Pts	PIM
2012	Russia	CCOA	1st place, gold medalist(s)	4	4	10	14	0
Junior totals				4	4	10	14	0
