= IIHF Asia Cup =

International ice hockey tournament in Asia

- Sport: Ice hockey
- Founded: 2008
- Most recent champions: Men: Mongolia (2nd title); Women: Philippines (1st title); U20 Men: Malaysia (2nd title); U18 Men: Uzbekistan (3rd title)
- Most titles: Men: Chinese Taipei (6 titles); Women: China, Japan & Thailand (2 titles each); U20 Men: Japan (3 titles); U18 Men: Uzbekistan (3 titles)
- Website: IIHF.com

The IIHF Asia Cup (formerly IIHF Challenge Cup of Asia, IIHF Asia and Oceania Championship, or Asia and Oceania Cup) are a series of international ice hockey tournaments. The purpose of the tournament is to provide competitive opportunities for Asia and Oceania teams, especially those in the lowest division of the IIHF World Championships, or the IIHF Development Cup. The first edition was held in Hong Kong from 24 to 26 April 2008, with the second edition held a year later in the United Arab Emirates. The third edition took place from 29 March to 4 April 2010 in the Republic of China.

The first women's tournament took place in Shanghai, China from 10 to 14 April 2010, and the first University Challenge Cup of Asia took place in Goyang-Si, Seoul, South Korea from 12 to 14 May 2010. Junior (under-20) and under-18 editions were introduced in 2012. On 31 January 2020, the women's and men's under-20 tournaments were cancelled, except the men's tournament, due to the COVID-19 pandemic. The competition was renamed to the IIHF Asia and Oceania Championship starting with the 2022 season.

== Results ==
=== Men ===
#	Year	(gold) Gold	(silver) Silver	(bronze) Bronze	Host city	Host country
1	2008	Chinese Taipei (1)	Malaysia (1)	Hong Kong (1)	Hong Kong	Hong Kong
2	2009	United Arab Emirates (1)	Thailand (1)	Malaysia (1)	Abu Dhabi	United Arab Emirates
3	2010	Chinese Taipei (2)	United Arab Emirates (1)	Thailand (1)	Taipei City	Taiwan
4	2011	Hong Kong (1)	United Arab Emirates (2)	Thailand (2)	Kuwait City	Kuwait
5	2012	United Arab Emirates (2)	Thailand (2)	Malaysia (2)	Dehradun	India
6	2013	Chinese Taipei (3)	Hong Kong (1)	Mongolia (1)	Bangkok	Thailand
7	2014	Chinese Taipei (4)	United Arab Emirates (3)	Mongolia (2)	Abu Dhabi	United Arab Emirates
8	2015	Chinese Taipei (5)	United Arab Emirates (4)	Mongolia (3)	Taipei City	Taiwan
9	2016	Chinese Taipei (6)	United Arab Emirates (5)	Mongolia (4)	Abu Dhabi	United Arab Emirates
10	2017	United Arab Emirates (3)	Mongolia (1)	Thailand (3)	Bangkok	Thailand
11	2018	Mongolia (1)	Thailand (3)	Philippines (1)	Pasay	Philippines
12	2019	Mongolia (2)	Philippines (1)	Singapore (1)	Kuala Lumpur	Malaysia
—	2020	Tournament cancelled due to the COVID-19 pandemic			Singapore	Singapore

=== Men, Division I ===
#	Year	(gold) Gold	(silver) Silver	(bronze) Bronze	Host city	Host country
1	2014	Macau (1)	Kyrgyzstan (1)	Singapore (1)	Bishkek	Kyrgyzstan
2	2015	Kuwait (1)	Singapore (1)	Kyrgyzstan (1)	Kuwait City	Kuwait
3	2016	Kyrgyzstan (1)	Malaysia (1)	Macau (1)	Bishkek	Kyrgyzstan
4	2017	Kuwait (2)	India (1)	Oman (1)	Kuwait City	Kuwait
5	2018	Malaysia (1)	Macau (1)	Indonesia (1)	Kuala Lumpur	Malaysia

=== Women ===
#	Year	(gold) Gold	(silver) Silver	(bronze) Bronze	Host city	Host country
1	2010	China 1 (1)	Japan (1)	North Korea (1)	Shanghai	China
2	2011	Japan (1)	China (1)	South Korea (1)	Nikko	Japan
3	2012	Japan (2)	China 1 (2)	China 2 (1)	Qiqihar	China
4	2014	China (2)	North Korea (1)	South Korea (2)	Harbin	China
5	2017	New Zealand U18 (1)	Thailand (1)	Singapore (1)	Bangkok	Thailand
6	2018	Chinese Taipei U18 (1)	New Zealand U18 (1)	Thailand (1)	Kuala Lumpur	Malaysia
7	2019	Thailand (1)	Chinese Taipei (1)	Singapore (2)	Abu Dhabi	United Arab Emirates
—	2020	Tournament cancelled due to the COVID-19 pandemic			Manila	Philippines
8	2023	Thailand (2)	Iran (1)	Singapore (3)	Bangkok	Thailand
9	2024	Iran (1)	Philippines (1)	United Arab Emirates (1)	Bishkek	Kyrgyzstan
10	2025	Philippines (1)	Iran (2)	India (1)	Al Ain	United Arab Emirates

=== Women, Division I ===
#	Year	(gold) Gold	(silver) Silver	(bronze) Bronze	Host city	Host country
1	2014	Hong Kong (1)	Thailand (1)	Singapore (1)	Hong Kong	Hong Kong
2	2015	Chinese Taipei (1)	Thailand (2)	Hong Kong (1)	Taipei City	Taiwan
3	2016	Chinese Taipei (2)	Thailand (3)	Singapore (2)	Taipei City	Taiwan
4	2018	Malaysia (1)	United Arab Emirates (1)	Philippines (1)	Kuala Lumpur	Malaysia
5	2019	Philippines (1)	United Arab Emirates (2)	India (1)	Abu Dhabi	United Arab Emirates
—	2020	Tournament cancelled due to the COVID-19 pandemic			Manila	Philippines

=== U20 Men ===
#	Year	(gold) Gold	(silver) Silver	(bronze) Bronze	Host city	Host country
1	2010	Japan (1)	South Korea (1)	China (1)	Seoul	South Korea
2	2011	Japan (2)	South Korea (2)	China (2)	Changchun	China
3	2012	MHL Red Stars (1)	Japan (1)	South Korea (1)	Seoul	South Korea
4	2013	Japan (3)	MHL Red Stars (1)	South Korea (2)	Khabarovsk	Russia
5	2014	MHL Red Stars (2)	Kazakhstan (1)	Japan (1)	Yuzhno-Sakhalinsk	Russia
6	2018	Malaysia (1)	Kyrgyzstan (1)	United Arab Emirates (1)	Kuala Lumpur	Malaysia
7	2019	Malaysia (2)	Kyrgyzstan (2)	Philippines (1)	Kuala Lumpur	Malaysia
—	2020	Tournament cancelled due to the COVID-19 pandemic			Bangkok	Thailand
8	2022	Thailand (1)	Singapore (1)	Hong Kong (1)	Bangkok	Thailand

=== U20 Men, Division I ===
#	Year	(gold) Gold	(silver) Silver	(bronze) Bronze	Host city	Host country
1	2019	Thailand (1)	Mongolia (1)	Indonesia (1)	Kuala Lumpur	Malaysia
—	2020	Tournament cancelled due to the COVID-19 pandemic			Bangkok	Thailand

=== U18 Men ===
#	Year	(gold) Gold	(silver) Silver	(bronze) Bronze	Host city	Host country
1	2012	Thailand (1)	United Arab Emirates (1)	Malaysia (1)	Abu Dhabi	United Arab Emirates
2	2023	Uzbekistan (1)	Turkmenistan (1)	Mongolia (1)	Ulaanbaatar	Mongolia
3	2024	Uzbekistan (2)	Thailand (1)	Mongolia (2)	Tashkent, Samarkand	Uzbekistan
4	2026	Uzbekistan (3)	Kyrgyzstan (1)	Mongolia (3)	Bishkek	Kyrgyzstan

== Medals ==
=== Men ===
Rank	Nation	Gold	Silver	Bronze	Total
1	Chinese Taipei	6	0	0	6
2	United Arab Emirates	3	5	0	8
3	Mongolia	2	1	4	7
4	Hong Kong	1	1	1	3
5	Thailand	0	3	3	6
6	Malaysia	0	1	2	3
7	Philippines	0	1	1	2
8	Singapore	0	0	1	1
Totals (8 entries)		12	12	12	36

=== Women ===
Rank	Nation	Gold	Silver	Bronze	Total
1	China	2	2	1	5
2	Thailand	2	1	1	4
3	Japan	2	1	0	3
4	Iran	1	2	0	3
5	Chinese Taipei	1	1	0	2
5	New Zealand	1	1	0	2
5	Philippines	1	1	0	2
8	North Korea	0	1	1	2
9	Singapore	0	0	3	3
10	South Korea	0	0	2	2
11	India	0	0	1	1
11	United Arab Emirates	0	0	1	1
Totals (12 entries)		10	10	10	30

=== U20 Men ===
Rank	Nation	Gold	Silver	Bronze	Total
1	Japan	3	1	1	5
2	MHL Red Stars	2	1	0	3
3	Malaysia	2	0	0	2
4	Thailand	1	0	0	1
5	South Korea	0	2	2	4
6	Kyrgyzstan	0	2	0	2
7	Kazakhstan	0	1	0	1
7	Singapore	0	1	0	1
9	China	0	0	2	2
10	Hong Kong	0	0	1	1
10	Philippines	0	0	1	1
10	United Arab Emirates	0	0	1	1
Totals (12 entries)		8	8	8	24

=== U18 Men ===
Rank	Nation	Gold	Silver	Bronze	Total
1	Uzbekistan	3	0	0	3
2	Thailand	1	1	0	2
3	Kyrgyzstan	0	1	0	1
3	Turkmenistan	0	1	0	1
3	United Arab Emirates	0	1	0	1
6	Mongolia	0	0	3	3
7	Malaysia	0	0	1	1
Totals (7 entries)		4	4	4	12

== See also ==
- IIHF Asian Oceanic U18 Championships
- IIHF Asia Championship Series
