= 2011 IIHF University Challenge Cup of Asia =

Tournament details
- Host country: China
- Dates: May 19–22, 2011
- Teams: 4

Final positions
- Champions: Japan (2nd title)

Tournament statistics
- Games played: 8
- Goals scored: 83 (10.38 per game)
- Attendance: 1,600 (200 per game)

The 2011 IIHF University Challenge Cup of Asia was the second IIHF University Challenge Cup of Asia, an annual international ice hockey tournament held by the International Ice Hockey Federation (IIHF). It was held from May 19 to May 22, 2011 in Changchun, China. Japan won the tournament for the second year in a row after defeating South Korea in the gold medal game.

== Overview ==
The 2011 IIHF University Challenge Cup of Asia began on May 19, 2010 in Changchun, China. The tournament expanded to four teams with the inclusion of Chinese Taipei. The first game was played between South Korea and Chinese Taipei with South Korea winning the game 13–1. Japan won the tournament for the second year in a row after defeating South Korea in the gold medal game. South Korea finished in second place while China finished in third after defeating Chinese Taipei in the bronze medal game. Yokuto Takami of Japan was named the tournaments best forward, Hyunggon Cho of South Korea the tournaments best defenceman and Ren Yamaguchi of Japan the best goaltender.

== Standings ==
Pos	Team	Pld	W	D	L	GF	GA	GD	Pts
1	Japan	3	3	0	0	32	5	+27	9
2	South Korea	3	2	0	1	24	8	+16	6
3	China	3	1	0	2	9	20	−11	3
4	Chinese Taipei	3	0	0	3	5	37	−32	0

== Fixtures ==
May 19, 2011; 15:00	South Korea	13 – 1 (4-0, 6-0, 3-1)	Chinese Taipei	Fuao Ice Arena; Attendance: 200

Game reference

May 19, 2011; 19:00	China	0 – 10 (0-4, 0-4, 0-2)	Japan	Fuao Ice Arena; Attendance: 200

Game reference

May 20, 2011; 15:00	Japan	16 – 0 (5-0, 4-0, 7-0)	Chinese Taipei	Fuao Ice Arena; Attendance: 200

Game reference

May 20, 2011; 19:00	South Korea	6 – 1 (2-0, 4-1, 0-0)	China	Fuao Ice Arena; Attendance: 200

Game reference

May 21, 2011; 15:00	Chinese Taipei	4 – 8 (1-2, 0-5, 3-1)	China	Fuao Ice Arena; Attendance: 200

Game reference

May 21, 2011; 19:30	Japan	6 – 5 (1-1, 4-4, 1-0)	South Korea	Fuao Ice Arena; Attendance: 200

Game reference

=== Bronze medal game ===
May 22, 2011; 15:00	China	8 – 0 (2-0, 3-0, 3-0)	Chinese Taipei	Fuao Ice Arena; Attendance: 200

Game reference

=== Gold medal game ===
May 22, 2011; 19:30	Japan	3 – 2 (1-2, 2-0, 0-0)	South Korea	Fuao Ice Arena; Attendance: 200

Game reference
