= 2010 IIHF University Challenge Cup of Asia =

Tournament details
- Host country: South Korea
- Dates: May 12–14, 2011
- Teams: 3

Final positions
- Champions: Japan (1st title)

Tournament statistics
- Games played: 3
- Goals scored: 32 (10.67 per game)

The 2010 IIHF University Challenge Cup of Asia was the first playing of the university section of the IIHF Challenge Cup of Asia. It was held from May 12 to May 14, 2010, in Seoul, South Korea. Japan won the tournament after winning both of their games and finishing on top of the standings.

== Overview ==
The 2010 IIHF University Challenge Cup of Asia began on May 12, 2010 in Seoul, South Korea. The first game was played between hosts South Korea and China with South Korea winning the game 4–3. Japan won the tournament after winning both their games against China and South Korea. South Korea finished second with three points while China finished third after losing both of their games. Young June Lee of South Korea was named the tournaments best forward, Li Jian of China the tournaments best defenceman and Sung Je Park of South Korea the best goaltender.

== Standings ==
Pos	Team	Pld	W	OTW	OTL	L	GF	GA	GD	Pts
1	Japan	2	2	0	0	0	20	5	+15	6
2	South Korea	2	1	0	0	1	8	8	0	3
3	China	2	0	0	0	2	4	19	−15	0

== Fixtures ==
May 12, 2010; 13:30	South Korea	4–3	China	Goyang Sports Complex

Game reference

May 13, 2010; 13:30	China	1–15	Japan	Goyang Sports Complex

Game reference

May 14, 2010; 13:15	South Korea	4–5	Japan	Goyang Sports Complex

Game reference
