= 2013 IIHF U20 Challenge Cup of Asia =

Tournament details
- Host country: Russia
- Dates: 7 – 9 June 2013
- Teams: 3

Final positions
- Champions: Japan (1st title)
- Runner-up: (Russia) MHL Red Stars
- Third place: South Korea

Tournament statistics
- Games played: 3
- Goals scored: 25 (8.33 per game)

The 2013 IIHF U20 Challenge Cup of Asia was the second IIHF U20 Challenge Cup of Asia, an annual international ice hockey tournament held by the International Ice Hockey Federation (IIHF). It took place between 7 and 9 June 2013 in Khabarovsk, Russia. Japan won the tournament after winning both of their round robin games and finishing first in the standings. Russia, represented by the MHL Red Stars, finished second and South Korea finished in third place.

== Standings ==
Pos	Team	Pld	W	OTW	OTL	L	GF	GA	GD	Pts
1	Japan	2	2	0	0	0	15	6	+9	6
2	(Russia) MHL Red Stars	2	1	0	0	1	8	6	+2	3
3	South Korea	2	0	0	0	2	2	13	−11	0

== Fixtures ==
All times local.

7 June 2013; 19:00	(Russia) MHL Red Stars	4 – 0 (1–0, 0–0, 3–0)	South Korea	Platinum Arena

Game reference

8 June 2013; 15:00	South Korea	2 – 9 (0–4, 2–3, 0–2)	Japan	Platinum Arena

Game reference

9 June 2013; 15:00	Japan	6 – 4 (0–1, 3–2, 3–1)	(Russia) MHL Red Stars	Platinum Arena

Game reference
