= 2016 IIHF Women's Challenge Cup of Asia Division I =

Tournament details
- Host country: Taiwan
- Venue: 1 (in 1 host city)
- Dates: 22–26 March 2016
- Teams: 5

Final positions
- Champions: Chinese Taipei (2nd title)
- Runners-up: Thailand
- Third place: Singapore

Tournament statistics
- Games played: 10
- Goals scored: 123 (12.3 per game)
- Attendance: 2,849 (285 per game)

Awards
- MVP: (Thailand) Nuchanat Ponglerkdee

The 2016 IIHF Women's Challenge Cup of Asia Division I was an international women's ice hockey tournament run by the International Ice Hockey Federation. The tournament took place between 22 March and 26 March 2016 in Taipei, Taiwan and was the third edition held since its formation in 2013 under the IIHF Challenge Cup of Asia series of tournaments. Chinese Taipei won the tournament for the second year in a row after winning all four of their round robin games and finishing first in the standings. Thailand finished in second place and Singapore finished third.

== Overview ==
The 2016 IIHF Women's Challenge Cup of Asia Division I began on 22 March 2016 in Taipei, Taiwan with the games played at Annex Ice Rink. Chinese Taipei and Thailand both returned after competing in last years tournament while Hong Kong did not send a team after previously playing in 2014 and 2015. Singapore returned to the competition having last played in 2014 where they finished third and India and Malaysia made their debut appearance in Division I and in international competition.

Chinese Taipei won the tournament after winning all four of their games and finished first in the standings. The win gave Chinese Taipei their second Division I title after previously winning in 2015. Thailand finished second after losing only to Chinese Taipei and won their third Division I silver medal in a row. Singapore finished in third after losing to Chinese Taipei and Thailand and won their second bronze medal, having previously finished third in 2014. Malaysia, who was on debut, won their first international game with a 6–3 victory over India. Thailand's Nuchanat Ponglerkdee was named most valuable player of the tournament by the media. Hui-Chen Yeh of Chinese Taipei finished as the tournaments top scorer with 22 points and was named the tournaments best forward. India's Noor Jahan was named the best goaltender by the media and Sirikam Jittresin of Thailand won the best defenceman award. Chinese Taipei's Tzu-Ting Hsu finished as the tournaments leading goaltender with a save percentage of 94.44.

== Standings ==
Pos	Team	Pld	W	OTW	OTL	L	GF	GA	GD	Pts
1	Chinese Taipei	4	4	0	0	0	57	2	+55	12
2	Thailand	4	3	0	0	1	36	14	+22	9
3	Singapore	4	2	0	0	2	16	26	−10	6
4	Malaysia	4	1	0	0	3	9	42	−33	3
5	India	4	0	0	0	4	5	39	−34	0

Source: IIHF

== Fixtures ==
All times are local. (NST – UTC+8)

22 March 2016; 15:30	India	1 – 8 (0–2, 0–4, 1–2)	Singapore	Annex Ice Rink; Attendance: 100

Game reference
4 min	Penalties	6 min
15	Shots	45

22 March 2016; 19:00	Malaysia	2 – 14 (0–4, 1–3, 1–7)	Thailand	Annex Ice Rink; Attendance: 300

Game reference
4 min	Penalties	6 min
27	Shots	46

23 March 2016; 15:30	Chinese Taipei	21 – 0 (9–0, 4–0, 8–0)	Malaysia	Annex Ice Rink; Attendance: 526

Game reference
0 min	Penalties	20 min
74	Shots	4

23 March 2016; 19:00	Thailand	12 – 1 (3–0, 3–0, 6–1)	India	Annex Ice Rink; Attendance: 96

Game reference
4 min	Penalties	14 min
71	Shots	8

24 March 2016; 15:30	Thailand	9 – 3 (3–0, 3–2, 3–1)	Singapore	Annex Ice Rink; Attendance: 88

Game reference
8 min	Penalties	4 min
48	Shots	22

24 March 2016; 19:00	India	0 – 13 (0–2, 0–7, 0–4)	Chinese Taipei	Annex Ice Rink; Attendance: 149

Game reference
8 min	Penalties	4 min
4	Shots	67

25 March 2016; 15:30	Malaysia	6 – 3 (3–0, 2–3, 1–0)	India	Annex Ice Rink; Attendance: 79

Game reference
4 min	Penalties	4 min
58	Shots	24

25 March 2016; 19:00	Singapore	1 – 15 (0–8, 1–4, 0–3)	Chinese Taipei	Annex Ice Rink; Attendance: 521

Game reference
24 min	Penalties	2 min
8	Shots	68

26 March 2016; 15:30	Singapore	4 – 1 (0–0, 2–1, 2–0)	Malaysia	Annex Ice Rink; Attendance: 197

Game reference
22 min	Penalties	18 min
23	Shots	14

26 March 2016; 19:00	Chinese Taipei	8 – 1 (3–1, 3–0, 2–0)	Thailand	Annex Ice Rink; Attendance: 793

Game reference
0 min	Penalties	16 min
51	Shots	13

== Scoring leaders ==
List shows the top ten skaters sorted by points, then goals, assists, and the lower penalties in minutes.

Player	GP	G	A	Pts	+/-	PIM	POS
(Chinese Taipei) Hui-Chen Yeh	4	14	8	22	+23	0	F
(Thailand) Nuchanat Ponglerkdee	4	15	3	18	+23	16	F
(Chinese Taipei) Ting-Yu Hsu	4	8	7	15	+17	0	F
(Chinese Taipei) Chih-Lin Liu	4	5	8	13	+15	0	D
(Chinese Taipei) Yu-Ting Teng	4	4	8	12	+14	0	F
(Thailand) Kritsana Promdirat	4	6	5	11	+20	2	D
(Chinese Taipei) Chih-Chen Hsieh	4	5	4	9	+12	0	F
(Thailand) Sirikam Jittresin	4	4	5	9	+22	6	D
(Singapore) Emily Wei Wei Kwek	4	4	5	9	+3	8	F
(Thailand) Minsasha Teekhathanasakul	4	2	7	9	+18	0	F

== Leading goaltenders ==
Only the top five goaltenders, based on save percentage, who have played at least 40% of their team's minutes are included in this list.

Player	MIP	SOG	GA	GAA	SVS%	SO
(Chinese Taipei) Tzu-Ting Hsu	98:10	18	1	0.61	94.44	0
(Thailand) Wichaya Phangnga	182:13	97	13	4.28	86.60	0
(India) Noor Jahan	224:11	229	36	9.63	84.28	0
(Singapore) Caroline Leng Lee Ang	240:00	145	26	6.50	82.07	0
(Malaysia) Abdillah Azuma Tg	118:30	88	20	10.13	77.27	0

== See also ==
- List of sporting events in Taiwan
