= 2015 IIHF Women's Challenge Cup of Asia Division I =

Ice hockey tournament

Tournament details
- Host country: Taiwan
- Venue: 1 (in 1 host city)
- Dates: 6–7 November 2014
- Teams: 3

Final positions
- Champions: Chinese Taipei (1st title)
- Runners-up: Thailand
- Third place: Hong Kong

Tournament statistics
- Games played: 6
- Goals scored: 35 (5.83 per game)
- Attendance: 2,305 (384 per game)

The 2015 IIHF Women's Challenge Cup of Asia Division I was an international women's ice hockey tournament run by the International Ice Hockey Federation. The tournament took place between 6 November and 7 November 2014 in Taipei, Taiwan and was the second edition held since its formation in 2013 under the IIHF Challenge Cup of Asia series of tournaments. Chinese Taipei won the tournament after winning all four of their games and finishing first in the standings. Thailand finished in second place and Hong Kong finished third.

== Overview ==
The 2015 IIHF Women's Challenge Cup of Asia Division I began on 6 November 2014 in Taipei City, Taiwan, with the games played at Annex Ice Rink. Hong Kong and Thailand returned after competing in last years tournament and Chinese Taipei made their debut appearance in Division I and in international competition. Singapore and the United Arab Emirates did not send a team after previously competing in the 2014 edition.

Chinese Taipei won the tournament after winning all four of their games and finishing first in the standings. Thailand finished second with four points and claimed their second Division I silver medal. Last years winner, Hong Kong, finished in last place after managing only one shootout win against Thailand. Chinese Taipei's Hui-Chen Yeh finished as the tournaments top scorer with eight points and Tzu-Ting Hsu finished as the tournaments leading goaltender with a save percentage of 100.00.

== Standings ==
Pos	Team	Pld	W	OTW	OTL	L	GF	GA	GD	Pts
1	Chinese Taipei	4	4	0	0	0	24	2	+22	12
2	Thailand	4	1	0	1	2	7	14	−7	4
3	Hong Kong	4	0	1	0	3	4	19	−15	2

Source: IIHF

== Fixtures ==
All times are local. (NST – UTC+8)

6 November 2014; 09:00	Chinese Taipei	7 – 0 (1–0, 3–0, 3–0)	Hong Kong	Annex Ice Rink

Game reference

6 November 2014; 14:00	Chinese Taipei	3 – 1 (0–0, 2–0, 1–1)	Thailand	Annex Ice Rink

Game reference

6 November 2014; 19:00	Hong Kong	1 – 3 (1–1, 0–0, 0–2)	Thailand	Annex Ice Rink

Game reference

7 November 2014; 09:00	Thailand	1 – 7 (0–3, 0–3, 1–1)	Chinese Taipei	Annex Ice Rink

Game reference

7 November 2014; 14:00	Hong Kong	3 – 2 SO (1–2, 1–0, 0–0, 0–0, 1–0)	Thailand	Annex Ice Rink

Game reference

7 November 2014; 19:00	Chinese Taipei	7 – 0 (1–0, 3–0, 3–0)	Hong Kong	Annex Ice Rink

Game reference

== Scoring leaders ==
List shows the top ten skaters sorted by points, then goals, assists, and the lower penalties in minutes.

Player	GP	G	A	Pts	+/-	PIM	POS
(Chinese Taipei) Hui-Chen Yeh	4	5	3	8	+9	0	F
(Chinese Taipei) Chih-Lin Liu	4	4	2	6	+9	0	D
(Chinese Taipei) Min-Chun Huang	4	4	1	5	+9	0	D
(Thailand) Nuchanat Ponglerkdee	4	4	1	5	+5	4	F
(Chinese Taipei) An-Ting Liu	4	2	3	5	+8	2	F
(Chinese Taipei) Yen-Ling Lin	4	2	2	4	+6	0	D
(Chinese Taipei) Chih-Chen Hsieh	4	1	3	4	+7	0	F
(Chinese Taipei) Yih-Wen Lan	4	3	0	3	+4	0	F
(Chinese Taipei) Wan-Chih Yao	4	2	1	3	+5	0	F
(Chinese Taipei) Yi-Jun Tsai	4	1	2	3	+9	2	F
(Hong Kong) Tsui Yi Wong	4	1	2	3	-5	2	F

== Leading goaltenders ==
Only the top goaltenders, based on save percentage, who have played at least 40% of their team's minutes are included in this list.

Player	MIP	SOG	GA	GAA	SVS%	SO
(Chinese Taipei) Tzu-Ting Hsu	86:46	13	0	0.00	100.00	0
(Hong Kong) Jenny Kai Chin Lee	89:42	59	9	6.02	84.75	0
(Thailand) Wasunun Angkulpattanasuk	170:00	67	11	3.88	83.58	0
(Hong Kong) Ying Chi Virginia Wong	95:00	38	9	5.68	76.32	0

== See also ==
- List of sporting events in Taiwan
