= 2009 World Junior Ice Hockey Championships – Division II =

2009 IIHF U20 World Championship Division II
Tournament details
- Host countries: Romania; Spain
- Venues: 2 (in 2 host cities)
- Dates: 15–21 December 2008; 10–15 January 2009
- Teams: 12

The 2009 World Junior Ice Hockey Championship Division II was a pair of international ice hockey tournaments organized by the International Ice Hockey Federation. Division II represents the third level of the 2009 World Junior Ice Hockey Championships. 12 participating teams were divided into two groups, with Group A playing in Romania, and Group B playing in Spain. The winner of each group was promoted to Division I for the 2010 IIHF World Junior Championship, while the last-placed teams in each group were saved from relegation to Division III for the 2010 IIHF World Junior Championship due to 2009's Division III tournament being cancelled.

== Group A ==
The Group A tournament was played in Miercurea Ciuc, Romania, from 15 to 21 December 2008.

=== Participating teams ===
Team	Qualification
Lithuania	Placed 6th in Division I (Group A) last year and were relegated.
Japan	Placed 2nd in Division II (Group A) last year.
South Korea	Placed 3rd in Division II (Group A) last year.
Belgium	Placed 4th in Division II (Group A) last year.
Romania	Hosts; placed 5th in Division II (Group A) last year.
Serbia	Placed 2nd in Division III last year and were promoted.

=== Final standings ===
Pos	Team	Pld	W	OTW	OTL	L	GF	GA	GD	Pts	Promotion
1	Japan	5	4	0	0	1	45	11	+34	12	Promoted to the 2010 Division I
2	Lithuania	5	4	0	0	1	35	9	+26	12	
3	South Korea	5	2	2	0	1	19	18	+1	10	
4	Belgium	5	2	0	0	3	17	32	−15	6	
5	Serbia	5	0	1	1	3	10	33	−23	3	
6	Romania (H)	5	0	0	2	3	9	32	−23	2	

Source: IIHF
(H) Host

=== Match results ===
All times are local (Eastern European Time – UTC+2).

15 December 2008; 13:30	South Korea	1–4 (0–2, 1–0, 0–2)	Lithuania	Lajos Vákár Ice Hall, Miercurea Ciuc; Attendance: 75

Game reference

Hyun Ho Hwang
Goalies
Ernestas Kielius
Referee:
(Slovakia) Karol Popovic
Linesmen:
(France) Benjamin Gremion
(Romania) Marius Iliescu

	0–1	03:21 – Kumeliauskas (Verenis) (PP)
	0–2	04:22 – Kumeliauskas (Nekrasevicius) (PP)
Kwak (T.H. Park, S.J. Park) (PP) – 29:23	1–2
	1–3	55:20 – Kumeliauskas (Nekrasevicius, Verenis) (SH)
	1–4	59:51 – Rulevičius (ENG)

20 min
Penalties
28 min
25
Shots
41

15 December 2008; 17:00	Serbia	2–6 (1–2, 1–1, 0–3)	Belgium	Lajos Vákár Ice Hall, Miercurea Ciuc; Attendance: 70

Game reference

Zvezdan Vidakovic
Goalies
Arthur Legrand
Referee:
(Italy) Claudio Pianezze
Linesmen:
(Romania) Istvan Mathe
(Hungary) Attila Nagy

Ogrizović (Varga) – 00:11	1–0
	1–1	05:52 – Cornelis (Rondia, Abé)
	1–2	18:13 – van de Locht (PP)
	1–3	25:01 – Kolodziejczyk (SH)
Vučurević (Brkusanin) (PP) – 35:23	2–3
	2–4	44:52 – Campo (Vercammen)
	2–5	46:26 – Kolodziejczyk (Camelbeeck)
	2–6	49:27 – Campo (van de Locht)

16 min
Penalties
14 min
26
Shots
26

15 December 2008; 20:30	Japan	12–0 (1–0, 3–0, 8–0)	Romania	Lajos Vákár Ice Hall, Miercurea Ciuc

Game reference

16 December 2008; 13:30	Lithuania	9–1 (2–0, 2–1, 5–0)	Belgium	Lajos Vákár Ice Hall, Miercurea Ciuc

Game reference

16 December 2008; 17:00	Japan	4–5 (1–1, 1–3, 2–1)	South Korea	Lajos Vákár Ice Hall, Miercurea Ciuc

Game reference

16 December 2008; 20:30	Romania	2–3 OT (0–1, 1–1, 1–0) (0–1)	Serbia	Lajos Vákár Ice Hall, Miercurea Ciuc

Game reference

18 December 2008; 13:30	Japan	11–1 (4–0, 3–1, 4–0)	Serbia	Lajos Vákár Ice Hall, Miercurea Ciuc

Game reference

18 December 2008; 17:00	South Korea	5–4 (0–1, 3–2, 2–1)	Belgium	Lajos Vákár Ice Hall, Miercurea Ciuc

Game reference

18 December 2008; 20:30	Lithuania	8–1 (2–1, 4–0, 2–0)	Romania	Lajos Vákár Ice Hall, Miercurea Ciuc

Game reference

19 December 2008; 13:30	Belgium	1–13 (0–3, 0–5, 1–5)	Japan	Lajos Vákár Ice Hall, Miercurea Ciuc

Game reference

19 December 2008; 17:00	Serbia	1–10 (0–3, 1–3, 0–4)	Lithuania	Lajos Vákár Ice Hall, Miercurea Ciuc

Game reference

19 December 2008; 20:30	Romania	3–4 GWS (2–1, 1–1, 0–1) (0–0, 0–1)	South Korea	Lajos Vákár Ice Hall, Miercurea Ciuc

Game reference

21 December 2008; 13:30	South Korea	4–3 GWS (1–2, 0–1, 2–0) (0–0, 1–0)	Serbia	Lajos Vákár Ice Hall, Miercurea Ciuc

Game reference

21 December 2008; 17:00	Lithuania	4–5 (1–3, 1–0, 2–2)	Japan	Lajos Vákár Ice Hall, Miercurea Ciuc

Game reference

21 December 2008; 20:30	Belgium	5–3 (2–2, 2–0, 1–1)	Romania	Lajos Vákár Ice Hall, Miercurea Ciuc

Game reference

== Group B ==
The Group B tournament was played in Logroño, Spain, from 10 to 15 January 2009.

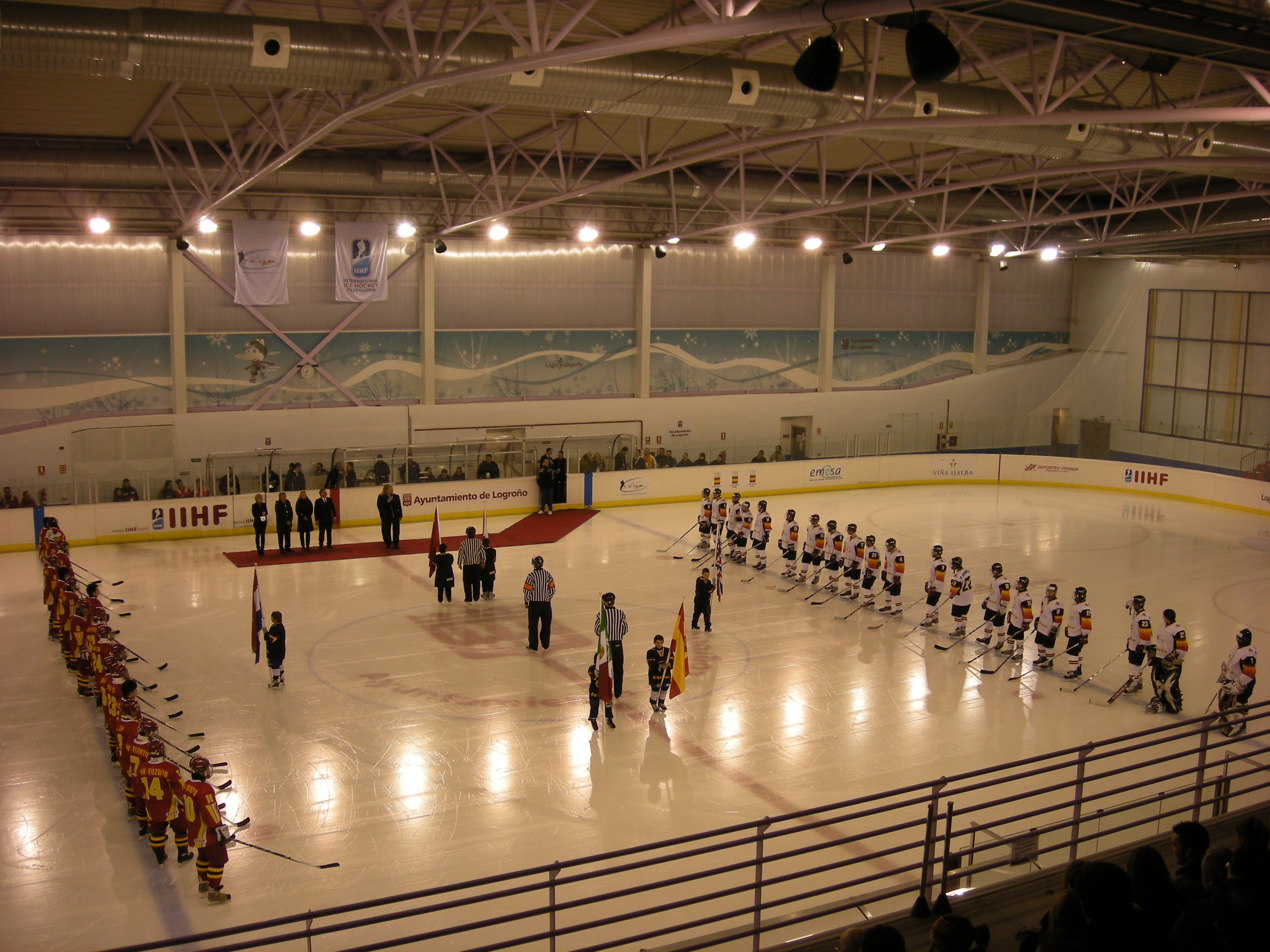
Opening ceremony in Logroño, La Rioja, Spain

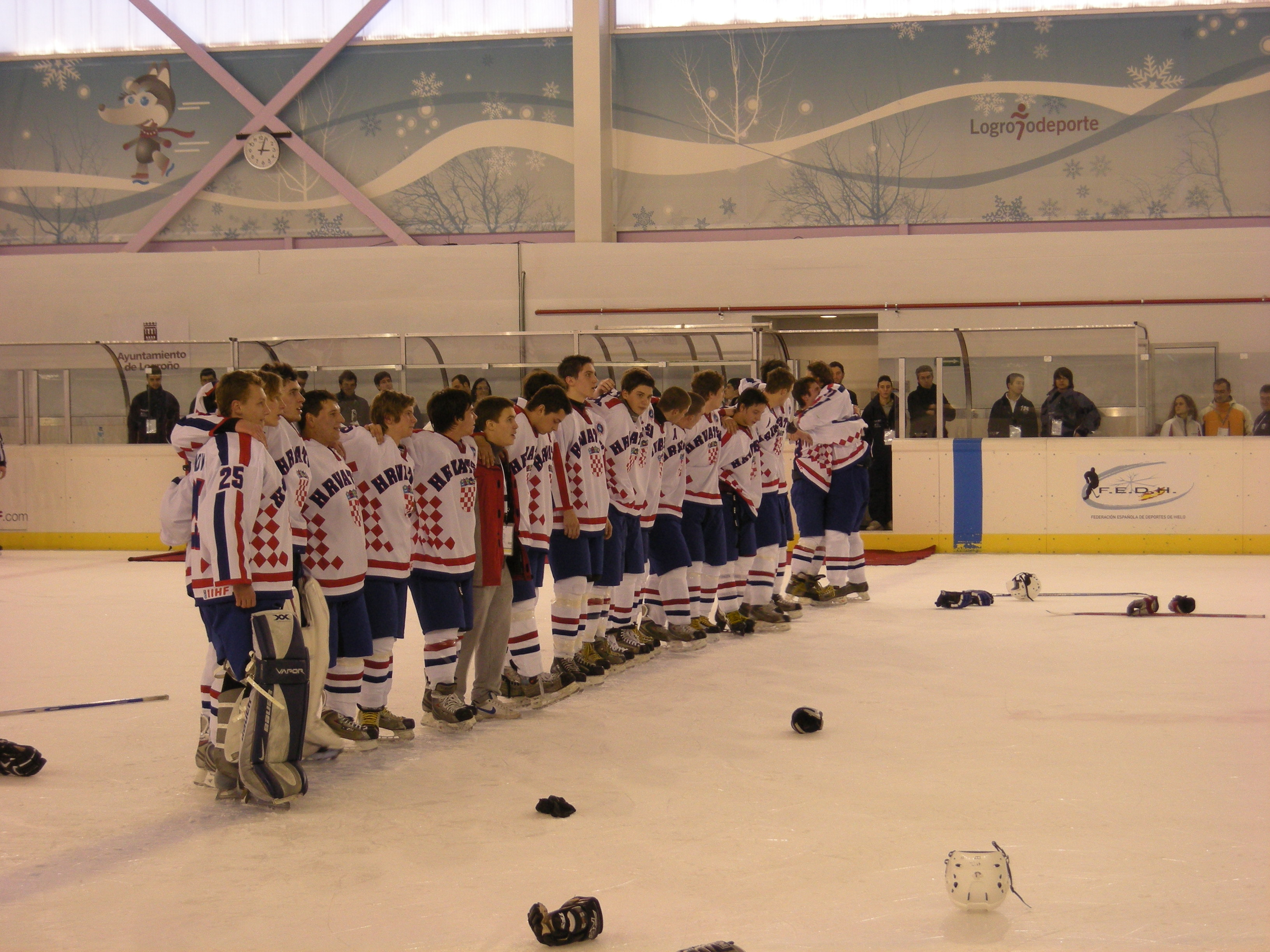
Croatian national team, winners of Group B

=== Participating teams ===
Team	Qualification
Great Britain	Placed 6th in Division I (Group B) last year and were relegated.
Netherlands	Placed 2nd in Division II (Group B) last year.
Croatia	Placed 3rd in Division II (Group B) last year.
Spain	Hosts; placed 4th in Division II (Group B) last year.
Mexico	Placed 5th in Division II (Group B) last year.
China	Placed 6th in Division II (Group B) last year.*

* Note: China, though demoted last year, took New Zealand's place in this tournament because of financing issues with the NZ team's travel.

=== Final standings ===
Pos	Team	Pld	W	OTW	OTL	L	GF	GA	GD	Pts	Promotion
1	Croatia	5	5	0	0	0	34	15	+19	15	Promoted to the 2010 Division I
2	Great Britain	5	4	0	0	1	29	10	+19	12	
3	Netherlands	5	3	0	0	2	28	12	+16	9	
4	Mexico	5	2	0	0	3	11	27	−16	6	
5	Spain (H)	5	1	0	0	4	12	19	−7	3	
6	China	5	0	0	0	5	9	40	−31	0	

Source: IIHF
(H) Host

=== Match results ===
All times are local (Central European Time – UTC+1).

10 January 2009; 13:00	Croatia	3–2 (2–0, 0–0, 1–2)	Great Britain	Logroño Arena, Logroño

Game reference

10 January 2009; 16:30	Netherlands	7–1 (4–1, 2–0, 1–0)	Mexico	Logroño Arena, Logroño

Game reference

10 January 2009; 20:30	China	1–5 (1–2, 0–3, 0–0)	Spain	Logroño Arena, Logroño

Game reference

11 January 2009; 13:00	Netherlands	3–4 (1–2, 2–1, 0–1)	Croatia	Logroño Arena, Logroño

Game reference

11 January 2009; 16:30	Mexico	4–2 (2–1, 0–0, 2–1)	China	Logroño Arena, Logroño

Game reference

11 January 2009; 20:00	Great Britain	6–0 (2–0, 2–0, 2–0)	Spain	Logroño Arena, Logroño

Game reference

12 January 2009; 13:00	Netherlands	10–0 (6–0, 2–0, 2–0)	China	Logroño Arena, Logroño

Game reference

12 January 2009; 16:30	Great Britain	7–1 (3–0, 3–1, 1–0)	Mexico	Logroño Arena, Logroño

Game reference

12 January 2009; 20:00	Croatia	5–4 (1–1, 2–2, 2–1)	Spain	Logroño Arena, Logroño

Game reference

14 January 2009; 13:00	China	2–9 (0–3, 1–5, 1–1)	Great Britain	Logroño Arena, Logroño

Game reference

14 January 2009; 16:30	Mexico	2–10 (0–1, 0–4, 2–5)	Croatia	Logroño Arena, Logroño

Game reference

14 January 2009; 20:00	Spain	2–4 (1–0, 1–4, 0–0)	Netherlands	Logroño Arena, Logroño

Game reference

15 January 2009; 13:00	Croatia	12–4 (6–2, 2–2, 4–0)	China	Logroño Arena, Logroño

Game reference

15 January 2009; 16:30	Great Britain	5–4 (2–0, 2–2, 1–2)	Netherlands	Logroño Arena, Logroño

Game reference

15 January 2009; 20:00	Spain	1–3 (0–0, 0–1, 1–2)	Mexico	Logroño Arena, Logroño

Game reference

== See also ==
- 2009 World Junior Ice Hockey Championships
- 2009 World Junior Ice Hockey Championships – Division I
- 2009 World Junior Ice Hockey Championships – Division III
