= 2019 IIHF Women's Challenge Cup of Asia =

Tournament details
- Host country: United Arab Emirates
- City: Abu Dhabi
- Venue: 1 (in 1 host city)
- Dates: 14–19 April 2019
- Teams: 5

Final positions
- Champions: Thailand (1st title)
- Runners-up: Chinese Taipei
- Third place: Singapore
- Fourth place: New Zealand U18

Tournament statistics
- Games played: 10
- Goals scored: 67 (6.7 per game)
- Scoring leader: (Thailand) Nuchanat Ponglerkdee (11 points)

Awards
- MVP: (Thailand) Nuchanat Ponglerkdee

The 2019 IIHF Women's Challenge Cup of Asia was an international women's ice hockey tournament run by the International Ice Hockey Federation (IIHF). The tournament took place between 14 April and 19 April 2019 in Abu Dhabi, United Arab Emirates and was the seventh edition held since its formation in 2010 under the IIHF Challenge Cup of Asia series of tournaments. Thailand won the tournament after finishing first in the standings. Chinese Taipei finished in second place and Singapore finished third.

== Overview ==
The 2019 IIHF Women's Challenge Cup of Asia began on 14 April 2019 in Abu Dhabi, United Arab Emirates with games played at the Zayed Sports City Ice Rink. New Zealand's under-18 team (New Zealand U18), Singapore and Thailand returned after competing in last years tournament. The defending champions, Chinese Taipei's under-18 team, were replaced by the Chinese Taipei women's team and Malaysia joined after winning promotion at the 2018 Division I tournament. The tournament ran alongside the 2019 IIHF Women's Challenge Cup of Asia Division I competition with all games being held in Abu Dhabi.

The tournament consisted of a single round-robin with each team competing in four games. Thailand won the tournament after winning three games and recording an overtime loss to finish at the top of the standings. The win was Thailand's first gold medal of the competition having previously won silver in 2017 and bronze in 2018. Chinese Taipei finished second after losing only to Thailand and Singapore finished in third. Thailand's Nuchanat Ponglerkdee led the tournament in scoring with eleven points and was named the most valuable player. Su-Ting Tan of Chinese Taipei was named best forward and Thailand's Sirikarn Jittresin was named best defenceman. Wasunun Angkulpattanasuk of Thailand finished as the tournaments leading goaltender with a save percentage of 93.62 however the IIHF Directorate named Singapore's Qina Foo as the best goaltender.

== Standings ==
The final standings of the tournament.

Team	Pld	W	OTW	OTL	L	GF	GA	GD	Pts
Thailand	4	3	0	1	0	21	6	+15	10
Chinese Taipei	4	3	0	0	1	21	6	+15	9
Singapore	4	2	0	0	2	12	16	−4	6
New Zealand U18	4	1	1	0	2	7	8	−1	5
Malaysia	4	0	0	0	4	6	31	−25	0

Source: IIHF

== Fixtures ==
All times are local. (UAE Standard Time – UTC+4)

14 April 2019; 12:00	Thailand	3–2 (2–1, 1–0, 0–1)	Chinese Taipei	Attendance: 62

Game reference
16 min	Penalties	12 min
18	Shots	27

14 April 2019; 16:00	Singapore	5–2 (1–0, 2–1, 2–1)	New Zealand U18	Attendance: 58

Game reference
8 min	Penalties	4 min
21	Shots	10

15 April 2019; 16:00	Malaysia	2–5 (0–2, 0–2, 2–1)	Singapore	Attendance: 46

Game reference
10 min	Penalties	18 min
4	Shots	22

16 April 2019; 12:00	New Zealand U18	1–0 GWS (0–0, 0–0, 0–0) (SO: 1–0)	Thailand

Game reference
10 min	Penalties	14 min
12	Shots	23

16 April 2019; 16:00	Chinese Taipei	13–2 (5–1, 4–0, 4–1)	Malaysia	Attendance: 52

Game reference
18 min	Penalties	12 min
29	Shots	4

17 April 2019; 16:00	Singapore	1–3 (0–2, 0–1, 1–0)	Chinese Taipei	Attendance: 42

Game reference
2 min	Penalties	2 min
4	Shots	24

17 April 2019; 20:00	New Zealand U18	4–0 (1–0, 3–0, 0–0)	Malaysia

Game reference
16 min	Penalties	30 min
15	Shots	4

18 April 2019; 16:00	Thailand	9–1 (4–0, 3–1, 2–0)	Singapore

Game reference
2 min	Penalties	8 min
31	Shots	9

19 April 2019; 12:00	Malaysia	2–9 (0–4, 1–2, 1–3)	Thailand

Game reference
2 min	Penalties	6 min
6	Shots	31

19 April 2019; 16:00	Chinese Taipei	3–0 (2–0, 1–0, 0–0)	New Zealand U18	Attendance: 40

Game reference
2 min	Penalties	4 min
20	Shots	7

== Scoring leaders ==
List shows the top ten skaters sorted by points, then goals, assists, a greater plus-minus, and then lower penalties in minutes.

Player (Team)	GP	G	A	Pts	+/–	PIM	POS
(Thailand) Nuchanat Ponglerkdee (THA)	4	6	5	11	+9	4	F
(Chinese Taipei) Tan Su-Ting (TPE)	4	8	1	9	+11	4	F
(Chinese Taipei) Ho Ping-Hsiang (TPE)	4	4	4	8	+8	0	F
(Thailand) Minsasha Teekhathanasakul (THA)	4	2	6	8	+10	4	F
(Chinese Taipei) Wu Fang-Chi (TPE)	4	1	7	8	+6	2	F
(Singapore) Elizabeth Chia (SGP)	4	4	3	7	+3	2	F
(Chinese Taipei) Liu Pei-Chen (TPE)	4	4	1	5	+6	14	F
(Singapore) Tiffany Ong (SGP)	4	1	4	5	+6	0	F
(New Zealand) Amber Metcalfe (NZL)	4	4	0	4	0	2	F
(Thailand) Varachanant Boonyubol (THA)	4	3	1	4	+7	0	F
(Chinese Taipei) Wang Hsin-Yu (TPE)	4	3	1	4	+5	0	F
(Thailand) Pijittra Saejear (THA)	4	3	1	4	+3	0	F
(Singapore) Wen Lin Lim (SGP)	4	3	1	4	0	2	F
(Malaysia) Aisha Nuval Othman (MAS)	4	3	1	4	–11	0	F
(Singapore) Valerie Cheng (SGP)	4	1	3	4	+3	14	D
(Singapore) Lovinia Choe (SGP)	4	0	4	4	–3	4	F

== Leading goaltenders ==
Only the top goaltenders, based on save percentage, who have played at least 40% of their team's minutes are included in this list.

Player (Team)	MIP	SOG	GA	GAA	SVS%	SO
(Thailand) Wasunun Angkulpattanasuk (THA)	185:00	47	3	0.97	93.62	1
(New Zealand) Lilly Forbes (NZL)	184:34	64	8	2.60	87.50	1
(Singapore) Qina Foo (SGP)	140:00	41	7	3.00	82.93	0
(Chinese Taipei) Fang Heng-Yu (TPE)	120:00	11	2	1.00	81.82	1
(Chinese Taipei) Wang Yu-Chi (TPE)	120:00	22	4	2.00	81.82	0

== See also ==
- 2019 IIHF Women's Challenge Cup of Asia Division I
