= 2019 IIHF Women's Challenge Cup of Asia Division I =

Tournament details
- Host country: United Arab Emirates
- City: Abu Dhabi
- Venue: 1 (in 1 host city)
- Dates: 14–19 April 2019
- Teams: 4

Final positions
- Champions: Philippines (1st title)
- Runners-up: United Arab Emirates
- Third place: India

Tournament statistics
- Games played: 6
- Goals scored: 48 (8 per game)
- Scoring leader: (Philippines) Bianca Yasmine Cuevas (11 points)

Awards
- MVP: (India) Dechen Dolker

The 2019 IIHF Women's Challenge Cup of Asia Division I was an international women's ice hockey tournament run by the International Ice Hockey Federation (IIHF). The tournament took place between 14 April and 19 April 2019 in Abu Dhabi, United Arab Emirates and was the fifth edition held since its formation in 2014 under the IIHF Challenge Cup of Asia series of tournaments. The tournament made up the second level of competition sitting below the 2019 IIHF Women's Challenge Cup of Asia. The Philippines won the tournament after finishing first in the standings. The United Arab Emirates finished in second place and India finished third.

== Overview ==
The 2019 IIHF Women's Challenge Cup of Asia Division I began on 14 April 2019 in Abu Dhabi, United Arab Emirates with games played at the Zayed Sports City Ice Rink. India, the Philippines and the United Arab Emirates returned after missing promotion in last years 2018 Division I tournament. Malaysia did not return to Division I for 2019 after gaining promotion to the top division in 2018. Kuwait made their debut appearance in Division I and in women's international competition. Mongolia were also set to debut however withdrew at the end of March due to a lack of players. The tournament ran alongside the 2019 IIHF Women's Challenge Cup of Asia competition with all games being held in Abu Dhabi.

The tournament consisted of a single round-robin with each team competing in three games. The Philippines won the tournament after winning all three of their games to finish at the top of the standings. The win was the Philippines first gold medal of the competition having previously won bronze in 2018. The United Arab Emirates finished second after losing only to the Philippines and India finished in third. Bianca Yasmine Cuevas of the Philippines led the tournament in scoring with eleven points and was named the best forward by the IIHF Directorate. India's Dechen Dolker and Tsetan Dolma were named most valuable player and top defenceman respectively and Ayah Alsarraf of Kuwait was named best goaltender. The Philippines' Rosalyn Elizabeth Angelina Lim finished as the tournaments leading goaltender with a save percentage of 96.15.

== Standings ==
The final standings of the tournament.

| Team | Pld | W | OTW | OTL | L | GF | GA | GD | Pts |
|---|---|---|---|---|---|---|---|---|---|
| Philippines | 3 | 3 | 0 | 0 | 0 | 17 | 1 | +16 | 9 |
| United Arab Emirates | 3 | 2 | 0 | 0 | 1 | 18 | 4 | +14 | 6 |
| India | 3 | 1 | 0 | 0 | 2 | 13 | 9 | +4 | 3 |
| Kuwait | 3 | 0 | 0 | 0 | 3 | 0 | 34 | −34 | 0 |

Source: IIHF

== Fixtures ==
All times are local. (UAE Standard Time – UTC+4)

| 14 April 2019; 20:00 | India | 2–4 (1–1, 0–1, 1–2) | United Arab Emirates |

Game reference
| 8 min | Penalties | 8 min |
| 13 | Shots | 19 |

| 15 April 2019; 20:00 | Kuwait | 0–10 (0–2, 0–4, 0–4) | Philippines |

Game reference
| 12 min | Penalties | 2 min |
| 3 | Shots | 24 |

| 16 April 2019; 20:00 | Kuwait | 0–13 (0–3, 0–6, 0–4) | United Arab Emirates | Attendance: 169 |

Game reference
| 16 min | Penalties | 35 min |
| 3 | Shots | 44 |

| 17 April 2019; 12:00 | Philippines | 5–0 (2–0, 1–0, 2–0) | India |

Game reference
| 33 min | Penalties | 14 min |
| 16 | Shots | 10 |

| 18 April 2019; 20:00 | India | 11–0 (1–0, 3–0, 7–0) | Kuwait | Attendance: 67 |

Game reference
| 0 min | Penalties | 6 min |
| 22 | Shots | 4 |

| 19 April 2019; 20:00 | United Arab Emirates | 1–2 (0–1, 0–1, 1–0) | Philippines | Attendance: 412 |

Game reference
| 29 min | Penalties | 22 min |
| 13 | Shots | 12 |

== Scoring leaders ==
List shows the top ten skaters sorted by points, then goals, assists, a greater plus-minus, and then lower penalties in minutes.

| Player (Team) | GP | G | A | Pts | +/– | PIM | POS |
|---|---|---|---|---|---|---|---|
| (Philippines) Bianca Yasmine Cuevas (PHI) | 3 | 5 | 6 | 11 | +8 | 2 | F |
| (Philippines) Kayla Herbolario (PHI) | 3 | 4 | 5 | 9 | +8 | 0 | F |
| (United Arab Emirates) Fatima Almazrouei (UAE) | 3 | 5 | 3 | 8 | +9 | 29 | F |
| (United Arab Emirates) Fatima Al Ali (UAE) | 3 | 4 | 2 | 6 | +6 | 4 | F |
| (United Arab Emirates) Lateefa Alsuwaidi (UAE) | 3 | 3 | 3 | 6 | +7 | 0 | F |
| (India) Dechen Dolker (IND) | 3 | 3 | 3 | 6 | +1 | 2 | F |
| (India) Rinchen Dolma (IND) | 3 | 1 | 5 | 6 | +5 | 0 | F |
| (United Arab Emirates) Khulood Shugaa (UAE) | 3 | 3 | 2 | 5 | +7 | 0 | F |
| (Philippines) Danielle Lourdes Imperial (PHI) | 3 | 3 | 2 | 5 | +6 | 2 | F |
| (India) Padma Chorol (IND) | 3 | 2 | 3 | 5 | +7 | 2 | F |
| (Philippines) Shaden Joy Ganac (PHI) | 3 | 1 | 4 | 5 | +5 | 2 | D |

== Leading goaltenders ==
Only the top goaltenders, based on save percentage, who have played at least 40% of their team's minutes are included in this list.

| Player (Team) | MIP | SOG | GA | GAA | SVS% | SO |
|---|---|---|---|---|---|---|
| (Philippines) Rosalyn Elizabeth Angelina Lim (PHI) | 179:29 | 26 | 1 | 0.33 | 96.15 | 2 |
| (United Arab Emirates) Fatima Karashi (UAE) | 119:54 | 25 | 4 | 2.00 | 84.00 | 0 |
| (India) Noor Jahan (IND) | 119:39 | 35 | 9 | 4.51 | 74.29 | 0 |
| (Kuwait) Wdad Hendal (KUW) | 120:00 | 68 | 23 | 11.50 | 66.18 | 0 |

== See also ==
- 2019 IIHF Women's Challenge Cup of Asia
