= 2025 World Junior Ice Hockey Championships – Division I =

International youth ice hockey tournament

2025 IIHF U20 World Championship Division I
Tournament details
- Host countries: Slovenia; Estonia
- Venues: 2 (in 2 host cities)
- Dates: 9–15 December 2024; 11–17 January 2025
- Teams: 12

The 2025 World Junior Ice Hockey Championship Division I consisted of two international under-20 ice hockey tournaments organized by the International Ice Hockey Federation. Division I A represents the second tier and Division I B the third tier of the IIHF World Junior Championship. For each tier's tournament, the first-placed team was promoted to the next higher division, while the bottom-placed team was relegated to a lower division.

To be eligible as a junior player in these tournaments, a player couldn't be born earlier than 2005.

== Division I A ==
2025 IIHF U20 World Championship Division I A

Tournament details
- Host country: Slovenia
- City: Bled
- Venue: 1 (in 1 host city)
- Dates: 9–15 December 2024
- Teams: 6

Tournament statistics
- Games played: 15
- Goals scored: 86 (5.73 per game)
- Attendance: 2,127 (142 per game)
- Scoring leader: (Slovenia) Filip Sitar (9 points)

Official website
- www.iihf.com

The Division I A tournament was played in Bled, Slovenia, from 9 to 15 December 2024.

=== Participating teams ===
Team	Qualification
Norway	placed 10th in Top Division last year and were relegated
France	placed 2nd in Division I A last year
Denmark	placed 3rd in Division I A last year
Austria	placed 4th in Division I A last year
Hungary	placed 5th in Division I A last year
Slovenia (hosts)	placed 1st in Division I B last year and were promoted

=== Standings ===
Pos	Team	Pld	W	OTW	OTL	L	GF	GA	GD	Pts	Promotion or relegation
1	Denmark	5	4	0	1	0	17	12	+5	13	Promotion to the 2026 Top Division
2	Austria	5	4	0	0	1	16	10	+6	12	
3	Norway	5	3	0	0	2	13	8	+5	9	
4	Slovenia (H)	5	2	0	0	3	18	16	+2	6	
5	France	5	1	1	0	3	15	20	−5	5	
6	Hungary	5	0	0	0	5	7	20	−13	0	Relegation to the 2026 Division I B

Source: IIHF
Rules for classification: 1) points; 2) head-to-head points; 3) head-to-head goal difference; 4) head-to-head number of goals scored; 5) result against closest best-ranked team outside tied teams; 6) result against second-best-ranked team outside tied teams; 7) seeding before tournament.
(H) Host

=== Results ===
All times are local (Central European Time – UTC+01:00).

9 December 2024; 12:30	Austria	4–2 (0–0, 4–0, 0–2)	France	Bled Ice Arena, Bled; Attendance: 115

Game reference

Benedikt Oschgan
Goalies
Martin Neckar
Referees:
(Slovakia) Martin Jobbágy
(United States) John Lindner
Linesmen:
(United States) Matthew Heinen
(Slovenia) Filip Jeram

Scherzer (V. Zelenov, Kolarik) (EA) – 21:10	1–0
Sintschnig (I. Zelenov, Klassek) – 24:45	2–0
Klassek (Biber) (PP) – 31:03	3–0
Waschnig (Kogler, Lam) – 37:25	4–0
	4–1	44:48 – Besnier (PS)
	4–2	45:20 – Le Lem (Dufour, Nogaretto) (PP)

10 min
Penalties
10 min
43
Shots
27

9 December 2024; 16:00	Hungary	1–2 (0–0, 0–0, 1–2)	Denmark	Bled Ice Arena, Bled; Attendance: 95

Game reference

Dániel Kiss
Goalies
Tobias Vilykke
Referees:
(Finland) Otto Blomqvist
(Sweden) Johan Wedin
Linesmen:
(Slovakia) Tomáš Gegáň
(Switzerland) Dominik Schlegel

	0–1	47:35 – Olesen (Klyvø)
	0–2	53:39 – Bundgaard (Rubin)
Mihalik (Ravasz) (EA) – 58:50	1–2

6 min
Penalties
10 min
21
Shots
31

9 December 2024; 19:30	Slovenia	1–4 (0–2, 0–1, 1–1)	Norway	Bled Ice Arena, Bled; Attendance: 235

Game reference

Bor Glavič
Goalies
Martin Lundberg
Referees:
(Canada) Adam Forbes
(Austria) Christoph Sternat
Linesmen:
(Germany) Vincent Brueggemann
(Canada) Shawn Oliver

	0–1	04:59 – Eriksen (Vatne, Lafton) (PP)
	0–2	14:43 – Aaram-Olsen
	0–3	36:29 – Lafton (Øversveen, Granath)
	0–4	41:25 – Aaram-Olsen (Eriksen, Lafton)
Sever (Petrovič, Sitar) (PP) – 56:10	1–4

8 min
Penalties
8 min
29
Shots
30

10 December 2024; 12:30	France	5–2 (3–0, 1–1, 1–1)	Hungary	Bled Ice Arena, Bled; Attendance: 102

Game reference

Martin Neckar
Goalies
Dániel Kiss
Referees:
(Finland) Otto Blomqvist
(Austria) Christoph Sternat
Linesmen:
(Slovakia) Tomáš Gegáň
(Latvia) Agris Ozoliņš

Riu (Toukmatchev, Guidoux) – 12:44	1–0
Djian (Chapuis, Lehmann) – 17:17	2–0
Besnier (Delvaille, Vidal) – 17:55	3–0
Nsonsa-Kitala (Nogaretto, Besnier) (PP) – 34:17	4–0
	4–1	34:38 – Ravasz (Ven, Franyó)
	4–2	56:40 – Nemes (Ravasz, Franyó)
Chapuis (ENG) – 58:08	5–2

4 min
Penalties
8 min
29
Shots
37

10 December 2024; 16:00	Norway	1–3 (0–2, 1–0, 0–1)	Austria	Bled Ice Arena, Bled; Attendance: 120

Game reference

Martin Lundberg
Goalies
Benedikt Oschgan
Referees:
(Canada) Adam Forbes
(Sweden) Johan Wedin
Linesmen:
(Slovenia) Filip Jeram
(Canada) Shawn Oliver

	0–1	02:02 – Biber (Klassek, Lanzinger) (PP)
	0–2	18:14 – Gesson (Kogler, I. Zelenov)
Aaram-Olsen (Vatne, Lie) – 30:39	1–2
	1–3	45:41 – Rupnik (V. Zelenov)

10 min
Penalties
6 min
34
Shots
17

10 December 2024; 19:30	Denmark	3–2 (0–0, 1–0, 2–2)	Slovenia	Bled Ice Arena, Bled; Attendance: 210

Game reference

Kristers Steinbergs
Goalies
Jon Dukarič
Referees:
(Slovakia) Martin Jobbágy
(United States) John Lindner
Linesmen:
(Germany) Vincent Brueggemann
(Switzerland) Dominik Schlegel

Andersen (Klyvø, Skovning) – 29:43	1–0
	1–1	42:46 – Hebar (Sever, Sitar) (PP)
	1–2	44:32 – Petrovič (Sever, Hebar)
Olsson (Olesen) – 47:42	2–2
Schioldan (Moelgaard, Thomsen) (PP) – 56:36	3–2

12 min
Penalties
14 min
21
Shots
24

12 December 2024; 12:30	Norway	4–0 (2–0, 2–0, 0–0)	Hungary	Bled Ice Arena, Bled; Attendance: 75

Game reference

Martin Lundberg
Goalies
Olivér Király
Referees:
(United States) John Lindner
(Austria) Christoph Sternat
Linesmen:
(Slovakia) Tomáš Gegáň
(Slovenia) Filip Jeram

Brekke (Hagen, Koblar) – 01:44	1–0
Dehli (Eriksen, Aaram-Olsen) (PP) – 17:57	2–0
Vatne (Evensen, Granath) (EA) – 36:12	3–0
Solberg (Lie, Vatne) – 39:33	4–0

12 min
Penalties
12 min
51
Shots
13

12 December 2024; 16:00	Slovenia	2–3 (0–2, 1–1, 1–0)	Austria	Bled Ice Arena, Bled; Attendance: 250

Game reference

Jon Dukarič
Bor Glavič
Goalies
Benedikt Oschgan
Referees:
(Slovakia) Martin Jobbágy
(Sweden) Johan Wedin
Linesmen:
(United States) Matthew Heinen
(Latvia) Agris Ozoliņš

	0–1	06:07 – Lanzinger (V. Zelenov, Biber) (PP)
	0–2	13:52 – Haiböck (Kolarik, Klassek)
	0–3	31:45 – Haiböck (Reiner, Kolarik)
Sitar (Sever, Petrovič) – 33:18	1–3
Sever (Crnkič, Goličič) (PP) – 55:55	2–3

10 min
Penalties
6 min
34
Shots
25

12 December 2024; 19:30	France	5–4 OT (0–1, 3–2, 1–1) (OT: 1–0)	Denmark	Bled Ice Arena, Bled; Attendance: 75

Game reference

Martin Neckar
Goalies
Tobias Vilykke
Referees:
(Canada) Adam Forbes
(Switzerland) Loic Ruprecht
Linesmen:
(Canada) Shawn Oliver
(Switzerland) Dominik Schlegel

	0–1	19:40 – Olsson (Klyvø, Jakobsen)
	0–2	22:19 – Bundgaard (Petersen)
Nsonsa-Kitala (Le Lem, Besnier) – 25:40	1–2
Delvaille (Djian, Besnier) – 27:50	2–2
Nogaretto (Nsona-Kitala, Besnier) (PP) – 33:49	3–2
	3–3	38:53 – Petersen (Bundgaard, Rubin)
	3–4	52:19 – Thomsen
Delvaille – 58:30	4–4
Nsonsa-Kitala (Riu) – 63:52	5–4

12 min
Penalties
6 min
24
Shots
46

13 December 2024; 12:30	Austria	2–0 (0–0, 0–0, 2–0)	Hungary	Bled Ice Arena, Bled; Attendance: 85

Game reference
Benedikt Oschgan	Goalies	Dániel Kiss	Referees: (Canada) Adam Forbes (Slovakia) Martin Jobbágy; Linesmen: (United States) Matthew Heinen (Switzerland) Dominik Schlegel
Haiböck (Kolarik, Biber) – 42:53 / 1–0; V. Zelenov (Scherzer, Oschgan) (ENG) – 59:47 / 2–0			Referees: (Canada) Adam Forbes (Slovakia) Martin Jobbágy; Linesmen: (United States) Matthew Heinen (Switzerland) Dominik Schlegel
6 min	Penalties	8 min	Referees: (Canada) Adam Forbes (Slovakia) Martin Jobbágy; Linesmen: (United States) Matthew Heinen (Switzerland) Dominik Schlegel
26	Shots	24	Referees: (Canada) Adam Forbes (Slovakia) Martin Jobbágy; Linesmen: (United States) Matthew Heinen (Switzerland) Dominik Schlegel

13 December 2024; 16:00	Denmark	3–0 (1–0, 1–0, 1–0)	Norway	Bled Ice Arena, Bled; Attendance: 75

Game reference

Martin Lundberg
Goalies
Kristers Steinbergs
Referees:
(United States) John Linder
(Sweden) Johan Lindner
Linesmen:
(Slovakia) Tomáš Gegáň
(Slovenia) Filip Jeram

Linde (Thomsen, Schioldan) – 00:28	1–0
Olsson (Moelgaard, Andersen) (PP) – 31:44	2–0
Thomsen (Andersen, Moelgaard) (PP) – 51:02	3–0

2 min
Penalties
8 min
23
Shots
29

13 December 2024; 19:30	France	2–6 (0–2, 2–2, 0–2)	Slovenia	Bled Ice Arena, Bled; Attendance: 180

Game reference

Martin Neckar
Cebald Debiak
Goalies
Bor Glavič
Referees:
(Switzerland) Loic Ruprecht
(Austria) Christoph Sternat
Linesmen:
(Canada) Shawn Oliver
(Latvia) Agris Ozoliņš

	0–1	16:28 – Mahmutović (Smolnikar, Zalokar)
	0–2	18:43 – Smolnikar (Sitar, Goličič)
	0–3	26:53 – Petrovič (Sitar, Sečkar)
	0–4	27:57 – Goličič (Crnkič, Žeželj)
Delvaille (Guidoux, Fine) (PP) – 37:02	1–4
Dufour (Nsonsa-Kitala, Haag) – 37:44	2–4
	2–5	51:39 – Rep (Perčič)
	2–6	59:33 – Crnkič (Mahmutović, Žeželj)

4 min
Penalties
10 min
16
Shots
41

15 December 2024; 12:30	Denmark	5–4 (3–1, 0–1, 2–2)	Austria	Bled Ice Arena, Bled; Attendance: 210

Game reference

Kristers Steinbergs
Goalies
Benedikt Oschgan
Referees:
(United States) John Lindner
(Sweden) Johan Wedin
Linesmen:
(United States) Matthew Heinen
(Canada) Shawn Oliver

Moelgaard (Schioldan, Thomsen) (PP) – 04:32	1–0
	1–1	08:35 – Scherzer (Rebernig, Gruber)
Linde (Thomsen) – 09:54	2–1
Rubin (Olsson, Thomsen) – 12:55	3–1
	3–2	23:32 – Lanzinger (Scherzer)
	3–3	42:02 – Gesson (Sintschnig)
Linde (Schioldan, Thomsen) (PP) – 51:11	4–3
Larson (Rubin, Jakobsen) (PP) – 51:55	5–3
	5–4	55:22 – Neumann (Reiner)

6 min
Penalties
27 min
21
Shots
31

15 December 2024; 16:00	Norway	4–1 (0–1, 2–0, 2–0)	France	Bled Ice Arena, Bled; Attendance: 80

Game reference

Martin Lundberg
Goalies
Martin Neckar
Referees:
(Slovakia) Martin Jobbágy
(Switzerland) Loic Ruprecht
Linesmen:
(Slovenia) Filip Jeram
(Latvia) Agris Ozoliņš

	0–1	11:30 – Fine (Delvaille, Chapuis) (PP)
Pettersen (Eriksen, Aaram-Olsen) – 33:27	1–1
Vatne (Granath) – 34:52	2–1
Brandsegg-Nygård (Aaram-Olsen) – 48:51	3–1
Granath (SH, ENG) – 59:21	4–1

41 min
Penalties
18 min
43
Shots
15

15 December 2024; 19:30	Hungary	4–7 (2–3, 2–3, 0–1)	Slovenia	Bled Ice Arena, Bled; Attendance: 220

Game reference

Dániel Kiss
Olivér Király
Goalies
Bor Glavič
Referees:
(Canada) Adam Forbes
(Austria) Christoph Sternat
Linesmen:
(Slovakia) Tomáš Gegáň
(Switzerland) Dominik Schlegel

Laskawy (Ravasz) – 02:41	1–0
	1–1	03:58 – Crnkič (Sitar, Goličič) (PP)
	1–2	06:54 – Sitar (Rep, Sever)
Mihalik (Franyó) – 08:09	2–2
	2–3	11:28 – Crnkič (Sitar, Goličič) (PP)
	2–4	22:34 – Sever (Sitar, Goličič)
Szongoth (Ravasz, Ven) (PP2) – 25:42	3–4
	3–5	30:15 – Sever (Sečkar, Frešer)
	3–6	33:53 – Mahmutović (Žeželj, Rep) (PP)
Ven (Szongoth, Laskaway) (PP) – 36:24	4–6
	4–7	55:40 – Žeželj (Mahmutović)

8 min
Penalties
6 min
25
Shots
27

=== Statistics ===
==== Top 10 scorers ====
Pos	Player	Country	GP	G	A	Pts	+/–	PIM
1	Filip Sitar	Slovenia	5	2	7	9	+3	4
2	Mark Sever	Slovenia	5	4	4	8	+3	4
3	Hjalte Thomsen	Denmark	5	2	6	8	–1	2
4	Niklas Aaram-Olsen	Norway	5	3	3	6	+3	4
5	Teo Besnier	France	5	2	4	6	+2	4
6	Jan Goličič	Slovenia	5	1	5	6	+2	2
7	Maj Crnkič	Slovenia	5	3	2	5	+4	0
7	Arthur Delvaille	France	5	3	2	5	–4	0
7	Noa Nsonga-Kitala	France	5	3	2	5	–3	6
10	Elias Vatne	Norway	5	2	3	5	+4	0

GP = Games played; G = Goals; A = Assists; Pts = Points; +/− = P Plus–minus; PIM = Penalties In Minutes
Source: IIHF

==== Goaltending leaders ====
(minimum 40% team's total ice time)

Pos	Player	Country	TOI	GA	Sv%	GAA	SO
1	Benedikt Oschgan	Austria	298:43	10	92.86	2.01	1
2	Kristers Steinbergs	Denmark	180:00	6	92.86	2.00	1
3	Martin Lundberg	Norway	300:00	8	91.75	1.60	1
4	Martin Neckar	France	269:11	17	90.81	3.79	0
5	Dániel Kiss	Hungary	209:18	13	87.13	3.73	0

TOI = Time on ice (minutes:seconds); GA = Goals against; GAA = Goals against average; Sv% = Save percentage; SO = Shutouts
Source: IIHF

==== Best Players Selected by the Directorate ====
- Goaltender: (Austria) Benedikt Oschgan
- Defenceman: (France) Teo Besnier
- Forward: (Denmark) Hjalte Thomsen

Source: IIHF

== Division I B ==
2025 IIHF U20 World Championship Division I B

Tournament details
- Host country: Estonia
- City: Tallinn
- Venue: 1 (in 1 host city)
- Dates: 11–17 January 2025
- Teams: 6

Tournament statistics
- Games played: 15
- Goals scored: 118 (7.87 per game)
- Attendance: 11,959 (797 per game)
- Scoring leader: (Japan) Taisetsu Ushio (11 points)

Official website
- www.iihf.com

The Division I B tournament was played in Tallinn, Estonia, from 11 to 17 January 2025.

=== Participating teams ===
Team	Qualification
Japan	placed 6th in Division I A last year and were relegated
Ukraine	placed 2nd in Division I B last year
Italy	placed 3rd in Division I B last year
Estonia (hosts)	placed 4th in Division I B last year
Poland	placed 5th in Division I B last year
South Korea	placed 1st in Division II A last year and were promoted

=== Standings ===
Pos	Team	Pld	W	OTW	OTL	L	GF	GA	GD	Pts	Promotion or relegation
1	Ukraine	5	5	0	0	0	29	10	+19	15	Promotion to the 2026 Division I A
2	Japan	5	2	1	1	1	26	24	+2	9 (Note: Italy 4–7 Japan)	
3	Italy	5	3	0	0	2	23	21	+2	9	
4	Estonia (H)	5	2	0	0	3	16	23	−7	6	
5	Poland	5	1	0	1	3	14	21	−7	4	
6	South Korea	5	0	1	0	4	10	19	−9	2	Relegation to the 2026 Division II A

Source: IIHF
Rules for classification: 1) points; 2) head-to-head points; 3) head-to-head goal difference; 4) head-to-head number of goals scored; 5) result against closest best-ranked team outside tied teams; 6) result against second-best-ranked team outside tied teams; 7) seeding before tournament.
(H) Host

=== Results ===
All times are local (Eastern European Time – UTC+2).

11 January 2025; 12:30	Poland	4–7 (0–2, 3–4, 1–1)	Italy	Tondiraba Ice Hall, Tallinn; Attendance: 158

Game reference

Igor Tyczyński
Jakub Wieczorek
Goalies
Carlo Giordani
Referees:
(Norway) Torjis Brynildsen
(Slovenia) Milan Zrnic
Linesmen:
(Estonia) Savva Azarov
(Slovakia) Peter Jedlička

	0–1	04:39 – Mbow (Pisetta, Remolato) (PP)
	0–2	06:26 – Piechenstein (Esposito)
Petrażycki (Kashalevich, Łojas – 23:20	1–2
	1–3	26:03 – Pisetta (Remolato, Mbow) (PP)
Ja. Hofman (Prokopiak, Hanzel) – 26:57	2–3
	2–4	31:37 – Remolato (Mbow) (PP)
Sawicki (Lisowski) (PP) – 37:22	3–4
	3–5	39:09 – Prast
	3–6	39:40 – Garau (PP)
Jo. Hofman (Dawid, Ja. Hofman) (PP) – 49:57	4–6
	4–7	58:32 – Mantinger (EN)

10 min
Penalties
10 min
38
Shots
24

11 January 2025; 16:00	Estonia	1–8 (0–3, 0–2, 1–3)	Ukraine	Tondiraba Ice Hall, Tallinn; Attendance: 1,541

Game reference

Georg Vladimirov
Cristopher Rembetti
Goalies
Alexander Levshin
Referees:
(Kazakhstan) Anton Boryayev
(Denmark) Niclas Lundsgaard
Linesmen:
(Hungary) Péter Kovács
(Finland) Oskari Saarimäki

	0–1	04:22 – Denysenko (Kulikov)
	0–2	05:13 – Koida
	0–3	15:10 – Yevtiekhov (SH)
	0–4	30:09 – Kulikov
	0–5	30:17 – Kuprianov (Haponenko, Shulha)
	0–6	40:40 – Kosarev (Yevtiekhov) (PP)
	0–7	44:41 – Koida
	0–8	54:07 – Kulikov (Mironov, Denysenko)
Orlov (Ahman) – 58:02	1–8

4 min
Penalties
12 min
32
Shots
37

11 January 2025; 19:30	South Korea	4–3 GWS (0–0, 2–1, 1–2) (OT: 0–0) (SO: 2–0)	Japan	Tondiraba Ice Hall, Tallinn; Attendance: 321

Game reference

Oh Eun-yul
Goalies
Toya Otsuka
Referees:
(France) Cyril Debuche
(Hungary) Gergely Gebei
Linesmen:
(Austria) Wolfgang Puff
(Kazakhstan) Vladislav Zotov

Sohn (Lim E.) – 32:52	1–0
	1–1	37:47 – Suzuki (Fukuda, Okubo)
Chae (Kwon, Lim E.) – 39:26	2–1
Lim E. – 50:26	3–1
	3–2	54:53 – Sasaki (Ushio, Suzuki)
	3–3	56:45 – Mori (Iizuka, Tanahashi)

Kwon
Lee (miss)
Sohn (miss)
Chae
Shootout
(miss) Sasaki
(miss) Okubo
(miss) Koiwa
(miss) Suzuki
8 min
Penalties
2 min
26
Shots
39

12 January 2025; 12:30	Ukraine	3–0 (0–0, 3–0, 0–0)	Poland	Tondiraba Ice Hall, Tallinn; Attendance: 210

Game reference

Alexander Levshin
Goalies
Jakub Wieczorek
Referees:
(Norway) Torjus Brynildsen
(United Kingdom) Andrew Dalton
Linesmen:
(Austria) Wolfgang Puff
(Finland) Oskari Saarimäki

Haponenko (Kosarev, Yevtiekhov) (PP) – 28:48	1–0
Yevtiekhov (Sukhytsky, Koida) – 30:18	2–0
Zherebko (Zdorovets, Shulha) – 33:53	3–0

8 min
Penalties
6 min
33
Shots
13

12 January 2025; 16:00	Japan	7–3 (2–1, 3–1, 2–1)	Estonia	Tondiraba Ice Hall, Tallinn; Attendance: 1,478

Game reference

Jin Yoshida
Goalies
Cristopher Rembetti
Georg Vladimirov
Referees:
(Hungary) Gergely Gebei
(Slovenia) Milan Zrnic
Linesmen:
(Slovakia) Peter Jedlička
(Kazakhstan) Vladislav Zotov

	0–1	01:12 – Burkov (Antonov, Vahi)
Suzuki (Sasaki) (PP) – 02:44	1–1
Okubo (Kokuwa) – 10:40	2–1
Okubo – 25:11	3–1
	3–2	28:55 – Burkov (Antonov, Vahi)
Sasaki (Hotta, Koiwa) (PP) – 29:50	4–2
Kokuwa (Suzuki, Fukuda) – 32:40	5–2
Ushio (Suzuki, Sasaki) (PP) – 41:15	6–2
	6–3	43:54 – Valja (Antonov, Timofejev)
Sasaki (Koiwa) (EN) – 54:44	7–3

6 min
Penalties
16 min
38
Shots
19

12 January 2025; 19:30	Italy	3–1 (1–0, 2–0, 0–1)	South Korea	Tondiraba Ice Hall, Tallinn; Attendance: 347

Game reference

Carlo Giordani
Goalies
Park Jin-hyeok
Referees:
(Kazakhstan) Anton Boryayev
(France) Cyril Debuche
Linesmen:
(Estonia) Savva Azarov
(France) Quentin Ugolini

Gareau (Remolato, Pisetta) – 05:55	1–0
De Luca (Fauster) – 25:39	2–0
Mbow – 28:29	3–0
	3–1	45:14 – Kwon (Jang) (PP)

10 min
Penalties
6 min
19
Shots
28

14 January 2025; 12:30	Japan	7–6 OT (3–2, 2–4, 1–0) (OT: 1–0)	Poland	Tondiraba Ice Hall, Tallinn; Attendance: 343

Game reference

Towa Otsuka
Goalies
Jakub Wieczorek
Igor Tyczyński
Referees:
(United Kingdom) Andrew Dalton
(France) Cyril Debuche
Linesmen:
(Hungary) Péter Kovács
(Finland) Oskari Saarimäki

Ushio – 12:42	1–0
Tanahashi (Koiwa, Shirozu) – 15:01	2–0
	2–1	15:56 – Dawid (Ja. Hofman, Jo. Hofman) (PP)
Ushio – 16:21	3–1
	3–2	17:31 – Ja. Hofman (Dawid, Jo. Hofman)
	3–3	20:38 – Hanzel
Sasaki (Koiwa, Ushio) – 22:53	4–3
	4–4	23:57 – Ziarkowski (Bieda)
	4–5	32:33 – Jo. Hofman
Ishigaki (Tanahashi) – 39:18	5–5
	5–6	39:56 – Lisowski (Sobecki, Stolarski) (PP)
Ushio (Sasaki, Fukuda) (PP) – 42:31	6–6
Ushio (Fukuda) – 60:28	7–6

10 min
Penalties
6 min
38
Shots
28

14 January 2025; 16:00	Ukraine	6–5 (4–2, 2–1, 0–2)	Italy	Tondiraba Ice Hall, Tallinn; Attendance: 432

Game reference

Alexander Levshin
Goalies
Carlo Giordani
Referees:
(Kazakhstan) Anton Boryayev
(Hungary) Gergely Gebei
Linesmen:
(Estonia) Savva Azarov
(Kazakhstan) Vladislav Zotov

	0–1	02:29 – Pisetta (Garau, Remolato) (PP)
Shulha (Yevtiekhov, Kosarev) (PP2) – 06:48	1–1
Kuprianov (Kosarev) (PP) – 07:38	2–1
Zherebko – 07:51	3–1
	3–2	12:20 – Mbow (Pisetta, Prast)
Koida (Kosarev, Yevtiekhov) – 12:29	4–2
Kosarev (Yevtiekhov) (PP2) – 21:19	5–2
Kuprianov (Sukhytsky, Polonytsky) – 26:29	6–2
	6–3	28:35 – Mbow (Pisetta, Gesumaria) (PP2)
	6–4	40:34 – Garau (Remolato, Frick)
	6–5	52:04 – Garau (Remolato, Mbow) (PP)

37 min
Penalties
12 min
56
Shots
19

14 January 2025; 19:30	South Korea	2–6 (1–2, 0–2, 1–2)	Estonia	Tondiraba Ice Hall, Tallinn; Attendance: 1,425

Game reference

Oh Eun-yul
Park Jin-hyeok
Goalies
Georg Vladimirov
Referees:
(Norway) Torjis Brynildsen
(Denmark) Niclas Lundsgaard
Linesmen:
(Austria) Wolfgang Puff
(France) Quentin Ugolini

	0–1	08:36 – Timofejev (Proskurin)
	0–2	11:27 – Luht (Mättik, Abeljanov) (PP)
Kwon (Kim J., Chae) – 16:23	1–2
	1–3	29:07 – Valja (Antonov)
	1–4	32:09 – Burkov (Antonov, Timofejev) (PP)
Chae (Kwon) (SH) – 46:31	2–4
	2–5	47:00 – Orlov (Mättik, Valja) (PP)
	2–6	51:58 – Timofejev (SH)

6 min
Penalties
12 min
28
Shots
27

16 January 2025; 12:30	Italy	4–7 (2–1, 0–2, 2–4)	Japan	Tondiraba Ice Hall, Tallinn; Attendance: 335

Game reference

Carlo Giordani
Goalies
Toya Otsuka
Referees:
(France) Cyril Debuche
(Denmark) Niclas Lundsgaard
Linesmen:
(Slovakia) Peter Jedlička
(France) Quentin Ugolini

Mbow (Pisetta, Garau) (PP) – 10:42	1–0
Fauster (Esposito) – 12:44	2–0
	2–1	14:39 – Suzuki (Sasaki)
	2–2	24:09 – Suzuki (Ushio, Fukuda) (PP)
	2–3	32:29 – Suzuki (Koiwa, Ushio) (PP)
	2–4	46:56 – Ushio (Koiwa, Suzuki)
	2–5	49:01 – Fukuda (Sasaki) (PP)
Pisetta (Garau) (PP) – 51:56	3–5
	3–6	56:48 – Koiwa (SH, EN)
Miglioranzi (Mbow) (EA) – 57:49	4–6
	4–7	59:54 – Ushio (PP, EN)

12 min
Penalties
10 min
26
Shots
56

16 January 2025; 16:00	Ukraine	5–2 (3–2, 1–0, 1–0)	South Korea	Tondiraba Ice Hall, Tallinn; Attendance: 543

Game reference

Alexander Levshin
Goalies
Park Jin-hyeok
An Yeo-jun
Referees:
(Norway) Torjis Brynildsen
(Hungary) Gergely Gebei
Linesmen:
(Estonia) Savva Azarov
(Austria) Wolfgang Puff

D. Baida – 01:25	1–0
	1–1	05:26 – Lim S. (Lee J., Sohn)
Mironov (Polonytsky, Denysenko) – 14:31	2–1
	2–2	17:13 – Kwon (Kim J.)
Shulha (Ivashchenko, Kuprianov) (PP) – 18:54	3–2
Ivashchenko (Zdorovets, Kuprianov) – 32:47	4–2
Koida (I. Baida, D. Baida) – 45:37	5–2

4 min
Penalties
6 min
60
Shots
18

16 January 2025; 19:30	Estonia	3–2 (0–0, 0–1, 3–1)	Poland	Tondiraba Ice Hall, Tallinn; Attendance: 1,858

Game reference

Georg Vladimirov
Goalies
Igor Tyczyński
Referees:
(United Kingdom) Andrew Dalton
(Slovenia) Milan Zrnic
Linesmen:
(Hungary) Péter Kovács
(Kazakhstan) Vladislav Zotov

	0–1	31:17 – Dawid (Ja. Hofman, Jo. Hofman) (PP)
	0–2	50:43 – Petrażycki (Stolarski)
Orlov (Morozov, Proskurin) – 55:42	1–2
Morozov (Burkov, Antonov) (PP, EA) – 59:15	2–2
Timofejev (Ahman, Burkov) – 59:59	3–2

14 min
Penalties
14 min
33
Shots
20

17 January 2025; 12:30	Japan	2–7 (0–2, 1–4, 1–1)	Ukraine	Tondiraba Ice Hall, Tallinn; Attendance: 325

Game reference

Towa Otsuka
Jin Yoshida
Goalies
Alexander Levshin
Referees:
(Denmark) Niclas Lundsgaard
(Slovenia) Milan Zrnic
Linesmen:
(Slovakia) Peter Jedlička
(France) Quentin Ugolini

	0–1	09:25 – Yevtiekhov (Bodnar, Sukhytsky)
	0–2	12:49 – Mironov (Kulikov, Denysenko)
	0–3	24:05 – Haponenko
	0–4	25:11 – Mironov (Denysenko, Kulikov)
	0–5	25:33 – D. Baida (Shulha, Kosarev)
Kokuwa (Okubo, Mori) (PP) – 34:53	1–5
	1–6	39:48 – Kuprianov
Ishigaki (Shirono, Mori) – 51:00	2–6
	2–7	56:59 – Kosarev (Kuprianov, Shulha) (PP)

29 min
Penalties
12 min
28
Shots
44

17 January 2025; 16:00	Poland	2–1 (1–0, 1–1, 0–0)	South Korea	Tondiraba Ice Hall, Tallinn; Attendance: 182

Game reference

Igor Tyczyński
Goalies
Oh Eun-yul
Referees:
(Kazakhstan) Anton Boryayev
(United Kingdom) Andrew Dalton
Linesmen:
(Finland) Oskari Saarimäki
(Kazakhstan) Vladislav Zotov

Ja. Hofman (Dawid, Hanzel) – 06:35	1–0
	1–1	21:02 – Lim S. (Lee J.)
Jo. Hofman (Ja. Hofman, Prokopiak) – 29:15	2–1

2 min
Penalties
4 min
34
Shots
23

17 January 2025; 19:30	Italy	4–3 (1–2, 1–1, 2–0)	Estonia	Tondiraba Ice Hall, Tallinn; Attendance: 2,451

Game reference

Riccardo Santangelo
Goalies
Georg Vladimirov
Referees:
(France) Cyril Debuche
(Hungary) Gergely Gebei
Linesmen:
(Hungary) Péter Kovács
(Austria) Wolfgang Puff

	0–1	03:42 – Timofejev (Burkov, Antonov) (PP)
	0–2	07:20 – Luht (Vahi, Frolkov)
Curti (Garau, Pisetta) – 15:31	1–2
Nitz (Mbow) – 21:39	2–2
	2–3	30:04 – Abeljanov (Frolkov, Koltsov)
Fauster (Graf, Perino) – 51:05	3–3
Perino – 52:48	4–3

4 min
Penalties
4 min
42
Shots
31

=== Statistics ===
==== Top 10 scorers ====
Pos	Player	Country	GP	G	A	Pts	+/–	PIM
1	Taisetsu Ushio	Japan	5	7	4	11	0	2
2	Fallou Mbow	Italy	5	5	5	10	+2	0
3	Fuji Suzuki	Japan	5	5	5	10	+1	31
4	Kazumo Sasaki	Japan	5	4	5	9	−2	4
5	Thomas Pisetta	Italy	5	3	6	9	+3	10
6	Nathan Garau	Italy	5	4	4	8	+2	0
7	Mykola Kosarev	Ukraine	5	3	5	8	+4	4
7	Olexi Yevtiekhov	Ukraine	5	3	5	8	+3	2
9	Ilarion Kuprianov	Ukraine	5	4	3	7	+6	0
10	Jakub Hofman	Poland	5	3	4	7	0	4

GP = Games played; G = Goals; A = Assists; Pts = Points; +/− = P Plus–minus; PIM = Penalties In Minutes
Source: IIHF

==== Goaltending leaders ====
(minimum 40% team's total ice time)

Pos	Player	Country	TOI	GA	Sv%	GAA	SO
1	Alexander Levshin	Ukraine	300:00	10	90.91	2.00	1
2	Carlo Giordani	Italy	238:18	16	90.86	4.03	0
3	Oh Eun-yul	South Korea	176:23	11	88.89	3.74	0
4	Georg Vladimirov	Estonia	223:06	13	88.29	3.50	0
5	Igor Tyczyński	Poland	200:28	14	85.42	4.19	0

TOI = Time on ice (minutes:seconds); GA = Goals against; GAA = Goals against average; Sv% = Save percentage; SO = Shutouts
Source: IIHF

==== Best Players Selected by the Directorate ====
- Goaltender: (Ukraine) Alexander Levshin
- Defenceman: (Ukraine) Mykola Kosarev
- Forward: (Japan) Taisetsu Ushio

Source: [IIHF]
