= Macau women's national ice hockey team =

Macaw women's hockey team

Macau
- Association: Macau Ice Sports Federation
- IIHF code: MAC

First international
- Hong Kong 13–0 Macau (Hong Kong, China; December 1, 2007)

Biggest defeat
- Hong Kong 13–0 Macau (Hong Kong, China; December 1, 2007)

International record (W–L–T)
- 0–1–0

The Macau women's national ice hockey team is the women's national ice hockey team in Macau.

== See also ==
- Sports in Macau
