= Oscar Fisker Mølgaard =

Danish ice hockey player (born 2005)

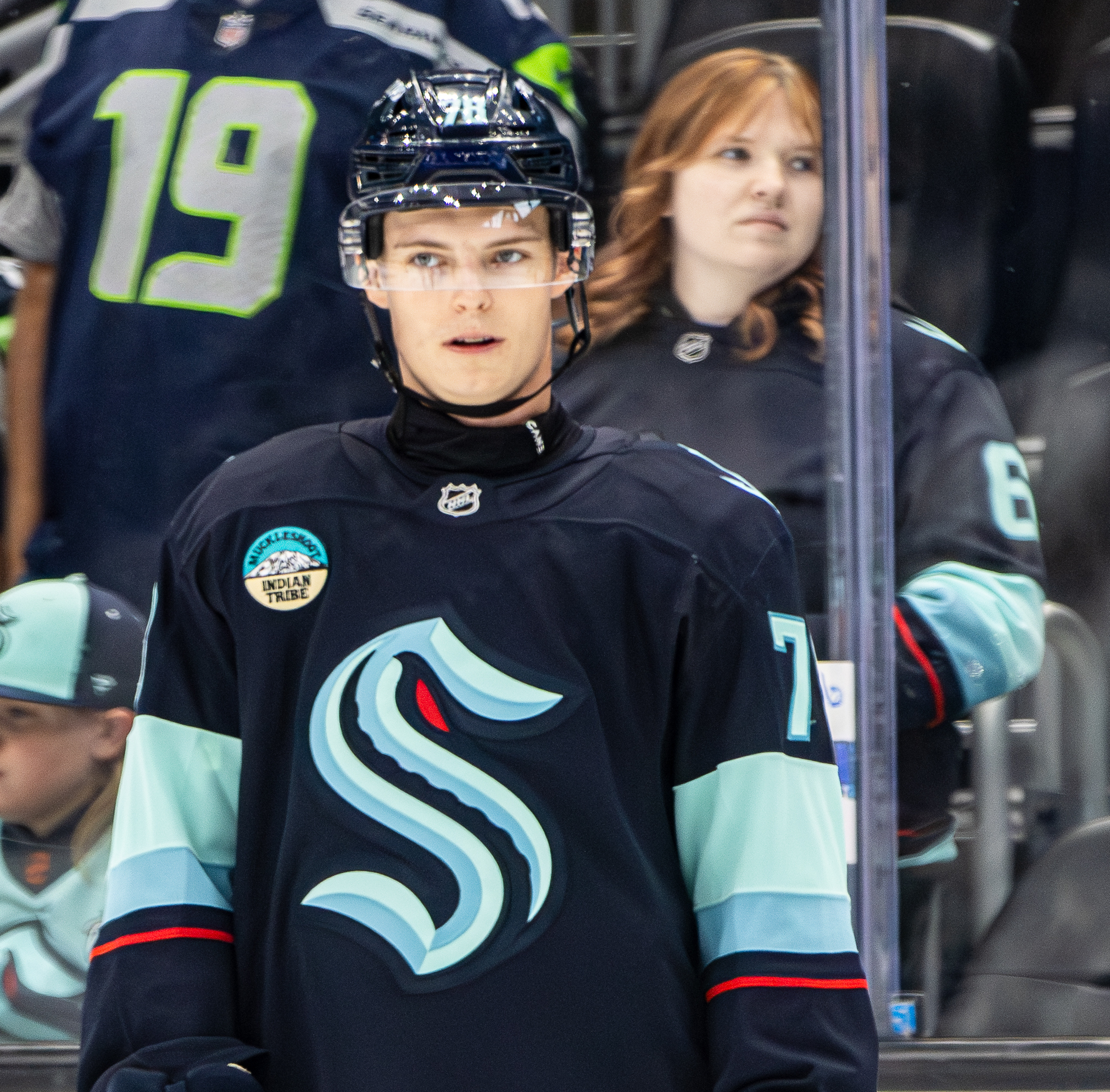
- Mølgaard with the Seattle Kraken in 2025
- Born: 18 February 2005 (age 21) Hjørring, Denmark
- Height: 183 cm (6 ft 0 in)
- Weight: 76 kg (168 lb; 12 st 0 lb)
- Position: Forward
- Shoots: Left
- NHL team (P) Cur. team Former teams: Seattle Kraken; Coachella Valley Firebirds (AHL); HV71
- National team: Denmark
- NHL draft: 52nd overall, 2023; Seattle Kraken
- Playing career: 2022–present

Oscar Fisker Mølgaard (born 18 February 2005) is a Danish professional ice hockey player who is a forward for the Coachella Valley Firebirds of the American Hockey League (AHL) as a prospect to the Seattle Kraken of the National Hockey League (NHL).

== Playing career ==
Mølgaard was selected by the Seattle Kraken in the 2023 NHL entry draft. On 14 June 2024, he signed a three-year, entry-level contract with draft club, the Seattle Kraken. Returning to Jönköping to continue his development with HV71 in the 2024–25 season, Mølgaard posted 8 goals and 19 points in 38 regular season games. Helping the club avoid relegation to the HockeyAllsvenskan in a play-out series, Mølgaard left HV71 at the conclusion of the season and was reassigned by the Kraken to join AHL affiliate, the Coachella Valley Firebirds, to close out the campaign.

On 20 November 2025, Mølgaard made his NHL debut with the Kraken. He tallied an assist during his debut game against the Chicago Blackhawks.

== International play ==
Mølgaard represented the Denmark national team at the 2023, 2024, and 2025 IIHF World Championship.

== Career statistics ==
=== Regular season and playoffs ===
			Regular season					Playoffs
Season	Team	League	GP	G	A	Pts	PIM	GP	G	A	Pts	PIM
2021–22	HV71	J20	25	3	5	8	2	5	0	1	1	0
2022–23	HV71	J20	21	6	17	23	10	3	2	0	2	0
2022–23	HV71	SHL	41	4	3	7	2	—	—	—	—	—
2023–24	HV71	SHL	50	9	12	21	6	—	—	—	—	—
2024–25	HV71	SHL	38	5	14	19	0	—	—	—	—	—
2024–25	Coachella Valley Firebirds	AHL	7	2	1	3	0	—	—	—	—	—
2025–26	Seattle Kraken	NHL	13	0	2	2	2	—	—	—	—	—
2025–26	Coachella Valley Firebirds	AHL	49	10	24	34	12	12	7	4	11	2
SHL totals			129	18	29	47	8	—	—	—	—	—
NHL totals			13	0	2	2	2	—	—	—	—	—

=== International ===
Year	Team	Event	Result	GP	G	A	Pts	PIM
2022	Denmark	U18	13th	5	1	5	6	4
2022	Denmark	WJC-D1	15th	5	0	2	2	0
2023	Denmark	U18-D1	12th	5	6	6	12	0
2023	Denmark	WJC-D1	15th	5	1	2	3	2
2023	Denmark	WC	10th	6	0	0	0	2
2024	Denmark	WJC-D1	13th	4	2	3	5	2
2024	Denmark	WC	13th	7	1	3	4	2
2024	Denmark	OGQ	Q	3	0	0	0	4
2025	Denmark	WJC-D1	11th	5	1	3	4	4
2025	Denmark	WC	4th	10	1	6	7	4
2026	Denmark	OG	9th	4	1	2	3	4
Junior totals				29	11	21	32	12
Senior totals				30	3	11	14	16
