= 2012 IIHF U20 Challenge Cup of Asia =

Tournament details
- Host country: South Korea
- Dates: 27 May – 1 June 2012
- Teams: 5

Final positions
- Champions: (Russia) MHL Red Stars (1st title)

Tournament statistics
- Games played: 10
- Goals scored: 136 (13.6 per game)

The 2012 IIHF U20 Challenge Cup of Asia was the first IIHF U20 Challenge Cup of Asia, an annual international ice hockey tournament held by the International Ice Hockey Federation (IIHF). It took place between 27 May and 1 June 2011 in Seoul, South Korea. Russia, represented by the MHL Red Stars, won the tournament after winning all four of their round robin games and finishing first in the standings. Japan finished second and South Korea finished in third place.

== Overview ==
The 2012 IIHF U20 Challenge Cup of Asia began on 27 May 2012 in Seoul, South Korea will all of the games being played at the Mok-Dong Arena. Russia was represented by the MHL Red Stars, a selection of under-19 players from the Russian Minor Hockey League. The MHL Red Stars won the tournament after winning all four of their games and finishing first in the standings. Japan finished second, losing to Russia and winning in overtime against South Korea who finished in third place. Makuru Furuhashi of Japan finished as the tournaments leading scoring with 17 points, including 12 goals and five assists. Russia's Vasili Demchenko and Vsevolod Kondrashov finished as the leading goaltenders, both with a save percentage of 1.000.

== Standings ==
Pos	Team	Pld	W	OTW	OTL	L	GF	GA	GD	Pts
1	(Russia) MHL Red Stars	4	4	0	0	0	57	0	+57	12
2	Japan	4	2	1	0	1	45	15	+30	8
3	South Korea	4	2	0	1	1	24	16	+8	7
4	China	4	1	0	0	3	7	35	−28	3
5	Chinese Taipei	4	0	0	0	4	3	70	−67	0

Source: IIHF

== Fixtures ==
All times local.

27 May 2012; 16:00	China	5 – 2 (1–2, 0–0, 4–0)	Chinese Taipei	Mok-Dong Arena; Attendance: 157

Game reference

27 May 2012; 19:30	South Korea	0 – 6 (0–1, 0–3, 0–2)	(Russia) MHL Red Stars	Mok-Dong Arena; Attendance: 1075

Game reference

28 May 2012; 16:00	Japan	26 – 0 (11–0, 8–0, 7–0)	Chinese Taipei	Mok-Dong Arena; Attendance: 200

Game reference

28 May 2012; 19:30	South Korea	7 – 1 (4–0, 0–1, 3–0)	China	Mok-Dong Arena; Attendance: 257

Game reference

29 May 2012; 16:00	MHL Red Stars (Russia)	7 – 0 (1–0, 4–0, 2–0)	Japan	Mok-Dong Arena; Attendance: 700

Game reference

30 May 2012; 16:00	MHL Red Stars (Russia)	15 – 0 (6–0, 5–0, 4–0)	China	Mok-Dong Arena; Attendance: 270

Game reference

30 May 2012; 19:30	South Korea	10 – 1 (4–0, 3–1, 3–0)	Chinese Taipei	Mok-Dong Arena; Attendance: 547

Game reference

31 May 2012; 16:00	Japan	11 – 1 (2–0, 5–1, 4–0)	China	Mok-Dong Arena; Attendance: 289

Game reference

1 June 2012; 16:00	Chinese Taipei	0 – 29 (0–10, 0–8, 0–11)	(Russia) MHL Red Stars	Mok-Dong Arena; Attendance: 187

Game reference

1 June 2012; 19:30	Japan	8 – 7 OT (2–0, 3–4, 2–3) (OT: 1–0)	South Korea	Mok-Dong Arena; Attendance: 1348

Game reference

== Scoring leaders ==
List shows the top ten skaters sorted by points, then goals, assists, and the lower penalties in minutes.

Player	GP	G	A	Pts	+/-	PIM	POS
(Japan) Makuru Furuhashi	4	12	5	17	+15	4	F
(Russia) Maxim Shalunov	4	9	5	14	+16	2	F
(Russia) Alexander Kadeikin	4	4	10	14	+14	0	F
(Russia) Danil Fayzullin	4	6	7	13	+15	0	F
(Russia) Bulat Khammatov	4	2	10	12	+14	0	F
(Japan) Kosuke Otsu	4	2	10	12	+12	4	F
(Japan) Tomohiro Konno	4	7	4	11	+9	0	F
(Russia) Azat Mazitov	4	6	4	10	+14	0	F
(Russia) Yavgeni Poltorak	4	4	6	10	+14	10	F
(Russia) Bulat Baykeyev	4	4	5	9	+13	4	F

== Leading goaltenders ==
Only the top goaltenders, based on save percentage, who have played at least 40% of their team's minutes are included in this list.

Player	MIP	SOG	GA	GAA	SVS%
(Russia) Vasili Demchenko	120:00	23	0	0.00	1.000
(Russia) Vsevolod Kondrashov	120:00	27	0	0.00	1.000
(South Korea) Lee Changmin	127:09	44	3	1.42	0.932
(Japan) Yuya Wakimoto	99:59	45	5	3.00	0.889
(Japan) Shun Hitomi	140:19	82	10	4.28	0.878
