= Chinese Taipei women's national ice hockey team =

Chinese Taipei
- Chinese Taipei uses their Olympic flag emblem for their jersey badge.
- Association: Chinese Taipei Ice Hockey Federation
- General manager: Andrew Yin
- Head coach: Huang Jen-hung
- Assistants: Chang Wei-ting
- Captain: Lin Yang-chi
- Most games: Hsieh Chih-chin (53)
- Top scorer: Yeh Hui-chen (53)
- Most points: Yeh Hui-chen (79)
- Team colors
- IIHF code: TPE

Ranking
- Current IIHF: 26 (▼1) (3 June 2026)
- Highest IIHF: 26 (first in 2022)
- Lowest IIHF: 38 (first in 2017)

First international
- Chinese Taipei 21–0 Malaysia (Taipei, Republic of China; 23 March 2016)

Biggest win
- Chinese Taipei 21–0 Malaysia (Taipei, Republic of China; 23 March 2016)

Biggest defeat
- Poland 12–1 Chinese Taipei (Bled, Slovenia; 17 April 2026)

World Championships
- Appearances: 8 (first in 2017)
- Best result: 25th (2022, 2026)

Challenge Cup of Asia
- Appearances: 3 (first in 2015)
- Best result: (gold) (2015, 2016)

International record (W–L–T)
- 29–25–0

The Chinese Taipei women's national ice hockey team is the ice hockey team representing Taiwan internationally in women's competition. The team is overseen by the Chinese Taipei Ice Hockey Federation, a member of the International Ice Hockey Federation. The team was formed in 2014 and competed in the IIHF Women's Challenge Cup of Asia Division I tournament, which it has won on two occasions, currently competes in IIHF Women's Ice Hockey World Championships Division 2B.

== History ==
The Chinese Taipei women's national ice hockey team played its first game in November 2014 at the 2015 IIHF Women's Challenge Cup of Asia Division I tournament. Chinese Taipei won their opening game of the tournament against Hong Kong and went on to win their three other games which included a second win against Hong Kong and two wins against Thailand. Chinese Taipei finished the tournament at the top of the standings and won the gold medal. The team returned to competition in March 2016 for the 2016 IIHF Women's Challenge Cup of Asia Division I tournament. The tournament had expanded to five teams and included India, Malaysia, Singapore and Thailand. Chinese Taipei finished at the top of the standings after winning all four of their games and claimed their second tournament title. The tournament also included the team's 21–0 defeat of Malaysia, their largest win in internal competition.

== International competitions ==
=== World Championship ===
- 2017 – Finished in 33rd place (1st in Division IIB Qualification, Promoted to Division IIB)
- 2018 – Finished in 29th place (2nd in Division IIB)
- 2019 – Finished in 29th place (1st in Division IIB, Promoted to Division IIA)
- 2020 – Cancelled due to the COVID-19 pandemic
- 2021 – Cancelled due to the COVID-19 pandemic
- 2022 – Finished in 25th place (4th in Division IIA)
- 2023 – Finished in 26th place (4th in Division IIA)
- 2024 – Finished in 26th place (4th in Division IIA)
- 2025 – Finished in 26th place (4th in Division IIA)
- 2026 – Finished in 25th place (3rd in Division IIA)

=== Asian Winter Games ===
- 2025 – 5th

=== Women's Challenge Cup of Asia ===
- 2015 Division I – 1st
- 2016 Division I – 1st
- 2019 Top Division – 2nd

== Team ==
Roster for the Group A tournament of the 2025 IIHF Women's World Championship Division II.

Head coach: Huang Jen-hung
Assistant coach: Hsieh Chen-guang

No.	Pos.	Name	Height	Weight	Birthdate	Team
1	G	Chung Ai	1.70 m (5 ft 7 in)	60 kg (130 lb)	5 November 2004 (age 21)	(Chinese Taipei) Vikings
2	D	Huang Min-chuan – A	1.60 m (5 ft 3 in)	58 kg (128 lb)	15 January 1999 (age 27)	(Chinese Taipei) Girl Power
3	D	Lin Yang-chi – C	1.68 m (5 ft 6 in)	62 kg (137 lb)	16 April 2002 (age 24)	(Chinese Taipei) Hornets
4	D	Sha Yun-yun	1.60 m (5 ft 3 in)	60 kg (130 lb)	9 January 2004 (age 22)	(Chinese Taipei) Girl Power
5	D	Chen Yu-chia	1.63 m (5 ft 4 in)	55 kg (121 lb)	31 March 2004 (age 22)	(Chinese Taipei) Icemen
6	D	Liu Chih-lin	1.64 m (5 ft 5 in)	57 kg (126 lb)	11 August 1995 (age 30)	(Chinese Taipei) Silver Monster
7	F	Tan Su-ting	1.60 m (5 ft 3 in)	60 kg (130 lb)	20 June 2002 (age 24)	(Chinese Taipei) Girl Power
8	F	Kao Wei-ting	1.65 m (5 ft 5 in)	62 kg (137 lb)	4 December 2005 (age 20)	(Chinese Taipei) Leopards
9	F	Yao Wan-chih	1.59 m (5 ft 3 in)	55 kg (121 lb)	1 January 1986 (age 40)	(Chinese Taipei) Girl Power
10	F	Huang Yun-chu	1.56 m (5 ft 1 in)	55 kg (121 lb)	15 June 2003 (age 23)	(Chinese Taipei) Hornets
11	D	Yu Xinru	1.66 m (5 ft 5 in)	53 kg (117 lb)	24 July 2007 (age 19)	(Chinese Taipei) Girl Power
13	D	Hsu Yu-tong	1.61 m (5 ft 3 in)	57 kg (126 lb)	22 November 2005 (age 20)	(Chinese Taipei) Leopards
14	F	Chung Ching	1.73 m (5 ft 8 in)	64 kg (141 lb)	12 April 2006 (age 20)	(Chinese Taipei) Vikings
15	F	Hsu Ting-yu	1.63 m (5 ft 4 in)	51 kg (112 lb)	29 October 2000 (age 25)	(Chinese Taipei) Girl Power
16	F	Hsieh Chih-chen – A	1.50 m (4 ft 11 in)	48 kg (106 lb)	30 September 1997 (age 28)	(Chinese Taipei) Girl Power
17	F	Yeh Pei-han	1.53 m (5 ft 0 in)	48 kg (106 lb)	5 October 2004 (age 21)	(Chinese Taipei) Icemen
18	F	Wu Ji-cih	1.75 m (5 ft 9 in)	66 kg (146 lb)	12 July 2006 (age 20)	(Chinese Taipei) Girl Power
19	F	Chang En-wei	1.65 m (5 ft 5 in)	62 kg (137 lb)	19 October 2002 (age 23)	(Chinese Taipei) Icemen
20	G	Hsu Tzu-ting	1.65 m (5 ft 5 in)	58 kg (128 lb)	27 June 1995 (age 31)	(Chinese Taipei) Girl Power
21	F	Chang En-ni	1.64 m (5 ft 5 in)	55 kg (121 lb)	23 July 2004 (age 22)	(Chinese Taipei) Girl Power
22	D	Lin Yi-hsien	1.63 m (5 ft 4 in)	57 kg (126 lb)	11 November 2007 (age 18)	(Chinese Taipei)
23	F	Lin Chieh-yun	1.62 m (5 ft 4 in)	44 kg (97 lb)	17 February 2007 (age 19)	(Chinese Taipei) Leopards

== All-time record against other nations ==
Last match update: 18 March 2022

Key
Positive balance (more Wins)
Neutral balance (Wins = Losses)
Negative balance (more Losses)

Team	GP	W	T	L	GF	GA
Malaysia	2	2	0	0	34	2
Singapore	2	2	0	0	18	2
Turkey	2	2	0	0	12	5
Romania	2	2	0	0	13	7
New Zealand	2	2	0	0	8	2
Iceland	3	2	0	1	10	8
Bulgaria	1	1	0	0	13	0
India	1	1	0	0	13	0
Hong Kong	1	1	0	0	10	1
South Africa	1	1	0	0	7	1
Croatia	1	1	0	0	3	0
Belgium	1	1	0	0	2	1
Thailand	2	1	0	1	10	4
Kazakhstan	1	0	0	1	1	7
Italy	1	0	0	1	0	7
Spain	2	0	0	2	1	10
Total	25	9	0	6	162	50
