= 2010 World Junior Ice Hockey Championships – Division I =

2010 IIHF U20 World Championship Division I
Tournament details
- Host countries: France; Poland
- Venue(s): 3 (in 3 host cities)
- Dates: 14–20 December 2009
- Teams: 12

The 2010 World Junior Ice Hockey Championship Division I was a pair of international ice hockey tournaments organized by the International Ice Hockey Federation. Division I represents the second level of the 2010 World Junior Ice Hockey Championships. The winners of each group were promoted to the Top Division for the 2011 IIHF World U20 Championship, while the last-placed teams in each group were relegated to the 2011 Division II.

== Group A ==
The Group A tournament was played in Megève and Saint-Gervais-les-Bains, France, from 14 to 20 December 2009.

=== Participating teams ===
Team	Qualification
Germany	Placed 9th in Top Division last year and were relegated.
Denmark	Placed 2nd in Division I (Group B) last year.
France	Hosts; placed 3rd in Division I (Group A) last year.
Slovenia	Placed 4th in Division I (Group A) last year.
Ukraine	Placed 5th in Division I (Group B) last year.
Japan	Placed 1st in Division II (Group A) last year and were promoted.

=== Final standings ===
Pos	Team	Pld	W	OTW	OTL	L	GF	GA	GD	Pts	Promotion or relegation
1	Germany	5	5	0	0	0	27	3	+24	15	Promoted to the 2011 Top Division
2	Denmark	5	4	0	0	1	21	9	+12	12	
3	Slovenia	5	2	1	0	2	8	12	−4	8	
4	Ukraine	5	1	0	1	3	15	23	−8	4	
5	Japan	5	1	0	0	4	9	26	−17	3	
6	France (H)	5	1	0	0	4	9	16	−7	3	Relegated to the 2011 Division II

Source: IIHF
(H) Host

=== Match results ===
All times are local (Central European Time – UTC+1).

14 December 2009; 14:30	Slovenia	0–3 (0–0, 0–0, 0–3)	Denmark	Saint Gervais Arena

Game reference

14 December 2009; 20:00	Ukraine	3–6 (1–1, 2–1, 0–4)	France	Saint Gervais Arena

Game reference

14 December 2009; 20:00	Japan	0–9 (0–4, 0–3, 0–2)	Germany	Megève Arena

Game reference

15 December 2009; 14:30	Germany	6–0 (1–0, 0–0, 5–0)	Slovenia	Megève Arena

Game reference

15 December 2009; 20:00	France	1–4 (0–0, 1–2, 0–2)	Japan	Saint Gervais Arena

Game reference

16 December 2009; 18:00	Denmark	7–3 (2–1, 5–1, 0–1)	Ukraine	Saint Gervais Arena

Game reference

17 December 2009; 14:30	Japan	1–4 (0–1, 1–0, 0–3)	Slovenia	Megève Arena

Game reference

17 December 2009; 20:00	Germany	6–2 (2–0, 4–1, 0–1)	Ukraine	Saint Gervais Arena

Game reference

17 December 2009; 20:00	Denmark	5–0 (4–0, 1–0, 0–0)	France	Megève Arena

Game reference

18 December 2009; 20:00	France	1–2 (1–0, 0–0, 0–2)	Germany	Megève Arena

Game reference

19 December 2009; 20:00	Slovenia	2–1 GWS (0–0, 0–1, 1–0) (0–0, 1–0)	Ukraine	Saint Gervais Arena

Game reference

19 December 2009; 20:00	Denmark	6–2 (1–0, 1–0, 4–2)	Japan	Megève Arena

Game reference

20 December 2009; 14:30	Ukraine	6–2 (1–1, 2–1, 3–0)	Japan	Saint Gervais Arena

Game reference

20 December 2009; 16:00	Germany	4–0 (1–0, 2–0, 1–0)	Denmark	Megève Arena

Game reference

20 December 2009; 20:00	France	1–2 (1–0, 0–1, 0–1)	Slovenia	Megève Arena

Game reference

== Group B ==
The Group B tournament was played in Gdańsk, Poland, from 14 to 20 December 2009.

=== Participating teams ===
Team	Qualification
Kazakhstan	Placed 10th in Top Division last year and were relegated.
Belarus	Placed 2nd in Division I (Group A) last year.
Norway	Placed 3rd in Division I (Group B) last year.
Italy	Placed 4th in Division I (Group B) last year.
Poland	Hosts; placed 5th in Division I (Group A) last year.
Croatia	Placed 1st in Division II (Group B) last year and were promoted.

=== Final standings ===
Pos	Team	Pld	W	OTW	OTL	L	GF	GA	GD	Pts	Promotion or relegation
1	Norway	5	4	1	0	0	33	8	+25	14	Promoted to the 2011 Top Division
2	Belarus	5	3	0	2	0	30	12	+18	11	
3	Italy	5	2	1	0	2	8	8	0	8	
4	Kazakhstan	5	2	0	0	3	20	16	+4	6	
5	Croatia	5	1	0	0	4	14	51	−37	3	
6	Poland (H)	5	1	0	0	4	12	22	−10	3	Relegated to the 2011 Division II

Source: IIHF
(H) Host

=== Match results ===
All times are local (Central European Time – UTC+1).

14 December 2009; 13:00	Italy	3–2 GWS (1–2, 0–0, 1–0) (0–0, 1–0)	Belarus	Olivia, Gdańsk

Game reference

14 December 2009; 16:30	Croatia	1–10 (0–4, 0–2, 1–4)	Kazakhstan	Olivia, Gdańsk

Game reference

14 December 2009; 20:00	Poland	2–5 (1–2, 1–1, 0–2)	Norway	Olivia, Gdańsk

Game reference

15 December 2009; 13:00	Kazakhstan	1–3 (1–2, 1–1, 0–2)	Italy	Olivia, Gdańsk

Game reference

15 December 2009; 16:30	Norway	18–2 (6–1, 6–0, 6–1)	Croatia	Olivia, Gdańsk

Game reference

15 December 2009; 20:00	Belarus	5–1 (1–1, 1–0, 3–0)	Poland	Olivia, Gdańsk

Game reference

17 December 2009; 13:00	Belarus	2–3 GWS (1–1, 1–1, 0–0) (0–0, 0–1)	Norway	Olivia, Gdańsk

Game reference

17 December 2009; 16:30	Croatia	1–2 (0–1, 0–0, 1–1)	Italy	Olivia, Gdańsk

Game reference

17 December 2009; 20:00	Kazakhstan	6–3 (1–1, 2–1, 3–1)	Poland	Olivia, Gdańsk

Game reference

18 December 2009; 13:00	Belarus	16–4 (7–0, 5–1, 4–3)	Croatia	Olivia, Gdańsk

Game reference

18 December 2009; 16:30	Norway	4–2 (2–0, 0–2, 2–0)	Kazakhstan	Olivia, Gdańsk

Game reference

18 December 2009; 20:00	Italy	0–1 (0–0, 0–1, 0–0)	Poland	Olivia, Gdańsk

Game reference

20 December 2009; 13:00	Kazakhstan	1–5 (0–1, 0–3, 1–1)	Belarus	Olivia, Gdańsk

Game reference

20 December 2009; 16:30	Norway	3–0 (0–0, 1–0, 2–0)	Italy	Olivia, Gdańsk

Game reference

20 December 2009; 20:00	Poland	5–6 (3–2, 1–1, 1–3)	Croatia	Olivia, Gdańsk

Game reference
