= Anton Malyshev =

Russian ice hockey player

- Born: February 24, 1985 (age 40); Saint Petersburg, Russia
- Height: 5 ft 11 in (180 cm)
- Weight: 170 lb (77 kg; 12 st 2 lb)
- Position: Forward
- Shoots: Left
- VHL team Former teams: VMF Karelia; Avangard Omsk; HC Sibir Novosibirsk; Amur Khabarovsk; SKA Saint Petersburg
- Playing career: 2005–present

Anton Malyshev (born February 24, 1985) is a Russian professional ice hockey player. He is currently playing with VMF Karelia of the Supreme Hockey League (VHL).

Malyshev made his Kontinental Hockey League debut playing with Avangard Omsk during the inaugural 2008–09 KHL season.
