= Martin Neckar =

French ice hockey player (born 2005)

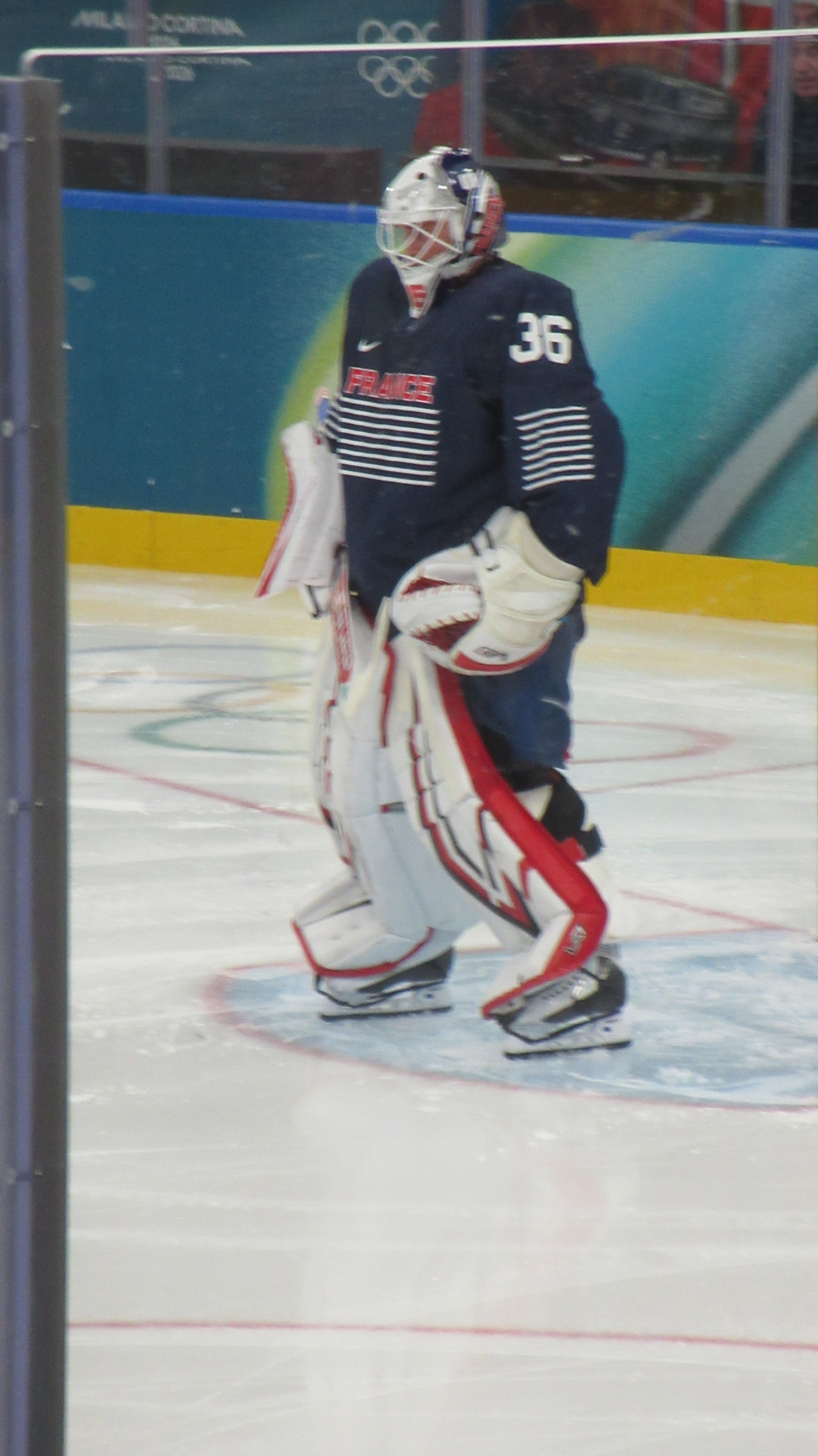
- Neckar at the 2026 Winter Olympics
- Born: 12 September 2005 (age 20) Dijon, France
- Height: 185 cm (6 ft 1 in)
- Weight: 82 kg (181 lb; 12 st 13 lb)
- Position: Goaltender
- Catches: Left
- NL team: SCL Tigers
- National team: France
- Playing career: 2024–present

Martin Neckar (Czech: Neckář; born 12 September 2005) is a French professional ice hockey player who is a goaltender for SCL Tigers of the National League (NL).

== Playing career ==
On 25 June 2025, Neckar signed a contract extension with SCL Tigers through 2028.

== International play ==
Neckar represented the France national team at the 2026 Winter Olympics.

== Personal life ==
Neckar is a French–Czech dual citizen.
