= Hong Kong women's national ice hockey team =

Ice hockey team

Hong Kong
- Hong Kong uses their national emblem as the badge on their teams' jerseys
- Association: Hong Kong Ice Hockey Association
- General manager: Kevin Leung
- Head coach: Michael Beharrell
- Assistants: Jeff Compton; Robert Kang; Camryn Wong; Ivano Zanatta
- Captain: Estelle Ip
- Most games: Yeuk Ting Lau (55)
- Top scorer: Estelle Ip (30)
- Most points: Estelle Ip (59)
- Home stadium: Mega Box
- Team colors
- IIHF code: HKG

Ranking
- Current IIHF: 32 (▼1) (3 June 2026)
- Highest IIHF: 29 (2018)
- Lowest IIHF: 37 (2014)

First international
- Hong Kong 13–0 Macau (Hong Kong, China; 1 December 2007)

Biggest win
- Hong Kong 13–0 Macau (Hong Kong, China; 1 December 2007)

Biggest defeat
- Japan 46–0 Hong Kong (Sapporo, Japan; 21 February 2017)

World Championships
- Appearances: 11 (first in 2014)
- Best result: 31st (2024)

International record (W–L–T)
- 22–39–0

Hong Kong women's national ice hockey team
- Traditional Chinese: 香港女子冰球代表隊
- Jyutping: hoeng1 gong2 neoi5 zi2 bing1 kau4 doi6 biu2 deoi6
Transcriptions
Standard Mandarin
- Hanyu Pinyin: Xiānggǎng Nǚzǐ Bīngqiú Dàibiǎo Duì
Yue: Cantonese
- Jyutping: hoeng1 gong2 neoi5 zi2 bing1 kau4 doi6 biu2 deoi6

The Hong Kong women's national ice hockey team (Chinese: 香港女子冰球代表隊) is the women's national ice hockey team of Hong Kong. The team began participating in the IIHF World Championship in 2014 at the Division II Qualification level in Mexico City.

== Tournament record ==
=== World Championships ===
- 2014 – Finished in 36th place (4th in Division IIB Qualification)
- 2015 – Finished in 34th place (2nd in Division IIB Qualification)
- 2016 – Finished in 34th place (2nd in Division IIB Qualification)
- 2017 – Finished in 37th place (5th in Division IIB Qualification)
- 2018 – Finished in 37th place (4th in Division IIB Qualification)
- 2019 – Finished in 38th place (4th in Division IIB Qualification)
- 2020 – Finished in 40th place (6th in Division III)
- 2021 – Cancelled due to the COVID-19 pandemic
- 2022 – Withdrawn due to the COVID-19 pandemic
- 2023 – Finished in 33rd place (1st in Division IIIA)
- 2024 – Finished in 31st place (3rd in Division IIB)
- 2025 – Finished in 33rd place (5th in Division IIB)
- 2026 – Finished in 29th place (1st in Division IIB)

=== Asian Games ===
- 2017 – Finished in 6th place
- 2025 – Finished in 7th place

== All-time record against other nations ==
Last match update: 18 March 2022

Key
Positive balance (more Wins)
Neutral balance (Wins = Losses)
Negative balance (more Losses)

Team	GP	W	T	L	GF	GA
Bulgaria	7	4	0	3	27	25
Macau	1	1	0	0	13	0
United Arab Emirates	1	1	0	0	9	0
Singapore	1	1	0	0	7	1
Thailand	2	1	0	1	8	5
Lithuania	1	0	0	1	1	4
Ukraine	1	0	0	1	2	5
Chinese Taipei	1	0	0	1	1	10
Croatia	1	0	0	1	0	10
South Korea	1	0	0	1	0	14
Kazakhstan	1	0	0	1	0	19
China	1	0	0	1	0	20
Japan	1	0	0	1	0	46
Romania	2	0	0	2	4	7
Turkey	2	0	0	2	3	12
Mexico	2	0	0	2	0	14
South Africa	7	2	0	5	12	39
Belgium	4	0	0	4	3	37
Total	37	10	0	27	90	268
