= 2018 IIHF Women's Challenge Cup of Asia Division I =

International women's ice hockey tournament

Tournament details
- Host country: Malaysia
- Venue: 1 (in 1 host city)
- Dates: 6–9 March 2018
- Teams: 4

Final positions
- Champions: Malaysia (1st title)
- Runners-up: United Arab Emirates
- Third place: Philippines

Tournament statistics
- Games played: 6
- Goals scored: 41 (6.83 per game)
- Attendance: 1,774 (296 per game)
- Scoring leader: (Philippines) Bianca Cuevas (9 points)

Awards
- MVP: (Philippines) Bianca Cuevas

The 2018 IIHF Women's Challenge Cup of Asia Division I was an international women's ice hockey tournament run by the International Ice Hockey Federation. The tournament took place between 6 and 9 March 2018 at the Empire City Ice Arena in Kuala Lumpur, Malaysia. This edition marks the return of the Division I tournament after no division tournament was held in 2017.

The tournament was contested by four nations. Host Malaysia won the tournament after winning over the United Arab Emirates in their last round robin match.

== Round robin ==
Team	Pld	W	OTW	OTL	L	GF	GA	GD	Pts
Malaysia	3	3	0	0	0	13	4	+9	9
United Arab Emirates	3	2	0	0	1	14	10	+4	6
Philippines	3	1	0	0	2	11	10	+1	3
India	3	0	0	0	3	3	17	−14	0

Source: IIHF

6 March 2018; 15:30	United Arab Emirates	6 – 1 (3–0, 1–1, 2–0)	India	Empire City Ice Arena; Attendance: 153

Game reference
6 min	Penalties	6 min
44	Shots	12

6 March 2018; 19:00	Philippines	1 – 3 (0–1, 1–1, 0–1)	Malaysia	Empire City Ice Arena; Attendance: 388

Game reference
14 min	Penalties	8 min
24	Shots	28

7 March 2018; 15:30	Philippines	4 – 5 (2–3, 2–1, 0–1)	United Arab Emirates	Empire City Ice Arena; Attendance: 164

Game reference
18 min	Penalties	8 min
23	Shots	29

7 March 2018; 19:00	India	0 – 5 (0–1, 0–1, 0–3)	Malaysia	Empire City Ice Arena; Attendance: 411

Game reference
10 min	Penalties	10 min
15	Shots	33

9 March 2018; 15:30	India	2 – 6 (2–0, 0–4, 0–2)	Philippines	Empire City Ice Arena; Attendance: 198

Game reference
6 min	Penalties	2 min
15	Shots	33

9 March 2018; 19:00	Malaysia	5 – 3 (1–1, 2–1, 2–1)	United Arab Emirates	Empire City Ice Arena; Attendance: 460

Game reference
8 min	Penalties	18 min
23	Shots	22

== Final standings ==
Rank	Team	Pld	W	L
1st place, gold medalist(s)	Malaysia	3	3	0
2nd place, silver medalist(s)	United Arab Emirates	3	2	1
3rd place, bronze medalist(s)	Philippines	3	1	2
4	India	3	0	3
