= Japan men's national junior ice hockey team =

Japan
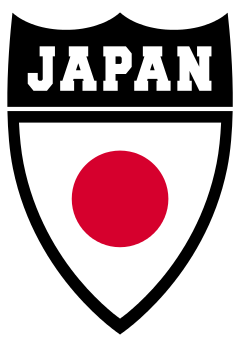
- Association: Japan Ice Hockey Federation
- Head coach: (Canada) Perry Pearn
- Assistants: (Japan) Teruhiko Okita (Japan) Terashima Hiroshi
- Captain: Yuto Osawa
- Most games: Hiroshi Sato (17)
- Most points: Makuru Furuhashi (29)
- IIHF code: JPN

First international
- Norway 4 – 2 Japan (Heerenveen, Netherlands; March 16, 1982)

Biggest win
- Japan 17 – 1 Iceland (Canazei, Italy; December 13, 2007)

Biggest defeat
- Sweden 20 – 1 Japan (Gävle, Sweden; December 30, 1992)

IIHF World U20 Championship
- Appearances: 43 (first in 1982)
- Best result: 8th (1993)

International record (W–L–T)
- 91–84–13

The Japanese men's national under-20 ice hockey team (Japanese: アイスホッケー男子U-20日本代表 Aisuhokkē Danshi U-20 Nippon Daihyō) represents Japan at the International Ice Hockey Federation's World Junior Hockey Championship Division I.

== Results ==
- 1982 – 11th overall (3rd in Pool B)
- 1983 – 10th overall (2nd in Pool B)
- 1984 – 11th overall (3rd in Pool B)
- 1985 – 11th overall (3rd in Pool B)
- 1986 – 13th overall (5th in Pool B)
- 1987 – 11th overall (3rd in Pool B)
- 1988 – 12th overall (4th in Pool B)
- 1989 – 12th overall (4th in Pool B)
- 1990 – 11th overall (3rd in Pool B)
- 1991 – 12th overall (4th in Pool B)
- 1992 – 9th overall (1st in Pool B)
- 1993 – 8th overall
- 1994 – 15th overall (7th in Pool B)
- 1995 – 15th overall (7th in Pool B)
- 1996 – 16th overall (6th in Pool B)
- 1997 – 16th overall (6th in Pool B)
- 1998 – 18th overall (8th in Pool B)
- 1999 – 20th overall (2nd in Pool C)
- 2000 – 23rd overall (5th in Pool C)
- 2001 – 20th overall (2nd in Division II)
- 2002 – 19th overall (1st in Division II)
- 2003 – 13th overall (2nd in Division IA)
- 2004 – 21st overall (6th in Division IB)
- 2005 – 24th overall (1st in Division IIA)
- 2006 – 22nd overall (6th in Division IA)
- 2007 – 27th overall (3rd in Division IIB)
- 2008 – 24th overall (2nd in Division IIA)
- 2009 – 23rd overall (1st in Division IIA)
- 2010 – 15th overall (5th in Division IA)
- 2011 – 15th overall (5th in Division IA)
- 2012 – 22nd overall (6th in Division IB)
- 2013 – 23rd overall (1st in Division IIA)
- 2014 – 21st overall (5th in Division IB)
- 2015 – 21st overall (5th in Division IB)
- 2016 – Withdrew (6th in Division IB)
- 2017 – 24th overall (2nd in Division IIA)
- 2018 – 23rd overall (1st in Division IIA)
- 2019 – 22nd overall (6th in Division IB)
- 2020 – 23rd overall (1st in Division IIA)
- 2021 – Cancelled due to COVID-19 pandemic
- 2022 – 19th overall (3rd in Division IB)
- 2023 – 17th overall (1st in Division IB)
- 2024 – 16th overall (6th in Division IA)
- 2025 – 18th overall (2nd in Division IB)
- 2026 – 21st overall (5th in Division IB)
