= South Korea men's national junior ice hockey team =

Korea
- Association: Korea Ice Hockey Association
- Head coach: (South Korea) Yoon Sung-youp
- Assistants: (South Korea) Lee Dong-ho
- Captain: Hwang Woo-tae
- Most points: Park Woo-sang (20)
- IIHF code: KOR

First international
- North Korea 10 – 1 South Korea (Eindhoven, Netherlands; 16 March 1990)

Biggest win
- South Korea 26 – 1 Greece (Belgrade, Yugoslavia; 2 January 1991)

Biggest defeat
- South Korea 1 – 13 Great Britain (Tallinn, Estonia; 14 January 2019)

IIHF World U20 Championship
- Appearances: 27 (first in 1990)
- Best result: 21st (1990, 1991)

International record (W–L–T)
- 39–28–3

The South Korean men's national under 20 ice hockey team is the national under-20 ice hockey team in South Korea. The team represents South Korea at the International Ice Hockey Federation's World Junior Hockey Championship Division II.

== Record ==
- 1990 – 21st overall (5th in Pool C)
- 1991 – 21st overall (5th in Pool C)
- 1992 – 22nd overall (6th in Pool C)
- 1993 – 24th overall (8th in Pool C)
- 1994–2002 – Did not participate
- 2003 – 35th overall (1st in Division III)
- 2004 – 25th overall (2nd in Division II Group B)
- 2005 – 25th overall (2nd in Division II Group B)
- 2006 – 28th overall (3rd in Division II Group B)
- 2007 – 30th overall (4th in Division II Group A)
- 2008 – 27th overall (3rd in Division II Group A)
- 2009 – 27th overall (3rd in Division II Group A)
- 2010 – 29th overall (4th in Division II Group A)
- 2011 – 27th overall (3rd in Division II Group B)
- 2012 – 28th overall (6th in Division IIA)
- 2013 – 30th overall (2nd in Division IIB)
- 2014 – 29th overall (1st in Division IIB)
- 2015 – 25th overall (3rd in Division IIA)
- 2016 – 28th overall (6th in Division IIA)
- 2017 – 29th overall (1st in Division IIB)
- 2018 – 24th overall (2nd in Division IIA)
- 2019 – 28th overall (6th in Division IIA)
- 2020 – 29th overall (1st in Division IIB)
- 2021 – Cancelled due to COVID-19 pandemic
- 2022 – 24th overall (2nd in Division IIA)
- 2023 – 22nd overall (6th in Division IB)
- 2024 – 23rd overall (1st in Division IIA)
- 2025 – 22nd overall (6th in Division IB)
- 2026 – 23rd overall (1st in Division IIA)
