= 2023 in ice hockey =

The following were the events of ice hockey for the year 2023 throughout the world.

== World Championships ==
2023 World Ice Hockey Divisions for the International Ice Hockey Federation (IIHF) took place between December 11, 2022 and August 26, 2023.

=== World Junior Ice Hockey Championships ===
- December 26, 2022 – January 5: 2023 IIHF World Junior Championship in Halifax and Moncton
  - Canada defeated Czechia, 3–2 in overtime, to win their 20th World Junior Ice Hockey Championship title.
  - The United States defeated Sweden, 8–7 in overtime, to win the bronze medal.
  - Austria was relegated to Division I – Group A for 2024.

==== Divisions ====
- December 11, 2022 – December 17, 2022: Division I – Group A in Asker
  - Final Round Robin placements: 1. Norway, 2. Kazakhstan, 3. France, 4. Hungary, 5. Denmark, 6. Slovenia
  - Norway was promoted to the Top Division for 2024.
  - Slovenia was relegated to Division I – Group B for 2024.
- December 11, 2022 – December 17, 2022: Division I – Group B in Bytom
  - Final Round Robin placements: 1. Japan, 2. Ukraine, 3. Italy, 4. Poland, 5. Estonia, 6. South Korea
  - Japan was promoted to Division I – Group A for 2024.
  - South Korea was relegated to Division II – Group A for 2024.
- December 11, 2022 – December 17, 2022: Division II – Group A in Kaunas
  - Final Round Robin placements: 1. Croatia, 2. Great Britain, 3. Lithuania, 4. Spain, 5. Netherlands, 6. Romania
  - Croatia was promoted to Division I – Group B for 2024.
  - Romania was relegated to Division II – Group B for 2024.
- January 16 – 22: Division II – Group B in Reykjavík
  - Final Round Robin placements: 1. China, 2. Belgium, 3. Serbia, 4. Iceland, 5. Chinese Taipei, 6. Mexico
  - China was promoted to Division II – Group A for 2024.
  - Mexico was relegated to Division III for 2024.
- January 26 – February 2: Division III in (Turkey) Istanbul
  - Australia defeated Israel, 4–1, to win the tournament.
  - Australia was promoted to Division II – Group B for 2024.

=== IIHF World Women's U18 Championship ===
- January 8 – 15: 2023 IIHF World Women's U18 Championship in Östersund
  - Canada defeated Sweden, 10–0, to win their seventh World Women's U18 Championship title.
  - The United States defeated Finland, 5–0, to win the bronze medal.
  - Japan was relegated to Division I – Group A for 2024.

==== Divisions ====
- January 9 – 15: Division I – Group A in Ritten
  - Final Round Robin placements: 1. Germany, 2. Italy, 3. France, 4. Hungary, 5. Austria, 6. Norway
  - Germany was promoted to the Top Division for 2024.
  - Norway was relegated to Division I – Group B for 2024.
- January 10 – 15: Division I – Group B in Katowice
  - Final Round Robin placements: 1. Denmark, 2. Poland, 3. Spain, 4. South Korea, 5. Chinese Taipei, 6. China
  - Denmark was promoted to Division I – Group A for 2024.
  - China withdrew from the tournament before it began, and were relegated to Division II – Group A for 2024.
- January 21 – 27: Division II – Group A in (United Kingdom) Dumfries
  - Final Round Robin placements: 1. Australia, 2. Latvia, 3. Netherlands, 4. Great Britain, 5. Turkey, 6. Mexico
  - Australia was promoted to Division I – Group B for 2024.
  - Mexico was relegated to Division II – Group B for 2024.
- January 26 – February 1: Division II – Group B in Sofia
  - Final Round Robin placements: 1. Kazakhstan, 2. Belgium, 3. Iceland, 4. New Zealand, 5. Bulgaria, 6. Estonia
  - Kazakhstan was promoted to Division II – Group A for 2024.

=== IIHF Women's World Championship ===
- April 5 – 16: 2023 IIHF Women's World Championship in Brampton
  - The United States defeated Canada, 6–3, to win their tenth Women's World Championship title.
  - Czechia defeated Switzerland, 3–2, to win the bronze medal.
  - Hungary and France were relegated to Division I – Group A for 2024.

==== Divisions ====
- February 20 – 26: Division II – Group B in Cape Town
  - Final Round Robin placements: 1. Belgium, 2. Australia, 3. New Zealand, 4. South Africa, 5. Croatia, 6. Turkey
  - Belgium was promoted to Division II – Group A for 2024.
  - Croatia was relegated to Division III – Group A for 2024.
  - Turkey withdrew from the tournament before it began due to the 2023 Turkey–Syria earthquake.
- March 26 – 31: Division III – Group B in Tnuvot
  - Final Round Robin placements: 1. Serbia, 2. Israel, 3. Bosnia and Herzegovina
  - Serbia was promoted to Division III – Group A for 2024.
- April 2 – 7: Division II – Group A in Mexico City
  - Final Round Robin placements: 1. Latvia, 2. Spain, 3. Mexico, 4. Chinese Taipei, 5. Iceland, 6. North Korea
  - Latvia was promoted to Division I – Group B for 2024.
  - North Korea withdrew from the tournament before it began, and were relegated to Division II – Group B for 2024.
- April 3 – 9: Division III – Group A in Brașov
  - Final Round Robin placements: 1. Hong Kong, 2. Ukraine, 3. Lithuania, 4. Romania, 5. Bulgaria, 6. Estonia
  - Hong Kong was promoted to Division II – Group B for 2024.
  - Estonia was relegated to Division III – Group B for 2024.
- April 17 – 23: Division I – Group B in Suwon
  - Final Round Robin placements: 1. South Korea, 2. Poland, 3. Italy, 4. Slovenia, 5. Great Britain, 6. Kazakhstan
  - South Korea was promoted to Division I – Group A for 2024.
  - Kazakhstan was relegated to Division II – Group A for 2024.
- August 20 – 26: Division I – Group A in Shenzhen
  - Final Round Robin placements: 1. China, 2. Denmark, 3. Austria, 4. Netherlands, 5. Norway, 6. Slovakia
  - China and Denmark were promoted to the Top Division for 2024.
  - Slovakia was relegated to Division I – Group B for 2024.
  - Note: Tournament was originally scheduled for April 11 to 17; however, it was postponed, and later rescheduled for August 20 to 26.

=== IIHF World Championship ===
- May 12 – 28: 2023 IIHF World Championship in (Finland) Tampere and Riga
  - Canada defeated Germany, 5–2, to win their 28th World Championship title.
  - Latvia defeated the United States, 4–3 in overtime, to win the bronze medal.
  - Hungary and Slovenia were relegated to Division I – Group A for 2024.

==== Divisions ====
- February 27 – March 5: Division III – Group B in Sarajevo
  - Final Round Robin placements: 1. Kyrgyzstan, 2. Bosnia and Herzegovina, 3. Hong Kong, 4. Singapore, 5. Iran, 6. Malaysia
  - Kyrgyzstan was promoted to Division III – Group A for 2024.
  - Malaysia was relegated to Division IV for 2024.
- March 23 – 26: Division IV in Ulaanbaatar
  - Final Round Robin placements: 1. Philippines, 2. Mongolia, 3. Kuwait, 4. Indonesia
  - The Philippines were promoted to Division III – Group B for 2024.
- April 16 – 22: Division II – Group A in Madrid
  - Final Round Robin placements: 1. Spain, 2. Georgia, 3. Croatia 4. Australia, 5. Israel, 6. Iceland
  - Spain was promoted to Division I – Group B for 2024.
  - After the conclusion of the tournament, Georgia's results were invalidated by the IIHF, and they were relegated to Division II – Group B for 2024 in place of Iceland.
- April 17 – 23: Division III – Group A in Cape Town
  - Final Round Robin placements: 1. Chinese Taipei, 2. Turkmenistan, 3. South Africa, 4. Thailand, 5. Luxembourg, 6. North Korea
  - Chinese Taipei was promoted to Division II – Group B for 2024.
  - North Korea withdrew from the tournament before it began, and were relegated to Division III – Group B for 2024.
- April 17 – 23: Division II – Group B in Istanbul
  - Final Round Robin placements: 1. United Arab Emirates, 2. Belgium, 3. Bulgaria, 4. New Zealand, 5. Turkey, 6. Mexico
  - The United Arab Emirates were promoted to Division II – Group A for 2024.
  - Mexico was relegated to Division III – Group A for 2024.
- April 23 – 29: Division I – Group B in Tallinn
  - Final Round Robin placements: 1. Japan, 2. Ukraine, 3. China, 4. Estonia, 5. Netherlands, 6. Serbia
  - Japan was promoted to Division I – Group A for 2024.
  - Serbia was relegated to Division II – Group A for 2024.
- April 29 – May 5: Division I – Group A in (United Kingdom) Nottingham
  - Final Round Robin placements: 1. Great Britain, 2. Poland, 3. Italy, 4. South Korea, 5. Romania, 6. Lithuania
  - Great Britain and Poland were promoted to the Top Division for 2024.
  - Lithuania was relegated to Division I – Group B for 2024.

=== IIHF World U18 Championships ===
- April 20 – 30: 2023 IIHF World U18 Championships in (Switzerland) Basel and Porrentruy
  - The United States defeated Sweden, 3–2 in overtime, to win their 11th World U18 Championship title.
  - Canada defeated Slovakia, 4–3 in overtime, to win the bronze medal.
  - Germany was relegated to Division I – Group A for 2024.

==== Divisions ====
- March 12 – 18: Division III – Group A in Akureyri
  - Final Round Robin placements: 1. Israel, 2. Iceland, 3. Turkey, 4. Mexico, 5. Bosnia and Herzegovina, 6. Luxembourg
  - Israel was promoted to Division II – Group B for 2024.
  - Luxembourg was relegated to Division III – Group B for 2024.
- March 13 – 16: Division III – Group B in Cape Town
  - Final Round Robin placements: 1. New Zealand, 2. Hong Kong, 3. Thailand, 4. South Africa
  - New Zealand was promoted to Division III – Group A for 2024.
- March 27 – April 2: Division II – Group B in Sofia
  - Final Round Robin placements: 1. Netherlands, 2. China, 3. Chinese Taipei, 4. Bulgaria, 5. Australia, 6. Belgium
  - The Netherlands were promoted to Division II – Group A for 2024.
  - Belgium was relegated to Division III – Group A for 2024.
- April 9 – 15: Division II – Group A in Belgrade
  - Final Round Robin placements: 1. Lithuania, 2. Croatia, 3. Great Britain, 4. Serbia, 5. Romania, 6. Spain
  - Lithuania was promoted to Division I – Group B for 2024.
  - Spain was relegated to Division II – Group B for 2024.
- April 23 – 29: Division I – Group A in Angers
  - Final Round Robin placements: 1. Kazakhstan, 2. Denmark, 3. Japan, 4. Hungary, 5. Ukraine, 6. France
  - Kazakhstan was promoted to the Top Division for 2024.
  - France was relegated to Division I – Group B for 2024.
- April 25 – May 1: Division I – Group B in Bled
  - Final Round Robin placements: 1. Austria, 2. Slovenia, 3. Italy, 4. South Korea, 5. Estonia, 6. Poland
  - Austria was promoted to Division I – Group A for 2024.
  - Poland was relegated to Division II – Group A for 2024.

== National Hockey League (NHL) ==
- October 7, 2022 – April 14: 2022–23 NHL season
  - Presidents' Trophy and Eastern Conference regular-season winners: Boston Bruins
  - Western Conference regular-season winners: Vegas Golden Knights
  - Art Ross Trophy winner: Connor McDavid (Edmonton Oilers)
- January 2: 2023 Winter Classic at Fenway Park in Boston
  - The Boston Bruins defeated the Pittsburgh Penguins, with the score of 2–1.
- February 4: 2023 All-Star Game at FLA Live Arena in Sunrise
  - All-Star Game: Team Atlantic defeated Team Central, with the score of 7–5.
  - All-Star Game MVP: Matthew Tkachuk (Florida Panthers)
  - Accuracy Shooting: Brock Nelson (New York Islanders)
  - Breakaway Challenge: Sidney Crosby (Pittsburgh Penguins), Alexander Ovechkin (Washington Capitals), and Sergei Ovechkin
  - Fastest Skater: Andrei Svechnikov (Carolina Hurricanes)
  - Hardest Shot: Elias Pettersson (Vancouver Canucks)
  - Pitch 'n Puck: Nick Suzuki (Montreal Canadiens)
  - Splash Shot: Cale Makar and Mikko Rantanen (Colorado Avalanche)
  - Tendy Tandem: Connor Hellebuyck (Winnipeg Jets) and Juuse Saros (Nashville Predators)
- February 18: 2023 Stadium Series at Carter–Finley Stadium in Raleigh
  - The Carolina Hurricanes defeated the Washington Capitals, with the score of 4–1.
- April 17 – June 13: 2023 Stanley Cup playoffs
  - June 13: The Vegas Golden Knights defeat the Florida Panthers four games to one in the Stanley Cup Final to win their first Stanley Cup.
- June 28 & 29: 2023 NHL entry draft at Bridgestone Arena in Nashville
  - #1: Connor Bedard (to the Chicago Blackhawks from the Regina Pats)

== Kontinental Hockey League (KHL) ==
- September 1, 2022 – February 26: 2022–23 KHL season
  - Continental Cup and Western Conference regular-season winner: SKA Saint Petersburg
  - Eastern Conference regular-season winner: Ak Bars Kazan
- March 1 – April 29: 2023 Gagarin Cup playoffs
  - April 30: CSKA Moscow defeats Ak Bars Kazan four games to three in the Gagarin Cup Finals to win their second consecutive and third overall Gagarin Cup.

== North America ==
=== Minor league professional (AHL/ECHL/SPHL/FPHL/LNAH) ===
- October 14, 2022 – April 16: 2022–23 AHL season
  - Macgregor Kilpatrick Trophy & Pacific Division winners: Calgary Wranglers
  - Atlantic Division winners: Providence Bruins
  - North Division winners: Toronto Marlies
  - Central Division winners: Texas Stars
  - April 18 – June 21: 2023 Calder Cup playoffs
    - June 21: The Hershey Bears defeated the Coachella Valley Firebirds four games to three to win their 12th Calder Cup title.
- October 21, 2022 – April 16: 2022–23 ECHL season
  - Brabham Cup & Mountain Division winners: Idaho Steelheads
  - North Division winners: Newfoundland Growlers
  - South Division winners: South Carolina Stingrays
  - Central Division winners: Cincinnati Cyclones
  - April 19 – June 9: 2023 Kelly Cup playoffs
    - June 9: The Florida Everblades defeated the Idaho Steelheads in a four-game sweep to win their second consecutive and third overall Kelly Cup title.
- October 20, 2022 – April 8: 2022–23 SPHL season
  - William B. Coffey Trophy winners: Peoria Rivermen
  - April 13 – May 2: 2023 President's Cup playoffs
    - May 2: The Roanoke Rail Yard Dawgs defeated the Birmingham Bulls three games to one to win their first President's Cup title.
- October 13, 2022 – April 15: 2022–23 FPHL season
  - Continental Division winners: Carolina Thunderbirds
  - Empire Division winners & regular season champion: Danbury Hat Tricks
  - April 19 – May 14: 2023 Commissioner's Cup playoffs
    - May 14: The Danbury Hat Tricks defeated the Carolina Thunderbirds three games to two to win their first Commissioner's Cup title.
- October 7, 2022 – March 18: 2022–23 LNAH season
  - Regular season champion: Thetford Assurancia
  - March 22 – May 12: 2023 Vertdure Cup playoffs
    - May 12: Saint-Georges Cool FM 103.5 defeated Thetford Assurancia four games to two to win their second Vertdure Cup title.

=== Junior (OHL/QMJHL/USHL/WHL) ===
- September 22, 2022 – April 22: 2022–23 USHL season
  - Anderson Cup & Western Conference winners: Fargo Force
  - Eastern Conference winners: Chicago Steel
  - April 24 – May 19: 2023 Clark Cup playoffs
    - May 19: The Youngstown Phantoms defeat the Fargo Force in a three-game sweep to win their first Clark Cup title.
- September 22, 2022 – March 26: 2022–23 QMJHL season
  - Jean Rougeau Trophy & East Division winners: Quebec Remparts
  - Maritimes Division: Halifax Mooseheads
  - West Division: Gatineau Olympiques
  - Central Division: Sherbrooke Phoenix
  - March 31 – May 21: 2023 Gilles-Courteau Trophy playoffs
    - May 21: The Quebec Remparts defeat the Halifax Mooseheads four games to two to win their sixth Gilles-Courteau Trophy title.
  - December 14, 2023: The QMJHL officially changes its name to the Quebec Maritimes Junior Hockey League, replacing the term "Major," to better include the six Maritime-based teams in the league.
- September 23, 2022 – March 26: 2022–23 WHL season
  - Scotty Munro Memorial Trophy & East Division winners: Winnipeg Ice
  - Central Division winners: Red Deer Rebels
  - U.S. Division winners: Seattle Thunderbirds
  - B.C. Division winners: Kamloops Blazers
  - March 31 – May 19: 2023 WHL playoffs
    - May 19: The Seattle Thunderbirds defeat the Winnipeg Ice four games to one to win their second Ed Chynoweth Cup title.
- September 29, 2022 – March 26: 2022–23 OHL season
  - Hamilton Spectator Trophy & East Division winners: Ottawa 67's
  - Central Division: North Bay Battalion
  - Midwest Division: London Knights
  - West Division: Windsor Spitfires
  - March 30 – May 21: 2023 OHL playoffs
    - May 21: The Peterborough Petes defeat the London Knights four games to two to win their 10th J. Ross Robertson Cup title.
- May 26 – June 4: 2023 Memorial Cup at the Sandman Centre in Kamloops
  - June 4: The Quebec Remparts defeat the Seattle Thunderbirds, 5–0, to win their third Memorial Cup title.

=== Collegiate ===
==== NCAA–Division I (USA) ====
- March 9 – 19: 2023 NCAA Division I women's ice hockey tournament (Frozen Four at AMSOIL Arena in Duluth)
  - March 19: The Wisconsin Badgers defeat the Ohio State Buckeyes, 1–0, to win their seventh NCAA Division I Women's Ice Hockey title.
- March 23 – April 8: 2023 NCAA Division I men's ice hockey tournament (Frozen Four at Amalie Arena in Tampa)
  - April 8: The Quinnipiac Bobcats defeat the Minnesota Golden Gophers, 3–2 in overtime, to win their first NCAA Division I Men's Ice Hockey title.

==== U Sports (Canada) ====
- March 16 – 19: 2023 U Sports University Cup Tournament at the Eastlink Centre in Charlottetown
  - March 19: The UNB Reds defeat the Alberta Golden Bears, 3–0, to win their ninth University Cup title.

=== Women's professional (PHF) ===
- November 5, 2022 – March 12: 2022–23 PHF season
  - March 16 – March 26: 2023 PHF playoffs
    - March 26: The Toronto Six defeat the Minnesota Whitecaps, 4–3 in overtime, to win their first Isobel Cup title.
- June 29: The PHF is bought out by a partnership between the Mark Walter Group, BJK Enterprises, and the Professional Women's Hockey Players Association, ceasing operations in favor of a new league to begin the following year.
- August 29: The aforementioned ownership group announces the founding of the Professional Women's Hockey League (PWHL), with play set to begin in 2024.

== Europe ==
=== Tournaments ===
- September 1, 2022 – February 18: 2022–23 Champions Hockey League
  - (Finland) Tappara defeated (Sweden) Luleå HF, 3–2, to win their first Champions Hockey League title.
  - (Switzerland) EV Zug and (Sweden) Frölunda HC finished in joint third place, as the losing semi-finalists.
- September 23, 2022 – January 15: 2022–23 IIHF Continental Cup
  - Final Ranking: 1. (Slovakia) HK Nitra, 2. (France) Ducs d'Angers, 3. (Wales) Cardiff Devils, 4. (Italy) Asiago Hockey
- December 26 – 31: 2023 Spengler Cup in (Switzerland) Davos
  - (Switzerland) HC Davos defeat (Czech Republic) HC Dynamo Pardubice, 5–3, to win their 16th Spengler Cup.

=== Leagues ===
- September 14, 2022 – March 4: 2022–23 National League season
  - March 7 – April 27: 2023 National League playoffs
    - Genève-Servette HC defeats EHC Biel, four games to three, to win their first National League title.
- September 15, 2022 – March 5: 2022–23 Czech Extraliga season
  - Presidential Cup winner: Dynamo Pardubice
  - March 8 – April 28: 2023 Czech Extraliga playoffs
    - Oceláři Třinec defeats Mountfield HK four games to two to win their third consecutive and fifth overall Extraliga title.
- September 13, 2022 – March 11: 2022–23 Liiga season
  - March 13 – April 27: 2023 Liiga playoffs
    - Tappara defeats Pelicans, four games to one, to win their 12th Liiga title and 19th Finnish championship.
- September 15, 2022 – March 5: 2022–23 DEL season
  - The Bietigheim Steelers were relegated to the DEL2.
  - March 7 – April 27: 2023 DEL playoffs
    - EHC Red Bull München defeat ERC Ingolstadt, four games to one, to win their fourth DEL title.
- September 17, 2022 – March 9: 2022–23 SHL season
  - Brynäs IF were relegated to the HockeyAllsvenskan.
  - March 11 – April 24: 2023 SHL playoffs
    - The Växjö Lakers defeat Skellefteå AIK, four games to one, to win their fourth Le Mat Trophy title.

== Asia ==
- September 3, 2022 – March 5: 2022–23 Asia League Ice Hockey season
  - Leader's Flag winners: HL Anyang
  - PSK Sakhalin were expelled from the league before the season due to the 2022 Russian invasion of Ukraine.
  - March 9 – March 25: 2023 ALIH playoffs
    - HL Anyang defeated Red Eagles Hokkaido, three games to two, to win their seventh Asia League championship.
- March 11 – 17: 2023 IIHF U18 Asia and Oceania Championship in Ulaanbaatar, Mongolia
  - Final Round Robin placements: 1. Uzbekistan, 2. Turkmenistan, 3. Mongolia, 4. United Arab Emirates, 5. Thailand, 6. Iran
- April 30 – May 7: 2023 IIHF Women's Asia and Oceania Championship in Bangkok
  - Thailand defeated Iran, 3–1, to win their second Women's Asia and Oceania Championship title.
  - Singapore defeated India, 3–1, to win the bronze medal.
- May 7 – 13: 2023 Arab Cup in Kuwait City
  - Lebanon defeated Kuwait, 9–4, to win their first Arab Cup title.
  - Oman defeated Bahrain, 6–3, to win the bronze medal.

== Other tournaments ==
- May 2 – 6: 2023 IIHF Development Cup in (Slovakia) Bratislava
  - Final Ranking: 1. Liechtenstein, 2. Argentina, 3. Colombia, 4. Ireland, 5. Portugal
- November 6 – 12: 2024 IIHF Women's Development Cup in (Poland) Krynica Zdrój
  - Final Ranking: 1. Colombia, 2. Argentina, 3. Iran, 4. Ireland

== Deaths ==
=== January ===
- Georg Eberl, 86, German Olympic right wing (1960)
- Bobby Rivard, 83, Canadian forward (Pittsburgh Penguins)
- Gino Odjick, 52, Canadian left wing (Vancouver Canucks, New York Islanders, Montreal Canadiens)
- Brian Perry, 78, British-born Canadian left wing (Oakland Seals, New York Islanders, Buffalo Sabres)
- Bob Chrystal, 92, Canadian defenceman (New York Rangers)
- Bobby Hull, 84, Canadian Hall of Fame left wing (Chicago Blackhawks, Winnipeg Jets, Hartford Whalers), Stanley Cup champion (1961)

=== February ===
- Jozef Čapla, 84, Slovak defenceman (HC Slovan Bratislava, HC Dukla Jihlava, Augsburger EV)
- Don Blackburn, 84, Canadian left wing (Philadelphia Flyers, New York Islanders, New York Rangers)
- Arto Heiskanen, 59, Finnish left wing (Porin Ässät, Lukko, Albatros de Brest)
- Paul Jerrard, 57, Canadian defenceman (Minnesota North Stars) and coach (Colorado Avalanche, Calgary Flames)
- Dieter Pürschel, 82, German Olympic goaltender (1968)

=== March ===
- Sepp Reif, 85, German Olympic player (1960, 1964, 1968)
- Don Burgess, 76, Canadian left wing (Philadelphia Blazers, Vancouver Blazers, San Diego Mariners)
- Dave Gardner, 70, Canadian centre (Montreal Canadiens, St. Louis Blues, California Golden Seals)
- George Nagobads, 101, Latvian-born American team physician (United States national team, Minnesota Golden Gophers)

=== April ===
- Ken Girard, 86, Canadian right wing (Toronto Maple Leafs)
- Tom Yurkovich, 87, American Olympic goaltender (1964)
- Raymond Sawada, 38, Canadian right wing (Dallas Stars)
- Bengt Lindqvist, 89, Swedish Olympic player (1960)
- Eero Saari, 94, Finnish Olympic forward (1952)
- Mihails Vasiļonoks, 74, Latvian goaltender (Dinamo Riga, Soviet Union national team), coach, and executive (HK Liepājas Metalurgs)

=== May ===
- Petr Klíma, 58, Czech forward (Detroit Red Wings, Edmonton Oilers, Tampa Bay Lightning), Stanley Cup champion (1990)
- Ray Fortin, 82, Canadian defenceman (St. Louis Blues)
- Vic Stasiuk, 93, Canadian left wing (Boston Bruins, Detroit Red Wings) and coach (Philadelphia Flyers), Stanley Cup champion (1952, 1954, 1955)
- Gerry Hart, 75, Canadian defenceman (Detroit Red Wings, New York Islanders, St. Louis Blues)
- Weldon Olson, 90, American Olympic player, Olympic gold medalist (1960)
- Marv Edwards, 88, Canadian goaltender (Pittsburgh Penguins, Toronto Maple Leafs)
- Teppo Rastio, 89, Finnish ice hockey (Lukko, Ilves) and football (national team) player
- Lou Marcon, 88, Canadian defenceman (Detroit Red Wings, Edmonton Flyers, Pittsburgh Hornets)

=== June ===
- Willie Marshall, 91, Canadian centre (Hershey Bears, Toronto Maple Leafs, Baltimore Clippers)
- Floyd Martin, 93, Canadian right wing, Olympic silver medalist (1960)
- Dmitri Tarasov, 44, Russian left wing (Amur Khabarovsk, Salavat Yulaev Ufa, Dynamo Moscow)
- Leo Insam, 48, Italian Olympic defenceman (1994, 1998)
- Rob Palmer, 66, Canadian defenceman (Los Angeles Kings, New Jersey Devils)

=== July ===
- Mel Wakabayashi, 80, Canadian-Japanese centre (Michigan Wolverines, Memphis Wings, Johnstown Jets) and coach
- Yrjö Hakala, 91, Finnish Olympic forward (1952, 1960)
- Billy MacMillan, 80, Canadian right wing (New York Islanders, Toronto Maple Leafs) and coach (New Jersey Devils), Olympic bronze medalist (1968)
- Lew Morrison, 75, Canadian right wing (Pittsburgh Penguins, Philadelphia Flyers, Washington Capitals)
- Mike Hammond, 33, British forward (Nottingham Panthers)
- Brian O'Neill, 94, Canadian Hall of Fame executive
- Joe Kowal, 67, Canadian left wing (Buffalo Sabres, Rochester Americans, Hershey Bears)
- Wayne Maxner, 80, Canadian left wing (Boston Bruins) and coach (Detroit Red Wings)
- Timo Hirvonen, 49, Finnish left wing (Kiekko-Espoo, SaiPa) and coach
- Eddie Long, 90, Canadian right wing (Louisville Rebels, Fort Wayne Komets)

=== August ===
- Bob Murdoch, 76, Canadian defenceman (Los Angeles Kings, Montreal Canadiens) and coach (Winnipeg Jets), Stanley Cup champion (1973)
- Gilles Gilbert, 74, Canadian goaltender (Minnesota North Stars, Boston Bruins, Detroit Red Wings)
- Leigh Verstraete, 61, Canadian right wing (Toronto Maple Leafs)
- Bobby Baun, 86, Canadian defenceman (Toronto Maple Leafs, Detroit Red Wings, Oakland Seals), four-time Stanley Cup champion (1962–1964,1967)
- Rodion Amirov, 21, Russian left wing (Salavat Yulaev Ufa)
- Rick Jeanneret, 81, Canadian radio broadcaster (Sabres Hockey Network), Foster Hewitt Memorial Award winner
- Yvon Pedneault, 77, Canadian television broadcaster (TVA, Réseau des Sports, TQS)

=== September ===
- Morgan Samuelsson, 55, Swedish centre (Luleå HF, Södertälje SK, AIK IF) and coach
- Brad Maxwell, 66, Canadian defenceman (Minnesota North Stars, Toronto Maple Leafs, Vancouver Canucks)
- Peter Gustavsson, 65, Swedish left wing (Colorado Rockies, Fort Worth Texans)
- Kjell-Rune Milton, 75, Swedish defenceman (Frölunda, Kölner Haie)
- Chuck Hamilton, 84, Canadian right wing (Montreal Canadiens, St. Louis Blues, Hershey Bears)
- Henry Boucha, 72, American centre (Detroit Red Wings, Minnesota North Stars), Olympic silver medalist (1972)
- Krzysztof Bujar, 61, Polish right wing (Naprzód Janów) and Olympian (1992)
- Nic Kerdiles, 29, American left wing (Anaheim Ducks)

=== October ===
- Dunc Wilson, 75, Canadian goaltender (Vancouver Canucks, Toronto Maple Leafs, Pittsburgh Penguins)
- Gerry Penner, 89, Canadian left wing (Trail Smoke Eaters, New Westminster Royals, Seattle Americans), World Championships gold medalist (1961)
- Corby Adams, 83, Canadian left wing (Clarkson University, Barrie Flyers)
- Ed Sandford, 95, Canadian left wing (Boston Bruins, Chicago Black Hawks)
- Denis Carufel, 69, Canadian defenceman (Sorel Éperviers, Maine Nordiques)
- Adam Johnson, 29, American forward (Pittsburgh Penguins, Nottingham Panthers) dies after an on-ice incident results in his neck being cut from a skate.
- Jerzy Mruk, 85, Polish goaltender (Cracovia) and coach (Unia Oświęcim, Polish national team).

=== November ===
- Matti Reunamäki, 83, Finnish forward (Koovee) and Olympian (1964, 1968)
- Roman Čechmánek, 52, Czech goaltender (Los Angeles Kings, Philadelphia Flyers), Olympic gold medalist (1998), World Championships gold medalist (1996, 1999, 2000)
- George Chin, 94, Canadian right wing (Windsor Spitfires, University of Michigan, Nottingham Panthers)

=== December ===
- Bruce Dickson, 92, Canadian right wing (Medicine Hat Tigers, Edmonton Oil Kings, Edmonton Mercurys), Olympic gold medalist (1952)
- Jack Martin, 83, Canadian centre (Toronto Maple Leafs)
- Hartland Monahan, 72, Canadian right wing (Washington Capitals, Los Angeles Kings, St. Louis Blues)
- Mike Urquhart, 65, Canadian-British left wing (Kamloops Chiefs, Nottingham Panthers, Chelmsford Chieftains) and coach (Nottingham Lions, British national team)
- Randy Legge, 77, Canadian defenceman (New York Rangers, Michigan Stags/Baltimore Blades, San Diego Mariners)
- Gene Carr, 72, Canadian centre (New York Rangers, Los Angeles Kings)
- Reggie Savage, 53, Canadian right wing (Washington Capitals, Quebec Nordiques)

== See also ==
- 2022 in ice hockey
- 2024 in ice hockey
- 2023 in ice sports
