= 2025 IIHF U18 Women's World Championship Division II =

International youth ice hockey tournament

Tournament details
- Host countries: Latvia; Turkey
- Venues: 2 (in 2 host cities)
- Dates: 20–26 January 2025; 18–23 January 2025
- Teams: 11

The 2025 IIHF U18 Women's World Championship Division II consisted of two international under-18 women's ice hockey tournaments organized by the International Ice Hockey Federation (IIHF). Division II A represented the fourth tier and Division II B the fifth tier of the IIHF U18 Women's World Championship.

== Group A tournament ==
2025 IIHF U18 Women's World Championship Division II Group A

Tournament details
- Host country: Latvia
- City: Riga
- Venue: 1 (in 1 host city)
- Dates: 20–26 January 2025
- Teams: 6

Tournament statistics
- Games played: 15
- Goals scored: 128 (8.53 per game)
- Attendance: 3,962 (264 per game)
- Scoring leader: (Kazakhstan) Sofiya Zubkova (18 points)

Official website
- www.iihf.com

The Division II Group A tournament was played in Riga, Latvia, from 20 to 26 January 2025.

=== Participating teams ===
Team	Qualification
Chinese Taipei	Placed 6th in Division I B last year and were relegated
Great Britain	Placed 2nd in Division II A last year
Netherlands	Hosts; placed 3rd in Division II A last year
Latvia	Placed 4th in Division II A last year
Kazakhstan	Placed 5th in Division II A last year
New Zealand	Placed 1st in Division II B last year and were promoted

=== Standings ===
Pos	Team	Pld	W	OTW	OTL	L	GF	GA	GD	Pts	Promotion or relegation
1	Great Britain	5	5	0	0	0	35	6	+29	15	Promoted to the 2026 Division I B
2	Kazakhstan	5	4	0	0	1	39	10	+29	12	
3	Latvia (H)	5	3	0	0	2	33	12	+21	9	
4	Netherlands	5	2	0	0	3	5	21	−16	6	
5	New Zealand	5	1	0	0	4	8	43	−35	3	
6	Chinese Taipei	5	0	0	0	5	8	36	−28	0	Relegated to the 2026 Division II B

Source: IIHF
Rules for classification: 1) points; 2) head-to-head points; 3) head-to-head goal difference; 4) head-to-head number of goals scored; 5) result against closest best-ranked team outside tied teams; 6) result against second-best ranked team outside tied teams; 7) seeding before tournament.
(H) Host

=== Match results ===
All times are local (Eastern European Time – UTC+2).

20 January 2025; 12:30	Netherlands	2–1 (1–1, 1–0, 0–0)	Chinese Taipei	Volvo Sportcenter, Riga; Attendance: 114

Game reference
			Referee: (Finland) Sini Kauhanen; Linesmen: (Austria) Manuela Lehnhart (Poland) Monika Szpyt-Jucha
10 min	Penalties	10 min	Referee: (Finland) Sini Kauhanen; Linesmen: (Austria) Manuela Lehnhart (Poland) Monika Szpyt-Jucha
27	Shots	32	Referee: (Finland) Sini Kauhanen; Linesmen: (Austria) Manuela Lehnhart (Poland) Monika Szpyt-Jucha

20 January 2025; 16:00	Great Britain	3–1 (0–0, 1–1, 2–0)	Kazakhstan	Volvo Sportcenter, Riga; Attendance: 135

Game reference
			Referee: (Hungary) Csilla Peter; Linesmen: (Netherlands) Fabienne Gooijer (Iceland) Elva Hjalmarsdottir
6 min	Penalties	6 min	Referee: (Hungary) Csilla Peter; Linesmen: (Netherlands) Fabienne Gooijer (Iceland) Elva Hjalmarsdottir
40	Shots	22	Referee: (Hungary) Csilla Peter; Linesmen: (Netherlands) Fabienne Gooijer (Iceland) Elva Hjalmarsdottir

20 January 2025; 19:30	New Zealand	0–7 (0–2, 0–2, 0–3)	Latvia	Volvo Sportcenter, Riga; Attendance: 490

Game reference
			Referee: (Germany) Harriet Weegh; Linesmen: (Germany) Natalie Bertl (Norway) Elise-Marie Mortensen
6 min	Penalties	2 min	Referee: (Germany) Harriet Weegh; Linesmen: (Germany) Natalie Bertl (Norway) Elise-Marie Mortensen
9	Shots	55	Referee: (Germany) Harriet Weegh; Linesmen: (Germany) Natalie Bertl (Norway) Elise-Marie Mortensen

21 January 2025; 12:30	Great Britain	3–0 (1–0, 0–0, 2–0)	Netherlands	Volvo Sportcenter, Riga; Attendance: 197

Game reference
			Referee: (Hungary) Csilla Peter; Linesmen: (Iceland) Elva Hjalmarsdottir (Poland) Monika Szpyt-Jucha
4 min	Penalties	2 min	Referee: (Hungary) Csilla Peter; Linesmen: (Iceland) Elva Hjalmarsdottir (Poland) Monika Szpyt-Jucha
41	Shots	13	Referee: (Hungary) Csilla Peter; Linesmen: (Iceland) Elva Hjalmarsdottir (Poland) Monika Szpyt-Jucha

21 January 2025; 16:00	Kazakhstan	14–3 (5–0, 5–1, 4–2)	New Zealand	Volvo Sportcenter, Riga; Attendance: 78

Game reference
			Referee: (Philippines) Georgie Ann Regenica; Linesmen: (Germany) Natalie Bertl (Norway) Elise-Marie Mortensen
4 min	Penalties	8 min	Referee: (Philippines) Georgie Ann Regenica; Linesmen: (Germany) Natalie Bertl (Norway) Elise-Marie Mortensen
60	Shots	17	Referee: (Philippines) Georgie Ann Regenica; Linesmen: (Germany) Natalie Bertl (Norway) Elise-Marie Mortensen

21 January 2025; 19:30	Chinese Taipei	2–14 (1–6, 1–6, 0–2)	Latvia	Volvo Sportcenter, Riga; Attendance: 420

Game reference
			Referee: (Germany) Harriet Weegh; Linesmen: (Netherlands) Fabienne Gooijer (United Kingdom) Felicity Munroe
6 min	Penalties	2 min	Referee: (Germany) Harriet Weegh; Linesmen: (Netherlands) Fabienne Gooijer (United Kingdom) Felicity Munroe
27	Shots	53	Referee: (Germany) Harriet Weegh; Linesmen: (Netherlands) Fabienne Gooijer (United Kingdom) Felicity Munroe

23 January 2025; 12:30	Great Britain	16–1 (5–0, 6–0, 5–1)	New Zealand	Volvo Sportcenter, Riga; Attendance: 123

Game reference
			Referee: (Philippines) Georgie Ann Regenica; Linesmen: (Netherlands) Fabienne Gooijer (Austria) Manuela Lehnhart
4 min	Penalties	8 min	Referee: (Philippines) Georgie Ann Regenica; Linesmen: (Netherlands) Fabienne Gooijer (Austria) Manuela Lehnhart
69	Shots	10	Referee: (Philippines) Georgie Ann Regenica; Linesmen: (Netherlands) Fabienne Gooijer (Austria) Manuela Lehnhart

23 January 2025; 16:00	Chinese Taipei	0–6 (0–4, 0–1, 0–1)	Kazakhstan	Volvo Sportcenter, Riga; Attendance: 75

Game reference
			Referee: (Germany) Harriet Weegh; Linesmen: (Iceland) Elva Hjalmarsdottir (Norway) Elise-Marie Mortensen
29 min	Penalties	6 min	Referee: (Germany) Harriet Weegh; Linesmen: (Iceland) Elva Hjalmarsdottir (Norway) Elise-Marie Mortensen
22	Shots	63	Referee: (Germany) Harriet Weegh; Linesmen: (Iceland) Elva Hjalmarsdottir (Norway) Elise-Marie Mortensen

23 January 2025; 19:30	Netherlands	0–6 (0–2, 0–2, 0–2)	Latvia	Volvo Sportcenter, Riga; Attendance: 420

Game reference
			Referee: (Finland) Sini Kauhanen; Linesmen: (Germany) Natalie Bertl (United Kingdom) Felicity Munroe
10 min	Penalties	6 min	Referee: (Finland) Sini Kauhanen; Linesmen: (Germany) Natalie Bertl (United Kingdom) Felicity Munroe
13	Shots	36	Referee: (Finland) Sini Kauhanen; Linesmen: (Germany) Natalie Bertl (United Kingdom) Felicity Munroe

25 January 2025; 12:30	New Zealand	4–3 (4–1, 0–2, 0–0)	Chinese Taipei	Volvo Sportcenter, Riga; Attendance: 89

Game reference
8 min	Penalties	4 min
27	Shots	43

25 January 2025; 16:00	Kazakhstan	11–0 (4–0, 3–0, 4–0)	Netherlands	Volvo Sportcenter, Riga; Attendance: 132

Game reference
10 min	Penalties	4 min
52	Shots	17

25 January 2025; 19:30	Latvia	2–3 (1–1, 1–1, 0–1)	Great Britain	Volvo Sportcenter, Riga; Attendance: 712

Game reference
4 min	Penalties	10 min
28	Shots	23

26 January 2025; 12:30	Netherlands	3–0 (2–0, 1–0, 0–0)	New Zealand	Volvo Sportcenter, Riga; Attendance: 112

Game reference
2 min	Penalties	8 min
31	Shots	12

26 January 2025; 16:00	Chinese Taipei	2–10 (1–3, 0–3, 1–4)	Great Britain	Volvo Sportcenter, Riga; Attendance: 115

Game reference
4 min	Penalties	6 min
16	Shots	43

26 January 2025; 19:30	Latvia	4–7 (2–2, 2–1, 0–4)	Kazakhstan	Volvo Sportcenter, Riga; Attendance: 750

Game reference
8 min	Penalties	6 min
22	Shots	49

=== Statistics ===
==== Scoring leaders ====
List shows the top skaters sorted by points, then goals.

Rank	Player	GP	G	A	Pts	+/−	PIM	POS
1	(Kazakhstan) Sofiya Zubkova	5	9	9	18	+13	2	F
2	(Kazakhstan) Sofiya Muravyeva	5	9	4	13	+9	0	F
3	(Latvia) Šarlote Štāle	5	6	7	13	+10	0	F
4	(United Kingdom) Ruby Newlands	5	5	8	13	+10	0	F
5	(Kazakhstan) Kira Krukholskaya	5	4	8	12	+11	0	F
6	(Latvia) Hanna Strause	5	8	3	11	+9	0	F
7	(Kazakhstan) Zlatotsveta Feoktistova	5	7	4	11	+9	4	F
8	(Latvia) Kjara Paula Želubovska	5	1	10	11	+11	2	F
9	(United Kingdom) Emma Lamberton	5	5	5	10	+7	0	F
10	(Kazakhstan) Sofiya Rakovskaya	5	2	8	10	+9	6	F

GP = Games played; G = Goals; A = Assists; Pts = Points; +/− = Plus/minus; PIM = Penalties in minutes; POS = Position
Source: IIHF

==== Leading goaltenders ====
Only the top five goaltenders, based on save percentage, who have played at least 40% of their team's minutes, are included in this list.

Rank	Player	TOI	GA	GAA	SA	Sv%	SO
1	(United Kingdom) Lucy Holliday	200:00	3	0.90	65	95.38	1
2	(Kazakhstan) Veronika Ageyeva	253:40	7	1.66	104	93.27	2
3	(Latvia) Megija Kaže	119:42	6	3.01	68	91.18	0
4	(Latvia) Nikola Seleviča	178:25	5	1.68	52	90.38	1
5	(Netherlands) Robyn Verkaik	191:16	13	4.08	105	87.62	1

TOI = Time on ice (minutes:seconds); SA = Shots against; GA = Goals against; GAA = Goals against average; Sv% = Save percentage; SO = Shutouts
Source: IIHF

==== Awards ====
- Best players selected by the directorate:
  - Best Goaltender: (United Kingdom) Lucy Holliday
  - Best Defender: (Latvia) Emīlija Jakovļeva
  - Best Forward: (United Kingdom) Ruby Newlands

Source: IIHF.com

== Group B tournament ==
2025 IIHF U18 Women's World Championship Division II Group B

Tournament details
- Host country: Turkey
- City: Istanbul
- Venue: 1 (in 1 host city)
- Dates: 18–23 January 2025
- Teams: 5

Tournament statistics
- Games played: 10
- Goals scored: 71 (7.1 per game)
- Attendance: 5,710 (571 per game)
- Scoring leader: (Iceland) Friðrika Magnúsdóttir (15 points)

Official website
- www.iihf.com

The Division II Group B tournament was played in Istanbul, Turkey, from 18 to 23 January 2025.

=== Participating teams ===
Team	Qualification
Turkey	Hosts; placed 6th in Division II A last year and were relegated
Iceland	Placed 2nd in Division II B last year
Belgium	Placed 3rd in Division II B last year
Mexico	Placed 4th in Division II B last year
South Africa	Placed 6th in Division II B last year

=== Standings ===
Pos	Team	Pld	W	OTW	OTL	L	GF	GA	GD	Pts	Promotion
1	Turkey (H)	4	4	0	0	0	20	1	+19	12	Promoted to the 2026 Division II A
2	Iceland	4	3	0	0	1	29	3	+26	9	
3	Belgium	4	1	1	0	2	13	13	0	5	
4	Mexico	4	1	0	1	2	8	9	−1	4	
5	South Africa	4	0	0	0	4	1	45	−44	0	

Source: IIHF
Rules for classification: 1) points; 2) head-to-head points; 3) head-to-head goal difference; 4) head-to-head number of goals scored; 5) result against closest best-ranked team outside tied teams; 6) result against second-best ranked team outside tied teams; 7) seeding before tournament.
(H) Host

=== Match results ===
All times are local (Turkey Time – UTC+3).

18 January 2025; 16:00	South Africa	0–17 (0–5, 0–6, 0–6)	Iceland	Zeytinburnu Ice Rink, Istanbul; Attendance: 80

Game reference
4 min	Penalties	6 min
3	Shots	87

18 January 2025; 19:00	Turkey	4–0 (0–0, 2–0, 2–0)	Belgium	Zeytinburnu Ice Rink, Istanbul; Attendance: 850

Game reference
6 min	Penalties	8 min
36	Shots	10

19 January 2025; 16:00	Mexico	5–0 (3–0, 0–0, 2–0)	South Africa	Zeytinburnu Ice Rink, Istanbul; Attendance: 90

Game reference
6 min	Penalties	0 min
52	Shots	6

20 January 2025; 16:00	Iceland	7–0 (3–0, 3–0, 1–0)	Belgium	Zeytinburnu Ice Rink, Istanbul; Attendance: 75

Game reference
4 min	Penalties	6 min
46	Shots	9

20 January 2025; 19:00	Mexico	1–2 (1–0, 0–2, 0–0)	Turkey	Zeytinburnu Ice Rink, Istanbul; Attendance: 900

Game reference
8 min	Penalties	4 min
14	Shots	28

21 January 2025; 19:00	South Africa	0–12 (0–6, 0–4, 0–2)	Turkey	Zeytinburnu Ice Rink, Istanbul; Attendance: 1,150

Game reference
6 min	Penalties	2 min
4	Shots	76

22 January 2025; 16:00	Belgium	11–1 (4–1, 3–0, 4–0)	South Africa	Zeytinburnu Ice Rink, Istanbul; Attendance: 50

Game reference
2 min	Penalties	2 min
54	Shots	16

22 January 2025; 19:00	Iceland	5–1 (2–0, 1–1, 2–0)	Mexico	Zeytinburnu Ice Rink, Istanbul; Attendance: 71

Game reference
12 min	Penalties	10 min
45	Shots	13

23 January 2025; 16:00	Belgium	2–1 GWS (0–0, 1–1, 0–0) (OT: 0–0) (SO: 1–0)	Mexico	Zeytinburnu Ice Rink, Istanbul; Attendance: 94

Game reference
4 min	Penalties	10 min
41	Shots	27

23 January 2025; 19:00	Turkey	2–0 (1–0, 0–0, 1–0)	Iceland	Zeytinburnu Ice Rink, Istanbul; Attendance: 2,350

Game reference
0 min	Penalties	6 min
25	Shots	23

=== Awards and Statistics ===
==== Scoring leaders ====
List shows the top skaters sorted by points, then goals.

Rank	Player	GP	G	A	Pts	+/−	PIM	POS
1	(Iceland) Friðrika Magnúsdóttir	4	7	8	15	+15	0	F
2	(Iceland) Sólrún Arnardóttir	4	3	9	12	+12	4	F
3	(Iceland) Kolbrún Björnsdóttir	4	5	5	10	+13	2	F
4	(Iceland) Magdalena Sulova	4	4	4	8	+8	2	D
5	(Turkey) Eda Seçen	4	2	6	8	+11	2	F
6	(Iceland) Eyrún Garðarsdóttir	4	3	2	5	+4	6	F
6	(Belgium) Linnore Saunders	4	3	2	5	–2	6	F
8	(Turkey) Tan Göksal	4	4	0	4	+11	0	D
9	(Turkey) Dolunay Erbakan	4	3	1	4	+7	0	F
10	(Turkey) Ece Erasçı	4	1	3	4	+7	2	D

GP = Games played; G = Goals; A = Assists; Pts = Points; +/− = Plus/minus; PIM = Penalties in minutes; POS = Position
Source: IIHF

==== Leading goaltenders ====
Only the top five goaltenders, based on save percentage, who have played at least 40% of their team's minutes, are included in this list.

Rank	Player	TOI	GA	GAA	SA	Sv%	SO
1	(Turkey) Erva Kanat	200:00	1	0.30	47	97.87	2
2	(Iceland) Diana Óskarsdóttir	195:28	3	0.92	45	93.33	0
3	(Mexico) Sofia Hernández	238:53	8	2.01	117	93.16	0
4	(Belgium) Anouk Belmans	196:26	12	3.67	102	88.24	0
5	(South Africa) Hayley Chrissopoulos	179:03	26	8.71	182	85.71	0

TOI = Time on ice (minutes:seconds); SA = Shots against; GA = Goals against; GAA = Goals against average; Sv% = Save percentage; SO = Shutouts
Source: IIHF

==== Awards ====
- Best players selected by the directorate:
  - Best Goaltender: (Turkey) Erva Kanat
  - Best Defender: (Belgium) Ans van Hoof
  - Best Forward: (Iceland) Friðrika Magnúsdóttir

Source: IIHF.com
