= 2024 IIHF U18 Women's World Championship Division II =

Women's ice hockey tournament

2024 IIHF World Women's U18 Championship Division II
Tournament details
- Host countries: Netherlands; Bulgaria
- Venues: 2 (in 2 host cities)
- Dates: 15–21 January 2024; 8–14 January 2024
- Teams: 12

The 2024 IIHF U18 Women's World Championship Division II was a pair of international under-18 women's ice hockey tournaments organized by the International Ice Hockey Federation (IIHF). Divisions II A and II B represent the fourth and the fifth tier of competition at the 2024 IIHF World Women's U18 Championship.

== Group A tournament ==
2024 IIHF World Women's U18 Championship Division II A

Tournament details
- Host country: Netherlands
- City: Heerenveen
- Venue: 1 (in 1 host city)
- Dates: 15–21 January 2024
- Teams: 6

Tournament statistics
- Games played: 15
- Goals scored: 110 (7.33 per game)
- Attendance: 4,370 (291 per game)
- Scoring leader: (China) Wang Yifan (12 points)

Official website
- www.iihf.com

The Division II Group A tournament was played in Heerenveen, Netherlands, from 15 to 21 January 2024.

=== Participating teams ===
Team	Qualification
China	6th place in 2023 World Championship Division I B and were relegated
Latvia	2nd place in 2023 World Championship Division II A
Netherlands	Hosts; 3rd place in 2023 World Championship Division II A
Great Britain	4th place in 2023 World Championship Division II A
Turkey	5th place in 2023 World Championship Division II A
Kazakhstan	1st place in 2023 World Championship Division II B and were promoted

=== Standings ===
Pos	Team	Pld	W	OTW	OTL	L	GF	GA	GD	Pts	Promotion or relegation
1	China	5	5	0	0	0	48	3	+45	15	Promoted to the 2025 Division I B
2	Great Britain	5	4	0	0	1	22	7	+15	12	
3	Netherlands (H)	5	2	1	0	2	19	29	−10	8	
4	Latvia	5	2	0	1	2	10	13	−3	7	
5	Kazakhstan	5	1	0	0	4	11	20	−9	3	
6	Turkey	5	0	0	0	5	0	38	−38	0	Relegated to the 2025 Division II B

Source: IIHF
Rules for classification: 1) points; 2) head-to-head points; 3) head-to-head goal difference; 4) head-to-head number of goals scored; 5) result against closest best-ranked team outside tied teams; 6) result against second-best ranked team outside tied teams; 7) seeding before tournament.
(H) Host

=== Results ===
All times are local (Central European Time – UTC+1).

15 January 2024; 13:00	Latvia	3–0 (1–0, 0–0, 2–0)	Turkey	Thialf IJsstadion, Heerenveen; Attendance: 100

Game reference
12 min	Penalties	14 min
32	Shots	16

15 January 2024; 16:30	Kazakhstan	0–4 (0–3, 0–0, 0–1)	Great Britain	Thialf IJsstadion, Heerenveen; Attendance: 100

Game reference
8 min	Penalties	14 min
15	Shots	29

15 January 2024; 20:00	Netherlands	0–18 (0–6, 0–6, 0–6)	China	Thialf IJsstadion, Heerenveen; Attendance: 200

Game reference
4 min	Penalties	2 min
10	Shots	56

16 January 2024; 13:00	Turkey	0–6 (0–3, 0–3, 0–0)	Kazakhstan	Thialf IJsstadion, Heerenveen

Game reference
4 min	Penalties	2 min
8	Shots	28

16 January 2024; 16:30	China	6–2 (3–2, 1–0, 2–0)	Great Britain	Thialf IJsstadion, Heerenveen; Attendance: 120

Game reference
8 min	Penalties	10 min
31	Shots	20

16 January 2024; 20:00	Latvia	3–4 GWS (1–1, 1–1, 1–1) (OT: 0–0) (SO: 0–1)	Netherlands	Thialf IJsstadion, Heerenveen; Attendance: 450

Game reference
8 min	Penalties	8 min
34	Shots	24

18 January 2024; 13:00	China	11–0 (2–0, 6–0, 3–0)	Turkey	Thialf IJsstadion, Heerenveen; Attendance: 100

Game reference
2 min	Penalties	2 min
65	Shots	1

18 January 2024; 16:30	Latvia	2–1 (1–0, 1–0, 0–1)	Kazakhstan	Thialf IJsstadion, Heerenveen; Attendance: 100

Game reference
27 min	Penalties	2 min
24	Shots	25

18 January 2024; 20:00	Netherlands	0–4 (0–2, 0–1, 0–1)	Great Britain	Thialf IJsstadion, Heerenveen; Attendance: 450

Game reference
10 min	Penalties	4 min
4	Shots	51

20 January 2024; 13:00	Great Britain	3–1 (1–0, 2–1, 0–0)	Latvia	Thialf IJsstadion, Heerenveen; Attendance: 100

Game reference
4 min	Penalties	2 min
13	Shots	10

20 January 2024; 16:30	Turkey	0–9 (0–6, 0–2, 0–1)	Netherlands	Thialf IJsstadion, Heerenveen; Attendance: 450

Game reference
6 min	Penalties	8 min
10	Shots	25

20 January 2024; 20:00	Kazakhstan	0–8 (0–3, 0–2, 0–3)	China	Thialf IJsstadion, Heerenveen; Attendance: 100

Game reference
0 min	Penalties	4 min
11	Shots	52

21 January 2024; 13:00	Great Britain	9–0 (4–0, 2–0, 3–0)	Turkey	Thialf IJsstadion, Heerenveen; Attendance: 150

Game reference
0 min	Penalties	4 min
55	Shots	3

21 January 2024; 16:30	Netherlands	6–4 (3–0, 1–2, 2–2)	Kazakhstan	Thialf IJsstadion, Heerenveen; Attendance: 500

Game reference
6 min	Penalties	12 min
35	Shots	27

21 January 2024; 20:00	China	5–1 (0–0, 2–1, 3–0)	Latvia	Thialf IJsstadion, Heerenveen; Attendance: 250

Game reference
14 min	Penalties	8 min
21	Shots	13

=== Awards and statistics ===
==== Scoring leaders ====
List shows the top skaters sorted by points, then goals.

Rank	Player	GP	G	A	Pts	+/−	PIM	POS
1	(China) Wang Yifan	5	10	2	12	+12	2	F
2	(China) Meng Fancong	5	1	11	12	+15	8	F
3	(Netherlands) Emily Olsthoorn	5	7	4	11	+6	4	F
4	(China) Zhao Ziyu	5	4	6	10	+15	0	F
5	(China) Hu Jiayi	5	3	6	9	+8	0	F
6	(Netherlands) Danique Koghee	5	3	5	8	+4	2	F
7	(China) Wang Jiaxin	5	4	3	7	+8	4	F
7	(China) Yu Xinlu	5	4	3	7	+12	4	F
9	(United Kingdom) Ruby Newlands	5	5	1	6	+3	4	F
9	(United Kingdom) Ellie Patrick	5	5	1	6	+6	4	F
9	(China) Zhang Biyang	5	5	1	6	+9	0	F

GP = Games played; G = Goals; A = Assists; Pts = Points; +/− = Plus/minus; PIM = Penalties in minutes; POS = Position
Source: IIHF

==== Leading goaltenders ====
Only the top five goaltenders, based on save percentage, who have played at least 40% of their team's minutes, are included in this list.

Rank	Player	TOI	GA	GAA	SA	Sv%	SO
1	(China) Peng Yiyi	240:00	2	0.50	42	95.24	3
2	(United Kingdom) Evelyn Brown	260:00	7	1.62	60	88.33	2
3	(Latvia) Nikola Seleviča	302:28	12	2.38	98	87.76	1
4	(Kazakhstan) Veronika Ageyeva	252:47	16	3.80	119	86.55	1
5	(Netherlands) Robyn Verkaik	265:00	29	6.57	170	82.94	0

TOI = Time on ice (minutes:seconds); SA = Shots against; GA = Goals against; GAA = Goals against average; Sv% = Save percentage; SO = Shutouts
Source: IIHF

==== Awards ====
- Best players selected by the directorate:
  - Best Goaltender: (Latvia) Nikola Seleviča
  - Best Defender: (China) Chang Yuqi
  - Best Forward: (Netherlands) Emily Olsthoorn

Source: IIHF.com

== Group B tournament ==
2024 IIHF World Women's U18 Championship Division II B

Tournament details
- Host country: Bulgaria
- City: Sofia
- Venue: 1 (in 1 host city)
- Dates: 8–14 January 2024
- Teams: 6

Tournament statistics
- Games played: 15
- Goals scored: 130 (8.67 per game)
- Attendance: 1,863 (124 per game)
- Scoring leader: (New Zealand) Nerhys Gordon (12 points)

Official website
- www.iihf.com

The Division II Group B tournament was played in Sofia, Bulgaria, from 8 to 14 January 2024. New Zealand won, clinching promotion by scoring with their goalie pulled in their final game. South Africa replaced Estonia as the final entrant and lost all their games in their debut.

=== Participating teams ===
Team	Qualification
Mexico	6th place in 2023 World Championship Division II A and were relegated
Belgium	2nd place in 2023 World Championship Division II B
Iceland	3rd place in 2023 World Championship Division II B
New Zealand	4th place in 2023 World Championship Division II B
Bulgaria	Hosts; 5th place in 2023 World Championship Division II B
South Africa	First participation in World Championship

=== Standings ===
Pos	Team	Pld	W	OTW	OTL	L	GF	GA	GD	Pts	Promotion
1	New Zealand	5	4	0	0	1	33	9	+24	12 (Note: New Zealand defeated Iceland 2–0)	Promoted to the 2025 Division II A
2	Iceland	5	4	0	0	1	33	6	+27	12	
3	Belgium	5	3	1	0	1	23	5	+18	11	
4	Mexico	5	2	0	0	3	21	10	+11	6	
5	Bulgaria (H)	5	1	0	1	3	19	15	+4	4	
6	South Africa	5	0	0	0	5	1	85	−84	0	

Source: IIHF
Rules for classification: 1) points; 2) head-to-head points; 3) head-to-head goal difference; 4) head-to-head number of goals scored; 5) result against closest best-ranked team outside tied teams; 6) result against second-best ranked team outside tied teams; 7) seeding before tournament.
(H) Host

=== Results ===
All times are local (Eastern European Time – UTC+2).

8 January 2024; 13:00	Iceland	3–1 (0–0, 0–0, 3–1)	Mexico	Winter Sports Palace, Sofia

Game reference

8 January 2024; 20:00	Belgium	1–0 OT (0–0, 0–0, 0–0); OT: (1–0)	Bulgaria	Winter Sports Palace, Sofia

Game reference

9 January 2024; 13:00	Mexico	1–3 (0–2, 0–0, 1–1)	New Zealand	Winter Sports Palace, Sofia

Game reference

9 January 2024; 16:30	Belgium	0–1 (0–0, 0–1, 0–0)	Iceland	Winter Sports Palace, Sofia

Game reference

9 January 2024; 20:00	Bulgaria	13–1 (5–1, 3–0, 5–0)	South Africa	Winter Sports Palace, Sofia

Game reference

10 January 2024; 16:30	South Africa	0–22 (0–5, 0–5, 0–12)	New Zealand	Winter Sports Palace, Sofia

Game reference

11 January 2024; 13:00	Belgium	13–0 (3–0, 6–0, 4–0)	South Africa	Winter Sports Palace, Sofia

Game reference

11 January 2024; 16:30	Iceland	0–2 (0–1, 0–0, 0–1)	New Zealand	Winter Sports Palace, Sofia

Game reference

11 January 2024; 20:00	Mexico	4–0 (2–0, 0–0, 2–0)	Bulgaria	Winter Sports Palace, Sofia

Game reference

13 January 2024; 13:00	South Africa	0–13 (0–3, 0–7, 0–3)	Mexico	Winter Sports Palace, Sofia

Game reference

13 January 2024; 16:30	Bulgaria	3–5 (0–1, 1–1, 2–3)	Iceland	Winter Sports Palace, Sofia

Game reference

13 January 2024; 20:00	New Zealand	2–5 (1–3, 1–1, 0–1)	Belgium	Winter Sports Palace, Sofia

Game reference

14 January 2024; 13:00	Iceland	24–0 (10–0, 7–0, 7–0)	South Africa	Winter Sports Palace, Sofia

Game reference

14 January 2024; 16:30	New Zealand	4–3 (2–1, 0–1, 2–1)	Bulgaria	Winter Sports Palace, Sofia

Game reference

14 January 2024; 20:00	Mexico	2–4 (1–0, 0–2, 1–2)	Belgium	Winter Sports Palace, Sofia

Game reference

=== Awards and statistics ===
==== Scoring leaders ====
List shows the top skaters sorted by points, then goals.

Rank	Player	GP	G	A	Pts	+/−	PIM	POS
1	(New Zealand) Nerhys Gordon	5	9	3	12	+14	4	F
2	(New Zealand) Polly Bennetts	5	7	5	12	+12	0	F
3	(Belgium) Camille Sommerschuh	5	7	3	10	+10	2	F
4	(Iceland) Sólrún Arnarsdóttir	5	3	6	9	+6	4	F
5	(Mexico) Regina Labastida	5	8	0	8	+10	2	D
6	(Belgium) Louise Paulissen	5	3	5	8	+9	0	F
7	(Iceland) Friðrika Magnúsdóttir	5	4	3	7	+5	0	F
8	(Mexico) Rebecca Andrade Castro	5	3	4	7	+11	27	F
9	(New Zealand) Camryn Linton	5	2	5	7	+4	2	F
10	(Mexico) Daniela Cuena	5	5	1	6	0	2	F

GP = Games played; G = Goals; A = Assists; Pts = Points; +/− = Plus/minus; PIM = Penalties in minutes; POS = Position
Source: IIHF

==== Leading goaltenders ====
Only the top five goaltenders, based on save percentage, who have played at least 40% of their team's minutes, are included in this list.

Rank	Player	TOI	GA	GAA	SA	Sv%	SO
1	(Belgium) Anouk Belmans	243:55	5	1.23	98	94.90	1
2	(New Zealand) Zadia Paulse	239:44	9	2.25	119	92.44	1
3	(Bulgaria) Monika Nedyalkova	241:42	13	3.23	153	91.50	0
4	(Mexico) Nicole Duenas	263:22	8	1.82	77	89.61	1
5	(Iceland) Andrea Bachmann	258:14	6	1.39	53	88.68	1

TOI = Time on ice (minutes:seconds); SA = Shots against; GA = Goals against; GAA = Goals against average; Sv% = Save percentage; SO = Shutouts
Source: IIHF

==== Awards ====
- Best players selected by the directorate:
  - Best Goaltender: (Belgium) Anouk Belmans
  - Best Defender: (Iceland) Aðalheiður Ragnarsdóttir
  - Best Forward: (Bulgaria) Simona Asparuhova

Source: IIHF.com
