= 2023 IIHF U18 Women's World Championship Division II =

Women's ice hockey tournament

2023 IIHF World Women's U18 Championship Division II
Tournament details
- Host countries: United Kingdom; Bulgaria
- Venues: 2 (in 2 host cities)
- Dates: 21–27 January 2023; 26 January – 1 February 2023
- Teams: 12

The 2023 IIHF U18 Women's World Championship Division II was two international under-18 women's ice hockey tournaments organized by the International Ice Hockey Federation (IIHF). Divisions II A and II B represent the fourth and the fifth tier of competition at the 2023 IIHF U18 Women's World Championship.

== Group A tournament ==
2023 IIHF World Women's U18 Championship Division II A

Tournament details
- Host country: United Kingdom
- City: Dumfries
- Venue: 1 (in 1 host city)
- Dates: 21–27 January 2023
- Teams: 6

Official website
- www.iihf.com

The Division II Group A tournament was played in Dumfries, United Kingdom, from 21 to 27 January 2023.

=== Participating teams ===
Team	Qualification
Great Britain	Hosts; 2nd place in 2022 World Championship Division II
Australia	3rd place in 2022 World Championship Division II
Netherlands	4th place in 2022 World Championship Division II
Latvia	5th place in 2022 World Championship Division II
Turkey	6th place in 2022 World Championship Division II
Mexico	7th place in 2022 World Championship Division II

=== Final standings ===
Pos	Team	Pld	W	OTW	OTL	L	GF	GA	GD	Pts	Promotion or relegation
1	Australia	5	4	0	0	1	16	7	+9	12	Promoted to the 2024 Division I B
2	Latvia	5	2	2	0	1	14	7	+7	10 (Note: Latvia 4 Pts, Netherlands 4 Pts, Great Britain 1 Pt. Latvia defeated Netherlands 2–1 in overtime.)	
3	Netherlands	5	3	0	1	1	9	9	0	10	
4	Great Britain (H)	5	3	0	1	1	11	8	+3	10	
5	Turkey	5	0	1	0	4	6	11	−5	2	
6	Mexico	5	0	0	1	4	6	20	−14	1	Relegated to the 2024 Division II B

Source: IIHF
Rules for classification: 1) points; 2) head-to-head points; 3) head-to-head goal difference; 4) head-to-head number of goals scored; 5) result against closest best-ranked team outside tied teams; 6) result against second-best ranked team outside tied teams; 7) seeding before tournament.
(H) Host

=== Results ===
All times are local (UTC±0).

21 January 2023; 13:00	Australia	3–1 (0–1, 1–0, 2–0)	Turkey	Ice Bowl, Dumfries

Game reference

21 January 2023; 16:30	Mexico	1–6 (1–2, 0–2, 0–2)	Latvia	Ice Bowl, Dumfries

Game reference

21 January 2023; 20:00	Netherlands	3–1 (0–1, 0–0, 3–0)	Great Britain	Ice Bowl, Dumfries

Game reference

22 January 2023; 13:00	Turkey	3–2 GWS (0–0, 1–0, 1–2) (0–0, 1–0)	Mexico	Ice Bowl, Dumfries

Game reference

22 January 2023; 16:30	Australia	4–0 (3–0, 1–0, 0–0)	Netherlands	Ice Bowl, Dumfries

Game reference

22 January 2023; 20:00	Great Britain	2–3 GWS (0–0, 0–0, 2–2) (0–0, 0–1)	Latvia	Ice Bowl, Dumfries

Game reference

24 January 2023; 13:00	Netherlands	1–2 OT (0–0, 0–0, 1–1) (0–1)	Latvia	Ice Bowl, Dumfries

Game reference

24 January 2023; 16:30	Australia	5–2 (2–1, 1–1, 2–0)	Mexico	Ice Bowl, Dumfries

Game reference

24 January 2023; 20:00	Great Britain	3–1 (0–1, 3–0, 0–0)	Turkey	Ice Bowl, Dumfries

Game reference

26 January 2023; 13:00	Turkey	1–2 (0–0, 1–2, 0–0)	Netherlands	Ice Bowl, Dumfries

Game reference

26 January 2023; 16:30	Latvia	2–3 (0–1, 2–2, 0–0)	Australia	Ice Bowl, Dumfries

Game reference

26 January 2023; 20:00	Mexico	0–3 (0–0, 0–1, 0–2)	Great Britain	Ice Bowl, Dumfries

Game reference

27 January 2023; 13:00	Latvia	1–0 (1–0, 0–0, 0–0)	Turkey	Ice Bowl, Dumfries

Game reference

27 January 2023; 16:30	Netherlands	3–1 (1–0, 1–1, 1–0)	Mexico	Ice Bowl, Dumfries

Game reference

27 January 2023; 20:00	Great Britain	2–1 (0–1, 2–0, 0–0)	Australia	Ice Bowl, Dumfries

Game reference

== Group B tournament ==
2023 IIHF World Women's U18 Championship Division II B

Tournament details
- Host country: Bulgaria
- City: Sofia
- Venue: 1 (in 1 host city)
- Dates: 26 January – 1 February 2023
- Teams: 6

Official website
- www.iihf.com

The Division II Group B tournament was played in Sofia, Bulgaria, from 26 January to 1 February 2023.

=== Participating teams ===
Team	Qualification
Kazakhstan	8th place in 2022 World Championship Division II and were relegated
Iceland	9th place in 2022 World Championship Division II and were relegated
New Zealand	Didn't participate in 2022
Belgium	First participation in World Championship
Bulgaria	Hosts; First participation in World Championship
Estonia	First participation in World Championship

=== Final standings ===
Pos	Team	Pld	W	OTW	OTL	L	GF	GA	GD	Pts	Promotion
1	Kazakhstan	5	5	0	0	0	35	5	+30	15	Promoted to the 2024 Division II A
2	Belgium	5	3	1	0	1	22	13	+9	11	
3	Iceland	5	2	1	1	1	15	14	+1	9	
4	New Zealand	5	2	0	0	3	19	14	+5	6	
5	Bulgaria (H)	5	1	0	1	3	15	21	−6	4	
6	Estonia	5	0	0	0	5	1	40	−39	0	

Source: IIHF
Rules for classification: 1) points; 2) head-to-head points; 3) head-to-head goal difference; 4) head-to-head number of goals scored; 5) result against closest best-ranked team outside tied teams; 6) result against second-best ranked team outside tied teams; 7) seeding before tournament.
(H) Host

=== Results ===
All times are local (UTC+2).

26 January 2023; 16:30	Iceland	2–3 OT (0–1, 2–1, 0–0) (0–1)	Belgium	Winter Sports Palace, Sofia

Game reference

26 January 2023; 20:00	Estonia	0–6 (0–4, 0–2, 0–0)	Bulgaria	Winter Sports Palace, Sofia

Game reference

27 January 2023; 13:00	Iceland	2–1 (1–0, 1–0, 0–1)	New Zealand	Winter Sports Palace, Sofia

Game reference

27 January 2023; 16:30	Belgium	7–0 (0–0, 6–0, 1–0)	Estonia	Winter Sports Palace, Sofia

Game reference

27 January 2023; 20:00	Kazakhstan	8–1 (5–0, 2–1, 1–0)	Bulgaria	Winter Sports Palace, Sofia

Game reference

28 January 2023; 16:30	New Zealand	1–7 (0–2, 0–2, 1–3)	Kazakhstan	Winter Sports Palace, Sofia

Game reference

29 January 2023; 13:00	Iceland	8–1 (1–0, 3–0, 4–1)	Estonia	Winter Sports Palace, Sofia

Game reference

29 January 2023; 16:30	Kazakhstan	5–3 (2–1, 0–2, 3–0)	Belgium	Winter Sports Palace, Sofia

Game reference

29 January 2023; 20:00	New Zealand	4–2 (2–1, 0–1, 2–0)	Bulgaria	Winter Sports Palace, Sofia

Game reference

31 January 2023; 13:00	Estonia	0–8 (0–3, 0–4, 0–1)	Kazakhstan	Winter Sports Palace, Sofia

Game reference

31 January 2023; 16:30	Belgium	3–2 (1–1, 2–1, 0–0)	New Zealand	Winter Sports Palace, Sofia

Game reference

31 January 2023; 20:00	Bulgaria	2–3 GWS (0–1, 1–1, 1–0) (0–0, 0–1)	Iceland	Winter Sports Palace, Sofia

Game reference

1 February 2023; 13:00	New Zealand	11–0 (3–0, 1–0, 7–0)	Estonia	Winter Sports Palace, Sofia

Game reference

1 February 2023; 16:30	Bulgaria	4–6 (1–1, 2–4, 1–1)	Belgium	Winter Sports Palace, Sofia

Game reference

1 February 2023; 20:00	Kazakhstan	7–0 (2–0, 4–0, 1–0)	Iceland	Winter Sports Palace, Sofia

Game reference
