= 2020 IIHF U18 Women's World Championship Division II =

Women's ice hockey tournament

2020 IIHF World Women's U18 Championship Division II
Tournament details
- Host countries: Netherlands; Mexico
- Venues: 2 (in 2 host cities)
- Dates: 25–28 January 2020; 28 January – 2 February 2020
- Teams: 8

The 2020 IIHF U18 Women's World Championship Division II was two international under-18 women's ice hockey tournaments organized by the International Ice Hockey Federation (IIHF). Divisions II A and II B represent the fourth and the fifth tier of competition at the 2020 IIHF World Women's U18 Championship.

== Group A tournament ==
2020 IIHF World Women's U18 Championship Division II A

Tournament details
- Host country: Netherlands
- City: Eindhoven
- Venue: 1 (in 1 host city)
- Dates: 25–28 January 2020
- Teams: 4

Official website
- www.iihf.com

The Division II Group A tournament was played in Eindhoven, Netherlands, from 25 to 28 January 2020.

=== Participating teams ===
Team	Qualification
Netherlands	Hosts; 6th place in 2019 World Championship Division I B and were relegated
Kazakhstan	2nd place in 2019 World Championship Division I B Qualification
Chinese Taipei	3rd place in 2019 World Championship Division I B Qualification
Australia	4th place in 2019 World Championship Division I B Qualification

=== Final standings ===
Pos	Team	Pld	W	OTW	OTL	L	GF	GA	GD	Pts	Promotion
1	Chinese Taipei	3	2	1	0	0	10	7	+3	8	Promoted to the 2022 Division I B
2	Netherlands (H)	3	2	0	0	1	7	3	+4	6	
3	Australia	3	0	1	0	2	6	8	−2	2 (Note: Kazakhstan 2–3 (OT) Australia)	
4	Kazakhstan	3	0	0	2	1	6	11	−5	2	

Source: IIHF
Rules for classification: 1) points; 2) head-to-head points; 3) head-to-head goal difference; 4) head-to-head number of goals scored; 5) result against closest best-ranked team outside tied teams; 6) result against second-best ranked team outside tied teams; 7) seeding before tournament.
(H) Host

=== Results ===
25 January 2020; 16:30	Chinese Taipei	2–1 (0–1, 0–0, 2–0)	Netherlands	Ice Sport Centre, Eindhoven

Game reference

25 January 2020; 20:00	Kazakhstan	2–3 OT (0–0, 1–1, 1–1) (0–1)	Australia	Ice Sport Centre, Eindhoven

Game reference

26 January 2020; 16:30	Netherlands	2–0 (2–0, 0–0, 0–0)	Australia	Ice Sport Centre, Eindhoven

Game reference

26 January 2020; 20:00	Kazakhstan	3–4 OT (1–1, 1–1, 1–1) (0–1)	Chinese Taipei	Ice Sport Centre, Eindhoven

Game reference

28 January 2020; 15:30	Australia	3–4 (1–1, 1–1, 1–2)	Chinese Taipei	Ice Sport Centre, Eindhoven

Game reference

28 January 2020; 19:00	Netherlands	4–1 (0–0, 3–0, 1–1)	Kazakhstan	Ice Sport Centre, Eindhoven

Game reference

== Group B tournament ==
2020 IIHF World Women's U18 Championship Division II B

Tournament details
- Host country: Mexico
- City: Mexico City
- Venue: 1 (in 1 host city)
- Dates: 28 January – 2 February 2020
- Teams: 4

Official website
- www.iihf.com

The Division II Group B tournament was played in Mexico City, Mexico, from 28 January to 2 February 2020.

=== Participating teams ===
Team	Qualification
Spain	5th place in 2019 World Championship Division I B Qualification
Turkey	6th place in 2019 World Championship Division I B Qualification
Mexico	Hosts; 7th place in 2019 World Championship Division I B Qualification
New Zealand	First participation in World Championship

=== Preliminary round ===
==== Standings ====
Pos	Team	Pld	W	OTW	OTL	L	GF	GA	GD	Pts	Qualification
1	Spain	3	3	0	0	0	18	3	+15	9	Semifinals
2	Turkey	3	2	0	0	1	5	11	−6	6	Semifinals
3	Mexico (H)	3	1	0	0	2	4	6	−2	3	Semifinals
4	New Zealand	3	0	0	0	3	4	11	−7	0	Semifinals

Source: IIHF
Rules for classification: 1) points; 2) head-to-head points; 3) head-to-head goal difference; 4) head-to-head number of goals scored; 5) result against closest best-ranked team outside tied teams; 6) result against second-best ranked team outside tied teams; 7) seeding before tournament.
(H) Host

==== Results ====
28 January 2020; 16:00	Turkey	3–2 (1–0, 2–0, 0–2)	New Zealand	Santa Fe Ice Rink, Mexico City

Game reference

28 January 2020; 20:00	Mexico	2–3 (0–0, 0–0, 2–3)	Spain	Santa Fe Ice Rink, Mexico City

Game reference

29 January 2020; 16:00	Spain	6–1 (1–0, 2–0, 3–1)	New Zealand	Santa Fe Ice Rink, Mexico City

Game reference

29 January 2020; 19:30	Turkey	2–0 (0–0, 1–0, 1–0)	Mexico	Santa Fe Ice Rink, Mexico City

Game reference

30 January 2020; 16:00	Spain	9–0 (3–0, 4–0, 2–0)	Turkey	Santa Fe Ice Rink, Mexico City

Game reference

30 January 2020; 19:30	New Zealand	1–2 (0–1, 1–1, 0–0)	Mexico	Santa Fe Ice Rink, Mexico City

Game reference

=== Playoffs ===
Semifinals
1 February
Spain (OT)	2
New Zealand	1
1 February
Turkey	4
Mexico	2

Final
2 February
Spain	7
Turkey	0
Third place match
2 February
New Zealand	3
Mexico	6

==== Semifinals ====
1 February 2020; 16:00	Spain	2–1 OT (0–0, 1–0, 0–1) (1–0)	New Zealand	Santa Fe Ice Rink, Mexico City

Game reference

1 February 2020; 19:30	Turkey	4–2 (1–0, 1–1, 2–1)	Mexico	Santa Fe Ice Rink, Mexico City

Game reference

==== Third place match ====
2 February 2020; 16:00	New Zealand	3–6 (1–4, 1–0, 1–2)	Mexico	Santa Fe Ice Rink, Mexico City

Game reference

==== Final ====
2 February 2020; 19:30	Spain	7–0 (3–0, 1–0, 3–0)	Turkey	Santa Fe Ice Rink, Mexico City

Game reference
