= 2022 IIHF U18 Women's World Championship Division II =

Women's ice hockey tournament

2022 IIHF World Women's U18 Championship Division II

Tournament details
- Host country: Turkey
- Venues: 2 (in 1 host city)
- Dates: 27 June 2022 – 5 July 2022
- Teams: 9

Official website
- www.iihf.com

The 2022 IIHF U18 Women's World Championship Division II was an international under-18 women's ice hockey tournament organized by the International Ice Hockey Federation (IIHF). The tournament represented the fourth tier of competition at the 2022 IIHF World Women's U18 Championship. The tournament was played on the two ice rinks at the Zeytinburnu Buz Adası (called 'Arena Park' in IIHF documents) in the Zeytinburnu district of Istanbul, Turkey. Originally scheduled to be held from 21 to 27 January 2022, it was rescheduled due to the COVID-19 pandemic and was played from 27 June to 5 July 2022.

Spain women's national under-18 ice hockey team won the tournament and were promoted to the 2023 Division I Group B. With increased registration for 2023, Division II was expanded into two tournaments, meaning that Kazakhstan and Iceland, the respective eighth and ninth place teams in 2022, were effectively relegated to the 2023 Division II Group B.

== Participating teams ==
Team	Qualification
Great Britain	6th place in 2020 World Championship Division I B and were relegated
Netherlands	2nd place in 2020 World Championship Division II A
Australia	3rd place in 2020 World Championship Division II A
Kazakhstan	4th place in 2020 World Championship Division II A
Spain	1st place in 2020 World Championship Division II B
Turkey	Hosts; 2nd place in 2020 World Championship Division II B
Mexico	3rd place in 2020 World Championship Division II B
Iceland	First participation in World Championship
Latvia	First participation in World Championship

== First round ==
In the first round, the teams were drawn into three groups of three. All teams advance to the second round; they will be allocated to the second round groups according to the first round rankings.

=== Group A ===
Pos	Team	Pld	W	OTW	OTL	L	GF	GA	GD	Pts	Qualification
1	Great Britain	2	2	0	0	0	12	0	+12	6	Group D
2	Turkey (H)	2	0	1	0	1	2	7	−5	2	Group E
3	Mexico	2	0	0	1	1	1	8	−7	1	Group F

Source: IIHF
Rules for classification: 1) points; 2) head-to-head points; 3) head-to-head goal difference; 4) head-to-head number of goals scored; 5) seeding before tournament.
(H) Host

27 June 2022; 20:00	Mexico	0–6 (0–1, 0–3, 0–2)	Great Britain	Arena Park 1, Istanbul

Game reference

28 June 2022; 20:00	Turkey	2–1 GWS (0–0, 1–1, 0–0) (0–0, 1–0)	Mexico	Arena Park 1, Istanbul

Game reference

29 June 2022; 20:00	Great Britain	6–0 (2–0, 3–0, 1–0)	Turkey	Arena Park 1, Istanbul

Game reference

=== Group B ===
Pos	Team	Pld	W	OTW	OTL	L	GF	GA	GD	Pts	Qualification
1	Netherlands	2	2	0	0	0	11	2	+9	6	Group D
2	Latvia	2	1	0	0	1	7	6	+1	3	Group E
3	Kazakhstan	2	0	0	0	2	1	11	−10	0	Group F

Source: IIHF
Rules for classification: 1) points; 2) head-to-head points; 3) head-to-head goal difference; 4) head-to-head number of goals scored; 5) seeding before tournament.

27 June 2022; 16:30	Latvia	2–5 (1–2, 1–2, 0–1)	Netherlands	Arena Park 2, Istanbul

Game reference

28 June 2022; 16:30	Kazakhstan	1–5 (0–3, 1–2, 0–0)	Latvia	Arena Park 2, Istanbul

Game reference

29 June 2022; 16:30	Netherlands	6–0 (3–0, 0–0, 3–0)	Kazakhstan	Arena Park 2, Istanbul

Game reference

=== Group C ===
Pos	Team	Pld	W	OTW	OTL	L	GF	GA	GD	Pts	Qualification
1	Spain	2	2	0	0	0	15	1	+14	6	Group D
2	Australia	2	1	0	0	1	6	5	+1	3	Group E
3	Iceland	2	0	0	0	2	1	16	−15	0	Group F

Source: IIHF
Rules for classification: 1) points; 2) head-to-head points; 3) head-to-head goal difference; 4) head-to-head number of goals scored; 5) seeding before tournament.

27 June 2022; 13:00	Iceland	1–5 (0–1, 0–1, 1–3)	Australia	Arena Park 1, Istanbul

Game reference

28 June 2022; 13:00	Spain	11–0 (4–0, 7–0, 0–0)	Iceland	Arena Park 1, Istanbul

Game reference

29 June 2022; 13:00	Australia	1–4 (0–2, 0–0, 1–2)	Spain	Arena Park 1, Istanbul

Game reference

== Second round ==
In the second round, the teams play in three groups of three. All teams, except the third team from Group F, advance to the final round.

=== Group D ===
Pos	Team	Pld	W	OTW	OTL	L	GF	GA	GD	Pts	Qualification
1	Spain	2	2	0	0	0	8	0	+8	6	Final
2	Great Britain	2	0	1	0	1	2	5	−3	2	Final
3	Netherlands	2	0	0	1	1	1	6	−5	1	3rd place match

Source: IIHF
Rules for classification: 1) points; 2) head-to-head points; 3) head-to-head goal difference; 4) head-to-head number of goals scored; 5) seeding before tournament.

1 July 2022; 20:00	Spain	4–0 (2–0, 1–0, 1–0)	Great Britain	Arena Park 1, Istanbul

Game reference

2 July 2022; 20:00	Spain	4–0 (0–0, 0–0, 4–0)	Netherlands	Arena Park 1, Istanbul

Game reference

3 July 2022; 20:00	Great Britain	2–1 OT (0–0, 1–1, 0–0) (1–0)	Netherlands	Arena Park 1, Istanbul

Game reference

=== Group E ===
Pos	Team	Pld	W	OTW	OTL	L	GF	GA	GD	Pts	Qualification
1	Australia	2	2	0	0	0	7	1	+6	6	3rd place match
2	Latvia	2	1	0	0	1	6	3	+3	3	5th place match
3	Turkey (H)	2	0	0	0	2	1	10	−9	0	5th place match

Source: IIHF
Rules for classification: 1) points; 2) head-to-head points; 3) head-to-head goal difference; 4) head-to-head number of goals scored; 5) seeding before tournament.
(H) Host

1 July 2022; 16:30	Australia	5–0 (2–0, 1–0, 2–0)	Turkey	Arena Park 2, Istanbul

Game reference

2 July 2022; 16:30	Latvia	1–2 (1–1, 0–0, 0–1)	Australia	Arena Park 2, Istanbul

Game reference

3 July 2022; 16:30	Latvia	5–1 (2–0, 1–1, 2–0)	Turkey	Arena Park 2, Istanbul

Game reference

=== Group F ===
Pos	Team	Pld	W	OTW	OTL	L	GF	GA	GD	Pts	Qualification
1	Mexico	2	2	0	0	0	11	3	+8	6	7th place match
2	Kazakhstan	2	1	0	0	1	3	6	−3	3	7th place match
3	Iceland	2	0	0	0	2	2	7	−5	0	

Source: IIHF
Rules for classification: 1) points; 2) head-to-head points; 3) head-to-head goal difference; 4) head-to-head number of goals scored; 5) seeding before tournament.

1 July 2022; 13:00	Mexico	5–2 (2–0, 1–2, 2–0)	Iceland	Arena Park 1, Istanbul

Game reference

2 July 2022; 13:00	Kazakhstan	2–0 (0–0, 1–0, 1–0)	Iceland	Arena Park 1, Istanbul

Game reference

3 July 2022; 13:00	Mexico	6–1 (2–1, 2–0, 2–0)	Kazakhstan	Arena Park 1, Istanbul

Game reference

== Final round ==
=== 7th place match ===
5 July 2022; 9:30	Mexico	2–0 (0–0, 0–0, 2–0)	Kazakhstan	Arena Park 2, Istanbul

Game reference

=== 5th place match ===
5 July 2022; 13:00	Latvia	5–1 (2–0, 1–0, 2–1)	Turkey	Arena Park 2, Istanbul

Game reference

=== 3rd place match ===
5 July 2022; 16:00	Netherlands	1–2 (1–1, 0–0, 0–1)	Australia	Arena Park 1, Istanbul

Game reference

=== Final ===
5 July 2022; 20:30	Spain	3–1 (3–0, 0–1, 0–0)	Great Britain	Arena Park 1, Istanbul

Game reference
