= South African Ice Hockey Federation =

South Africa
- Association name: South African Ice Hockey Federation
- IIHF Code: RSA
- IIHF membership: 25 February 1937
- President: Jason Cerff
- IIHF men's ranking: 41st
- IIHF women's ranking: 33rd

The South African Ice Hockey Federation (SAIHF) (Afrikaans: Suid-Afrikaanse Yshokkie Federasie) is the governing body that oversees ice hockey in South Africa. It was the first African nation to join the International Ice Hockey Federation.

== National teams ==
- Men's
- Women's
- Under 20
- Under 18
- Women's Under 18

== 2025 South Africa Participation ==
| Event | Division | Host nation | Host city | Date | Result |
|---|---|---|---|---|---|
| Men's | DIV IIIA | Turkey | Istanbul | 21 – 27 April 2025 | |
| Women's | DIV IIIA | Serbia | | 2 – 8 March 2025 | |
| Men U20 | DIV IIIB | Thailand | Bangkok | 10 – 16 December 2024 | |
| Men U18 | DIV IIIB | Thailand | Bangkok | 28 Feb – 6 March 2025 | |
| Women's U18 | DIV IIB | Turkey | Istanbul | 18 – 24 January 2025 | |

== 2024 South Africa Participation ==
| Event | Division | Host nation | Host city | Date | Result |
|---|---|---|---|---|---|
| Men's | DIV IIIA | Kyrgyzstan | Bishkek | 10 – 16 March 2024 | 5th Place |
| Women's | DIV IIB | Turkey | Istanbul | 1 – 7 April 2024 | 6th Place (Relegation to DIV IIIA) |
| Men U20 | DIV IIIB | Bosnia and Herzegovina | Sarajevo | 25 - 30 January 2024 | Bronze Medal |
| Men U18 | DIV IIIB | South Africa | Cape Town | 4 – 7 March 2024 | 4th Place |
| Women's U18 | DIV IIB | Bulgaria | Sofia | 8 – 14 January 2024 | 6th Place |

== 2023 South Africa Participation ==
| Event | Division | Host nation | Host city | Date | Result |
|---|---|---|---|---|---|
| Men's | DIV IIIA | South Africa | Cape Town | 17 – 23 April 2023 | Bronze Medal |
| Women's | DIV IIB | South Africa | Cape Town | 20 –26 February 2023 | 4th Place |
| Men U20 | DIV III | Turkey | Istanbul | 26 January 2022 – 2 February 2023 | 8th Place |
| Men U18 | DIV IIIB | South Africa | Cape Town | 13 – 16 March 2023 | 4th Place |

== 2022 South Africa Participation ==
| Event | Division | Host nation | Host city | Date | Result |
|---|---|---|---|---|---|
| Men's | DIV IIIB | South Africa | Cape Town | 13–18 March 2022 | Gold Medal (Promoted to 2023 Division IIIA) |
| Men U20 | DIV III | Mexico | Queretaro | 22–30 July 2022 | 8th Place |
| Men U18 | DIV IIIB | Bosnia and Herzegovina | Sarajevo | 17–22 April 2022 | Bronze Medal |
| Women's | DIV III | Croatia | Zagreb | 17–22 May 2022 | 4th Place |

== 2021 South Africa Participation ==
| Event | Division | Host nation | Host city | Date | Result |
|---|---|---|---|---|---|
| Men's | DIV IIIB | South Africa | Cape Town | | Cancelled |
| Men U20 | DIV III | Mexico | Mexico City | | Cancelled |
| Men U18 | DIV IIIB | Luxembourg | Kockelscheuer | | Cancelled |
| Women's | DIV III | Croatia | Zagreb | | Cancelled |

== 2020 South Africa Participation ==
| Event | Division | Host nation | Host city | Date | Result |
|---|---|---|---|---|---|
| Men's | DIV IIIB | South Africa | Cape Town | 20–26 April 2020 | Cancelled |
| Men U20 | DIV III | Bulgaria | Sofia | 13–19 January 2020 | 8th Place |
| Men U18 | DIV IIIB | Luxembourg | Kockelscheuer | 29 March - 4 April 2020 | Cancelled |
| Women's | DIV III | Bulgaria | Sofia | 4–10 December 2019 | Gold Medal |

== 2019 South Africa Participation ==
| Event | Division | Host nation | Host city | Date | Result |
|---|---|---|---|---|---|
| Men's | DIV III | Bulgaria | Sofia | 22–28 April 2019 | 6th Place (Relegation to 2020 Division III Group B) |
| Men U20 | DIV III | Iceland | Reykjavík | 14–20 January 2019 | 7th Place |
| Men U18 | DIV IIIB | South Africa | Cape Town | 9–12 April 2019 | Bronze Medal |
| Women's | DIV IIBQ | South Africa | Cape Town | 13–18 January 2019 | 3rd Place |

== 2018 South Africa Participation ==
| Event | Division | Host nation | Host city | Date | Result |
|---|---|---|---|---|---|
| Men's | DIV III | South Africa | Cape Town | 16 – 22 April 2017 | 5th Place |
| Men U20 | DIV IIIQ | South Africa | Cape Town | 26 – 28 January 2018 | 1st Place (Promoted to the 2019 U20 World Championship Division III) |
| Men U18 | DIV IIIB | New Zealand | Queenstown | 26 – 28 April 2018 | Bronze Medal |
| Women's | DIV IIBQ | Bulgaria | Sofia | 4 – 9 December 2017 | 3rd Place |

== 2017 South Africa results ==
| Event | Division | Host nation | Date | Result |
|---|---|---|---|---|
| Men's | Div. III | Bulgaria | 10–16 April 2017 | 5th Place |
| Men U20 | Div. III | New Zealand | 16–22 January 2017 | 8th Place |
| Men U18 | Div IIIB | Mexico | 18–20 March 2017 | Bronze Medal |
| Women's | Div IIIBQ | Chinese Taipei | 12–17 December 2016 | 3rd Place |

== Provincial associations ==
- Western Province Ice Hockey Association (WPIHA)
- Gauteng Ice Hockey Association (GIHA)
- Kwa-zulu Natal Ice Hockey Association (KZNIHA)
- Eastern Province Ice Hockey Association (EPIHA)

== Leagues ==
- Cape Town Premier League
- Cape Town U/20 League
- Cape Town PeeWee League
- Gauteng Premier League
- Gauteng First Division
- Gauteng Premier U20 League
- Gauteng U18 League
- Gauteng U16 League
- Gauteng U14 League
- Ladies League

== National competitions ==
- South African Super League
- South African Junior Interprovincial Ice Hockey Championship
- South African Ladies Interprovivial Ice Hockey Championships

== See also ==
- Ice hockey in Africa
