= Western Province Ice Hockey Association =

Western Ice Hockey Association
- Sport: Ice Hockey
- Jurisdiction: Western Cape, South Africa
- Abbreviation: WPIHA
- Headquarters: The Ice Station, GrandWest Casino
- Location: Cape Town
- President: Jason Cerff
- Vice president(s): Salama Khan
- Secretary: Tracy Cerff
- Coach: Marc Giot

Official website
- www.wpicehockey.co.za
- (South Africa)

The Western Province Ice Hockey Association (WPIHA, WP Ice Hockey) is a non-profit organization and member branch of South African Ice Hockey Federation in charge of governing ice hockey at all levels in Western Cape. It comprises 3 ice hockey teams, 110 players, 10 officials.

== Executive committee ==
- Jason Cerff - President
- Salama Khan - Vice President
- Tracy Cerff - General Secretary
- Louise Murry - Treasurer
- Sharief Kamish - Player Development
- Gail Sauer - Women in Sport
- Marc Giot - Head Coach
- Jonathan Burger - Referee-in-Chief

== Leagues ==
- Western Province Ice Hockey U12 League - Under 12's
- Western Province Ice Hockey U16 League - Under 16's
- Western Province Ice Hockey U20 League - Under 20's
- Western Province Ice Hockey Premier League - Senior
- Western Province Ice Hockey Masters League - Masters

== Teams ==
- Cape Town Kings (Men's Super League)
- Cape Town Queens (Woman's Super League)
- Cape Town Penguins
- Cape Town Storm
- Cape Town Griffins (Ladies Team)
- Team Grey (Masters)
- Team Black (Masters)
