= Latvia women's national under-18 ice hockey team =

Latvia
- Association: Latvijas Hokeja Federācija
- Head coach: (Latvia) Miks Golubovičs
- Assistants: (Latvia) Laila Dekmeijere-Trigubova (Latvia) Vladislavs Koniševs
- Captain: Madara Saulīte
- Top scorer: Linda Rulle (18)
- Most points: Linda Rulle (23)
- Team colors
- IIHF code: LAT
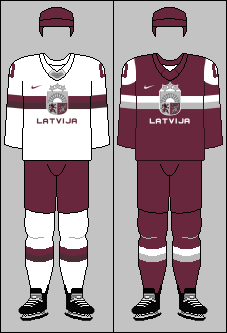

First international
- Netherlands 5–2 Latvia (Istanbul, Turkey; 27 June 2022)

Biggest win
- Latvia 14–2 Chinese Taipei (Riga, Latvia; 21 January 2025)

Biggest defeat
- Kazakhstan 9–1 Latvia (Istanbul, Turkey; 20 January 2026)

IIHF World Women's U18 Championships
- Appearances: 4 (first in 2022)
- Best result: 2nd – Div. II Gr. A (22nd overall, 2023)

International record (W–L–T)
- 12–8–0

The Latvian women's national under-18 ice hockey team is the women's national under-18 ice hockey team of Latvia. The team is controlled by the Latvian Ice Hockey Federation (Latvian: Latvijas Hokeja Federācija), a member of the International Ice Hockey Federation. The team was initially scheduled to debut at the 2021 IIHF World Women's U18 Championship; however, due to the cancellation of the event, it instead made its debut in 2022, where it finished fifth in Division II. Their best finish to date was in 2023, where they took second place in Division II – Group A, one place short of promotion to Division I.

== International competitions ==
=== World Women's U18 Championship ===
Year	GP	W	L	GF	GA	Pts	Rank
2022	5	3	2	18	8	6	24th place
2023	5	4^	1	14	7	10	22nd place
2024	5	2	3*	10	13	7	24th place
2025	5	3	2	33	12	9	23rd place

^Includes two overtime/shootout wins
*Includes one loss in a shootout
