= Belgium women's national under-18 ice hockey team =

Belgium
- Nickname: Belgian Blades
- Association: Royal Belgian Ice Hockey Federation
- Head coach: (Belgium) Tim Vos
- Assistants: (Belgium) Femke Bosmans
- Captain: Louise Paulissen
- Most points: Camille Sommerschuh (17)
- Team colors
- IIHF code: BEL

First international
- Belgium 3–2 Iceland (Sofia, Bulgaria; 26 January 2023)

Biggest win
- Belgium 13–0 South Africa (Sofia, Bulgaria; 11 January 2024); Belgium 13–0 South Africa (Cape Town, South Africa; 30 January 2026)

Biggest defeat
- Iceland 7–0 Belgium (Istanbul, Turkey; 20 January 2025)

IIHF World Women's U18 Championships
- Appearances: 2 (first in 2023)
- Best result: 2nd – Div. II Gr. B (28th overall, 2023)

International record (W–L–T)
- 9–2–0

The Belgian women's national under-18 ice hockey team is the women's national under-18 ice hockey team of Belgium. The team is controlled by the Royal Belgian Ice Hockey Federation, a member of the International Ice Hockey Federation. The team made its debut at the 2023 IIHF World Women's U18 Championship, where it finished second in Division II – Group B.

== International competitions ==
=== World Women's U18 Championship ===
Year	GP	W	L	GF	GA	Pts	Rank
2023	5	4^	1	22	13	11	28th place
2024	5	4^	1	23	5	11	29th place

^Includes one win in extra time
