= Krzysztof Bujar =

Polish ice hockey player (1961–2023)

- Born: 14 November 1961 Katowice, Poland
- Died: 18 September 2023 (aged 61)
- Height: 5 ft 7 in (170 cm)
- Weight: 170 lb (77 kg; 12 st 2 lb)
- Position: Right wing
- Played for: Naprzód Janów
- National team: Poland
- Playing career: 1980–1994

Krzysztof Andrzej Bujar (14 November 1961 – 18 September 2023) was a Polish ice hockey player. He played for Naprzód Janów during his career. He also played for the Polish national team at the 1992 Winter Olympics and the 1989 World Championship.

Bujar died on 18 September 2023, at the age of 61.
