= Sepp Reif =

German ice hockey player (1937–2023)

Personal information
- Nationality: German
- Born: 5 September 1937; Munich, Germany
- Died: 2 March 2023 (aged 85); Pulheim, Germany

Sport
- Sport: Ice hockey

Sepp Reif (5 September 1937 – 2 March 2023) was a German ice hockey player. He competed in the men's tournaments at the 1960 Winter Olympics, the 1964 Winter Olympics and the 1968 Winter Olympics.

Reif died in Pulheim on 2 March 2023, at the age of 85.
