= Bulgaria women's national under-18 ice hockey team =

Bulgaria Женски национален отбор по хокей на лед на България до 18 години (Bulgarian)
- Association: Bulgarian Ice Hockey Federation
- Head coach: Stefani Stoyanova
- Assistants: Maria Runevska
- Captain: Maya Georgieva
- Team colors
- IIHF code: BUL

First international
- Bulgaria 6–0 Estonia (Sofia, Bulgaria; 26 January 2023)

Biggest win
- Bulgaria 13–1 South Africa (Sofia, Bulgaria; 9 January 2024)

Biggest defeat
- Kazakhstan 8–1 Bulgaria (Sofia, Bulgaria; 27 January 2023)

IIHF World Women's U18 Championships
- Appearances: 2 (first in 2023)
- Best result: 5th – Div. II Gr. B (30th overall, 2023)

International record (W–L–T)
- 2–8–0

The Bulgaria women's national under-18 ice hockey team (Bulgarian: Женски национален отбор по хокей на лед на България до 18 години, romanized: Zhenski natsionalen otbor po khokeĭ na led na Bŭlgariya do 18 godini) is the women's national Under-18 ice hockey team of Bulgaria. The team is controlled by the Bulgarian Ice Hockey Federation, a member of the International Ice Hockey Federation.

== International competitions ==
=== World Women's U18 Championship ===
Year	GP	W	L	GF	GA	Pts	Rank
2023	5	1	4*	15	21	4	30th place
2024	5	1	4*	19	15	4	31st place

*Includes one loss in extra time (in the round robin)
