= Bulgarian Ice Hockey Federation =

Ice hockey governing body of Bulgaria

Bulgaria
- Association name: Bulgarian Ice Hockey Federation
- IIHF Code: BUL
- IIHF membership: July 25, 1960
- President: Martin Milanov
- IIHF men's ranking: 31st
- IIHF women's ranking: 24th

The Bulgarian Ice Hockey Federation (Bulgarian: Българска федерация по хокей на лед) is the governing body of ice hockey in Bulgaria.

== National teams ==
- Bulgaria men's national ice hockey team
- Bulgaria men's national junior ice hockey team
- Bulgaria men's national under-18 ice hockey team
- Bulgaria women's national ice hockey team
