= Estonia women's national under-18 ice hockey team =

Estonia Eesti kuni 18-aastaste naiste jäähokikoondis (Estonian)
- Association: Estonian Ice Hockey Association
- Head coach: Oleksii Lubnin
- Most games: Several players (5)
- Top scorer: Amalia Geller (1)
- Most points: Amalia Geller (1)
- Team colors
- IIHF code: EST

First international
- Bulgaria 6–0 Estonia (Sofia, Bulgaria; 26 January 2023)

Biggest defeat
- New Zealand 11–0 Estonia (Sofia, Bulgaria; 1 February 2023)

IIHF World Women's U18 Championships
- Appearances: 1 (first in 2023)
- Best result: 6th – Div. II Gr. B (31st overall, 2023)

International record (W–L–T)
- 0–5–0

The Estonia women's national under-18 ice hockey team (Estonian: Eesti kuni 18-aastaste naiste jäähokikoondis) is the women's national Under-18 ice hockey team of Estonia. The team is controlled by the Estonian Ice Hockey Association, a member of the International Ice Hockey Federation.

== International competitions ==
=== World Women's U18 Championship ===
- 2023 IIHF World Women's U18 Championship. Finish: 6th in Division II Group B (31st overall)
