= 2023 IIHF U18 Women's World Championship =

Ice hockey championship

Tournament details
- Host country: Sweden
- Venue: 1 (in 1 host city)
- Dates: 8–15 January 2023
- Teams: 8

Final positions
- Champions: Canada (7th title)
- Runners-up: Sweden
- Third place: United States
- Fourth place: Finland

Tournament statistics
- Games played: 21
- Goals scored: 130 (6.19 per game)
- Attendance: 11,604 (553 per game)
- Scoring leader: (Slovakia) Nela Lopušanová (12 points)

Awards
- MVP: (Slovakia) Nela Lopušanová

The 2023 IIHF U18 Women's World Championship was the 15th IIHF U18 Women's World Championship in ice hockey which took place in Östersund, Sweden, 8–15 January 2023.

== Top Division ==
The Top Division tournament was played in Östersund, Sweden from 8 to 15 January 2023.

=== Match officials ===
Ten referees and ten linesmen were selected for the tournament.

Referees

- (Canada) Jennifer Berezowski
- (Czech Republic) Zuzana Svobodová
- (Germany) Vanessa Anselm
- (United Kingdom) Hollie Neenan
- (Japan) Anna Kuroda
- (Latvia) Sintija Čamane
- (Sweden) Ida Henriksson
- (Sweden) Veronica Lovensnö
- (United States) Taylor Hanvelt
- (United States) Jenna Janshen

Linesmen

- (China) Wang Hui
- (Czech Republic) Kristina Hájková
- (Germany) Caroline Butt
- (Germany) Leonie Ernst
- (France) Alexia Cheyroux
- (Netherlands) Britt Kösters
- (Poland) Natalia Witkowska
- (Switzerland) Anina Egli
- (United States) Melanie Gotsdiner
- (United States) Breana Kraut

=== Preliminary round ===
All times are local (UTC+1).

==== Group A ====
Pos	Team	Pld	W	OTW	OTL	L	GF	GA	GD	Pts	Qualification
1	Canada	3	3	0	0	0	15	3	+12	9	Semifinals
2	United States	3	2	0	0	1	15	7	+8	6	Semifinals
3	Sweden (H)	3	1	0	0	2	11	11	0	3	Quarterfinals
4	Finland	3	0	0	0	3	2	22	−20	0	Quarterfinals

Source: IIHF
Rules for classification: 1) points; 2) head-to-head points; 3) head-to-head goal difference; 4) head-to-head number of goals scored; 5) result against closest best-ranked team outside tied teams; 6) result against second-best ranked team outside tied teams; 7) seeding before tournament.
(H) Host

8 January 2023; 16:00	United States	6–3 (1–1, 2–1, 3–1)	Sweden	Östersund Arena A, Östersund; Attendance: 760

Game reference

Annelies Bergmann
Goalies
Ida Henriksson
Referees:
(Canada) Jennifer Berezowski
(United States) Jenna Janshen
Linesmen:
(Czech Republic) Krityna Hájková
(United States) Breana Kraut

Lindsay (Jordan, Scannell) (PP) – 06:28	1–0
	1–1	15:38 – Rehn (Hallbeck) (SH)
Taber (St. Martin, Healy) (PP) – 28:03	2–1
	2–2	34:47 – Hallin (Jungåker) (PP)
Compton (Lalonde) – 36:31	3–2
DiGirolamo (Avar, Lalonde) – 45:11	4–2
Scannell (Klepinger, Healy) (PP) – 50:33	5–2
	5–3	51:54 – Natt och Dag (Svensson, Hallin)
McCarthy (ENG) – 59:04	6–3

16 min
Penalties
12 min
43
Shots
32

8 January 2023; 20:00	Canada	8–0 (2–0, 3–0, 3–0)	Finland	Östersund Arena A, Östersund; Attendance: 338

Game reference

Arianne Leblanc
Goalies
Kerttu Kuja-Halkola
Referees:
(United States) Taylor Hanvelt
(Japan) Anna Kuroda
Linesmen:
(Germany) Caroline Butt
(United States) Melanie Gotsdiner

Kraemer (Pais) – 03:59	1–0
Kraemer (Law, Venusio) – 12:13	2–0
Lunney (Alexander) – 28:32	3–0
Hurry (Murphy, Kraemer) (EA) – 39:01	4–0
Grober (Law) – 39:34	5–0
Stonehouse (Law, Graham) – 44:00	6–0
Graham (Stonehouse) – 51:48	7–0
Caron (Grober, Baxter) (PP) – 56:26	8–0

8 min
Penalties
6 min
48
Shots
9

9 January 2023; 16:00	United States	8–1 (2–0, 3–1, 3–0)	Finland	Östersund Arena A, Östersund; Attendance: 182

Game reference

Layla Hemp
Goalies
Suvi Saarinen
Kerttu Kuja-Halkola
Referees:
(Latvia) Sintija Čamane
(Sweden) Veronica Lovensnö
Linesmen:
(France) Alexia Cheyroux
(Netherlands) Britt Kösters

Scannell – 02:56	1–0
Taber (Dunne, Kim) – 14:13	2–0
	2–1	23:02 – Pelkonen (Salonen)
Scannell – 24:11	3–1
Scannell – 24:48	4–1
Dunne (Scannell, Hall) (PP) – 30:58	5–1
Kim (St. Martin) (PP) – 46:56	6–1
Hall (Lindsay, Dunne) (PP) – 54:55	7–1
McCarthy (DiGirolamo, Scannell) – 58:19	8–1

8 min
Penalties
8 min
40
Shots
20

9 January 2023; 20:00	Sweden	2–4 (1–1, 1–1, 0–2)	Canada	Östersund Arena A, Östersund; Attendance: 972

Game reference

Felicia Frank
Goalies
Hannah Clark
Referees:
(Germany) Vanessa Anselm
(Sweden) Ida Henriksson
Linesmen:
(Switzerland) Anina Egli
(Germany) Leonie Ernst

Svensson – 02:50	1–0
	1–1	07:36 – Pais
	1–2	34:07 – Law (Venusio, Stonehouse) (PP)
Jungåker) (Raunio) (PP2) – 39:33	2–2
	2–3	44:58 – Kraemer (Aubin) (PP)
	2–4	59:45 – Kraemer (ENG)

12 min
Penalties
28 min
45
Shots
31

11 January 2023; 16:00	Finland	1–6 (0–1, 1–3, 0–2)	Sweden	Östersund Arena A, Östersund; Attendance: 1,125

Game reference

Kerttu Kuja-Halkola
Suvi Saarinen
Goalies
Felicia Frank
Referees:
(United States) Jenna Janshen
(Czech Republic) Zuzana Svobodová
Linesmen:
(China) Wang Hui
(Poland) Natalia Witkowska

	0–1	13:17 – Hellman (Rehn, Bergeby Hallbeck)
Vanhanen (Berg) – 26:32	1–1
	1–2	27:54 – Andersson (Utbult, Lindeberg)
	1–3	33:20 – Svensson (Lindqvist, Sohrner)
	1–4	39:21 – Jungåker (Ålenius)
	1–5	40:59 – Svensson (Markström, Lindeberg) (PP)
	1–6	43:11 – Lindqvist (Markström, Svensson)

6 min
Penalties
6 min
16
Shots
36

11 January 2023; 20:00	Canada	3–1 (0–0, 2–1, 1–0)	United States	Östersund Arena A, Östersund; Attendance: 337

Game reference

Hannah Clark
Goalies
Annelies Bergmann
Referees:
(Canada) Jennifer Berezowski
(United Kingdom) Hollie Neenan
Linesmen:
(United States) Melanie Gotsdiner
(Czech Republic) Kristina Hájková

	0–1	31:15 – Dunne
Kraemer (Pieckenhagen, Pais) – 32:43	1–1
Pais (Pieckenhagen, Lunney) – 34:57	2–1
Kraemer – 43:12	3–1

8 min
Penalties
10 min
35
Shots
11

==== Group B ====
Pos	Team	Pld	W	OTW	OTL	L	GF	GA	GD	Pts	Qualification
1	Czechia	3	3	0	0	0	12	6	+6	9	Quarterfinals
2	Slovakia	3	2	0	0	1	13	8	+5	6	Quarterfinals
3	Switzerland	3	1	0	0	2	5	8	−3	3	Relegation round
4	Japan	3	0	0	0	3	5	13	−8	0	Relegation round

Source: IIHF
Rules for classification: 1) points; 2) head-to-head points; 3) head-to-head goal difference; 4) head-to-head number of goals scored; 5) result against closest best-ranked team outside tied teams; 6) result against second-best ranked team outside tied teams; 7) seeding before tournament.

8 January 2023; 12:00	Czechia	3–2 (0–2, 0–0, 3–0)	Switzerland	Östersund Arena A, Östersund; Attendance: 179

Game reference

Michaela Hesová
Goalies
Talina Benderer
Referees:
(Germany) Vanessa Anselm
(Sweden) Veronica Lovensnö
Linesmen:
(France) Alexia Cheyroux
(Switzerland) Anina Egli

	0–1	05:36 – Eggli (Herzig)
	0–2	06:44 – Gaberell (Wey, Baechler) (PP)
Narovcová (Malicka, Slavíčková) – 44:04	1–2
Hujová (Velinská, Vocetková) – 47:02	2–2
Mazancová (Vaníčková) – 58:42	3–2

4 min
Penalties
6 min
30
Shots
11

8 January 2023; 14:00	Slovakia	6–3 (2–1, 1–1, 3–1)	Japan	Östersund Arena B, Östersund; Attendance: 143

Game reference

Lívia Debnárová
Goalies
Ririna Takenaka
Referees:
(Latvia) Sintija Čamane
(Sweden) Ida Henriksson
Linesmen:
(Germany) Leonie Ernst
(Netherlands) Britt Kösters

Lopušanová (Tóthová) – 09:08	1–0
	1–1	14:17 – Numabe (Chujo, Murakami)
Karkošková (Lopušanová) – 19:57	2–1
Dobiášová (Tóthová, Krákorová) – 20:16	3–1
	3–2	29:51 – Murakami (Umemori, Chujo) (EA)
Dobiášová (Lacková, Krákorová) – 48:22	4–2
Dobiášová (Tóthová, Krákorová) – 50:37	5–2
	5–3	55:55 – Ito (Murakami) (EA)
Lopušanová (PS) – 58:11	6–3

4 min
Penalties
6 min
29
Shots
25

9 January 2023; 12:00	Japan	1–5 (0–1, 0–2, 1–2)	Czechia	Östersund Arena A, Östersund; Attendance: 126

Game reference

Madoka Sekiguchi
Goalies
Michaela Hesová
Barbora Dalecká
Referees:
(United Kingdom) Hollie Neenan
(Czech Republic) Zuzana Svobodová
Linesmen:
(China) Wang Hui
(Poland) Natalia Witkowska

	0–1	18:06 – Pištěková (Plosová, Vaníčková) (PP)
	0–2	24:28 – Plosová (Šapovalivová)
	0–3	39:33 – Vocetková
A. Tada (Umemori) – 43:22	1–3
	1–4	44:23 – Velinská (Hujová)
	1–5	59:34 – Šapovalivová (Plosová, Pištěková)

8 min
Penalties
6 min
18
Shots
35

9 January 2023; 18:00	Slovakia	4–1 (0–1, 3–0, 1–0)	Switzerland	Östersund Arena B, Östersund; Attendance: 137

Game reference

Lívia Debnárová
Goalies
Talina Benderer
Margaux Favre
Referees:
(United States) Jenna Janshen
(Japan) Anna Kuroda
Linesmen:
(Germany) Caroline Butt
(United States) Breana Kraut

	0–1	08:56 – Rossel (Capezzali)
Lopušanová (SH) – 21:53	1–1
Dobiášová (Lopušanová, Macková) – 24:17	2–1
Lopušanová – 27:57	3–1
Lopušanová (Tóthová) – 44:11	4–1

4 min
Penalties
31 min
28
Shots
19

11 January 2023; 12:00	Czechia	4–3 (2–1, 1–0, 1–2)	Slovakia	Östersund Arena A, Östersund; Attendance: 186

Game reference

Michaela Hesová
Goalies
Lívia Debnárová
Referees:
(Latvia) Sintija Čamane
(United States) Taylor Hanvelt
Linesmen:
(Switzerland) Anina Egli
(Netherlands) Britt Kösters

Šapovalivová (Hujová) (PP) – 03:17	1–0
	1–1	12:28 – Lopušanová (SH)
Juříčková (Vocetková) (PP) – 12:43	2–1
Hotová (Čabelová, Vaníčková) – 35:37	3–1
	3–2	45:38 – Blichová (Stern) (PP)
Plosová (Brichová, Čabelová) (PP) – 51:25	4–2
	4–3	58:34 – Dobiášová (Lopušanová)

6 min
Penalties
14 min
23
Shots
20

11 January 2023; 18:00	Switzerland	2–1 (1–0, 0–0, 1–1)	Japan	Östersund Arena B, Östersund; Attendance: 132

Game reference

Talina Benderer
Margaux Favre
Goalies
Ririna Takenaka
Madoka Sekiguchi
Referees:
(Germany) Vanessa Anselm
(Japan) Anna Kuroda
Linesmen:
(Germany) Caroline Butt
(Germany) Leonie Ernst

Baechler (Inkamp, Wey) – 04:07	1–0
Rossel – 46:39	2–0
	2–1	59:54 – Umemori (Tanabe)

6 min
Penalties
6 min
17
Shots
15

=== Relegation round ===
The third and fourth placed team from Group B played a best-of-three series to determine the relegated team.

12 January 2023; 16:00	Switzerland	5–0 (1–0, 0–0, 4–0)	Japan	Östersund Arena B, Östersund; Attendance: 171

Game reference

Talina Benderer
Goalies
Madoka Sekiguchi
Referees:
(Canada) Jennifer Berezowski
(United Kingdom) Hollie Neenan
Linesmen:
(France) Alexia Cheyroux
(United States) Breana Kraut

Herzig – 19:06	1–0
Gaberell (Balzer, Inkamp) – 41:03	2–0
Meriguet (Gaberell) (EA) – 44:52	3–0
Balzer (Wey, Langenegger) (ENG) – 57:47	4–0
Aymon (ENG) – 58:50	5–0

8 min
Penalties
6 min
19
Shots
21

14 January 2023; 18:00	Japan	1–2 (0–1, 1–0, 0–1)	Switzerland	Östersund Arena B, Östersund; Attendance: 103

Game reference

Ririna Takenaka
Goalies
Talina Benderer
Referees:
(Latvia) Sintija Čamane
(United States) Jenna Janshen
Linesmen:
(France) Alexia Cheyroux
(Germany) Leonie Ernst

	0–1	12:31 – Baechler (Wey, Rossel) (PP)
Odermatt – 31:32	1–1
	1–2	51:33 – Baechler

8 min
Penalties
8 min
19
Shots
20

=== Final round ===
Teams were reseeded for the semifinals in accordance with the following ranking:

1. tier of the group;
2. position in the group.

Rank	Team	Group	Pos
1	Canada	A	1
2	United States	A	2
3	Sweden	A	3
4	Finland	A	4
5	Czechia	B	1
6	Slovakia	B	2

==== Bracket ====
Quarterfinals
12 January
3A Sweden	6
2B Slovakia	1
12 January
4A Finland	3
1B Czechia	2

Semifinals
14 January
1 Canada (OT)	3
4 Finland	2
14 January
2 United States	1
3 Sweden	2

Final
15 January
1 Canada	10
3 Sweden	0
Third place
15 January
2 United States	5
4 Finland	0

==== Quarterfinals ====
12 January 2023; 16:00	Sweden	6–1 (2–1, 2–0, 2–0)	Slovakia	Östersund Arena A, Östersund; Attendance: 528

Game reference

Felicia Frank
Goalies
Lívia Debnárová
Referees:
(United States) Taylor Hanvelt
(Czech Republic) Zuzana Svobodová
Linesmen:
(Czech Republic) Kristina Hájková
(China) Wang Hui

Andersson (Lindeberg, Gustafsson) (PP) – 07:09	1–0
	1–1	09:27 – Lopušanová (Donovalová) (PP)
Raunio (Jungåker, Hedqvist) (PP) – 12:50	2–1
Leijonhielm (Natt och Dag, Hallin) – 23:32	3–1
Natt och Dag (Markström, Raunio) – 30:40	4–1
Hedqvist (Hallin) – 40:29	5–1
Svensson (Markström) – 47:50	6–1

6 min
Penalties
6 min
49
Shots
12

12 January 2023; 20:00	Finland	3–2 (1–0, 0–0, 2–2)	Czechia	Östersund Arena A, Östersund; Attendance: 228

Game reference

Kerttu Kuja-Halkola
Goalies
Michaela Hesová
Referees:
(Sweden) Ida Henriksson
(Sweden) Veronica Lovensnö
Linesmen:
(United States) Melanie Gotsdiner
(Poland) Natalia Witkowska

Salonen (Varjonen, Keränen) (PP) – 08:26	1–0
	1–1	40:44 – Plosová (Šapovalivová)
	1–2	46:07 – Vocetková (PP)
Vanhanen – 52:27	2–2
Salonen (Varjonen, Vanhanen) (PP) – 54:27	3–2

12 min
Penalties
8 min
36
Shots
29

==== Semifinals ====
14 January 2023; 16:00	United States	1–2 (1–0, 0–2, 0–0)	Sweden	Östersund Arena A, Östersund; Attendance: 2,122

Game reference

Annelies Bergmann
Goalies
Felicia Frank
Referees:
(Germany) Vanessa Anselm
(United Kingdom) Hollie Neenan
Linesmen:
(United States) Breana Kraut
(Poland) Natalia Witkowska

DiGirolamo (McCarthy) – 17:16	1–0
	1–1	24:12 – Jungåker (Raunio, Hedqvist) (PP2)
	1–2	26:44 – Lindeberg (Markström) (PP)

18 min
Penalties
12 min
38
Shots
27

14 January 2023; 20:00	Canada	3–2 OT (1–0, 0–1, 1–1) (OT:1–0)	Finland	Östersund Arena A, Östersund; Attendance: 311

Game reference

Hannah Clark
Goalies
Kerttu Kuja-Halkola
Referees:
(Sweden) Veronica Lovensnö
(Czech Republic) Zuzana Svobodová
Linesmen:
(Switzerland) Anina Egli
(United States) Melanie Gotsdiner

Stonehouse (Pais) – 09:47	1–0
	1–1	31:56 – Vanhanen (Schalin)
	1–2	40:08 – Salonen (Vanhanen) (PP)
Law (Pais) – 52:38	2–2
Law – 67:32	3–2

18 min
Penalties
2 min
41
Shots
26

==== Fifth place game ====
14 January 2023; 12:00	Czechia	6–3 (4–0, 1–1, 1–2)	Slovakia	Östersund Arena A, Östersund; Attendance: 146

Game reference

Barbora Dalecká
Goalies
Lívia Debnárová
Soňa Kubániová
Referees:
(Sweden) Ida Henriksson
(Japan) Anna Kuroda
Linesmen:
(Germany) Caroline Butt
(Netherlands) Britt Kösters

Šapovalivová (Vaníčková, Hotová) – 00:10	1–0
Brichová – 00:31	2–0
Prošková (Wojnarová) – 01:07	3–0
Vocetková (Čabelová, Narovcová) – 08:47	4–0
Prošková (Čabelová) – 33:01	5–0
	5–1	37:34 – Lopušanová (Tóthová)
Šapovalivová (Plosová, Slavíčková) (PP) – 51:51	6–1
	6–2	54:03 – Lopušanová (Tóthová)
	6–3	54:23 – Blichová (Lacková)

8 min
Penalties
2 min
29
Shots
19

==== Bronze medal game ====
15 January 2023; 16:00	United States	5–0 (1–0, 2–0, 2–0)	Finland	Östersund Arena A, Östersund; Attendance: 678

Game reference

Annelies Bergmann
Goalies
Kerttu Kuja-Halkola
Referees:
(Latvia) Sintija Čamane
(Sweden) Veronica Lovensnö
Linesmen:
(United States) Melanie Gotsdiner
(United States) Breana Kraut

Dunne (Klepinger, Fanale) – 17:05	1–0
Taber (Scannell) – 34:31	2–0
Distad (Avar) – 36:24	3–0
Lalonde (Lindsay) – 50:29	4–0
Fanale (Dunne, Klepinger) (ENG) – 57:58	5–0

4 min
Penalties
2 min
40
Shots
23

==== Gold medal game ====
15 January 2023; 20:00	Canada	10–0 (5–0, 3–0, 2–0)	Sweden	Östersund Arena A, Östersund; Attendance: 2,700

Game reference

Hannah Clark
Goalies
Felicia Frank
Ida Henriksson
Referees:
(Canada) Jennifer Berezowski
(Czech Republic) Zuzana Svobodová
Linesmen:
(Czech Republic) Kristina Hájková
(Poland) Natalia Witkowska

Kraemer (Law) – 5:16	1–0
Kraemer (Murphy) – 5:41	2–0
Aubin (Murphy, Pickering) – 9:14	3–0
Grober (Baxter, Murphy) (PP) – 10:01	4–0
Kraemer (Pais) – 12:00	5–0
Aubin (Pieckenhagen) – 23:54	6–0
Lunney (Graham) – 25:11	7–0
Alexander (Lunney) – 28:29	8–0
Pieckenhagen (Hurry) – 40:52	9–0
Kraemer (Venusio, Hurry) (PP) – 49:17	10–0

4 min
Penalties
8 min
40
Shots
21

=== Awards and statistics ===
==== Awards ====
Best players selected by the Directorate

Position	Player
Goaltender	(Sweden) Felicia Frank
Defenceman	(Sweden) Mira Jungåker
Forward	(Slovakia) Nela Lopušanová

Source: IIHF

All-Star team

Position	Player
Goaltender	(Sweden) Felicia Frank
Defenceman	(Sweden) Mira Jungåker
Defenceman	(United States) Molly Jordan
Forward	(Slovakia) Nela Lopušanová
Forward	(Finland) Pauliina Salonen
Forward	(Canada) Caitlin Kraemer
MVP	(Slovakia) Nela Lopušanová

Source: IIHF

==== Scoring leaders ====
List shows the top skaters sorted by points, then goals.

Rank	Player	GP	G	A	Pts	+/−	PIM	POS
1	(Slovakia) Nela Lopušanová	5	9	3	12	+5	2	F
2	(Canada) Caitlin Kraemer	5	10	1	11	+10	6	F
3	(United States) Margaret Scannell	5	4	4	8	+4	4	F
4	(Canada) Alex Law	4	3	4	7	+8	2	F
5	(Canada) Emma Pais	5	2	5	7	+13	0	F
6	(Czech Republic) Adéla Šapovalivová	5	4	2	6	+2	2	F
7	(Sweden) Hilda Svensson	6	4	2	6	+2	2	F
8	(United States) Joy Dunne	5	3	3	6	+2	6	F
8	(Czech Republic) Tereza Plosová	5	3	3	6	0	2	F
10	(Slovakia) Ema Tóthová	5	0	6	6	+5	0	F

GP = Games played; G = Goals; A = Assists; Pts = Points; +/− = Plus/minus; PIM = Penalties in minutes; POS = Position
Source: IIHF

==== Leading goaltenders ====
Only the top five goaltenders, based on save percentage, who have played at least 40% of their team's minutes, are included in this list.

Rank	Player	TOI	GA	GAA	SA	Sv%	SO
1	(Canada) Hannah Clark	247:32	5	1.21	103	95.15	1
2	(Switzerland) Talina Benderer	240:38	5	1.25	90	94.44	1
3	(United States) Annelies Bergmann	236:54	8	2.03	117	93.16	1
4	(Czech Republic) Michaela Hesová	212:17	8	2.26	78	89.74	0
5	(Sweden) Felicia Frank	251:26	11	2.62	105	89.52	0

TOI = Time on ice (minutes:seconds); SA = Shots against; GA = Goals against; GAA = Goals against average; Sv% = Save percentage; SO = Shutouts
Source: IIHF

=== Final standings ===
Pos	Grp	Team	Pld	W	OTW	OTL	L	GF	GA	GD	Pts	Final result
1	A	Canada	5	4	1	0	0	28	5	+23	14	Champions
2	A	Sweden (H)	6	3	0	0	3	19	23	−4	9	Runners-up
3	A	United States	5	3	0	0	2	21	9	+12	9	Third place
4	A	Finland	6	1	0	1	4	7	32	−25	4	Fourth place
5	B	Czechia	5	4	0	0	1	20	12	+8	12	Fifth place game
6	B	Slovakia	5	2	0	0	3	17	20	−3	6	Fifth place game
7	B	Switzerland	5	3	0	0	2	12	9	+3	9	Avoided Relegation
8	B	Japan	5	0	0	0	5	6	20	−14	0	Relegated to the Division I A

Source: IIHF
(H) Host

== Division I ==
=== Group A ===
The tournament was held in Ritten, Italy from 9 to 15 January 2023.

Pos	Team	Pld	W	OTW	OTL	L	GF	GA	GD	Pts	Promotion or relegation
1	Germany	5	3	1	1	0	10	4	+6	12	Promoted to the 2024 Top Division
2	Italy (H)	5	2	1	1	1	8	5	+3	9 (Note: France 0–2 Italy)	
3	France	5	2	1	1	1	11	8	+3	9	
4	Hungary	5	2	1	0	2	11	10	+1	8	
5	Austria	5	0	1	2	2	6	11	−5	4	
6	Norway	5	1	0	0	4	8	16	−8	3	Relegated to the 2024 Division I B

Source: IIHF
Rules for classification: 1) points; 2) head-to-head points; 3) head-to-head goal difference; 4) head-to-head number of goals scored; 5) result against closest best-ranked team outside tied teams; 6) result against second-best ranked team outside tied teams; 7) seeding before tournament.
(H) Host

=== Group B ===
The tournament was held in Katowice, Poland from 10 to 15 January 2023.

Pos	Team	Pld	W	OTW	OTL	L	GF	GA	GD	Pts	Promotion or relegation
1	Denmark	4	4	0	0	0	19	3	+16	12	Promoted to the 2024 Division I A
2	Poland (H)	4	3	0	0	1	15	3	+12	9	
3	Spain	4	1	1	0	2	6	9	−3	5	
4	South Korea	4	1	0	1	2	5	12	−7	4	
5	Chinese Taipei	4	0	0	0	4	2	20	−18	0	
–	~~China~~	0	0	0	0	0	0	0	0	0	Withdrawn; relegated to the 2024 Division II A

Source: IIHF
Rules for classification: 1) points; 2) head-to-head points; 3) head-to-head goal difference; 4) head-to-head number of goals scored; 5) result against closest best-ranked team outside tied teams; 6) result against second-best ranked team outside tied teams; 7) seeding before tournament.
(H) Host

== Division II ==
=== Group A ===
The tournament was held in Dumfries, Great Britain from 21 to 27 January 2023.

Pos	Team	Pld	W	OTW	OTL	L	GF	GA	GD	Pts	Promotion or relegation
1	Australia	5	4	0	0	1	16	7	+9	12	Promoted to the 2024 Division I B
2	Latvia	5	2	2	0	1	14	7	+7	10 (Note: Latvia 4 Pts, Netherlands 4 Pts, Great Britain 1 Pt. Latvia defeated Netherlands 2–1 in overtime.)	
3	Netherlands	5	3	0	1	1	9	9	0	10	
4	Great Britain (H)	5	3	0	1	1	11	8	+3	10	
5	Turkey	5	0	1	0	4	6	11	−5	2	
6	Mexico	5	0	0	1	4	6	20	−14	1	Relegated to the 2024 Division II B

Source: IIHF
Rules for classification: 1) points; 2) head-to-head points; 3) head-to-head goal difference; 4) head-to-head number of goals scored; 5) result against closest best-ranked team outside tied teams; 6) result against second-best ranked team outside tied teams; 7) seeding before tournament.
(H) Host

=== Group B ===
The tournament was held in Sofia, Bulgaria from 26 January to 1 February 2023.

Pos	Team	Pld	W	OTW	OTL	L	GF	GA	GD	Pts	Promotion
1	Kazakhstan	5	5	0	0	0	35	5	+30	15	Promoted to the 2024 Division II A
2	Belgium	5	3	1	0	1	22	13	+9	11	
3	Iceland	5	2	1	1	1	15	14	+1	9	
4	New Zealand	5	2	0	0	3	19	14	+5	6	
5	Bulgaria (H)	5	1	0	1	3	15	21	−6	4	
6	Estonia	5	0	0	0	5	1	40	−39	0	

Source: IIHF
Rules for classification: 1) points; 2) head-to-head points; 3) head-to-head goal difference; 4) head-to-head number of goals scored; 5) result against closest best-ranked team outside tied teams; 6) result against second-best ranked team outside tied teams; 7) seeding before tournament.
(H) Host
