= Chinese Taipei women's national under-18 ice hockey team =

Ice hockey team in Taiwan

Chinese Taipei
- Chinese Taipei uses their Olympic flag emblem for their jersey badge.
- Association: Chinese Taipei Ice Hockey Federation
- Head coach: Yin An-Chung
- Assistants: Huang Jen-Hung
- Captain: Hsu Ting-Yu
- Team colors: Blue, red, white
- IIHF code: TPE

First international
- Chinese Taipei 4–1 New Zealand (Kuala Lumpur, Malaysia; 10 March 2018)

Biggest win
- Chinese Taipei 10–0 South Africa (Cape Town, South Africa; 29 January 2026)

Biggest defeat
- Spain 15–0 Chinese Taipei (Jaca, Spain; 8 January 2024)

IIHF World Women's U18 Championship
- Appearances: 5 (first in 2018)
- Best result: 16th (2022)

IIHF Women's Challenge Cup of Asia
- Appearances: 1 (first in 2018)
- Best result: 1st (2018)

International record (W–L–T)
- 10–12–0

The Chinese Taipei women's national under-18 ice hockey team is the women's national under-18 ice hockey team of Taiwan (Republic of China). The team is controlled by Chinese Taipei Ice Hockey Federation, a member of the International Ice Hockey Federation (IIHF). The team made its international debut in 2018 when they competed in, and won, the 2018 IIHF Women's Challenge Cup of Asia.

== History ==
The Chinese Taipei women's national under-18 ice hockey team played its first game in March 2018 against the Thailand women's team during the 2018 IIHF Women's Challenge Cup of Asia being held in Kuala Lumpur, Malaysia. Chinese Taipei won the game 5–3 and went on to win their other two matches against the New Zealand women's under-18 team and Singapore's women's team with the 12–1 win against Singapore currently their largest win on record. Chinese Taipei won the tournament after finishing in first place following their three wins ahead of the second placed New Zealand. Wang Hsuan was named best forward by the IIHF Directorate and Tao Sing-Lin was selected as the best Chinese Taipei player of the tournament. In May 2018 the IIHF announced that Chinese Taipei would enter a team into the IIHF World Women's U18 Championships for 2019.

== International competitions ==
- 2018 IIHF Women's Challenge Cup of Asia Finish: 1st
- 2019 IIHF World Women's U18 Championship Finish: 23rd place (3rd in Division I Group B Qualification)
- 2020 IIHF World Women's U18 Championship Finish: 21st place (1st in Division II Group A)
- 2021 IIHF World Women's U18 Championship Cancelled due to COVID-19 pandemic
- 2022 IIHF World Women's U18 Championship Finish: 16th place (3rd in Division I Group B)
- 2023 IIHF World Women's U18 Championship Finish: 19th place (5th in Division I Group B)
- 2024 IIHF World Women's U18 Championship Finish: 20th place (6th in Division I Group B)
- 2025 IIHF World Women's U18 Championship Finish: 26th place (6th in Division II Group A)
- 2026 IIHF U18 Women's World Championship Finish: ( Division II Group B )

== World Women's U18 Championship record ==
Year	GP	W	OTW	OTL	L	GF	GA	Pts	Rank
2019	5	3	0	0	2	17	16	8	3rd place in Division I B Qualification (23rd place)
2020	3	2	1	0	0	10	7	8	1st place in Division II A (21st place)
2022	4	1	1	0	2	7	16	5	3rd place in Division I B (16th place)
2023	4	0	0	0	4	2	20	0	5th place in Division I B (19th place)
2024	5	1	0	0	4	6	42	3	6th place in Division I B (20th place; Relegated to Division II A)
2025	5	0	0	0	5	8	36	0	6th place in Division II B (26th place; Relegated to Division II B)

*Includes one losses in extra time (in the round robin)

== Players and personnel ==
=== Current roster ===
For the 2018 IIHF Women's Challenge Cup of Asia

#	Name	Pos	S/G	Date of birth
23	Chang Tsai-Chieh	D	R	10 October 2001
4	Cheng Ying	F	L	1 July 2002
16	Ho Ping-Hsiang	F	R	24 October 2001
15	Hsu Ting-Yu	F	L	29 October 2000
10	Huang Yun-Chu	F	R	15 June 2003
7	Jan Ya-Ching	D	R	10 December 2003
18	Kuo Yi-Ting	F	L	22 January 2001
11	Lee Yu-Chieh	D	R	2 December 2000
3	Lin Yang-Chi	D	R	16 April 2002
14	Liu Pei-Chen	F	L	24 September 2002
12	Pan Hsin-Ni	F	R	27 July 2001
21	Kelly Qian	F	R	27 February 2001
9	Tao Sing-Lin	F	R	22 December 2001
17	Tung Szu-Yu	D	L	30 September 2001
1	Wang Chen-Hsin	G	R	21 October 2003
6	Wang Hsuan	F	L	11 November 2003
25	Wang Yu-Chi	G	L	13 June 2000
22	Yu Chia-Lung	D	L	22 April 2002

=== Current team staff ===
For the 2018 IIHF Women's Challenge Cup of Asia

- Head coach: Yin An-Chung Yin
- Assistant coach: Huang Jen-Hung
- Team Leader: Huang Chueh-Yu
- Team Medical Officer: Liao Wei-Chu
