= Spain women's national under-18 ice hockey team =

Spain
- The coat of arms of Spain is the badge used on the players jerseys.
- Association: Federación Española de Deportes de Hielo
- Head coach: (Sweden) Perchristian Yngve
- Assistants: (Spain) Eduardo Martinez (Spain) Koldo Saenz
- Captain: Elena Sans
- Most games: Several players (7)
- Top scorer: Andrea Merino (6)
- Most points: Andrea Merino (9)
- Team colors
- IIHF code: ESP

First international
- Australia 3 – 1 Spain (San Sebastián, Spain; 26 January 2017)

Biggest win
- Spain 15 – 0 Chinese Taipei (Jaca, Spain; 8 January 2024)

Biggest defeat
- Austria 8 – 0 Spain (Katowice, Poland; 10 January 2026); China 8 – 0 Spain (Katowice, Poland; 11 January 2026)

IIHF World Women's U18 Championship - Division I B
- Appearances: 2 (first in 2023)
- Best result: 2nd (2024)

International record (W–L–T)
- 22–8–0

The Spain women's national under-18 ice hockey team is the national under-18 ice hockey team in Spain. The team represents Spain at the International Ice Hockey Federation's IIHF World Women's U18 Division I Group B - Qualifications.

== World Women's U18 Championship record ==
Year	GP	W	L	GF	GA	Pts	Rank
2017	3	2	1	13	9	6	22nd place Division I B Qualification
2018	4	2	2	16	9	6	23rd place Division I B Qualification
2019	4	2	2*	13	5	7	25th place Division I B Qualification
2020	5	5	0	27	4	9	25th place Division II B
2022	5	5	0	26	2	15	19th place Division II (Promoted)
2023	4	2^	2	6	9	5	17th place Division I B
2024	5	4	1	33	4	12	16th place Division I B
2025	5	3^	2	12	15	8	Division I B
2026	5	1	0	4	23	3	Division I B

^Includes one win in extra time (in the round robin)
*Includes one loss in extra time (in the round robin)
