= Iceland women's national under-18 ice hockey team =

Iceland
- Nickname: Íslenska Falcons (Icelandic Falcons)
- Association: Ice Hockey Iceland
- IIHF code: ISL

First international
- Australia 5–1 Iceland (Istanbul, Turkey; 27 June 2022)

Biggest win
- Iceland 24–0 South Africa (Sofia, Bulgaria; 14 January 2024)

Biggest defeat
- Spain 11–0 Iceland (Istanbul, Turkey; 28 June 2022)

IIHF World Women's U18 Championships - Division IIA
- Appearances: 4 (first in 2022)
- Best result: 9th – Div. II Gr. A (27th overall, 2022)

International record (W–L–T)
- 7–7–0

The Iceland women's national under-18 ice hockey team is the women's national Under-18 ice hockey team of Iceland. The team is controlled by the Ice Hockey Iceland, a member of the International Ice Hockey Federation.

== International competitions ==
=== World Women's U18 Championship ===
Year	GP	W	L	GF	GA	Pts	Rank
2022	4	0	4	3	23	0	27th place (Relegated to Division IIB)
2023	5	3^	2*	15	14	8	28th place
2024	5	4	1	33	6	12	28th place

^Includes one win in extra time (in the round robin)
*Includes one loss in extra time (in the round robin)
