= Turkey women's national under-18 ice hockey team =

Turkey
- The crescent moon and a star as seen on the Turkish flag is the badge used on the players jerseys.
- Association: Turkish Ice Hockey Federation
- IIHF code: TUR

First international
- Netherlands 12–1 Turkey (Mexico City, Mexico; 31 January 2018)

Biggest win
- Turkey 12–0 South Africa (Istanbul, Turkey; 21 January 2025)

Biggest defeat
- Kazakhstan 15–0 Turkey (Jaca, Spain; 13 January 2019)

IIHF World Women's U18 Championships - Division II A
- Appearances: 6 (first in 2018)
- Best result: 5th – Div. II Gr. A (24th overall, 2023)

International record (W–L–T)
- 6–22–0

The Turkey women's national under-18 ice hockey team is the women's national Under-18 ice hockey team of Turkey. The team is controlled by the Turkish Ice Hockey Federation, a member of the International Ice Hockey Federation.

== International competitions ==
=== World Women's U18 Championship ===
Year	Div	GP	W	L	GF	GA	Pts	Rank
2018	I B Qual	4	0	4	3	39	0	25th
2019	I B Qual	4	1	3	1	28	0	26th
2020	II B	5	3	2	9	20	6	26th
2022	II A	5	1^	4	4	22	2	24th
2023	II A	5	1^	4	6	20	2	24th
2024	II A	5	0	5	0	38	0	26th (Relegated to the 2025 Div II B)
2025	II B	4	4	0	20	1	12	27th (Promoted to the 2026 Div II A)

^Includes one win in extra time (in the round robin)
