= Mexico women's national under-18 ice hockey team =

Mexico
- Association: Mexico Ice Hockey Federation
- Head coach: (Mexico) Andres de la Garma
- Assistants: (Mexico) Monica Renteria (Mexico) Juan Rojas
- Captain: Andrea Ayala
- Most games: Several players (7)
- Top scorer: Natalia Amaya (7)
- Most points: Natalia Amaya (12)
- Team colors
- IIHF code: MEX

First international
- Mexico 8–1 Romania (San Sebastián, Spain; 26 January 2017)

Biggest win
- Mexico 13–0 South Africa (Sofia, Bulgaria; 13 January 2024); Mexico 14–1 South Africa (Cape Town, South Africa; 1 February 2026)

Biggest defeat
- Great Britain 6–0 Mexico (Istanbul, Turkey; 27 June 2022)

IIHF World Women's Championships - Division II A
- Appearances: 5 (first in 2017)
- Best result: 22nd (2018)

International record (W–L–T)
- 11–20–0

The Mexico women's national under 18 ice hockey team is the national under-18 ice hockey team in Mexico. The team represents Mexico at the International Ice Hockey Federation's IIHF World Women's U18 Division I Group B - Qualifications.

== World Women's U18 Championship record ==
| Year | GP | W | L | GF | GA | Pts | Rank |
|---|---|---|---|---|---|---|---|
| 2017 | 3 | 1 | 2 | 10 | 9 | 6 | 23rd place |
| 2018 | 4 | 3 | 1 | 11 | 9 | 9 | 22nd place |
| 2019 | 4 | 0 | 4 | 2 | 13 | 0 | 27th place |
| 2020 | 5 | 2 | 3 | 12 | 13 | 6 | 27th place |
| 2022 | 5 | 3 | 2* | 14 | 11 | 10 | 25th place |
| 2023 | 5 | 0 | 5* | 6 | 20 | 0 | 25th place (Relegated to Division II B) |
| 2024 | 5 | 2 | 3 | 21 | 10 | 6 | 30th place |

*Includes one loss in extra time (in the round robin)
