= Netherlands women's national under-18 ice hockey team =

Netherlands
- Nickname: Oranje ('Orange,' from De Oranjes)
- Association: Netherlands Ice Hockey Association
- IIHF code: NED

First international
- Netherlands 4–2 Spain (Mexico City, Mexico; 30 January 2018)

Biggest win
- Netherlands 12–1 Turkey (Mexico City, Mexico; 31 January 2018)

Biggest defeat
- China 18–0 Netherlands (Heerenveen, Netherlands; 15 January 2024)

IIHF World Women's U18 Championships - Division IB
- Appearances: 1 (first in 2019)
- Best result: 6th – Div. I Gr. B (20th overall, 2019)

International record (W–L–T)
- 14–13–0

The Netherlands women's national under-18 ice hockey team is the women's national Under-18 ice hockey team of Netherlands. The team is controlled by the Netherlands Ice Hockey Association, a member of the International Ice Hockey Federation.

== International competitions ==
=== World Women's U18 Championship ===
Year	GP	W	L	GF	GA	Pts	Rank
2018	4	4	0	25	5	12	21st place (Promoted to Division IB)
2019	5	0	5	5	19	0	20th place (Relegated to Division IIA)
2020	3	2	1	7	3	6	22nd place
2022	5	2	3*	13	10	7	22nd place
2023	5	3	2*	9	9	10	22nd place
2024	5	3^	2	19	29	8	23rd place

^Includes one win in extra time (in the round robin)
*Includes one loss in extra time (in the round robin)
