= South Africa women's national under-18 ice hockey team =

South Africa
- The flag of South Africa is the badge used on the players jerseys
- Association: South African Ice Hockey Association
- IIHF code: RSA

First international
- Bulgaria 13–1 South Africa (Sofia, Bulgaria; 9 January 2024)

Biggest defeat
- Romania 30–0 South Africa (Cape Town, South Africa; 27 January 2026)

IIHF World Women's U18 Championships - Division IIB
- Appearances: 3 (first in 2024)
- Best result: 6th – Div. II Gr. B (32nd overall, 2024)

International record (W–L–T)
- 0–5–0

The South Africa women's national under-18 ice hockey team is the women's national Under-18 ice hockey team of South Africa. The team is controlled by the South African Ice Hockey Association, a member of the International Ice Hockey Federation.

== International competitions ==
=== World Women's U18 Championship ===
Year	GP	W	L	GF	GA	Pts	Rank
2024	5	0	5	1	85	0	32nd place
