= Kazakhstan women's national under-18 ice hockey team =

Kazakhstan
- Association: Kazakhstan Ice Hockey Federation
- General manager: (Kazakhstan) Serik Imanbayev
- Head coach: (Kazakhstan) Irina Mogilnikova
- Assistants: (Kazakhstan) Alexandr Gustomiasov (Kazakhstan) Alexandr Tebenkov
- Captain: Anna Pyatkova
- Most games: Malika Aldabergenova (17); Alexandra Feklistova (17)
- Top scorer: Anastassiya Petsevich (7)
- Most points: Malika Aldabergenova (15)
- Team colors
- IIHF code: KAZ

First international
- Switzerland 15–1 Kazakhstan (Piešťany, Slovakia; April 3, 2010)

Biggest win
- Kazakhstan 15–0 Romania (Spittal an der Drau, Austria; January 8, 2016); Kazakhstan 15–0 Turkey (Jaca, Spain; 12 January 2019)

Biggest defeat
- Russia 19–0 Kazakhstan (Dmitrov, Russia; March 28, 2011)

IIHF World Women's U18 Championships - Division I A
- Appearances: 2 (first in 2010)
- Best result: 6th (2010, 2011)

International record (W–L–T)
- 15–41–0

The Kazakh women's national under 18 ice hockey team is the national under-18 ice hockey team in Kazakhstan. The team represents Kazakhstan at the International Ice Hockey Federation's IIHF World Women's U18 Division I - Qualifications.

== World Women's U18 Championship record ==
| Year | GP | W | L | GF | GA | Pts | Rank |
|---|---|---|---|---|---|---|---|
| 2010 | 5 | 0 | 5 | 9 | 46 | 0 | 14th place |
| 2011 | 5 | 0 | 5 | 8 | 48 | 0 | 14th place (Relegated to Division I - Qualification) |
| 2012 | 5 | 0 | 5 | 4 | 44 | 0 | 18th place |
| 2013 | 5 | 0 | 5 | 3 | 34 | 0 | 18th place |
| 2014 | 4 | 0 | 4** | 5 | 17 | 2 | 19th place |
| 2015 | 5 | 2^ | 3 | 6 | 14 | 5 | 18th place |
| 2016 | 4 | 3 | 1 | 22 | 7 | 9 | 17th place |
| 2017 | 5 | 0 | 5 | 6 | 23 | 0 | 20th place (Relegated to Division I B - Qualification) |
| 2018 | 4 | 1 | 3 | 20 | 13 | 3 | 24th place |
| 2019 | 4 | 3 | 1* | 26 | 6 | 10 | 21st place |
| 2020 | 4 | 0 | 3** | 6 | 11 | 2 | 24th place |
| 2022 | 5 | 1 | 4 | 4 | 19 | 3 | 26th place (Relegated to Division II B) |
| 2023 | 5 | 5 | 0 | 35 | 5 | 15 | 26th place (Promoted to Division II A) |
| 2024 | 5 | 1 | 4 | 11 | 20 | 3 | 25th place |

*Includes one loss in extra time (in the round robin)
**Includes two losses in extra time (in the round robin)
^Includes one win in extra time (in the round robin)
