= 2026 in ice hockey =

The following is a list of the events taking place in ice hockey for the year 2026 throughout the world.

== Winter Olympics and Paralympics ==
The 2026 Winter Olympics and Paralympics took place in Milan and Cortina d'Ampezzo, Italy. The ice hockey events took place at the PalaItalia Santa Giulia and Fiera Milano Rho in Milan.

- February 5 – 19: Ice hockey at the 2026 Winter Olympics – Women's tournament
  - The United States defeated Canada, 2–1 in overtime, to win their third Olympic gold medal.
  - Switzerland defeated Sweden, 2–1 in overtime, to win the bronze medal.
- February 11 – 22: Ice hockey at the 2026 Winter Olympics – Men's tournament
  - The United States defeated Canada, 2–1 in overtime, to win their third Olympic gold medal.
  - Finland defeated Slovakia, 6–1, to win the bronze medal.
- March 7 – 15: Para ice hockey at the 2026 Winter Paralympics
  - The United States defeated Canada, 6–2, to win their fifth consecutive and sixth overall Paralympic gold medal.
  - China defeated Czechia, 3–2, to win the bronze medal.

== World Championships ==
2026 World Ice Hockey Divisions for the International Ice Hockey Federation (IIHF) are taking place between December 7, 2025 and November 16, 2026.

=== World Junior Ice Hockey Championships ===
- December 26, 2025 – January 5: 2026 IIHF World Junior Championship in (United States) Minneapolis–Saint Paul
  - Sweden defeated Czechia, 4–2, to win their third World Junior Ice Hockey Championship title.
  - Canada defeated Finland, 6–3, to win the bronze medal.
  - Denmark was relegated to Division I – Group A for 2027.

==== Divisions ====
- December 7, 2025 – December 13, 2025: Division I – Group A in Bled
  - Final Round Robin placements: 1. Norway, 2. Kazakhstan, 3. Austria, 4. Slovenia, 5. Ukraine, 6. France
  - Norway was promoted to the Top Division for 2027.
  - France was relegated to Division I – Group B for 2027.
- December 8, 2025 – December 14, 2025: Division I – Group B in Milan
  - Final Round Robin placements: 1. Hungary, 2. Estonia, 3. Lithuania, 4. Poland, 5. Japan, 6. Italy
  - Hungary was promoted to Division I – Group A for 2027.
  - Italy was relegated to Division II – Group A for 2027.
- January 4 – 10: Division II – Group A in Bucharest
  - Final Round Robin placements: 1. South Korea, 2. Great Britain, 3. Croatia, 4. Romania, 5. China, 6. Spain
  - South Korea was promoted to Division I – Group B for 2027.
  - Spain was relegated to Division II – Group B for 2027.
- January 18 – 24: Division II – Group B in Belgrade
  - Final Round Robin placements: 1. Netherlands, 2. Australia, 3. Israel, 4. Serbia, 5. New Zealand, 6. Iceland
  - The Netherlands was promoted to Division II – Group A for 2027.
  - Iceland was relegated to Division III – Group A for 2027.
- January 18 – 24: Division III – Group B in Bishkek
  - Final Round Robin placements: 1. Kyrgyzstan, 2. Hong Kong, 3. Mexico, 4. Luxembourg, 5. South Africa, 6. Iran
  - Kyrgyzstan was promoted to Division III – Group A for 2027.
- January 19 – 25: Division III – Group A in Sofia
  - Final Round Robin placements: 1. Chinese Taipei, 2. Bulgaria, 3. Belgium, 4. Turkey, 5. Thailand, 6. Bosnia and Herzegovina
  - Chinese Taipei was promoted to Division II – Group B for 2027.
  - Bosnia and Herzegovina was relegated to Division III – Group B for 2027.

=== IIHF World Women's U18 Championship ===
- January 10 – 18: 2026 IIHF U18 Women's World Championship in Sydney
  - The United States defeated Canada, 2–0, to win their tenth World Women's U18 Championship title.
  - Czechia defeated Sweden, 4–3, to win the bronze medal.
  - Finland was relegated to Division I – Group A for 2027.

==== Divisions ====
- January 5 – 11: Division I – Group B in Katowice
  - Final Round Robin placements: 1. China, 2. Poland, 3. Austria, 4. Great Britain, 5. Spain, 6. Australia
  - China was promoted to Division I – Group A for 2027.
  - Australia was relegated to Division II – Group A for 2027.
- January 12 – 18: Division I – Group A in Ritten
  - Final Round Robin placements: 1. Germany, 2. Japan, 3. Norway, 4. Denmark, 5. France, 6. Italy
  - Germany was promoted to the Top Division for 2027.
  - Italy was relegated to Division I – Group B for 2027.
- January 19 – 25: Division II – Group A in Istanbul
  - Final Round Robin placements: 1. South Korea, 2. Kazakhstan, 3. Latvia, 4. Netherlands, 5. Turkey, 6. New Zealand
  - South Korea was promoted to Division I – Group B for 2027.
  - New Zealand was relegated to Division II – Group B for 2027.
- January 26 – February 1: Division II – Group B in Cape Town
  - Final Round Robin placements: 1. Romania, 2. Iceland, 3. Chinese Taipei, 4. Mexico, 5. Belgium, 6. South Africa
  - Romania was promoted to Division II – Group A for 2027.
  - South Africa was relegated to Division III for 2027.
- ~~January 29 – February 4: Division III in (Thailand) Bangkok~~
  - The tournament was cancelled due to, "unforeseen circumstances, which made it impossible to stage the tournament as planned."

=== IIHF World U18 Championships ===
- April 22 – May 2: 2026 IIHF World U18 Championships in Piešťany
  - Sweden defeated Slovakia, 4–2, to win their third World U18 Championship title.
  - Czechia defeated Latvia, 4–1, to win the bronze medal.
  - Germany was relegated to Division I – Group A for 2027.

==== Divisions ====
- February 13 – 19: Division III – Group B in Sarajevo
  - Final Round Robin placements: 1. Thailand, 2. Iceland, 3. Bosnia and Herzegovina, 4. Turkmenistan, 5. South Africa, 6. Luxembourg
  - Thailand was promoted to Division III – Group A for 2027.
- March 2 – 8: Division III – Group A in Hong Kong
  - Final Round Robin placements: 1. Uzbekistan, 2. Hong Kong, 3. Israel, 4. Turkey, 5. Bulgaria, 6. New Zealand
  - Uzbekistan was promoted to Division II – Group B for 2027.
  - New Zealand was relegated to Division III – Group B for 2027.
- April 5 – 11: Division II – Group B in Belgrade
  - Final Round Robin placements: 1. Netherlands, 2. Mexico, 3. Serbia, 4. Australia, 5. Belgium, 6. Chinese Taipei
  - The Netherlands was promoted to Division II – Group A for 2027.
  - Chinese Taipei was relegated to Division III – Group A for 2027.
- April 12 – 18: Division II – Group A in Târgu Secuiesc
  - Final Round Robin placements: 1. Japan, 2. China, 3. Croatia, 4. Great Britain, 5. Romania, 6. Spain
  - Japan was promoted to Division I – Group B for 2027.
  - Spain was relegated to Division II – Group B for 2027.
- April 18 – 24: Division I – Group A in Krynica
  - Final Round Robin placements: 1. Switzerland, 2. Kazakhstan, 3. Ukraine, 4. Hungary, 5. Slovenia, 6. Poland
  - Switzerland was promoted to the Top Division for 2027.
  - Poland was relegated to Division I – Group B for 2027.
- April 25 – May 1: Division I – Group B in Tallinn
  - Final Round Robin placements: 1. Austria, 2. Lithuania, 3. France, 4. Estonia, 5. Italy, 6. South Korea
  - Austria was promoted to Division I – Group A for 2027.
  - South Korea was relegated to Division II – Group A for 2027.

=== IIHF Women's World Championship ===
- November 6 – 16: 2026 IIHF Women's World Championship in (Denmark) Herning
  - The United States defeated Canada, 6–2, to win their twelfth Women's World Championship title.
  - Sweden defeated Finland, 2–1 in a shootout, to win the bronze medal.
  - Japan was relegated to Division I – Group A for 2027.

==== Divisions ====
- February 23 – March 1: Division III – Group A in Zagreb
  - Final Round Robin placements: 1. Romania, 2. Thailand, 3. Turkey, 4. Croatia, 5. Serbia, 6. Bulgaria
  - Romania was promoted to Division II – Group B for 2027.
  - Bulgaria was relegated to Division III – Group B for 2027.
- February 28 – March 6: Division III – Group B in Kohtla-Järve
  - Final Round Robin placements: 1. Estonia, 2. Bosnia and Herzegovina, 3. South Africa, 4. Israel, 5. Philippines, 6. Singapore
  - Estonia was promoted to Division III – Group A for 2027.
- March 30 – April 5: Division II – Group B in Hong Kong
  - Final Round Robin placements: 1. Hong Kong, 2. Lithuania, 3. Ukraine, 4. New Zealand, 5. Mexico, 6. Belgium
  - Hong Kong was promoted to Division II – Group A for 2027.
  - Belgium was relegated to Division III – Group A for 2027.
- April 12 – 18: Division I – Group A in Budapest
  - Final Round Robin placements: 1. France, 2. Hungary, 3. Italy, 4. Slovakia, 5. Norway, 6. China
  - France was promoted to the Top Division for 2027.
  - China was relegated to Division I – Group B for 2027.
- April 12 – 18: Division I – Group B in Puigcerdà
  - Final Round Robin placements: 1. Netherlands, 2. Great Britain, 3. Kazakhstan, 4. South Korea, 5. Latvia, 6. Spain
  - Netherlands was promoted to Division I – Group A for 2027.
  - Spain was relegated to Division II – Group A for 2027.
- April 13 – 19: Division II – Group A in Bled
  - Final Round Robin placements: 1. Poland, 2. Slovenia, 3. Chinese Taipei, 4. Australia, 5. Iceland
  - Poland was promoted to Division I – Group B for 2027.
  - Iceland was relegated to Division II – Group B for 2027.
  - North Korea withdrew from the tournament on April 8, 2026, due to logistical issues.

=== IIHF World Championship ===
- May 15 – 31: 2026 IIHF World Championship in Zurich and Fribourg
  - Finland defeated Switzerland, 1–0 in overtime, to win their fifth World Championship title.
  - Norway defeated Canada, 3–2 in overtime, to win the bronze medal.
  - Great Britain and Italy were relegated to Division I – Group A for 2027.

==== Divisions ====
- April 6 – 12: Division II – Group B in Sofia
  - Final Round Robin placements: 1. Israel, 2. New Zealand, 3. Iceland, 4. Bulgaria, 5. Kyrgyzstan, 6. Chinese Taipei
  - No team was promoted to Division II – Group A due to the freezing of the group following their tournament's cancellation.
  - Chinese Taipei was relegated to Division III – Group A for 2027.
- ~~April 12 – 18: Division IV in Kuwait City~~
  - The tournament was postponed due to the 2026 Iran war on March 18, 2026, and later cancelled on March 25, with the group's current composition frozen from promotion and relegation.
- April 13 – 19: Division III – Group A in Cape Town
  - Final Round Robin placements: 1. Turkey, 2. Mexico, 3. Bosnia and Herzegovina, 4. South Africa, 5. Thailand, 6. Turkmenistan
  - Turkey was promoted to Division II – Group B for 2027.
  - Turkmenistan was relegated to Division III – Group B for 2027.
- April 13 – 19: Division III – Group B in Hong Kong
  - Final Round Robin placements: 1. Uzbekistan, 2. North Korea, 3. Hong Kong, 4. Luxembourg, 5. Mongolia, 6. Philippines
  - Uzbekistan was promoted to Division III – Group A for 2027.
  - No team was relegated to Division IV due to the freezing of the group following their tournament's cancellation.
- ~~April 20 – 26: Division II – Group A in (United Arab Emirates) Al Ain~~
  - The tournament was postponed due to the 2026 Iran war on March 18, 2026, and later cancelled on April 7, with the group's current composition frozen from promotion and relegation.
- April 29 – May 5: Division I – Group B in Shenzhen
  - Final Round Robin placements: 1. Estonia, 2. China, 3. Romania, 4. South Korea, 5. Spain, 6. Netherlands
  - Estonia was promoted to Division I – Group A for 2027.
  - No team was relegated to Division II – Group A due to the freezing of the group following their tournament's cancellation.
- May 2 – May 8: Division I – Group A in Sosnowiec
  - Final Round Robin placements: 1. Kazakhstan, 2. Ukraine, 3. France, 4. Poland, 5. Lithuania, 6. Japan
  - Kazakhstan and Ukraine were promoted to the Top Division for 2027.
  - Japan was relegated to Division I – Group B for 2027.

== National Hockey League (NHL) ==
- October 7, 2025 – April 16: 2025–26 NHL season
  - Presidents' Trophy and Western Conference regular-season winners: Colorado Avalanche
  - Eastern Conference regular-season winners: Carolina Hurricanes
  - Art Ross Trophy winner: Connor McDavid (Edmonton Oilers)
  - The 2026 All-Star Game was canceled due to the NHL's Olympic participation, with UBS Arena now scheduled to host the 2027 edition.
- January 2: 2026 Winter Classic at LoanDepot Park in Miami
  - The New York Rangers defeated the Florida Panthers by the score of 5–1.
- February 1: 2026 Stadium Series at Raymond James Stadium in Tampa
  - The Tampa Bay Lightning defeated the Boston Bruins in a shootout by the score of 6–5.
- April 18 – June 14: 2026 Stanley Cup playoffs
  - June 14: The Carolina Hurricanes defeat the Vegas Golden Knights four games to two in the Stanley Cup Finals to win their second Stanley Cup.
- June 26 and 27: 2026 NHL entry draft at KeyBank Center in Buffalo
  - #1: Gavin McKenna (to the Toronto Maple Leafs from the Penn State Nittany Lions)

== Kontinental Hockey League (KHL) ==
- September 5, 2025 – March 20: 2025–26 KHL season
  - Continental Cup and Eastern Conference regular-season winner: Metallurg Magnitogorsk
  - Western Conference regular-season winner: Lokomotiv Yaroslavl
- March 23 – May 21: 2026 Gagarin Cup playoffs
  - May 21: Lokomotiv Yaroslavl defeats Ak Bars Kazan, four games to two in the Gagarin Cup Finals, to win their second consecutive and second overall Gagarin Cup.

== Professional Women's Hockey League (PWHL) ==
- November 21 – April 25: 2025–26 PWHL season
  - Regular season winner: Montreal Victoire
  - April 30 – May 20: 2026 Walter Cup playoffs
    - May 20: The Montreal Victoire defeat the Ottawa Charge three games to one in the 2026 Walter Cup Finals to win their first Walter Cup.

== North America ==
=== Minor league professional (AHL/ECHL/SPHL) ===
- October 10, 2024 – April 19: 2025–26 AHL season
  - Macgregor Kilpatrick Trophy & Atlantic Division winners: Providence Bruins
  - Central Division: Grand Rapids Griffins
  - Pacific Division: Ontario Reign
  - North Division: Laval Rocket
  - January 23, 2026: 2026 Outdoor Classic at Tradition Veterans' Complex in Hastings
    - The Milwaukee Admirals defeated the Iowa Wild, 3–2 in overtime.
  - April 21 – June 19: 2026 Calder Cup playoffs
    - June 19: The Toronto Marlies defeat the Chicago Wolves four games to one to win their second Calder Cup title.
- October 17, 2024 – April 19: 2025–26 ECHL season
  - 41 games were postponed league-wide between December 26 and December 29, 2025, after the Professional Hockey Players' Association's ECHL contingent voted to go on strike. A tentative agreement was reached on December 27 to end the strike, which was subsequently ratified by the PHPA on December 30.
  - Brabham Cup & Mountain Division winners: Kansas City Mavericks
  - South Division: Florida Everblades
  - Central Division: Fort Wayne Komets
  - North Division: Wheeling Nailers
  - April 23 – June 15: 2026 Kelly Cup playoffs
    - June 15: The Florida Everblades defeat the Kansas City Mavericks four games to two to win their fifth Kelly Cup title.
- October 17, 2025 – April 4: 2025–26 SPHL season
  - William B. Coffey Trophy winners: Peoria Rivermen
  - April 8 – May 9: 2026 President's Cup playoffs
    - May 9: The Evansville Thunderbolts defeat the Peoria Rivermen three games to two to win their second consecutive and second overall President's Cup title.

=== Junior (OHL/QMJHL/USHL/WHL) ===
- September 17, 2025 – April 4: 2025–26 USHL season
  - Anderson Cup and Eastern Conference winners: Youngstown Phantoms
  - Western Conference winners: Sioux Falls Stampede
  - April 9 – May 23: 2026 Clark Cup playoffs
    - May 23: The Sioux Falls Stampede defeat the Muskegon Lumberjacks three games to one to win their fourth Clark Cup title.
- September 18, 2025 – March 21: 2025–26 QMJHL season
  - Jean Rougeau Trophy and Eastern Conference regular-season winners: Moncton Wildcats
  - Western Conference regular-season winners: Rouyn-Noranda Huskies
  - March 27 – May 17: 2026 QMJHL playoffs
    - May 17: The Chicoutimi Saguenéens defeat the Moncton Wildcats four games to two to win their third Gilles-Courteau Trophy title.
- September 18, 2025 – March 22: 2025–26 OHL season
  - Hamilton Spectator Trophy & East Division winners: Brantford Bulldogs
  - Midwest Division: Kitchener Rangers
  - Central Division: Barrie Colts
  - West Division: Windsor Spitfires
  - March 26 – May 12: 2026 OHL playoffs
    - May 12: The Kitchener Rangers defeat the Barrie Colts in a four-game sweep to win their fifth J. Ross Robertson Cup title.
- September 19, 2025 – March 22: 2025–26 WHL season
  - Scotty Munro Memorial Trophy & U.S. Division winners: Everett Silvertips
  - East Division: Prince Albert Raiders
  - Central Division: Medicine Hat Tigers
  - B.C. Division: Penticton Vees
  - March 27 – May 15: 2026 WHL playoffs
    - May 15: The Everett Silvertips defeat the Prince Albert Raiders four games to one to win their first Ed Chynoweth Cup title.
- May 22 – 31: 2026 Memorial Cup at Prospera Place in Kelowna
  - May 31: The Kitchener Rangers defeat the Everett Silvertips, 6–2, to win their third Memorial Cup title.

=== Collegiate ===
==== NCAA Division I (USA) ====
- March 12 – 22: 2026 NCAA Division I women's ice hockey tournament (Frozen Four at Pegula Ice Arena in University Park)
  - March 22: The Wisconsin Badgers defeat the Ohio State Buckeyes 3–2 to win their second consecutive and ninth overall NCAA Division I women's ice hockey title.
- March 26 – April 11: 2026 NCAA Division I men's ice hockey tournament (Frozen Four at T-Mobile Arena in Paradise)
  - April 11: The Denver Pioneers defeat the Wisconsin Badgers 2–1 to win their 11th NCAA Division I men's hockey title.

==== U Sports (Canada) ====
- March 19 – 22: 2026 U Sports University Cup Tournament at Scotiabank Centre in Halifax
  - March 22: The UQTR Patriotes defeat the Saint Mary's Huskies, 3–2 in overtime, to win their sixth University Cup title.
  - March 22: The UNB Reds defeat the Windsor Lancers, 5–1, in the third-place game.
- March 19 – 22: 2026 U Sports Women's Ice Hockey Championship at Woolwich Memorial Centre in Elmira
  - March 22: The Montreal Carabins defeat the Concordia Stingers, 5–2, to win their third Golden Path Trophy title.
  - March 22: The UNB Reds defeat the Guelph Gryphons, 2–1, in the third-place game.

== Europe ==
=== Tournaments ===
- August 28, 2025 – March 3: 2025–26 Champions Hockey League
  - (Sweden) Frölunda HC defeated (Sweden) Luleå HF, 3–2 in overtime, to win their fifth Champions Hockey League title.
  - (Sweden) Brynäs IF and (Switzerland) EV Zug finished in joint third place, as the losing semi-finalists.
- October 14, 2025 – January 17: 2025–26 IIHF Continental Cup
  - The (United Kingdom) Nottingham Panthers defeated (Kazakhstan) Torpedo Ust-Kamenogorsk, 4–2, to win their second IIHF Continental Cup title.
  - (Denmark) Herning Blue Fox defeated (Poland) GKS Katowice, 3–2 in a shootout, to win the bronze medal.

=== Leagues ===
- September 9, 2025 – March 6: 2025–26 Czech Extraliga season
  - Presidential Cup winner: Dynamo Pardubice
  - March 9 – April 28: 2026 Czech Extraliga playoffs
    - Dynamo Pardubice defeats Oceláři Třinec, four games to two, to win their fourth Extraliga title.
- September 9, 2025 – March 9: 2025–26 National League season
  - March 12 – April 30: 2026 National League playoffs
    - HC Fribourg-Gottéron defeats HC Davos, four games to three, to win their first National League title.
- September 9, 2025 – March 15: 2025–26 DEL season
  - Dresdner Eislöwen joined the league after promotion from the DEL2, but were subsequently relegated back to the DEL2.
  - March 17 – May: 2026 DEL playoffs
    - Eisbären Berlin defeats Adler Mannheim, four games to one, to win their third consecutive and 12th overall DEL title.
- September 9, 2025 – March 17: 2025–26 Liiga season
  - March 20 – May 13: 2026 Liiga playoffs
    - Tappara defeats KooKoo, four games to three, to win their 14th Liiga title, and 21st Finnish championship.
- September 13, 2025 – March 14: 2025–26 SHL season
  - Djurgårdens IF joined the league after promotion from the HockeyAllsvenskan.
  - Leksands IF were relegated to the HockeyAllsvenskan.
  - March 17 – May 2: 2026 SHL playoffs
    - Skellefteå AIK defeats Rögle BK, four games to one, to win their fifth Le Mat Trophy title.

== Asia ==
- September 6, 2025 – March 15: 2025–26 Asia League Ice Hockey season
  - Stars Kobe joined ALIH as an expansion team.
  - Leader's Flag winners: Red Eagles Hokkaido
  - March 19 – April 2: 2026 ALIH playoffs
    - Red Eagles Hokkaido defeated HL Anyang in a three-game sweep to win their third Asia League championship.
- April 27 – May 3: 2026 IIHF U18 Asia Cup in Bishkek
  - Uzbekistan defeated Kyrgyzstan, 3–2, to win their third Men's U18 Asia Cup title.
  - Mongolia defeated Indonesia, 7–2, to win the bronze medal.

== Deaths ==
=== January ===
- David Branch, 77, Canadian executive (Ontario Hockey League, Canadian Hockey League)
- Bob Pulford, 89, Canadian Hall of Fame left wing (Toronto Maple Leafs, Los Angeles Kings), coach (Los Angeles Kings, Chicago Blackhawks), four-time Stanley Cup champion (1962–1964, 1967)
- Glenn Hall, 94, Canadian Hall of Fame goaltender (Detroit Red Wings, Chicago Black Hawks, St. Louis Blues), Stanley Cup champion (1961)
- Jason Lafreniere, 59, Canadian centre (Quebec Nordiques, New York Rangers, Tampa Bay Lightning)
- Phil Goyette, 92, Canadian centre (Montreal Canadiens, New York Rangers, Buffalo Sabres) and coach (New York Islanders), four-time Stanley Cup champion (1957–1960)
- Bob Jones, 80, Canadian left wing (New York Rangers, Los Angeles Sharks, New York Raiders/Golden Blades/Jersey Knights)
- Chuck Lefley, 76, Canadian centre (Montreal Canadiens, St. Louis Blues, Jokerit), two-time Stanley Cup champion (1971, 1973)

=== February ===
- Jim Morrison, 94, Canadian defenceman (Boston Bruins, Toronto Maple Leafs, Pittsburgh Penguins), coach (Baltimore Clippers, Kitchener Rangers, Kingston Canadians), and scout (Boston Bruins)
- Jim Robson, 91, Canadian radio and television broadcaster (Vancouver Canucks, Hockey Night in Canada), Foster Hewitt Memorial Award winner
- Pentti Lindegren, 86, Finnish defenceman (HIFK, AIK IF, Karhu-Kissat) and television broadcaster (MTV3, Canal+)
- František Mašlaň, 93, Czech defenceman (ČSSZ Prostějov, TJ Brno) and Olympian (1960)
- Guyle Fielder, 95, American centre (Chicago Black Hawks, Detroit Red Wings, Seattle Totems)
- Serge Lajeunesse, 75, Canadian defenceman (Detroit Red Wings, Philadelphia Flyers)
- Scotty Morrison, 95, Canadian Hall of Fame referee (National Hockey League) and executive (Hockey Hall of Fame)

=== March ===
- Yuri Korolev, 91, Russian administrator (Soviet national team, Ice Hockey Federation of Russia, International Ice Hockey Federation), Paul Loicq Award winner
- Troy Murray, 63, Canadian centre (Chicago Blackhawks, Winnipeg Jets, Colorado Avalanche) and television broadcaster (Chicago Blackhawks), Stanley Cup champion (1996)
- Rauno Lehtiö, 84, Finnish defenceman (Koovee) and Olympian (1964)
- Vladimír Stránský, 78, Czech left wing (HC Košice, TJ Vítkovice, TJ Gottwaldov)
- Bill Riley, 75, Canadian right wing (Washington Capitals, Winnipeg Jets) and coach (Amherst Ramblers, Miramichi Timberwolves, Moncton Wildcats)

=== April ===
- Dick Roberge, 91, Canadian right wing (Johnstown Jets, New Westminster Royals, Pittsburgh Hornets), coach (Johnstown Jets, Johnstown Wings), and actor (Slap Shot)
- John Garrett, 74, Canadian goaltender (Hartford Whalers, Quebec Nordiques, Vancouver Canucks) and television broadcaster (Hockey Night in Canada, Edmonton Oilers, Vancouver Canucks)
- Matt Davidson, 48, Canadian right wing (Columbus Blue Jackets, DEG Metro Stars, KalPa) and executive (Portland Winterhawks)

=== May ===
- Péter Bikár, 80, Hungarian centre (Fehérvári Titánok, Ferencvárosi TC) and Olympian (1964)
- Pat Graham, 64, Canadian left wing (Pittsburgh Penguins, Toronto Maple Leafs)
- Punch McLean, 93, Canadian coach (Estevan/New Westminster Bruins) and executive (New Westminster Bruins)
- Paul Boutilier, 63, Canadian defenceman (New York Islanders, Boston Bruins, Winnipeg Jets) and coach (Saint Mary's Huskies, Nashville Predators, Saint John Sea Dogs), Stanley Cup champion (1983)
- Robert Irving, 71, Canadian businessman and executive (Moncton Wildcats)
- Forbes Kennedy, 90, Canadian centre (Detroit Red Wings, Boston Bruins, Philadelphia Flyers) and coach (Winston-Salem Polar Twins, Richmond Wildcats, Charlottetown Eagles/Abbies)
- Claude Lemieux, 60, Canadian right wing (Montreal Canadiens, New Jersey Devils, Colorado Avalanche) and executive (Phoenix Roadrunners), four-time Stanley Cup champion (1993, 1995–1996, 2001)
- Dennis Hull, 81, Canadian left wing (Chicago Black Hawks, Detroit Red Wings)

=== June ===
- Cliff Fletcher, 90, Canadian Hall of Fame executive (Atlanta/Calgary Flames, Toronto Maple Leafs, Phoenix Coyotes), Stanley Cup champion (1989)
- Gerry Meehan, 79, Canadian left wing (Buffalo Sabres, Atlanta Flames, Washington Capitals) and executive (Buffalo Sabres)
- Leonid Shchukin, 80, Russian forward (SKA Novosibirsk, Lokomotiv/Khimik Omsk) and coach (Avangard Omsk)
- Kyle Calder, 47, Canadian left wing (Chicago Blackhawks, Los Angeles Kings, Philadelphia Flyers)
- Bob Winograd, 76, Canadian defenceman (New York Raiders/Golden Blades/Jersey Knights, San Diego Mariners)
- Ab DeMarco Jr., 77, American-Canadian defenceman (New York Rangers, Vancouver Canucks, Los Angeles Kings)
- Daniel Poudrier, 62, Canadian defenceman (Quebec Nordiques)

=== July ===
- Josef Kompalla, 90, Polish-German defenceman (Gorník Katowice, Preussen Krefeld) and referee (International Ice Hockey Federation), IIHF Hall of Fame inductee
- Eddie Joyal, 86, Canadian centre (Detroit Red Wings, Los Angeles Kings, Alberta/Edmonton Oilers)
- Alexei Murygin, 39, Russian goaltender (Amur Khabarovsk, Lokomotiv Yaroslavl, Metallurg Magnitogorsk) and coach (MHK Atlant Mytishchi)

=== August ===
- Sepp Puschnig, 79, Austrian forward (EC KAC) and Olympian (1964, 1968, 1976), IIHF Hall of Fame inductee
- Peter Maher, 79, Canadian radio broadcaster (Toronto Maple Leafs, Calgary Flames, Sportsnet), Foster Hewitt Memorial Award winner
- Jim Powers, 89, Canadian left wing (Vancouver Canucks, Seattle Totems, Los Angeles Blades)

=== September ===
- Radim Raděvič, 59, Czech forward (TJ Zlín, ASVŠ Dukla Trenčín, HC Bohemex Trade Opava) and Olympian (1988)
- André Pronovost, 90, Canadian left wing (Montreal Canadiens, Boston Bruins, Detroit Red Wings) and coach (Shawinigan Dynamos), four-time Stanley Cup champion (1957–1960)
- Barry Melrose, 70, Canadian-American defenceman (Winnipeg Jets, Toronto Maple Leafs, Detroit Red Wings), coach (Los Angeles Kings, Tampa Bay Lightning), and television broadcaster (ESPN, NHL Network)
- Brent Peterson, 68, Canadian right wing (Buffalo Sabres, Vancouver Canucks, Hartford Whalers), coach (Hartford Whalers, Portland Winterhawks, Nashville Predators), and radio broadcaster (Nashville Predators)
- Cal Nichols, 84, Canadian businessman (Edmonton Oilers)
- Ken Laufman, 94, Canadian centre (Kitchener-Waterloo Dutchmen, Johnstown Jets, Portland Buckaroos), Olympic silver (1960) and bronze (1956) medalist
- Hans Andersson-Tvilling, 98, Swedish centre (Djurgårdens IF), Olympic bronze medalist (1952), World Championships gold (1953), silver (1951), and bronze (1954) medalist
- Jack Dale, 80, American left wing (Minnesota Golden Gophers, Johnstown Jets, Seattle Totems) and Olympian (1968)
- Ron Hurst, 95, Canadian right wing (Toronto Maple Leafs)
- George N. Gillett Jr., 87, American businessman (Montreal Canadiens)
- Pierre Plante, 75, Canadian right wing (Philadelphia Flyers, St. Louis Blues, New York Rangers)

=== October ===
- Lyle Odelein, 58, Canadian defenceman (Montreal Canadiens, New Jersey Devils, Columbus Blue Jackets), Stanley Cup champion (1993)
- Vlado Jug, 79, Slovenian defenceman (Yugoslav national team) and Olympian (1968)
- Myles O'Connor, 59, Canadian defenceman (New Jersey Devils, Mighty Ducks of Anaheim)
- Bobby Gould, 69, Canadian right wing (Atlanta/Calgary Flames, Washington Capitals, Boston Bruins), coach (Sarnia Sting), and executive (Sarnia Sting)
- Heikki Mälkiä, 68, Finnish centre (SaiPa, JYP Jyväskylä) and coach (SaiPa, Ilves, HK Jesenice)
- Gregg Boddy, 77, Canadian defenceman (Vancouver Canucks, San Diego Mariners, Edmonton Oilers)
- Ron Duguay, 69, Canadian centre (New York Rangers, Detroit Red Wings, Los Angeles Kings), coach (Jacksonville Barracudas), and television broadcaster (MSG Network)
- Ion Bașa, 82, Romanian centre (Miercurea Ciuc, Dinamo București), coach (Miercurea Ciuc, Ferencvárosi TC, Romanian men's national team), executive (Romanian men's under-18 team, Romanian national junior team), and Olympian (1968)
- André Lacroix, 81, Canadian centre (Philadelphia Flyers, New York Golden Blades/Jersey Knights/San Diego Mariners, New England/Hartford Whalers), coach (University School), and radio broadcaster (Hartford Whalers), World Hockey Association all-time leading scorer
- Matt Pavelich, 92, Canadian Hall of Fame linesman (National Hockey League) and executive (United Hockey League)

=== November ===
- Jeannot Gilbert, 85, Canadian centre (Boston Bruins, Hershey Bears, Quebec Nordiques)
- Mikhail Vasiliev, 64, Russian left wing (CSKA Moscow, Torpedo Yaroslavl, HC Bolzano), Olympic gold medalist (1984), World Championship gold medalist (1983, 1985, 1987)
- Rick Kessell, 77, Canadian centre (Pittsburgh Penguins, California Golden Seals)
- Bobby Sheehan, 77, Canadian centre (Montreal Canadiens, California Golden Seals, New York Raiders/Golden Blades/Jersey Knights), Stanley Cup champion (1971)
- Don MacAdam, 76, Canadian defenceman (Mohawk Valley Comets, Winston-Salem Polar Twins, Greensboro Generals), coach (UNB Reds, Detroit Red Wings, Dayton Bombers), and executive (Charlotte Checkers, Dayton Bombers, Hungarian men's national team)
- Tapio Koskinen, 73, Finnish forward (Ässät) and Olympian (1976)
- Bill Watters, 83, Canadian executive (Toronto Maple Leafs, Canadian men's national team), television broadcaster (Hockey Central), and radio broadcaster (Prime Time Sports, The Bill Watters Show)

== See also ==
- 2025 in ice hockey
- 2026 in sports
