= 2018 IIHF Women's Challenge Cup of Asia =

Tournament details
- Host country: Malaysia
- Venue: 1 (in 1 host city)
- Dates: 8–11 March 2018
- Teams: 4

Final positions
- Champions: Chinese Taipei U18 (1st title)
- Runners-up: New Zealand U18
- Third place: Thailand
- Fourth place: Singapore

Tournament statistics
- Games played: 6
- Goals scored: 55 (9.17 per game)
- Attendance: 1,009 (168 per game)
- Scoring leader(s): (Thailand) Nuchanat Ponglerkdee (New Zealand) Harriet Fuller (8 points)

Awards
- MVP: (Thailand) Nuchanat Ponglerkdee

The 2018 IIHF Women's Challenge Cup of Asia was an international women's ice hockey tournament run by the International Ice Hockey Federation. The tournament took place between 8 March and 11 March 2018 in Kuala Lumpur, Malaysia and was the sixth edition held since its formation in 2010 under the IIHF Challenge Cup of Asia series of tournaments. Chinese Taipei's under-18 team won the tournament after winning all three of their round-robin games and finishing first in the standings. The New Zealand under-18 team finished in second place and Thailand finished third.

== Overview ==
The 2018 IIHF Women's Challenge Cup of Asia began on 8 March 2018 in Kuala Lumpur, Malaysia with games played at the Malaysia National Ice Skating Stadium (MyNISS). The Women's competition was split into two tournaments for 2018 due to the increase from seven to eight teams. The defending champions New Zealand's under-18 team (New Zealand U18), Thailand and Singapore returned after finishing in the top three of the 2017 tournament. Chinese Taipei's under-18 team (Chinese Taipei U18) was included as the fourth team in the competition, making their debut in women's under-18 international competition. India, the Philippines, the United Arab Emirates and Malaysia, who finished fourth through to seventh in 2017, were placed into the newly created Division I tournament. Both 2018 tournaments ran alongside each other with all games being held at the Malaysia National Ice Skating Stadium.

The tournament consisted of a single round-robin with each team competing in three games. Chinese Taipei U18 won the tournament after winning all three of their games and finished first in the standings. New Zealand U18 finished second after losing only to Chinese Taipei U18 and Thailand finished in third. Thailand's Nuchanat Ponglerkdee and New Zealand's Harriet Fuller led the tournament in scoring with eight points each with Ponglerkdee also being named the most valuable player. Wasunun Angkulpattanasuk of Thailand finished as the tournaments leading goaltender with a save percentage of 94.12 and was awarded best goaltender by the IIHF Directorate. Chinese Taipei's Hsuan Wang was named best forward and Sirikarn Jittresin of Thailand was named best defenceman.

== Standings ==
The final standings of the tournament.

Team	Pld	W	OTW	OTL	L	GF	GA	GD	Pts
Chinese Taipei U18	3	3	0	0	0	21	5	+16	9
New Zealand U18	3	2	0	0	1	16	7	+9	6
Thailand	3	1	0	0	2	13	7	+6	3
Singapore	3	0	0	0	3	5	36	−31	0

Source: IIHF

== Fixtures ==
All times are local. (MST – UTC+8)

8 March 2018; 15:30	Singapore	3 – 14 (1–4, 1–3, 1–7)	New Zealand U18	MyNISS; Attendance: 139

Game reference
12 min	Penalties	0 min
9	Shots	54

8 March 2018; 19:00	Thailand	3 – 5 (1–2, 1–2, 1–1)	Chinese Taipei U18	MyNISS; Attendance: 207

Game reference
16 min	Penalties	4 min
12	Shots	64

10 March 2018; 15:30	Thailand	10 – 1 (3–1, 0–0, 7–0)	Singapore	MyNISS; Attendance: 114

Game reference
12 min	Penalties	18 min
45	Shots	34

10 March 2018; 19:00	New Zealand U18	1 – 4 (0–2, 0–0, 1–2)	Chinese Taipei U18	MyNISS; Attendance: 182

Game reference
10 min	Penalties	4 min
15	Shots	51

11 March 2018; 15:30	New Zealand U18	1 – 0 (0–0, 1–0, 0–0)	Thailand	MyNISS; Attendance: 175

Game reference
0 min	Penalties	4 min
38	Shots	25

11 March 2018; 19:00	Chinese Taipei U18	12 – 1 (5–0, 4–1, 3–0)	Singapore	MyNISS; Attendance: 192

Game reference
8 min	Penalties	8 min
46	Shots	20

== Scoring leaders ==
List shows the top ten skaters sorted by points, then goals, assists, and the lower penalties in minutes.

Player (Team)	GP	G	A	Pts	+/–	PIM	POS
(Thailand) Nuchanat Ponglerkdee (THA)	3	6	2	8	+7	4	F
(New Zealand) Harriet Fuller (NZL)	3	2	6	8	+6	4	D
(New Zealand) Jana Kivell (NZL)	3	3	4	7	+7	0	F
(New Zealand) Beth Scott (NZL)	3	6	0	6	–1	0	F
(Chinese Taipei) Huang Yun-chu (TPE)	3	4	2	6	+7	4	F
(Chinese Taipei) Wang Hsuan (TPE)	3	3	2	5	+6	0	F
(Chinese Taipei) Pan Hsin-ni (TPE)	3	2	3	5	+7	2	F
(Singapore) Elizabeth Chia (SGP)	3	2	2	4	–7	4	F
(Thailand) Wirasinee Rattananai (THA)	3	2	2	4	–1	6	F
(Chinese Taipei) Tao Sing-lin (TPE)	3	2	2	4	+6	2	F

== Leading goaltenders ==
Only the top goaltenders, based on save percentage, who have played at least 40% of their team's minutes are included in this list.

Player (Team)	MIP	SOG	GA	GAA	SVS%	SO
(Thailand) Wasunun Angkulpattanasuk (THA)	119:11	102	6	3.02	94.12	0
(New Zealand) Lilly Forbes (NZL)	151:56	78	5	1.97	93.59	1
(Chinese Taipei) Wang Yu-chi (TPE)	120:00	27	4	2.00	85.19	0
(Singapore) Qina Foo (SGP)	175:57	142	34	11.59	76.06	0

== See also ==
- 2018 IIHF Women's Challenge Cup of Asia Division I
