= 2026 IIHF U18 Women's World Championship Division I =

International youth ice hockey tournament

Tournament details
- Host countries: Italy; Poland
- Venues: 2 (in 2 host cities)
- Dates: 12–18 January 2026; 5–11 January 2026
- Teams: 12

The 2026 IIHF U18 Women's World Championship Division I consisted of two international under-18 women's ice hockey tournaments organized by the International Ice Hockey Federation (IIHF). Division I A represented the second tier and Division I B the third tier of the IIHF U18 Women's World Championship.

== Group A tournament ==
2026 IIHF U18 Women's World Championship Division I A

Tournament details
- Host country: Italy
- City: Ritten
- Venue: 1 (in 1 host city)
- Dates: 12–18 January 2026
- Teams: 6

Tournament statistics
- Games played: 15
- Goals scored: 92 (6.13 per game)
- Attendance: 3,706 (247 per game)
- Scoring leader: (France) Clémence Boudin (11 points)

Official website
- www.iihf.com

The Division I Group A tournament was played in Ritten, Italy, from 12 to 18 January 2026.

=== Participating teams ===
Team	Qualification
Japan	placed 8th in Top Division last year and were relegated
Italy	hosts; placed 2nd in Division I A last year
Germany	placed 3rd in Division I A last year
Norway	placed 4th in Division I A last year
France	placed 5th in Division I A last year
Denmark	placed 1st in Division I B last year and were promoted

=== Standings ===
Pos	Team	Pld	W	OTW	OTL	L	GF	GA	GD	Pts	Promotion or relegation
1	Germany	5	4	0	1	0	12	5	+7	13	Promotion to the 2027 Top Division
2	Japan	5	4	0	0	1	34	7	+27	12	
3	France	5	2	1	0	2	13	12	+1	8	
4	Norway	5	2	0	1	2	10	23	−13	7	
5	Denmark	5	1	1	0	3	15	18	−3	5	
6	Italy (H)	5	0	0	0	5	8	27	−19	0	Relegation to the 2027 Division I B

Source: IIHF
Rules for classification: 1) points; 2) head-to-head points; 3) head-to-head goal difference; 4) head-to-head number of goals scored; 5) result against closest best-ranked team outside tied teams; 6) result against second-best ranked team outside tied teams; 7) seeding before tournament.
(H) Host

=== Match results ===
All times are local (Central European Time; UTC+1).

12 January 2026; 13:00	France	2–1 OT (0–0, 0–1, 1–0) (OT: 1–0)	Germany	Ritten Arena; Attendance: 120

Game reference

Lysa Nogaretto
Goalies
Tara Bach
Referees:
(Belgium) Marine Dinant
(United States) Charlotte Hurley
Linesmen:
(Canada) Joanie Duchesneau
(Austria) Anja Klemm

	0–1	30:27 – Boico (Multerer)
Bernel (Boudin) (PP) – 41:50	1–1
Boudin (Moussier) – 63:40	2–1

4 min
Penalties
10 min
24
Shots
43

12 January 2026; 16:30	Denmark	3–6 (1–1, 1–3, 1–2)	Japan	Ritten Arena; Attendance: 210

Game reference

Mila Petersen
Goalies
Rin Kawaguchi
Referees:
(Germany) Vanessa Anselm
(Canada) Marie-Ève Couture
Linesmen:
(Italy) Anna Callovini
(Denmark) Cassandra Repstock-Romme

	0–1	09:39 – Kakuta (Baba) (SH)
F. Petersen (Lundmark, Ma. Petersen) – 15:50	1–1
Christensen – 23:14	2–1
	2–2	31:31 – Fukuzawa (Terauchi, Numabe)
	2–3	32:37 – Akimoto (Kiyokawa, Kakuta)
	2–4	38:17 – Yamaguchi (Kiyokawa, Kakuta)
	2–5	43:45 – Kiyokawa (Kakuta)
Bergmann (Christensen) – 53:13	3–5
	3–6	58:53 – Fukuzawa (Baba) (EN)

6 min
Penalties
6 min
16
Shots
44

12 January 2026; 20:00	Norway	3–2 (0–0, 2–2, 1–0)	Italy	Ritten Arena; Attendance: 380

Game reference

Tuva Are-Ekström
Goalies
Lucrezia La Sala
Referees:
(Finland) Kaisa Ketonen
(Sweden) Sabina Küller
Linesmen:
(Czech Republic) Eliška Bublíková
(Sweden) Wilma Westlund

	0–1	28:36 – Dal Pont (Franci)
Knardahl (Jolma-Stensland, Raknes) – 30:14	1–1
Østeraas (Stavnes, Lie) – 31:38	2–1
	2–2	37:31 – De Bortoli
Østeraas (Lie, Stavnes) – 45:15	3–2

4 min
Penalties
4 min
34
Shots
16

13 January 2026; 13:00	Germany	2–1 (0–0, 0–0, 2–1)	Denmark	Ritten Arena; Attendance: 190

Game reference

Tara Bach
Goalies
Anja Poulsen
Referees:
(Canada) Marie-Ève Couture
(Belgium) Marine Dinant
Linesmen:
(Italy) Anna Callovini
(Sweden) Wilma Westlund

Manns (Zielinski) – 41:25	1–0
Georgi (Boico, Seyrer) – 41:46	2–0
	2–1	44:39 – Christensen (Ranum, Bergmann) (PP)

6 min
Penalties
2 min
35
Shots
19

13 January 2026; 16:30	Japan	12–0 (2–0, 3–0, 7–0)	Norway	Ritten Arena; Attendance: 225

Game reference

Kotoha Suzuki
Goalies
Tuva Are-Ekström
Shiva Nobari
Referees:
(United States) Charlotte Hurley
(Sweden) Sabina Küller
Linesmen:
(Czech Republic) Eliška Bublíková
(Denmark) Cassandra Repstock-Romme

Hayakawa (Ito, Sasaki) – 14:53	1–0
Tada (Numabe, Terauchi) (PP) – 16:47	2–0
Numabe – 25:42	3–0
Kagaya (Tada, Numabe) (PP) – 28:23	4–0
Numabe (Odaira, Terauchi) (PP) – 37:10	5–0
Kakuta – 41:25	6–0
Fukuzawa (Maeda, Baba) – 41:38	7–0
Terauchi (Odaira, Numabe) – 42:48	8–0
Yamaguchi – 44:17	9–0
Kakuta (Akimoto, Ito) (PP) – 50:02	10–0
Yamaguchi – 52:27	11–0
Okamura (Ruike, Baba) (PP) – 55:57	12–0

2 min
Penalties
14 min
38
Shots
16

13 January 2026; 20:00	Italy	1–3 (1–2, 0–1, 0–0)	France	Ritten Arena; Attendance: 382

Game reference

Lucrezia La Sala
Goalies
Lysa Nogaretto
Referees:
(Germany) Vanessa Anselm
(Switzerland) Mariko Dale
Linesmen:
(Canada) Joanie Duchesneau
(Norway) Maren Frøhaug

	0–1	06:35 – Boudin (Moussier, Demessine) (PP)
	0–2	11:44 – Demessine (Boudin, Roussel)
Bedont (Dalle Mulle) – 15:48	1–2
	1–3	21:14 – Boudin (Raigneau, Moussier) (PP2)

16 min
Penalties
8 min
18
Shots
27

15 January 2026; 13:00	Japan	5–1 (2–1, 0–0, 3–0)	France	Ritten Arena; Attendance: 115

Game reference

Kotoha Suzuki
Goalies
Lysa Nogaretto
Referees:
(Switzerland) Mariko Dale
(Finland) Kaisa Ketonen
Linesmen:
(Italy) Anna Callovini
(Norway) Maren Frøhaug

Akimoto (Odaira) – 00:10	1–0
Terauchi (Odaira, Akimoto) – 08:04	2–0
	2–1	13:50 – Boudin (Denis)
Odaira (Kagaya) – 40:32	3–1
Kagaya (Odaira, Terauchi) – 49:24	4–1
Yamaguchi (Kakuta) – 54:59	5–1

4 min
Penalties
6 min
42
Shots
16

15 January 2026; 16:30	Denmark	4–3 GWS (2–2, 1–0, 0–1) (OT: 0–0) (SO: 1–0)	Norway	Ritten Arena; Attendance: 155

Game reference

Anja Poulsen
Goalies
Tuva Are-Ekström
Referees:
(Germany) Vanessa Anselm
(Canada) Marie-Ève Couture
Linesmen:
(Czech Republic) Eliška Bublíková
(Canada) Joanie Duchesneau

	0–1	05:04 – Knardahl (Sandvik)
Ekberg (Olesen, Bergmann) – 13:55	1–1
Bergmann (Ma. Petersen, Christensen) – 16:58	2–1
	2–2	19:51 – M. Are-Ekström (Østeraas, Elvira)
Pouls (Ekberg, Bergmann) – 37:15	3–2
	3–3	55:32 – Knardahl (M. Are-Ekström, Nagel)

Bergmann
Ekberg (miss)
Ranum (miss)
Christensen
Shootout
(miss) Malm Larneng
(miss) Knardahl
(miss) Østeraas
(miss) Ellinor Myhre
6 min
Penalties
8 min
30
Shots
32

15 January 2026; 20:00	Italy	1–5 (0–2, 0–1, 1–2)	Germany	Ritten Arena; Attendance: 367

Game reference

Caterina Bolech
Goalies
Tara Bach
Referees:
(United States) Charlotte Hurley
(Sweden) Sabina Küller
Linesmen:
(Austria) Anja Klemm
(Sweden) Wilma Westlund

	0–1	00:16 – Boico
	0–2	05:27 – Poindl (Heine)
	0–3	38:08 – Boico (Poindl)
	0–4	43:57 – Poindl (Annika Stephainski)
Todesco (De Bortoli, Bedont) (PP) – 53:54	1–4
	1–5	56:24 – Stephainski (Birka) (PP)

4 min
Penalties
8 min
13
Shots
37

17 January 2026; 13:00	Norway	4–3 (1–0, 1–3, 2–0)	France	Ritten Arena; Attendance: 113

Game reference

Shiva Nobari
Goalies
Lysa Nogaretto
Referees:
(Canada) Marie-Ève Couture
(Switzerland) Mariko Dale
Linesmen:
(Italy) Anna Callovini
(Denmark) Cassandra Repstock-Romme

Klomstad (Sawyer) – 06:24	1–0
	1–1	27:34 – Boudin (PP)
	1–2	33:44 – Sadoun
Nagel (Sawyer, Klomstad) (PP) – 35:29	2–2
	2–3	38:27 – Boudin (Roussel, Bened)
M. Are-Ekström (Knardahl) – 52:37	3–3
Malm Larneng (Sawyer, Nagel) – 55:18	4–3

6 min
Penalties
6 min
26
Shots
26

17 January 2026; 16:30	Germany	2–1 (1–1, 1–0, 0–0)	Japan	Ritten Arena; Attendance: 209

Game reference

Tara Bach
Goalies
Kotoha Suzuki
Referees:
(United States) Charlotte Hurley
(Finland) Kaisa Ketonen
Linesmen:
(Canada) Joanie Duchesneau
(Austria) Anja Klemm

	0–1	03:32 – Ito (Shida, Sasaki)
Poindl (Boico, Spagert) – 19:13	1–1
Zielinski – 36:27	2–1

4 min
Penalties
4 min
26
Shots
19

17 January 2026; 20:00	Italy	3–6 (1–0, 1–2, 1–4)	Denmark	Ritten Arena; Attendance: 421

Game reference

Lucrezia La Sala
Goalies
Anja Poulsen
Referees:
(Belgium) Marine Dinant
(Sweden) Sabina Küller
Linesmen:
(Czech Republic) Eliška Bublíková
(Norway) Maren Frøhaug

Bedont (Pisetta) – 10:16	1–0
	1–1	24:26 – Christensen (Ma. Petersen)
	1–2	36:54 – Christensen (Navas) (PP)
De Bortoli (Pinti, Todesco) – 38:13	2–2
	2–3	42:12 – Ranum (Christensen, Bergmann)
	2–4	48:46 – Christensen (Bergmann) (PP)
De Bortoli (Franci) – 51:55	3–4
	3–5	57:33 – Olesen (Ekberg)
	3–6	59:25 – Ekberg (Jensen) (EN)

6 min
Penalties
2 min
25
Shots
24

18 January 2026; 13:00	Germany	2–0 (0–0, 0–0, 2–0)	Norway	Ritten Arena; Attendance: 187

Game reference
Tara Bach	Goalies	Tuva Are-Ekström	Referees: (Finland) Kaisa Ketonen (Sweden) Sabina Küller; Linesmen: (Italy) Anna Callovini (Sweden) Wilma Westlund
Seyrer (Nagle) – 52:48 / 1–0; Manns (Heine) (EN) – 58:46 / 2–0			Referees: (Finland) Kaisa Ketonen (Sweden) Sabina Küller; Linesmen: (Italy) Anna Callovini (Sweden) Wilma Westlund
6 min	Penalties	4 min	Referees: (Finland) Kaisa Ketonen (Sweden) Sabina Küller; Linesmen: (Italy) Anna Callovini (Sweden) Wilma Westlund
29	Shots	21	Referees: (Finland) Kaisa Ketonen (Sweden) Sabina Küller; Linesmen: (Italy) Anna Callovini (Sweden) Wilma Westlund

18 January 2026; 16:30	France	4–1 (1–0, 1–1, 2–0)	Denmark	Ritten Arena; Attendance: 167

Game reference
4 min	Penalties	4 min
29	Shots	29

18 January 2026; 20:00	Japan	10–1 (0–0, 8–1, 2–0)	Italy	Ritten Arena; Attendance: 465

Game reference
2 min	Penalties	10 min
41	Shots	8

=== Statistics ===
==== Scoring leaders ====
List shows the top skaters sorted by points, then goals.

Rank	Player	GP	G	A	Pts	+/−	PIM	POS
1	(France) Clémence Boudin	5	8	3	11	+3	2	F
2	(Japan) Azumi Numabe	4	6	4	10	+6	0	F
3	(Japan) Reina Kakuta	5	5	4	9	+11	0	F
4	(Japan) Umeka Odaira	5	2	7	9	+8	2	F
5	(Denmark) Teresa Christensen	5	5	3	8	−1	4	F
6	(Denmark) Nikita Bergmann	5	2	5	7	−3	4	F
6	(Japan) Kika Terauchi	5	2	5	7	+8	2	D
8	(Japan) Momona Fukuzawa	5	4	2	6	+3	0	F
9	(Germany) Alexandra Boico	5	3	2	5	+6	4	F
9	(Italy) Olivia De Bortoli	5	3	2	5	+2	2	F

GP = Games played; G = Goals; A = Assists; Pts = Points; +/− = Plus/minus; PIM = Penalties in minutes; POS = Position
Source: IIHF

==== Leading goaltenders ====
Only the top five goaltenders, based on save percentage, who have played at least 40% of their team's minutes, are included in this list.

Rank	Player	TOI	GA	GAA	SA	Sv%	SO
1	(Germany) Tara Bach	303:40	5	0.99	96	94.79	1
2	(Japan) Kotoha Suzuki	219:30	4	1.09	66	93.94	1
3	(France) Lysa Nogaretto	242:32	11	2.72	129	91.47	0
4	(Denmark) Anja Poulsen	182:32	8	2.63	92	91.30	0
5	(Norway) Tuva Are-Ekström	223:24	11	2.95	97	88.66	0

TOI = Time on ice (minutes:seconds): SA = Shots against; GA = Goals against; GAA = Goals against average; Sv% = Save percentage; SO = Shutouts
Source: IIHF

=== Awards ===
- Best players selected by the directorate:
  - Best Goaltender: (Germany) Tara Bach
  - Best Defender: (Japan) Kika Terauchi
  - Best Forward: (France) Clemence Boudiin

Source: IIHF

== Group B tournament ==
2026 IIHF U18 Women's World Championship Division I B

Tournament details
- Host country: Poland
- City: Katowice
- Venue: 1 (in 1 host city)
- Dates: 5–11 January 2026
- Teams: 6

Tournament statistics
- Games played: 15
- Goals scored: 101 (6.73 per game)
- Attendance: 2,732 (182 per game)
- Scoring leader: (Poland) Małgorzata Zakrzewska (14 points)

Official website
- www.iihf.com

The Division I Group B tournament was played in Katowice, Poland, from 5 to 11 January 2026.

=== Participating teams ===
Team	Qualification
Austria	placed 6th in Division I A last year and were relegated
Poland	hosts; placed 2nd in Division I B last year
Spain	placed 3rd in Division I B last year
China	placed 4th in Division I B last year
Australia	placed 5th in Division I B last year
Great Britain	placed 1st in Division II A last year and were promoted

=== Standings ===
Pos	Team	Pld	W	OTW	OTL	L	GF	GA	GD	Pts	Promotion or relegation
1	China	5	4	1	0	0	30	6	+24	14	Promotion to the 2027 Division I A
2	Poland (H)	5	3	1	1	0	27	11	+16	12	
3	Austria	5	3	0	1	1	27	7	+20	10	
4	Great Britain	5	2	0	0	3	9	13	−4	6	
5	Spain	5	1	0	0	4	5	23	−18	3	
6	Australia	5	0	0	0	5	3	41	−38	0	Relegation to the 2027 Division II A

Source: IIHF
Rules for classification: 1) points; 2) head-to-head points; 3) head-to-head goal difference; 4) head-to-head number of goals scored; 5) result against closest best-ranked team outside tied teams; 6) result against second-best ranked team outside tied teams; 7) seeding before tournament.
(H) Host

=== Match results ===
All times are local (Central European Time; UTC+1).

5 January 2026; 13:00	Great Britain	0–4 (0–0, 0–2, 0–2)	Austria	Jantor Arena, Katowice; Attendance: 69

Game reference
6 min	Penalties	4 min
13	Shots	42

5 January 2026; 16:30	China	4–3 GWS (3–1, 0–1, 0–1) (0–0, 1–0)	Poland	Jantor Arena, Katowice; Attendance: 416

Game reference
2 min	Penalties	2 min
27	Shots	34

5 January 2026; 20:00	Australia	1–4 (1–0, 0–3, 0–1)	Spain	Jantor Arena, Katowice; Attendance: 79

Game reference
2 min	Penalties	6 min
23	Shots	29

6 January 2026; 13:00	Austria	2–4 (0–1, 2–1, 0–2)	China	Jantor Arena, Katowice; Attendance: 70

Game reference
8 min	Penalties	4 min
31	Shots	13

6 January 2026; 16:30	Poland	12–1 (5–1, 3–0, 4–0)	Australia	Jantor Arena, Katowice; Attendance: 538

Game reference
8 min	Penalties	14 min
57	Shots	14

6 January 2026; 20:00	Spain	0–1 (0–1, 0–0, 0–0)	Great Britain	Jantor Arena, Katowice; Attendance: 78

Game reference
0 min	Penalties	10 min
41	Shots	23

8 January 2026; 13:00	Austria	11–0 (6–0, 1–0, 4–0)	Australia	Jantor Arena, Katowice; Attendance: 59

Game reference
2 min	Penalties	10 min
62	Shots	15

8 January 2026; 16:30	Poland	5–1 (2–0, 2–1, 1–0)	Spain	Jantor Arena, Katowice; Attendance: 315

Game reference
2 min	Penalties	2 min
59	Shots	21

8 January 2026; 20:00	Great Britain	1–4 (0–0, 1–2, 0–2)	China	Jantor Arena, Katowice; Attendance: 76

Game reference
4 min	Penalties	0 min
7	Shots	42

10 January 2026; 13:00	China	10–0 (3–0, 4–0, 3–0)	Australia	Jantor Arena, Katowice; Attendance: 75

Game reference
2 min	Penalties	8 min
53	Shots	8

10 January 2026; 16:30	Poland	4–3 (0–0, 3–1, 1–2)	Great Britain	Jantor Arena, Katowice; Attendance: 450

Game reference
2 min	Penalties	2 min
46	Shots	20

10 January 2026; 20:00	Spain	0–8 (0–2, 0–1, 0–5)	Austria	Jantor Arena, Katowice; Attendance: 35

Game reference
8 min	Penalties	4 min
15	Shots	46

11 January 2026; 13:00	Australia	1–4 (1–1, 0–1, 0–2)	Great Britain	Jantor Arena, Katowice; Attendance: 87

Game reference
6 min	Penalties	4 min
15	Shots	25

11 January 2026; 16:30	Spain	0–8 (0–1, 0–5, 0–2)	China	Jantor Arena, Katowice; Attendance: 70

Game reference
16 min	Penalties	4 min
11	Shots	38

11 January 2026; 20:00	Austria	2–3 OT (0–2, 1–0, 1–0) (OT:0–1)	Poland	Jantor Arena, Katowice; Attendance: 315

Game reference
4 min	Penalties	4 min
30	Shots	24

=== Statistics ===
==== Scoring leaders ====
List shows the top skaters sorted by points, then goals.

Rank	Player	GP	G	A	Pts	+/−	PIM	POS
1	(Poland) Małgorzata Zakrzewska	5	11	3	14	+16	2	F
2	(Austria) Emma Lintner	5	9	3	12	+8	4	F
3	(China) Zhang Luoyi	5	6	6	12	+10	0	F
4	(Poland) Agata Cybulska	5	4	8	12	+17	0	F
5	(Austria) Florentina Rumpl	5	6	2	8	+6	0	F
6	(China) Dai Mi	5	4	4	8	+10	2	F
7	(China) Chen Yutong	5	3	5	8	+10	0	F
7	(Austria) Johanna Sintschnig	5	3	5	8	+8	2	F
7	(Poland) Matylda Stepien	5	3	5	8	+12	2	F
10	(Austria) Vanessa Picka	5	4	3	7	+4	2	F

GP = Games played; G = Goals; A = Assists; Pts = Points; +/− = Plus/minus; PIM = Penalties in minutes; POS = Position
Source: IIHF

==== Leading goaltenders ====
Only the top five goaltenders, based on save percentage, who have played at least 40% of their team's minutes, are included in this list.

Rank	Player	TOI	GA	GAA	SA	Sv%	SO
1	(China) Ju Sihan	265:00	6	1.36	87	93.10	0
2	(United Kingdom) Evelyn Brown	299:54	13	2.60	186	93.01	1
3	(Austria) Lara Reisinger	123:50	3	1.45	39	92.31	1
4	(Poland) Justyna Koszyk	308:50	10	1.94	111	90.99	0
5	(Spain) Ana Toural	166:05	9	3.25	78	88.46	0

TOI = Time on ice (minutes:seconds); SA = Shots against; GA = Goals against; GAA = Goals against average; Sv% = Save percentage; SO = Shutouts
Source: IIHF

=== Awards ===
- Best players selected by the directorate:
  - Best Goaltender: (United Kingdom) Evelyn Brown
  - Best Defender: (Austria) Artemis Tekin
  - Best Forward: (Poland) Małgorzata Zakrzewska

Source: IIHF
