= 2026 IIHF U18 Women's World Championship Division II =

International youth ice hockey tournament

Tournament details
- Host countries: Turkey; South Africa
- Venues: 2 (in 2 host cities)
- Dates: 19–25 January 2026; 26 January – 1 February 2026
- Teams: 12

The 2026 IIHF U18 Women's World Championship Division II consists of two international under-18 women's ice hockey tournaments organized by the International Ice Hockey Federation (IIHF). Division II A represents the fourth tier and Division II B the fifth tier of the IIHF U18 Women's World Championship.

== Group A tournament ==
2026 IIHF U18 Women's World Championship Division II A

Tournament details
- Host country: Turkey
- City: Istanbul
- Venue: 1 (in 1 host city)
- Dates: 19–25 January 2026
- Teams: 6

Tournament statistics
- Games played: 15
- Goals scored: 93 (6.2 per game)
- Attendance: 11,463 (764 per game)
- Scoring leader: (Kazakhstan) Sofiya Muravyeva (21 points)

Official website
- www.iihf.com

The Division II Group A tournament was played in Istanbul, Turkey, from 19 to 25 January 2026.

=== Participating teams ===
Team	Qualification
South Korea	Placed 6th in Division I B last year and were relegated
Kazakhstan	Placed 2nd in Division II A last year
Latvia	Placed 3rd in Division II A last year
Netherlands	Placed 4th in Division II A last year
New Zealand	Placed 5th in Division II A last year
Turkey	Hosts; placed 1st in Division II B last year and were promoted

=== Final standings ===
Pos	Team	Pld	W	OTW	OTL	L	GF	GA	GD	Pts	Promotion or relegation
1	South Korea	5	4	1	0	0	25	3	+22	14	Promoted to the 2027 Division I B
2	Kazakhstan	5	4	0	0	1	35	9	+26	12	
3	Latvia	5	2	0	1	2	12	19	−7	7	
4	Netherlands	5	2	0	0	3	10	16	−6	6 (Note: Turkey 0–3 Netherlands)	
5	Turkey (H)	5	2	0	0	3	8	12	−4	6	
6	New Zealand	5	0	0	0	5	3	34	−31	0	Relegated to the 2027 Division II B

Source: IIHF
Rules for classification: 1) points; 2) head-to-head points; 3) head-to-head goal difference; 4) head-to-head number of goals scored; 5) result against closest best-ranked team outside tied teams; 6) result against second-best ranked team outside tied teams; 7) seeding before tournament.
(H) Host

=== Match results ===
All times are local (Turkey Time – UTC+3).

19 January 2026; 13:00	Latvia	2–3 GWS (1–1, 0–0, 1–1) (OT: 0–0) (SO: 0–1)	South Korea	Zeytinburnu Ice Rink, Istanbul; Attendance: 134

Game reference
6 min	Penalties	8 min
17	Shots	37

19 January 2026; 16:30	Kazakhstan	13–2 (3–0, 3–0, 7–2)	New Zealand	Zeytinburnu Ice Rink, Istanbul; Attendance: 52

Game reference
4 min	Penalties	4 min
45	Shots	23

19 January 2026; 20:00	Turkey	0–3 (0–1, 0–2, 0–0)	Netherlands	Zeytinburnu Ice Rink, Istanbul; Attendance: 1,205

Game reference
10 min	Penalties	19 min
33	Shots	10

20 January 2026; 13:00	Kazakhstan	9–1 (2–1, 2–0, 5–0)	Latvia	Zeytinburnu Ice Rink, Istanbul; Attendance: 247

Game reference
12 min	Penalties	10 min
37	Shots	18

20 January 2026; 16:30	South Korea	5–0 (1–0, 4–0, 0–0)	Netherlands	Zeytinburnu Ice Rink, Istanbul; Attendance: 256

Game reference
14 min	Penalties	10 min
53	Shots	10

20 January 2026; 20:00	New Zealand	1–3 (1–1, 0–2, 0–0)	Turkey	Zeytinburnu Ice Rink, Istanbul; Attendance: 1,369

Game reference
14 min	Penalties	6 min
11	Shots	24

22 January 2026; 13:00	Latvia	4–3 (3–1, 0–2, 1–0)	Netherlands	Zeytinburnu Ice Rink, Istanbul; Attendance: 261

Game reference
6 min	Penalties	14 min
39	Shots	14

22 January 2026; 16:30	South Korea	10–0 (1–0, 4–0, 5–0)	New Zealand	Zeytinburnu Ice Rink, Istanbul; Attendance: 279

Game reference
8 min	Penalties	12 min
58	Shots	3

22 January 2026; 20:00	Kazakhstan	5–1 (0–0, 3–1, 2–0)	Turkey	Zeytinburnu Ice Rink, Istanbul; Attendance: 2,013

Game reference
4 min	Penalties	8 min
26	Shots	15

23 January 2026; 13:00	New Zealand	0–4 (0–1, 0–2, 0–1)	Latvia	Zeytinburnu Ice Rink, Istanbul; Attendance: 352

Game reference
8 min	Penalties	8 min
11	Shots	32

23 January 2026; 16:30	Netherlands	0–7 (0–4, 0–2, 0–1)	Kazakhstan	Zeytinburnu Ice Rink, Istanbul; Attendance: 68

Game reference
8 min	Penalties	2 min
18	Shots	39

23 January 2026; 20:00	Turkey	0–2 (0–1, 0–1, 0–0)	South Korea	Zeytinburnu Ice Rink, Istanbul; Attendance: 2,025

Game reference
12 min	Penalties	14 min
17	Shots	23

25 January 2026; 13:00	Netherlands	4–0 (0–0, 2–0, 2–0)	New Zealand	Zeytinburnu Ice Rink, Istanbul; Attendance: 95

Game reference
12 min	Penalties	10 min
30	Shots	21

25 January 2026; 16:30	South Korea	5–1 (0–0, 0–1, 5–0)	Kazakhstan	Zeytinburnu Ice Rink, Istanbul; Attendance: 1,207

Game reference
12 min	Penalties	14 min
32	Shots	14

25 January 2026; 20:00	Latvia	1–4 (1–1, 0–2, 0–1)	Turkey	Zeytinburnu Ice Rink, Istanbul; Attendance: 1,900

Game reference
10 min	Penalties	12 min
22	Shots	27

=== Statistics ===
==== Scoring leaders ====
List shows the top skaters sorted by points, then goals.

Rank	Player	GP	G	A	Pts	+/−	PIM	POS
1	(Kazakhstan) Sofiya Muravyeva	5	10	11	21	+16	4	F
2	(Kazakhstan) Sofiya Zubkova	5	7	9	16	+16	6	F
3	(Kazakhstan) Anfissa Novikova	5	7	4	11	+9	0	F
4	(South Korea) Choi Ji-won	5	2	8	10	+6	6	D
5	(South Korea) Jang Hyeon-seo	5	5	4	9	+7	4	F
6	(Kazakhstan) Renata Livshits	5	4	5	9	+11	4	F
7	(Kazakhstan) Vassilisa Shuklina	5	3	5	8	+7	2	F
7	(Latvia) Kjara Paula Želubovska	5	3	5	8	+3	4	F
9	(South Korea) Yang Tae-yi	5	2	5	7	+12	0	D
10	(Netherlands) Basma Dihni	5	4	2	6	+1	2	F

GP = Games played; G = Goals; A = Assists; Pts = Points; +/− = Plus/minus; PIM = Penalties in minutes; POS = Position
Source: IIHF

==== Leading goaltenders ====
Only the top five goaltenders, based on save percentage, who have played at least 40% of their team's minutes, are included in this list.

Rank	Player	TOI	GA	GAA	SA	Sv%	SO
1	(South Korea) Kim Min-seo	219:53	3	0.82	51	94.12	1
2	(Netherlands) Felien van der Sluis	209:39	8	2.29	125	93.60	2
3	(Kazakhstan) Mariya Yakovleva	300:00	9	1.80	106	91.51	1
4	(Latvia) Megija Kaže	163:03	9	3.31	72	87.50	0
5	(Turkey) Beray Okut	299:24	12	2.40	92	86.96	0

TOI = Time on ice (minutes:seconds); SA = Shots against; GA = Goals against; GAA = Goals against average; Sv% = Save percentage; SO = Shutouts
Source: IIHF

==== Awards ====
- Best players selected by the directorate:
  - Best Goaltender: (South Korea) Kim Min-seo
  - Best Defender: (Turkey) Tan Göksal
  - Best Forward: (Kazakhstan) Sofiya Muravyeva

Source: IIHF.com

== Group B tournament ==
2026 IIHF U18 Women's World Championship Division II Group B

Tournament details
- Host country: South Africa
- City: Cape Town
- Venue: 1 (in 1 host city)
- Dates: 26 January – 1 February 2026
- Teams: 6

Tournament statistics
- Games played: 15
- Goals scored: 143 (9.53 per game)
- Attendance: 1,950 (130 per game)
- Scoring leader: (Romania) Orsolya Fehér (16 points)

Official website
- www.iihf.com

The Division II Group B tournament was played in Cape Town, South Africa, from 26 January to 1 February 2026.

=== Participating teams ===
Team	Qualification
Chinese Taipei	Placed 6th in Division II A last year and were relegated
Iceland	Placed 2nd in Division II B last year
Belgium	Placed 3rd in Division II B last year
Mexico	Placed 4th in Division II B last year
South Africa	Hosts; placed 5th in Division II B last year
Romania	Placed 1st in Division III last year and were promoted

=== Standings ===
Pos	Team	Pld	W	OTW	OTL	L	GF	GA	GD	Pts	Promotion
1	Romania	5	4	0	0	1	47	3	+44	12	Promotion to the 2027 Division II A
2	Iceland	5	2	1	1	1	35	14	+21	9 (Note: Iceland 5 Pts, Chinese Taipei 3 Pts, Mexico 1 Pt.)	
3	Chinese Taipei	5	2	1	1	1	21	14	+7	9	
4	Mexico	5	2	1	1	1	20	10	+10	9	
5	Belgium	5	1	1	1	2	19	14	+5	6	
6	South Africa (H)	5	0	0	0	5	1	88	−87	0	

Source: IIHF
Rules for classification: 1) points; 2) head-to-head points; 3) head-to-head goal difference; 4) head-to-head number of goals scored; 5) result against closest best-ranked team outside tied teams; 6) result against second-best ranked team outside tied teams; 7) seeding before tournament.
(H) Host

=== Match results ===
All times are local (South Africa Time – UTC+2)

26 January 2026; 13:00	Belgium	2–4 (0–1, 0–2, 2–1)	Chinese Taipei	Cape Town Ice Station; Attendance: 100

Game reference
2 min	Penalties	8 min
10	Shots	31

26 January 2026; 16:30	Romania	1–2 (0–1, 1–0, 0–1)	Mexico	Cape Town Ice Station; Attendance: 120

Game reference
4 min	Penalties	12 min
32	Shots	16

26 January 2026; 20:00	Iceland	21–0 (6–0, 8–0, 7–0)	South Africa	Cape Town Ice Station; Attendance: 200

Game reference
0 min	Penalties	0 min
86	Shots	5

27 January 2026; 13:00	Chinese Taipei	3–2 OT (1–2, 0–0, 1–0) (OT: 1–0)	Mexico	Cape Town Ice Station

Game reference
6 min	Penalties	10 min
40	Shots	13

27 January 2026; 16:30	Iceland	3–4 GWS (2–2, 0–0, 1–1) (OT: 0–0) (SO: 0–1)	Belgium	Cape Town Ice Station; Attendance: 70

Game reference
8 min	Penalties	4 min
38	Shots	15

27 January 2026; 20:00	South Africa	0–30 (0–10, 0–10, 0–10)	Romania	Cape Town Ice Station; Attendance: 200

Game reference
2 min	Penalties	2 min
1	Shots	102

29 January 2026; 13:00	Belgium	0–1 GWS (0–0, 0–0, 0–0) (OT: 0–0) (SO: 0–1)	Mexico	Cape Town Ice Station; Attendance: 60

Game reference
2 min	Penalties	4 min
30	Shots	30

29 January 2026; 16:30	Iceland	1–5 (1–0, 0–1, 0–4)	Romania	Cape Town Ice Station; Attendance: 100

Game reference
8 min	Penalties	4 min
15	Shots	25

29 January 2026; 20:00	Chinese Taipei	10–0 (2–0, 5–0, 3–0)	South Africa	Cape Town Ice Station; Attendance: 200

Game reference
4 min	Penalties	10 min
92	Shots	2

30 January 2026; 13:00	Mexico	1–5 (1–0, 0–4, 0–1)	Iceland	Cape Town Ice Station; Attendance: 70

Game reference
10 min	Penalties	0 min
20	Shots	35

30 January 2026; 16:30	Romania	5–0 (1–0, 2–0, 2–0)	Chinese Taipei	Cape Town Ice Station; Attendance: 120

Game reference
8 min	Penalties	8 min
34	Shots	19

30 January 2026; 20:00	South Africa	0–13 (0–5, 0–3, 0–5)	Belgium	Cape Town Ice Station; Attendance: 280

Game reference
8 min	Penalties	2 min
2	Shots	56

1 February 2026; 13:00	Belgium	0–6 (0–3, 0–2, 0–1)	Romania	Cape Town Ice Station; Attendance: 70

Game reference
10 min	Penalties	0 min
16	Shots	45

1 February 2026; 16:30	Chinese Taipei	4–5 OT (2–1, 1–2, 1–1) (OT: 0–1)	Iceland	Cape Town Ice Station; Attendance: 180

Game reference
4 min	Penalties	6 min
29	Shots	23

1 February 2026; 20:00	Mexico	14–1 (6–0, 3–1, 5–0)	South Africa	Cape Town Ice Station; Attendance: 180

Game reference
0 min	Penalties	4 min
60	Shots	3

=== Awards and Statistics ===
==== Scoring leaders ====
List shows the top skaters sorted by points, then goals.

Rank	Player	GP	G	A	Pts	+/−	PIM	POS
1	(Romania) Orsolya Fehér	5	8	8	16	+13	2	F
2	(Iceland) Sólrún Arnardóttir	5	3	12	15	+13	0	F
3	(Iceland) Friðrika Magnúsdóttir	5	6	8	14	+12	0	F
4	(Iceland) Kolbrún Björnsdóttir	5	7	6	13	+12	6	F
4	(Romania) Olivia Popescu	5	7	6	13	+10	2	D
6	(Belgium) Linnore Saunders	5	5	5	10	+5	4	F
7	(Romania) Rania Gyorffy	5	1	9	10	+11	0	D
8	(Romania) Eva Zlate	5	6	3	9	+15	0	F
9	(Romania) Boglárka Antal	5	5	4	9	+11	0	F
10	(Iceland) Kristina Davíðsdóttir	5	5	3	8	+3	0	F

GP = Games played; G = Goals; A = Assists; Pts = Points; +/− = Plus/minus; PIM = Penalties in minutes; POS = Position
Source: IIHF

==== Leading goaltenders ====
Only the top five goaltenders, based on save percentage, who have played at least 40% of their team's minutes, are included in this list.

Rank	Player	TOI	GA	GAA	SA	Sv%	SO
1	(Romania) Nicoleta Șabalin	180:00	1	0.33	35	97.14	2
2	(Mexico) Sofia Hernández	266:43	9	2.02	137	93.43	1
3	(Belgium) Eurydice Blairon	250:00	13	3.12	143	90.91	1
4	(Iceland) Diana Óskarsdóttir	198:36	9	2.72	67	86.57	0
5	(Chinese Taipei) Chen Pin-Jie	123:59	8	3.87	51	81.16	0

TOI = Time on ice (minutes:seconds); SA = Shots against; GA = Goals against; GAA = Goals against average; Sv% = Save percentage; SO = Shutouts
Source: IIHF

==== Awards ====
- Best players selected by the directorate:
  - Best Goaltender: (Romania) Nicoleta Șabalin
  - Best Defender: (Chinese Taipei) Hsieh Shu-Yu
  - Best Forward: (Iceland) Sólrún Arnardóttir

Source: IIHF.com
