= Clémence Boudin =

French ice hockey player (born 2008)

- Born: 1 June 2008 (age 18) Sallanches, Haute-Savoie, France
- Height: 1.63 m (5 ft 4 in)
- Weight: 59 kg (130 lb; 9 st 4 lb)
- Position: Forward
- Shoots: Left
- Current team: Pôle France Féminin
- National team: France
- Playing career: 2023–present

Clémence Boudin (born 1 June 2008) is a French ice hockey player who plays as a forward. She has represented France internationally at both junior and senior levels, including in the women's ice hockey tournament at the 2026 Winter Olympics.

== Playing career ==
Boudin discovered ice hockey during primary school and later joined the Pôle France Féminin national development programme in Cergy. She has been part of France's national development pathway through the Pôle France Féminin programme since 2023. In November 2025, Équipe de France reported that she scored her first goal with the senior national team on 7 November 2025.

== International play ==
At the under-18 level, Boudin competed for France in the Division I Group A tournaments of the IIHF U18 Women's World Championship in 2024, 2025, and 2026. In 2026, she led the tournament in both goals (8) and points (11) and was selected as the Best Forward of the tournament by the directorate.

Boudin was selected for France's Olympic roster and appeared in four games at the 2026 Winter Olympics.

== Personal life ==
Boudin was born on 1 June 2008 in Sallanches, France. She grew up in Passy in the Haute-Savoie department.

== Career statistics ==
=== International ===
Year	Team	Event	Result	GP	G	A	Pts	PIM
2023	France	U18 (Div I-A)	3rd	5	0	0	0	4
2024	France	YOG	5th	2	0	0	0	3
2024	France	U18 (Div I-A)	5th	5	1	1	2	2
2025	France	U18 (Div I-A)	5th	5	0	2	2	6
2026	France	U18 (Div I-A)	3rd	5	8	3	11	2
2026	France	OG	10th	4	0	0	0	0
U18 totals				20	9	6	15	14
