= Radim Raděvič =

Czech ice hockey player (1966–2026)

Personal information
- Nationality: Czech
- Born: 16 December 1966 Opava, Czechoslovakia
- Died: 5 September 2026 (aged 59)

Sport
- Sport: Ice hockey

Radim Raděvič (16 December 1966 – 5 September 2026) was a Czech ice hockey player. He competed in the men's tournament at the 1988 Winter Olympics. Raděvič died on 5 September 2026, at the age of 59.

== Career statistics ==
=== Regular season and playoffs ===
			Regular season					Playoffs
Season	Team	League	GP	G	A	Pts	PIM	GP	G	A	Pts	PIM
1983–84	TJ Slezan STS Opava	CZE.2		3				—	—	—	—	—
1984–85	TJ Gottwaldov	TCH	7	3	0	3	8	—	—	—	—	—
1985–86	TJ Slezan STS Opava	CZE.2		2				—	—	—	—	—
1985–86	TJ Gottwaldov	TCH	27	10	5	15		5	1	2	3
1986–87	ASVŠ Dukla Trenčín	TCH	34	4	3	7	14	—	—	—	—	—
1987–88	ASVŠ Dukla Trenčín	TCH	44	17	32	49		—	—	—	—	—
1988–89	TJ Gottwaldov	TCH	31	10	10	20	2	—	—	—	—	—
1989–90	TJ Zlín	TCH	43	17	21	38		—	—	—	—	—
1990–91	AC ZPS Zlín	TCH	26	8	10	18	8	—	—	—	—	—
1991–92	TuS Geretsried	GER.3	30	40	44	84	23	14	15	17	32	20
1992–93	AC ZPS Zlín	TCH	36	12	17	29		9	3	9	12
1993–94	TJ Zbrojovka Vsetín	CZE.2		24	34	58		—	—	—	—	—
1994–95	HC Dadák Vsetín	ELH	6	0	3	3	4	—	—	—	—	—
1994–95	HC Olomouc	ELH	14	1	7	8	6	—	—	—	—	—
1994–95	HC Kometa Brno	CZE.2	9	0	4	4	0	—	—	—	—	—
1995–96	HC Slezan Opava	CZE.2	28	8	5	13		—	—	—	—	—
1996–97	HC Bohemex Trade Opava	ELH	20	1	9	10	8	—	—	—	—	—
1996–97	Heilbronner EC	GER.2	3	2	3	5	0	—	—	—	—	—
1997–98	EHC Klostersee	GER.3	6	1	5	6	4	—	—	—	—	—
1997–98	HC Přerov	CZE.2	6	0	1	1		—	—	—	—	—
1998–99	EV Zeltweg	AUT.2
1999–2000	HC Uherské Hradiště	CZE.3	13	0	3	3	0	—	—	—	—	—
1999–2000	HC Strakonice	CZE.3	15	4	15	19	24	—	—	—	—	—
2000–01	HC Uničov	CZE.3	22	4	13	17	18	—	—	—	—	—
2000–01	Dinslakener EV	GER.4	6	3	8	11	2	—	—	—	—	—
2004–05	HC Uherský Brod	CZE.4	3	1				5	2
TCH totals			248	81	98	179	—	14	4	11	15	—

=== International ===
Year	Team	Event	GP	G	A	Pts	PIM
1988	Czechoslovakia	OG	2	0	1	1	0
Senior totals			2	0	1	1	0

"Radim Radevic". Elite Prospects.
