= Péter Bikár =

Hungarian ice hockey player (1945–2026)

- Born: 5 November 1945 Budapest, Hungary
- Died: 1 May 2026 (aged 80)
- Height: 6 ft 0 in (183 cm)
- Weight: 159 lb (72 kg; 11 st 5 lb)
- Position: Centre
- Played for: Fehérvári Titánok; Ferencvárosi TC; Budapesti Vasutas SC
- National team: Hungary
- Playing career: 1961–1980

Péter Bikár (5 November 1945 – 1 May 2026) was a Hungarian ice hockey player. He played for the Hungarian national team at the 1964 Winter Olympics and several World Championships. Bikár died on 1 May 2026, at the age of 80.
