= 2017 IIHF Women's Challenge Cup of Asia =

Tournament details
- Host country: Thailand
- Venue: 1 (in 1 host city)
- Dates: 7–15 March 2017
- Teams: 7

Final positions
- Champions: New Zealand U18 (1st title)
- Runners-up: Thailand
- Third place: Singapore
- Fourth place: India

Tournament statistics
- Games played: 21
- Goals scored: 236 (11.24 per game)
- Scoring leader: (Thailand) Nuchanat Ponglerkdee

Awards
- MVP: Tsewang Chuskit

The 2017 IIHF Women's Challenge Cup of Asia is an international women's ice hockey tournament run by the International Ice Hockey Federation. The tournament took place from 7 to 15 March 2017 at the Rink Ice Arena of the CentralPlaza Grand Rama IX in Bangkok, Thailand. A round robin format was used. It was the fifth edition held since its formation in 2010 under the IIHF Challenge Cup of Asia series of tournament.

The Philippines made their international debut in this tournament while India recorded their first international win against the former in this edition. New Zealand sent their under-18 national team.

== Round robin ==
Team	Pld	W	OTW	OTL	L	GF	GA	GD	Pts
New Zealand U18	6	6	0	0	0	57	9	+48	18
Thailand	6	5	0	0	1	83	9	+74	15
Singapore	6	4	0	0	2	38	18	+20	12
India	6	2	0	0	4	16	52	−36	6
Philippines	6	2	0	0	4	12	42	−30	6
United Arab Emirates	6	1	0	1	4	16	61	−45	4
Malaysia	6	0	1	0	5	14	45	−31	2

Source: IIHF

=== Fixtures ===
All times are local. (ICT – UTC+7)

7 March 2017; 13:00	New Zealand U18	6–2 (2–0, 2–1, 2–1)	Singapore	The Rink Ice Arena

Game reference

7 March 2017; 16:30	United Arab Emirates	4–5 (2–1, 1–1, 1–2, 0–1)	Malaysia	The Rink Ice Arena

Game reference

7 March 2017; 19:00	Thailand	21–1 (4–0, 8–0, 9–1)	Philippines	The Rink Ice Arena

Game reference

8 March 2017; 13:00	India	4–6 (1–2, 1–2, 2–2)	United Arab Emirates	The Rink Ice Arena

Game reference

8 March 2017; 16:30	Singapore	6–2 (4–0, 1–1, 1–1)	Philippines	The Rink Ice Arena

Game reference

8 March 2017; 20:00	Malaysia	2–13 (1–4, 0–5, 1–4)	New Zealand U18	The Rink Ice Arena

Game reference

9 March 2017; 13:00	India	4–3 (0–0, 1–0, 3–3)	Philippines	The Rink Ice Arena

Game reference

9 March 2017; 16:30	Singapore	16–2 (4–1, 6–0, 6–1)	United Arab Emirates	The Rink Ice Arena

Game reference

9 March 2017; 20:00	Thailand	3–4 (1–0, 1–2, 1–2)	New Zealand U18	The Rink Ice Arena

Game reference

11 March 2017; 13:00	Philippines	3–1 (2–1, 0–0, 1–0)	Malaysia	The Rink Ice Arena

Game reference

11 March 2017; 16:30	New Zealand U18	10–1 (3–0, 6–0, 1–1)	India	The Rink Ice Arena

Game reference

11 March 2017; 20:00	United Arab Emirates	1–17 (0–6, 0–4, 1–7)	Thailand	The Rink Ice Arena

Game reference

12 March 2017; 13:00	New Zealand U18	8–0 (3–0, 1–0, 4–0)	Philippines	The Rink Ice Arena

Game reference

12 March 2017; 16:30	Singapore	4–1 (3–0, 0–0, 1–1)	Malaysia	The Rink Ice Arena

Game reference

12 March 2017; 20:00	Thailand	20–1 (5–0, 10–0, 5–1)	India	The Rink Ice Arena

Game reference

14 March 2017; 13:00	Philippines	3–2 (2–1, 1–1, 0–0)	United Arab Emirates	The Rink Ice Arena

Game reference

14 March 2017; 16:30	India	1–9 (1–3, 0–4, 0–2)	Singapore	The Rink Ice Arena

Game reference

14 March 2017; 20:00	Malaysia	1–16 (0–3, 0–6, 1–7)	Thailand	The Rink Ice Arena

Game reference

15 March 2017; 13:00	United Arab Emirates	1–16 (0–5, 1–6, 0–5)	New Zealand U18	The Rink Ice Arena

Game reference

15 March 2017; 16:30	Malaysia	4–5 (2–3, 1–1, 1–1)	India	The Rink Ice Arena

Game reference

15 March 2017; 20:00	Thailand	6–1 (2–0, 1–0, 3–1)	Singapore	The Rink Ice Arena

Game reference

== Awards and statistics ==
=== Awards ===
==== Best Players Selected by the Directorate ====
- Best Goalkeeper Maria Jessica Cabili
- Best Defenceman Mei Wah Wan
- Best Forward Wen Lin Lim

Source: IIHF.com

==== Best Players of Each Team Selected by Coaches ====
- India Diskit Chhonzom Angmo
- Malaysia Su Ying Karen Chong
- New Zealand U18 Jana Kivell
- Philippines Maria Jessica Cabili
- Singapore Jill Quek
- Thailand Sirikarn Jittresin
- United Arab Emirates Mariam Almazrouei

Source: IIHF.com

=== Scoring leaders ===
Player	GP	G	A	Pts	+/–	PIM	POS
(Thailand) Nuchanat Ponglerkdee	6	27	18	45	+50	4	F
(Thailand) Minsasha Teekhathanasakul	6	13	16	29	+48	4	F
(Thailand) Sirikarn Jittresin	6	11	13	24	+54	8	D
(Thailand) Kritsana Promdirat	6	7	16	23	+50	2	D
(New Zealand) Beth Scott	6	17	2	19	+18	0	F
(New Zealand) Laura Thresher	6	12	6	18	+18	4	F
(New Zealand) Jana Kivell	6	8	8	16	+23	4	F
(Singapore) Jaslyn Lim	6	11	5	16	+10	6	F
(Singapore) Jill Quek	6	5	8	13	+8	2	F
(Singapore) Wen Lin Lim	6	8	4	12	+7	4	F

Source: IIHF.com

=== Goaltending leaders ===
Only the top five goaltenders, based on save percentage, who have played at least 40% of their team's minutes, are included in this list.

Player	TOI	GA	GAA	SA	SV%	SO
(New Zealand) Daisy Hopkins	248:38	7	1.69	65	90.28	0
(Thailand) Wasunun Angkulpattanasuk	200:00	6	1.80	52	89.66	0
(Thailand) Wichaya Phangnga	160:00	3	1.13	23	88.46	0
(Singapore) Caroline Ang	277:15	13	2.81	80	86.02	0
(Philippines) Maria Jessica Cabili	265:30	28	6.33	162	85.26	0

Source: IIHF.com
