= 2026 IIHF World U18 Championship Division I =

2026 IIHF U18 World Championship Division I
Tournament details
- Host countries: Poland; Estonia
- Venues: 2 (in 2 host cities)
- Dates: 18–24 April 2026 (A); 25 April – 1 May 2026 (B)
- Teams: 12

The 2026 IIHF U18 World Championship Division I consists of two international under-18 ice hockey tournaments organized by the International Ice Hockey Federation. Divisions I A and I B represent the second and the third tier of the IIHF World U18 Championship.

== Division I A ==
2026 IIHF U18 World Championship Division I A

Tournament details
- Host country: Poland
- City: Krynica-Zdrój
- Venue: 1 (in 1 host city)
- Dates: 18–24 April 2026
- Teams: 6

Tournament statistics
- Games played: 15
- Goals scored: 117 (7.8 per game)
- Attendance: 3,448 (230 per game)
- Scoring leader: (Switzerland) Fabrice Bouvard (10 points)

Official website
- www.iihf.com

The Division I Group A tournament was played in Krynica-Zdrój, Poland, from 18 to 24 April 2025.

=== Participating teams ===
Team	Qualification
Switzerland	Placed 10th in Top Division last year and were relegated
Ukraine	Placed 2nd in Division I A last year
Kazakhstan	Placed 3rd in Division I A last year
Slovenia	Placed 4th in Division I A last year
Hungary	Placed 5th in Division I A last year
Poland	Hosts; Placed 1st in Division I B last year and were promoted

=== Match officials ===
Seven referees and seven linesperson were selected for the tournament.

Referees	Linesperson
(France) Nicolas Cregut; (Poland) Bartosz Kaczmarek; (United States) Chazz Knoche; (Finland) Eetu Rasalahti; (Austria) Jacob Schauer; (Canada) Tyler Skene; (Germany) Marius Wölzmüller	(Switzerland) Fabrizio Bachelut; (Canada) Maxime Bedard; (Sweden) Philip Hanning; (United Kingdom) Ilia Kisil; (Poland) Piotr Kot; (United States) Odin Nelson; (Ukraine) Oleh Ostroukh

=== Standings ===
Pos	Team	Pld	W	OTW	OTL	L	GF	GA	GD	Pts	Promotion or relegation
1	Switzerland	5	4	1	0	0	30	11	+19	14	
2	Kazakhstan	5	3	1	0	1	25	12	+13	11	
3	Ukraine	5	2	0	1	2	22	22	0	7	
4	Hungary	5	2	0	0	3	16	19	−3	6	
5	Slovenia	5	1	0	1	3	14	23	−9	4	
6	Poland (H)	5	1	0	0	4	10	30	−20	3	Relegated to the 2027 Division I B

Source: IIHF
Rules for classification: 1) points; 2) head-to-head points; 3) head-to-head goal difference; 4) head-to-head number of goals scored; 5) result against closest best-ranked team outside tied teams; 6) result against second-best ranked team outside tied teams; 7) seeding before tournament.
(H) Host

=== Match results ===
All times are local (Central European Summer Time; UTC+2).

18 April 2026; 12:30	Hungary	2–5 (0–2, 2–1, 0–2)	Kazakhstan	Krynica Ice Stadium; Attendance: 100

Game reference
Benedek Gyulai	Goalies	Kirill Mylnikov	Referees: (France) Nicolas Cregut (Austria) Jakob Schauer; Linesmen: (Switzerland) Fabrizio Bachelut (Poland) Piotr Kot
6 min	Penalties	8 min	Referees: (France) Nicolas Cregut (Austria) Jakob Schauer; Linesmen: (Switzerland) Fabrizio Bachelut (Poland) Piotr Kot
26	Shots	26	Referees: (France) Nicolas Cregut (Austria) Jakob Schauer; Linesmen: (Switzerland) Fabrizio Bachelut (Poland) Piotr Kot

18 April 2026; 16:00	Slovenia	2–4 (1–2, 1–0, 0–2)	Ukraine	Krynica Ice Stadium; Attendance: 156

Game reference
Jon Kavčič	Goalies	Illia Bobrov	Referees: (Poland) Bartosz Kaczmarek (Germany) Marius Wölzmüller; Linesmen: (Sweden) Philip Hanning (United Kingdom) Ilia Kisil
10 min	Penalties	4 min	Referees: (Poland) Bartosz Kaczmarek (Germany) Marius Wölzmüller; Linesmen: (Sweden) Philip Hanning (United Kingdom) Ilia Kisil
29	Shots	30	Referees: (Poland) Bartosz Kaczmarek (Germany) Marius Wölzmüller; Linesmen: (Sweden) Philip Hanning (United Kingdom) Ilia Kisil

18 April 2026; 19:30	Poland	1–6 (0–1, 0–1, 1–4)	Switzerland	Krynica Ice Stadium; Attendance: 645

Game reference
Kacper Rydzoń	Goalies	Yannis Zambelli	Referees: (United States) Chazz Knoche (Finland) Eetu Rasalahti; Linesmen: (Canada) Maxime Bedard (United States) Odin Nelson
4 min	Penalties	8 min	Referees: (United States) Chazz Knoche (Finland) Eetu Rasalahti; Linesmen: (Canada) Maxime Bedard (United States) Odin Nelson
13	Shots	66	Referees: (United States) Chazz Knoche (Finland) Eetu Rasalahti; Linesmen: (Canada) Maxime Bedard (United States) Odin Nelson

19 April 2026; 12:30	Ukraine	4–6 (2–4, 1–2, 1–0)	Hungary	Krynica Ice Stadium; Attendance: 182

Game reference
4 min	Penalties	10 min
40	Shots	35

19 April 2026; 16:00	Switzerland	10–2 (5–0, 1–1, 4–1)	Slovenia	Krynica Ice Stadium; Attendance: 114

Game reference
8 min	Penalties	6 min
43	Shots	29

19 April 2026; 19:30	Kazakhstan	10–2 (2–1, 1–1, 7–0)	Poland	Krynica Ice Stadium; Attendance: 412

Game reference
8 min	Penalties	6 min
46	Shots	20

21 April 2026; 12:30	Switzerland	5–1 (0–0, 3–1, 2–0)	Hungary	Krynica Ice Stadium; Attendance: 85

Game reference
33 min	Penalties	6 min
24	Shots	31

21 April 2026; 16:00	Ukraine	3–5 (2–0, 1–2, 0–3)	Kazakhstan	Krynica Ice Stadium; Attendance: 118

Game reference
6 min	Penalties	16 min
34	Shots	24

21 April 2026; 19:30	Poland	4–3 (0–0, 2–1, 2–2)	Slovenia	Krynica Ice Stadium; Attendance: 337

Game reference
8 min	Penalties	16 min
41	Shots	27

23 April 2026; 12:30	Kazakhstan	2–3 (1–3, 0–0, 1–0)	Switzerland	Krynica Ice Stadium; Attendance: 150

Game reference
8 min	Penalties	14 min
22	Shots	31

23 April 2026; 16:00	Slovenia	5–2 (3–1, 2–1, 0–0)	Hungary	Krynica Ice Stadium; Attendance: 133

Game reference
10 min	Penalties	10 min
27	Shots	38

23 April 2026; 19:30	Ukraine	6–3 (1–1, 0–1, 5–1)	Poland	Krynica Ice Stadium; Attendance: 361

Game reference
10 min	Penalties	6 min
43	Shots	29

24 April 2026; 12:30	Kazakhstan	3–2 GWS (0–0, 0–2, 2–0); OT: (0–0); SO: (1–0)	Slovenia	Krynica Ice Stadium; Attendance: 55

Game reference
8 min	Penalties	8 min
43	Shots	16

24 April 2026; 16:00	Switzerland	6–5 OT (2–0, 1–2, 2–3); OT: (1–0)	Ukraine	Krynica Ice Stadium; Attendance: 155

Game reference
8 min	Penalties	4 min
22	Shots	41

24 April 2026; 19:30	Hungary	5–0 (0–0, 2–0, 3–0)	Poland	Krynica Ice Stadium; Attendance: 445

Game reference
8 min	Penalties	12 min
41	Shots	16

Source: Match Schedule

== Division I B ==
2026 IIHF U18 World Championship Division I B

Tournament details
- Host country: Estonia
- City: Tallinn
- Venue: 1 (in 1 host city)
- Dates: 25 April – 1 May 2026
- Teams: 6

Tournament statistics
- Games played: 15
- Goals scored: 82 (5.47 per game)
- Attendance: 7,158 (477 per game)
- Scoring leader: (Lithuania) Deimantas Šulinskas (9 points)

Official website
- www.iihf.com

The Division I Group B tournament was being played in Tallinn, Estonia, from 25 April to 1 May 2026.

=== Participating teams ===
Team	Qualification
Austria	Placed 6th in 2025 Division I A and were relegated
Lithuania	Placed 2nd in Division I B last year
South Korea	Placed 3rd in Division I B last year
France	Placed 4th in Division I B last year
Estonia	Hosts; Placed 5th in Division I B last year
Italy	Placed 1st in Division II A last year and were promoted

=== Match officials ===
Seven referees and seven linesperson were selected for the tournament.

Referees	Linesperson
(Switzerland) Michael Fritschi; (Czech Republic) Tomáš Hacaperka; (Japan) Go Hashimoto; (Sweden) David Laksola; (United States) Hunter Mottinger; (Estonia) Mark Punger; (Hungary) Dániel Soós	(Kazakhstan) Nurlan Alpyspayev; (Italy) Paolo Brondi; (Canada) Maxime Ferland; (Sweden) William Henriksson; (Finland) Daniel Lindblom; (Latvia) Toms Mencis; (France) Thomas Simon

=== Standings ===
Pos	Team	Pld	W	OTW	OTL	L	GF	GA	GD	Pts	Promotion or relegation
1	Austria	5	3	1	0	1	20	12	+8	11	
2	Lithuania	5	3	0	1	1	14	12	+2	10 (Note: France 2–3 Lithuania)	
3	France	5	3	0	1	1	15	9	+6	10	
4	Estonia (H)	5	1	1	0	3	14	19	−5	5 (Note: Estonia 3–1 Italy)	
5	Italy	5	1	1	0	3	9	13	−4	5	
6	South Korea	5	1	0	1	3	10	17	−7	4	Relegation to the 2027 Division II A

Source: IIHF
Rules for classification: 1) points; 2) head-to-head points; 3) head-to-head goal difference; 4) head-to-head number of goals scored; 5) result against closest best-ranked team outside tied teams; 6) result against second-best ranked team outside tied teams; 7) seeding before tournament.
(H) Host

=== Match results ===
All times are local (Eastern European Summer Time; UTC+3).

25 April 2026; 12:30	Italy	1–4 (0–2, 1–1, 0–1)	Austria	Tondiraba Ice Hall; Attendance: 120

Game reference
8 min	Penalties	6 min
17	Shots	24

25 April 2026; 16:00	France	2–3 (2–0, 0–0, 0–3)	Lithuania	Tondiraba Ice Hall; Attendance: 210

Game reference
10 min	Penalties	6 min
32	Shots	18

25 April 2026; 19:30	Estonia	2–4 (0–0, 1–2, 1–2)	South Korea	Tondiraba Ice Hall; Attendance: 1,250

Game reference
8 min	Penalties	8 min
28	Shots	22

26 April 2026; 12:30	Austria	1–3 (0–0, 0–0, 1–3)	France	Tondiraba Ice Hall; Attendance: 125

Game reference
8 min	Penalties	14 min
22	Shots	36

26 April 2026; 16:00	Lithuania	5–2 (4–1, 0–0, 1–1)	Estonia	Tondiraba Ice Hall; Attendance: 985

Game reference
12 min	Penalties	31 min
29	Shots	22

26 April 2026; 19:30	South Korea	0–4 (0–3, 0–1, 0–0)	Italy	Tondiraba Ice Hall; Attendance: 95

Game reference
6 min	Penalties	4 min
8	Shots	36

28 April 2026; 12:30	Lithuania	3–1 (1–0, 0–1, 2–0)	South Korea	Tondiraba Ice Hall; Attendance: 185

Game reference
10 min	Penalties	8 min
26	Shots	24

28 April 2026; 16:00	Italy	0–4 (0–0, 0–2, 0–2)	France	Tondiraba Ice Hall; Attendance: 175

Game reference
8 min	Penalties	6 min
14	Shots	35

28 April 2026; 19:30	Austria	7–4 (3–3, 2–1, 2–0)	Estonia	Tondiraba Ice Hall; Attendance: 1,005

Game reference
6 min	Penalties	6 min
25	Shots	21

30 April 2026; 12:30	Lithuania	2–3 GWS (0–1, 1–1, 1–0); OT: (0–0); SO: (0–1)	Italy	Tondiraba Ice Hall; Attendance: 210

Game reference
4 min	Penalties	12 min
23	Shots	21

30 April 2026; 16:00	South Korea	3–4 OT (0–1, 1–0, 2–2); OT: (0–1)	Austria	Tondiraba Ice Hall; Attendance: 153

Game reference
6 min	Penalties	12 min
13	Shots	42

30 April 2026; 19:30	France	2–3 GWS (1–1, 1–0, 0–1); OT: (0–0); SO: (0–1)	Estonia	Tondiraba Ice Hall; Attendance: 955

Game reference
16 min	Penalties	6 min
39	Shots	26

1 May 2026; 12:30	Austria	4–1 (2–1, 1–0, 1–0)	Lithuania	Tondiraba Ice Hall; Attendance: 235

Game reference
8 min	Penalties	10 min
29	Shots	26

1 May 2026; 16:00	South Korea	2–4 (1–1, 1–0, 0–3)	France	Tondiraba Ice Hall; Attendance: 185

Game reference
4 min	Penalties	6 min
22	Shots	47

1 May 2026; 19:30	Estonia	3–1 (1–1, 1–0, 1–0)	Italy	Tondiraba Ice Hall; Attendance: 1,270

Game reference
28 min	Penalties	14 min
23	Shots	14

Source: Match Schedule
