= 2026 IIHF U18 Women's World Championship Division III =

International youth ice hockey tournament

Tournament details
- Host country: Thailand
- City: Bangkok
- Venue: 1 (in 1 host city)
- Dates: 29 January – 4 February 2026 (Cancelled)
- Teams: 5

The 2026 IIHF U18 Women's World Championship Division III was a planned international under-18 women's ice hockey tournament organized by the International Ice Hockey Federation (IIHF). It would have been played in Bangkok, Thailand, from 29 January to 4 February 2026. Division III represents the sixth tier of the IIHF U18 Women's World Championship.

The tournament was cancelled on 21 January 2026, citing "unforeseen circumstances, which made it impossible to stage the tournament as planned."

== Participating teams ==
Team	Qualification
Thailand	Hosts; placed 2nd in Division III last year
Croatia	Placed 3rd in Division III last year
Lithuania	Placed 4th in Division III last year
Bulgaria	The team sat out last year's World Championship
Iran	First participation in World Championship

== Standings ==
Pos	Team	Pld	W	OTW	OTL	L	GF	GA	GD	Pts
1	Thailand (H)	0	0	0	0	0	0	0	0	0
2	Croatia	0	0	0	0	0	0	0	0	0
3	Lithuania	0	0	0	0	0	0	0	0	0
4	Bulgaria	0	0	0	0	0	0	0	0	0
5	Iran	0	0	0	0	0	0	0	0	0

Source: IIHF
Rules for classification: 1) points; 2) head-to-head points; 3) head-to-head goal difference; 4) head-to-head number of goals scored; 5) result against closest best-ranked team outside tied teams; 6) result against second-best ranked team outside tied teams; 7) seeding before tournament.
(H) Host

== Match schedule ==
All times are local (Thailand Time – UTC+7)

29 January 2026; 14:30	Croatia	Cancelled	Iran	Thailand International Ice Hockey Arena

29 January 2026; 18:30	Lithuania	Cancelled	Thailand	Thailand International Ice Hockey Arena

30 January 2026; 14:30	Croatia	Cancelled	Lithuania	Thailand International Ice Hockey Arena

30 January 2026; 18:30	Thailand	Cancelled	Bulgaria	Thailand International Ice Hockey Arena

1 February 2026; 14:30	Lithuania	Cancelled	Bulgaria	Thailand International Ice Hockey Arena

1 February 2026; 18:30	Thailand	Cancelled	Iran	Thailand International Ice Hockey Arena

2 February 2026; 14:30	Iran	Cancelled	Lithuania	Thailand International Ice Hockey Arena

2 February 2026; 18:30	Bulgaria	Cancelled	Croatia	Thailand International Ice Hockey Arena

4 February 2026; 14:30	Bulgaria	Cancelled	Iran	Thailand International Ice Hockey Arena

4 February 2026; 18:30	Thailand	Cancelled	Croatia	Thailand International Ice Hockey Arena

Source: Match schedule
