= Nana Akimoto =

Japanese ice hockey player (born 1995)

- Born: April 8, 2009 (age 17) Nagano, Japan
- Height: 159 cm (5 ft 3 in)
- Weight: 50 kg (110 lb; 7 st 12 lb)
- Position: Defense
- National team: Japan
- Playing career: 2024–present

Nana Akimoto (born April 8, 2009) is a Japanese ice hockey player. She is a member of the Japanese women's national ice hockey team that participated in women's ice hockey tournament at the 2026 Winter Olympics.

== Playing career ==
=== International play ===
Making her Olympic debut on February 6, Japan opposed France. Wearing number nine, Akimoto logged 3:31 of ice time.

Akimoto was one of 17 teenagers that played in women's ice hockey at the 2026 Winter Olympics.
