= New Zealand women's national under-18 ice hockey team =

New Zealand
- Association: New Zealand Ice Hockey Federation
- General manager: Philippa Kaisser
- Head coach: Angelique Mawson
- Assistants: Michelle Cox
- Captain: Laney Keenan
- Team colors
- IIHF code: NZL

First international
- New Zealand 2 – 2 Australia (Dunedin, New Zealand; 6 December 2013)

Biggest win
- New Zealand 22 – 0 South Africa (Sofia, Bulgaria; 10 January 2024)

Biggest defeat
- Great Britain 16 – 1 New Zealand (Riga, Latvia; 23 January 2025)

IIHF World Women's U18 Championships
- Appearances: 1 (first in 2020)
- Best result: 28th (2020)

IIHF Women's Challenge Cup of Asia
- Appearances: 3 (first in 2017)
- Best result: 1st (2017)

International record (W–L–T)
- 13–4–1

Medal record

Women's Challenge Cup of Asia
Gold medal – first place	2017 Bangkok	U18 Team
Silver medal – second place	2018 Bangkok	U18 Team

The New Zealand women's national under-18 ice hockey team is the women's national under-18 ice hockey team of New Zealand. The team is controlled by New Zealand Ice Hockey Federation, a member of the International Ice Hockey Federation. The team entered their first World Women's U18 Championship tournaments in 2020.

== History ==
New Zealand played their first game on 6 December 2013 against Australia in Dunedin, tying 2–2. The game was part of a four-game series being held in Dunedin between two teams. New Zealand went on to win the remaining three games of the series, which included their largest recorded international win of 5–1 in the final game. On 30 May and 1 June 2014, New Zealand played two games against the Auckland under-16 representative team, losing both games 9–1 and 4–0 respectively. In December 2014, New Zealand travelled to Australia to compete in a five-game series against Australia at the Medibank Icehouse in Melbourne. The team lost the series two games to three and also recorded their largest international loss in game four, losing 8–1 to Australia.

In March 2017, New Zealand participated in the 2017 IIHF Women's Challenge Cup of Asia. This was New Zealand's first time sending a team to this tournament. The team was undefeated throughout the tournament and gained their biggest win so far 16–1 against the United Arab Emirates. The team was also by far the youngest to compete, with an average age of 16. They defeated the women's (senior) national teams of Asia including Thailand, Singapore, India, Philippines, Malaysia, and the United Arab Emirates.

== International competitions ==
=== World Women's U18 Championship ===
- 2020 IIHF World Women's U18 Championship. Finish: 4th in Division II Group B (28th overall)
- 2023 IIHF World Women's U18 Championship. Finish: 4th in Division II Group B (30th overall)

=== Women's Challenge Cup of Asia ===
- 2017 IIHF Women's Challenge Cup of Asia. Finish: 1st
- 2018 IIHF Women's Challenge Cup of Asia. Finish: 2nd
- 2019 IIHF Women's Challenge Cup of Asia. Finish: 4th

== Players and personnel ==
=== Team roster - 2014 Series with Australia ===
From the 2014 International Series with Australia

Name	Pos	Club
Terryn Bruce	F	Auckland
Gina Davis	F	Auckland
Kirstin Gerken	F	Auckland
Nicola Henare	D	Southern
Daisy Hopkins	G	Canterbury
Alex Hyde	F	Auckland
Lochlyn Hyde	G	Auckland
Laney Keenan	F	Southern
Whitney Keenan	D	Southern
Kyrissa Kolisnyk	F	Auckland
Stephanie Laycock	F	Auckland
Rebecca Lilly	D	Southern
Caitlin Orr	F	Southern
Tessa Rooney-Broadbent	F	Auckland
Millicent Smith	D	Canterbury
Eliza Thompson	D	Canterbury
Phoebe Thompson	D	Canterbury

=== Team officials - 2014 Series with Australia ===
From the 2014 International Series with Australia

- Head coach: Brandon Contratto
- Assistant coach: Alexis Debol
- General Manager: Simon Thompson
- Assistant manager: Jan Kolisnyk

=== Team roster - 2017 IIHF Challenge Cup of Asia ===
From the 2017 IIHF Women's Challenge Cup of Asia

Name	Pos	Club
Samara Campton	F	Auckland
Sophie Harold	D	Auckland
Jana Kivell	F	Auckland
Laura Thresher	F	Auckland
Daisy Hopkins	G	Canterbury
Abbey Heale	F	Canterbury
Brooke Whitman	D	Canterbury
Phoebe Thompson	F	Canterbury
Millicent Smith	D	Canterbury
Heather McAslan	F	Southern
Erin Marshall	F	Southern
Laney Keenan	D	Southern
Rina Watt	F	Southern
Brittany Tiller	F	Southern
Hannah Cross	D	Southern
Beth Scott	F	Southern
Kirstin Gerken	F	Southern
Gabrielle Mills	F	Southern
Ashley Dickinson	G	Southern

=== Team officials - 2017 IIHF Challenge Cup of Asia ===
From the 2017 IIHF Women's Challenge Cup of Asia

- Head coach: Angelique Mawson
- Assistant coach: Geoffroy Boehme
- Assistant coach: Lyndal Heineman
- General Manager: Philippa Kaisser
- Physiotherapist: Suzanne Belcher
- Team Staff: Jonathan Albright

=== Team roster - 2018 IIHF Challenge Cup of Asia ===
Name	Pos	Club
Samara Campton	F	Auckland
Jamie Kaisser	F	Auckland
Jana Kivell	F	Auckland
Lilly Forbes	G	Canterbury
Alyssa Murphy	F	Canterbury
Millicent Smith	D	Canterbury
Ellie Dugdale	D	Canterbury
Brooke Whitman	D	Canterbury
Katelyn Heyrick	F	Canterbury
Phoebe Thompson	F	Canterbury
Heather McAslan	F	Southern
Erin Marshall	F	Southern
Laney Keenan	D	Southern
Rina Watt	F	Southern
Georgia Reynolds	F	Southern
Brittany Tiller	F	Southern
Hannah Cross	D	Southern
Beth Scott	F	Southern
Gabrielle Mills	F	Southern
Ashley Dickinson	G	Southern

=== Team officials - 2018 IIHF Challenge Cup of Asia ===
- Head coach: Angelique Mawson
- Assistant coach: Michelle Cox
- General Manager: Philippa Kaisser
