= Georgian Ice Hockey Federation =

Ice hockey governing body of Georgia

Georgia
- Association name: Georgian Ice Hockey National Federation
- IIHF Code: GEO
- Founded: 2004
- IIHF membership: 8 May 2009
- President: Zakaria Khechuashvili
- IIHF men's ranking: 41st

The Georgian Ice Hockey National Federation (GIHNF; Georgian: საქართველოს ყინულის ჰოკეის ეროვნული ფედერაცია) is the governing body of ice hockey in Georgia. The federation was founded in 2004 by Denis Davidov and Lasha Tsagareishvili. In 2009 Georgia joined the International Ice Hockey Federation (IIHF) as an associate member. The Georgian Ice Hockey League was started in 2007. Shortly after being accepted into the IIHF both Davidov and Tsagareishvili, along with four others (including the president of the Ice Hockey Federation of Armenia) were killed in a car accident, forcing the Georgian Ice Hockey Federation to delay plans to start a national team. Georgia joined the International Ice Hockey Federation (IIHF) on 8 May 2009.

== National teams ==
- Men's national team

=== Participation by year ===
2017

Event	Division	Host nation	Date	Result
Men	Div. III	Bulgaria	10–16 April 2017	3rd place (43rd overall)

2018

Event	Division	Host nation	Date	Result
Men	Div. III	South Africa	16–22 April 2018	1st place (Promoted to 2019 Division IIB) (41st overall)
