= 2017 IIHF World Championship Division III =

International ice hockey tournament

Tournament details
- Host country: Bulgaria
- Venue(s): 1 (in 1 host city)
- Dates: 10–16 April
- Teams: 7

Tournament statistics
- Games played: 15
- Goals scored: 161 (10.73 per game)
- Attendance: 4,800 (320 per game)
- Scoring leader(s): (Georgia (country)) Artem Kozyulin (25 points)

Official website
- IIHF.com

The 2017 IIHF World Championship Division III was an international ice hockey tournament run by the International Ice Hockey Federation. It was contested in Sofia, Bulgaria from 10 to 16 April 2017. Seven teams participated in the tournament, divided into two groups. Bosnia and Herzegovina was originally scheduled to participate, but withdrew before the tournament began; all their games were recorded as 5–0 forfeits for the opposing team. Luxembourg won the tournament, defeating Bulgaria 10–4 in the final, and played in Division IIB in 2018. Chinese Taipei debuted in Division III and, apart from defeating Bosnia and Herzegovina in a forfeit, recorded their first official win, beating the UAE 4–0 in the 5th place playoff.

== Venues ==
Division III
Sofia
Winter Sports Palace
Capacity: 4,600
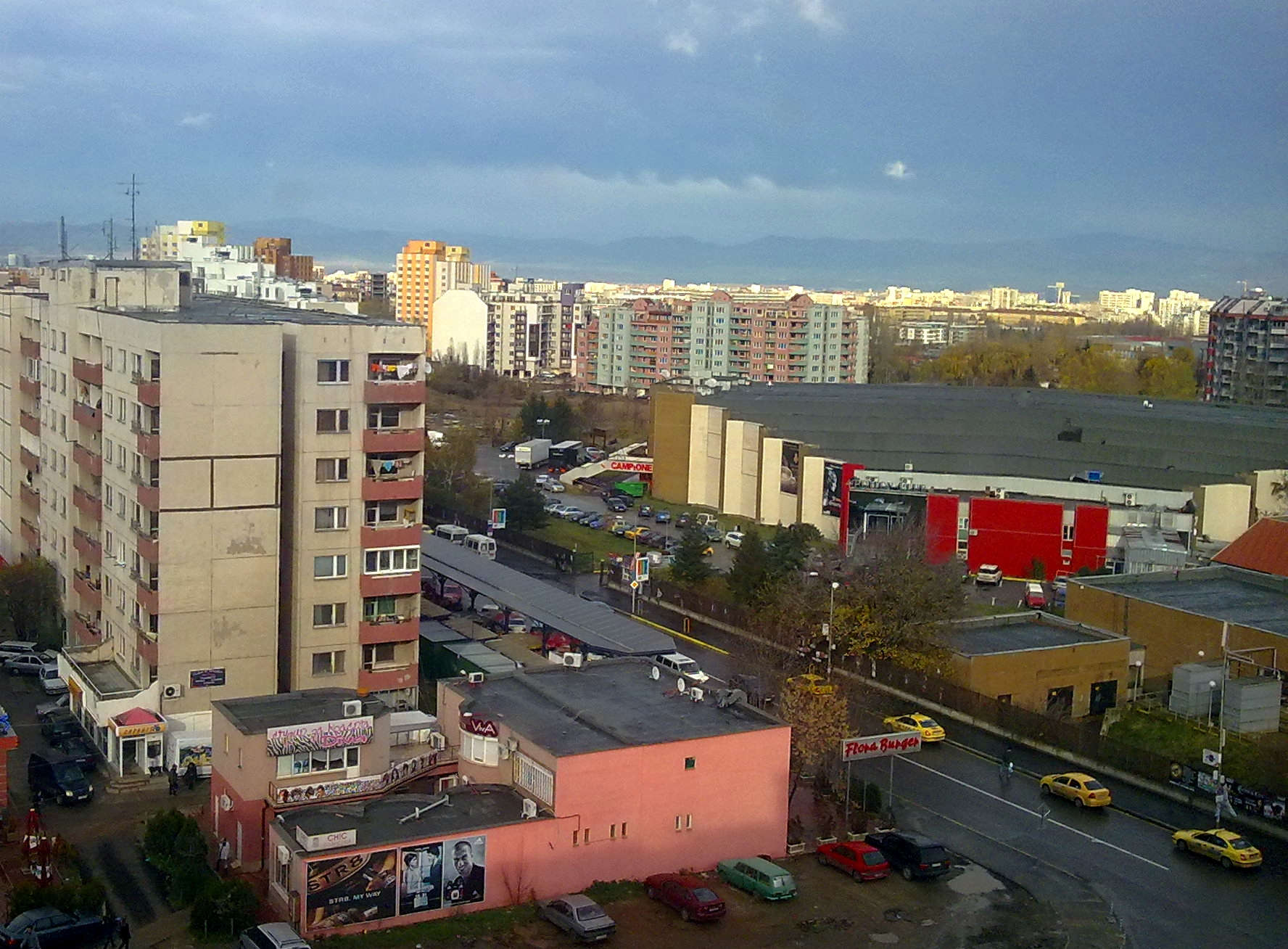

The Bulgarian bid was the only contender for the 2017 IIHF World Championship Division III competition. It will mark the first time that this competition has been held in Bulgaria. In September 2016 the format of the division was realigned into one tournament with two preliminary divisions.

== Participants ==
Team	Qualification
Bulgaria	Host, placed 6th in Division II B last year and were relegated.
South Africa	Placed 2nd in Division III last year.
Luxembourg	Placed 3rd in Division III last year.
~~Bosnia and Herzegovina~~	Placed 4th in Division III last year. (withdrew from tournament)
Hong Kong	Placed 5th in Division III last year.
Georgia	Placed 6th in Division III last year.
United Arab Emirates	Withdrew from tournament last year. Last played in 2015.
Chinese Taipei	First time participating in tournament.

== Match officials ==
5 referees and 9 linesmen were selected for the tournament.

Referees

- (Poland) Michał Baca
- (Slovenia) Miha Bajt
- (Russia) Ivan Fateyev
- (Turkey) Cemal Ersin Kaya
- (South Korea) Kim No-su

Linesmen

- (Turkey) Ferhat Aygün
- (Italy) Christian Cristeli
- (Ukraine) Illya Khokhlov
- (Belarus) Aleh Kliashcheunikau
- (Germany) Jonas Merten
- (Austria) Jakob Schauer
- (Bulgaria) Luchezar Stoyanov
- (Israel) Gil Haim Tichon
- (Poland) Wiktor Zień

== Preliminary round ==
All times are local (UTC+3).

=== Group A ===
Pos	Team	Pld	W	OTW	OTL	L	GF	GA	GD	Pts	Qualification
1	Bulgaria (H)	3	3	0	0	0	18	3	+15	9	Semifinals
2	Hong Kong	3	2	0	0	1	13	12	+1	6	Semifinals
3	Chinese Taipei	3	1	0	0	2	7	8	−1	3	
4	Bosnia and Herzegovina (Note: Bosnia withdrew before the tournament and all games were forfeited and counted as a 5–0 win for the opposing team.)	3	0	0	0	3	0	15	−15	0	Withdrawn

Source: IIHF.com
Rules for classification: 1) points; 2) head-to-head points; 3) head-to-head goal difference; 4) head-to-head number of goals scored; 5) result against closest best-ranked team outside tied teams; 6) result against second-best ranked team outside tied teams; 7) seeding before tournament.
(H) Host
Notes:

10 April 2017; 20:00	Bulgaria	3–0 (0–0, 2–0, 1–0)	Chinese Taipei	Winter Sports Palace, Sofia; Attendance: 950

Game reference

Dimitar Dimitrov
Goalies
Liao Yu-cheng
Huang Sheng-chun
Referee:
(Slovenia) Miha Bajt
Linesmen:
(Turkey) Ferhat Aygün
(Poland) Wiktor Zień

Dikov (Gatchev) – 21:51	1–0
M. Vasilev (Muhachev, Boyadjiev) (PP) – 38:55	2–0
Dikov (Iskrenov) – 54:42	3–0

28 min
Penalties
18 min
55
Shots
7

11 April 2017; 20:00	Hong Kong	3–10 (2–4, 1–2, 0–4)	Bulgaria	Winter Sports Palace, Sofia; Attendance: 800

Game reference

King Ho
Cheung Ching-ho
Goalies
Dimitar Dimitrov
Referee:
(South Korea) Kim No-su
Linesmen:
(Israel) Gil Tichon
(Poland) Wiktor Zień

Au-yeung (Tang) – 02:01	1–0
Au-Yeung (Yeung) (PP) – 08:55	2–0
	2–1	09:20 – Iskrenov (Dikov, V. Vasilev)
	2–2	11:14 – M. Nikolov (Hodulov, Boyadjiev) (PP)
	2–3	16:13 – Dilkov (V. Vasilev (PP)
	2–4	19:08 – Iskrenov (Gatchev, Dikov)
Lau (Sham, Tai) – 26:39	3–4
	3–5	36:05 – Muhachev (Yotov, M. Vasilev)
	3–6	39:29 – Dilkov (Gatchev)
	3–7	42:44 – Yotov (Dikov, M. Vasilev)
	3–8	47:34 – Muhachev (Yotov, M. Vasilev)
	3–9	53:28 – Iskrenov (Mladenov, Dikov)
	3–10	58:13 – Iskrenov (Dikov) (SH)

10 min
Penalties
18 min
13
Shots
84

13 April 2017; 16:30	Chinese Taipei	2–5 (0–3, 1–1, 1–1)	Hong Kong	Winter Sports Palace, Sofia; Attendance: 50

Game reference

Liao Yu-cheng
Huang Sheng-chun
Goalies
King Ho
Referee:
(Turkey) Cemal Kaya
Linesmen:
(Ukraine) Illya Khokhlov
(Belarus) Aleh Kliashcheunikau

	0–1	06:13 – Au-yeung (PP)
	0–2	13:34 – Kan S. (Chau)
	0–3	13:59 – Ngan (Chau)
Yang Hsiao-h. (Chang T., Wei Yu-k.) (PP) – 27:50	1–3
	1–4	31:38 – Kan S. (Leung)
Lin (Pai, Tseng) – 45:03	2–4
	2–5	58:54 – Chau (SH, ENG)

16 min
Penalties
12 min
31
Shots
23

=== Group B ===
Pos	Team	Pld	W	OTW	OTL	L	GF	GA	GD	Pts	Qualification
1	Luxembourg	3	3	0	0	0	26	5	+21	9	Semifinals
2	Georgia	3	2	0	0	1	29	11	+18	6	Semifinals
3	South Africa	3	1	0	0	2	14	9	+5	3	
4	United Arab Emirates	3	0	0	0	3	0	44	−44	0	

Source: IIHF.com
Rules for classification: 1) points; 2) head-to-head points; 3) head-to-head goal difference; 4) head-to-head number of goals scored; 5) result against closest best-ranked team outside tied teams; 6) result against second-best ranked team outside tied teams; 7) seeding before tournament.

10 April 2017; 13:00	Luxembourg	17–0 (4–0, 6–0, 7–0)	United Arab Emirates	Winter Sports Palace, Sofia; Attendance: 50

Game reference

Philippe Lepage
Goalies
Khaled Al Suwaidi
Referee:
(Poland) Michał Baca
Linesmen:
(Belarus) Aleh Kliashcheunikau
(Austria) Jakob Schauer

Welter (Wambach, K. Linster) – 01:15	1–0
Mosr (Houdremont) – 04:07	2–0
K. Linster (Welter, T. Beran) (SH) – 07:01	3–0
Eriksson (R. Beran) – 11:00	4–0
R. Beran (Eriksson, Cannon) – 20:24	5–0
Wambach (Mosr) – 21:03	6–0
Cannon (R. Beran) – 22:48	7–0
R. Beran (Cannon) – 32:56	8–0
Cannon (Houdremont, Mosr) – 33:27	9–0
Houdremont (K.Linster) – 37:31	10–0
Cannon (R. Beran) – 40:15	11–0
Welter (T. Beran) (SH) – 44:41	12–0
Cannon (Eriksson, R. Beran) (PP) – 47:08	13–0
Linster (Houdremont) (PP) – 50:00	14–0
Cannon (Schons, Mossong) – 53:55	15–0
Welter (R. Beran) – 54:06	16–0
B. Linster (Mossong) – 59:20	17–0

12 min
Penalties
12 min
52
Shots
8

10 April 2017; 16:30	South Africa	5–6 (1–1, 1–2, 3–3)	Georgia	Winter Sports Palace, Sofia; Attendance: 100

Game reference

Charl Pretorius
Goalies
Andrei Ilienko
Referee:
(Russia) Ivan Fateev
Linesmen:
(Italy) Christian Cristeli
(Israel) Gil Tichon

	0–1	04:12 – Dumbadze (Kozyulin)
Magmoed (Husselman) (PP) – 05:44	1–1
Valadas – 28:35	2–1
	2–2	33:57 – Dumbadze (Filimonov, Shalunov)
	2–3	36:06 – Shalunov (Kurbatov, Dumbadze) (PP)
	2–4	42:50 – Kurbatov (Jeiranashvili)
	2–5	47:43 – Filimonov (Kurbatov) (PP)
Samaai (Gonsalves) (PP) – 48:35	3–5
	3–6	51:52 – Kurbatov (Dumbadze, Kozyulin) (PP)
Marais) – 52:09	4–6
Giot (Marais) – 55:08	5–6

46 min
Penalties
48 min
34
Shots
19

11 April 2017; 13:00	Luxembourg	6–4 (1–1, 3–1, 2–2)	Georgia	Winter Sports Palace, Sofia; Attendance: 50

Game reference

Philippe Lepage
Goalies
Andrei Ilienko
Referee:
(Turkey) Cemal Kaya
Linesmen:
(Ukraine) Illya Khohlov
(Bulgaria) Luchezar Stoyanov

Schons (Cannon, R. Beran) (PP) – 13:29	1–0
	1–1	19:40 – Kozyulin (Kurbatov) (PP)
Eriksson (R. Beran, Cannon) – 20:31	2–1
R. Beran (Cannon) (PP) – 25:25	3–1
Cannon (R. Beran, Eriksson) – 36:39	4–1
	4–2	37:35 – Shvetsov (PS)
	4–3	42:07 – Shvetsov (Kozyulin)
Welter (R. Beran) (PP) – 57:10	5–3
	5–4	58:13 – Filimonov (Kurbatov, Shvetsov) (EA)
Eriksson (ENG) – 59:09	6–4

22 min
Penalties
48 min
40
Shots
25

11 April 2017; 16:30	United Arab Emirates	0–8 (0–1, 0–4, 0–3)	South Africa	Winter Sports Palace, Sofia; Attendance: 50

Game reference

Ahmed Al-Dhaheri
Goalies
Gary Bock
Referee:
(Poland) Michał Baca
Linesmen:
(Turkey) Ferhat Aygün
(Germany) Jonas Merten

0–1	04:05 – Botha (Bremner)
0–2	26:43 – Compton (Valadas)
0–3	32:48 – Van Doesburgh (Samaai, De Jager)
0–4	33:14 – Samaai (Birrell) (PP)
0–5	38:08 – Magmoed (Birell, Botha) (PP)
0–6	49:05 – De Jager (Edwards, Husselman)
0–7	54:29 – Van Doesburgh (Botha) (SH)
0–8	58:28 – Gonsalves (SH)

14 min
Penalties
30 min
12
Shots
33

13 April 2017; 13:00	Georgia	19–0 (9–0, 2–0, 8–0)	United Arab Emirates	Winter Sports Palace, Sofia; Attendance: 300

Game reference

Andrei Ilienko
Goalies
Khaled Al-Suwaidi
Referee:
(Slovenia) Miha Bajt
Linesmen:
(Germany) Jonas Merten
(Austria) Jakob Schauer

Shvetsov (Kozyulin, Dumbadze) (PP) – 04:13	1–0
Shvetsov (Filimonov) – 04:31	2–0
Shalunov (Oganeziani, Kurbatov) – 07:50	3–0
Oganeziani (Shvetsov) – 08:58	4–0
Kozyulin (Shvetsov, Filimonov) – 11:39	5–0
Filimonov (Shvetsov, Kurbatov) – 13:29	6–0
Kozyulin – 13:39	7–0
Kozyulin (Jeiranashvili) – 15:09	8–0
Shalunov (Kozyulin) – 18:25	9–0
Kurbatov (Shvetsov) (PP) – 20:36	10–0
Dumbadze (Shalunov) – 37:58	11–0
Kozyulin (Shalunov) (SH) – 49:08	12–0
Dumbadze (Kurbatov, Kozyulin) – 49:38	13–0
Kozyulin (Kurbatov, Dumbadze) – 51:24	14–0
Kurbatov (Shvetsov) – 52:57	15–0
Kozyulin (SH) – 54:53	16–0
Kozyulin (Dumbadze) – 57:40	17–0
Kozyulin (Filimonov) – 59:07	18–0
Kurbatov (Dumbadze) – 59:41	19–0

30 min
Penalties
10 min
63
Shots
14

13 April 2017; 20:00	South Africa	1–3 (0–1, 0–0, 1–2)	Luxembourg	Winter Sports Palace, Sofia; Attendance: 250

Game reference

Charl Pretorius
Goalies
Gilles Mangen
Referee:
(South Korea) Kim No-su
Linesmen:
(Italy) Christian Cristeli
(Bulgaria) Luchezar Stoyanov

	0–1	07:04 – Minden (Holtzem)
Valadas (Birrell) – 50:54	1–1
	1–2	56:46 – R. Beran (Cannon, Eriksson)
	1–3	59:11 – Houdremont (Holtzem) (ENG)

8 min
Penalties
18 min
36
Shots
14

== Knockout stage ==
=== Bracket ===
Semifinals
15 April
Luxembourg	8
Hong Kong	1
15 April
Bulgaria	9
Georgia	3

Final
16 April
Luxembourg	10
Bulgaria	4
Third place
16 April
Hong Kong	3
Georgia	14

5th place bracket

5th–7th place semifinals
15 April
Chinese Taipei	4
United Arab Emirates	0

Fifth place
16 April
South Africa	7
Chinese Taipei	3

=== 5th–7th place semifinal ===
15 April 2017; 13:00	Chinese Taipei	4–0 (3–0, 0–0, 1–0)	United Arab Emirates	Winter Sports Palace, Sofia; Attendance: 50

Game reference

Liao Yu-cheng
Goalies
Ahmed Al-Dhaheri
Referee:
(Turkey) Cemal Kaya
Linesmen:
(Turkey) Ferhat Aygün
(Bulgaria) Luchezar Stoyanov

Tseng (Tang Y., Chang Ha.) (PP) – 06:43	1–0
Lin (Shen, Tseng) (PP) – 10:25	2–0
Wei Yu-k. (Yang Hsiao-h.) – 12:32	3–0
Shen (Wei Yu-k.) – 46:17	4–0

14 min
Penalties
8 min
40
Shots
28

=== Semifinals ===
15 April 2017; 16:30	Luxembourg	8–1 (3–0, 2–1, 3–0)	Hong Kong	Winter Sports Palace, Sofia; Attendance: 250

Game reference

Philippe Lepage
Goalies
King Ho
Cheung Ching-ho
Referee:
(Russia) Ivan Fateyev
Linesmen:
(Ukraine) Illya Khokhlov
(Israel) Gil Tichon

K. Linster (R. Beran) – 02:50	1–0
Cannon (R. Beran) – 17:41	2–0
Cannon (B. Linster) – 19:59	3–0
	3–1	20:11 – Au-yeung (Tang, Wong)
Minden (T. Beran, Welter) – 28:19	4–1
Cannon – 29:34	5–1
R. Beran – 48:51	6–1
Wambach – 57:20	7–1
Mosr (Houdremont, Thill) – 58:07	8–1

2 min
Penalties
2 min
52
Shots
13

15 April 2017; 20:00	Bulgaria	9–3 (4–0, 2–1, 3–2)	Georgia	Winter Sports Palace, Sofia; Attendance: 750

Game reference

Dimitar Dimitrov
Goalies
Andrei Ilienko
Referee:
(Poland) Michał Baca
Linesmen:
(Germany) Jonas Merten
(Poland) Wiktor Zień

Iskrenov (Hodulov) – 07:59	1–0
M. Vasilev (Yotov) (PP2) – 11:23	2–0
Nikolov (Hodulov) – 15:19	3–0
Cvetanov (M. Vasilev, Yotov) – 17:29	4–0
	4–1	24:10 – Kozyulin (Shvetsov) (PP2)
Muhachev (Dikov, Boyadjiev) (SH) – 26:38	5–1
T. Georgiev (Muhachev, Yotov) – 37:15	6–1
	6–2	42:32 – Shvetsov (Kurbatov, Kozyulin)
Cvetanov (Yotov, Hodulov) – 44:12	7–2
Iskrenov (Hodulov, Boyadjiev) – 50:16	8–2
Cvetanov (Gyurov, Yotov) (PP2) – 52:36	9–2
	9–3	55:30 – Shvetsov (Kurbatov)

12 min
Penalties
40 min
64
Shots
37

=== Fifth place game ===
16 April 2017; 12:30	South Africa	7–3 (3–2, 3–0, 1–1)	Chinese Taipei	Winter Sports Palace, Sofia; Attendance: 150

Game reference

Gary Bock
Charl Pretorius
Goalies
Liao Yu-cheng
Huang Sheng-chun
Referee:
(South Korea) Kim No-su
Linesmen:
(Austria) Jakob Schauer
(Bulgaria) Luchezar Stoyanov

Willemstijn (Van Doesburgh) – 01:05	1–0
Husselman (Birrell, Gordon) – 05:53	2–0
	2–1	06:54 – Wei Yu-c.
Giot (Edwards) (PP) – 18:11	3–1
	3–2	19:56 – Shen (Yang Hsiao-h., Wei Yu-k.)
Husselman (Giot) – 25:56	4–2
Edwards (Gordon, Husselman) – 31:56	5–2
Botha (Van Doesburgh) – 39:56	6–2
	6–3	43:29 – Tang Y. (Pai) (PP)
Samaai (Edwards, Gordon) – 48:22	7–3

18 min
Penalties
8 min
42
Shots
15

=== Third place game ===
16 April 2017; 16:00	Hong Kong	3–14 (1–6, 1–3, 1–5)	Georgia	Winter Sports Palace, Sofia; Attendance: 50

Game reference

King Ho
Cheung Ching-ho
Goalies
Andrei Ilienko
Kakha Ambrolava
Referee:
(Slovenia) Miha Bajt
Linesmen:
(Italy) Christian Cristeli
(Poland) Wiktor Zień

	0–1	06:13 – Dumbadze (Kozyulin)
	0–2	07:51 – Kozyulin (Dumbadze, Geperidze)
Sham (Tang, Au-yeung) – 08:11	1–2
	1–3	10:26 – Kurbatov (Dumbadze, Filimonov) (PP)
	1–4	15:12 – Shvetsov (Filimonov, Kozyulin) (PP)
	1–5	18:45 – Kozyulin
	1–6	19:40 – Shvetsov (Oganeziani, Filimonov)
Tang (Au-yeung, Sham) (PP) – 25:56	2–6
	2–7	28:28 – Shvetsov (Kurbatov, Filimonov)
	2–8	31:08 – Dumbadze (Kozyulin)
	2–9	32:09 – Oganeziani (Kurbatov, Shvetsov)
	2–10	42:09 – Shvetsov (Filimonov)
	2–11	45:44 – Shvetsov (Kozyulin, Kurbatov) (PP)
	2–12	48:45 – Kozyulin (Kurbatov, Dumbadze)
	2–13	50:47 – Jeiranashvili (Shalunov)
Tang – 53:38	3–13
	3–14	56:41 – Oganeziani (Kozyulin, Shvetsov) (PP)

10 min
Penalties
6 min
24
Shots
43

=== Final ===
16 April 2017; 19:30	Luxembourg	10–4 (3–3, 4–1, 3–0)	Bulgaria	Winter Sports Palace, Sofia; Attendance: 950

Game reference

Philippe Lepage
Goalies
Dimitar Dimitrov
Nikola Nikolov
Referee:
(Russia) Ivan Fateyev
Linesmen:
(Belarus) Aleh Kliashcheunikau
(Germany) Jonas Merten

	0–1	02:15 – M. Vasilev (Muhachev, Yotov)
T. Beran (Welter) – 04:36	1–1
	1–2	09:17 –Yotov (Gyurov, Muhachev) (PP)
	1–3	15:15 – Iskrenov (Hodulov)
Welter (Mosr) – 15:47	2–3
Schons (Scheier, R. Beran) – 18:49	3–3
K. Linster (Eriksson) (PP) – 22:48	4–3
	4–4	29:39 – Yotov (Muhachev) (SH)
Welter (T. Beran) – 31:34	5–4
Mosr – 37:56	6–4
Cannon (R. Beran) (PP2) – 39:53	7–4
Mosr (Schons) (PP2) – 51:06	8–4
T. Beran (Holtzem) – 52:50	9–4
R. Beran (ENG) – 56:34	10–4

12 min
Penalties
34 min
31
Shots
61

== Final ranking ==
Promoted to 2018 IIHF Division II B
Relegation to 2018 IIHF Division III Qualification

Rank	Team
1	Luxembourg (P)
2	Bulgaria (H)
3	Georgia
4	Hong Kong
5	South Africa
6	Chinese Taipei
7	United Arab Emirates (R)

(H) Host; (P) Promoted; (R) Relegated.
Source: IIHF.com

== Awards and statistics ==
=== Awards ===
- Best players selected by the directorate:
  - Best Goaltender: (Chinese Taipei) Liao Yu-cheng
  - Best Defenceman: (Georgia (country)) Artem Kurbatov
  - Best Forward: (Luxembourg) Robert Beran

Source: IIHF.com

=== Scoring leaders ===
Player	GP	G	A	Pts	+/−	PIM	POS
(Georgia (country)) Artem Kozyulin	5	13	12	25	+13	6	F
(Georgia (country)) Ivan Shvetsov	5	11	9	20	+9	2	F
(Georgia (country)) Artem Kurbatov	5	6	14	20	+16	8	D
(Luxembourg) Robert Beran	5	6	13	19	+14	8	F
(Luxembourg) Colm Cannon	5	11	6	17	+14	6	F
(Georgia (country)) Vitali Dumbadze	5	6	9	15	+13	26	F
(Georgia (country)) Grigory Filimonov	5	3	9	12	+6	8	F
(Bulgaria) Alexei Yotov	4	3	8	11	+5	0	F
(Luxembourg) Benny Welter	5	6	3	9	+15	0	F
(Bulgaria) Stanislav Muhachev	4	3	6	9	+4	2	F

GP = Games played; G = Goals; A = Assists; Pts = Points; +/− = Plus/minus; PIM = Penalties in minutes; POS = Position
Source: IIHF.com

=== Goaltending leaders ===
Only the top five goaltenders, based on save percentage, who have played at least 40% of their team's minutes, are included in this list.

Player	TOI	GA	GAA	SA	Sv%	SO
(Luxembourg) Philippe Lepage	240:00	9	2.25	107	91.59	1
(Chinese Taipei) Liao Yu-cheng	169:59	9	3.18	103	91.26	1
(Georgia (country)) Andrei Ilienko	287:28	21	4.38	169	87.57	1
(Hong Kong) King Ho	168:16	23	8.20	150	84.67	0
(United Arab Emirates) Ahmed Al-Dhaheri	120:00	12	6.00	73	83.56	0

TOI = Time on ice (minutes:seconds); SA = Shots against; GA = Goals against; GAA = Goals against average; Sv% = Save percentage; SO = Shutouts
Source: IIHF.com
