= 2017 Men's Ice Hockey World Championships =

2017 edition of the Men's World Ice Hockey Championships

The 2017 Men's Ice Hockey World Championships was the 81st such event hosted by the International Ice Hockey Federation. Teams participated at several levels of competition. The competition also served as qualifications for division placements in the 2018 competition.

== Championship (Top Division) ==
The tournament was held in Cologne, Germany and Paris, France from 5 to 21 May 2017.

Pos	Grp	Team	Pld	W	OTW	OTL	L	GF	GA	GD	Pts	Final result
1	A	Sweden	10	7	1	1	1	38	16	+22	24	Champions
2	B	Canada	10	8	0	2	0	39	15	+24	26	Runners-up
3	A	Russia	10	7	1	0	2	45	17	+28	23	Third place
4	B	Finland	10	3	2	1	4	26	31	−5	14	Fourth place
5	A	United States	8	6	0	0	2	31	16	+15	18	Eliminated in Quarter-finals
6	B	Switzerland	8	3	2	2	1	23	17	+6	15	Eliminated in Quarter-finals
7	B	Czech Republic	8	3	2	0	3	23	17	+6	13	Eliminated in Quarter-finals
8	A	Germany (H)	8	2	2	1	3	21	25	−4	11	Eliminated in Quarter-finals
9	B	France (H)	7	2	2	0	3	23	19	+4	10	Eliminated in Group stage
10	A	Latvia	7	3	0	1	3	14	18	−4	10	Eliminated in Group stage
11	B	Norway	7	2	0	2	3	13	19	−6	8	Eliminated in Group stage
12	A	Denmark	7	1	2	0	4	13	22	−9	7	Eliminated in Group stage
13	B	Belarus	7	2	0	1	4	15	27	−12	7	Eliminated in Group stage
14	A	Slovakia	7	0	1	2	4	12	28	−16	4	Eliminated in Group stage
15	B	Slovenia	7	0	0	1	6	13	36	−23	1	2018 IIHF World Championship Division I
16	A	Italy	7	0	0	1	6	6	32	−26	1	2018 IIHF World Championship Division I

Source: IIHF.com
(H) Host

== Division I ==
=== Group A ===
The tournament was held in Kyiv, Ukraine from 22 to 28 April 2017.

Pos	Team	Pld	W	OTW	OTL	L	GF	GA	GD	Pts	Qualification or relegation
1	Austria (P)	5	4	0	0	1	22	4	+18	12	2018 IIHF World Championship
2	South Korea (P)	5	3	1	0	1	14	11	+3	11 (Note: Kazakhstan 2–5 South Korea)	2018 IIHF World Championship
3	Kazakhstan	5	3	1	0	1	13	10	+3	11	
4	Poland	5	2	0	1	2	6	17	−11	7	
5	Hungary	5	1	0	0	4	8	14	−6	3	
6	Ukraine (H, R)	5	0	0	1	4	7	14	−7	1	Relegation to 2018 Division I B

Source: IIHF
Rules for classification: 1) points; 2) head-to-head points; 3) head-to-head goal difference; 4) head-to-head number of goals scored; 5) result against closest best-ranked team outside tied teams; 6) result against second-best ranked team outside tied teams; 7) seeding before tournament.
(H) Host; (P) Promoted; (R) Relegated

=== Group B ===
The tournament was held in Belfast, United Kingdom from 23 to 29 April 2017.

Pos	Team	Pld	W	OTW	OTL	L	GF	GA	GD	Pts	Qualification or relegation
1	Great Britain (H, P)	5	5	0	0	0	32	5	+27	15	Promoted to 2018 Division I A
2	Japan	5	4	0	0	1	22	11	+11	12	
3	Lithuania	5	3	0	0	2	18	12	+6	9	
4	Estonia	5	2	0	0	3	11	20	−9	6	
5	Croatia	5	1	0	0	4	14	17	−3	3	
6	Netherlands (R)	5	0	0	0	5	6	38	−32	0	Relegation to 2018 Division II A

Source: IIHF
Rules for classification: 1) points; 2) head-to-head points; 3) head-to-head goal difference; 4) head-to-head number of goals scored; 5) result against closest best-ranked team outside tied teams; 6) result against second-best ranked team outside tied teams; 7) seeding before tournament.
(H) Host; (P) Promoted; (R) Relegated

== Division II ==
=== Group A ===
The tournament was held in Galați, Romania from 3 to 9 April 2017.

Pos	Team	Pld	W	OTW	OTL	L	GF	GA	GD	Pts	Qualification or relegation
1	Romania (H, P)	5	4	0	0	1	24	5	+19	12	Promoted to Division I B
2	Australia	5	3	1	0	1	16	13	+3	11	
3	Serbia	5	2	0	2	1	23	15	+8	8	
4	Belgium	5	2	0	0	3	17	27	−10	6 (Note: Iceland 3–9 Belgium)	
5	Iceland	5	2	0	0	3	10	20	−10	6	
6	Spain (R)	5	0	1	0	4	13	23	−10	2	Relegation to Division II B

Source: IIHF
Rules for classification: 1) points; 2) head-to-head points; 3) head-to-head goal difference; 4) head-to-head number of goals scored; 5) result against closest best-ranked team outside tied teams; 6) result against second-best ranked team outside tied teams; 7) seeding before tournament.
(H) Host; (P) Promoted; (R) Relegated

=== Group B ===
The tournament was held in Auckland, New Zealand from 4 to 10 April 2017.

Pos	Team	Pld	W	OTW	OTL	L	GF	GA	GD	Pts	Qualification or relegation
1	China (P)	5	5	0	0	0	29	12	+17	15	Promoted to Division II A
2	New Zealand (H)	5	4	0	0	1	23	11	+12	12	
3	Israel	5	3	0	0	2	24	14	+10	9	
4	North Korea	5	1	0	0	4	18	33	−15	3 (Note: North Korea 3 Pts, +4 GD; Mexico 3 Pts, +3 GD, Turkey 3 Pts, −7 GD)	
5	Mexico	5	1	0	0	4	12	16	−4	3	
6	Turkey (R)	5	1	0	0	4	7	27	−20	3	Relegation to Division III

Source: IIHF
Rules for classification: 1) points; 2) head-to-head points; 3) head-to-head goal difference; 4) head-to-head number of goals scored; 5) result against closest best-ranked team outside tied teams; 6) result against second-best ranked team outside tied teams; 7) seeding before tournament.
(H) Host; (P) Promoted; (R) Relegated

== Division III ==
The tournament was held in Sofia, Bulgaria from 10 to 16 April 2017. At the September 2016 IIHF congress it was decided to change the format so that there would be a single tournament in Bulgaria.

Rank	Team	Result
1	Luxembourg (P)	Promoted to 2018 IIHF Division II B
2	Bulgaria (H)	
3	Georgia	
4	Hong Kong	
5	South Africa	
6	Chinese Taipei	
7	United Arab Emirates	
–	Bosnia and Herzegovina	Withdrew
