= 2016 IIHF World Championship Division III =

International ice hockey tournament

Tournament details
- Host country: Turkey
- Venue(s): 1 (in 1 host city)
- Dates: 31 March–6 April
- Teams: 6

Tournament statistics
- Games played: 15
- Goals scored: 162 (10.8 per game)
- Attendance: 2,706 (180 per game)
- Scoring leader(s): (Georgia (country)) Boris Kochkin (19 points)

Official website
- IIHF.com

The 2016 IIHF World Championship Division III was an international ice hockey tournament run by the International Ice Hockey Federation. It was contested in Istanbul, Turkey, from 31 March to 6 April 2016. The host team, Turkey, won all of its games and was promoted to Division II B for 2017.

The United Arab Emirates withdrew shortly before the tournament, leaving six teams to play. Bosnia and Herzegovina recorded their first victory in an IIHF tournament, defeating Hong Kong 5–4. Georgia's results were later recorded as 5–0 forfeits due to the use of ineligible players.

== Venue ==
Istanbul

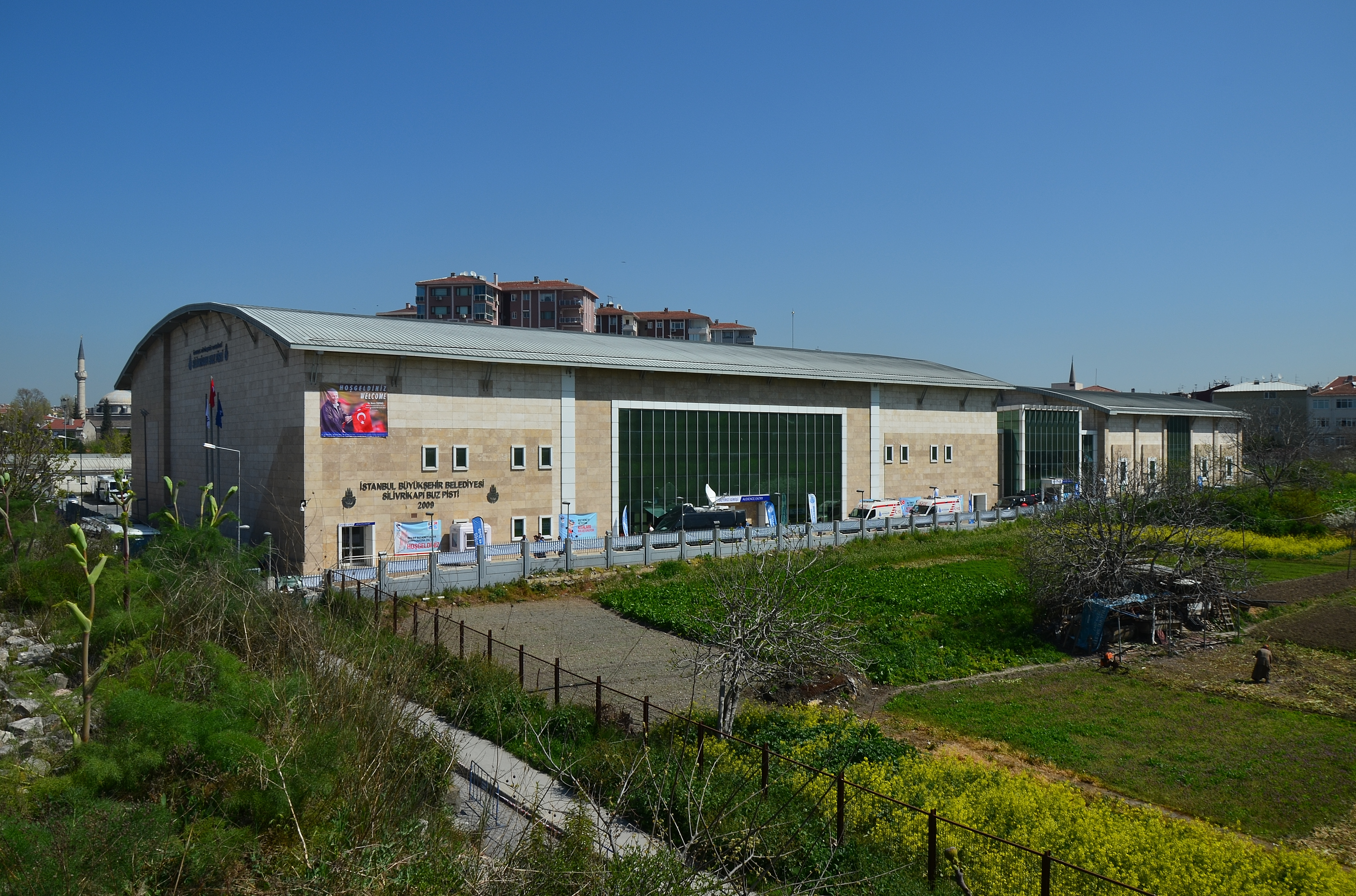

Silivrikapı Ice Skating Hall
Capacity: 900

== Participants ==
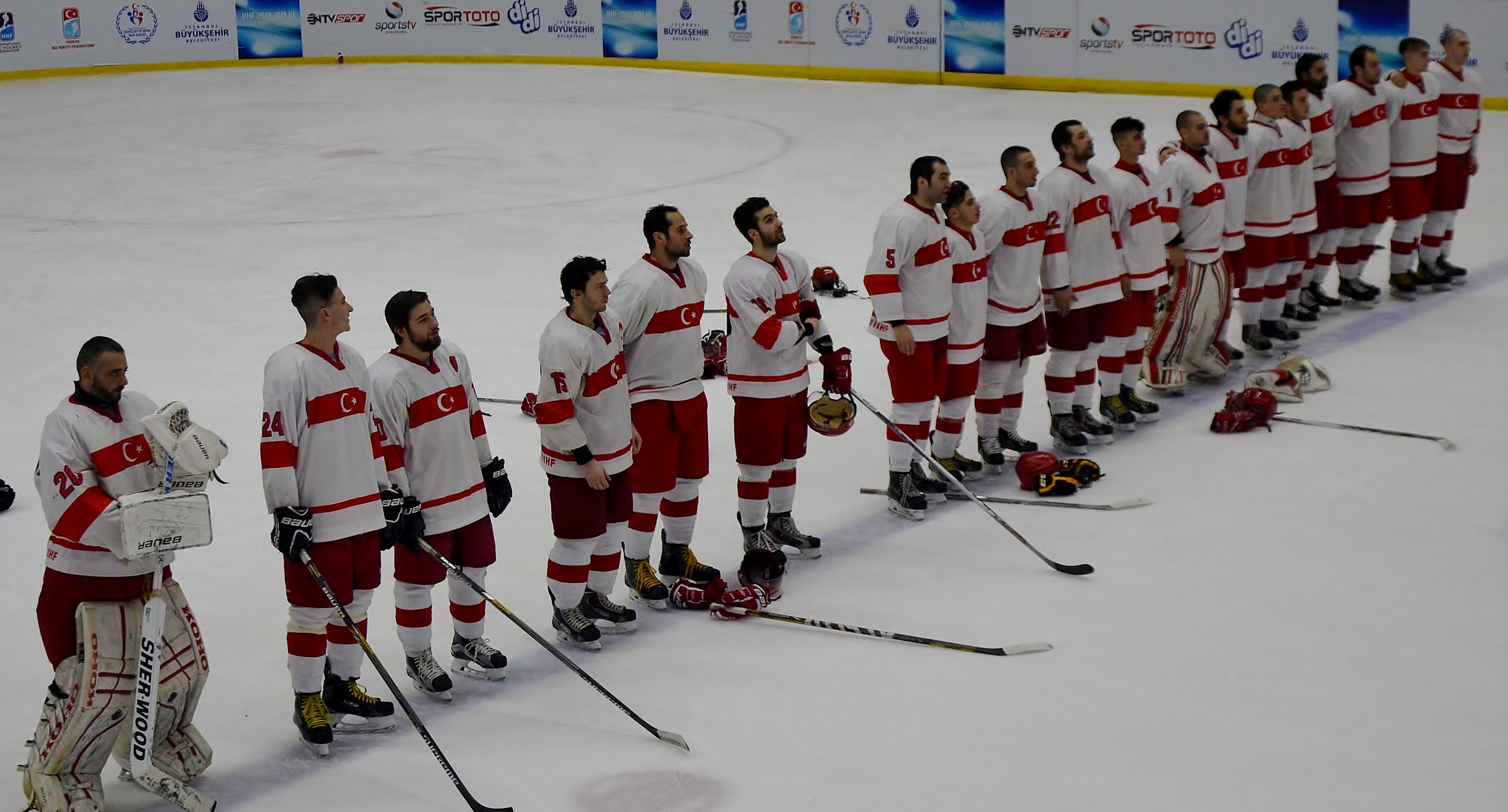
Host nation Turkey won the tournament and were promoted to Division IIB for 2017.

Team	Qualification
South Africa	Placed 6th in Division II B and were relegated.
Turkey	Host, placed 2nd in Division III last year.
Luxembourg	Placed 3rd in Division III last year.
Hong Kong	Placed 4th in Division III last year.
Georgia	Placed 5th in Division III last year.
Bosnia and Herzegovina	Placed 7th in Division III last year.

== Match officials ==
4 referees and 7 linesmen were selected for the tournament.

Referees

- (United Kingdom) Stefan Hogarth
- (Sweden) Christoffer Holm
- (Finland) Joonas Kova
- (Romania) Valentin Lascar

Linesmen

- (Turkey) Yasin Akyürek
- (Turkey) Murat Aygün
- (Norway) Knut Braten
- (Finland) Timo Heinonen
- (United States) Charlie O'Connor
- (Czech Republic) Josef Špůr
- (Lithuania) Laurynas Stepankevičius

== Standings ==
Pos	Team	Pld	W	OTW	OTL	L	GF	GA	GD	Pts	Qualification or relegation
1	Turkey (H, P)	5	5	0	0	0	35	7	+28	15	Promoted to Division II B
2	South Africa	5	4	0	0	1	29	10	+19	12	
3	Luxembourg	5	3	0	0	2	29	14	+15	9	
4	Bosnia and Herzegovina	5	2	0	0	3	12	35	−23	6	
5	Hong Kong	5	1	0	0	4	12	26	−14	3	
6	Georgia	5	0	0	0	5	0	25	−25	0	

Rules for classification: 1) points; 2) head-to-head points; 3) head-to-head goal difference; 4) head-to-head number of goals scored; 5) result against closest best-ranked team outside tied teams; 6) result against second-best ranked team outside tied teams; 7) seeding before tournament.
(H) Host; (P) Promoted

== Results ==
All times are local (UTC+3).

- Due to eligibility violations all of Georgia's games were declared 5–0 forfeits.

31 March 2016; 13:00	Luxembourg	2–3 (1–1, 0–1, 1–1)	South Africa	Silivrikapı Ice Skating Hall, Istanbul; Attendance: 112

Game reference

Philippe Lepage
Goalies
Ashley Bock
Referee:
(Romania) Valentin Lascar
Linesmen:
(Turkey) Yasin Akyürek
(United States) Charlie O'Connor

Holtzem (Cannon) – 02:23	1–0
	1–1	09:29 – Edwards (Giot)
	1–2	35:42 – Botha (Birrell) (PP)
Eriksson – 42:36	2–2
	2–3	58:44 – Botha (Magmoed, Samaai)

22 min
Penalties
12 min
24
Shots
42

31 March 2016; 16:30	Bosnia and Herzegovina	5–4 (1–2, 3–1, 1–1)	Hong Kong	Silivrikapı Ice Skating Hall, Istanbul; Attendance: 156

Game reference

Dino Pašović
Goalies
Ho King Chi King
Referee:
(Finland) Joonas Kova
Linesmen:
(Finland) Timo Heinonen
(Czech Republic) Josef Špůr

	0–1	09:57 – Tang C. (Fung, Kan C.)
	0–2	15:49 – Wong K. (Sham, Tang S.)
Čordalija (PS) – 17:04	1–2
Lemeš (London) – 21:40	2–2
	2–3	24:18 – Ho J. (Kan C.)
Hadžihasanović (Pilav) – 28:10	3–3
Čordalija (Alić) – 32:39	4–3
Hodžić (Nikulin) – 41:17	5–3
	5–4	51:39 – Wong K. (Wong Y., Ho J.) (PP)

6 min
Penalties
8 min
16
Shots
35

31 March 2016; 20:00	Turkey	5–4 (0–1, 3–1, 2–2)	Georgia	Silivrikapı Ice Skating Hall, Istanbul; Attendance: 378

Game reference

Erol Kahraman
Goalies
Andrei Ilienko
Referee:
(Sweden) Christoffer Holm
Linesmen:
(Norway) Knut Braten
(Lithuania) Laurynas Stepankevičius

	0–1	09:48 – Dumbadze
An. Koçoğlu (PP) – 21:55	1–1
Gümüş (K. Salt, Kavaz) – 24:49	2–1
	2–2	29:06 – Kochkin (Geperidze)
Özmen (Solak) – 39:11	3–2
Semiz – 40:23	4–2
	4–3	48:30 – Shalunov (Tsomaia, Svanidze)
	4–4	53:35 – Kochkin
An. Koçoğlu (Al. Koçoğlu) – 56:52	5–4

16 min
Penalties
12 min
40
Shots
29

1 April 2016; 13:00	South Africa	9–1 (0–0, 4–1, 5–0)	Hong Kong	Silivrikapı Ice Skating Hall, Istanbul; Attendance: 79

Game reference

Charl Pretorius
Goalies
Keung Emerson Kwokway
Ho King Chi King
Referee:
(Sweden) Christoffer Holm
Linesmen:
(Turkey) Yasin Akyürek
(Finland) Timo Heinonen

Marais (Samaai) – 28:18	1–0
	1–1	32:12 – Wong K. (Kan S., Ho J.)
Birrell (Botha, Samaai) – 32:12	2–1
Valadas – 38:10	3–1
Birrell (Samaai) – 38:58	4–1
Giot (Magmoed, Edwards) – 41:48	5–1
Van Doesburgh (W. Du Preez, Marais) – 43:31	6–1
Samaai (Birrell) – 48:52	7–1
Edwards (Marais, Valadas) – 50:57	8–1
Birrell – 57:10	9–1

8 min
Penalties
14 min
50
Shots
9

1 April 2016; 16:30	Georgia	8–0 (4–0, 2–0, 2–0)	Bosnia and Herzegovina	Silivrikapı Ice Skating Hall, Istanbul; Attendance: 93

Game reference

Andrei Ilienko
Kakha Ambrolava
Goalies
Dino Pašović
Edis Pribišić
Referee:
(Romania) Valentin Lascar
Linesmen:
(Turkey) Murat Aygün
(Czech Republic) Josef Špůr

Kochkin (Shalunov) – 09:09	1–0
Tsomaia (Kochkin) (PP) – 11:30	2–0
Geperidze (Dumbadze) – 16:06	3–0
Kozyulin (Kochkin) – 16:50	4–0
D. Oganeziani (Kozyulin) – 26:45	5–0
Kochkin (Gi. Jeiranashvili) – 34:07	6–0
D. Oganeziani (Kochkin) – 40:31	7–0
Kavkasidze (Minasiani, Tsomaia) – 49:22	8–0

34 min
Penalties
51 min
35
Shots
14

1 April 2016; 20:00	Turkey	10–2 (3–0, 4–2, 3–0)	Luxembourg	Silivrikapı Ice Skating Hall, Istanbul; Attendance: 383

Game reference

Erol Kahraman
Goalies
Philippe Lepage
Referee:
(United Kingdom) Stefan Hogarth
Linesmen:
(Norway) Knut Braten
(United States) Charlie O'Connor

Al. Koçoğlu (Kavaz) – 02:17	1–0
Semiz (Gümüş, Özmen) (PP) – 12:01	2–0
Halil – 13:35	3–0
An. Koçoğlu (Al. Koçoğlu) – 21:49	4–0
	4–1	26:28 – Cannon (R. Beran)
Özmen (Semiz) – 27:17	5–1
	5–2	34:23 – T. Beran (G. Scheier, R. Beran)
Özmen (Solak) – 35:15	6–2
Gümüş (Semiz, Özmen) – 39:52	7–2
Özmen (Semiz, Solak) – 44:45	8–2
Ö. Kars (Kavaz) – 50:11	9–2
Solak (Semiz, Y. Kars) – 55:03	10–2

10 min
Penalties
16 min
49
Shots
23

3 April 2016; 13:00	Luxembourg	7–1 (3–0, 3–1, 1–0)	Hong Kong	Silivrikapı Ice Skating Hall, Istanbul; Attendance: 83

Game reference

Gilles Mangen
Goalies
Ho King Chi King
Referee:
(Romania) Valentin Lascar
Linesmen:
(Turkey) Murat Aygün
(Finland) Timo Heinonen

G. Scheier (T. Beran, R. Beran) – 09:59	1–0
R. Scheier (Cannon, Holtzem) (PP) – 13:17	2–0
Eriksson (Cannon, Sinner) – 15:27	3–0
Cannon (Holtzem, R. Scheier) – 20:27	4–0
Eriksson (Cannon) – 28:28	5–0
	5–1	29:42 – Sham (Fung, Wong Y.) (PP)
Holtzem (Cannon, R. Scheier) – 30:01	6–1
Eriksson (Cannon, Holtzem) – 45:40	7–1

18 min
Penalties
6 min
37
Shots
31

3 April 2016; 16:30	Turkey	8–2 (4–0, 3–2, 1–0)	Bosnia and Herzegovina	Silivrikapı Ice Skating Hall, Istanbul; Attendance: 381

Game reference

Erol Kahraman
Tolga Bozacı
Goalies
Dino Pašović
Edis Pribišić
Referee:
(Finland) Joonas Kova
Linesmen:
(United States) Charlie O'Connor
(Czech Republic) Josef Špůr

Semiz (Solak) – 00:30	1–0
H. Salt (Aktürk) – 00:52	2–0
Ö. Kars (Savaş) – 03:24	3–0
Bakal (Semiz, Özmen) (PP) – 09:21	4–0
Özmen (Solak, Öztürk) – 23:16	5–0
Özmen (Solak, Semiz) – 23:39	6–0
	6–1	24:37 – Hadžihasanović (London)
Semiz (Özmen) (SH) – 31:34	7–1
	7–2	38:42 – Hodžić
Al. Koçoğlu (Özmen, Gümüş) (PP) – 53:21	8–2

10 min
Penalties
14 min
68
Shots
16

3 April 2016; 20:00	South Africa	5–6 (4–2, 0–1, 1–3)	Georgia	Silivrikapı Ice Skating Hall, Istanbul; Attendance: 92

Game reference

Charl Pretorius
Goalies
Andrei Ilienko
Referee:
(United Kingdom) Stefan Hogarth
Linesmen:
(Turkey) Yasin Akyürek
(Lithuania) Laurynas Stepankevičius

Samaai (Van Doesburgh, W. Du Preez) – 02:35	1–0
Birrell (Samaai) – 02:46	2–0
	2–1	06:13 – Kochkin (PS)
Giot (Magmoed, Edwards) – 10:42	3–1
	3–2	11:21 – Kozyulin (Kochkin)
Marais (Magmoed, Samaai) (PP) – 19:25	4–2
	4–3	21:15 – Kochkin
Verwey – 42:16	5–3
	5–4	44:40 – Kochkin (Kozyulin)
	5–5	50:09 – Kurbatov (Tsomaia, Kochkin) (PP)
	5–6	51:06 – Kozyulin

14 min
Penalties
24 min
49
Shots
28

4 April 2016; 13:00	Hong Kong	1–5 (1–2, 0–2, 0–1)	Turkey	Silivrikapı Ice Skating Hall, Istanbul; Attendance: 282

Game reference

Keung Emerson Kwokway
Goalies
Erol Kahraman
Referee:
(Romania) Valentin Lascar
Linesmen:
(Norway) Knut Braten
(Lithuania) Laurynas Stepankevičius

Ho J. – 00:16	1–0
	1–1	16:06 – Özmen (Solak, Y. Kars)
	1–2	18:30 – Özmen (Semiz)
	1–3	22:34 – H. Salt (Gümüş, Y. Kars)
	1–4	27:37 – Al. Koçoğlu (Karakoç)
	1–5	55:35 – Karakoç (An. Koçoğlu, Y. Kars)

8 min
Penalties
20 min
14
Shots
38

4 April 2016; 16:30	Georgia	5–0 (1–0, 3–0, 1–0)	Luxembourg	Silivrikapı Ice Skating Hall, Istanbul; Attendance: 33

Game reference

Andrei Ilienko
Goalies
Gilles Mangen
Referee:
(Sweden) Christoffer Holm
Linesmen:
(Turkey) Yasin Akyürek
(Finland) Timo Heinonen

Kurbatov (Tsomaia) (PP) – 10:06	1–0
Kurbatov (Kozyulin, Kochkin) (PP) – 26:01	2–0
Kozyulin (Svanidze, Kurbatov) – 34:59	3–0
Kozyulin (Kochkin) – 38:39	4–0
Kozyulin (Svanidze) – 48:45	5–0

12 min
Penalties
18 min
44
Shots
20

4 April 2016; 20:00	Bosnia and Herzegovina	0–10 (0–2, 0–7, 0–1)	South Africa	Silivrikapı Ice Skating Hall, Istanbul; Attendance: 65

Game reference

Edis Pribišić
Dino Pašović
Goalies
Ashley Bock
Referee:
(Finland) Joonas Kova
Linesmen:
(Turkey) Murat Aygün
(United States) Charlie O'Connor

0–1	01:33 – Marais (Valadas)
0–2	14:35 – Van Doesburgh (Willemstijn)
0–3	25:22 – Marais (Samaai) (PP)
0–4	25:36 – Valadas (Edwards)
0–5	26:13 – Valadas (Gonsalves, Reeves)
0–6	27:27 – Marais (Gonsalves, Bremner)
0–7	30:23 – S. Du Preez (Samaai, W. Du Preez)
0–8	35:02 – W. Du Preez (Marais)
0–9	39:09 – Giot (Edwards)
0–10	50:35 – Edwards (Giot, Valadas) (PP)

14 min
Penalties
2 min
18
Shots
42

6 April 2016; 13:00	South Africa	2–7 (1–3, 0–2, 1–2)	Turkey	Silivrikapı Ice Skating Hall, Istanbul; Attendance: 451

Game reference

Ashley Bock
Goalies
Erol Kahraman
Referee:
(Sweden) Christoffer Holm
Linesmen:
(Norway) Knut Braten
(United States) Charlie O'Connor

Botha (Samaai) (PP) – 01:48	1–0
	1–1	13:55 – Semiz (An. Koçoğlu, Özmen) (PP2)
	1–2	15:15 – Özmen (PP)
	1–3	15:30 – Al. Koçoğlu (An. Koçoğlu)
	1–4	25:19 – An. Koçoğlu
	1–5	32:44 – Al. Koçoğlu (An. Koçoğlu, Semiz) (PP)
	1–6	41:58 – Özmen (Al. Koçoğlu, An. Koçoğlu) (PP)
	1–7	49:21 – Gümüş (Halil, Savaş)
Valadas (Giot) (PP) – 56:53	2–7

12 min
Penalties
18 min
35
Shots
38

6 April 2016; 16:30	Hong Kong	3–14 (0–4, 2–6, 1–4)	Georgia	Silivrikapı Ice Skating Hall, Istanbul; Attendance: 51

Game reference

Ho King Chi King
Keung Emerson Kwokway
Goalies
Andrei Ilienko
Referee:
(Finland) Joonas Kova
Linesmen:
(Czech Republic) Josef Špůr
(Lithuania) Laurynas Stepankevičius

	0–1	01:15 – G. Oganeziani (Kochkin)
	0–2	08:41 – Dumbadze (Kurbatov, Svanidze)
	0–3	10:01 – Kozyulin (Svanidze, Kochkin) (PP)
	0–4	12:46 – Kochkin (Kozyulin) (SH)
	0–5	23:25 – Dumbadze (Svanidze) (PP)
	0–6	23:38 – Kochkin
	0–7	31:59 – Kozyulin (Gi. Jeiranashvili)
Wong K. (Tang S.) – 33:43	1–7
	1–8	34:01 – Kurbatov
	1–9	35:52 – Kochkin
	1–10	38:05 – Kozyulin (Svanidze) (SH)
Wong Y. (Wong K., Ho J.) (PP) – 39:06	2–10
	2–11	42:07 – Svanidze (Kurbatov)
Ho J. (Kan S., Wong K.) (PP) – 45:40	3–11
	3–12	48:14 – D. Oganeziani (Kozyulin)
	3–13	52:53 – Svanidze (Gi. Jeiranashvili, D. Oganeziani)
	3–14	56:51 – Svanidze (PS)

8 min
Penalties
14 min
16
Shots
49

6 April 2016; 20:00	Luxembourg	13–0 (4–0, 3–0, 6–0)	Bosnia and Herzegovina	Silivrikapı Ice Skating Hall, Istanbul; Attendance: 67

Game reference

Gilles Mangen
Goalies
Dino Pašović
Edis Pribišić
Referee:
(United Kingdom) Stefan Hogarth
Linesmen:
(Turkey) Murat Aygün
(Finland) Timo Heinonen

Cannon (Holtzem, Eriksson) – 08:28	1–0
T. Beran (PS) – 10:48	2–0
T. Beran (R. Beran) – 12:43	3–0
Eriksson (Sinner) (SH) – 14:59	4–0
Eriksson (Cannon) – 29:18	5–0
R. Beran – 29:58	6–0
T. Beran (Cannon) – 33:04	7–0
T. Beran (R. Beran) – 43:04	8–0
Mossong (Mosr, Farinon) – 43:28	9–0
Holtzem (R. Scheier, Eriksson) (PP) – 44:49	10–0
Holtzem (Schön) (PP) – 47:20	11–0
Eriksson (Cannon) – 49:31	12–0
Cannon (Holtzem) – 59:24	13–0

12 min
Penalties
32 min
54
Shots
25

== Awards and statistics ==
=== Awards ===
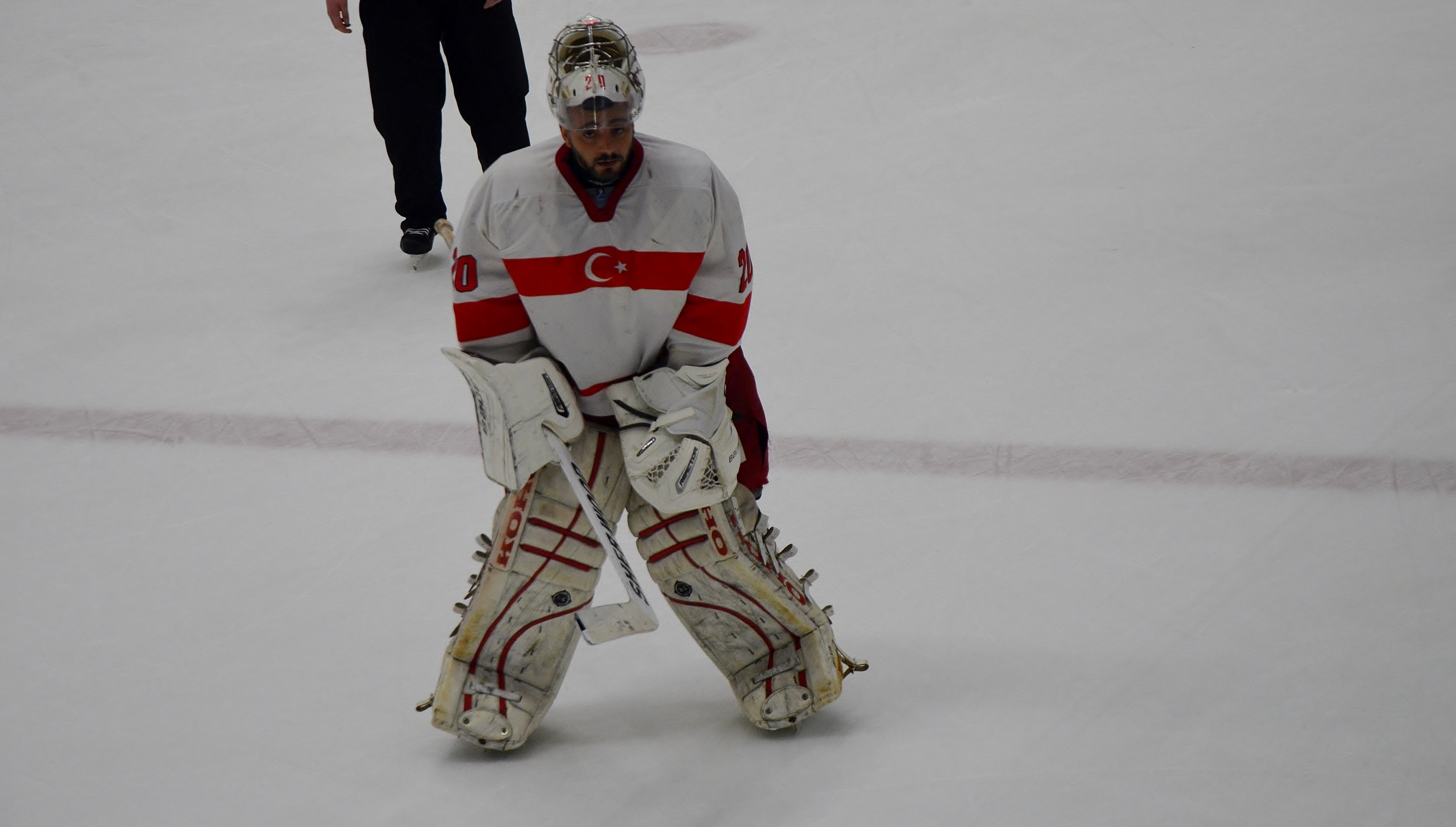
Erol Kahraman of Turkey was named the best goaltender of the tournament.

- Best players selected by the directorate:
  - Best Goaltender: (Turkey) Erol Kahraman
  - Best Defenceman: (South Africa) Andre Marais
  - Best Forward: (Georgia (country)) Boris Kochkin

Source: IIHF.com

=== Scoring leaders ===
Player	GP	G	A	Pts	+/−	PIM	POS
(Georgia (country)) Boris Kochkin	5	10	9	19	+18	8	F
(Turkey) Emrah Özmen	5	10	6	16	+11	2	F
(Georgia (country)) Artem Kozyulin	5	9	4	13	+12	14	D
(Turkey) Serdar Semiz	5	5	8	13	+10	8	F
(Luxembourg) Colm Cannon	5	4	9	13	+7	4	F
(South Africa) Uthman Samaai	5	3	8	11	+7	0	F
(Georgia (country)) Roland Svanidze	5	3	7	10	+3	0	F
(South Africa) Andre Marais	5	5	4	9	+9	6	D
(South Africa) Joel Holtzem	5	4	5	9	+7	6	F
(Turkey) Andy Koçoğlu	5	4	5	9	+5	6	F

GP = Games played; G = Goals; A = Assists; Pts = Points; +/− = Plus/minus; PIM = Penalties in minutes; POS = Position
Source: IIHF.com

=== Goaltending leaders ===
Only the top five goaltenders, based on save percentage, who have played at least 40% of their team's minutes, are included in this list.

Player	TOI	GA	GAA	SA	Sv%	SO
(Luxembourg) Gilles Mangen	180:00	6	2.00	100	94.00	1
(Georgia (country)) Andrei Ilienko	263:04	10	2.28	126	92.06	1
(Turkey) Erol Kahraman	260:00	9	2.08	108	91.67	0
(South Africa) Ashley Bock	180:00	9	3.00	80	88.75	1
(Luxembourg) Philippe Lepage	120:00	13	6.50	91	85.71	0

TOI = Time on Ice (minutes:seconds); SA = Shots against; GA = Goals against; GAA = Goals against average; Sv% = Save percentage; SO = Shutouts
Source: IIHF.com
