= Bosnia and Herzegovina men's national ice hockey team =

Bosnia and Herzegovina
- Nickname: Ledeni zmajevi (The Ice Dragons)
- Association: Hokejaški savez Bosne i Hercegovine
- General manager: Dino Pašović
- Head coach: Ross MacLean
- Assistants: Nermin Alić; Will Richard
- Captain: Haris Mrkva
- Most games: Tarik Ćatović; Nermin Alić (31)
- Top scorer: Mirza Omer (25)
- Most points: Mirza Omer (52)
- Home stadium: Juan Antonio Samaranch Olympic Hall
- Team colors
- IIHF code: BIH

Ranking
- Current IIHF: 46 ▲1 (3 June 2026)
- Highest IIHF: 45 (2016)
- Lowest IIHF: 50 (2022)

First international
- Greece 10–1 Bosnia and Herzegovina (Sarajevo, BIH; 15 February 2008)

Biggest win
- Bosnia and Herzegovina 15–1 Malaysia (Sarajevo, Bosnia and Herzegovina; 5 March 2023)

Biggest defeat
- North Korea 13–0 Bosnia and Herzegovina (İzmir, Turkey; 3 April 2015); Luxembourg 13–0 Bosnia and Herzegovina (Istanbul, Turkey; 6 April 2016)

IIHF World Championships
- Appearances: 10 (first in 2008)
- Best result: 43rd (2026)

International record (W–L–T)
- 22–37–0

The Bosnia and Herzegovina national ice hockey team (Bosnian and Croatian: Hokejaška reprezentacija BiH; Serbian: Хокејашка репрезентација БиХ) is the national men's ice hockey team of Bosnia and Herzegovina. It is a member of the International Ice Hockey Federation through the Bosnia and Herzegovina Ice Hockey Federation.

== Withdrawal from 2017 IIHF tournament ==
Bosnia and Herzegovina decided to withdraw from the 2017 IIHF World Championship Division III tournament in Sofia, Bulgaria, and thus all their games were counted as 5–0 forfeits for the opposing teams.

== Tournament record ==
=== Olympic Games ===
Year	Host	Result	Pld	W	OTW	OTL	L
1920 through 1992		As part of Yugoslavia					
1994 through 2026		did not qualify					
Total		–	–	–	–	–	–

=== World Championships ===
Year	Host	Result	Pld	W	OTW	OTL	L
1930 through 1992		As part of Yugoslavia					
1993 through 2007		did not enter					
2008	(Bosnia and Herzegovina) Sarajevo	47th place (2nd in Division III Q)	2	1	0	0	1
2009 through 2014		did not participate					
2015	(Turkey) İzmir	47th place (7th in Division III)	6	0	0	0	6
2016	(Turkey) Istanbul	44th place (4th in Division III)	5	2	0	0	3
2017	(Bulgaria) Sofia	Withdrew from tournament (All games marked as 5–0 forfeits)					
2018	(Bosnia and Herzegovina) Sarajevo	48th place (2nd in Division III Q)	3	2	0	0	1
2019	(United Arab Emirates) Abu Dhabi	50th place (4th in Division III Q)	5	2	0	1	2
2020	(South Africa) Cape Town	Cancelled due to the COVID-19 pandemic					
2021	(South Africa) Cape Town	Cancelled due to the COVID-19 pandemic					
2022	(South Africa) Cape Town	44th place (3rd in Division III B)	4	0	0	0	4
2023	(Bosnia and Herzegovina) Sarajevo	47th place (2nd in Division III B)	5	3	1	0	1
2024	(Bosnia and Herzegovina) Sarajevo	47th place (1st in Division III B)	5	4	0	1	0
2025	(Turkey) Istanbul	45th place (5th in Division III A)	5	1	0	0	4
2026	(South Africa) Cape Town	43rd place (3rd in Division III A)	5	2	1	0	2
2027	(Taiwan) Taichung	(Division III A)					
Total		9/16	45	17	2	2	24

== All-time record against other nations ==
Last match update: 19 April 2026

Team	GP	W	L	T	GF	GA
Armenia (Note: Bosnia and Herzegovina was awarded a 5–0 victory over Armenia in the 2008 World Championship Division III Qualification tournament after Armenia forfeited the game due to player eligibility issues. The score of the game was originally an 18–1 for Armenia.)	1	1	0	0	5	0
Bulgaria	1	0	1	0	0	5
Chinese Taipei	1	0	1	0	0	5
Georgia (Note: Bosnia and Herzegovina was awarded a 5–0 victory over Georgia in the 2016 World Championship tournament after Georgia forfeited the game due to the use of ineligible players. The score of the game was originally an 8–0 for Georgia.)	3	1	2	0	8	18
Greece	1	0	1	0	1	10
Hong Kong	6	3	3	0	21	26
Iran	2	2	0	0	12	2
Kuwait	2	2	0	0	17	1
Kyrgyzstan (Note: Bosnia and Herzegovina was awarded a 5–0 victory over Kyrgyzstan in the 2019 World Championship Division III Qualification tournament after Kyrgyzstan forfeited the game due to the use of ineligible players. The score of the game was originally an 14–3 for Kyrgyzstan.)	4	1	3	0	10	30
Luxembourg	4	1	3	0	7	30
Malaysia	1	1	0	0	15	1
Mexico	1	1	0	0	4	3
North Macedonia	2	1	1	0	14	14
North Korea	2	1	1	0	4	15
Philippines	1	1	0	0	6	3
Singapore	2	2	0	0	17	4
South Africa	6	0	6	0	10	36
Thailand	4	1	3	0	16	19
Turkey	7	1	6	0	14	44
Turkmenistan	3	1	2	0	8	19
United Arab Emirates	5	1	4	0	14	27
Total	59	22	37	0	203	312
