= Georgia men's national ice hockey team =

National men's ice hockey team of Georgia

Georgia
- Association: Georgian Ice Hockey National Federation
- Head coach: Aleksandr Vedernikov
- Assistants: Revaz Tsomaia
- Captain: Ivan Karelin
- Most games: Vitali Dumbadze (35)
- Top scorer: Artyom Kozyulin (27)
- Most points: Artyom Kozyulin (54)
- Team colors
- IIHF code: GEO

Ranking
- Current IIHF: 32 ▲4 (3 June 2026)
- Highest IIHF: 38 (2020–21)
- Lowest IIHF: 53 (2023)

First international
- South Africa 8–1 Georgia (Yerevan, Armenia; 12 April 2010)

Biggest win
- Georgia 19–0 United Arab Emirates (Sofia, Bulgaria; 13 April 2017)

Biggest defeat
- Armenia 22–1 Georgia (Yerevan, Armenia; 12 April 2010); North Korea 22–1 Georgia (Kockelscheuer, Luxembourg; 6 April 2014)

IIHF World Championships
- Appearances: 10 (first in 2013)
- Best result: 30th (2023)

International record (W–L–T)
- 24–32–0

The Georgian men's national ice hockey team (Georgian: საქართველოს ეროვნული ყინულის ჰოკეის ნაკრები) is the national men's ice hockey team of Georgia, and has been a member of the International Ice Hockey Federation (IIHF) since 8 May 2009. Georgia first played in the World Championships tournament in 2013, and remained at Division III level until winning at that level in 2018 and earning a promotion to Division II Group B, where they currently play.

As of 2025, Georgia is ranked 45th in the World Ranking. As a transcontinental country, it is also included in the specialized Asian Ranking, where it is currently placed 9th.

Though ice hockey was first introduced to Georgia in the 1960s, the sport was never very popular and there were long stretches when it was not played at all. In 2004 the Georgian Ice Hockey Federation was established, and a domestic league began in 2007, allowing for the development of the national team and its entry into international competition in 2010, playing their first competitive matches in 2012.

== History ==
=== Soviet Union ===
Ice hockey was introduced in Georgia in the 1960s, part of a Soviet policy to introduce winter sports across the country. A trainer from Moscow, Valentin Zakharov, was sent to Georgia to train youth in the sport. As Tbilisi, the capital, had no rink, most of the initial exercises involved dry-land training. As the Georgian Soviet Socialist Republic, Georgia played its first game in 1962 during the Winter Spartakiad which was held in Sverdlovsk, Soviet Union. Georgia played seven games, winning their matches against the Kirghiz SSR and the Armenian SSR, while losing the remaining games to the Lithuanian SSR twice, the Kazakh SSR, the Estonian SSR and the Latvian SSR.

Zakharov left Georgia in 1966, and hockey effectively ended in Georgia. It was revived in 1978 by one of Zakharov's students, Nodar Donadze, who established a club in Tbilisi. This saw some further developments, with one player, goaltender Kote Bakhutashvili, invited to join the youth development team of CSKA Moscow, the dominant team in the Soviet league, in the late 1980s; however, it was ultimately ended in 1987. As ice hockey was not popular in Georgia, an ice rink built in Tbilisi was demolished in the post-Soviet era.

=== Modern era ===
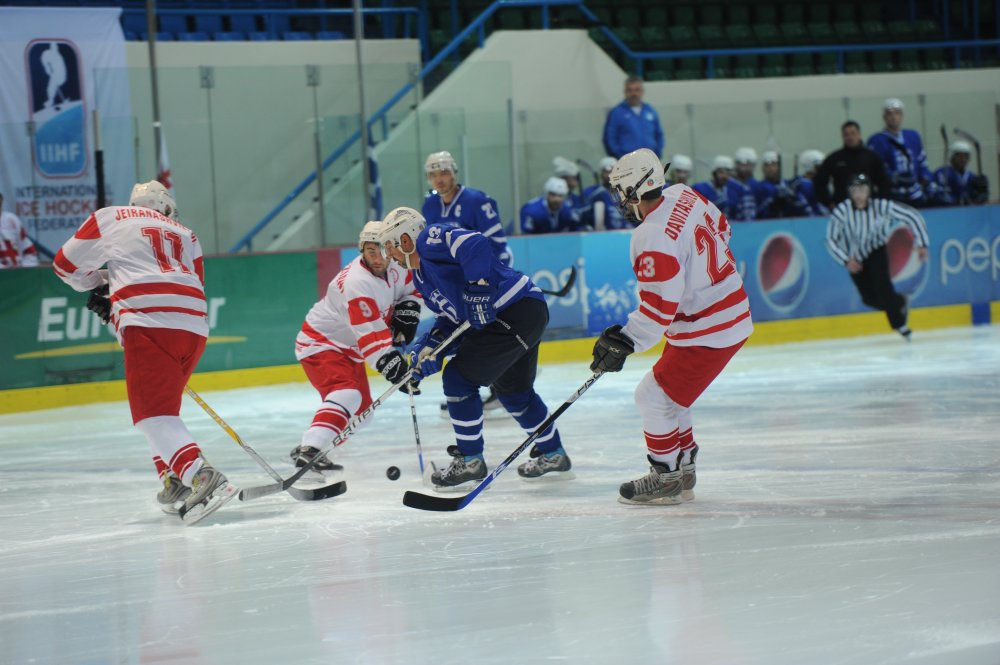
Georgia and Greece during the 2013 World Championship Division III Qualification. Greece won the match, 13–0.

Two students of Donadze, Denis Davidov and Lasha Tsagareishvili, established the Georgian Ice Hockey Federation in 2004. A national league was started in 2007. In 2009 Georgia joined the International Ice Hockey Federation (IIHF) as an associate member. Shortly after being accepted into the IIHF both Davidov and Tsagareishvili, along with four others (including the president of the Ice Hockey Federation of Armenia) were killed in a car accident in Turkey, forcing the Georgian Ice Hockey Federation to delay plans to start a national team.

Georgia first played an international match in 2010, when they travelled to Yerevan, Armenia, which was hosting the 2010 Division III World Championship. They played exhibition games against South Africa and Armenia, losing 8–1 and 22–1, respectively. Georgia made their debut in the World Championship in 2012, playing in the 2013 Division III Qualification tournament held in Abu Dhabi, United Arab Emirates. They lost all three games, being outscored 28 goals to one (Gocha Jeiranashvili scored the lone goal, Georgia's first in IIHF play, in the final game against the United Arab Emirates), and failed to qualify for the Division III tournament. The following year Georgia was placed in Division III, as several teams did not participate. They scored three goals and gave up seventy-eight in the five games, all losses. The 2015 Division III tournament saw Georgia record their first win, against Bosnia and Herzegovina, followed by an overtime victory against the United Arab Emirates. The fourth-place finish was considered a great success, and credited to new players: Vitali Dumbadze and Dimitri Smetanin scored 17 of Georgia's 20 goals, while Andrei Ilienko was named the top goaltender of the tournament.

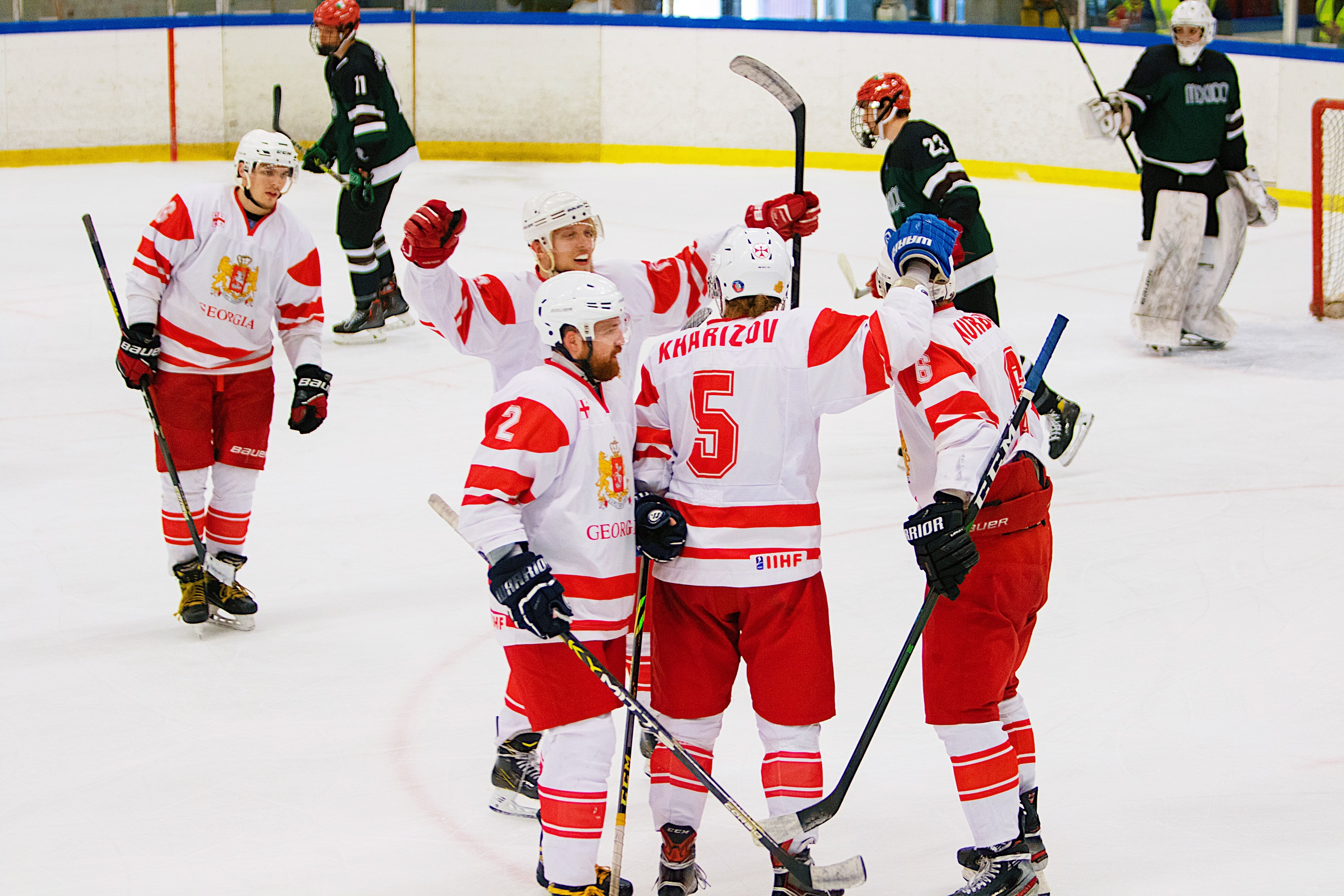
The Georgian national team at the 2022 World Championship Division IIB

In October 2015 Georgia participated in the first game of the 2018 Winter Olympic qualification tournament, against Bulgaria, losing the match 9–1. Funding from the Georgian government came for the first time in 2015; prior to that the players and management had to pay all expenses. In the 2016 Division III tournament, they finished second after winning four games out of five, only losing to Turkey 5–4, and having the tournament's leading scorer, Boris Kochkin (who had 10 goals and 9 assists). However, all their matches were later nullified and the results recorded as 5–0 forfeits due to Georgia's use of ineligible players. At the 2017 Division III tournament they placed third, winning three of their five games. Five Georgians placed in the top ten scorers, including Artem Kozyulin in first with 25 points (13 goals and 12 assists), while Artem Kurbatov was named the tournament's best defeceman. In the 2018 Division III tournament, they finished first after winning four games out of five, losing one game to South Africa 4–2. Five of the top ten scorers in the tournament were from the Georgian team, including Aleksandr Zhuzhunashvili, who led the tournament in goals (10), assists (9), and points (19), and was named the best forward. For the first time, Georgia earned promotion to Division IIB for 2019. The result was attributed to a policy of naturalization: three of the top five scorers had Russian or Ukrainian surnames, while all five learned hockey outside of Georgia. The result had Georgia place 40th in the IIHF World Ranking, their highest spot to date.

== Honours ==
- IIHF World Championship Division III
  - Winners: (1) 2018
- IIHF World Championship Division II
  - Winners: (1) 2025

== World Championship record ==
Year	Host	Result	Pld	W	OW	OL	L
1954 through 1991		As part of the Soviet Union					
1992 through 2012		Did not enter					
2013	(United Arab Emirates) Abu Dhabi	48th place (4th in Division IIIQ)	3	0	0	0	3
2014	(Luxembourg) Kockelscheuer	46th place (6th in Division III)	5	0	0	0	5
2015	(Turkey) İzmir	45th place (5th in Division III)	6	1	1	0	4
2016	(Turkey) Istanbul	Disqualified from tournament (all games marked as 5–0 forfeits)					
2017	(Bulgaria) Sofia	43rd place (3rd in Division III)	5	3	0	0	2
2018	(South Africa) Cape Town	41st place (1st in Division III)	5	4	0	0	1
2019	Mexico City	38th place (4th in Division II B)	5	2	0	0	3
2020	(Iceland) Reykjavík	Cancelled due to the COVID-19 pandemic					
2021	(Iceland) Reykjavík	Cancelled due to the COVID-19 pandemic					
2022	(Iceland) Reykjavík	33rd place (2nd in Division II B)	4	3	0	0	1
2023	(Spain) Madrid	Disqualified from tournament (results annulled, relegated)					
2024	(Bulgaria) Sofia	37th place (3rd in Division II B)	5	3	0	0	2
2025	(New Zealand) Dunedin	35th place (1st in Division II B)	5	4	1	0	0
2026	(United Arab Emirates) Al-Ain	Cancelled due to the 2026 Iran war					
2027	(United Arab Emirates) Al-Ain	(Division II A)					

== All-time record against other nations ==
Updated 2 May 2025

Team	Played	Won	Tied	Lost	GF	GA
Armenia	1	0	0	1	1	22
Australia	1	1	0	0	3	2
Belgium	2	1	0	1	6	7
Bosnia and Herzegovina	3	2	0	1	18	8
Bulgaria	7	4	0	3	35	50
Chinese Taipei	3	3	0	0	20	7
Croatia	1	1	0	0	6	0
Greece	1	0	0	1	0	13
Hong Kong	5	2	0	3	28	32
Iceland	4	3	0	1	16	9
Israel	2	1	0	1	10	10
Luxembourg	4	0	0	4	7	45
Mexico	2	2	0	0	8	2
Mongolia	1	0	0	1	0	6
Netherlands	1	0	0	1	2	8
New Zealand	3	1	0	2	9	12
North Korea	3	0	0	3	9	43
South Africa	4	1	0	3	9	22
Spain	2	0	0	2	1	7
Thailand	2	2	0	0	25	1
Turkey	5	3	0	2	18	22
United Arab Emirates	4	2	0	2	26	19
22 National teams	61	29	0	32	257	347
