= 2015 IIHF World Championship Division III =

Winter sport tournament in İzmir

Tournament details
- Host country: Turkey
- Venue(s): 1 (in 1 host city)
- Dates: 3–12 April
- Teams: 7

Tournament statistics
- Games played: 21
- Goals scored: 215 (10.24 per game)
- Attendance: 7,955 (379 per game)
- Scoring leader(s): (Turkey) Alec Koçoğlu (18 points)

Official website
- IIHF.com

The 2015 IIHF World Championship Division III was an international ice hockey tournament run by the International Ice Hockey Federation. It was contested in İzmir, Turkey, from 3 to 12 April 2015. Seven nations participated, including Bosnia and Herzegovina, who joined the world championships for the first time since 2008. After three consecutive years of finishing in the second place, North Korea won the tournament and was promoted to Division II Group B for 2016.

Divisional tournaments are designed, by the rules, to include six teams, however the Bosnian federation asked to be included and the Turkish organizers agreed. Georgia recorded their first victory, defeating Bosnia and Herzegovina 4–1.

== Venue ==
İzmir
Ice Sports Hall
Capacity: 1,751
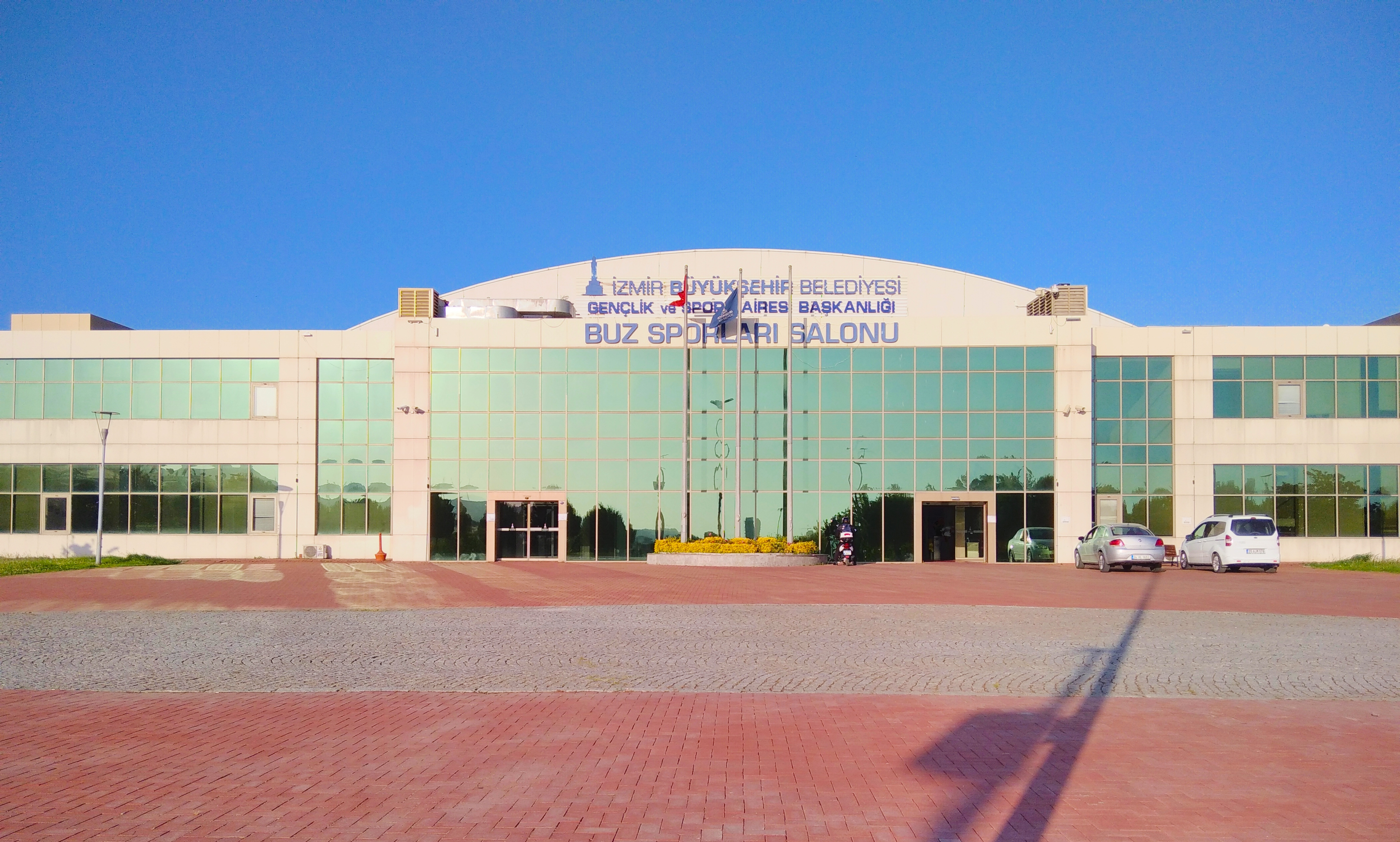

== Participants ==
Team	Qualification
Turkey	Host, placed 6th in Division II B and were relegated.
North Korea	Placed 2nd in Division III last year.
Luxembourg	Placed 3rd in Division III last year.
Hong Kong	Placed 4th in Division III last year.
United Arab Emirates	Placed 5th in Division III last year.
Georgia	Placed 6th in Division III last year.
Bosnia and Herzegovina	Did not enter last year. Last played in 2008.

== Match officials ==
4 referees and 7 linesmen were selected for the tournament.

Referees

- (France) Geoffrey Barcelo
- (China) Feng Lei
- (Hungary) Gergely Kincses
- (Kazakhstan) Sergei Sobolev

Linesmen

- (Turkey) Murat Aygün
- (Ukraine) Anton Gladchenko
- (Turkey) Cemal Ersin Kaya
- (Slovenia) Grega Markizeti
- (Israel) Gil Haim Tichon
- (Romania) Mihai Ariel Trandafir
- (Kazakhstan) Vladimir Yefremov

== Standings ==
Team	Pld	W	OTW	OTL	L	GF	GA	GD	Pts	Qualification
North Korea	6	5	1	0	0	50	9	+41	17	Promoted to Division II B for 2016
Turkey	6	5	0	1	0	59	11	+48	16	
Luxembourg	6	4	0	0	2	39	19	+20	12	
Hong Kong	6	3	0	0	3	30	30	0	9	
Georgia	6	1	1	0	4	20	56	−36	5	
United Arab Emirates	6	1	0	1	4	14	44	−30	4	
Bosnia and Herzegovina	6	0	0	0	6	3	46	−43	0	

Source: IIHF

=== Results ===
All times are local (UTC+3).

3 April 2015; 13:00	North Korea	13–0 (3–0, 3–0, 7–0)	Bosnia and Herzegovina	Bornova Ice Sports Hall, İzmir; Attendance: 55

Game reference

Pak Kuk-chol
Pak Il
Goalies
Dino Pašović
Amel Capin
Referee:
(France) Geoffrey Barcelo
Linesmen:
(Turkey) Murat Aygün
(Ukraine) Anton Gladchenko

Kim S. (Ju) – 04:26	1–0
Ri C. (Kim H.) – 11:18	2–0
Kim K. (Kim S.) – 11:56	3–0
Kim N. (Kang) – 20:59	4–0
Hong (Ri C.) – 28:35	5–0
Kim C. (Kim J.) (SH) – 32:48	6–0
Kang (Kim K., Kim S.) – 41:37	7–0
Kim S. (Ju, Kang) – 43:16	8–0
Kim H. (Hong, An) – 44:38	9–0
Kim N. (SH) – 47:27	10–0
An (Kim H., Hong) – 49:27	11–0
Pak S. (Kang) – 50:30	12–0
Kim H. (Hong, An) – 57:52	13–0

6 min
Penalties
4 min
56
Shots
6

3 April 2015; 16:30	Luxembourg	15–3 (3–2, 3–1, 9–0)	Georgia	Bornova Ice Sports Hall, İzmir; Attendance: 67

Game reference

Michel Welter
Gilles Mangen
Goalies
Andrei Ilienko
Referee:
(Hungary) Gergely Kincses
Linesmen:
(Slovenia) Grega Markizeti
(Israel) Gil Haim Tichon

	0–1	10:03 – Dumbadze (G. Oganeziani)
B. Welter – 14:00	1–1
Houdremont (R. Beran) – 14:17	2–1
Schon (Sinner, Wambach) – 16:10	3–1
	3–2	17:52 – Smetanin (Tsomaia, Geperidze)
T. Beran (Schon) – 22:19	4–2
	4–3	25:02 – Dumbadze (D. Oganeziani)
B. Welter (R. Beran) – 25:15	5–3
Cannon (T. Beran) (PP) – 33:56	6–3
O. Biver (Eriksson, Wambach) – 42:09	7–3
B. Welter (Houdremont, R. Beran) – 43:00	8–3
Eriksson – 50:24	9–3
Cannon (T. Beran, Milano) – 51:36	10–3
B. Welter – 52:55	11–3
T. Beran (Milano) – 56:57	12–3
Cannon (Backes) – 57:34	13–3
Wambach (Eriksson) – 57:51	14–3
Wambach (Eriksson, G. Biver) – 58:30	15–3

2 min
Penalties
6 min
66
Shots
9

3 April 2015; 20:00	Hong Kong	8–3 (1–0, 2–2, 5–1)	United Arab Emirates	Bornova Ice Sports Hall, İzmir; Attendance: 73

Game reference

Ho King Chi King
Goalies
Ahmed Al-Dhaheri
Referee:
(China) Feng Lei
Linesmen:
(Turkey) Cemal Ersin Kaya
(Romania) Mihai Ariel Trandafir

Cheng – 07:42	1–0
	1–1	23:24 – Al-Nuami
	1–2	26:30 – A. Al-Mazrouei (Al-Blooshi) (PP)
Kan (Wong K.) – 28:19	2–2
Sham (Wong K.) (SH) – 34:42	3–2
Sham (Fung) (SH) – 42:25	4–2
Lau (Fung) – 44:18	5–2
Sham (Choi) (PP) – 50:29	6–2
Ho J. (SH) – 51:54	7–2
Lo (Cheng) – 55:12	8–2
	8–3	56:40 – A. Al-Mazrouei (PP2)

20 min
Penalties
10 min
30
Shots
18

4 April 2015; 13:00	Georgia	4–12 (2–3, 1–5, 1–4)	North Korea	Bornova Ice Sports Hall, İzmir; Attendance: 93

Game reference

Andrei Ilienko
Goalies
Pak Kuk-chol
Referee:
(Hungary) Gergely Kincses
Linesmen:
(Ukraine) Anton Gladchenko
(Turkey) Cemal Ersin Kaya

Dumbadze – 06:10	1–0
	1–1	12:04 – Hong (Ri C., Ri P.)
	1–2	12:23 – Kang (Kim K., Ju)
	1–3	18:47 – Ju (Kim S., Kim N.) (PP)
Smetanin (Geperidze) – 28:19	2–3
	2–4	20:43 – Kim H. (Ri C., Ri P.)
Geperidze (Dumbadze) (PP) – 22:15	3–4
	3–5	27:40 – An (SH)
	3–6	35:39 – Hong (Kang) (PP)
	3–7	37:52 – Kim S. (Ri P., Ju) (SH)
	3–8	38:52 – Kang
	3–9	49:02 – Kim C. (Kim M.) (PP2)
	3–10	49:34 – Kang (Pak K.) (PP)
Smetanin – 53:38	4–10
	4–11	58:06 – Ju (Kim S.)
	4–12	59:13 – Kim N.

26 min
Penalties
12 min
17
Shots
40

4 April 2015; 16:30	United Arab Emirates	2–7 (1–2, 0–2, 1–3)	Luxembourg	Bornova Ice Sports Hall, İzmir; Attendance: 115

Game reference

Khaled Al-Suwaidi
Goalies
Gilles Mangen
Referee:
(France) Geoffrey Barcelo
Linesmen:
(Turkey) Murat Aygün
(Kazakhstan) Vladimir Yefremov

	0–1	01:31 – Cannon (Backes, T. Beran)
	0–2	08:47 – Welter (R. Beran) (SH)
Al-Shamisi (Al-Blooshi, A. Al-Mazrouei) – 10:18	1–2
	1–3	26:54 – Welter (Linster, Houdremont)
	1–4	33:28 – T. Beran (Milano)
Al-Blooshi (El-Jachi) – 45:10	2–4
	2–5	48:10 – Cannon
	2–6	51:34 – R. Beran (Houdremont, Grönlund)
	2–7	55:59 – R. Beran (Houdremont) (SH)

10 min
Penalties
12 min
9
Shots
47

4 April 2015; 20:00	Turkey	11–0 (3–0, 4–0, 4–0)	Bosnia and Herzegovina	Bornova Ice Sports Hall, İzmir; Attendance: 1,583

Game reference

Levent Özbaydugan
Goalies
Dino Pašović
Referee:
(Kazakhstan) Sergei Sobolev
Linesmen:
(Slovenia) Grega Markizeti
(Israel) Gil Haim Tichon

Al. Koçoğlu – 04:41	1–0
Halil (Gümüş) – 05:00	2–0
Öztürk (Al. Koçoğlu, Karakoç) (PP) – 06:36	3–0
Gümüş – 25:23	4–0
Semiz (Özmen, Al. Koçoğlu) – 29:24	5–0
E. Coşkun (Gümüş) – 35:57	6–0
Al. Koçoğlu (Semiz) – 38:54	7–0
Al. Koçoğlu (F. Faner, E. Coşkun) (PP) – 45:40	8–0
E. Coşkun (F. Faner, Halil) – 46:01	9–0
Al. Koçoğlu – 49:43	10–0
Özmen – 54:55	11–0

28 min
Penalties
10 min
68
Shots
12

6 April 2015; 13:00	Hong Kong	8–0 (5–0, 2–0, 1–0)	Bosnia and Herzegovina	Bornova Ice Sports Hall, İzmir; Attendance: 85

Game reference

Keung Emerson Kwokway
Goalies
Dino Pašović
Amel Capin
Referee:
(Hungary) Gergely Kincses
Linesmen:
(Israel) Gil Haim Tichon
(Romania) Mihai Ariel Trandafir

Sham (Wong Y.) (PP) – 03:39	1–0
Sham (Choi, Ho J.) – 11:23	2–0
Cheng (Fung, Choi) (PP) – 16:12	3–0
To (Chim, Lau) – 17:42	4–0
Choi (Lam) (PP) – 19:35	5–0
To (Chim, Lau) – 25:48	6–0
Cheng (Fung, Lo) (PP) – 29:54	7–0
Lo – 41:53	8–0

8 min
Penalties
12 min
37
Shots
15

6 April 2015; 16:30	North Korea	7–0 (5–0, 1–0, 1–0)	United Arab Emirates	Bornova Ice Sports Hall, İzmir; Attendance: 72

Game reference

Pak Il
Goalies
Khaled Al-Suwaidi
Ahmed Al-Dhaheri
Referee:
(China) Feng Lei
Linesmen:
(Turkey) Murat Aygün
(Turkey) Cemal Ersin Kaya

Kim S. (Ju, Kim N.) – 01:53	1–0
Hong (Ri C., Kim H.) – 04:56	2–0
Kim H. (Ri P.) – 07:12	3–0
Kim H. (Hong) – 12:16	4–0
Kim H. (Ri C., Hong) – 17:11	5–0
An – 39:34	6–0
Kim N. (Ju, Pak K.) – 53:16	7–0

4 min
Penalties
6 min
40
Shots
16

6 April 2015; 20:00	Turkey	13–1 (3–0, 6–0, 4–1)	Georgia	Bornova Ice Sports Hall, İzmir; Attendance: 728

Game reference

Erol Kahraman
Goalies
Andrei Ilienko
Referee:
(Kazakhstan) Sergei Sobolev
Linesmen:
(Kazakhstan) Vladimir Yefremov
(Ukraine) Anton Gladchenko

Karakoç (B. Coşkun, An. Koçoğlu) – 11:39	1–0
Özmen (B. Coşkun) – 11:54	2–0
An. Koçoğlu (Semiz, Özmen) (PP) – 15:42	3–0
Semiz (Özmen) – 26:33	4–0
İslam (An. Koçoğlu) – 28:18	5–0
Semiz (E. Faner, Al. Koçoğlu) – 32:56	6–0
Semiz (Özmen, Al. Koçoğlu) – 33:27	7–0
Gümüş (Halil) – 38:22	8–0
Gümüş (Halil) – 39:05	9–0
Özmen (Al. Koçoğlu) – 40:41	10–0
	10–1	41:58 – Smetanin
Özmen (Öztürk) – 50:02	11–1
An. Koçoğlu (Özmen) (PP) – 56:12	12–1
Semiz (SH) – 59:47	13–1

4 min
Penalties
29 min
90
Shots
5

7 April 2015; 13:00	Bosnia and Herzegovina	0–5 (0–3, 0–1, 0–1)	Luxembourg	Bornova Ice Sports Hall, İzmir; Attendance: 61

Game reference

Amel Capin
Goalies
Gilles Mangen
Referee:
(China) Feng Lei
Linesmen:
(Turkey) Murat Aygün
(Slovenia) Grega Markizeti

0–1	08:23 – R. Beran (Houdremont, B. Welter)
0–2	15:07 – B. Welter
0–3	17:32 – Eriksson (Wambach)
0–4	30:24 – Eriksson (Wambach)
0–5	58:14 – T. Beran (PP)

20 min
Penalties
32 min
10
Shots
41

7 April 2015; 16:30	Georgia	3–11 (1–3, 1–4, 1–4)	Hong Kong	Bornova Ice Sports Hall, İzmir; Attendance: 69

Game reference

Andrei Ilienko
Kakha Ambrolava
Goalies
Ho King Chi King
Referee:
(Kazakhstan) Sergei Sobolev
Linesmen:
(Turkey) Cemal Ersin Kaya
(Romania) Mihai Ariel Trandafir

	0–1	02:36 – Lau (To)
	0–2	05:20 – Sham (Fung, Choi) (PP)
Dumbadze (Gi. Jeiranashvili, Tsukanov) (PP) – 09:37	1–2
	1–3	10:27 – Cheng
	1–4	26:50 – Choi
	1–5	26:57 – Choi (Sham)
	1–6	30:18 – Sham (Ho J.)
	1–7	35:14 – Choi (Wong Y., Sham)
Smetanin (Dumbadze) – 38:36	2–7
	2–8	42:29 – Choi (Lam, Wong P.) (EA)
Smetanin (Dumbadze) – 43:23	3–8
	3–9	46:09 – Cheng (Fung) (EA)
	3–10	50:36 – Cheng
	3–11	56:41 – Yeung (Chan)

6 min
Penalties
6 min
18
Shots
47

7 April 2015; 20:00	United Arab Emirates	0–15 (0–7, 0–3, 0–5)	Turkey	Bornova Ice Sports Hall, İzmir; Attendance: 773

Game reference

Khaled Al-Suwaidi
Goalies
Levent Özbaydugan
Erol Kahraman
Referee:
(France) Geoffrey Barcelo
Linesmen:
(Kazakhstan) Vladimir Yefremov
(Israel) Gil Haim Tichon

0–1	00:37 – Al. Koçoğlu (Semiz, Özmen)
0–2	06:56 – Gümüş (E. Coşkun, Aktürk)
0–3	10:06 – An. Koçoğlu (Karakoç)
0–4	10:21 – An. Koçoğlu (İslam)
0–5	12:43 – Halil
0–6	13:48 – Gümüş (E. Coşkun, Halil)
0–7	15:43 – Karakoç (Seçer, A. Solak)
0–8	33:18 – Al. Koçoğlu (Semiz)
0–9	33:39 – Al. Koçoğlu (Semiz, Özmen)
0–10	38:00 – A. Solak (Seçer)
0–11	45:40 – Semiz (Aktürk)
0–12	46:29 – Seçer (A. Solak, B. Coşkun)
0–13	48:55 – E. Coşkun (Halil, Gümüş)
0–14	50:33 – Karakoç (İslam, An. Koçoğlu)
0–15	59:54 – G. Solak (Semiz, Al. Koçoğlu)

8 min
Penalties
2 min
10
Shots
64

9 April 2015; 12:30	Georgia	4–1 (1–1, 0–0, 3–0)	Bosnia and Herzegovina	Bornova Ice Sports Hall, İzmir; Attendance: 83

Game reference

Andrei Ilienko
Goalies
Dino Pašović
Referee:
(China) Feng Lei
Linesmen:
(Kazakhstan) Vladimir Yefremov
(Israel) Gil Haim Tichon

Smetanin (Dumbadze) – 09:27	1–0
	1–1	10:19 – Nikulin
Dumbadze – 41:57	2–1
Tsomaia (Smetanin) – 54:02	3–1
Tsomaia (Dumbadze) – 58:55	4–1

22 min
Penalties
12 min
36
Shots
42

9 April 2015; 16:00	Turkey	10–1 (3–0, 5–1, 2–0)	Hong Kong	Bornova Ice Sports Hall, İzmir; Attendance: 745

Game reference

Levent Özbaydugan
Erol Kahraman
Goalies
Keung Emerson Kwokway
Referee:
(France) Geoffrey Barcelo
Linesmen:
(Slovenia) Grega Markizeti
(Romania) Mihai Ariel Trandafir

Al. Koçoğlu (Özmen, Aktürk) – 03:36	1–0
E. Faner (İslam) – 09:44	2–0
Gümüş (E. Coşkun) – 14:38	3–0
Karakoç (An. Koçoğlu) – 23:52	4–0
Halil (Gümüş) – 26:12	5–0
An. Koçoğlu (Gümüş, Özmen) (PP) – 28:34	6–0
	6–1	32:34 – Lau (To)
Al. Koçoğlu (SH) – 38:21	7–1
Karakoç (Al. Koçoğlu) – 38:50	8–1
Halil (E. Coşkun, Gümüş) – 51:07	9–1
E. Coşkun (G. Solak, Semiz) – 58:03	10–1

26 min
Penalties
18 min
51
Shots
13

9 April 2015; 19:30	North Korea	5–2 (1–1, 1–0, 3–1)	Luxembourg	Bornova Ice Sports Hall, İzmir; Attendance: 126

Game reference

Pak Kuk-chol
Goalies
Michel Welter
Referee:
(Hungary) Gergely Kincses
Linesmen:
(Turkey) Murat Aygün
(Ukraine) Anton Gladchenko

Hong (Ri C.) – 00:48	1–0
	1–1	01:38 – Cannon (Schon, Backes)
Pak S. (Kim K.) (PP) – 39:27	2–1
Ri C. – 46:25	3–1
	3–2	48:31 – Eriksson (Milano)
Kang (Kim K., Pak S.) (SH) – 49:49	4–2
Ri H. (Ri P., Kim C.) – 52:35	5–2

12 min
Penalties
28 min
33
Shots
20

10 April 2015; 12:30	Bosnia and Herzegovina	2–5 (0–2, 2–0, 0–3)	United Arab Emirates	Bornova Ice Sports Hall, İzmir; Attendance: 87

Game reference

Dino Pašović
Goalies
Khaled Al-Suwaidi
Referee:
(Kazakhstan) Sergei Sobolev
Linesmen:
(Slovenia) Grega Markizeti
(Romania) Mihai Ariel Trandafir

	0–1	07:26 – Al-Shamisi (Al-Jneibi, Al-Muharrami) (PP)
	0–2	18:48 – Al-Blooshi (Al-Nuami, Al-Yafeai) (PP)
Mrkva – 24:24	1–2
Mrkva (Ćatović) – 26:37	2–2
	2–3	57:06 – Al-Shamisi (Al-Saedi, M. Al-Mazrouei)
	2–4	57:52 – Al-Nuami
	2–5	59:58 – M. Al-Mazrouei (Al-Saedi) (ENG)

26 min
Penalties
10 min
25
Shots
42

10 April 2015; 16:00	Luxembourg	5–7 (2–0, 2–3, 1–4)	Turkey	Bornova Ice Sports Hall, İzmir; Attendance: 653

Game reference

Giles Mangen
Goalies
Levent Özbaydugan
Erol Kahraman
Referee:
(Hungary) Gergely Kincses
Linesmen:
(Kazakhstan) Vladimir Yefremov
(Ukraine) Anton Gladchenko

Backes (Scheier, Cannon) – 08:02	1–0
B. Welter (T. Beran, R. Beran) – 18:34	2–0
Eriksson (G. Biver, Sinner) – 21:41	3–0
	3–1	22:16 – Gümüş (E. Coşkun)
	3–2	30:13 – Halil (Al. Koçoğlu, Öztürk)
Cannon (Backes, Schon) – 30:13	4–2
	4–3	37:16 – An. Koçoğlu (PP)
	4–4	46:27 – Halil (Özmen) (SH)
T. Beran (Backes, Cannon) – 53:01	5–4
	5–5	55:04 – E. Coşkun (Halil)
	5–6	58:52 – Semiz (Gümüş, Al. Koçoğlu) (PP)
	5–7	59:14 – Semiz (Özmen)

10 min
Penalties
8 min
25
Shots
36

10 April 2015; 19:30	Hong Kong	0–9 (0–3, 0–3, 0–3)	North Korea	Bornova Ice Sports Hall, İzmir; Attendance: 73

Game reference

Ho King Chi King
Keung Emerson Kwokway
Goalies
Pak Kuk-chol
Pak Il
Referee:
(China) Feng Lei
Linesmen:
(Turkey) Cemal Ersin Kaya
(Israel) Gil Haim Tichon

0–1	00:17 – Ri C. (An)
0–2	04:37 – Hong (SH)
0–3	16:45 – Kim K. (Kim N., Ju)
0–4	20:45 – Hong
0–5	30:28 – An (Ri P.)
0–6	37:52 – Ri C. (Hong)
0–7	41:40 – Kim M. (PP)
0–8	53:17 – Jon (Kim C., Ri H.) (PP)
0–9	54:59 – Hong (Ri P.)

8 min
Penalties
28 min
13
Shots
40

12 April 2015; 11:00	United Arab Emirates	4–5 GWS (1–2, 1–0, 2–2) (OT 0–0) (SO: 0–1)	Georgia	Bornova Ice Sports Hall, İzmir; Attendance: 47

Game reference

Khaled Al-Suwaidi
Goalies
Andrei Ilienko
Referee:
(Kazakhstan) Sergei Sobolev
Linesmen:
(Kazakhstan) Vladimir Yefremov
(Romania) Mihai Ariel Trandafir

	0–1	03:20 – Dumbadze (G. Oganeziani, Smetanin)
Al-Shamisi (Al-Nuami) – 05:56	1–1
	1–2	18:00 – Dumbadze (Tsomaia, Smetanin)
El-Jachi (Al-Blooshi) – 23:22	2–2
Al-Blooshi (M. Al-Mazrouei) – 49:53	3–2
Al-Blooshi (Al-Jneibi) – 51:44	4–2
	4–3	54:11 – Smetanin (Tsomaia, Dumbadze) (SH)
	4–4	58:26 – Dumbadze

Al-Nuaimi (miss)
Al-Shamisi (miss)
M. Al-Mazrouei
Al-Blooshi (miss)
Al-Shamisi (miss)
M. Al-Mazrouei (miss)
Shootout
(miss) Smetanin
Dumbadze
(miss) Tsomaia
(miss) Dumbadze
(miss) Smetanin
Dumbadze
10 min
Penalties
10 min
26
Shots
38

12 April 2015; 14:30	Luxembourg	5–2 (2–1, 2–0, 1–1)	Hong Kong	Bornova Ice Sports Hall, İzmir; Attendance: 232

Game reference

Michel Welter
Gilles Mangen
Goalies
Ho King Chi King
Referee:
(France) Geoffrey Barcelo
Linesmen:
(Turkey) Murat Aygün
(Turkey) Cemal Ersin Kaya

Scheier (T. Beran) – 06:43	1–0
	1–1	07:39 – Leung (Wong P.)
Cannon (Grönlund, T. Beran) – 12:40	2–1
R. Beran (T. Beran, G. Biver) – 28:03	3–1
R. Beran (B. Welter, G. Biver) – 35:53	4–1
Schon (Scheier) – 42:09	5–1
	5–2	57:04 – To (Chim, Leung)

22 min
Penalties
18 min
40
Shots
17

12 April 2015; 18:00	Turkey	3–4 OT (1–2, 0–0, 2–1) (OT 0–1)	North Korea	Bornova Ice Sports Hall, İzmir; Attendance: 2,135

Game reference

Erol Kahraman
Goalies
Pak Kuk-chol
Referee:
(Hungary) Gergely Kincses
Linesmen:
(Ukraine) Anton Gladchenko
(Slovenia) Grega Markizeti

Gümüş (E. Coşkun) – 04:14	1–0
	1–1	11:26 – Ri C. (Hong)
	1–2	19:59 – Kang
Semiz (Öztürk) – 40:49	2–2
	2–3	55:38 – Hong (An) (SH)
Gümüş (An. Koçoğlu) – 57:45	3–3
	3–4	64:49 – Hong (Ri C., An) (PP)

4 min
Penalties
12 min
41
Shots
28

== Awards and statistics ==
=== Awards ===
- Best players selected by the directorate:
  - Best Goaltender: (Georgia (country)) Andrei Ilienko
  - Best Defenceman: (North Korea) Ri Pong-il
  - Best Forward: (Turkey) Alec Koçoğlu

Source: IIHF.com

=== Scoring leaders ===
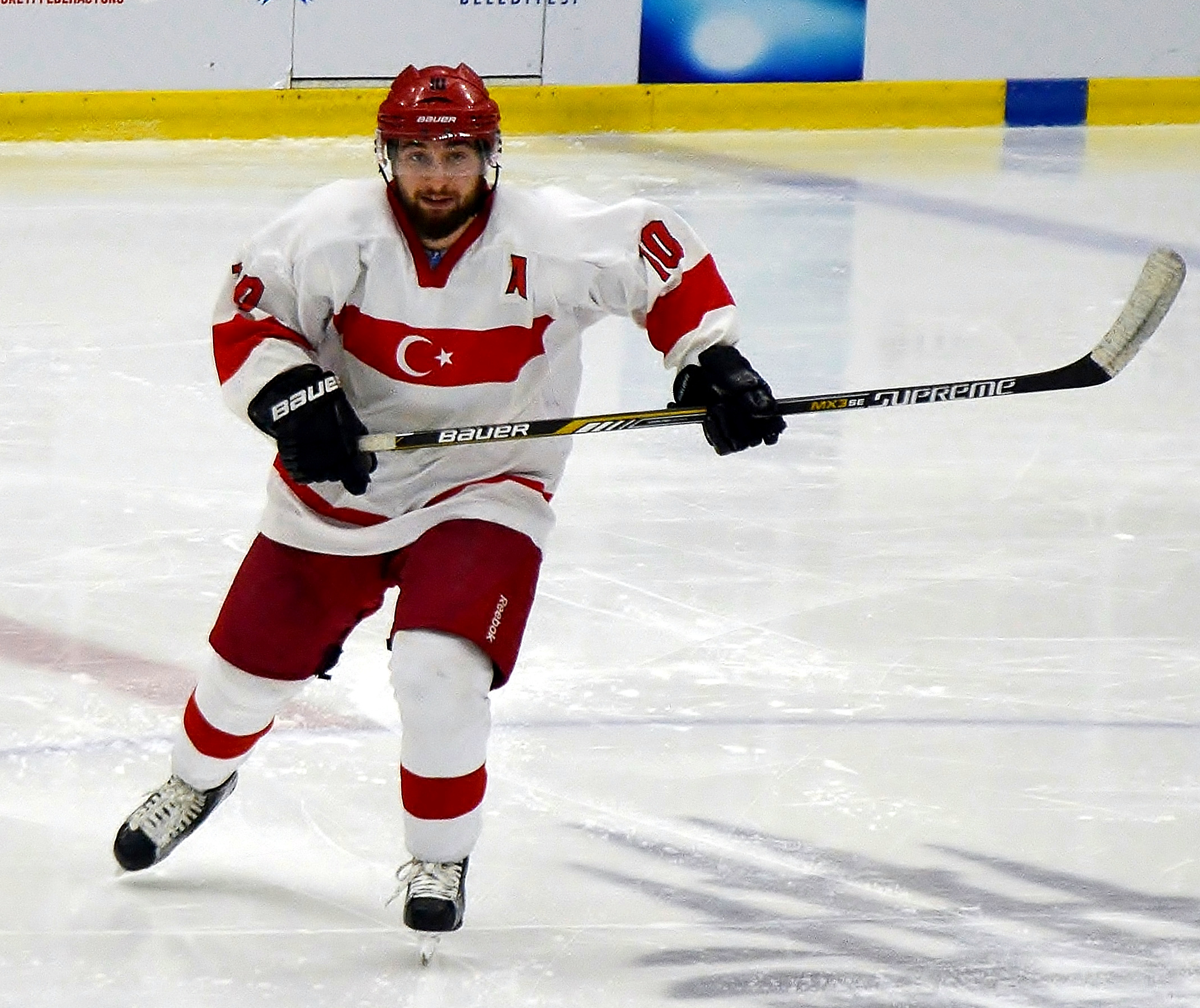
Serkan Gümüşr of Turkey finished third in scoring, with 16 points in 6 games.

List shows the top skaters sorted by points, then goals.

Player	GP	G	A	Pts	+/−	PIM	POS
(Turkey) Alec Koçoğlu	6	9	9	18	+18	2	F
(North Korea) Hong Chun-rim	6	10	7	17	+20	2	F
(Turkey) Serkan Gümüş	6	9	7	16	+15	4	F
(Turkey) Serdar Semiz	6	9	7	16	+17	0	F
(Georgia (country)) Vitali Dumbadze	6	9	6	16	−3	33	F
(Turkey) Emrah Özmen	6	4	11	15	+20	6	F
(Turkey) Yusuf Halil	6	6	6	12	+14	6	F
(Luxembourg) Thierry Beran	6	5	7	12	+4	4	F
(Turkey) Erdoğan Coşkun	6	5	7	12	+15	2	F
(North Korea) Ri Chol-min	6	5	7	12	+22	0	F

GP = Games played; G = Goals; A = Assists; Pts = Points; +/− = Plus/minus; PIM = Penalties in minutes
Source: IIHF.com

=== Goaltending leaders ===
(minimum 40% team's total ice time)

Player	TOI	GA	GAA	SA	Sv%	SO
(North Korea) Pak Il	161:09	2	0.74	28	92.86	1
(North Korea) Pak Kuk-chol	203:40	7	2.06	85	91.76	0
(Turkey) Levent Őzbaydugan	150:11	3	1.20	35	91.43	1
(Turkey) Erol Kahraman	214:38	8	2.24	58	86.21	0
(Bosnia and Herzegovina) Dino Pašović	253:43	31	7.33	209	85.17	1

TOI = Time on Ice (minutes:seconds); SA = Shots against; GA = Goals against; GAA = Goals against average; Sv% = Save percentage; SO = Shutouts
Source: IIHF.com
