= 2018 IIHF World Championship Division III =

International ice hockey tournament

Tournament details
- Host countries: South Africa; Bosnia and Herzegovina
- Venues: 2 (in 2 host cities)
- Dates: 16–22 April; 25–28 February
- Teams: 10

The 2018 IIHF World Championship Division III was an international ice hockey tournament run by the International Ice Hockey Federation. It was held in Cape Town, South Africa and the qualification tournament in Sarajevo, Bosnia and Herzegovina after the original hosts, Abu Dhabi, United Arab Emirates, withdrew their application.

Georgia won the tournament and were promoted to Division II.

Kuwait and Turkmenistan made their debut in the World Championships, with both playing in the qualification tournament. Turkmenistan won their first ever game in the World Championships, defeating the United Arab Emirates and later went on to win the qualification and be promoted to next year's Division III.

== Division III ==
2018 IIHF World Championship Division III
Tournament details
- Host country: South Africa
- Venue: 1 (in 1 host city)
- Dates: 16–22 April
- Teams: 6

Tournament statistics
- Games played: 15
- Goals scored: 117 (7.8 per game)
- Attendance: 2,225 (148 per game)
- Scoring leader: (Georgia (country)) Alexander Zhuzhunashvili (19 points)

Official website
- IIHF.com

=== Participants ===
Team	Qualification
Turkey	Placed 6th in Division II B last year and were relegated.
Bulgaria	Placed 2nd in Division III last year.
Georgia	Placed 3rd in Division III last year.
Hong Kong	Placed 4th in Division III last year.
South Africa	Host, placed 5th in Division III last year.
Chinese Taipei	Placed 6th in Division III last year.

=== Match officials ===
4 referees and 7 linesmen were selected for the tournament.

Referees

- (Romania) Zsolt Csomortani - Did not attend the championships
- (Belarus) Miroslav Iarets
- (Sweden) Richard Magnusson
- (Spain) Alexey Roshchyn

Linesmen

- (United Kingdom) Daniel Beresford
- (South Africa) Jonathan Burger
- (Italy) Matthias Cristeli
- (Austria) Maximilian Gatol
- (Belarus) Artsiom Labzov
- (Slovenia) Gregor Miklič
- (Poland) Marcin Polak

=== Standings ===
Pos	Team	Pld	W	OTW	OTL	L	GF	GA	GD	Pts	Qualification or relegation
1	Georgia (P)	5	4	0	0	1	35	12	+23	12	Promoted to 2019 Division II B
2	Bulgaria	5	3	1	0	1	28	10	+18	11	
3	Turkey	5	3	0	1	1	22	14	+8	10	
4	Chinese Taipei	5	2	0	0	3	16	25	−9	6 (Note: Chinese Taipei 5–2 South Africa)	
5	South Africa (H)	5	2	0	0	3	13	18	−5	6	
6	Hong Kong (R)	5	0	0	0	5	3	38	−35	0	Relegation to 2019 Division III qualification

Source: IIHF.com
Rules for classification: 1) points; 2) head-to-head points; 3) head-to-head goal difference; 4) head-to-head number of goals scored; 5) result against closest best-ranked team outside tied teams; 6) result against second-best ranked team outside tied teams; 7) seeding before tournament.
(H) Host; (P) Promoted; (R) Relegated

=== Results ===
All times are local (UTC+2).

16 April 2018; 13:00	Georgia	6–2 (4–1, 1–0, 1–1)	Turkey	The Ice Station, Cape Town; Attendance: 35

Game reference

Andrei Ilienko
Goalies
Muhammed Karagül
Referee:
(Spain) Alexey Roshchyn
Linesmen:
(Austria) Maximilian Gatol
(Belarus) Artsiom Labzov

	0–1	02:56 – F. Faner (Bakal)
Vasilchenko (Kharizov) – 10:11	1–1
Obolgogiani (Dumbadze) – 10:21	2–1
Zhuzhunashvili (Kurbatov, Tsomaia) (SH) – 14:37	3–1
Shvetsov (Vasilchenko, Kurbatov)(PP) – 16:14	4–1
Vasilchenko (Kozyulin, Shvetsov) – 26:12	5–1
	5–2	45:35 – F. Faner (Bakal) (SH)
Obolgogiani (Kurbatov, Zhuzhunashvili) (PP2) – 50:03	6–2

12 min
Penalties
20 min
57
Shots
17

16 April 2018; 16:15	Chinese Taipei	5–1 (0–1, 2–0, 3–0)	Hong Kong	The Ice Station, Cape Town; Attendance: 80

Game reference

Liao Yu-cheng
Goalies
King Ho
Referee:
(Belarus) Miroslav Iarets
Linesmen:
(South Africa) Jonathan Burger
(Italy) Matthias Cristeli

	0–1	05:05 – To (Lo, Fu)
Lu – 29:01	1–1
Shen Yen-c. (Pan) – 31:28	2–1
Shen Yen-l. (Lu, Shen Yen-c.) (SH) – 44:23	3–1
Tsao (Ti) – 52:11	4–1
Shen Yen-c. (Hsiao Po-yun) (SH) – 53:59	5–1

0 min
Penalties
6 min
24
Shots
22

16 April 2018; 20:00	Bulgaria	4–0 (1–0, 2–0, 1–0)	South Africa	The Ice Station, Cape Town; Attendance: 200

Game reference

Dimitar Dimitrov
Goalies
Ashley Bock
Referee:
(Sweden) Richard Magnusson
Linesmen:
(United Kingdom) Daniel Beresford
(Poland) Marcin Polak

Vasilev (Boyadjiev, V. Dikov) – 16:43	1–0
V. Dikov (Boyadjiev) – 36:33	2–0
Iskrenov (Vasilev) – 37:22	3–0
V. Dikov (Vasilev, Boyadjiev) – 58:39	4–0

6 min
Penalties
2 min
40
Shots
18

17 April 2018; 13:00	Turkey	6–1 (1–1, 2–0, 3–0)	Hong Kong	The Ice Station, Cape Town; Attendance: 20

Game reference

Tolga Bozacı
Goalies
Emerson Keung
Referee:
(Sweden) Richard Magnusson
Linesmen:
(United Kingdom) Daniel Beresford
(South Africa) Jonathan Burger

Özmen (Semiz, Solak) – 00:38	1–0
	1–1	16:52 – Sham (Tang, Ho) (PP2)
Kavaz (Bingöl, Aktürk) – 27:40	2–1
Semiz (Ö. Kars) – 32:39	3–1
Özmen (Semiz) (PP) – 41:53	4–1
Toygar (E. Faner) – 44:01	5–1
Bakal (PP) – 51:49	6–1

8 min
Penalties
10 min
51
Shots
13

17 April 2018; 16:15	Bulgaria	3–5 (2–1, 0–3, 1–1)	Georgia	The Ice Station, Cape Town; Attendance: 60

Game reference

Dimitar Dimitrov
Goalies
Andrei Ilienko
Referee:
(Belarus) Miroslav Iarets
Linesmen:
(Italy) Matthias Cristeli
(Belarus) Artsiom Labzov

	0–1	04:05 – Kurbatov (Obolgogiani, Zhuzhunashvili) (PP)
V. Dikov (Vasilev) – 10:01	1–1
M. Nikolov (D. Dilkov) – 18:28	2–1
	2–2	28:18 – Kozyulin (Vasilchenko)
	2–3	36:24 – Vasilchenko (SH)
	2–4	36:35 – Vasilchenko (Kozyulin) (SH)
	2–5	44:48 – Kozyulin
Hodulov (V. Dikov) (PP2) – 52:24	3–5

20 min
Penalties
16 min
43
Shots
37

17 April 2018; 20:00	South Africa	2–5 (0–1, 1–2, 1–2)	Chinese Taipei	The Ice Station, Cape Town; Attendance: 180

Game reference

Charl Pretorius
Goalies
Liao Yu-cheng
Referee:
(Spain) Alexey Roshchyn
Linesmen:
(Austria) Maximilian Gatol
(Slovenia) Gregor Miklič

	0–1	06:20 – Shen Yen-c. (Hsiao Po-yun)
	0–2	28:08 – Tien
Magmoed (Botha) – 30:31	1–2
	1–3	35:10 – Shen Yen-c. (Hsiao Po-yuan)
	1–4	43:40 – Tang (Tsao) (PP)
	1–5	50:01 – Hsiao Po-yun (Shen Yen-c., Hsiao Po-yuan)
Magmoed (Van Doesburgh, Compton) (PP) – 57:16	2–5

18 min
Penalties
4 min
17
Shots
22

19 April 2018; 13:00	Bulgaria	7–2 (1–1, 4–0, 2–1)	Chinese Taipei	The Ice Station, Cape Town; Attendance: 30

Game reference

Dimitar Dimitrov
Goalies
Liao Yu-cheng
David Chang
Referee:
(Sweden) Richard Magnusson
Linesmen:
(South Africa) Jonathan Burger
(Poland) Marcin Polak

D. Dilkov (Gatchev) – 12:27	1–0
	1–1	17:44 – Hsiao Po-yun (Lu, Shen Yen-c.)
Georgiev (Muhachev) (PP) – 26:24	2–1
Boyadjiev – 27:40	3–1
D. Dilkov (M. Nikolov, Gatchev) (PP) – 29:01	4–1
Hodulov (Georgiev, Iskrenov) (PP) – 38:51	5–1
	5–2	49:08 – Pan (Hung, Lu)
Hodulov (Georgiev) – 52:22	6–2
Boyadjiev – 53:37	7–2

6 min
Penalties
8 min
39
Shots
19

19 April 2018; 16:15	Georgia	11–1 (5–1, 3–0, 3–0)	Hong Kong	The Ice Station, Cape Town; Attendance: 40

Game reference

Andrei Ilienko
Kakha Ambrolava
Goalies
Emerson Keung
King Ho
Referee:
(Spain) Alexey Roshchyn
Linesmen:
(United Kingdom) Daniel Beresford
(Slovenia) Gregor Miklič

Shvetsov (Kozyulin, Vasilchenko) – 10:30	1–0
Zhuzhunashvili (Geperidze) (SH) – 12:02	2–0
Zhuzhunashvili (SH2) – 12:59	3–0
	3–1	16:09 – Fung (J. Ho)
Zhuzhunashvili (Dumbadze) – 16:22	4–1
Zhuzhunashvili (Obolgogiani, Shvetsov) – 16:37	5–1
Obolgogiani (Zhuzhunashvili, Dumbadze) – 24:10	6–1
Zhuzhunashvili (Shalunov, Obolgogiani) – 30:25	7–1
Obolgogiani (Zhuzhunashvili) (SH) – 34:13	8–1
Obolgogiani (Zhuzhunashvili) – 42:15	9–1
Obolgogiani (G. Oganeziani, Zhuzhunashvili) – 46:00	10–1
Shalunov ( D. Oganeziani, Vasilchenko) – 50:22	11–1

10 min
Penalties
10 min
61
Shots
13

19 April 2018; 20:00	Turkey	7–1 (1–0, 4–1, 2–0)	South Africa	The Ice Station, Cape Town; Attendance: 250

Game reference

Muhammed Karagül
Goalies
Ashley Bock
Charl Pretorius
Referee:
(Belarus) Miroslav Iarets
Linesmen:
(Austria) Maximilian Gatol
(Belarus) Artsiom Labzov

Kavaz (Ö. Kars) – 02:01	1–0
F. Faner (Bakal, Y. Kars) (PP) – 24:19	2–0
Savaş (Semiz, Solak) – 26:01	3–0
Kavaz (Bingöl) – 28:31	4–0
Inanç (Y. Kars) – 35:49	5–0
	5–1	38:38 – Giot (Bremner)
Özmen (Semiz) – 40:53	6–1
E. Faner (Y. Kars) – 52:25	7–1

6 min
Penalties
12 min
34
Shots
36

20 April 2018; 13:00	Hong Kong	0–10 (0–3, 0–3, 0–4)	Bulgaria	The Ice Station, Cape Town; Attendance: 20

Game reference

King Ho
Goalies
Ivan Stoynov
Referee:
(Spain) Alexei Roshchyn
Linesmen:
(United Kingdom) Danny Beresford
(Italy) Matthias Cristeli

0–1	09:47 – Gatchev (Dilkov, M. Nikolov)
0–2	16:28 – Dilkov (Stoilov, Gatchev) (PP)
0–3	18:18 – Nikolov (Dilkov)
0–4	29:33 – Hodulov (Iskrenov, Muhachev)
0–5	35:33 – Iskrenov (Muhachev, Bozhanov)
0–6	38:46 – Boyadjiev (T. Georgiev) (SH)
0–7	48:09 – Hodulov (Iskrenov, Vasilev)
0–8	48:32 – Stoyadinov (Hodulov, K. Dikov)
0–9	49:18 – Stoyadinov (Boyadjiev)
0–10	53:09 – Nikolov (Dilkov) (SH)

10 min
Penalties
14 min
17
Shots
51

20 April 2018; 16:15	Chinese Taipei	2–4 (1–0, 1–1, 0–3)	Turkey	The Ice Station, Cape Town; Attendance: 30

Game reference

Liao Yu-cheng
Goalies
Muhammed Karagül
Referee:
(Belarus) Miroslav Iarets
Linesmen:
(South Africa) Jonathan Mark Burger
(Poland) Marcin Polak

Yang (Hung) – 04:07	1–0
	1–1	26:53 – Takar (Inanç)
Shen Yen-c. (Chang) – 38:35	2–1
	2–2	26:53 – Semiz (PP)
	2–3	44:07 – Bakal (Solak)
	2–4	48:21 – Bakal (Elakaş)

20 min
Penalties
6 min
20
Shots
36

20 April 2018; 20:00	South Africa	4–2 (2–1, 0–1, 2–0)	Georgia	The Ice Station, Cape Town; Attendance: 700

Game reference

Charl Pretorius
Goalies
Andrei Ilienko
Referee:
(Sweden) Richard Magnusson
Linesmen:
(Belarus) Artsiom Labzov
(Slovenia) Gregor Miklič

	0–1	04:25 – Obolgogiani (Zhuzhunashvili)
Carelse (Samaai) – 08:16	1–1
Cardoso (Magmoed) (PP) – 19:28	2–1
	2–2	24:23 – Obolgogiani (Zhuzhunashvili)
Magmoed (Giot, Van Doesburgh) (PP) – 52:02	3–2
Van Doesburgh (Samaai) (ENG, SH) – 59:41	4–2

10 min
Penalties
33 min
33
Shots
52

22 April 2018; 13:00	Georgia	11–2 (5–1, 3–0, 3–1)	Chinese Taipei	The Ice Station, Cape Town; Attendance: 100

Game reference

Andrei Ilienko
Kakha Ambrolava
Goalies
Liao Yu-cheng
David Chang
Referee:
(Spain) Alexey Roshchyn
Linesmen:
(Austria) Maximilian Gatol
(Belarus) Artsiom Labzov

Zhuzhunashvili (Obolgogiani) – 00:17	1–0
Kurbatov (Zhuzhunashvili, Kozyulin) – 04:47	2–0
	2–1	08:23 – Shen Yen-l. (Lu) (PP)
Kharizov (SH) – 11:51	3–1
Shvetsov (Obolgogiani, Kharizov) – 15:03	4–1
Vasilchenko (Kharizov) – 19:48	5–1
Shalunov (Vasilchenko, Kharizov) (PP) – 22:20	6–1
Zhuzhunashvili (Kozyulin, Kurbatov) – 22:46	7–1
Kharizov (Vasilchenko) – 22:53	8–1
Kharizov (Obolgogiani, Kurbatov) – 48:47	9–1
Zhuzhunashvili (Kurbatov, Jeiranashvili) – 51:27	10–1
	10–2	58:09 – Hsiao Po-yuan (Chang W.)
Zhuzhunashvili (Kozyulin, Vasilchenko) (SH) – 59:56	11–2

33 min
Penalties
10 min
56
Shots
17

22 April 2018; 16:15	Turkey	3–4 OT (2–2, 1–0, 0–1); OT: (0–1)	Bulgaria	The Ice Station, Cape Town; Attendance: 80

Game reference

Muhammed Karagül
Goalies
Dimitar Dimitrov
Referee:
(Belarus) Miroslav Iarets
Linesmen:
(United Kingdom) Daniel Beresford
(Poland) Marcin Polak

	0–1	04:38 – Iskrenov (Hodulov)
	0–2	06:01 – V. Dikov (Gatchev)
E. Faner (Özmen, Semiz) – 11:59	1–2
E. Faner (Bakal, Y. Kars) (PP) – 14:16	2–2
Ö. Kars (Bakal) – 33:03	3–2
	3–3	58:50 – Boyadjiev (Hodulov) (ENG, EA)
	3–4	62:52 – D. Dikov (V. Dikov)

12 min
Penalties
2 min
34
Shots
38

22 April 2018; 20:00	Hong Kong	0–6 (0–0, 0–4, 0–2)	South Africa	The Ice Station, Cape Town; Attendance: 400

Game reference

Emerson Keung
Goalies
Charl Pretorius
Referee:
(Sweden) Richard Magnusson
Linesmen:
(Italy) Matthias Cristeli
(Slovenia) Gregor Miklič

0–1	23:54 – Samaai (Marais) (PP)
0–2	27:07 – Bremner (Samaai, Carelse)
0–3	33:48 – Samaai (Marais)
0–4	37:59 – Van Doesburgh (Carelse)
0–5	45:38 – Valadas (Compton, Malgas)
0–6	50:41 – Giot (Marais, Van Doesburgh)

8 min
Penalties
4 min
20
Shots
60

=== Awards and statistics ===
==== Awards ====
- Best players selected by the directorate:
  - Best Goaltender: (South Africa) Charl Pretorius
  - Best Defenceman: (Bulgaria) Martin Boyadjiev
  - Best Forward: (Georgia (country)) Aleksandr Zhuzhunashvili

Source: IIHF.com

==== Scoring leaders ====
Player	GP	G	A	Pts	+/−	PIM	POS
(Georgia (country)) Aleksandr Zhuzhunashvili	5	10	9	19	+15	2	F
(Georgia (country)) Oliver Obolgogiani	5	8	6	14	+16	6	F
(Georgia (country)) Alexander Vasilchenko	5	5	7	12	+7	8	F
(Bulgaria) Ivan Hodulov	5	5	3	8	+2	4	F
(Chinese Taipei) Shen Yen-chin	5	5	3	8	–3	0	F
(Bulgaria) Martin Boyadjiev	5	4	4	8	+8	2	F
(Bulgaria) Daniel Dilkov	5	4	4	8	+7	0	F
(Turkey) Ferhat Bakal	5	3	5	8	+3	2	F
(Georgia (country)) Artem Kozyulin	5	2	6	8	+9	25	F
(Georgia (country)) Artem Kurbatov	5	2	6	8	+16	10	D

GP = Games played; G = Goals; A = Assists; Pts = Points; +/− = Plus/minus; PIM = Penalties in minutes; POS = Position
Source: IIHF.com

==== Goaltending leaders ====
Only the top five goaltenders, based on save percentage, who have played at least 40% of their team's minutes, are included in this list.

Player	TOI	GA	GAA	SA	Sv%	SO
(Turkey) Muhammed Karagül	242:52	13	3.21	161	91.93	0
(South Africa) Charl Pretorius	204:11	9	2.64	111	91.89	1
(Georgia (country)) Andrei Ilienko	283:39	10	2.12	115	91.30	0
(Bulgaria) Dimitar Dimitrov	242:28	10	2.47	107	90.65	1
(Chinese Taipei) Liao Yu-cheng	265:54	18	4.06	137	86.86	0

TOI = Time on ice (minutes:seconds); SA = Shots against; GA = Goals against; GAA = Goals against average; Sv% = Save percentage; SO = Shutouts
Source: IIHF.com

== Division III qualification tournament ==
2018 IIHF World Championship Division III qualification tournament
Tournament details
- Host country: Bosnia and Herzegovina
- Venue: 1 (in 1 host city)
- Dates: 25–28 February
- Teams: 4

Tournament statistics
- Games played: 6
- Goals scored: 68 (11.33 per game)
- Attendance: 3,020 (503 per game)
- Scoring leader: (Turkmenistan) Ahmet Gurbanov (12 points)

Official website
- IIHF.com

=== Participants ===
Team	Qualification
Bosnia and Herzegovina	Host, withdrew from tournament last year. Last played in 2016.
United Arab Emirates	Placed 7th in Division III last year and were relegated.
Kuwait	First time participating in tournament.
Turkmenistan	First time participating in tournament.

=== Match officials ===
3 referees and 4 linesmen were selected for the tournament.

Referees

- (Denmark) Martin Christensen
- (United Kingdom) Stefan Hogarth
- (Poland) Paweł Meszyński

Linesmen

- (Czech Republic) Tomáš Brejcha
- (Ukraine) Ilya Khohlov
- (Republic of Ireland) Vytautas Lukoševičius
- (Belgium) Maarten van der Acker

=== Standings ===
Pos	Team	Pld	W	OTW	OTL	L	GF	GA	GD	Pts	Qualification
1	Turkmenistan (P)	3	3	0	0	0	41	5	+36	9	Promoted to 2019 Division III
2	Bosnia and Herzegovina (H)	3	2	0	0	1	17	15	+2	6	
3	United Arab Emirates	3	1	0	0	2	5	12	−7	3	
4	Kuwait	3	0	0	0	3	5	36	−31	0	

Source: IIHF.com
Rules for classification: 1) points; 2) head-to-head points; 3) head-to-head goal difference; 4) head-to-head number of goals scored; 5) result against closest best-ranked team outside tied teams; 6) result against second-best ranked team outside tied teams; 7) seeding before tournament.
(H) Host; (P) Promoted

=== Results ===
All times are local (UTC+1).

25 February 2018; 16:00	Turkmenistan	4–0 (0–0, 1–0, 3–0)	United Arab Emirates	Zetra Olympic Hall, Sarajevo; Attendance: 100

Game reference

Keremli Charyyev
Goalies
Khaled Al-Suwaidi
Referee:
(Denmark) Martin Christensen
Linesmen:
(Ukraine) Ilya Khohlov
(Belgium) Maarten van der Acker

Veleyev (Aganiyazov, Vahovskiy) (PP) – 34:58	1–0
Aganiyazov (Vahovskiy, Hydyrov) (PP) – 40:55	2–0
Soyunov – 44:39	3–0
Geldimyradov (Savin, Barkovskiy) (PP) – 56:58	4–0

8 min
Penalties
12 min
43
Shots
10

25 February 2018; 20:00	Kuwait	1–8 (0–2, 0–3, 1–3)	Bosnia and Herzegovina	Zetra Olympic Hall, Sarajevo; Attendance: 1,100

Game reference

Jasem Al-Sarraf
Goalies
Edis Pribišić
Referee:
(United Kingdom) Stefan Hogarth
Linesmen:
(Czech Republic) Tomáš Brejcha
(Republic of Ireland) Vytautas Lukoševičius

	0–1	03:27 – Čordalija (PP)
	0–2	15:28 – Čordalija (Logo)
	0–3	28:00 – Lemeš (Omer, Arslanagic) (PP)
	0–4	30:15 – Omer (PP)
	0–5	37:46 – Lemeš (Omer) (PP2)
	0–6	42:18 – Velić (Čordalija)
	0–7	45:18 – Logo (SH)
	0–8	47:03 – Omer (Tokić)
H. Al-Ajmi – 56:37	1–8

45 min
Penalties
14 min
16
Shots
41

26 February 2018; 16:00	Kuwait	2–24 (0–8, 0–7, 2–9)	Turkmenistan	Zetra Olympic Hall, Sarajevo; Attendance: 110

Game reference

Jasem Al-Sarraf
Dhari Al-Omran
Goalies
Keremli Charyyev
Rahman Myradov
Referee:
(Poland) Paweł Meszyński
Linesmen:
(Ukraine) Ilya Khohlov
(Republic of Ireland) Vytautas Lukoševičius

	0–1	01:30 – Soyunov (Geldimyradov, Barkovskiy)
	0–2	06:02 – Gurbanov (Aganiyazov)
	0–3	10:11 – Geldimyradov
	0–4	11:49 – Vahovskiy (Gurbanov, Soyunov) (EA)
	0–5	12:37 – Gurbanov (Aganiyazov)
	0–6	16:46 – Geldimyradov (Barkovskiy)
	0–7	18:35 – Vahovskiy (Gurbanov, Aganiyazov) (SH)
	0–8	18:55 – Soyunov (SH)
	0–9	27:41 – Gurbanov (Vahovskiy, Veleyev)
	0–10	28:33 – Veleyev (Aganiyazov)
	0–11	33:01 – Soyunov (Geldimyradov)
	0–12	33:56 – Avdeyev (Kuliyev, Atayev)
	0–13	37:57 – Vahovskiy (Aganiyazov, Gurbanov) (PP)
	0–14	39:30 – Geldimyradov (Barkovskiy, Soyunov)
	0–15	39:51 – Berdiyev (Veliyev)
	0–16	42:47 – Avdeyev (Dovletmyradov) (PP)
A. Al-Ajmi (Al-Maragi) – 43:22	1–16
	1–17	43:37 – Gurbanov (Aganiyazov)
Al-Zidan (Al-Maghrabi) (SH) – 44:35	2–17
	2–18	45:56 – Veleyev
	2–19	47:21 – Avdeyev (Atayev)
	2–20	51:02 – Kuliyev (Barkovskiy, Savin) (PP2)
	2–21	54:13 – Hydyrov (Vahovskiy)
	2–22	55:12 – Savin (Kuliyev, Gayer) (PP)
	2–23	57:01 – Veleyev (Vahovskiy, Gurbanov)
	2–24	57:47 – Barkovskiy (Gayer)

16 min
Penalties
27 min
11
Shots
67

26 February 2018; 20:00	United Arab Emirates	1–6 (0–1, 1–2, 0–3)	Bosnia and Herzegovina	Zetra Olympic Hall, Sarajevo; Attendance: 600

Game reference

Khaled Al-Suwaidi
Goalies
Edis Pribišić
Referee:
(Denmark) Martin Christensen

	0–1	04:48 – Hadžihasanović (Omer, Ramić)
Al-Dhaheri (M. Al-Shamsi) – 26:55	1–1
	1–2	31:51 – Čordalija (Arslanagic) (SH)
	1–3	33:50 – Omer (Bakal, Pribišić) (PP)
	1–4	46:47 – Čordalija
	1–5	52:29 – Čordalija
	1–6	53:39 – Omer

22 min
Penalties
34 min
27
Shots
42

28 February 2018; 09:00	United Arab Emirates	4–2 (1–1, 1–0, 2–1)	Kuwait	Zetra Olympic Hall, Sarajevo; Attendance: 110

Game reference

Khaled Al-Suwaidi
Goalies
Jasem Al-Sarraf
Referee:
(United Kingdom) Stefan Hogarth
Linesmen:
(Republic of Ireland) Vytautas Lukoševičius
(Belgium) Maarten van den Acker

	0–1	07:43 – Al-Awadhi (Y. Al-Kandari, Al-Maraghy)
Al-Dhaheri (M. Al-Shamsi, Al-Harmoodi) (PP) – 13:30	1–1
Al-Dhaheri (Al-Mehairbi, O. Al-Shamsi) (PP) – 39:16	2–1
O. Al-Shamsi (A. Al-Haddad, H. Al-Haddad) – 43:02	3–1
Al-Dhaheri (A. Yahya, M. Al-Shamsi) – 50:48	4–1
	4–2	57:35 – Al-Maragi (A. Al-Ajmi, M. Al-Ajmi) (PP, EA)

4 min
Penalties
12 min
20
Shots
22

28 February 2018; 20:30	Bosnia and Herzegovina	3–13 (3–1, 0–5, 0–7)	Turkmenistan	Zetra Olympic Hall, Sarajevo; Attendance: 1,000

Game reference

Edis Pribišić
Muamer Tahirbegović
Goalies
Keremli Charyyev
Referee:
(Poland) Paweł Meszyński
Linesmen:
(Czech Republic) Tomáš Brejcha
(Ukraine) Ilya Khohlov

Omer (Hadžihasanović) – 04:28	1–0
Lemeš (Omer, Hadžihasanović) – 06:04	2–0
	2–1	07:50 – Soyunov (Barkovskiy) (PP)
Rakić (Omer) – 11:40	3–1
	3–2	24:38 – Gurbanov (SH)
	3–3	26:17 – Gurbanov (Vahovskiy)
	3–4	31:06 – Aganiyazov (Gurbanov) (PP)
	3–5	33:19 – Savin (SH)
	3–6	37:32 – Geldimyradov (Barkovskiy) (PP)
	3–7	41:27 – Barkovskiy
	3–8	45:12 – Gayer (Savin, Barkovskiy) (PP)
	3–9	49:03 – Veleyev (Hydyrov) (PP2)
	3–10	49:19 – Soyunov (Geldimyradov, Gayer) (PP)
	3–11	52:38 – Vahovskiy (Gurbanov)
	3–12	57:06 – Barkovskiy (Geldimyradov, Soyunov)
	3–13	57:36 – Dovletmyradov (Kuliyev)

44 min
Penalties
18 min
16
Shots
66

=== Awards and statistics ===
==== Awards ====
- Best players selected by the directorate:
  - Best Goaltender: (Bosnia and Herzegovina) Edis Pribišić
  - Best Defenceman: (Turkmenistan) Dmitriy Savin
  - Best Forward: (Turkmenistan) Ahmet Gurbanov

Source: IIHF.com

=== Scoring leaders ===
Player	GP	G	A	Pts	+/−	PIM	POS
(Turkmenistan) Ahmet Gurbanov	3	6	6	12	+10	9	F
(Turkmenistan) Pavel Barkovskiy	3	3	8	11	+9	2	F
(Bosnia and Herzegovina) Mirza Omer	3	5	5	10	+7	20	F
(Turkmenistan) Aleksandr Vahovskiy	3	4	6	10	+10	0	F
(Turkmenistan) Dovlet Soyunov	3	6	3	9	+10	2	F
(Turkmenistan) Arslan Geldimyradov	3	5	4	9	+9	2	F
(Turkmenistan) Amangeldi Aganiyazov	3	2	7	9	+10	4	D
(Bosnia and Herzegovina) Dino Čordalija	3	5	1	6	+6	6	F
(Turkmenistan) Ishan Veleyev	3	5	1	6	+6	0	F
(Turkmenistan) Dmitriy Savin	3	2	3	5	+8	4	D

GP = Games played; G = Goals; A = Assists; Pts = Points; +/− = Plus/minus; PIM = Penalties in minutes; POS = Position
Source: IIHF.com

=== Goaltending leaders ===
Only the top five goaltenders, based on save percentage, who have played at least 40% of their team's minutes, are included in this list.

Player	TOI	GA	GAA	SA	Sv%	SO
(Turkmenistan) Keremli Charyyev	140:00	3	1.29	29	89.66	1
(United Arab Emirates) Khaled Al-Suwaidi	180:00	12	4.00	107	88.79	0
(Bosnia and Herzegovina) Edis Pribišić	169:19	12	4.25	97	87.63	0
(Kuwait) Jasem Al-Sarraf	154:43	25	9.70	98	74.49	0

TOI = Time on ice (minutes:seconds); SA = Shots against; GA = Goals against; GAA = Goals against average; Sv% = Save percentage; SO = Shutouts
Source: IIHF.com
