= 2027 Men's Ice Hockey World Championships =

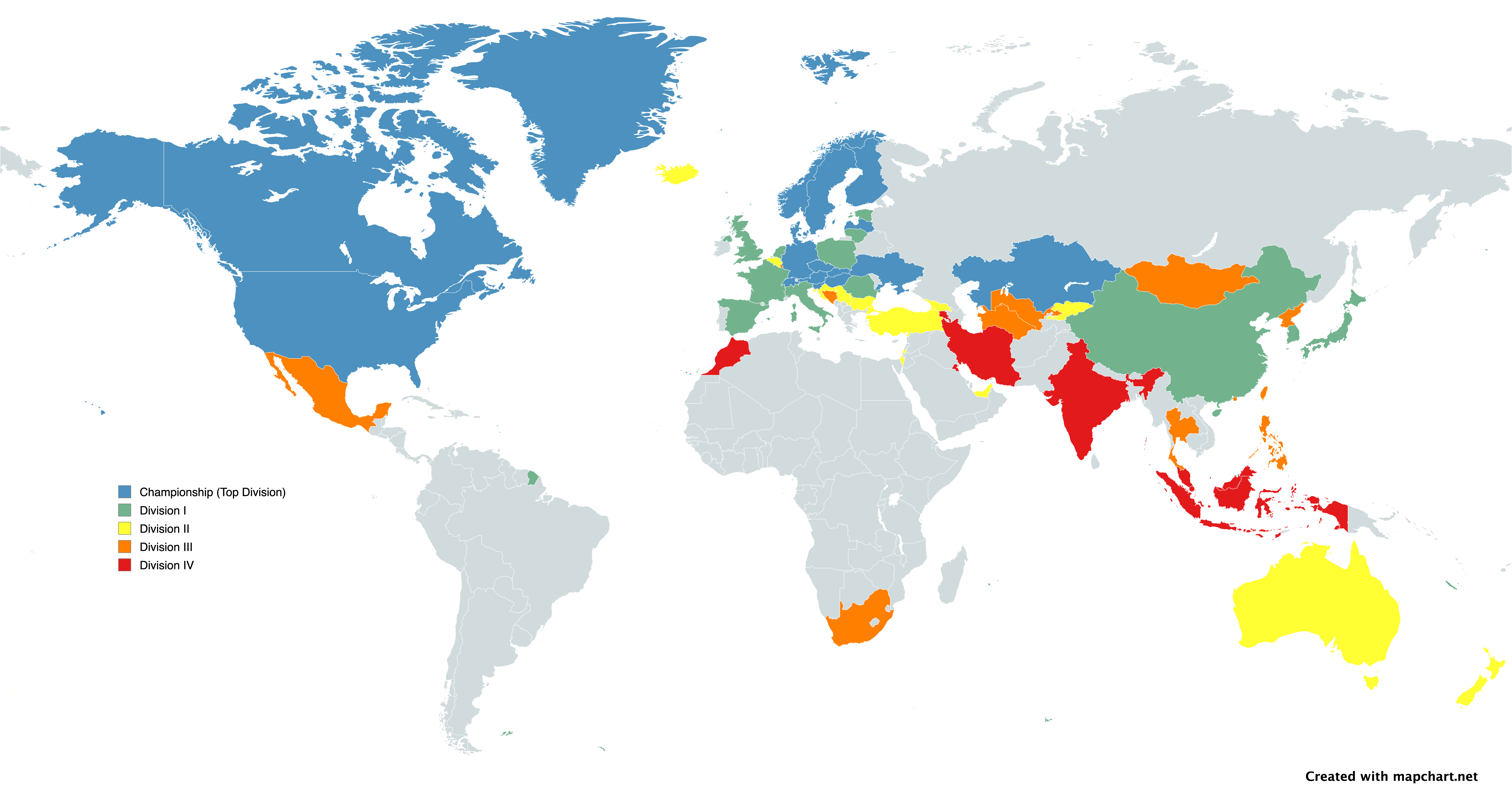
Map of the countries participating at the 2027 IIHF World Championships

The 2027 Men's Ice Hockey World Championships will be the 90th such event hosted by the International Ice Hockey Federation. Teams will participate at several levels of competition based on their 2026 results. The competition will also serve as qualifications for division placements in the 2028 edition.

For the first time since 2021, Russia is supposed to compete as the Court of Arbitration for Sport (CAS) ordered the IIHF to allow Russia to enter the tournament, despite the IIHF's objections.

All lower divisions will play their tournament with two groups, a knockout stage and the winner of the final to be promoted. The last-placed teams of each group will play a two-game series to determine the relegated team.

== Championship (Top Division) ==
The tournament will be held in Düsseldorf, Gelsenkirchen and Mannheim, Germany, from 13 to 30 May 2027.

=== Group A ===
| Pos | Team | Pld | W | OTW | OTL | L | GF | GA | GD | Pts | Qualification or relegation |
|---|---|---|---|---|---|---|---|---|---|---|---|
| 1 | Switzerland | 0 | 0 | 0 | 0 | 0 | 0 | 0 | 0 | 0 | Quarterfinals |
| 1 | Finland | 0 | 0 | 0 | 0 | 0 | 0 | 0 | 0 | 0 | Quarterfinals |
| 1 | Sweden | 0 | 0 | 0 | 0 | 0 | 0 | 0 | 0 | 0 | Quarterfinals |
| 1 | Germany (H) | 0 | 0 | 0 | 0 | 0 | 0 | 0 | 0 | 0 | Quarterfinals |
| 1 | Latvia | 0 | 0 | 0 | 0 | 0 | 0 | 0 | 0 | 0 | Qualified for the 2028 IIHF World Championship |
| 1 | Austria | 0 | 0 | 0 | 0 | 0 | 0 | 0 | 0 | 0 | Qualified for the 2028 IIHF World Championship |
| 1 | Slovenia | 0 | 0 | 0 | 0 | 0 | 0 | 0 | 0 | 0 | Qualified for the 2028 IIHF World Championship |
| 1 | Ukraine | 0 | 0 | 0 | 0 | 0 | 0 | 0 | 0 | 0 | Relegated to the 2028 Division I A |

First match(es) will be played: 13 May 2027. Source:
Rules for classification: 1) points; 2) head-to-head points; 3) head-to-head goal difference; 4) head-to-head number of goals scored; 5) result against closest best-ranked team outside tied teams; 6) result against second-best-ranked team outside tied teams; 7) seeding before tournament
(H) Host

=== Group B ===
| Pos | Team | Pld | W | OTW | OTL | L | GF | GA | GD | Pts | Qualification or relegation |
|---|---|---|---|---|---|---|---|---|---|---|---|
| 1 | Canada | 0 | 0 | 0 | 0 | 0 | 0 | 0 | 0 | 0 | Quarterfinals |
| 1 | United States | 0 | 0 | 0 | 0 | 0 | 0 | 0 | 0 | 0 | Quarterfinals |
| 1 | Czechia | 0 | 0 | 0 | 0 | 0 | 0 | 0 | 0 | 0 | Quarterfinals |
| 1 | Slovakia | 0 | 0 | 0 | 0 | 0 | 0 | 0 | 0 | 0 | Quarterfinals |
| 1 | Denmark | 0 | 0 | 0 | 0 | 0 | 0 | 0 | 0 | 0 | Qualified for the 2028 IIHF World Championship |
| 1 | Norway | 0 | 0 | 0 | 0 | 0 | 0 | 0 | 0 | 0 | Qualified for the 2028 IIHF World Championship |
| 1 | Kazakhstan | 0 | 0 | 0 | 0 | 0 | 0 | 0 | 0 | 0 | Qualified for the 2028 IIHF World Championship |
| 1 | Hungary | 0 | 0 | 0 | 0 | 0 | 0 | 0 | 0 | 0 | Relegated to the 2028 Division I A |

First match(es) will be played: 14 May 2027. Source:
Rules for classification: 1) points; 2) head-to-head points; 3) head-to-head goal difference; 4) head-to-head number of goals scored; 5) result against closest best-ranked team outside tied teams; 6) result against second-best-ranked team outside tied teams; 7) seeding before tournament

=== Bracket ===
Quarter-finals
27 May
1A
4B
27 May
1B
4A
27 May
2A
3B
27 May
2B
3A

Semi-finals
29 May
29 May

Final
30 May
Third place
30 May

=== Final standings ===
Teams finishing fifth in the preliminary round will be ranked ninth and tenth, teams finishing sixth were ranked 11th and 12th, and so on.

| Pos | Grp | Team | Pld | W | OTW | OTL | L | GF | GA | GD | Pts | Final Result |
|---|---|---|---|---|---|---|---|---|---|---|---|---|
| 1 | | TBD | 0 | 0 | 0 | 0 | 0 | 0 | 0 | 0 | 0 | Champions |
| 2 | | TBD | 0 | 0 | 0 | 0 | 0 | 0 | 0 | 0 | 0 | Runners-up |
| 3 | | TBD | 0 | 0 | 0 | 0 | 0 | 0 | 0 | 0 | 0 | Third place |
| 4 | | TBD | 0 | 0 | 0 | 0 | 0 | 0 | 0 | 0 | 0 | Fourth place |
| 5 | | TBD | 0 | 0 | 0 | 0 | 0 | 0 | 0 | 0 | 0 | Eliminated in Quarterfinals |
| 6 | | TBD | 0 | 0 | 0 | 0 | 0 | 0 | 0 | 0 | 0 | Eliminated in Quarterfinals |
| 7 | | TBD | 0 | 0 | 0 | 0 | 0 | 0 | 0 | 0 | 0 | Eliminated in Quarterfinals |
| 8 | | TBD | 0 | 0 | 0 | 0 | 0 | 0 | 0 | 0 | 0 | Eliminated in Quarterfinals |
| 9 | | TBD | 0 | 0 | 0 | 0 | 0 | 0 | 0 | 0 | 0 | Eliminated in Preliminary round |
| 10 | | TBD | 0 | 0 | 0 | 0 | 0 | 0 | 0 | 0 | 0 | Eliminated in Preliminary round |
| 11 | | TBD | 0 | 0 | 0 | 0 | 0 | 0 | 0 | 0 | 0 | Eliminated in Preliminary round |
| 12 | | TBD | 0 | 0 | 0 | 0 | 0 | 0 | 0 | 0 | 0 | Eliminated in Preliminary round |
| 13 | | TBD | 0 | 0 | 0 | 0 | 0 | 0 | 0 | 0 | 0 | Eliminated in Preliminary round |
| 14 | | TBD | 0 | 0 | 0 | 0 | 0 | 0 | 0 | 0 | 0 | Eliminated in Preliminary round |
| 15 | | TBD | 0 | 0 | 0 | 0 | 0 | 0 | 0 | 0 | 0 | Relegated to 2028 Division I A |
| 16 | | TBD | 0 | 0 | 0 | 0 | 0 | 0 | 0 | 0 | 0 | Relegated to 2028 Division I A |

First match(es) will be played: 13 May 2027. Source:
Rules for classification: 1) position in the group; 2) number of points; 3) goal difference; 4) goals scored; 5) seeding before tournament.

== Division I ==
=== Group A ===
The tournament will be held in Tallinn, Estonia from 1 to 7 May 2027.

Teams
Group A:

- Italy
- Lithuania
- Poland

Group B:

- Great Britain
- France
- Estonia

=== Group B ===
The tournament will be held in Târgu Mureș, Romania from 1 to 7 May 2027.

Teams
Group A:

- Japan
- South Korea
- Spain

Group B:

- China
- Netherlands
- Romania

== Division II ==
=== Group A ===
The tournament will be held in Al Ain, United Arab Emirates.

Teams

- Australia
- Belgium
- Croatia
- Georgia
- Israel
- Serbia
- United Arab Emirates

=== Group B ===
The tournament will be held in Bishkek, Kyrgyzstan.

Teams

- Bulgaria
- Iceland
- Kyrgyzstan
- New Zealand
- Turkey

== Division III ==
=== Group A ===
The tournament will be held in Taichung, Chinese Taipei 25 April to 1 May 2027.

Teams
Group A:

- Chinese Taipei
- South Africa
- Thailand

Group B:

- Bosnia and Herzegovina
- Mexico
- Uzbekistan

=== Group B ===
Teams
Group A:

- Luxembourg
- Mongolia
- Turkmenistan

Group B:

- Hong Kong
- North Korea
- Philippines

== Division IV ==
=== Group A ===
The tournament will be held in Kuwait City, Kuwait from 20 to 26 March 2027.

Teams

- Armenia
- Indonesia
- Kuwait
- Singapore

=== Group B ===
The tournament will be held in Kuala Lumpur, Malaysia.

Teams

- India
- Iran
- Malaysia
- Morocco

== See also ==
- 2027 Women's Ice Hockey World Championships
