= 2026 Men's Ice Hockey World Championships =

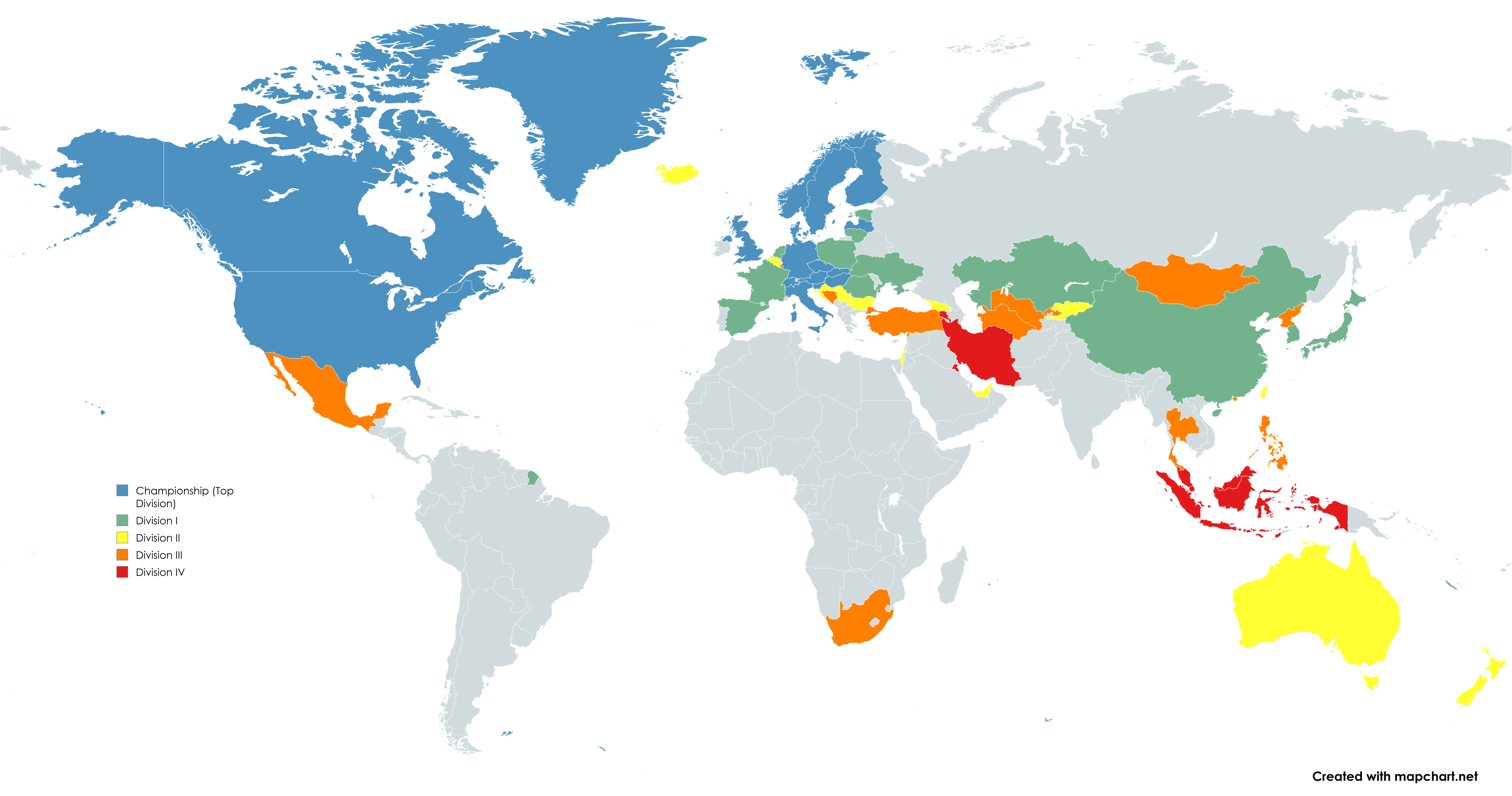
Map of the countries participating at the 2026 IIHF World Championships

The 2026 Men's Ice Hockey World Championships were the 89th such event hosted by the International Ice Hockey Federation. Teams participated at several levels of competition based on their 2025 results. The competition also served as qualifications for division placements in the 2027 edition.

As a test, two divisions were scheduled to play their tournament with two groups, with a knockout stage to follow and the winner of the final to be promoted. The last-placed teams of each group would play a two-game series to determine the relegated team.

== Championship (Top Division) ==
The tournament was held in Zurich and Fribourg, Switzerland, from 15 to 31 May 2026.

=== Group A ===
| Pos | Team | Pld | W | OTW | OTL | L | GF | GA | GD | Pts | Qualification or relegation |
|---|---|---|---|---|---|---|---|---|---|---|---|
| 1 | Switzerland (H) | 7 | 7 | 0 | 0 | 0 | 39 | 7 | +32 | 21 | Quarterfinals |
| 2 | Finland | 7 | 6 | 0 | 0 | 1 | 31 | 11 | +20 | 18 | Quarterfinals |
| 3 | Latvia | 7 | 4 | 0 | 0 | 3 | 24 | 17 | +7 | 12 | Quarterfinals |
| 4 | United States | 7 | 3 | 1 | 0 | 3 | 25 | 21 | +4 | 11 | Quarterfinals |
| 5 | Germany | 7 | 3 | 0 | 1 | 3 | 23 | 22 | +1 | 10 | Qualified for the 2027 IIHF World Championship |
| 6 | Austria | 7 | 3 | 0 | 0 | 4 | 17 | 29 | −12 | 9 | Qualified for the 2027 IIHF World Championship |
| 7 | Hungary | 7 | 1 | 0 | 0 | 6 | 14 | 38 | −24 | 3 | Qualified for the 2027 IIHF World Championship |
| 8 | Great Britain | 7 | 0 | 0 | 0 | 7 | 7 | 35 | −28 | 0 | Relegated to the 2027 Division I A |

Source: IIHF
Rules for classification: 1) points; 2) head-to-head points; 3) head-to-head goal difference; 4) head-to-head number of goals scored; 5) result against closest best-ranked team outside tied teams; 6) seeding before tournament
(H) Host

=== Group B ===
| Pos | Team | Pld | W | OTW | OTL | L | GF | GA | GD | Pts | Qualification or relegation |
|---|---|---|---|---|---|---|---|---|---|---|---|
| 1 | Canada | 7 | 6 | 1 | 0 | 0 | 33 | 13 | +20 | 20 | Quarterfinals |
| 2 | Norway | 7 | 4 | 1 | 1 | 1 | 25 | 14 | +11 | 15 | Quarterfinals |
| 3 | Czechia | 7 | 4 | 0 | 1 | 2 | 19 | 17 | +2 | 13 | Quarterfinals |
| 4 | Sweden | 7 | 4 | 0 | 0 | 3 | 27 | 16 | +11 | 12 | Quarterfinals |
| 5 | Slovakia | 7 | 3 | 1 | 0 | 3 | 21 | 19 | +2 | 11 | Qualified for the 2027 IIHF World Championship |
| 6 | Denmark | 7 | 1 | 1 | 1 | 4 | 15 | 26 | −11 | 6 (Note: Denmark 4–0 Slovenia) | Qualified for the 2027 IIHF World Championship |
| 7 | Slovenia | 7 | 1 | 1 | 1 | 4 | 13 | 25 | −12 | 6 | Qualified for the 2027 IIHF World Championship |
| 8 | Italy | 7 | 0 | 0 | 1 | 6 | 5 | 28 | −23 | 1 | Relegated to the 2027 Division I A |

Source: IIHF
Rules for classification: 1) points; 2) head-to-head points; 3) head-to-head goal difference; 4) head-to-head number of goals scored; 5) result against closest best-ranked team outside tied teams; 6) seeding before tournament

=== Bracket ===
Quarter-finals
28 May
1A Switzerland | 3
4B Sweden | 1
28 May
1B Canada | 4
4A United States | 0
28 May
2A Finland | 4
3B Czechia | 1
28 May
2B Norway | 2
3A Latvia | 0

Semi-finals
30 May
1 Switzerland | 6
4 Norway | 0
30 May
2 Canada | 2
3 Finland | 4

Final
31 May
1 Switzerland | 0
3 Finland (OT) | 1
Third place
31 May
2 Canada | 2
4 Norway (OT) | 3

=== Final standings ===
Teams finishing fifth in the preliminary round were ranked ninth and tenth, teams finishing sixth were ranked 11th and 12th, and so on.

| Pos | Grp | Team | Pld | W | OTW | OTL | L | GF | GA | GD | Pts | Final Result |
|---|---|---|---|---|---|---|---|---|---|---|---|---|
| 1 | A | Finland | 10 | 8 | 1 | 0 | 1 | 40 | 14 | +26 | 26 | Champions |
| 2 | A | Switzerland (H) | 10 | 9 | 0 | 1 | 0 | 48 | 9 | +39 | 28 | Runners-up |
| 3 | B | Norway | 10 | 5 | 2 | 1 | 2 | 30 | 22 | +8 | 20 | Third place |
| 4 | B | Canada | 10 | 7 | 1 | 1 | 1 | 41 | 20 | +21 | 24 | Fourth place |
| 5 | B | Czechia | 8 | 4 | 0 | 1 | 3 | 20 | 21 | −1 | 13 | Eliminated in Quarterfinals |
| 6 | A | Latvia | 8 | 4 | 0 | 0 | 4 | 24 | 19 | +5 | 12 | Eliminated in Quarterfinals |
| 7 | B | Sweden | 8 | 4 | 0 | 0 | 4 | 28 | 19 | +9 | 12 | Eliminated in Quarterfinals |
| 8 | A | United States | 8 | 3 | 1 | 0 | 4 | 25 | 25 | 0 | 11 | Eliminated in Quarterfinals |
| 9 | B | Slovakia | 7 | 3 | 1 | 0 | 3 | 21 | 19 | +2 | 11 | Eliminated in Preliminary round |
| 10 | A | Germany | 7 | 3 | 0 | 1 | 3 | 23 | 22 | +1 | 10 | Eliminated in Preliminary round |
| 11 | A | Austria | 7 | 3 | 0 | 0 | 4 | 17 | 29 | −12 | 9 | Eliminated in Preliminary round |
| 12 | B | Denmark | 7 | 1 | 1 | 1 | 4 | 15 | 26 | −11 | 6 | Eliminated in Preliminary round |
| 13 | B | Slovenia | 7 | 1 | 1 | 1 | 4 | 13 | 25 | −12 | 6 | Eliminated in Preliminary round |
| 14 | A | Hungary | 7 | 1 | 0 | 0 | 6 | 14 | 38 | −24 | 3 | Eliminated in Preliminary round |
| 15 | B | Italy | 7 | 0 | 0 | 1 | 6 | 5 | 28 | −23 | 1 | Relegated to the 2027 IIHF World Championship Division I |
| 16 | A | Great Britain | 7 | 0 | 0 | 0 | 7 | 7 | 35 | −28 | 0 | Relegated to the 2027 IIHF World Championship Division I |

Source: IIHF
Rules for classification: 1) position in the group; 2) number of points; 3) goal difference; 4) goals scored; 5) seeding before tournament.
(H) Host

== Division I ==
=== Group A ===
The tournament was held in Sosnowiec, Poland from 2 to 8 May 2026.

| Pos | Team | Pld | W | OTW | OTL | L | GF | GA | GD | Pts | Promotion or relegation |
|---|---|---|---|---|---|---|---|---|---|---|---|
| 1 | Kazakhstan | 5 | 3 | 2 | 0 | 0 | 20 | 8 | +12 | 13 | Promotion to the 2027 Top Division |
| 2 | Ukraine | 5 | 3 | 0 | 1 | 1 | 14 | 12 | +2 | 10 | Promotion to the 2027 Top Division |
| 3 | France | 5 | 1 | 2 | 1 | 1 | 12 | 11 | +1 | 8 (Note: France 3–2 (GWS) Poland) | |
| 4 | Poland (H) | 5 | 2 | 0 | 2 | 1 | 12 | 12 | 0 | 8 | |
| 5 | Lithuania | 5 | 0 | 1 | 2 | 2 | 7 | 12 | −5 | 4 | |
| 6 | Japan | 5 | 0 | 1 | 0 | 4 | 9 | 19 | −10 | 2 | Relegation to the 2027 Division I B |

Source: IIHF
Rules for classification: 1) points; 2) head-to-head points; 3) head-to-head goal difference; 4) head-to-head number of goals scored; 5) result against closest best-ranked team outside tied teams; 6) result against second-best ranked team outside tied teams; 7) seeding before tournament.
(H) Host

=== Group B ===
The tournament was held in Shenzhen, China from 29 April to 5 May 2026.

| Pos | Team | Pld | W | OTW | OTL | L | GF | GA | GD | Pts | Promotion |
|---|---|---|---|---|---|---|---|---|---|---|---|
| 1 | Estonia | 5 | 4 | 0 | 1 | 0 | 27 | 10 | +17 | 13 | Promotion to the 2027 Division I A |
| 2 | China (H) | 5 | 2 | 2 | 0 | 1 | 21 | 16 | +5 | 10 (Note: Romania 3–4 (OT) China) | |
| 3 | Romania | 5 | 3 | 0 | 1 | 1 | 19 | 9 | +10 | 10 | |
| 4 | South Korea | 5 | 3 | 0 | 0 | 2 | 20 | 17 | +3 | 9 | |
| 5 | Spain | 5 | 1 | 0 | 0 | 4 | 11 | 25 | −14 | 3 | |
| 6 | Netherlands | 5 | 0 | 0 | 0 | 5 | 5 | 26 | −21 | 0 | |

Source: IIHF
Rules for classification: 1) points; 2) head-to-head points; 3) head-to-head goal difference; 4) head-to-head number of goals scored; 5) result against closest best-ranked team outside tied teams; 6) result against second-best ranked team outside tied teams; 7) seeding before tournament.
(H) Host

== Division II ==
=== Group A ===
The tournament was scheduled to be held in Al-Ain, United Arab Emirates from 20 to 26 April 2026. On 18 March 2026, the tournament was postponed due to the 2026 Iran war. It was cancelled on 7 April 2026.

Teams

- Australia
- Belgium
- Croatia
- Georgia
- Serbia
- United Arab Emirates

=== Group B ===
The tournament was held in Sofia, Bulgaria from 6 to 12 April 2026.

| Pos | Team | Pld | W | OTW | OTL | L | GF | GA | GD | Pts | Relegation |
|---|---|---|---|---|---|---|---|---|---|---|---|
| 1 | Israel | 5 | 3 | 2 | 0 | 0 | 26 | 14 | +12 | 13 | |
| 2 | New Zealand | 5 | 3 | 0 | 1 | 1 | 29 | 20 | +9 | 10 | |
| 3 | Iceland | 5 | 3 | 0 | 0 | 2 | 21 | 18 | +3 | 9 | |
| 4 | Bulgaria (H) | 5 | 2 | 0 | 0 | 3 | 15 | 21 | −6 | 6 | |
| 5 | Kyrgyzstan | 5 | 1 | 0 | 1 | 3 | 16 | 23 | −7 | 4 | |
| 6 | Chinese Taipei | 5 | 1 | 0 | 0 | 4 | 17 | 28 | −11 | 3 | Relegated to the 2027 Division III A |

Source: IIHF
Rules for classification: 1) points; 2) head-to-head points; 3) head-to-head goal difference; 4) head-to-head number of goals scored; 5) result against closest best-ranked team outside tied teams; 6) result against second-best ranked team outside tied teams; 7) seeding before tournament.
(H) Host

== Division III ==
=== Group A ===
The tournament was held in Cape Town, South Africa from 13 to 19 April 2026.

| Pos | Team | Pld | W | OTW | OTL | L | GF | GA | GD | Pts | Promotion or relegation |
|---|---|---|---|---|---|---|---|---|---|---|---|
| 1 | Turkey | 5 | 5 | 0 | 0 | 0 | 28 | 10 | +18 | 15 | Promotion to the 2027 Division II B |
| 2 | Mexico | 5 | 2 | 1 | 1 | 1 | 26 | 20 | +6 | 9 | |
| 3 | Bosnia and Herzegovina | 5 | 2 | 1 | 0 | 2 | 17 | 14 | +3 | 8 | |
| 4 | South Africa (H) | 5 | 2 | 0 | 1 | 2 | 17 | 26 | −9 | 7 | |
| 5 | Thailand | 5 | 1 | 1 | 0 | 3 | 18 | 29 | −11 | 5 | |
| 6 | Turkmenistan | 5 | 0 | 0 | 1 | 4 | 19 | 26 | −7 | 1 | Relegation to the 2027 Division III B |

Source: IIHF
Rules for classification: 1) points; 2) head-to-head points; 3) head-to-head goal difference; 4) head-to-head number of goals scored; 5) result against closest best-ranked team outside tied teams; 6) result against second-best ranked team outside tied teams; 7) seeding before tournament.
(H) Host

=== Group B ===
The tournament was held in Hong Kong from 13 to 19 April 2026.

| Pos | Team | Pld | W | OTW | OTL | L | GF | GA | GD | Pts | Promotion |
|---|---|---|---|---|---|---|---|---|---|---|---|
| 1 | Uzbekistan | 5 | 5 | 0 | 0 | 0 | 97 | 11 | +86 | 15 | Promotion to the 2027 Division III A |
| 2 | North Korea | 5 | 4 | 0 | 0 | 1 | 28 | 32 | −4 | 12 | |
| 3 | Hong Kong (H) | 5 | 3 | 0 | 0 | 2 | 35 | 20 | +15 | 9 | |
| 4 | Luxembourg | 5 | 2 | 0 | 0 | 3 | 13 | 33 | −20 | 6 | |
| 5 | Mongolia | 5 | 1 | 0 | 0 | 4 | 27 | 56 | −29 | 3 | |
| 6 | Philippines | 5 | 0 | 0 | 0 | 5 | 15 | 63 | −48 | 0 | |

Source: IIHF
Rules for classification: 1) points; 2) head-to-head points; 3) head-to-head goal difference; 4) head-to-head number of goals scored; 5) result against closest best-ranked team outside tied teams; 6) result against second-best ranked team outside tied teams; 7) seeding before tournament.
(H) Host

== Division IV ==
The tournament was scheduled to be held in Kuwait City, Kuwait from 12 to 18 April 2026. On 18 March 2026, the tournament was postponed due to the 2026 Iran war. A week later, the tournament was cancelled.

Teams

- Armenia
- Indonesia
- Iran
- Kuwait
- Malaysia
- Singapore

== See also ==
- 2026 Women's Ice Hockey World Championships
