= 2027 IIHF World Championship Group A =

Group A is one of two groups of the 2027 IIHF World Championship. The four best-placed teams advance to the playoff round, while the last placed team will be relegated to Division I in 2028.

== Standings ==
Pos	Team	Pld	W	OTW	OTL	L	GF	GA	GD	Pts	Qualification or relegation
1	Switzerland	0	0	0	0	0	0	0	0	0	Quarterfinals
1	Finland	0	0	0	0	0	0	0	0	0	Quarterfinals
1	Sweden	0	0	0	0	0	0	0	0	0	Quarterfinals
1	Germany (H)	0	0	0	0	0	0	0	0	0	Quarterfinals
1	Latvia	0	0	0	0	0	0	0	0	0	Qualified for the 2028 IIHF World Championship
1	Austria	0	0	0	0	0	0	0	0	0	Qualified for the 2028 IIHF World Championship
1	Slovenia	0	0	0	0	0	0	0	0	0	Qualified for the 2028 IIHF World Championship
1	Ukraine	0	0	0	0	0	0	0	0	0	Relegated to the 2028 Division I A

First match(es) will be played: 13 May 2027. Source:
Rules for classification: 1) points; 2) head-to-head points; 3) head-to-head goal difference; 4) head-to-head number of goals scored; 5) result against closest best-ranked team outside tied teams; 6) result against second-best-ranked team outside tied teams; 7) seeding before tournament
(H) Host

== Matches ==
=== Switzerland vs Germany ===
13 May 2027; 20:20	Switzerland	v	Germany	Veltins-Arena, Gelsenkirchen

=== Ukraine vs Sweden ===
14 May 2027; 16:20	Ukraine	v	Sweden	SAP Arena, Mannheim

=== Finland vs Latvia ===
14 May 2027; 20:20	Finland	v	Latvia	SAP Arena, Mannheim

=== Switzerland vs Slovenia ===
15 May 2027; 16:20	Switzerland	v	Slovenia	SAP Arena, Mannheim

=== Austria vs Germany ===
15 May 2027; 20:20	Austria	v	Germany	SAP Arena, Mannheim

=== Sweden vs Latvia ===
16 May 2027; 12:20	Sweden	v	Latvia	SAP Arena, Mannheim

=== Switzerland vs Finland ===
16 May 2027; 16:20	Switzerland	v	Finland	SAP Arena, Mannheim

=== Germany vs Ukraine ===
16 May 2027; 20:20	Germany	v	Ukraine	SAP Arena, Mannheim

=== Slovenia vs Sweden ===
17 May 2027; 16:20	Slovenia	v	Sweden	SAP Arena, Mannheim

=== Austria vs Finland ===
17 May 2027; 20:20	Austria	v	Finland	SAP Arena, Mannheim

=== Ukraine vs Austria ===
18 May 2027; 16:20	Ukraine	v	Austria	SAP Arena, Mannheim

=== Latvia vs Switzerland ===
18 May 2027; 20:20	Latvia	v	Switzerland	SAP Arena, Mannheim

=== Germany vs Finland ===
19 May 2027; 16:20	Germany	v	Finland	SAP Arena, Mannheim

=== Slovenia vs Ukraine ===
19 May 2027; 20:20	Slovenia	v	Ukraine	SAP Arena, Mannheim

=== Sweden vs Austria ===
20 May 2027; 16:20	Sweden	v	Austria	SAP Arena, Mannheim

=== Germany vs Slovenia ===
20 May 2027; 20:20	Germany	v	Slovenia	SAP Arena, Mannheim

=== Latvia vs Ukraine ===
21 May 2027; 16:20	Latvia	v	Ukraine	SAP Arena, Mannheim

=== Sweden vs Switzerland ===
21 May 2027; 20:20	Sweden	v	Switzerland	SAP Arena, Mannheim

=== Austria vs Slovenia ===
22 May 2027; 12:20	Austria	v	Slovenia	SAP Arena, Mannheim

=== Latvia vs Germany ===
22 May 2027; 16:20	Latvia	v	Germany	SAP Arena, Mannheim

=== Finland vs Ukraine ===
22 May 2027; 20:20	Finland	v	Ukraine	SAP Arena, Mannheim

=== Switzerland vs Austria ===
23 May 2027; 16:20	Switzerland	v	Austria	SAP Arena, Mannheim

=== Finland vs Sweden ===
23 May 2027; 20:20	Finland	v	Sweden	SAP Arena, Mannheim

=== Slovenia vs Latvia ===
24 May 2027; 16:20	Slovenia	v	Latvia	SAP Arena, Mannheim

=== Ukraine vs Switzerland ===
24 May 2027; 20:20	Ukraine	v	Switzerland	SAP Arena, Mannheim

=== Finland vs Slovenia ===
25 May 2027; 12:20	Finland	v	Slovenia	SAP Arena, Mannheim

=== Latvia vs Austria ===
25 May 2027; 16:20	Latvia	v	Austria	SAP Arena, Mannheim

=== Germany vs Sweden ===
25 May 2027; 20:20	Germany	v	Sweden	SAP Arena, Mannheim
