= 2027 IIHF World Championship Group B =

Group B is one of two groups of the 2027 IIHF World Championship. The four best-placed teams advance to the playoff round, while the last placed team will be relegated to Division I in 2028.

== Standings ==
Pos	Team	Pld	W	OTW	OTL	L	GF	GA	GD	Pts	Qualification or relegation
1	Canada	0	0	0	0	0	0	0	0	0	Quarterfinals
1	United States	0	0	0	0	0	0	0	0	0	Quarterfinals
1	Czechia	0	0	0	0	0	0	0	0	0	Quarterfinals
1	Slovakia	0	0	0	0	0	0	0	0	0	Quarterfinals
1	Denmark	0	0	0	0	0	0	0	0	0	Qualified for the 2028 IIHF World Championship
1	Norway	0	0	0	0	0	0	0	0	0	Qualified for the 2028 IIHF World Championship
1	Kazakhstan	0	0	0	0	0	0	0	0	0	Qualified for the 2028 IIHF World Championship
1	Hungary	0	0	0	0	0	0	0	0	0	Relegated to the 2028 Division I A

First match(es) will be played: 14 May 2027. Source:
Rules for classification: 1) points; 2) head-to-head points; 3) head-to-head goal difference; 4) head-to-head number of goals scored; 5) result against closest best-ranked team outside tied teams; 6) result against second-best-ranked team outside tied teams; 7) seeding before tournament

== Matches ==
=== Czechia vs Norway ===
14 May 2027; 16:20	Czechia	v	Norway	PSD Bank Dome, Düsseldorf

=== Canada vs United States ===
14 May 2027; 20:20	Canada	v	United States	PSD Bank Dome, Düsseldorf

=== Slovakia vs Denmark ===
15 May 2027; 12:20	Slovakia	v	Denmark	PSD Bank Dome, Düsseldorf

=== Kazakhstan vs Czechia ===
15 May 2027; 16:20	Kazakhstan	v	Czechia	PSD Bank Dome, Düsseldorf

=== Hungary vs Canada ===
15 May 2027; 20:20	Hungary	v	Canada	PSD Bank Dome, Düsseldorf

=== Slovakia vs Kazakhstan ===
16 May 2027; 12:20	Slovakia	v	Kazakhstan	PSD Bank Dome, Düsseldorf

=== Hungary vs Denmark ===
16 May 2027; 16:20	Hungary	v	Denmark	PSD Bank Dome, Düsseldorf

=== Norway vs United States ===
16 May 2027; 20:20	Norway	v	United States	PSD Bank Dome, Düsseldorf

=== Canada vs Norway ===
17 May 2027; 16:20	Canada	v	Norway	PSD Bank Dome, Düsseldorf

=== United States vs Czechia ===
17 May 2027; 20:20	United States	v	Czechia	PSD Bank Dome, Düsseldorf

=== Kazakhstan vs Denmark ===
18 May 2027; 16:20	Kazakhstan	v	Denmark	PSD Bank Dome, Düsseldorf

=== Slovakia vs Hungary ===
18 May 2027; 20:20	Slovakia	v	Hungary	PSD Bank Dome, Düsseldorf

=== United States vs Kazakhstan ===
19 May 2027; 16:20	United States	v	Kazakhstan	PSD Bank Dome, Düsseldorf

=== Czechia vs Hungary ===
19 May 2027; 20:20	Czechia	v	Hungary	PSD Bank Dome, Düsseldorf

=== Canada vs Slovakia ===
20 May 2027; 16:20	Canada	v	Slovakia	PSD Bank Dome, Düsseldorf

=== Denmark vs Norway ===
20 May 2027; 20:20	Denmark	v	Norway	PSD Bank Dome, Düsseldorf

=== Canada vs Kazakhstan ===
21 May 2027; 16:20	Canada	v	Kazakhstan	PSD Bank Dome, Düsseldorf

=== United States vs Hungary ===
21 May 2027; 20:20	United States	v	Hungary	PSD Bank Dome, Düsseldorf

=== Norway vs Kazakhstan ===
22 May 2027; 12:20	Norway	v	Kazakhstan	PSD Bank Dome, Düsseldorf

=== Denmark vs Czechia ===
22 May 2027; 16:20	Denmark	v	Czechia	PSD Bank Dome, Düsseldorf

=== Slovakia vs United States ===
22 May 2027; 20:20	Slovakia	v	United States	PSD Bank Dome, Düsseldorf

=== Hungary vs Norway ===
23 May 2027; 16:20	Hungary	v	Norway	PSD Bank Dome, Düsseldorf

=== Denmark vs Canada ===
23 May 2027; 20:20	Denmark	v	Canada	PSD Bank Dome, Düsseldorf

=== Kazakhstan vs Hungary ===
24 May 2027; 16:20	Kazakhstan	v	Hungary	PSD Bank Dome, Düsseldorf

=== Czechia vs Slovakia ===
24 May 2027; 20:20	Czechia	v	Slovakia	PSD Bank Dome, Düsseldorf

=== United States vs Denmark ===
25 May 2027; 12:20	United States	v	Denmark	PSD Bank Dome, Düsseldorf

=== Norway vs Slovakia ===
25 May 2027; 16:20	Norway	v	Slovakia	PSD Bank Dome, Düsseldorf

=== Czechia vs Canada ===
25 May 2027; 20:20	Czechia	v	Canada	PSD Bank Dome, Düsseldorf
