= 2027 IIHF World Championship playoff round =

The playoff round of the 2027 IIHF World Championship will be held from 27 to 30 May 2027. The top four of each preliminary group qualify for the playoff round.

== Qualified teams ==
Group	Winners	Runners-up	Third place	Fourth place	TBD
A					
B					

=== Qualified teams' seedings ===
Quarter-finalists are paired according to their positions in the groups: the first-place team in each preliminary-round group plays the fourth-place team of the other group, while the second-place team plays the third-place team of the other group.

Semi-finalists are paired according to their seeding after the preliminary round, which is determined by the following criteria. The best-ranked semi-finalist plays against the lowest-ranked semi-finalist, while the second-best ranked semi-finalist plays the third-best ranked semi-finalist.

Rank	Team	Grp	Pos	Pts	GD	GF	Seed
	TBD	A	1				
	TBD	B	1				
	TBD	A	2				
	TBD	B	2				
	TBD	A	3				
	TBD	B	3				
	TBD	A	4				
	TBD	B	4				

Classification rules: 1) position in the group; 2) number of points; 3) goal difference; 4) number of goals scored for; 5) seeding number entering the tournament.

== Bracket ==
There will be a re-seeding after the quarterfinals.

Quarter-finals
27 May
1A
4B
27 May
1B
4A
27 May
2A
3B
27 May
2B
3A

Semi-finals
29 May
29 May

Final
30 May
Third place
30 May

All times are local (UTC+2).

== Quarterfinals ==
27 May 2027; 16:20	TBD	v	TBD	SAP Arena, Mannheim

27 May 2027; 16:20	TBD	v	TBD	PSD Bank Dome, Düsseldorf

27 May 2027; 20:20	TBD	v	TBD	SAP Arena, Mannheim

27 May 2027; 20:20	TBD	v	TBD	PSD Bank Dome, Düsseldorf

== Semifinals ==
29 May 2027; 14:20	TBD	v	TBD	PSD Bank Dome, Düsseldorf

29 May 2027; 18:20	TBD	v	TBD	PSD Bank Dome, Düsseldorf

== Bronze medal game ==
30 May 2027; 15:20	LSF1	v	LSF2	PSD Bank Dome, Düsseldorf

== Gold medal game ==
30 May 2027; 20:20	WSF1	v	WSF2	PSD Bank Dome, Düsseldorf
