= Chinese Taipei men's national ice hockey team =

Chinese Taipei
- Association: Chinese Taipei Ice Hockey Federation
- General manager: Liu Mao-fen
- Head coach: Weng To
- Assistants: Chou Hung-hsuan
- Captain: Lun Hung-Ju
- Most games: Shen Yen-Chin (57)
- Top scorer: Weng To (55)
- Most points: Shen Yen-Chin (89)
- Team colors
- IIHF code: TPE

Ranking
- Current IIHF: 34 (▼1) (3 June 2026)
- Highest IIHF: 38 (2025)
- Lowest IIHF: 48 (2017–18)

First international
- Chinese Taipei 2–2 Hong Kong (Perth, Australia; 3 March 1987)

Biggest win
- Chinese Taipei 30–0 Macau (Taipei City, Taiwan; 15 March 2015)

Biggest defeat
- Kazakhstan 35–0 Chinese Taipei (Astana, Kazakhstan; 3 February 2011)

IIHF World Championships
- Appearances: 7 (first in 2017)
- Best result: 39th (2024, 2025)

Asian Winter Games
- Appearances: 3 (first in 2011)
- Best result: 5th (2011, 2025)

IIHF Challenge Cup of Asia
- Appearances: 8 (first in 2008)
- Best result: 1st (2008, 2010, 2013, 2014, 2015, 2016)

International record (W–L–T)
- 53–42-1

Chinese Taipei men's national ice hockey team
- Traditional Chinese: 中華臺北國家冰球隊
- Simplified Chinese: 中华台北国家冰球队
Transcriptions
Standard Mandarin
- Hanyu Pinyin: Zhōnghuá Táiběi Guójiā Bīngqiú Duì

The Chinese Taipei national ice hockey team is the national men's ice hockey team of the Republic of China (Taiwan). The team is controlled by the Chinese Taipei Ice Hockey Federation and is a member of the International Ice Hockey Federation (IIHF). Chinese Taipei currently competes in the Division II B . As of December 2025, it is ranked 38th in the IIHF World Ranking and 6th in the specialized Asian Ranking.

== History ==
Chinese Taipei has only been active in 1987, 2005, 2008 and 2010. In 1987, they competed unofficially in the World Championship Pool D in Perth, Australia where their best result was a 2–2 draw against Hong Kong. Chinese Taipei was not a member of the IIHF at the time, but showed up to the tournament anyway, and was allowed to play one game against each other team. In 2005, they played 3 friendlies, losing to Hong Kong once, 6–2 and defeating Thailand twice, 5–3 and 11–4. In 2008, they won the inaugural Challenge Cup of Asia held in Hong Kong. In 2009, they failed to send a team to the tournament and in April 2010, they hosted the tournament (now recognized by the IIHF) and won it again.

As with other sports teams, under political opposition from the People's Republic of China, the Republic of China has competed under the "Chinese Taipei" banner as a result of the 1979 Nagoya Resolution.

== Tournament record ==
=== World Championships ===
Year	Host	Result	Pld	W	OW	OL	L
1987 through 2016		did not participate (Competed unofficially in the 1987 World Championship Pool D)					
2017	(Bulgaria) Sofia	46th place (6th in Division III)	4	1	0	0	3
2018	(South Africa) Cape Town	44th place (4th in Division III)	5	2	0	0	3
2019	(Bulgaria) Sofia	45th place (5th in Division III)	5	1	1	0	3
2020	(Luxembourg) Kockelscheuer	Cancelled due to the COVID-19 pandemic					
2021	(Luxembourg) Kockelscheuer	Cancelled due to the COVID-19 pandemic					
2022	(Luxembourg) Kockelscheuer	40th place (4th in Division III A)	4	1	0	0	3
2023	(South Africa) Cape Town	41st place (1st in Division III A)	4	4	0	0	0
2024	(Bulgaria) Sofia	39th place (5th in Division II B)	5	1	0	1	3
2025	(New Zealand) Dunedin	39th place (5th in Division II B)	5	1	0	1	3
2026	(Bulgaria) Sofia	40th place (6th in Division II B)	5	1	0	0	4
2027	(Taiwan) Taichung	(Division III A)					

=== Asian Winter Games ===
Year	Host	Result	Pld	W	OW	OL	L	GF	GA	GD
1986-2007	did not participate									
2011	(Kazakhstan) Astana	5th place	4	0	0	0	4	1	85	-84
2017	(Japan) Sapporo	6th place (2nd in Division I)	5	3	1	1	0	34	13	+21
2025	(China) Harbin	5th place	6	1	0	0	5	6	59	-53
Total	-	3/9	15	4	1	1	9	41	157	-116

=== Challenge Cup of Asia ===
Year	Host	Result	Pld	W	OW	OL	L	GF	GA	GD
2008	Hong Kong	1st place	5	4	0	0	1	20	6	+14
2009	(United Arab Emirates) Abu Dhabi	did not participate								
2010	(Taiwan) Taipei	1st place	5	4	0	0	1	18	7	+11
2011	Kuwait City	did not participate								
2012	(India) Dehradun	5th place	4	0	0	0	4	2	43	-41
2013	(Thailand) Bangkok	1st place	7	6	1	0	0	67	7	+60
2014	(United Arab Emirates) Abu Dhabi	1st place	5	5	0	0	0	53	8	+45
2015	(Taiwan) Taipei	1st place	4	4	0	0	0	52	6	+46
2016	(United Arab Emirates) Abu Dhabi	1st place	4	4	0	0	0	46	6	+40
Since 2017	did not participate because of World Championship									
Total	-	7/9	34	27	1	0	6	258	83	+175

== All-time record against other nations ==
Last match update: 3 May 2025

Key
Positive balance (more Wins)
Neutral balance (Wins = Losses)
Negative balance (more Losses)

Team	GP	W	T	L	GF	GA
Australia	1	0	0	1	3	31
Belgium	1	0	0	1	1	8
Bosnia and Herzegovina	1	1	0	0	5	0
Bulgaria	5	1	0	4	12	29
China	2	0	0	2	1	15
Croatia	1	0	0	1	1	6
Georgia	3	0	0	3	7	20
Hong Kong	10	6	1	3	38	29
Iceland	1	0	0	1	1	2
Japan	2	0	0	2	0	33
Kazakhstan	2	0	0	2	0	52
Kuwait	5	4	0	1	60	14
Luxembourg	3	3	0	0	20	7
Macau	3	3	0	0	50	0
Malaysia	3	2	0	1	14	6
Mexico	1	1	0	0	7	1
Mongolia	5	5	0	0	49	9
Netherlands	1	0	0	1	1	14
New Zealand	3	0	0	3	3	20
Serbia	1	0	0	1	0	6
Singapore	3	3	0	0	27	4
South Africa	4	2	0	2	21	19
South Korea	3	0	0	3	3	60
Spain	1	0	0	1	0	11
Thailand	14	12	0	2	90	40
Turkey	4	1	0	4	15	23
Turkmenistan	3	2	0	1	10	9
United Arab Emirates	10	7	0	3	39	39
Total	97	53	1	43	478	507
