= Oleksandr Savytskyi =

Ukrainian ice hockey player and coach

- Born: May 3, 1971 (age 54); Kyiv, Ukrainian SSR, Soviet Union
- Height: 5 ft 11 in (180 cm)
- Weight: 192 lb (87 kg; 13 st 10 lb)
- Position: Defenceman
- Shot: Left
- Played for: Sokil Kyiv; Keramin Minsk; IF Björklöven; Aalborg Panthers; CSKA Moscow; ES Weißwasser; Khimik Voskresensk; HKm Zvolen; Ak Bars Kazan; HC Plzeň; ShVSM Kyiv
- National team: Ukraine
- Playing career: 1988–2008

Oleksandr Valeryiovich Savytskyi (Ukrainian: Олександр Валерійович Савицький; born 3 May 1971), is a Ukrainian retired professional ice hockey player and coach. He played for multiple teams during a career that lasted from 1988 until 2008. He also played internationally for the Ukrainian national team at several World Championships, and later served as the head coach of the national team, as well as HK Kremenchuk of the Ukrainian Hockey League.
