= 2027 IIHF World Championship Division I =

Tournament details
- Host countries: Estonia; Romania
- Venues: 2 (in 2 host cities)
- Dates: 1–7 May
- Teams: 12

The 2027 IIHF World Championship Division I consists of two international ice hockey tournaments organized by the International Ice Hockey Federation. Divisions I A and I B represent the second and the third tier of the IIHF Ice Hockey World Championships.

This will mark the first year that the format is changed from having a single group with a round-robin, to a two-group group stage with three teams per group. The teams play the teams from the other group once. The top two placed teams qualify for the semifinals, which will be played against the team from the same group. The winners move on to the final to determine the promoted team. Third-placed teams from both groups face each other in a two-legged tie to play out the relegated team.

== Group A tournament ==
2026 IIHF World Championship Division I A

Tournament details
- Host country: Estonia
- City: Tallinn
- Venue: 1 (in 1 host city)
- Dates: 1–7 May
- Teams: 6

The tournament will be played in Tallinn, Estonia from 1 to 7 May 2027.

=== Participants ===
Team	Qualification
Italy	Placed 15th in the Elite Division in 2026 and was relegated.
Great Britain	Placed 16th in the Elite Division in 2026 and was relegated.
France	Placed 3rd in Division I A in 2026.
Poland	Placed 4th in Division I A in 2026.
Lithuania	Placed 5th in Division I A in 2026.
Estonia	Host, placed 1st in Division I B in 2026 and was promoted.

=== Preliminary round ===
==== Group A ====
Pos	Team	Pld	W	OTW	OTL	L	GF	GA	GD	Pts	Qualification
1	Italy	0	0	0	0	0	0	0	0	0	Knockout stage
2	Poland	0	0	0	0	0	0	0	0	0	Knockout stage
3	Lithuania	0	0	0	0	0	0	0	0	0	Relegation round

First match(es) will be played: 1 May 2027. Source:
Rules for classification: 1) points; 2) head-to-head points; 3) head-to-head goal difference; 4) head-to-head number of goals scored; 5) result against closest best-ranked team outside tied teams; 6) result against second-best ranked team outside tied teams; 7) seeding before tournament.

==== Group B ====
Pos	Team	Pld	W	OTW	OTL	L	GF	GA	GD	Pts	Qualification
1	Great Britain	0	0	0	0	0	0	0	0	0	Knockout stage
2	France (Note: As France will be hosting the 2028 IIHF World Championship, they will be promoted regardless of their finish.)	0	0	0	0	0	0	0	0	0	Knockout stage
3	Estonia (H)	0	0	0	0	0	0	0	0	0	Relegation round

First match(es) will be played: 1 May 2027. Source:
Rules for classification: 1) points; 2) head-to-head points; 3) head-to-head goal difference; 4) head-to-head number of goals scored; 5) result against closest best-ranked team outside tied teams; 6) result against second-best ranked team outside tied teams; 7) seeding before tournament.
(H) Host

=== Relegation round ===
Team 1	Agg.	Team 2	1st leg	2nd leg
A3		B3	May	May

=== Knockout stage ===
Semi-finals
May
A1
A2
May
B1
B2

Final
May
Third place
May

=== Final standings ===
Pos	Grp	Team	Pld	W	OTW	OTL	L	GF	GA	GD	Pts	Final result
1		TBD	0	0	0	0	0	0	0	0	0	Promoted to 2028 IIHF World Championship
2		TBD	0	0	0	0	0	0	0	0	0	Runners-up
3		TBD	0	0	0	0	0	0	0	0	0	Third place
4		TBD	0	0	0	0	0	0	0	0	0	Fourth place
5		TBD	0	0	0	0	0	0	0	0	0	Fifth place
6		TBD	0	0	0	0	0	0	0	0	0	Relegated to 2028 Division I B

First match(es) will be played: May 2027. Source:
Rules for classification: 1) position in the group; 2) number of points; 3) goal difference; 4) goals scored; 5) seeding before tournament.

== Group B tournament ==
2027 IIHF World Championship Division I B
Tournament details
- Host country: Romania
- City: Târgu Mureș
- Venue: 1 (in 1 host city)
- Dates: 1–7 May
- Teams: 6

The tournament will be played in Târgu Mureș, Romania from 1 to 7 May 2027.

=== Participants ===
As the 2026 II A tournament was cancelled, no team was relegated.

Team	Qualification
Japan	Placed 6th in Division I A in 2026 and was relegated.
China	Placed 2nd in Division I B in 2026.
Romania	Placed 3rd in Division I B in 2026.
South Korea	Placed 4th in Division I B in 2026.
Spain	Placed 5th in Division I B in 2026.
Netherlands	Placed 6th in Division I B in 2026.

=== Preliminary round ===
==== Group A ====
Pos	Team	Pld	W	OTW	OTL	L	GF	GA	GD	Pts	Qualification
1	Japan	0	0	0	0	0	0	0	0	0	Knockout stage
2	South Korea	0	0	0	0	0	0	0	0	0	Knockout stage
3	Spain	0	0	0	0	0	0	0	0	0	Relegation round

First match(es) will be played: 1 May 2027. Source:
Rules for classification: 1) points; 2) head-to-head points; 3) head-to-head goal difference; 4) head-to-head number of goals scored; 5) result against closest best-ranked team outside tied teams; 6) result against second-best ranked team outside tied teams; 7) seeding before tournament.

==== Group B ====
Pos	Team	Pld	W	OTW	OTL	L	GF	GA	GD	Pts	Qualification
1	China	0	0	0	0	0	0	0	0	0	Knockout stage
2	Romania (H)	0	0	0	0	0	0	0	0	0	Knockout stage
3	Netherlands	0	0	0	0	0	0	0	0	0	Relegation round

First match(es) will be played: 1 May 2027. Source:
Rules for classification: 1) points; 2) head-to-head points; 3) head-to-head goal difference; 4) head-to-head number of goals scored; 5) result against closest best-ranked team outside tied teams; 6) result against second-best ranked team outside tied teams; 7) seeding before tournament.
(H) Host

=== Relegation round ===
Team 1	Agg.	Team 2	1st leg	2nd leg
A3		B3	May	May

=== Knockout stage ===
Semi-finals
May
A1
A2
May
B1
B2

Final
May
Third place
May

=== Final standings ===
Pos	Grp	Team	Pld	W	OTW	OTL	L	GF	GA	GD	Pts	Final result
1		TBD	0	0	0	0	0	0	0	0	0	Promoted to 2028 Division I A
2		TBD	0	0	0	0	0	0	0	0	0	Runners-up
3		TBD	0	0	0	0	0	0	0	0	0	Third place
4		TBD	0	0	0	0	0	0	0	0	0	Fourth place
5		TBD	0	0	0	0	0	0	0	0	0	Fifth place
6		TBD	0	0	0	0	0	0	0	0	0	Relegated to 2028 Division II A

First match(es) will be played: 1 May 2027. Source:
Rules for classification: 1) position in the group; 2) number of points; 3) goal difference; 4) goals scored; 5) seeding before tournament.
