= 2027 IIHF World Championship Division III =

Tournament details
- Host countries: Chinese Taipei; TBD
- Venues: 2 (in 2 host cities)
- Dates: 19–25 April; TBD
- Teams: 12

The 2027 IIHF World Championship Division III consists of two international ice hockey tournaments organized by the International Ice Hockey Federation. Divisions III A and III B represent the sixth and the seventh tier of the IIHF Ice Hockey World Championships.

This will mark the first year that the format is changed from having a single group with a round-robin, to a two-group group stage with three teams per group. The teams play the teams from the other group once. The top two placed teams qualify for the semifinals, which will be played against the team from the same group. The winners move on to the final to determine the promoted team. Third-placed teams from both groups face each other in a two-legged tie to play out the relegated team.

== Group A tournament ==
2026 IIHF World Championship Division III A

Tournament details
- Host country: Chinese Taipei
- City: Taichung
- Venue: 1 (in 1 host city)
- Dates: 19–25 April
- Teams: 6

The tournament will be played in Taichung, Chinese Taipei from 19 to 25 April 2027.

=== Participants ===
Team	Qualification
Chinese Taipei	Host, placed 6th in Division II B in 2026 and were relegated.
Mexico	Placed 2nd in Division III A in 2026.
Bosnia and Herzegovina	Placed 3rd in Division III A in 2026.
South Africa	Placed 4th in Division III A in 2026.
Thailand	Placed 5th in Division III A in 2026.
Uzbekistan	Placed 1st in Division III B in 2026 and were promoted.

=== Preliminary round ===
==== Group A ====
Pos	Team	Pld	W	OTW	OTL	L	GF	GA	GD	Pts	Qualification
1	Chinese Taipei (H)	0	0	0	0	0	0	0	0	0	Knockout stage
2	South Africa	0	0	0	0	0	0	0	0	0	Knockout stage
3	Thailand	0	0	0	0	0	0	0	0	0	Relegation round

First match(es) will be played: 19 April 2027. Source:
Rules for classification: 1) points; 2) head-to-head points; 3) head-to-head goal difference; 4) head-to-head number of goals scored; 5) result against closest best-ranked team outside tied teams; 6) result against second-best ranked team outside tied teams; 7) seeding before tournament.
(H) Host

==== Group B ====
Pos	Team	Pld	W	OTW	OTL	L	GF	GA	GD	Pts	Qualification
1	Mexico	0	0	0	0	0	0	0	0	0	Knockout stage
2	Bosnia and Herzegovina	0	0	0	0	0	0	0	0	0	Knockout stage
3	Uzbekistan	0	0	0	0	0	0	0	0	0	Relegation round

First match(es) will be played: 19 April 2027. Source:
Rules for classification: 1) points; 2) head-to-head points; 3) head-to-head goal difference; 4) head-to-head number of goals scored; 5) result against closest best-ranked team outside tied teams; 6) result against second-best ranked team outside tied teams; 7) seeding before tournament.

=== Relegation round ===
Team 1	Agg.	Team 2	1st leg	2nd leg
A3		B3	April	April

=== Knockout stage ===
Semi-finals
April
A1
A2
April
B1
B2

Final
April
Third place
April

=== Final standings ===
Pos	Grp	Team	Pld	W	OTW	OTL	L	GF	GA	GD	Pts	Final result
1		TBD	0	0	0	0	0	0	0	0	0	Promoted to 2028 Division II B
2		TBD	0	0	0	0	0	0	0	0	0	Runners-up
3		TBD	0	0	0	0	0	0	0	0	0	Third place
4		TBD	0	0	0	0	0	0	0	0	0	Fourth place
5		TBD	0	0	0	0	0	0	0	0	0	Fifth place
6		TBD	0	0	0	0	0	0	0	0	0	Relegated to 2028 Division III B

First match(es) will be played: 19 April 2027. Source:
Rules for classification: 1) position in the group; 2) number of points; 3) goal difference; 4) goals scored; 5) seeding before tournament.

== Group B tournament ==
2027 IIHF World Championship Division III B
Tournament details
- Host country: TBD
- Venue: 1 (in 1 host city)
- Dates: TBD
- Teams: 6

=== Participants ===
As the Division IV was cancelled last year, no team was relegated.

Team	Qualification
Turkmenistan	Placed 6th in Division III A in 2026 and were relegated.
North Korea	Placed 2nd in Division III B in 2026.
Hong Kong	Placed 3rd in Division III B in 2026.
Luxembourg	Placed 4th in Division III B in 2026.
Mongolia	Placed 5th in Division III B in 2026.
Philippines	Placed 6th in Division III B in 2026.

=== Preliminary round ===
==== Group A ====
Pos	Team	Pld	W	OTW	OTL	L	GF	GA	GD	Pts	Qualification
1	Turkmenistan	0	0	0	0	0	0	0	0	0	Knockout stage
2	Luxembourg	0	0	0	0	0	0	0	0	0	Knockout stage
3	Mongolia	0	0	0	0	0	0	0	0	0	Relegation round

First match(es) will be played: 2027. Source:
Rules for classification: 1) points; 2) head-to-head points; 3) head-to-head goal difference; 4) head-to-head number of goals scored; 5) result against closest best-ranked team outside tied teams; 6) result against second-best ranked team outside tied teams; 7) seeding before tournament.

==== Group B ====
Pos	Team	Pld	W	OTW	OTL	L	GF	GA	GD	Pts	Qualification
1	North Korea	0	0	0	0	0	0	0	0	0	Knockout stage
2	Hong Kong	0	0	0	0	0	0	0	0	0	Knockout stage
3	Philippines	0	0	0	0	0	0	0	0	0	Relegation round

First match(es) will be played: 2027. Source:
Rules for classification: 1) points; 2) head-to-head points; 3) head-to-head goal difference; 4) head-to-head number of goals scored; 5) result against closest best-ranked team outside tied teams; 6) result against second-best ranked team outside tied teams; 7) seeding before tournament.

=== Relegation round ===
Team 1	Agg.	Team 2	1st leg	2nd leg
A3		B3		

=== Knockout stage ===
Semi-finals
A1
A2
B1
B2

Final
Third place

=== Final standings ===
Pos	Team	Pld	W	OTW	OTL	L	GF	GA	GD	Pts	Final result
1	TBD	0	0	0	0	0	0	0	0	0	Promoted to 2028 Division III A
2	TBD	0	0	0	0	0	0	0	0	0	Runners-up
3	TBD	0	0	0	0	0	0	0	0	0	Third place
4	TBD	0	0	0	0	0	0	0	0	0	Fourth place
5	TBD	0	0	0	0	0	0	0	0	0	Fifth place
6	TBD	0	0	0	0	0	0	0	0	0	Relegated to 2028 Division IV A

First match(es) will be played: 2027. Source:
Rules for classification: 1) position in the group; 2) number of points; 3) goal difference; 4) goals scored; 5) seeding before tournament.
