= 2027 IIHF World Championship =

2027 edition of the IIHF World Championship

Tournament details
- Host country: Germany
- Venues: 2 (in 2 host cities)
- Dates: 13–30 May
- Teams: 16

The 2027 IIHF World Championship will be hosted by Düsseldorf, Gelsenkirchen and Mannheim, Germany, from 13 to 30 May 2027.

Finland are the defending champions.

== Host nation bid ==
The only bidders were Kazakhstan and Germany. Norway withdrew its bid in January, four and a half months before the host selection. Austria had also expressed interest.

Bids
Bids	Votes
Germany	102
Kazakhstan	34
Total	136

In the end, on 26 May 2023, the IIHF Congress awarded Germany the rights to host the competition.

== Venues ==
The tournament will be mainly hosted in two venues - PSD Bank Dome in Düsseldorf and SAP Arena in Mannheim, with the latter hosting matches in the 2010 championship. The opening game between Germany and Switzerland will be played in Veltins-Arena in Gelsenkirchen, which was the venue used for the opening game between Germany and USA in 2010.

2027 IIHF World Championship is located in Germany	Düsseldorf	Gelsenkirchen	Mannheim
2027 IIHF World Championship is located in Germany	PSD Bank Dome	Veltins-Arena	SAP Arena
2027 IIHF World Championship is located in Germany	Capacity: 14,282	Capacity: 61,574	Capacity: 13,600

== Participants ==
Team	Qualification method	Appearance(s)				Previous best performance (Note: Bold text indicates they hosted that edition.)	WR
Team	Qualification method	Total (Note: In top division. Results in tiers below are excluded.)	First	Last	Streak	Previous best performance	WR
Germany (H)	Hosts	63rd	1930	2026	20	Runners-up (1930, 1953, 2023)	7
Finland	1st in 2026	73rd	1939	2026	67	Champions (1995, 2011, 2019, 2022, 2026)	4
Switzerland	2nd in 2026	59th	1920	2026	29	Runners-up (1935, 2013, 2018, 2024, 2025, 2026)	1
Norway	3rd in 2026	42nd	1937	2026	21	Third place (2026)	11
Canada	4th in 2026	80th	1920	2026	47	Champions (28 times) (Note: Canada have won in 1920, 1924, 1928, 1930, 1931, 1932, 1934, 1935, 1937, 1938, 1939, 1948, 1950, 1951, 1952, 1955, 1958, 1959, 1961, 1994, 1997, 2003, 2004, 2007, 2015, 2016, 2021 and 2023.)	2
Czechia	5th in 2026	34th	1993	2026	34	Champions (1996, 1999, 2000, 2001, 2005, 2010, 2024)	6
Latvia	6th in 2026	35th	1933	2026	30	Third place (2023)	9
Sweden	7th in 2026	85th	1920	2026	77	Champions (11 times) (Note: Sweden have won in 1953, 1957, 1962, 1987, 1991, 1992, 1998, 2006, 2013, 2017 and 2018.)	5
United States	8th in 2026	78th	1920	2026	41	Champions (1933, 1960, 2025)	3
Slovakia	9th in 2026	31st	1996	2026	31	Champions (2002)	8
Austria	11th in 2026	39th	1928	2026	6	Third place (1931, 1947)	12
Denmark	12th in 2026	25th	1949	2026	24	Fourth place (2025)	10
Slovenia	13th in 2026	13th	2002	2026	3	Thirteenth place (2002, 2005, 2025, 2026)	13
Hungary	14th in 2026	14th	1928	2026	3	Fifth place (1937)	17
Kazakhstan	Top two in Division I	14th	1998	2025	1	Tenth place (2021)	14
Ukraine	Top two in Division I	10th	1999	2007	1	Ninth place (2002)	19

== Russian participation ==
On 30 October 2026, the Court of Arbitration for Sport ordered the IIHF to admit Russian national teams to its 2026–27 tournaments, overturning the exclusion in place since the Russian invasion of Ukraine in 2022. The ruling came after the field and group draw had been finalised, and gave no guidance on how Russia should be added. Host federation Germany said it was considering returning its hosting rights.

=== Boycott by national teams ===
The Finnish federation said it would support any player or official who chose not to take part in games against Russia. On 2 November, the Finnish federation announced they would refuse to play against Russia in the tournament. Following Finland's announcement, Sweden, Denmark, Norway, Latvia, Czechia, Austria and Canada have also announced a boycott of matches against Russia.

- Finland: the Finnish Ice Hockey Association chairman Heikki Hietanen stated that Finland would use all available means to keep Russia out of international competition, "Our own position is that Finland will not play against Russia as long as the war of aggression against Ukraine continues".
- Sweden: the Swedish Ice Hockey Association board officially joined the boycott, asserting in a statement, “The Swedish position is crystal clear... It has been and still is inconceivable for Russia to take part in international ice hockey as long as the war in Ukraine continues. Swedish national teams will not play matches against Russian national teams”.
- Denmark: the Danish Ice Hockey Union confirmed its refusal to play matches against Russia, with federation president Henrik Bach Nielsen stating, “For the sake of the integrity of ice hockey as a sport, we cannot see ourselves playing against Russia as things stand now”.
- Norway: in a statement posted to social media, the Norwegian Ice Hockey Association noted, “Our position that Russia should be excluded from all international championships as long as the war in Ukraine continues…remains unchanged”.
- Latvia: the Latvian Ice Hockey Federation reaffirmed its firm stance against competing with Russian national teams. In an official statement, the federation reiterated that it "strongly opposes the return of Russia and Belarus to international hockey", stating, "As long as the war started by Russia in Ukraine continues, the Latvian hockey teams will not play against the national teams of Russia and Belarus".
- Czech Republic: joining the stance of other European federations, the Czech Ice Hockey Association declared that its national teams would refuse to play against Russia. Following a cabinet meeting, Czech prime minister Andrej Babiš expressed the government's stance against Russia's return to the World Championship, stating, "It makes no sense to me as long as the war in Ukraine continues. It would create the impression that war and killing are normal, which we reject".
- Austria: Alexander Hellwig, Managing Director of the Austrian Ice Hockey Association, stated "At the moment, we will not play against Russia in any case".
- Ukraine: Ukrainian foreign minister Andrii Sybiha thanked European nations for "refusing to share the ice with Russia", adding, "If the Court of Arbitration for Sport lacks a moral compass, let's show that hockey still has values... Refuse to play against Russia and deny visas to its players. Keep Russia off the ice! A war of aggression and hockey are incompatible".
- Canada: Canadian prime minister Mark Carney announced that Russia would not be allowed to participate in upcoming tournaments hosted in Canada, stating, "We respect the decisions of the Finns, the Czechs, the Swedes, and other nations, but this is a decision we take on our own".

=== Rejection of boycott ===
- Kazakhstan: the Kazakhstan Hockey Federation explicitly denied media reports that it supported a boycott of Russian hockey players. Executive Director Rustam Ibrayev clarified in an official statement: “This information is not true. Kazakhstan is a full member of the IIHF and conducts its activities in strict accordance with its statutes and regulations... The Kazakhstan Hockey Federation consistently advocates the development of international cooperation, fair sporting competition, and equal conditions for all participants”.
- Slovakia: Slovakia welcomed the potential return of Russian players. Slovak Prime Minister Robert Fico stated that Russian players are among the best in the world and that their participation is crucial for the level of competition, “I have always been against dragging politics into sports. And I have always asked what value a gold medal has if, on the way to it, one does not also have to defeat Russian hockey players, who undoubtedly belong among the best in the world”.

=== Withdrawal of sponsorship ===
Swedish sponsor AJ Produkter, a partner of the championship since 1989, announced it would remove all ads, including logos from the referees' uniforms, and Czech sponsor Tipsport said it did not want its advertising shown during games involving Russia.

Škoda Auto, the championship's main sponsor since 1993, announced on 4 November 2026 that it would reassess its involvement in the tournament and take further action if the Russian national team was allowed to participate, stating that Russia's ongoing aggression against Ukraine made its return incompatible with the company's values.

== Seeding ==
The seedings in the preliminary round was based on the 2026 IIHF World Ranking, at the end of the 2026 IIHF World Championship, using the serpentine system while allowing the organizers, "to allocate a maximum of two teams to separate groups", which they used, because Slovakia was originally supposed to be in Group A and Germany in Group B.

Group A (Mannheim)

- Switzerland (1)
- Finland (4)
- Sweden (5)
- Germany (7)
- Latvia (9)
- Austria (12)
- Slovenia (13)
- Ukraine (19)

Group B (Düsseldorf)

- Canada (2)
- United States (3)
- Czechia (6)
- Slovakia (8)
- Denmark (10)
- Norway (11)
- Kazakhstan (14)
- Hungary (17)

== Preliminary round ==
The groups were announced on 8 June 2026, with the schedule being revealed on 7 September 2026.

=== Group A ===
Pos	Team	Pld	W	OTW	OTL	L	GF	GA	GD	Pts	Qualification or relegation
1	Switzerland	0	0	0	0	0	0	0	0	0	Quarterfinals
1	Finland	0	0	0	0	0	0	0	0	0	Quarterfinals
1	Sweden	0	0	0	0	0	0	0	0	0	Quarterfinals
1	Germany (H)	0	0	0	0	0	0	0	0	0	Quarterfinals
1	Latvia	0	0	0	0	0	0	0	0	0	Qualified for the 2028 IIHF World Championship
1	Austria	0	0	0	0	0	0	0	0	0	Qualified for the 2028 IIHF World Championship
1	Slovenia	0	0	0	0	0	0	0	0	0	Qualified for the 2028 IIHF World Championship
1	Ukraine	0	0	0	0	0	0	0	0	0	Relegated to the 2028 Division I A

First match(es) will be played: 13 May 2027. Source:
Rules for classification: 1) points; 2) head-to-head points; 3) head-to-head goal difference; 4) head-to-head number of goals scored; 5) result against closest best-ranked team outside tied teams; 6) result against second-best-ranked team outside tied teams; 7) seeding before tournament
(H) Host

13 May 2027
Switzerland	v	Germany
14 May 2027
Ukraine	v	Sweden
Finland	v	Latvia
15 May 2027
Switzerland	v	Slovenia
Austria	v	Germany
16 May 2027
Sweden	v	Latvia
Switzerland	v	Finland
Germany	v	Ukraine
17 May 2027
Slovenia	v	Sweden
Austria	v	Finland
18 May 2027
Ukraine	v	Austria
Latvia	v	Switzerland
19 May 2027
Germany	v	Finland
Slovenia	v	Ukraine
20 May 2027
Sweden	v	Austria
Germany	v	Slovenia
21 May 2027
Latvia	v	Ukraine
Sweden	v	Switzerland
22 May 2027
Austria	v	Slovenia
Latvia	v	Germany
Finland	v	Ukraine
23 May 2027
Switzerland	v	Austria
Finland	v	Sweden
24 May 2027
Slovenia	v	Latvia
Ukraine	v	Switzerland
25 May 2027
Finland	v	Slovenia
Latvia	v	Austria
Germany	v	Sweden

=== Group B ===
Pos	Team	Pld	W	OTW	OTL	L	GF	GA	GD	Pts	Qualification or relegation
1	Canada	0	0	0	0	0	0	0	0	0	Quarterfinals
1	United States	0	0	0	0	0	0	0	0	0	Quarterfinals
1	Czechia	0	0	0	0	0	0	0	0	0	Quarterfinals
1	Slovakia	0	0	0	0	0	0	0	0	0	Quarterfinals
1	Denmark	0	0	0	0	0	0	0	0	0	Qualified for the 2028 IIHF World Championship
1	Norway	0	0	0	0	0	0	0	0	0	Qualified for the 2028 IIHF World Championship
1	Kazakhstan	0	0	0	0	0	0	0	0	0	Qualified for the 2028 IIHF World Championship
1	Hungary	0	0	0	0	0	0	0	0	0	Relegated to the 2028 Division I A

First match(es) will be played: 14 May 2027. Source:
Rules for classification: 1) points; 2) head-to-head points; 3) head-to-head goal difference; 4) head-to-head number of goals scored; 5) result against closest best-ranked team outside tied teams; 6) result against second-best-ranked team outside tied teams; 7) seeding before tournament

14 May 2027
Czech Republic	v	Norway
Canada	v	United States
15 May 2027
Slovakia	v	Denmark
Kazakhstan	v	Czechia
Hungary	v	Canada
16 May 2027
Slovakia	v	Kazakhstan
Hungary	v	Denmark
Norway	v	United States
17 May 2027
Canada	v	Norway
United States	v	Czechia
18 May 2027
Kazakhstan	v	Denmark
Slovakia	v	Hungary
19 May 2027
United States	v	Kazakhstan
Czechia	v	Hungary
20 May 2027
Canada	v	Slovakia
Denmark	v	Norway
21 May 2027
Canada	v	Kazakhstan
United States	v	Hungary
22 May 2027
Norway	v	Kazakhstan
Denmark	v	Czechia
Slovakia	v	United States
23 May 2027
Hungary	v	Norway
Denmark	v	Canada
24 May 2027
Kazakhstan	v	Hungary
Czechia	v	Slovakia
25 May 2027
United States	v	Denmark
Norway	v	Slovakia
Czechia	v	Canada

== Playoff round ==
Teams will be reseeded after the quarterfinals.

Quarter-finals
27 May
1A
4B
27 May
1B
4A
27 May
2A
3B
27 May
2B
3A

Semi-finals
29 May
29 May

Final
30 May
Third place
30 May

=== Final ===
30 May 2027; 20:20	WSF1	v	WSF2	PSD Bank Dome, Düsseldorf

== Final standings ==
Teams finishing fifth in the preliminary round will be ranked ninth and tenth, teams finishing sixth were ranked 11th and 12th, and so on.

Pos	Grp	Team	Pld	W	OTW	OTL	L	GF	GA	GD	Pts	Final Result
1		TBD	0	0	0	0	0	0	0	0	0	Champions
2		TBD	0	0	0	0	0	0	0	0	0	Runners-up
3		TBD	0	0	0	0	0	0	0	0	0	Third place
4		TBD	0	0	0	0	0	0	0	0	0	Fourth place
5		TBD	0	0	0	0	0	0	0	0	0	Eliminated in Quarterfinals
6		TBD	0	0	0	0	0	0	0	0	0	Eliminated in Quarterfinals
7		TBD	0	0	0	0	0	0	0	0	0	Eliminated in Quarterfinals
8		TBD	0	0	0	0	0	0	0	0	0	Eliminated in Quarterfinals
9		TBD	0	0	0	0	0	0	0	0	0	Eliminated in Preliminary round
10		TBD	0	0	0	0	0	0	0	0	0	Eliminated in Preliminary round
11		TBD	0	0	0	0	0	0	0	0	0	Eliminated in Preliminary round
12		TBD	0	0	0	0	0	0	0	0	0	Eliminated in Preliminary round
13		TBD	0	0	0	0	0	0	0	0	0	Eliminated in Preliminary round
14		TBD	0	0	0	0	0	0	0	0	0	Eliminated in Preliminary round
15		TBD	0	0	0	0	0	0	0	0	0	Relegated to 2028 Division I A
16		TBD	0	0	0	0	0	0	0	0	0	Relegated to 2028 Division I A

First match(es) will be played: 13 May 2027. Source:
Rules for classification: 1) position in the group; 2) number of points; 3) goal difference; 4) goals scored; 5) seeding before tournament.
