= PSD Bank Dome =

Sports arena in Düsseldorf, Germany

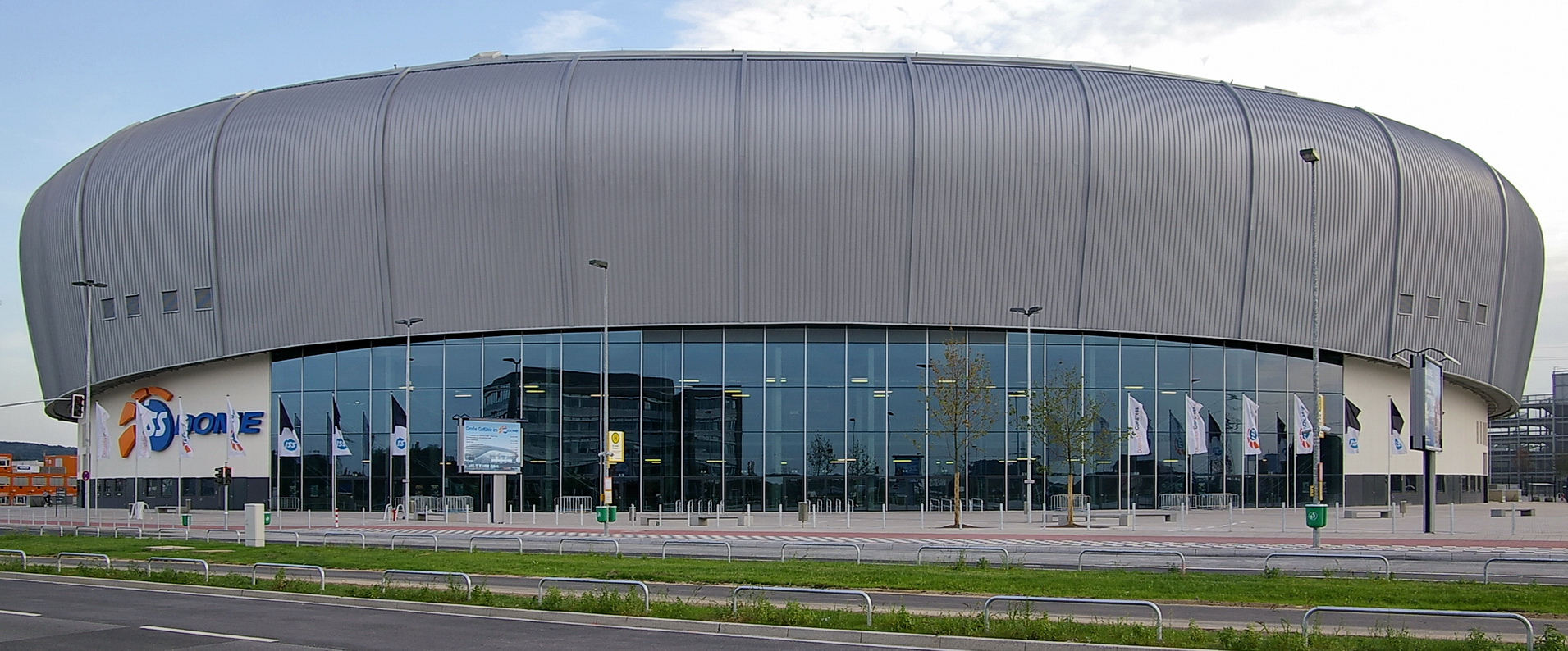
- Interactive map of PSD Bank Dome
- Former names: ISS Dome (2006–2021)
- Location: Düsseldorf, Germany
- Coordinates: 51°16′19″N 6°48′41″E
- Operator: Düsseldorf Congress Sport & Event GmbH
- Capacity: 14,282 (hockey); 15,151 (maximum)

Construction
- Groundbreaking: 19 May 2005
- Opened: 2 September 2006
- Cost: € 70 million
- Architect: RKW Architektur + Städtebau

Tenant
- Düsseldorfer EG (DEL) (2006–present)

PSD Bank Dome, originally branded ISS Dome, is a multi-use indoor arena in Düsseldorf, Germany. The arena, which opened in 2006, has a maximum capacity of 15,151 and mainly hosts sports events and concerts.

== Usage ==
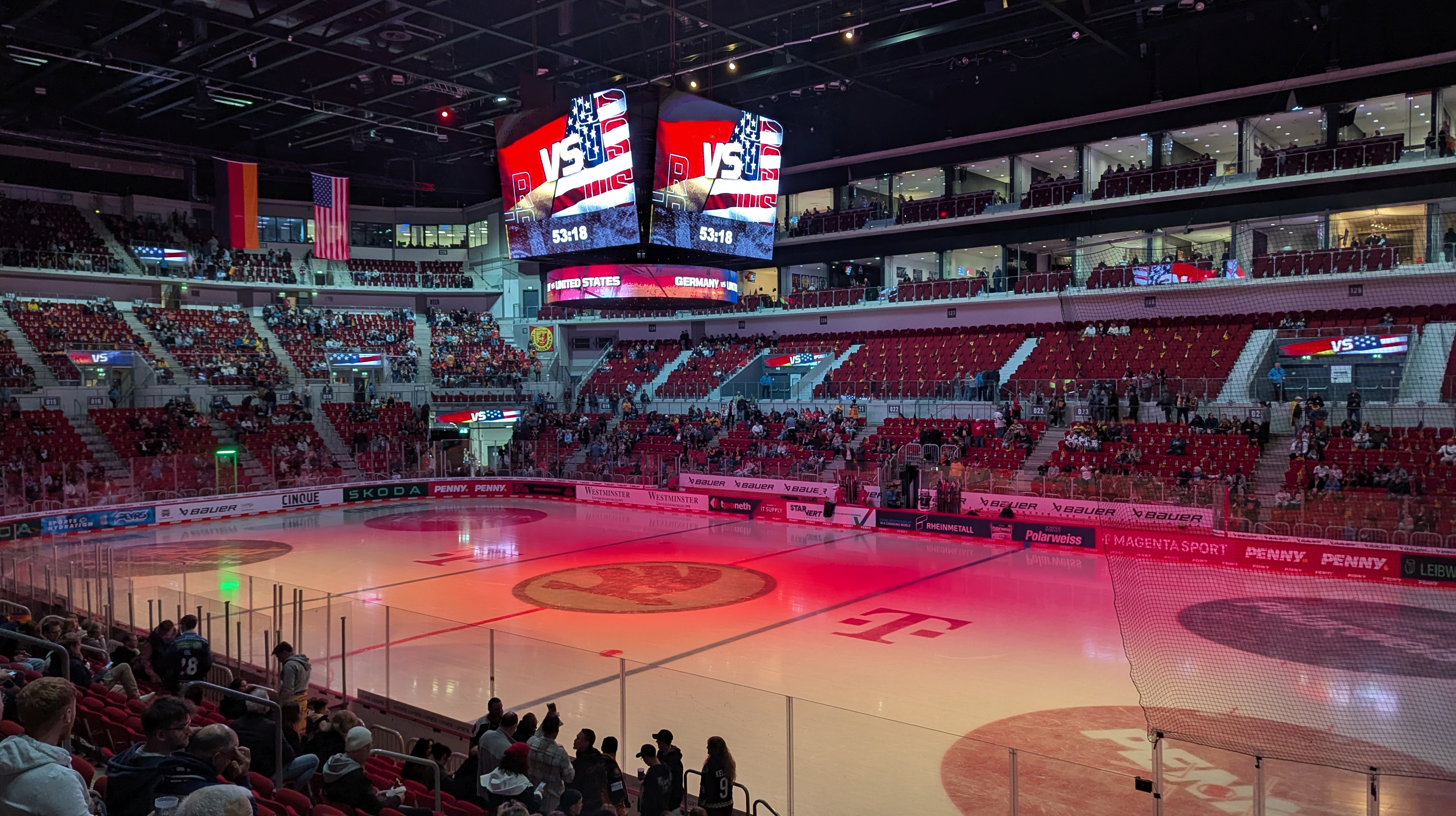
Interior view

The venue is used mostly for ice hockey matches, as well as concerts. Its home team is the Düsseldorfer EG. Furthermore, the arena will host the gymnastica artistics and the final phase of the basketball tournaments during 2025 Summer World University Games and some matches of the 2027 IIHF World Championship. PSD Bank Dome was also the host venue of the 2022–23 Rocket League World Championship. The National Hockey League will play two regular season games on 18 and 20 December 2026 between the Ottawa Senators and Chicago Blackhawks, as part of the NHL's Global Series.

Major artists performing at PSD Bank Dome included Kylie Minogue, Pharrell Williams, David Guetta, Slipknot, Peter Gabriel, Pearl Jam, Duran Duran, Lenny Kravitz, AC/DC, Foo Fighters, Elton John, P!nk, Rammstein, Robbie Williams, Rod Stewart, Eric Clapton, Die Toten Hosen, Tame Impala and Beyoncé amongst others.

== Public transport ==
The PSD Bank Dome is connected directly via the Rheinbahn tram line 701, station PSD Bank Dome and Rheinbahn bus lines 756, 758, station Dome / Am Hülserhof. Furthermore, there are connections to the suburban rail S-Bahn Rhein-Ruhr serving Düsseldorf main station as well as nearby major cities Duisburg, Essen, Dortmund and Cologne.

== See also ==
- List of indoor arenas in Germany
- List of European ice hockey arenas
