= 2028 IIHF World Championship =

2028 edition of the IIHF World Championship

Tournament details
- Host country: France
- Venues: 2 (in 2 host cities)
- Dates: 12–28 May
- Teams: 16

The 2028 IIHF World Championship will be hosted in Paris and Lyon, France, from 12 to 28 May 2028, as they were the only bid to host this championship.

== Host nation bids ==
These were the bids:

- France
- Kazakhstan (withdrew)
- Norway (withdrew)

On 24 May 2024, during the IIHF General Assembly in Prague, France was confirmed as the host.

=== France ===
On 5 September 2023, the French Federation confirmed their plans to host the World Championship for the first time since 2017, with matches in Paris and Lyon after discussions about a potential co-host with Great Britain fell through. In January 2024, their application was officially submitted.

These are the venues for the French bid:

- Paris – Accor Arena, capacity 15,000
- Lyon – LDLC Arena, capacity 12,500

=== Kazakhstan ===
On 9 February 2024, Kazakhstan filed another bid for the championship after losing to Germany for 2027. Similar to 2027, the proposed venues were in Astana and Almaty. The bid was withdrawn before the final decision on 9 May.

These were the venues for the Kazakh bid:

- Almaty – Almaty Arena, capacity 12,000
- Astana – Barys Arena, capacity 11,578

=== Norway ===
After withdrawing from the 2027 bidding process, Norway considered bidding for 2028. However, this did not materialise due to financial reasons.

== Venues ==
Paris	2028 IIHF World Championship is located in France	Lyon
Accor Arena	2028 IIHF World Championship is located in France	LDLC Arena
Capacity: 15,000	2028 IIHF World Championship is located in France	Capacity: 12,500

== Participants ==
Qualified as hosts

- France

Automatic qualifier after a top 14 placement at the 2027 IIHF World Championship

- (N/A) TBD
- (N/A) TBD
- (N/A) TBD
- (N/A) TBD
- (N/A) TBD
- (N/A) TBD
- (N/A) TBD
- (N/A) TBD
- (N/A) TBD
- (N/A) TBD
- (N/A) TBD
- (N/A) TBD
- (N/A) TBD

Qualified through winning a promotion at the 2027 IIHF World Championship Division I

- (N/A) TBD
