= Ukraine men's national ice hockey team =

Ukraine
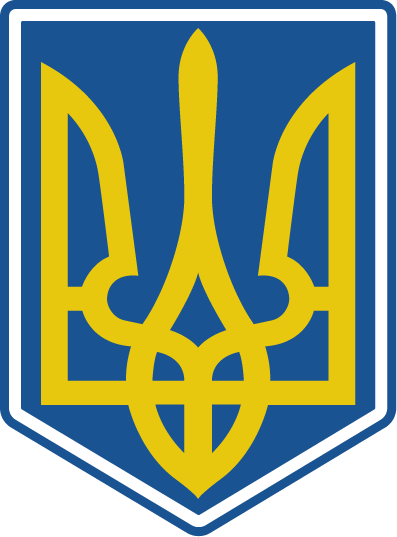
- Nickname: Yellow and Blue (Жовто-сині / Zhovto-syni)
- Association: Ice Hockey Federation of Ukraine
- General manager: Olexander Butkevych
- Head coach: Dmitri Khristich
- Assistants: Igor Karpenko; Oleg Shafarenko; Oleg Zadoyenko
- Captain: Igor Merezhko
- Most games: Vasily Bobrovnikov (182)
- Top scorer: Vadym Shakhraychuk (42)
- Most points: Alexander Peresunko (90)
- Team colors
- IIHF code: UKR

Ranking
- Current IIHF: 19 ▲3 (3 June 2026)
- Highest IIHF: 11 (2003, 2005)
- Lowest IIHF: 28 (2022)

First international
- Kazakhstan 5–1 Ukraine (Saint Petersburg, Russia; 14 April 1992)

Biggest win
- Ukraine 37–2 Belgium (Bled, Slovenia; 13 March 1993)

Biggest defeat
- Finland 9–0 Ukraine (Helsinki, Finland; 3 May 2003)

Olympics
- Appearances: 1 (first in 2002)

IIHF World Championships
- Appearances: 32 (first in 1993)
- Best result: 9th (2002)

International record (W–L–T)
- 197–192–27

The Ukrainian national ice hockey team (Ukrainian: Збірна України з хокею з шайбою) is the national men's ice hockey team of Ukraine, and is controlled by the Ice Hockey Federation of Ukraine, and a member of the International Ice Hockey Federation (IIHF). Ukraine is currently ranked 27th in the world by the IIHF as of the 2020 IIHF World Ranking, while their highest IIHF ranking is 11th.

== History ==
As part of the Soviet Union, Ukraine played internationally from 1954 to 1991. Ukrainian hockey came to prominence in 1985, when Sokil Kyiv won bronze medals in that year's the Soviet hockey championship. However, at the time most of the club's players were ethnic Russians. At the end of the 1980s Sokil's school produced many players for Soviet youth teams. Ukrainian player Dmytro Khrystych became a 1990 world champion, and his compatriot Oleksiy Zhytnyk won the 1992 Olympic ice hockey tournament as part of the Soviet Union team.

Ukraine made its international hockey debut as an independent country in 1992. However, development of ice hockey was seen as a low-priority issue by Ukraine's sports minister Valeriy Borzov, and the national team spent its first years in lower divisions, only reaching the highest league in 1998. During its early history, the Ukrainian team had to play international games abroad, holding its first home match only in 1999. Despite this, Ukraine kept its place in the top league of world hockey for several seasons, and in 2002 qualified for the olympic games. The team's top finish was at the 2002 World Championships when they finished in ninth place. Following the 2007 World Championship, Ukraine was relegated to Division I.

Due to the national federation's decision to introduce an age limit of 25 years for national league players, during the 2000s more than 100 Ukrainian hockey players were forced to retire or go abroad, meanwhile clubs were forced to invite young players from other countries, mostly from Russia. In order to provide themselves better career chances, many Ukrainian players adopted foreign citizenship during that time. As a consequence, in 2017 Ukraine was degraded to the 3rd level of international hockey league, and in 2019 barely escaped elimination to the fourth division. After that, the age limit was finally removed by Ukrainian hockey authorities.

Following the 2022 Russian invasion of Ukraine, Ukrainian hockey players took part in training sessions in Switzerland, the Czech Republic and Hungary. As a result, the Ukrainian team was able to take 3rd place in Division I of the 2022 Men's Ice Hockey World Championships. In 2024 Ukraine returned to the Division 1A for the first time since 2017. In 2027, Ukraine returned to the top division for the first time in 20 years.

== Tournament record ==
=== Olympic Games ===
Games	GP	W	OW	T	OL	L	GF	GA	Coach	Captain	Finish	Rank
(Switzerland) 1928 St. Moritz	As part of the Soviet Union											
(United States) 1932 Lake Placid	As part of the Soviet Union											
(Nazi Germany) 1936 Garmisch-Partenkirchen	As part of the Soviet Union											
(Switzerland) 1948 St. Moritz	As part of the Soviet Union											
(Norway) 1952 Oslo	As part of the Soviet Union											
(Italy) 1956 Cortina d'Ampezzo	As part of the Soviet Union											
(United States) 1960 Squaw Valley	As part of the Soviet Union											
(Austria) 1964 Innsbruck	As part of the Soviet Union											
(France) 1968 Grenoble	As part of the Soviet Union											
(Japan) 1972 Sapporo	As part of the Soviet Union											
(Austria) 1976 Innsbruck	As part of the Soviet Union											
(United States) 1980 Lake Placid	As part of the Soviet Union											
(Socialist Federal Republic of Yugoslavia) 1984 Sarajevo	As part of the Soviet Union											
(Canada) 1988 Calgary	As part of the Soviet Union											
(France) 1992 Albertville	As part of the Unified Team at the 1992 Winter Olympics											
(Norway) 1994 Lillehammer	Did not qualify											
(Japan) 1998 Nagano	Did not qualify											
(United States) 2002 Salt Lake City	3	2	0	0	0	1	9	5	(Ukraine) Anatoliy Bohdanov	Oleksandr Savytskyi	9th-place game	10th
(Italy) 2006 Turin	Did not qualify											
(Canada) 2010 Vancouver	Did not qualify											
(Russia) 2014 Sochi	Did not qualify											
(South Korea) 2018 Pyeongchang	Did not qualify											
(China) 2022 Beijing	Did not qualify											
(Italy) 2026 Milan–Cortina	Did not qualify											
(France) 2030 French Alps	To be determined											

=== World Championship ===
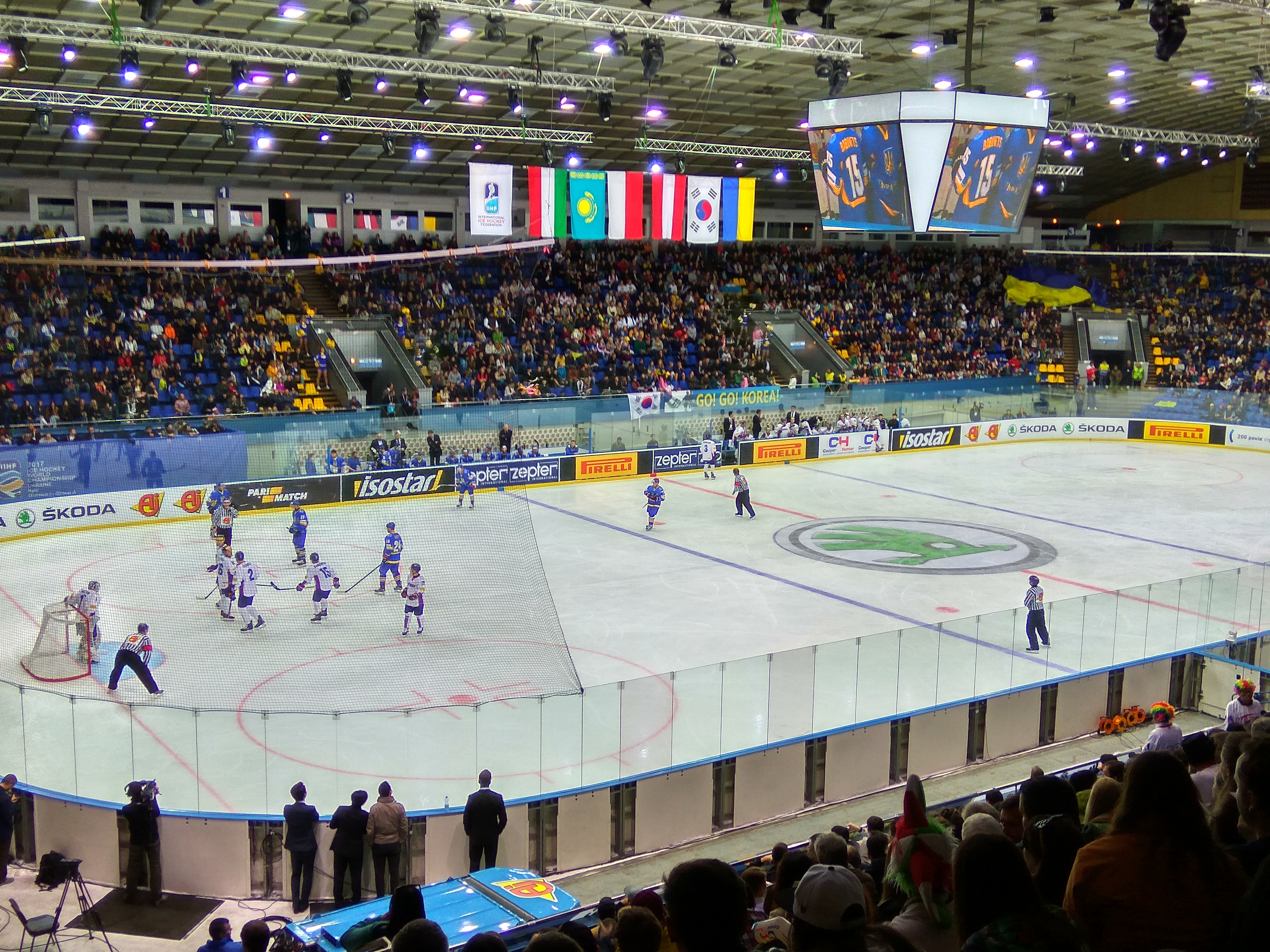
2017 IIHF World Championship Division I South Korea against Ukraine

Championship	Finish	Rank
1954 – 1991	As part of Soviet Union / Ukrainian SSR	
(Slovenia) 1993 Men's World Ice Hockey Championships	2nd in Pool C	18th
(Slovakia) 1994 Men's World Ice Hockey Championships	3rd in Pool C1	23rd
(Bulgaria) 1995 Men's World Ice Hockey Championships	3rd in Pool C1	23rd
(Slovenia) 1996 Men's World Ice Hockey Championships	2nd in Pool C	22nd
(Estonia) 1997 Men's World Ice Hockey Championships	1st in Pool C, promoted to Pool B	21st
(Slovenia) 1998 Men's World Ice Hockey Championships	1st in Pool B, promoted to Pool A	17th
(Norway) 1999 Men's World Ice Hockey Championships	First round	14th
(Russia) 2000 Men's World Ice Hockey Championships	Preliminary round	14th
(Germany) 2001 Men's Ice Hockey World Championships	Second round	10th
(Sweden) 2002 Men's Ice Hockey World Championships	Second round	9th
(Finland) 2003 Men's Ice Hockey World Championships	Second round	12th
(Czech Republic) 2004 Men's World Ice Hockey Championships	Preliminary round	14th
(Austria) 2005 Men's World Ice Hockey Championships	Qualifying round	11th
(Latvia) 2006 Men's World Ice Hockey Championships	Qualifying round	12th
(Russia) 2007 Men's World Ice Hockey Championships	Preliminary round (relegated to Division I)	16th
(Japan) 2008 IIHF World Championship Division I	2nd in Division I Group B	19th
(Poland) 2009 IIHF World Championship Division I	2nd in Division I Group B	20th
(Netherlands) 2010 IIHF World Championship Division I	2nd in Division I Group A	19th
(Ukraine) 2011 IIHF World Championship Division I	2nd in Division I Group A	19th
(Slovenia) 2012 IIHF World Championship Division I	6th in Division I Group A, relegated to Division I Group B	22nd
(Ukraine) 2013 IIHF World Championship Division I	1st in Division I Group B, promoted to Division I Group A	23rd
(South Korea) 2014 IIHF World Championship Division I	4th in Division I Group A	20th
(Poland) 2015 IIHF World Championship Division I	6th in Division I Group A, relegated to Division I Group B	22nd
(Croatia) 2016 IIHF World Championship Division I	1st in Division I Group B, promoted to Division I Group A	23rd
(Ukraine) 2017 IIHF World Championship Division I	6th in Division I Group A, relegated to Division I Group B	22nd
(Lithuania) 2018 IIHF World Championship Division I	4th in Division I Group B	26th
(Estonia) 2019 IIHF World Championship Division I	5th in Division I Group B	27th
~~(Poland) 2020 IIHF World Championship Division I~~	Cancelled due to the COVID-19 pandemic	
~~(Poland) 2021 IIHF World Championship Division I~~	Cancelled due to the COVID-19 pandemic	
(Poland) 2022 IIHF World Championship Division I	3rd in Division I Group B	24th
(Estonia) 2023 IIHF World Championship Division I	2nd in Division I Group B	24th
(Lithuania) 2024 IIHF World Championship Division I	1st in Division I Group B, promoted to Division I Group A	23rd
(Romania) 2025 IIHF World Championship Division I	3rd in Division I Group A	19th
(Poland) 2026 IIHF World Championship Division I	2nd in Division I, Group A, promoted to Top Division	18th
(Germany) 2027 IIHF World Championship	TBD	TBD

== Coaches ==
- (Ukraine) Oleksandr Fadeiev (1993–1994)
- (Ukraine) Anatoliy Bohdanov (1994–2003)
- (Ukraine) Oleksandr Seukand (2004–2007)
- (Russia) Vladimir Golubovych (2007–2008)
- (Ukraine) Oleksandr Seukand (2009)
- (Belarus) Mikhail Zakharov (2009–2010)
- (Canada) Dave Lewis (2010–2011)
- (Ukraine) Anatoliy Khomenko (2011–2012)
- (Ukraine) Oleksandr Kulikov (2012–2013)
- (Russia) Andrei Nazarov (2013–2014)
- (Ukraine) / (United States) Oleksandr Hodyniuk (2014–15)
- (Ukraine) Oleksandr Savytskyi (2015–2018)
- (Ukraine) Andriy Sryubko (2018–2019)
- (Ukraine) / (Belarus) Sergei Viter (2019–2020)
- (Ukraine) Vadym Shakhraychuk (2021–2023)
- (Ukraine) Dmitri Khristich (2023–present)

== All-time record ==
Overtime and game winning shot victories and losses are counted towards wins and losses. Teams in italics are no longer actively competing.

As of 7 November 2025.

Opponent	Played	Won	Drawn	Lost	GF	GA	GD
Austria	20	6	1	13	52	67	–15
Belgium	1	1	0	0	37	2	+35
Belarus	25	5	5	15	47	88	–41
Bulgaria	2	2	0	0	48	0	+48
Canada	1	0	0	1	1	2	−1
China	5	4	0	1	36	8	+28
Croatia	9	8	0	1	56	7	+49
Czech Republic	1	0	0	1	2	5	−3
Denmark	11	5	3	3	30	29	+1
Estonia	18	16	0	2	93	27	+66
Finland	7	0	0	7	4	36	−32
France	17	6	0	11	49	48	+1
Germany	7	2	2	3	15	18	–3
Great Britain	8	5	1	2	35	15	+20
Hungary	29	17	0	12	95	65	+30
Israel	1	1	0	0	29	0	+29
Italy	12	4	0	8	24	34	–10
Japan	18	8	2	8	45	44	+1
Kazakhstan	22	6	3	13	50	75	–25
Latvia	19	3	2	14	34	65	–31
Lithuania	13	10	0	3	62	25	+37
Netherlands	13	13	0	0	81	17	+64
Norway	9	5	1	3	27	26	+1
North Korea	1	1	0	0	15	2	+13
Poland	47	25	2	20	140	123	+17
Romania	23	19	0	4	125	25	+100
Russia	8	0	1	7	12	41	−29
Serbia	3	3	0	0	29	2	+27
Serbia and Montenegro (Note: Consists of matches under the name of Federal Republic of Yugoslavia)	3	3	0	0	47	4	+43
Slovakia	10	0	1	9	18	49	–31
Slovenia	15	5	2	8	43	48	–5
South Korea	7	5	0	2	38	14	+24
Spain	2	2	0	0	13	1	+12
Sweden	5	0	0	5	6	26	–20
Switzerland	4	1	0	3	7	10	–3
United States	3	0	1	2	5	14	–9
Total	398	183	27	187	1 449	1 620	+387

== Gallery ==
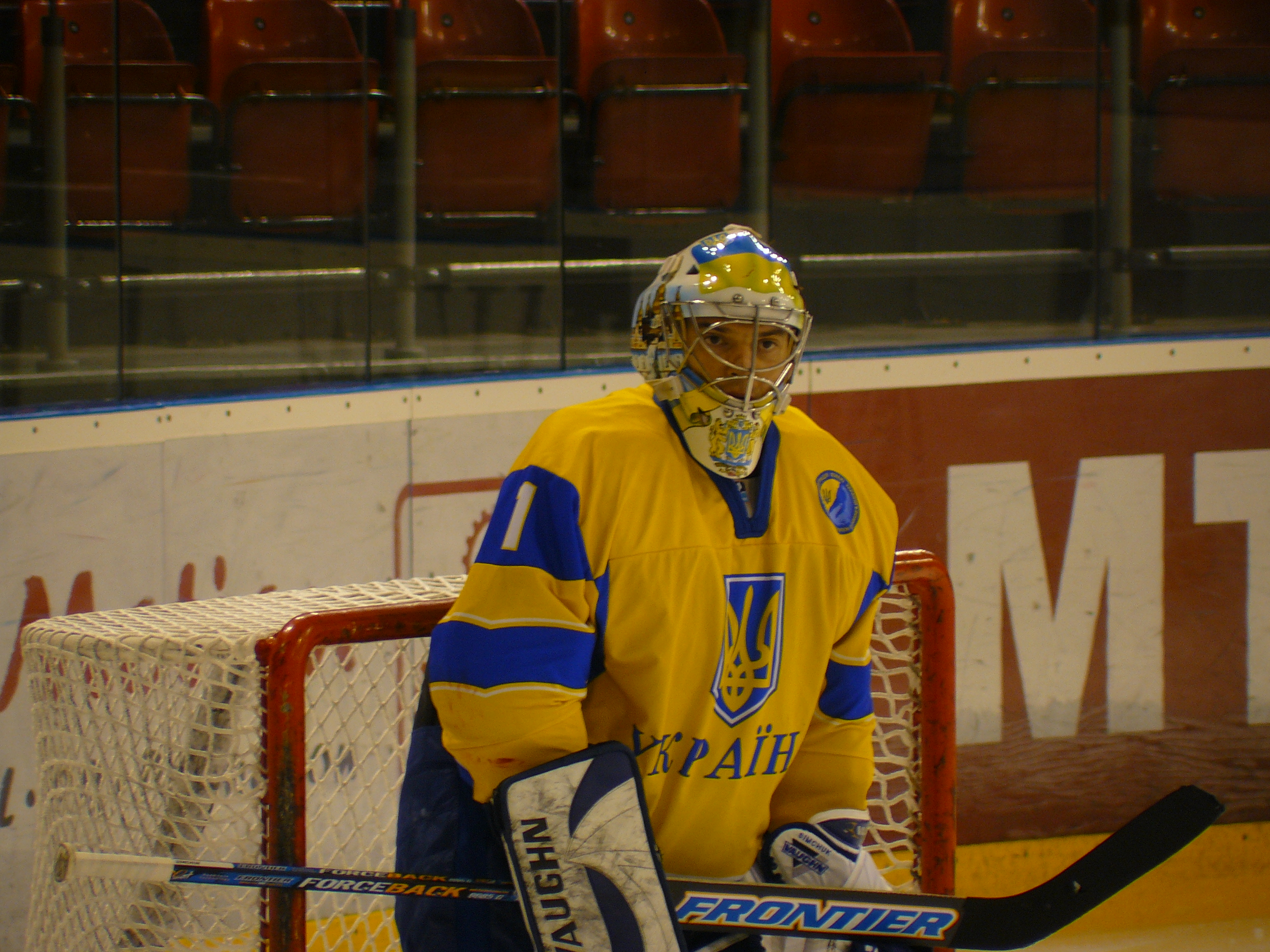
Kostiantyn Simchuk

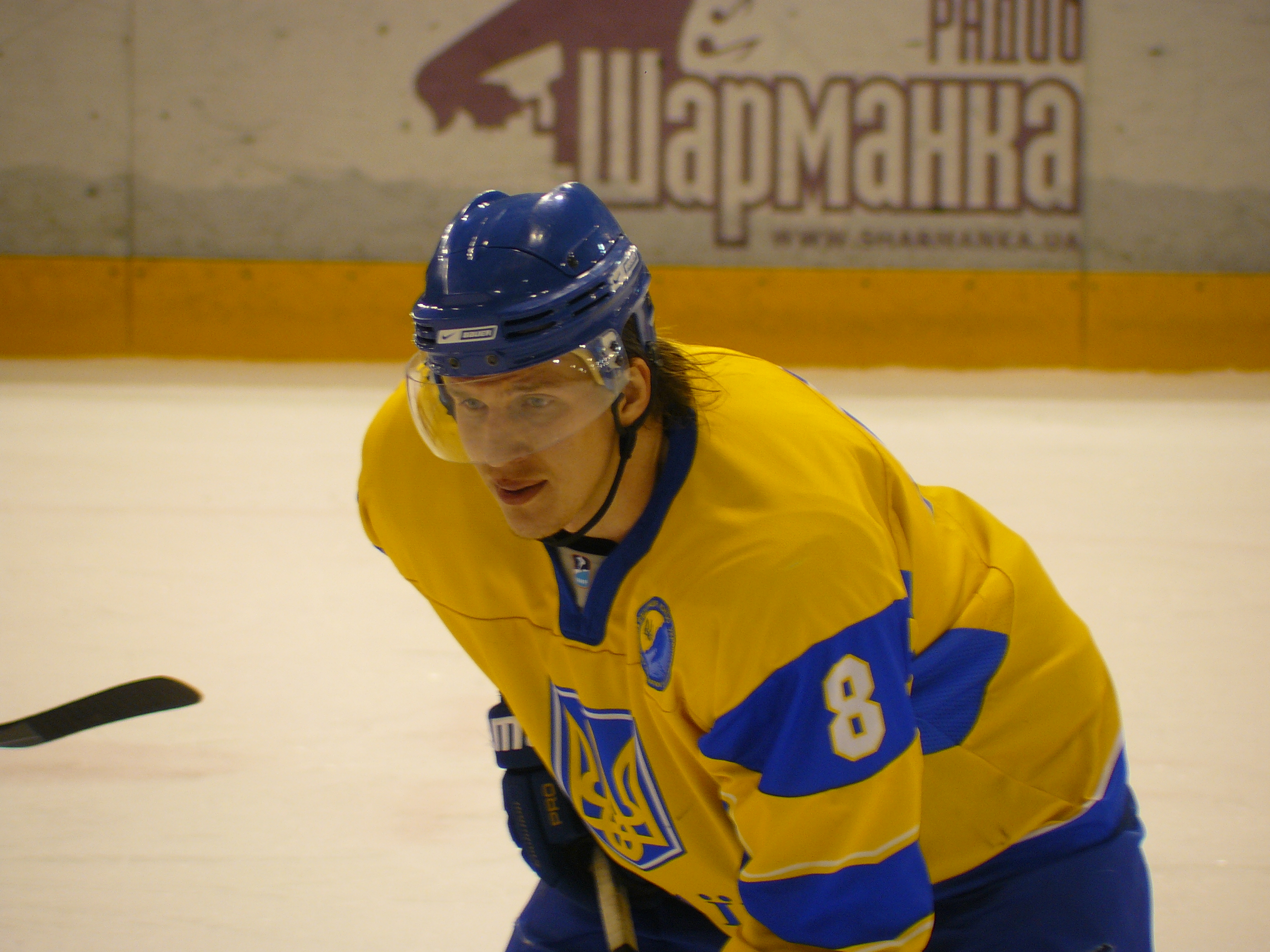
Andriy Mikhnov

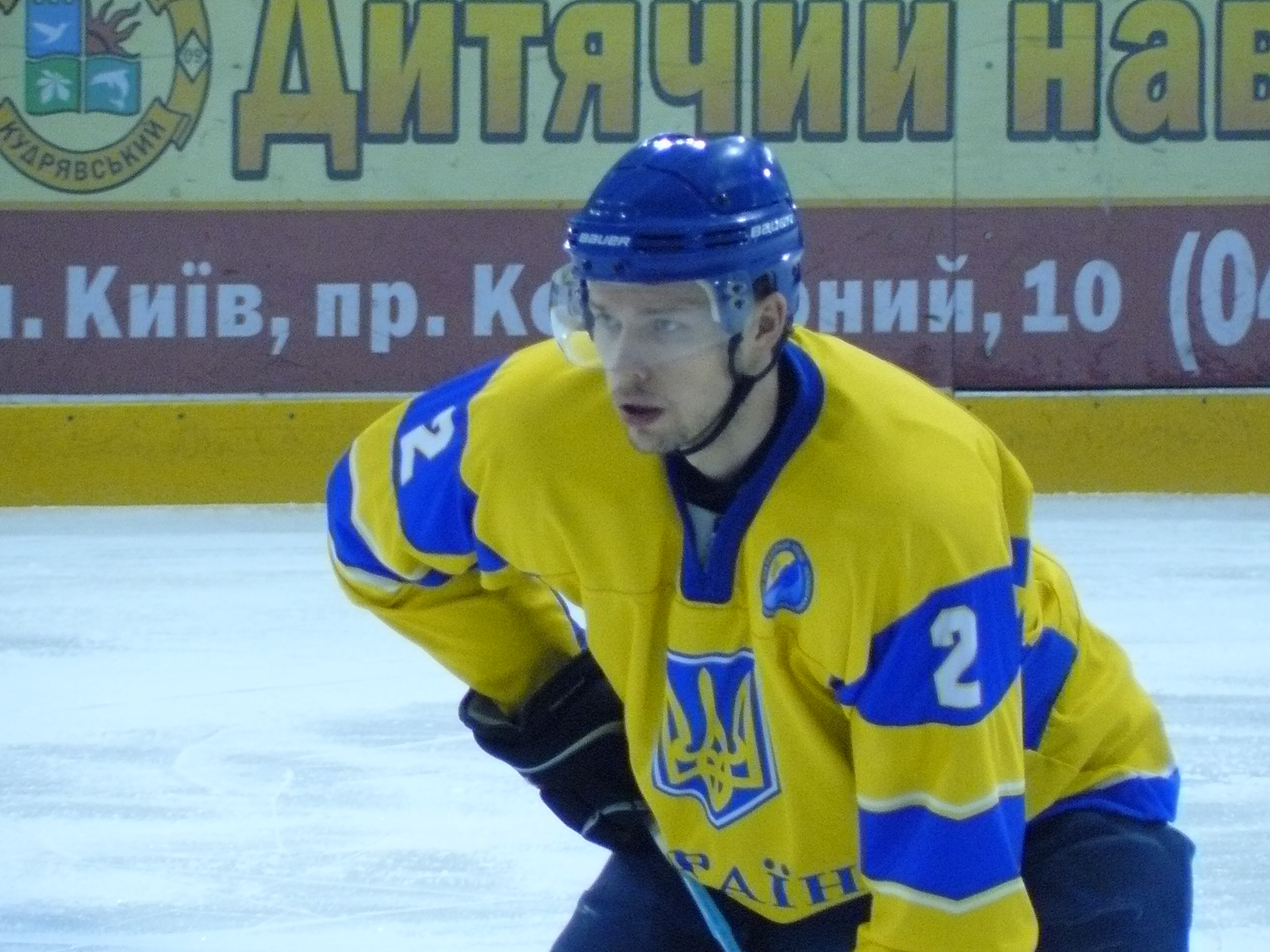
Mykola Ladygin

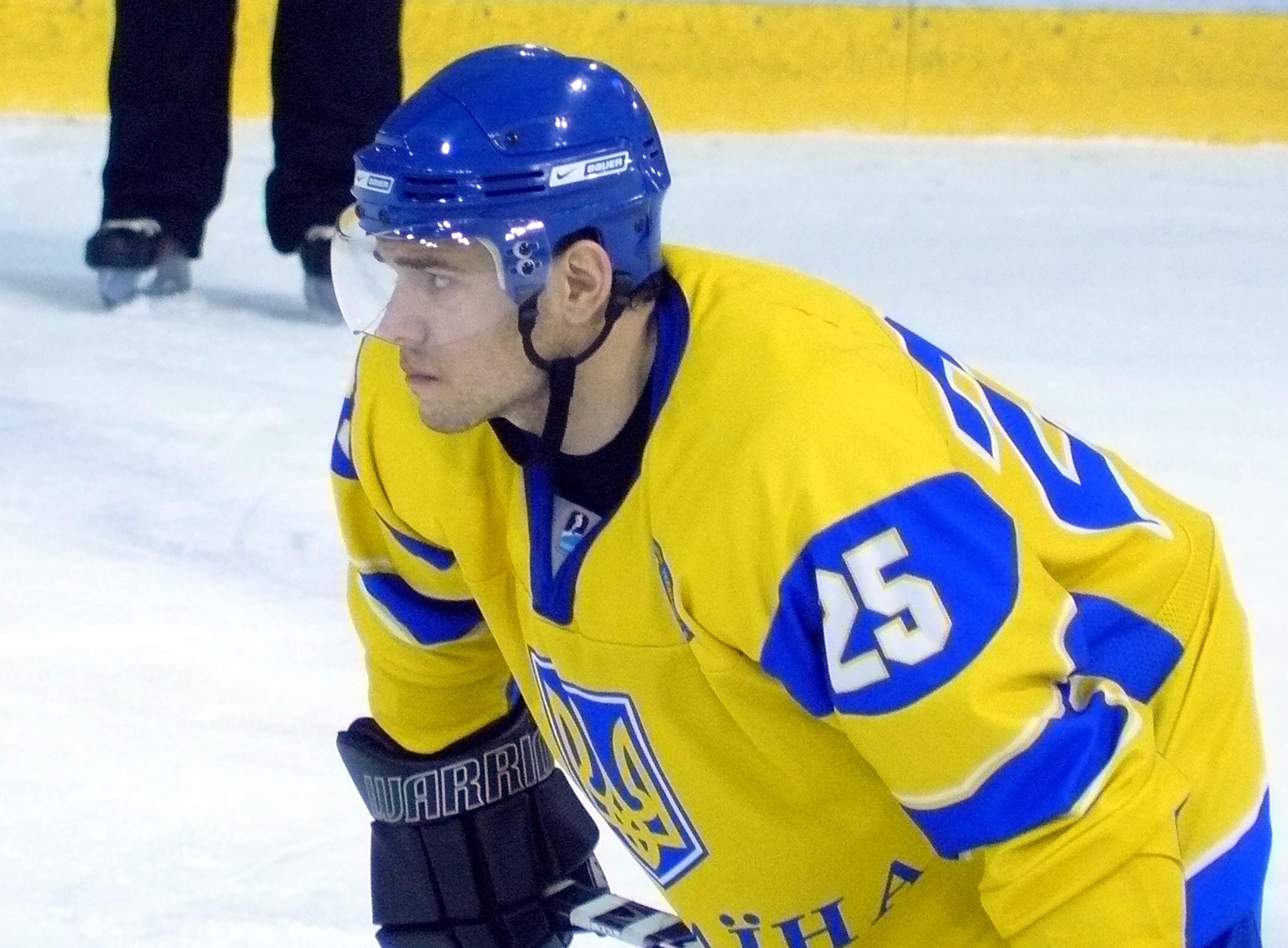
Oleksandr Pobyedonostsev

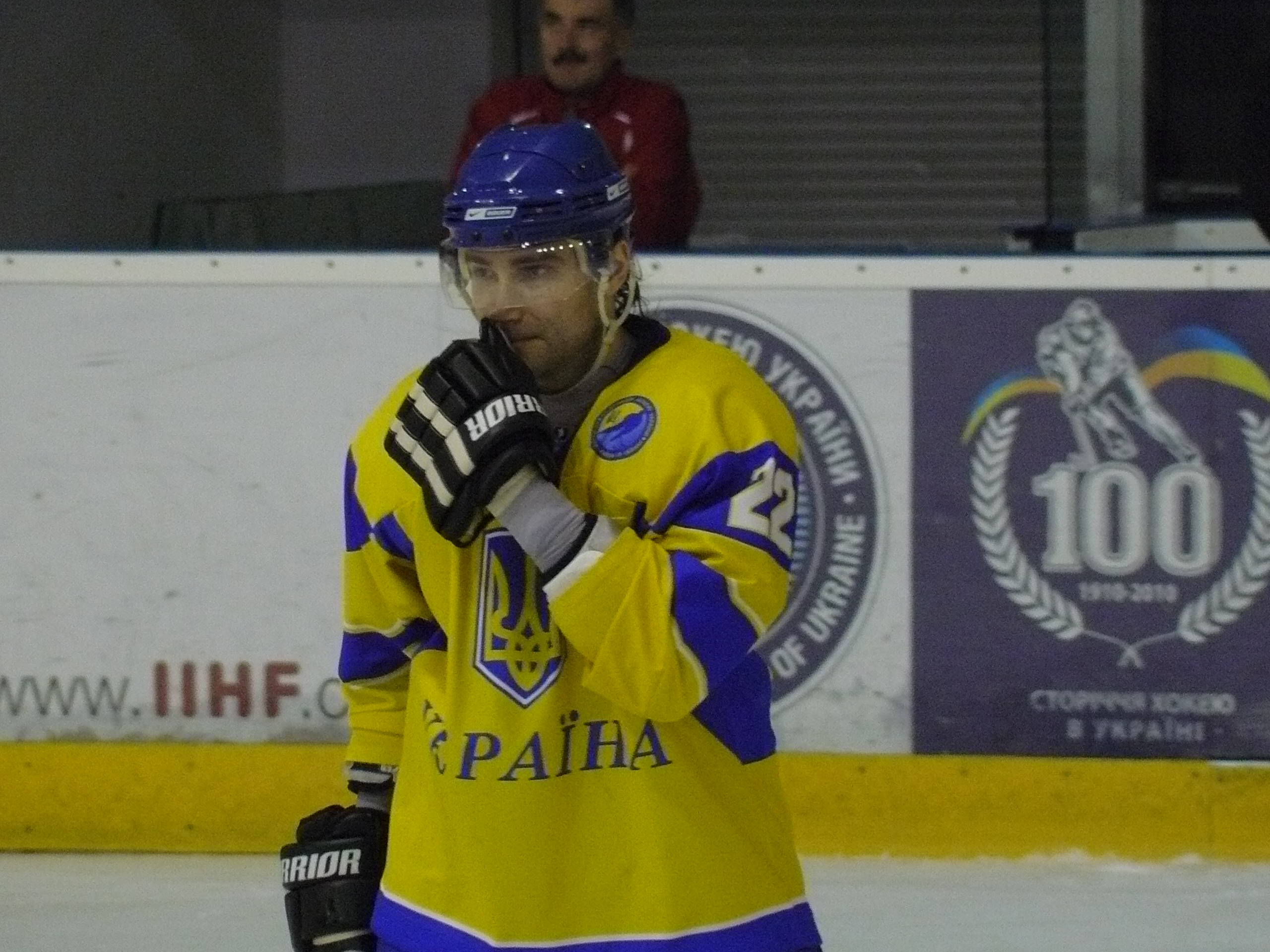
Dmytro Tsyrul

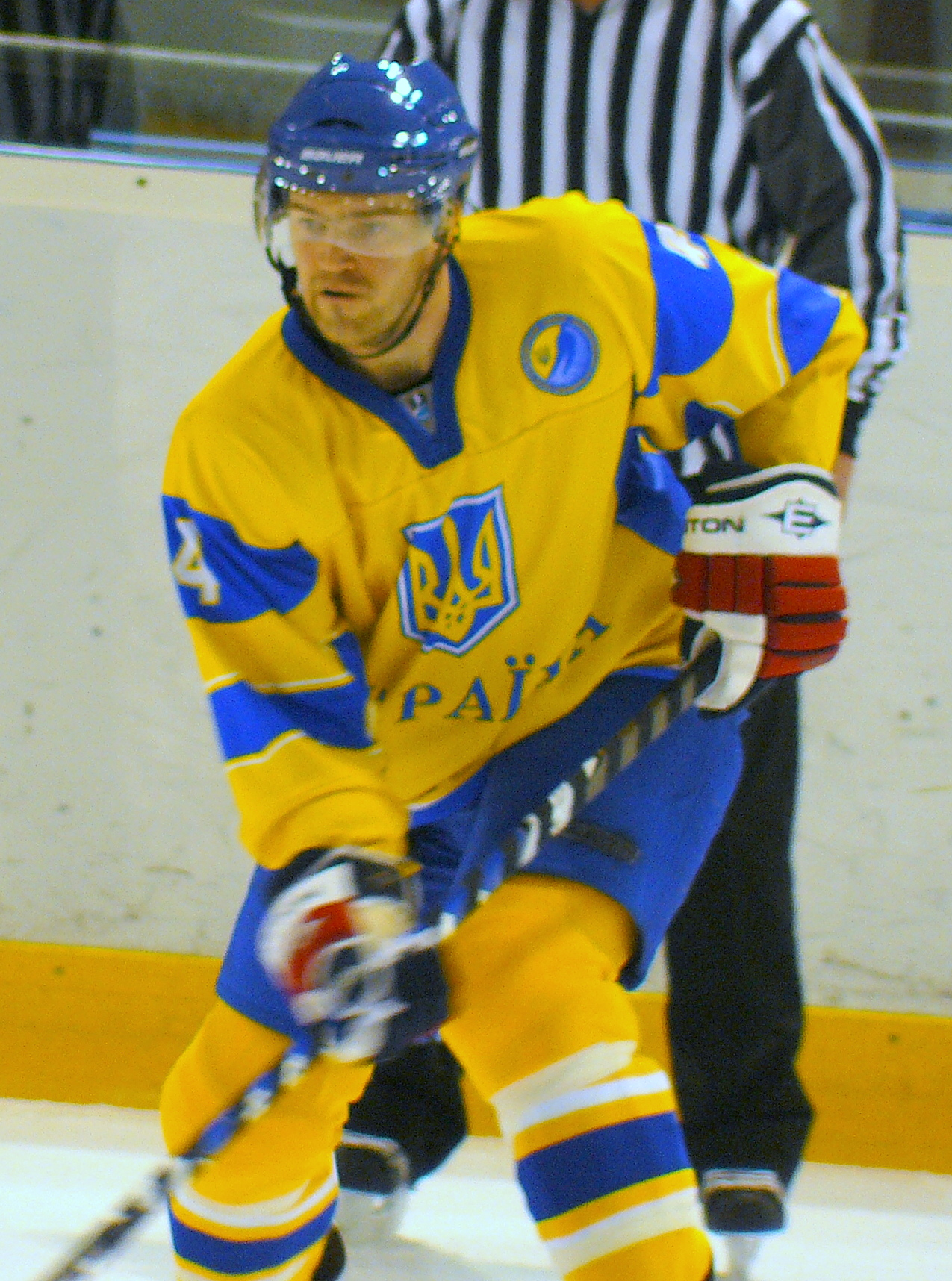
Dmytro Tolkunov

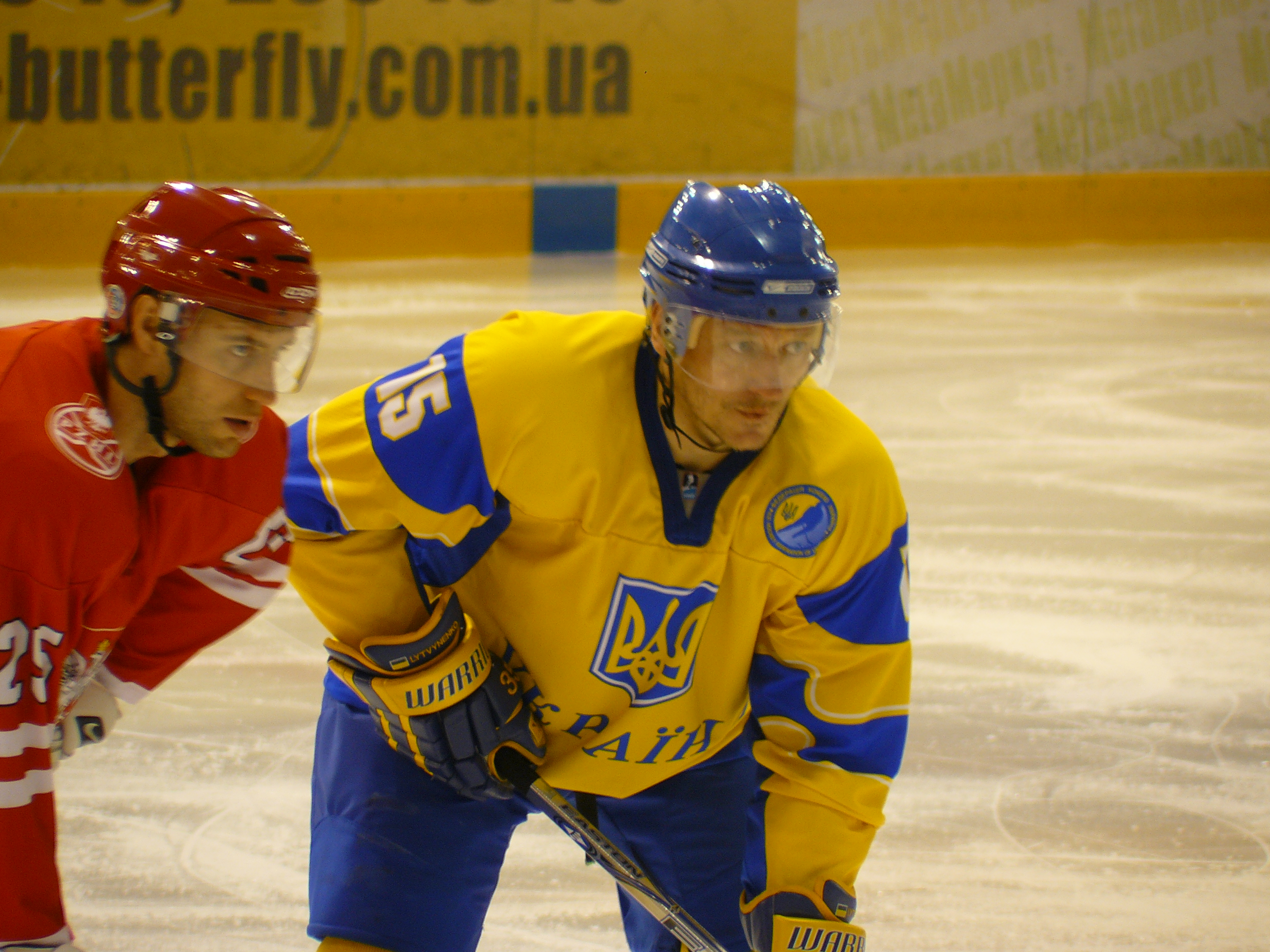
Vitaliy Lytvynenko

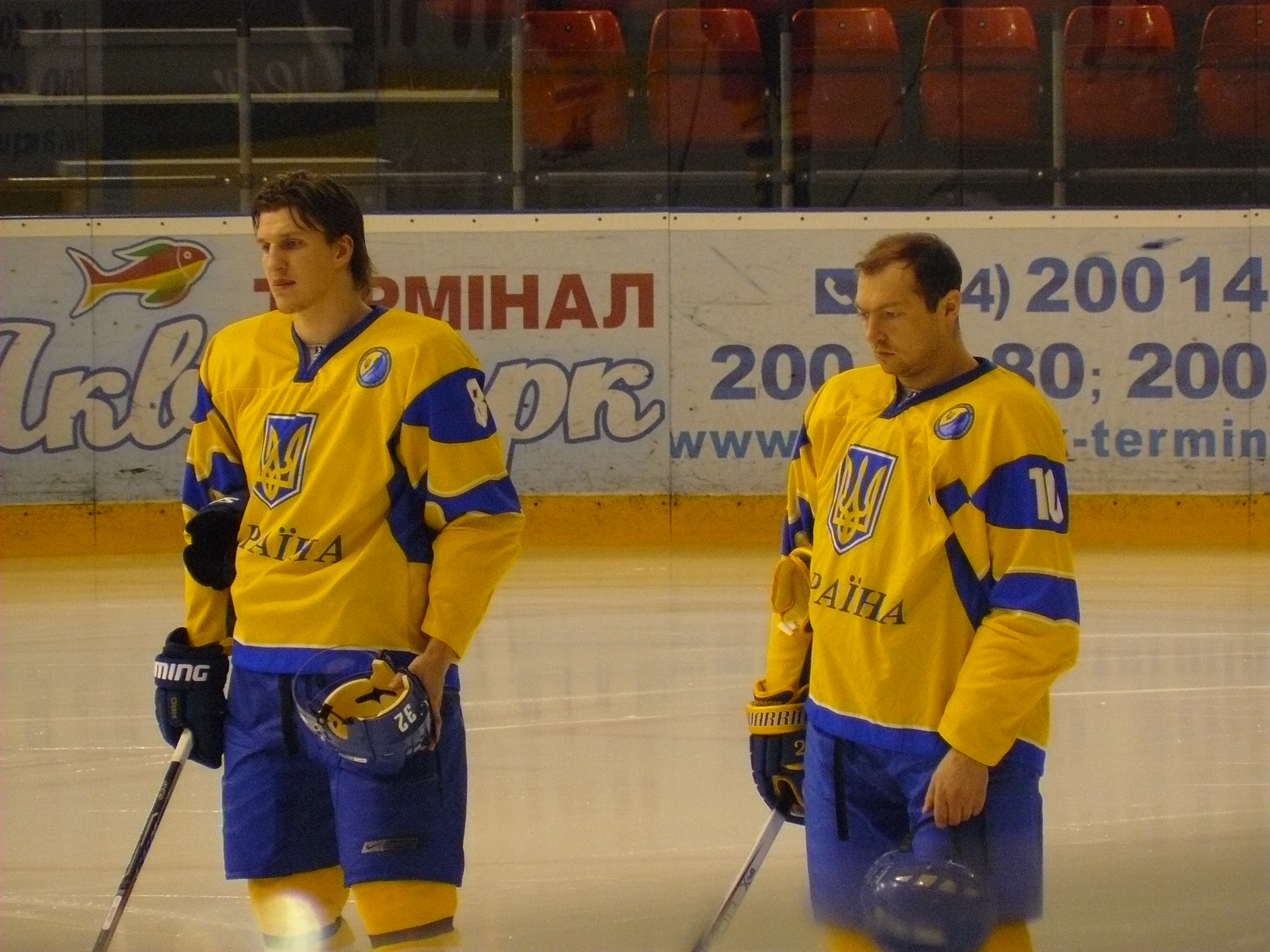
Andriy Mikhnov and Vadym Shakhraychuk

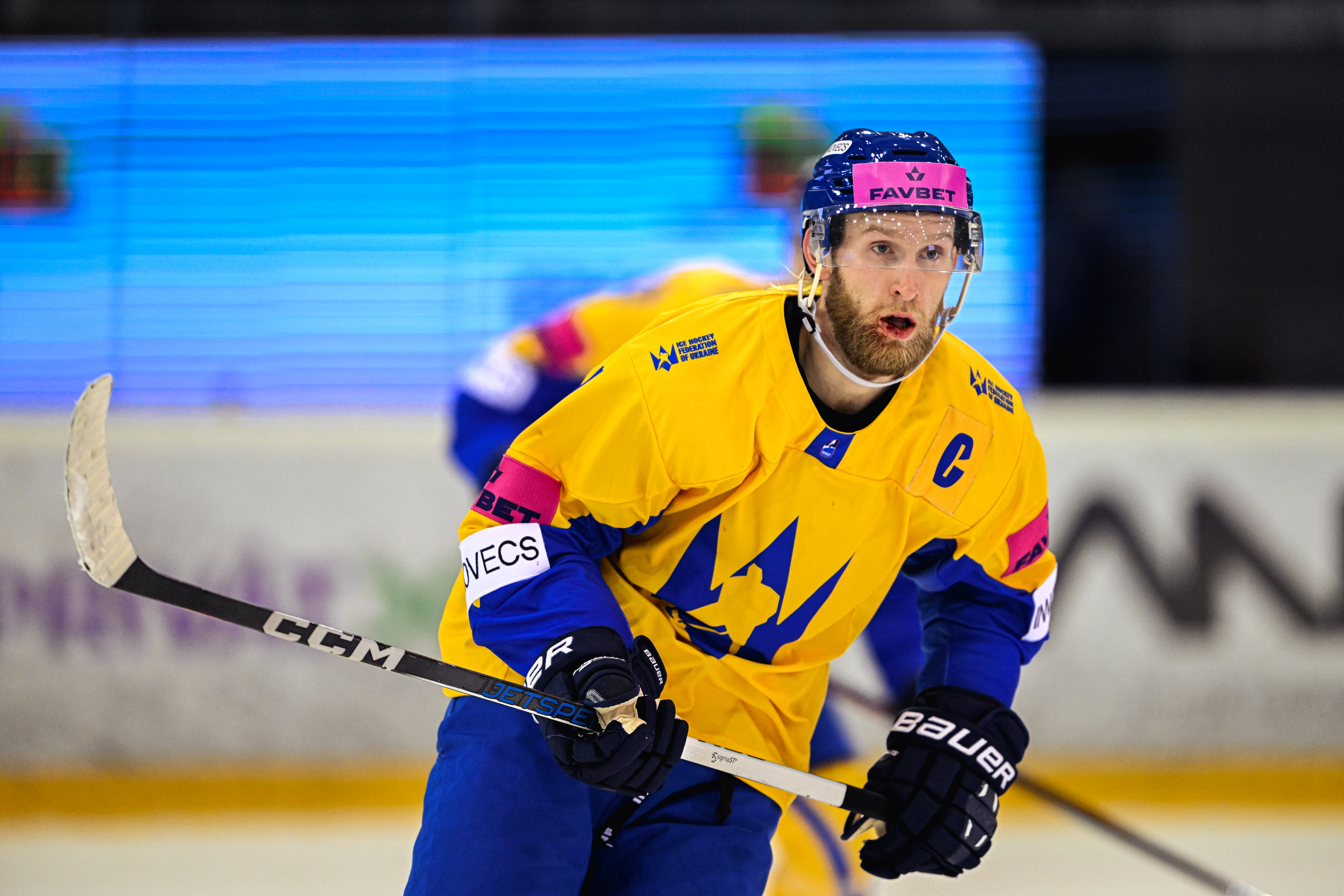
Igor Merezhko

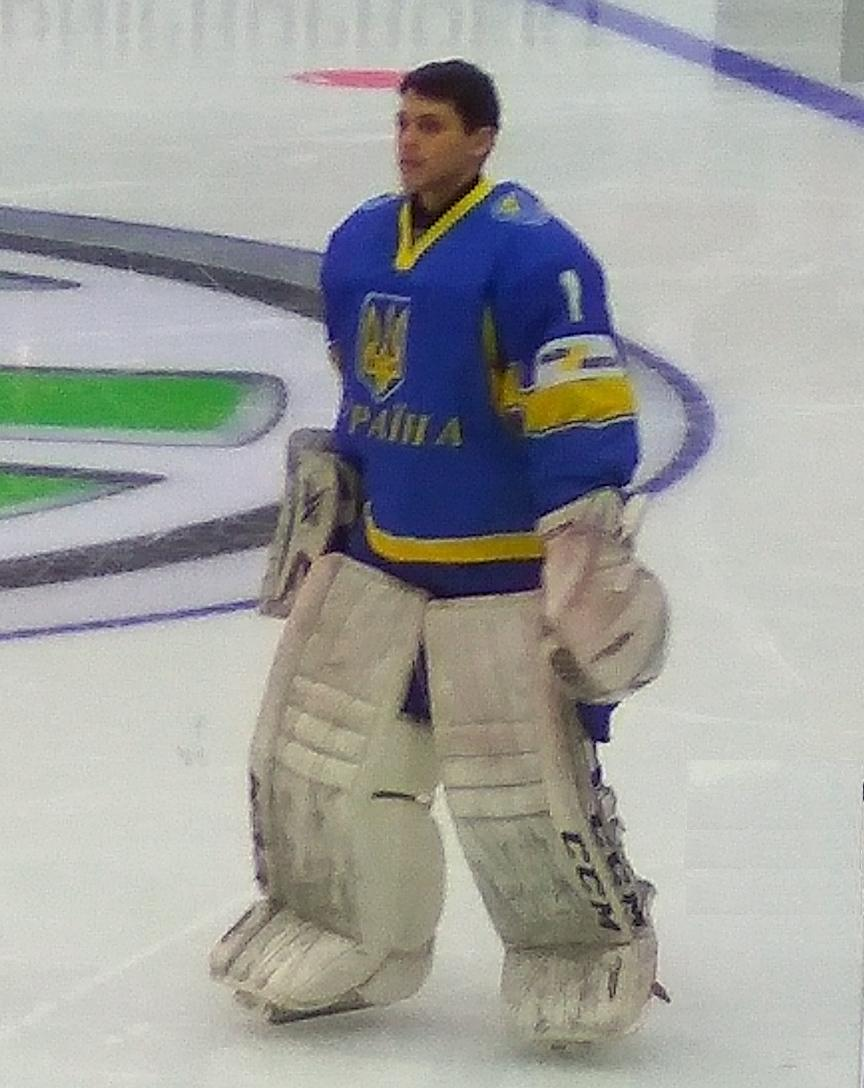
Bogdan Dyachenko
