= SAP Arena =

Multi-purpose arena in Mannheim, Baden-Württemberg, Germany

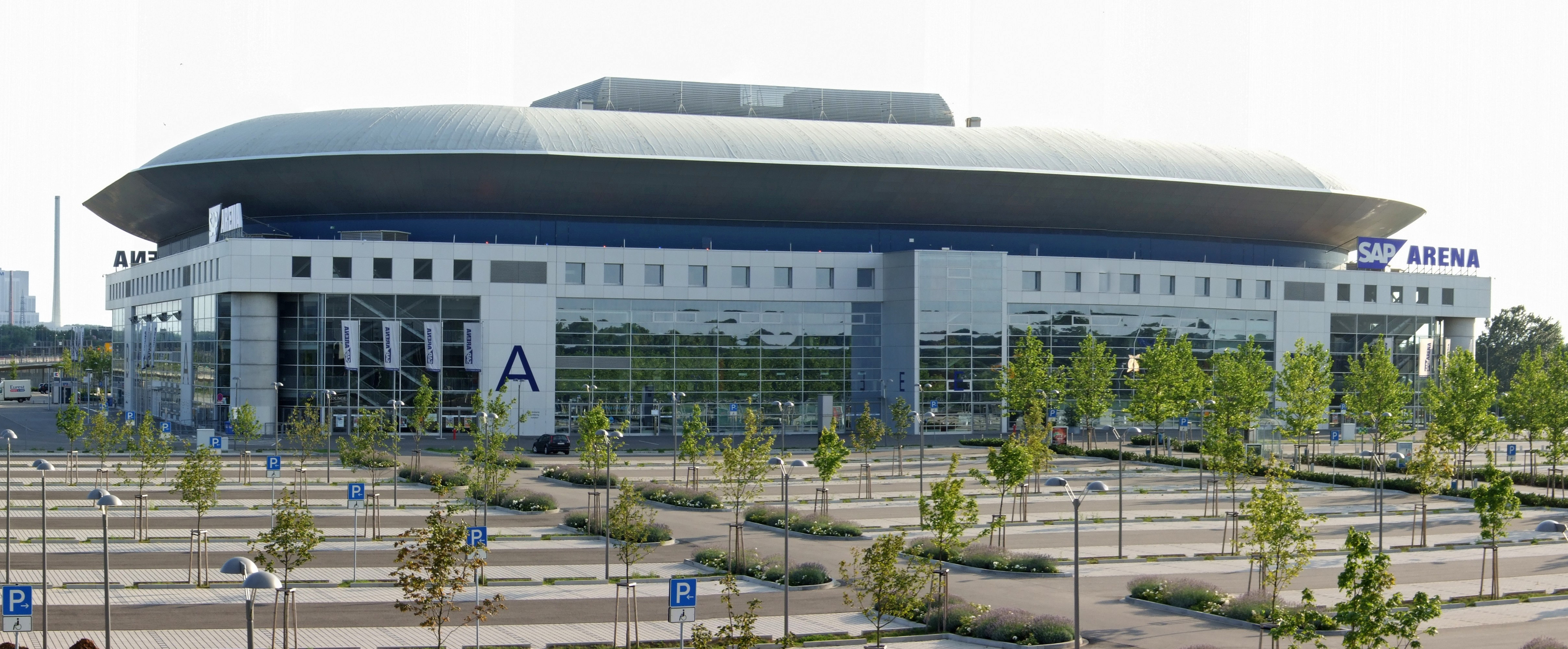
- Interactive map of SAP Arena
- Location: Mannheim, Germany
- Coordinates: 49°27′50.9″N 8°31′04.7″E
- Owner: Dietmar Hopp
- Capacity: 11,000–15,000 (concerts); 14,500 (handball); 13,900 (basketball); 13,600 (ice hockey)

Construction
- Groundbreaking: November 2002
- Opened: September 2, 2005
- Cost: € 70 million
- Architects: Hentrich – Petschnigg & Partner KG

Tenants
- Adler Mannheim (DEL) (2005–present); Rhein-Neckar Löwen (HBL) (2005–present)

SAP Arena is a multi-purpose arena in Mannheim, Germany. It is primarily used for ice hockey and handball, and is the home arena of the Adler Mannheim ice hockey club and the Rhein-Neckar Löwen handball club. Inaugurated in 2005, the arena has a capacity of up to 15,000 people. More than a hundred concerts and convention events are hosted at the arena annually. The SAP Arena is one of the largest in Germany and one of the most high-tech in Europe. The arena is named after its sponsor SAP.

In late December 2022, the MLP Academics Heidelberg played against FC Bayern Munich (basketball) there. The Academics drew their record crowd of 10,454 visitors. For each ticket sold, a donation was made to the Courage Foundation for the support of chronically ill children.

== Concerts ==
- On 19 and 20 February 2009, Tina Turner performed at the arena during her Tina!: 50th Anniversary Tour.
- Depeche Mode has performed at the arena four times: On 7 November 2009 during the Tour of the Universe, on 11 March 2006 during Touring the Angel, on 4 February 2014 during the Delta Machine Tour in front of a sold-out crowd of 11,280 people, and on 30 November 2017 during the Global Spirit Tour.
- On 16 November 2011, the English band Sade performed at the Arena.
- On 29 November 2015, Madonna played a show in front of a sold-out crowd of 10,883 people during her Rebel Heart Tour.
- On 11 February 2013, Deep Purple performed a show in front of nearly 10,000 people.
- On 13 July 2018, Justin Timberlake played a sold-out show in front of 10,476 people during his Man Of The Woods Tour.

== Boxing ==
Heavyweight boxer Wladimir Klitschko won or defended titles at the arena on four occasions from 2006 to 2013.

== Services ==
In January 2018 the SAP Arena became the first multi-purpose arena in Germany that provides location-based services like indoor navigation and proximity marketing to its visitors. Therefore, name sponsor SAP has had the arena equipped with 630 iBeacons by the German technology startup Favendo.

== Transport links ==
A tram line (number 6) connects the SAP Arena to Mannheim city center and a newly built road connection to the B38a motorway connects it to the A 656 Autobahn, leading to the A656/A 6 interchange, connecting eastbound Mannheim to Heidelberg (A656), and north-southbound to Frankfurt, Karlsruhe and Stuttgart (A6), as well as a little north on the A6 to Kaiserlautern (westbound).

== See also ==
- List of indoor arenas in Germany
- List of European ice hockey arenas
