= 2022 IIHF World Championship Division III =

International ice hockey tournament

Tournament details
- Host countries: Luxembourg; South Africa
- Venues: 2 (in 2 host cities)
- Dates: 3–8 April; 13–18 March
- Teams: 8

The 2022 IIHF World Championship Division III was an international ice hockey tournament run by the International Ice Hockey Federation.

The Group A tournament was held in Kockelscheuer, Luxembourg from 3 to 8 April and the Group B tournament in Cape Town, South Africa from 13 to 18 March 2022.

After the tournament was cancelled the two previous years due to the COVID-19 pandemic, all teams stayed put in their divisions.

The United Arab Emirates secured the top spot in Group A and were promoted to Division II, while South Africa won the Group B tournament and were promoted to Group A.

Russia and Belarus were suspended from the 2022 and 2023 editions of the World Championship. In order to fill each group of the World Championships back to their normal number of teams, the IIHF made the decision following the tournament not to relegate Luxembourg or Bosnia and Herzegovina, who finished last in Groups A and B respectively, but instead to promote Turkey and Thailand, the runners-up of each group.

== Group A tournament ==
2022 IIHF World Championship Division III A

Tournament details
- Host country: Luxembourg
- Venue: 1 (in 1 host city)
- Dates: 3–8 April
- Teams: 5

Tournament statistics
- Games played: 10
- Goals scored: 103 (10.3 per game)
- Attendance: 3,376 (338 per game)
- Scoring leader: (United Arab Emirates) Maksim Zakharau (22 points)

Official website
- Website

=== Participants ===
Team	Qualification
~~North Korea~~	Placed 6th in Division II B last edition and was relegated.
Turkey	Placed 2nd in Division III last edition.
Turkmenistan	Placed 3rd in Division III last edition.
Luxembourg	Host, placed 4th in Division III last edition.
Chinese Taipei	Placed 5th in Division III last edition.
United Arab Emirates	Placed 1st in Division III Q last edition and was promoted.

=== Match officials ===
Three referees and five linesmen were selected for the tournament.

Referees	Linesmen
(Israel) Ofer Rashal; (South Africa) Jonathan Burger; (Serbia) Đorđe Fazekas	(Belgium) Maarten Van den Acker; (Croatia) Tomislav Grozaj; (France) Vincent Zede; (Netherlands) Lodewijk Beelen; (Serbia) David Perduv

=== Standings ===
Pos	Team	Pld	W	OTW	OTL	L	GF	GA	GD	Pts	Promotion or relegation
1	United Arab Emirates (P)	4	4	0	0	0	41	11	+30	12	Promoted to the 2023 Division II B
2	Turkey (P)	4	3	0	0	1	23	22	+1	9	Promoted to the 2023 Division II B
3	Turkmenistan	4	1	0	1	2	17	23	−6	4	
4	Chinese Taipei	4	1	0	0	3	11	23	−12	3	
5	Luxembourg (H)	4	0	1	0	3	11	24	−13	2	
6	North Korea (Note: North Korea withdrew their team on 3 February 2022 because of the COVID-19 pandemic and the travel restrictions.)	0	0	0	0	0	0	0	0	0	Withdrawn

Source: IIHF
Rules for classification: 1) points; 2) head-to-head points; 3) head-to-head goal difference; 4) head-to-head number of goals scored; 5) result against closest best-ranked team outside tied teams; 6) result against second-best ranked team outside tied teams; 7) seeding before tournament.
(H) Host; (P) Promoted

=== Results ===
All times are local (UTC+2)

3 April 2022; 15:30	United Arab Emirates	10–4 (4–2, 4–1, 2–1)	Turkmenistan	Patinoire de Kockelscheuer, Kockelscheuer; Attendance: 100

Game reference

Ahmed Al-Dhaheri
Goalies
Keremli Charyyev
Rahman Myradov
Referee:
(South Africa) Jonathan Burger
Linesmen:
(Netherlands) Lodewijk Beelen
(Serbia) David Perduv

Usenko (Al-Mahrooqi, Shapavalau) – 00:44	1–0
	1–1	05:06 – Amanov (Avdeyev, Charyyev)
Chuikov (Zakharau) – 09:02	2–1
Zainutdinov (Usenko, Sauko) – 10:00	3–1
	3–2	19:10 – Esenov (Amanov)
Shapavalau (Chuikov) – 19:34	4–2
Zainutdinov (Al-Mahrooqi) – 21:08	5–2
Chuikov (Zakharau, J. Al-Dhaheri) (PP) – 24:37	6–2
Shapavalau (Zainutdinov) – 29:32	7–2
	7–3	29:52 – Annasaparov (Hydyrov)
J. Al-Dhaheri (Chuikov, Zakharau) – 38:53	8–3
Zainutdinov (Usenko, Remess) – 42:06	9–3
Zakharau (J. Al-Dhaheri, Al-Mazrouei) – 54:33	10–3
	10–4	56:28 – Esenov (Kakabayev)

8 min
Penalties
6 min
38
Shots
28

3 April 2022; 19:00	Turkey	7–2 (1–0, 3–1, 3–1)	Luxembourg	Patinoire de Kockelscheuer, Kockelscheuer; Attendance: 1,050

Game reference

Tolga Bozacı
Muhammed Karagül
Goalies
Philippe Lepage
Referee:
(Serbia) Đorđe Fazekas
Linesmen:
(Croatia) Tomislav Grozaj
(Belgium) Maarten Van den Acker

Bakal (Gümüş, Kabay) (PP) – 16:08	1–0
Solak (Y. Karş) – 22:38	2–0
	2–1	22:54 – M. Cannon (Potucek)
Ö. Karş (Solak) – 23:19	3–1
Bakal (Halil, Gümüş) (PP) – 32:12	4–1
Gümüş (Kabay) (PP) – 46:21	5–1
Gümüş (Bingöl, Ö. Karş) – 48:33	6–1
	6–2	54:52 – Church (Backes) (SH)
Ö. Karş (Y. Karş) (SH) – 57:54	7–2

19 min
Penalties
22 min
53
Shots
21

4 April 2022; 15:30	Chinese Taipei	2–10 (0–5, 0–4, 2–1)	United Arab Emirates	Patinoire de Kockelscheuer, Kockelscheuer; Attendance: 50

Game reference

He Wei-chih
Lee Yi-cheng
Goalies
Ahmed Al-Dhaheri
Referee:
(Israel) Ofer Rashal
Linesmen:
(Netherlands) Lodewijk Beelen
(France) Vincent Zede

	0–1	01:08 – M. Al-Dhaheri (J. Al-Dhaheri, Zakharau)
	0–2	02:40 – Usenko (Shapavalau, Sauko) (PP)
	0–3	05:31 – Chuikov (Zakharau)
	0–4	08:04 – Chuikov (Shapavalau, Zakharau)
	0–5	17:39 – J. Al-Dhaheri (Chuikov)
	0–6	24:58 – J. Al-Dhaheri (Zakharau)
	0–7	27:38 – Zakharau (Chuikov)
	0–8	36:10 – Zakharau (Chuikov, Sauko) (SH)
	0–9	39:47 – Usenko (Zainutdinov, Al-Mazrouei) (PP)
Wang (Shen Yen-c.) – 42:13	1–9
Mi (Chang, Lin J.) – 47:53	2–9
	2–10	50:26 – Chuikov

10 min
Penalties
12 min
26
Shots
55

5 April 2022; 15:30	Chinese Taipei	2–6 (0–1, 1–1, 1–4)	Turkey	Patinoire de Kockelscheuer, Kockelscheuer; Attendance: 75

Game reference

Lee Yi-cheng
Goalies
Tolga Bozacı
Referee:
(Serbia) Đorđe Fazekas
Linesmen:
(Croatia) Tomislav Grozaj
(Belgium) Maarten Van den Acker

	0–1	01:07 – Bakal
Chen K. (Pan) (PP) – 29:46	1–1
	1–2	37:31 – Gümüş (Kabay, Anlar) (PP)
Hsiao Po-yun (Hsiao Po-yuan) – 40:57	2–2
	2–3	43:25 – Bingöl (Gümüş)
	2–4	46:49 – Y. Karş (Ö. Karş, Bingöl)
	2–5	56:50 – Solak (Savaş) (EN)
	2–6	58:01 – Anlar (Turan, Y. Karş)

14 min
Penalties
10 min
24
Shots
34

5 April 2022; 19:00	Turkmenistan	4–5 OT (2–2, 1–2, 1–0) (OT: 0–1)	Luxembourg	Patinoire de Kockelscheuer, Kockelscheuer; Attendance: 580

Game reference

Rahman Myradov
Keremli Charyyev
Goalies
Philippe Lepage
Referee:
(Israel) Ofer Rashal
Linesmen:
(Serbia) David Perduv
(France) Vincent Zede

Dovletmyradov (Geldimyradov) – 04:01	1–0
	1–1	06:17 – M. Cannon (Church, C. Cannon)
Dovletmyradov (SH) – 09:03	2–1
	2–2	19:20 – Welter (Backes)
Barkovskiy (Dovletmyradov) (PP) – 25:25	3–2
	3–3	29:23 – Backes (Welter, Bechtold)
	3–4	37:17 – Church (C. Cannon, M. Cannon)
Dovletmyradov (SH) – 52:29	4–4
	4–5	61:57 – C. Cannon (Bechtold, M. Cannon) (PP)

6 min
Penalties
6 min
31
Shots
22

6 April 2022; 15:30	United Arab Emirates	13–4 (3–0, 5–2, 5–2)	Turkey	Patinoire de Kockelscheuer, Kockelscheuer; Attendance: 50

Game reference

Ahmed Al Dhaheri
Goalies
Tolga Bozaci
Muhammed Karagul
Referee:
(South Africa) Jonathan Burger
Linesmen:
(Serbia) David Perduv
(Belgium) Maarten Van den Acker

Usenko (Zainutdinov, Sauko) – 03:37	1–0
Zainutdinov (Zakharau) (SH) – 08:06	2–0
Chuikov (J. Al-Dhaheri, Zakharau) – 10:19	3–0
Zakharau – 20:57	4–0
Zakharau (Chuikov, Remess) – 21:54	5–0
	5–1	27:55 – Gümüş (Bakal, Halil) (PP)
	5–2	33:57 – Halil (Gümüş, Solak) (PP)
Usenko (Remess, Shapavalau) (PP) – 36:08	6–2
J. Al-Dhaheri (Remess, Zakharau) (PP) – 36:31	7–2
Chuikov (Zakharau, J. Al-Dhaheri) (PP) – 38:59	8–2
	8–3	43:51 – Ö. Karş (Gümüş, Bingol)
Chuikov (Remess) (SH) – 45:36	9–3
J. Al-Dhaheri (Zakharau, Chuikov) – 47:58	10–3
Al-Haddad (Chuikov, Al-Yafeai) – 55:30	11–3
	11–4	56:52 – Gümüş (Ö. Karş)
Al-Humaidi – 57:37	12–4
Chuikov – 59:24	13–4

70 min
Penalties
37 min
31
Shots
22

7 April 2022; 15:30	Turkmenistan	4–2 (0–2, 3–0, 1–0)	Chinese Taipei	Patinoire de Kockelscheuer, Kockelscheuer; Attendance: 79

Game reference

Rahman Myradov
Goalies
Lee Yi-cheng
Referee:
(Serbia) Đorđe Fazekas
Linesmen:
(Netherlands) Lodewijk Beelen
(Serbia) David Perduv

	0–1	16:46 – Hsiao Po-yuan (Pan, Chen K.) (PP)
	0–2	16:58 – Lu (Chen K., Chen W.)
Dovletmyradov – 24:45	1–2
Amanov – 31:39	2–2
Barkovskiy – 32:46	3–2
Vahovskiy (Amanov) – 47:52	4–2

10 min
Penalties
8 min
26
Shots
21

7 April 2022; 19:00	Luxembourg	1–8 (1–2, 0–5, 0–1)	United Arab Emirates	Patinoire de Kockelscheuer, Kockelscheuer; Attendance: 558

Game reference

Philippe Lepage
Sven Cruchten
Goalies
Khaled Al-Suwaidi
Referee:
(Israel) Ofer Rashal
Linesmen:
(Croatia) Tomislav Grozaj
(France) Vincent Zede

	0–1	03:23 – Al-Yafeai (Zakharau)
	0–2	08:30 – Chuikov (Usenko, Al-Haddad)
Biver (Grönlund) (Mossong) – 10:59	1–2
	1–3	21:30 – Zakharau (Remess) (J. Al-Dhaheri)
	1–4	23:51 – Zainutdinov (Zakharau)
	1–5	35:48 – Zainutdinov
	1–6	36:15 – J. Al-Dhaheri (Zakharau, Remess)
	1–7	38:05 – Zakharau (Al-Yafeai, Zainutdinov)
	1–8	40:25 – Al-Yafeai (Zainutdinov, Chuikov)

10 min
Penalties
4 min
13
Shots
48

8 April 2022; 15:30	Turkey	6–5 (1–0, 4–2, 1–3)	Turkmenistan	Patinoire de Kockelscheuer, Kockelscheuer; Attendance: 134

Game reference

Tolga Bozaci
Goalies
Rahman Myradov
Referee:
(Serbia) Đorđe Fazekas
Linesmen:
(Croatia) Tomislav Grozaj
(France) Vincent Zede

Gümüş (Ö. Karş, Uzunali) – 03:06	1–0
	1–1	27:13 – Baymyradov (Esenov)
Bakal (Ö. Karş, Bingöl) (PP) – 28:37	2–1
Bingöl (Ö. Karş, Sentürk) – 33:37	3–1
Bingöl (Gümüş, Y. Karş) (PP2) – 36:40	4–1
	4–2	39:02 – Hydyrov (Vahovskiy) (PP)
Gümüş (Bingöl, Ö. Karş) – 39:23	5–2
	5–3	42:54 – Barkovskiy (Gayer)
Kavaz (Anlar) – 43:15	6–3
	6–4	43:53 – Kakabayev
	6–5	54:29 – Hydyrov (Vahovskiy) (PP)

12 min
Penalties
17 min
29
Shots
20

8 April 2022; 19:00	Luxembourg	3–5 (1–1, 0–2, 2–2)	Chinese Taipei	Patinoire de Kockelscheuer, Kockelscheuer; Attendance: 700

Game reference

Philippe Lepage
Goalies
He Wei-chih
Referee:
(South Africa) Jonathan Burger
Linesmen:
(Netherlands) Lodewijk Beelen
(Belgium) Maarten Van den Acker

Mossong (Potucek) – 06:21	1–0
	1–1	11:15 – Yu (Pan, Shen Yen-c.) (PP)
	1–2	33:17 – Chuang (Shen Yen-c., Lu) (PP)
	1–3	37:34 – Chang (Lu, Chen K.)
	1–4	43:24 – Hsiao Po-yuan (Shen Y, Shen Yen-l.) (PP)
Welter (Backes, Mossong) – 53:03	2–4
Backes (Grönlund, C. Cannon) (EA) – 59:54	3–4
	3–5	59:59 – Shen Yen-l. (Hsiao Po-yun) (EN)

8 min
Penalties
4 min
28
Shots
43

=== Statistics ===
==== Scoring leaders ====
List shows the top skaters sorted by points, then goals.

Player	GP	G	A	Pts	+/−	PIM	POS
(United Arab Emirates) Maksim Zakharau	4	7	15	22	+19	2	F
(United Arab Emirates) Ilia Chuikov	4	10	9	19	+14	4	F
(Turkey) Serkan Gümüş	4	7	6	13	+1	4	F
(United Arab Emirates) Juma Al-Dhaheri	4	6	6	12	+16	2	F
(United Arab Emirates) Artur Zainutdinov	4	6	5	11	+12	2	F
(Turkey) Ömer Karş	4	3	7	10	+3	6	F
(United Arab Emirates) Alexander Usenko	4	5	3	7	+7	4	F
(Turkey) Sait Bingol	4	3	5	8	+1	0	F
(United Arab Emirates) Nils Remess	4	0	7	7	+13	0	D
(United Arab Emirates) Dzmitry Shapavalau	4	2	4	6	+10	10	D

GP = Games played; G = Goals; A = Assists; Pts = Points; +/− = Plus/Minus; PIM = Penalties in Minutes; POS = Position
Source: IIHF.com

==== Goaltending leaders ====
Only the top five goaltenders, based on save percentage, who have played at least 40% of their team's minutes, are included in this list.

Player	TOI	GA	GAA	SA	Sv%	SO
(United Arab Emirates) Ahmed Al-Dhaheri	180:00	10	3.33	76	86.84	0
(Luxembourg) Philippe Lepage	220:12	22	5.99	166	86.75	0
(Chinese Taipei) Li Yi-cheng	152:07	12	4.73	90	86.67	0
(Turkmenistan) Rahman Myradov	199:33	14	4.21	92	84.78	0
(Turkey) Tolga Bozacı	233:24	21	5.40	95	77.89	0

TOI = time on ice (minutes:seconds); SA = shots against; GA = goals against; GAA = goals against average; Sv% = save percentage; SO = shutouts
Source: IIHF.com

=== Awards ===
Position	Player
Goaltender	(Luxembourg) Philippe Lepage
Defenceman	(United Arab Emirates) Dzmitry Shapavalau
Forward	(Turkey) Serkan Gümüş

== Group B tournament ==
2022 IIHF World Championship Division III B

Tournament details
- Host country: South Africa
- Venue: 1 (in 1 host city)
- Dates: 13–18 March
- Teams: 3

Tournament statistics
- Games played: 6
- Goals scored: 56 (9.33 per game)
- Attendance: 1,455 (243 per game)
- Scoring leader: (Thailand) Jan Isaksson (12 points)

Official website
- Website

=== Participants ===
Team	Qualification
South Africa	Host, placed 6th in Division III last edition and was relegated.
~~Hong Kong~~	Placed 2nd in Division III Q last edition.
Thailand	Placed 3rd in Division III Q last edition.
Bosnia and Herzegovina	Placed 4th in Division III Q last edition.

=== Match officials ===
Two referees and three linesmen were selected for the tournament.

Referees	Linesmen
(Netherlands) Stef Oosterling; (Slovakia) Martin Jobbágy	(Bulgaria) Martin Boyadijev; (South Africa) Morne Moses; (United Arab Emirates) Ahmed Al-Farsi

=== Standings ===
Pos	Team	Pld	W	OTW	OTL	L	GF	GA	GD	Pts	Promotion or relegation
1	South Africa (H, P)	4	3	0	1	0	24	13	+11	10	Promoted to the 2023 Division III A
2	Thailand (P)	4	2	1	0	1	20	17	+3	8	Promoted to the 2023 Division III A
3	Bosnia and Herzegovina	4	0	0	0	4	12	26	−14	0	
4	Hong Kong (Note: Hong Kong withdrew their team on 14 February 2022 because of the COVID-19 pandemic.)	0	0	0	0	0	0	0	0	0	Withdrawn

Source: IIHF
Rules for classification: 1) points; 2) head-to-head points; 3) head-to-head goal difference; 4) head-to-head number of goals scored; 5) result against closest best-ranked team outside tied teams; 6) result against second-best ranked team outside tied teams; 7) seeding before tournament.
(H) Host; (P) Promoted

=== Results ===
All times are local (UTC+2)

13 March 2022; 19:00	South Africa	8–3 (2–0, 2–3, 4–0)	Bosnia and Herzegovina	The Ice Station, Cape Town; Attendance: 250

Game reference

Ryan Boyd
Goalies
Dino Pašović
Referee:
(Slovakia) Martin Jobbágy
Linesmen:
(United Arab Emirates) Ahmed Al-Farsi
(Bulgaria) Martin Boyadijev

Compton – 06:39	1–0
Samaai (SH) – 11:08	2–0
	2–1	24:54 – Omer
Valadas (Krotz) – 26:48	3–1
	3–2	29:17 – Gaković (Miskić)
	3–3	36:48 – H. Mrkva (Omer, Mlivić) (PP)
Valadas (Krotz) – 39:39	4–3
Compton (Venter) – 41:47	5–3
Venter (Phakathi, Compton) – 43:39	6–3
Samaai (Carelse, Verwey) – 51:41	7–3
Birrell (Samaai) – 57:59	8–3

10 min
Penalties
4 min
30
Shots
19

14 March 2022; 19:00	Bosnia and Herzegovina	4–8 (0–2, 2–2, 2–4)	Thailand	The Ice Station, Cape Town; Attendance: 60

Game reference

Dino Pašović
Goalies
Benjamin Kleinechay
Referee:
(Netherlands) Stef Oosterling
Linesmen:
(Bulgaria) Martin Boyadijev
(South Africa) Morne Moses

	0–1	07:52 – Isaksson (Forstner)
	0–2	15:45 – Suwachirat (Kindborn)
	0–3	29:34 – Kitayama (Forstner, Nagayama)
Gaković (T. Mrkva) – 34:41	1–3
	1–4	35:26 – Kitayama (Kindborn)
Mrkva (Ćatović, Gaković) – 36:14	2–4
	2–5	40:48 – Kitayama (Isaksson)
Alić (Čordalija) (PP) – 42:19	3–5
	3–6	45:46 – Forstner (Isaksson) (PP)
	3–7	47:57 – Kitayama
Omer (London) – 50:27	4–7
	4–8	54:53 – Suwachirat (Nagayama)

4 min
Penalties
10 min
33
Shots
40

15 March 2022; 19:00	South Africa	5–2 (0–0, 2–2, 3–0)	Thailand	The Ice Station, Cape Town; Attendance: 280

Game reference

Ryan Boyd
Goalies
Benjamin Kleinechay
Referee:
(Netherlands) Stef Oosterling
Linesmen:
(United Arab Emirates) Ahmed Al-Farsi
(Bulgaria) Martin Boyadijev

	0–1	21:32 – Luckanatinakorn (Isaksson, Kindborn)
	0–2	26:06 – Isaksson
Vivier (Birrell, Venter) – 28:12	1–2
Giot (Samaai) – 39:51	2–2
Phakathi (Venter, Krotz) – 44:01	3–2
Carelse (Giot) – 52:08	4–2
Venter – 55:57	5–2

4 min
Penalties
32 min
46
Shots
23

16 March 2022; 19:00	Bosnia and Herzegovina	2–6 (1–6, 1–0, 0–0)	South Africa	The Ice Station, Cape Town; Attendance: 265

Game reference

Dino Pašović
Goalies
Ryan Boyd
Referee:
(Slovakia) Martin Jobbágy
Linesmen:
(United Arab Emirates) Ahmed Al-Farsi
(South Africa) Morne Moses

	0–1	03:19 – Samaai (Venter)
H. Mrkva (Miskić) – 06:22	1–1
	1–2	09:02 – Birrell (Samaai, Magmoed) (PP2)
	1–3	09:22 – Krotz (PP)
	1–4	09:37 – Van Doesburgh (Birrell)
	1–5	13:33 – Compton (Kluyts)
	1–6	17:50 – Giot (Birrell)
H. Mrkva (Ćatović, Gaković) – 21:41	2–6

16 min
Penalties
18 min
20
Shots
51

17 March 2022; 19:00	Thailand	4–3 (1–1, 1–1, 2–1)	Bosnia and Herzegovina	The Ice Station, Cape Town; Attendance: 100

Game reference

Benjamin Kleinechay
Goalies
Dino Pašović
Referee:
(Netherlands) Stef Oosterling
Linesmen:
(Bulgaria) Martin Boyadijev
(South Africa) Morne Moses

	0–1	03:24 – Omer (Hasović, H. Mrkva) (PP)
Kitayama (Nagayama, Isaksson) – 15:20	1–1
Isaksson (Forstner) – 36:50	2–1
	2–2	38:44 – Gaković (Omer)
Suwachirat (Isaksson) – 40:33	3–2
Isaksson (Suwachirat) – 45:44	4–2
	4–3	56:08 – Omer (Pilav)

10 min
Penalties
8 min
52
Shots
43

18 March 2022; 17:00	Thailand	6–5 GWS (3–0, 2–2, 0–3) (OT: 0–0) (SO: 1–0)	South Africa	The Ice Station, Cape Town; Attendance: 500

Game reference

Benjamin Kleinechay
Goalies
Ryan Boyd
Referee:
(Slovakia) Martin Jobbágy
Linesmen:
(United Arab Emirates) Ahmed Al-Farsi
(Bulgaria) Martin Boyadijev

Phatigulsate (Thanakroekkiat) – 03:06	1–0
Suwachirat (Isaksson, Harnchaipibulgul) – 10:54	2–0
Phatigulsate – 11:11	3–0
Suwachirat (Isaksson, Forstner) – 24:35	4–0
	4–1	35:06 – Venter (Samaai)
Isaksson (Kindborn) (PP) – 35:59	5–1
	5–2	39:26 – Carelse (Samaai)
	5–3	40:32 – Samaai (SH)
	5–4	42:07 – Kluyts
	5–5	53:49 – Van Doesburgh (Venter) (EN)

Isaksson (miss)
Nagayama (miss)
Kitayama
Phatigulsate
Shootout
(miss) Compton
(miss) Magmoed
(miss) Valdas
Venter
(miss) Samaai
6 min
Penalties
10 min
33
Shots
42

=== Statistics ===
==== Scoring leaders ====
List shows the top skaters sorted by points, then goals.

Player	GP	G	A	Pts	+/−	PIM	POS
(Thailand) Jan Isaksson	4	5	7	12	+8	4	F
(South Africa) Uthman Samaai	4	4	5	9	+9	2	F
(Thailand) Phanuruj Suwachirat	4	5	1	6	+4	2	F
(Bosnia and Herzegovina) Mirza Omer	4	4	2	6	−5	6	F
(Thailand) Masato Kitayama	4	5	0	5	−3	0	F
(Bosnia and Herzegovina) Nikko Gaković	4	3	2	5	−4	0	F
(South Africa) Cameron Birrell	4	2	3	5	+7	6	D
(South Africa) John Venter	4	2	3	5	+3	2	F
(Thailand) Patrick Forstner	4	1	4	5	+4	8	F
(South Africa) Dylan Compton	4	3	1	4	+4	8	F

GP = Games played; G = Goals; A = Assists; Pts = Points; +/− = Plus/Minus; PIM = Penalties in Minutes; POS = Position
Source: IIHF.com

==== Goaltending leaders ====
Only the top five goaltenders, based on save percentage, who have played at least 40% of their team's minutes, are included in this list.

Player	TOI	GA	GAA	SA	Sv%	SO
(Thailand) Benjamin Kleinechay	245:00	17	4.16	164	89.63	0
(South Africa) Ryan Boyd	245:00	12	2.94	94	87.23	0
(Bosnia and Herzegovina) Dino Pašović	239:25	26	6.52	173	84.97	0

TOI = time on ice (minutes:seconds); SA = shots against; GA = goals against; GAA = goals against average; Sv% = save percentage; SO = shutouts
Source: IIHF.com

=== Awards ===
Position	Player
Goaltender	(Thailand) Benjamin Kleinechay
Defenceman	(South Africa) Cameron Birrell
Forward	(South Africa) Uthman Samaai
