= Bangor F.C. =

Association football club in Northern Ireland

Bangor
- Full name: Bangor Football Club
- Nickname: The Seasiders
- Founded: 1918
- Ground: Clandeboye Park, Bangor, County Down, Northern Ireland
- Capacity: 1,900 (500 seated)
- Chairman: Graham Bailie
- Manager: Lee Feeney
- League: NIFL Premiership
- 2025–26: NIFL Premiership, 10th of 12
Home colours	Away colours

Bangor Football Club is a semi-professional Northern Irish football club playing in the NIFL Premiership. The club, founded in 1918, hails from Bangor and plays its home matches at Clandeboye Park. Club colours are gold and royal blue.

== History ==
=== Early history ===
The first Bangor FC was founded, according to local legend, in 1914 in a rowing boat on Bangor Bay. When The Great War was declared in the August of that year, football was abandoned in Bangor as many young men rushed to join up and the then leading junior teams in the town, Bangor Rangers and Clifton Amateurs, folded. Soon, however, two enthusiasts, Bob Lindsay and Jimmy Savage, found they could not face the prospect of a winter without football and so the idea of a "Bangor FC" was born as they discussed the situation when out for a row in the bay.

Back on dry land, a committee was formed and the new Bangor FC played at the Recreation Ground off the Brunswick Road, as a successful member of the Irish Football Alliance. However, in August 1918, Bangor FC wound up its affairs as there was a feeling amongst some members that it was wrong to be playing sport while young men were being slaughtered in the carnage of Flanders. Others were convinced that life should continue as normally as possible and within a matter of days a "new" Bangor FC was born, taking over the fixtures and many of the players of the "old" Bangor FC.

Encouraged by early success, Bangor joined the then Intermediate league where they played until gaining admission into the Irish League in 1927. Their first senior match was a local derby against Ards at Castlereagh Park on 20 August 1927.

The late twenties and thirties were times of economic depression, money was scarce, gates disappointing and the club had to be run on a shoe-string. Against this background, Bangor were able to field a team which was able to keep its head above water, though often to be found in the lower half of the league.

At that time Bangor FC played at the Ballyholme Showgrounds where they had moved from their second home in Castle Street in 1923. The Showgrounds were situated just behind the Ballyholme Esplanade and, being sand based, had one of the best and robust surfaces in the Irish League. In 1934, the club was given notice to quit as the ground was required for building houses; Sandringham Drive now occupies the site.

After a season when all games had to be played away from home and which almost saw the demise of the club, Bangor moved in 1935 to their present home at Clandeboye Park, which was provided by Bangor Borough Council.

=== Recent history ===
Bangor enjoyed the most successful period in its history during the 1990s when the club qualified for Europe for the first time in its history after finishing second in the Irish League. This success was followed by winning the Irish Cup in 1993 after two replays against bitter rivals, Ards. Paul Byrne, who scored the winning goal with the last kick of the game, moved on to Celtic.

In October 2007, the club announced that a deal had been struck with property developers to sell land at the rear of the ground and use this to clear all debts. On 13 May 2008, it was announced that Bangor had secured a place in the new 12-team IFA Premiership for the 2008/09, season despite only having finished third in the IFA Intermediate League First Division in 2007/08.

Their stay in the Premiership only lasted a season as midway through the campaign the Club decided not to re-apply for the Domestic Licence that was required to compete at this level. On 1 February 2009, the club announced that it would not be renewing its domestic licence for 2009–10 and would therefore resign from the IFA Premiership at the end of the season due to financial reasons and low attendances at matches. Connected with this announcement, manager Marty Quinn resigned and was appointed as manager of Glenavon. As a result, Bangor FC were relegated at the end of the season and in season 2009/10 they competed in the Championship 1 league. The first season back in Intermediate football proved quite difficult with a hastily arranged, young squad. A draw in the penultimate match of the season against Ballymoney United ensured that they avoided the ignominy of relegation to Championship 2 by a single point.

Marty Quinn was replaced by Colin McCurdy who guided Bangor through their first season back in Intermediate Football. Colin McCurdy resigned from his position on 18 September 2010 and former player Frankie Wilson was appointed.

A trio of Bangor players were selected for the Northern Ireland Junior International Squad for a Regions Cup qualifying mini-tournament in Macedonia. Defender Brian Hylands, striker Barry Bloomer and goalkeeper Graeme McKibbin played an active part in Harry McConkey's Regions Cup squad.

Frankie Wilson was announced as Colin McCurdy's replacement on 30 September 2010. A talented midfielder, Frankie began his Irish League playing career at Ballyclare Comrades in November 1991. He later had spells at Carrick Rangers and Omagh Town before joining Bangor in December 2001. Frankie made 35 starting appearances and scored seven goals for Bangor before returning to Omagh Town in the summer of 2003.

In his first full season in charge, Frankie Wilson guided the side to its first trophy since 2005 when they won the Steel & Sons Cup. This was secured on Christmas Eve, 24 December 2011 when they defeated Larne 2–1 in front of a large crowd at Seaview in Belfast. Gareth McLaughlin and Man of the Match, Garth Scates were the scorers.

After a poor run of results which saw Bangor plunge to the bottom of Championship 1 at the end of 2012, Frankie Wilson stood down as manager and was replaced by Garth Scates. During the 2014–15 season Garth Scates stepped down as manager due to not holding the appropriate coaching badges for the club to obtain a Championship Licence, Jeff Montgomery took over as manager and Garth Scates remains as 1st Team Coach. Spike Hill was named as first team coach in October 2016 after Garth Scates and Jeff Montgomery resigned during a league game away to Limavady United. Kyle Spiers joined Spike Hill as Director of Football at the club at the same time as Spike's arrival.

The club were involved in a pulsating promotion race in the 2014–2015 season with Carrick Rangers and Ards with Carrick eventually scooping the title and promotion to the NIFL Premiership with the Seasiders entering a play off with Premiership Warrenpoint Town to whom they lost on penalties in the second leg to keep The Point in the premiership for another season.

=== Dropping out of NIFL and financial difficulty 2016-19 ===
In February 2016, the club, suffering a degree of financial difficulty was issued a winding up order from their contractors who installed their 3G Pitch which was successfully settled. The club would be demoted to the NIFL Premier Intermediate League after failing to apply for a NIFL Championship licence in the appropriate time, dropping to the third tier of Northern Irish football for the first time in their history.

The Seasiders would suffer back to back relegations when they were relegated to the Ballymena & Provincial Intermediate League at the end of the 16/17 Season after finishing bottom of the NIFL Premier Intermediate League, being relegated from senior football for the first time, with the Seasiders sharp decline in the space of only a few years causing great surprise in Irish League football.

Linfield captain and Bangor native Jamie Mulgrew would lament the situation at the club, describing them as a "Laughing Stock", in light of off the field issues, and their decline from reaching the County Antrim Shield final and being denied promotion to the NIFL Premiership on penalties two years previous to dropping out of senior football for the first time ever.

Following the club's relegation from League football, both Hill and Spiers tendered their resignations and former Albert Foundry manager Hugh Sinclair was appointed.

Bangor won the BPIL league, winning 27 of 28 league games (1 draw) in the 18/19 Season, to comfortably win the league title and secure promotion back to league football for the 19/20 season.

=== Championship return 2023- ===
In April 2023, following a win over Queens University, the club secured promotion to the NIFL Championship for the first time since 2016. In their first season back in the Championship, they finished third and narrowly missing out on a play-off place for promotion.

In the 2024–25 NIFL Championship Season, the club won the league title and secured promotion to the NIFL Premiership, the club will play in the top flight of Northern Irish football for the first time since the 2008-2009 IFA Premiership.

== Colours ==
The official club colours are gold and blue, although in recent years the gold has been replaced by yellow as this is the shade more commonly used by kit manufacturers. The original colours were blue shirts and white shorts but the club changed these to gold and blue before the Second World War as a mark of thanks to Bangor Borough Council who donated them the land on the Clandeboye Road where Clandeboye Park now stands.

Gold and blue are traditional Bangor colours with the gold representing sand and the blue representing the sea.

For the 2008/09 Premier league season, Bangor introduced an all yellow kit, which they retained for a few seasons before reverting to yellow shirts and blue shorts in season 2010/11.

For season 2011/12, Bangor introduced a yellow and blue striped shirt for their home kit and a new white away shirt with yellow and blue trim. The kit was supplied by ONE.

Season 2012/13 saw Bangor revert to the popular yellow shirts with blue shorts, supplied by Nike. The main logo on the front of the shirt is for the RVH (Royal Victoria Hospital) Liver Support Group charity.

== Stadium ==
After much negotiation during 2012 and the early part of 2013, Bangor FC's application to Sport NI for grant aid was successful. With a matching loan from UCIT (Ulster Community Investment Trust) Bangor were able to proceed with their plan to lay a new 3G pitch at Clandeboye Park. Greg Seeley Consulting were appointed as Designers & Project Managers, while TAL Civil Engineering Limited were selected as the main contractors.

Aligned to the laying of the pitch, Bangor FC entered into an agreement with Shared Access Ltd which led to New Floodlights being put into place to complement the development of the ground. Work started on 24 June 2013 and the new ground was opened without much fanfare on 12 October 2013 when Bangor beat Knockbreda 2–0 in a Northern Ireland Football League Championship 1 match.

The new FIFA Approved 3G surface is 99 metres x 63 metres with a run off area of 2.5 metres. The playing surface is surrounded by a steel fence (replacing the old concrete wall) and a two-metre-wide (6.6 ft) tarmac walkway. The development allows spectators to access all sides of the ground for the first time in many years. The 3G facility is available for hire by the public and members of the local community. Early in 2014, Bangor FC became the first club in the Irish League to sell the naming rights of their ground, with Clandeboye Park becoming officially known as The Bangor Fuels Arena. This received a mixed response from the club's fans but an announcement from the club confirmed that the sponsorship deal with local business firm Bangor Fuels would be in place for the next five years. The deal includes shirt sponsorship, advertising around the ground as well as the naming rights.

Bangor FC has restored their stadium name to Clandeboye Park on Thursday 16 September 2021 after 8 years of affiliation with Bangor Fuels.

== Current squad ==
Note: Flags indicate national team as defined under FIFA eligibility rules; some limited exceptions apply. Players may hold more than one non-FIFA nationality.

No.	Pos.	Nation	Player
1	GK	NIR	Gareth Deane
2	DF	NIR	Caomhan McGuinness
3	DF	NIR	Reece Neale (vice-captain)
4	DF	NIR	Lewis Francis
5	DF	NIR	Harry Lynch
6	MF	NIR	Lewis Harrison (captain)
7	MF	NIR	Liam Hassin
8	MF	NIR	Tiarnan Mulvenna
9	FW	NIR	Ben Arthurs
10	FW	NIR	Ben Cushnie
12	MF	NIR	Steven McCullough
13	GK	ESP	Patrick Solis Grogan
15	MF	NIR	Jack O'Mahony

No.	Pos.	Nation	Player
16	DF	NIR	Alfie Mitchell
18	DF	NIR	Oisin Devlin
20	FW	SCO	Lucas McRoberts
21	FW	NIR	Jay Boyd
22	MF	NIR	Ross Ferguson
23	MF	SCO	MacKenzie Strachan
24	DF	ECU	Jeremi Rodriguez
27	GK	NIR	Lawton McMahon
28	DF	NIR	Stephen McGuinness
29	DF	WAL	Iestyn Hughes
30	MF	NIR	Liam Burns
32	DF	NIR	Zac Dickson
34	FW	NIR	Blake Matier

== European record ==
=== Overview ===
Competition	Matches	W	D	L	GF	GA
UEFA Cup	2	0	0	2	0	6
European Cup Winners' Cup / UEFA Cup Winners' Cup	4	0	1	3	2	8
TOTAL	6	0	1	5	2	14

=== Matches ===
Season	Competition	Round	Opponent	Home	Away	Aggregate
1991–92	UEFA Cup	1R	(Czechoslovakia) Sigma Olomouc	0–3	0–3	0–6
1993–94	European Cup Winners' Cup	QR	(Cyprus) APOEL	1–1	1–2	2–3
1994–95	UEFA Cup Winners' Cup	QR	(Slovakia) Tatran Prešov	0–1	0–4	0–5

== Managerial history ==
Tenure	Manager
1920–?	Tommy Stevenson
1929-1930	(England) Joe Clennell
1934–?	(Scotland) Tony Weldon
?-1938	Ben Jones
1939	(England) David Levene
?	Gerry Wright
?	Billy McDevitt
?	Andy Wylie
1947-1948	(England) Joe Duff
?	(England) Haydn Green
?	Lincoln Hyde
1951-1952	Gibby McKenzie
1953-1955	Chris Duffy
1955–1956	(England) Sammy Smyth
1957-1960	Billy Hanna
1961	Jim Lewis
1961	Pat McKay
1961–1964	Clancy McDermott
1964–1965	Charlie Tully
1965-1966	Roy Downey
1966	Billy Hanna
1966	Teddy Harte
1966–1968	Ralph McGuickan
1968	Dave Hickson
1968–1971	Charlie Tully
1971–1972	Alfie McMichael
1972–1977	Bertie Neill
1977-1978	Billy Neill
1978-1979	Jim Emery
1979-1981	(Northern Ireland) Billy Johnston
1981	Bertie Neill
1981-1982	Eric Halliday
1983–1985	Billy Humphries
1985–1988	Ronnie McQuillan
1988–1992	John Flanagan
1992–1994	Nigel Best
1994–1995	(Republic of Ireland) Roddy Collins
1995	Paul Malone
1995–1996	Andy Dougan / George Dunlop
1996–1997	(Northern Ireland) Stephen McBride
1997	(Northern Ireland) Colin McCurdy
1997	David Chisholm
1997–1999	Alan Campbell
1999–2001	Alan Fraser
2001–2003	Lee Doherty
2003–2005	Eric Halliday
2005–2007	(Northern Ireland) George Dunlop
2007–2008	(Northern Ireland) Paul Millar
2008–2009	(Northern Ireland) Marty Quinn
2009–2010	(Northern Ireland) Colin McCurdy
2010–2013	(Northern Ireland) Frankie Wilson
2013-2016	(Northern Ireland) Garth Scates
2016-2017	(Northern Ireland) Spike Hill
2017-2020	(Northern Ireland) Hugh Sinclair
2020–present	(Northern Ireland) Lee Feeney

== Honours ==
=== Senior honours ===
- Irish Cup: 1
  - 1992–93
- Irish League Cup: 1
  - 1992–93
- County Antrim Shield: 3
  - 1969–70, 1974–75, 1988–89
- NIFL Championship: 1
  - 2024–25
- Charity Shield: 1
  - 1993 (shared)
- City Cup: 2
  - 1970–71, 1975–76
- Ulster Cup: 2
  - 1991–92, 1994–95
- Mid-Ulster Cup: 1
  - 1995–96

=== Intermediate honours ===
- NIFL Premier Intermediate League: 1
  - 2022–23
- Irish League B Division Section 2: 2
  - 1993–94†, 1994–95†
- Irish Intermediate League: 3
  - 1940–41†, 1942–43†, 1943–44†
- Irish Intermediate Cup: 4
  - 1941–42†, 1943–44†, 1944–45†, 2013–14
- IFA Intermediate League Cup: 1
  - 2004–05
- George Wilson Cup: 3
  - 1992–93†, 1994–95†, 1997–98†
- Steel & Sons Cup: 7
  - 1923–24, 1940–41†, 1945–46†, 1994–95†, 2004–05, 2011–12, 2022–23
- McElroy Cup: 1
  - 1946–47†
- Ballymena & Provincial Football League: 1
  - 2018–19
- O'Gorman Cup: 1
  - 2017–18
- McReynolds Cup: 1
  - 2018–19

† Won by Bangor Reserves

=== Junior honours ===
- Beattie Cup: 1
  - 1907–08†

† Won by Bangor Reserves

== Notable former players ==
- (Northern Ireland) Gerry Armstrong
- (Northern Ireland) Harry Baird
- (Republic of Ireland) Paul Byrne
- (Scotland) Willie Fernie
- (Northern Ireland) Bill Irwin
- (Northern Ireland) Jimmy Jones
- (Republic of Ireland) Tommy McConville
- (Northern Ireland) Colin McCurdy
- (Northern Ireland) Terry Neill
