= 2023 IIHF World Championship Division II =

Ice Hockey world championships

Tournament details
- Host countries: Spain; Turkey
- Venues: 2 (in 2 host cities)
- Dates: 16–22 April; 17–23 April
- Teams: 12

The 2023 IIHF World Championship Division II were two international ice hockey tournaments run by the International Ice Hockey Federation.

The Group A tournament was held in Madrid, Spain from 16 to 22 April and the Group B tournament in Istanbul, Turkey from 17 to 23 April 2023.

Spain won the Group A tournament and got promoted, while Iceland finished last, but Georgia was later disqualified by the IIHF and relegated. The United Arab Emirates won Group B and got promoted and Mexico was relegated.

== Group A tournament ==
2023 IIHF World Championship Division II A

Tournament details
- Host country: Spain
- Venue: 1 (in 1 host city)
- Dates: 16–22 April
- Teams: 6

Tournament statistics
- Games played: 15
- Goals scored: 120 (8 per game)
- Attendance: 8,117 (541 per game)
- Scoring leader: (Croatia) Borna Rendulić (11 points)

Official website
- Website

=== Participants ===
Team	Qualification
Australia	Placed 3rd in Division II A in 2019.
Croatia	Placed 3rd in Division II A in 2022.
Spain	Host, placed 4th in Division II A in 2022.
Israel	Placed 5th in Division II A in 2022.
Iceland	Placed 1st in Division II B in 2022 and was promoted.
Georgia	Placed 2nd in Division II B in 2022 and was promoted.

=== Match officials ===
Four referees and seven linesmen were selected for the tournament.

Referees	Linesmen
(Japan) Goro Terakado; (Netherlands) Ramon Sterkens; (Serbia) Štefan Požar; (Spain) Alexei Roshchyn	(France) Cyril Debuche; (Japan) Masa Hashimoto; (Norway) Niklas Wilhelmsen; (Poland) Michał Gerne; (Spain) Sergio Biec; (Spain) Carlos Trobajo; (Switzerland) Dario Fuchs

=== Standings ===
After the tournament was completed, the IIHF invalidated the results of Georgia and assigned it zero points in the IIHF World Ranking. Georgia was relegated to Division II B for 2024, while Iceland, the last-placed team, retained its place in this division.

Pos	Team	Pld	W	OTW	OTL	L	GF	GA	GD	Pts	Promotion or relegation
1	Spain (H)	5	5	0	0	0	30	9	+21	15	Promoted to the 2024 Division I B
2	Georgia	5	4	0	0	1	20	8	+12	12	Relegated to the 2024 Division II B
3	Croatia	5	3	0	0	2	26	18	+8	9	
4	Australia	5	1	0	0	4	16	22	−6	3 (Note: Australia 3 points, +4 GD; Israel 3 points, −2 GD; Iceland 3 points, −2 GD; Israel 7–3 Iceland)	
5	Israel	5	1	0	0	4	14	37	−23	3	
6	Iceland	5	1	0	0	4	14	26	−12	3	

Source: IIHF
Rules for classification: 1) points; 2) head-to-head points; 3) head-to-head goal difference; 4) head-to-head number of goals scored; 5) result against closest best-ranked team outside tied teams; 6) result against second-best ranked team outside tied teams; 7) seeding before tournament.
(H) Host

=== Results ===
All times are local (UTC+2)

16 April 2023; 12:30	Georgia	4–1 (2–0, 1–1, 1–0)	Iceland	Pista de Hielo, Madrid; Attendance: 77

Game reference

Ivan Starostin
Goalies
Jakob Johannesson
Referee:
(Serbia) Štefan Požar
Linesmen:
(Spain) Sergio Biec
(Poland) Michał Gerne

Kurbatov (Bukiya) (PP) – 02:42	1–0
Marov (Bukiya) (PP) – 10:19	2–0
Slesarev (Kurbatov) (SH) – 26:04	3–0
	3–1	31:08 – Arnarsson (Maack, Eggertsson)
Bukiya (EN) – 56:04	4–1

12 min
Penalties
8 min
24
Shots
34

16 April 2023; 16:00	Australia	4–6 (0–3, 4–2, 0–1)	Croatia	Pista de Hielo, Madrid; Attendance: 117

Game reference

Anthony Kimlin
Goalies
Vilim Rosandić
Referee:
(Spain) Alexei Roshchyn
Linesmen:
(France) Cyril Debuche
(Spain) Carlos Trobajo

	0–1	02:04 – Jović (Kanaet, Smolec)
	0–2	04:53 – Mikulić (Smolec, Čanić) (PP)
	0–3	11:06 – Rendulić (B. Idžan)
	0–4	21:04 – V. Idžan (Rendulić, Marinković) (PP)
Pataky (Virjassov, Todd) – 30:17	1–4
Kubara (Darge, Kennedy) – 31:14	2–4
Haselhurst (Kennedy, Webster) – 33:39	3–4
	3–5	37:43 – Smolec (Jarčov, Marinković)
Newmark (Kubara, McGregor) – 38:59	4–5
	4–6	58:30 – Rendulić (Jarčov) (EN)

8 min
Penalties
2 min
28
Shots
28

16 April 2023; 19:30	Spain	8–2 (2–0, 5–1, 1–1)	Israel	Pista de Hielo, Madrid; Attendance: 1,150

Game reference

Raul Barbo
Goalies
Nir Tichon
Maksim Kaliaev
Referee:
(Netherlands) Ramon Sterkens
Linesmen:
(Switzerland) Dario Fuchs
(Norway) Niklas Wilhelmsen

Basile (Encinar) – 04:30	1–0
De Bonilla (Burgos) – 10:12	2–0
González (Rubio, Carbonell) (PP) – 22:07	3–0
	3–1	22:29 – Spektor (Mazour, Aharonovich)
Baldris (Rubio, Carbonell) – 23:50	4–1
Rubio (Encinar) – 25:01	5–1
Muratet (Calvo, Donath) – 36:03	6–1
Muñoz (Fernández) – 37:18	7–1
Capillas (De Bonilla, Muratet) (PP) – 47:39	8–1
	8–2	57:40 – Khubashvili (Milner, M. Kozhevnikov)

4 min
Penalties
12 min
53
Shots
15

17 April 2023; 12:30	Croatia	6–2 (2–0, 3–1, 1–1)	Iceland	Pista de Hielo, Madrid; Attendance: 64

Game reference

Vilim Rosandić
Goalies
Johann Ragnarsson
Referee:
(Spain) Alexei Roshchyn
Linesmen:
(France) Cyril Debuche
(Norway) Niklas Wilhelmsen

Vedlin (B. Idžan, Rendulić) – 01:22	1–0
Dobrić (Smolec, Čanić) – 08:39	2–0
	2–1	28:58 – Leifsson (Mikaelsson, Arason)
Čavlović (Mikulić, Čanić) – 30:27	3–1
B. Idžan (Rendulić) – 33:53	4–1
Čanić (Dobrić, Mikulić) (PP) – 37:26	5–1
V. Idžan (Marinković) – 44:03	6–1
	6–2	46:36 – Alengård (Hlynsson, Eggertsson)

4 min
Penalties
10 min
35
Shots
25

17 April 2023; 16:00	Israel	3–7 (2–1, 1–3, 0–3)	Georgia	Pista de Hielo, Madrid; Attendance: 76

Game reference

Maksim Kaliaev
Goalies
Ivan Starostin
Referee:
(Netherlands) Ramon Sterkens
Linesmen:
(Poland) Michał Gerne
(Spain) Carlos Trobajo

Raskin (Levin) – 10:58	1–0
Milner (Spektor, Kozhevnikov) – 12:59	2–0
	2–1	19:40 – Obolgogiani (Kurbatov) (PP2)
	2–2	21:04 – Kochkin (Dziov, Karelin) (PP2)
Spektor (Milner) – 23:22	3–2
	3–3	27:57 – Kurbatov (Obolgogiani)
	3–4	28:18 – Karelin
	3–5	44:31 – Karelin (Ermoshenko) (PP)
	3–6	58:11 – Karelin (Dziov) (EN)
	3–7	59:05 – Bukiya (Kurbatov) (EN)

14 min
Penalties
2 min
17
Shots
48

17 April 2023; 19:30	Spain	8–1 (2–0, 4–0, 2–1)	Australia	Pista de Hielo, Madrid; Attendance: 967

Game reference

Raul Barbo
Goalies
Anthony Kimlin
Referee:
(Japan) Goro Terakado
Linesmen:
(Switzerland) Dario Fuchs
(Japan) Masa Hashimoto

De Bonilla (Capillas, Torralba) – 13:45	1–0
Capillas (Guerra) – 15:30	2–0
Carbonell (Burgos, Baldris) – 20:38	3–0
Carbonell (Rubio, Burgos) – 22:56	4–0
González (Rubio, Carbonell) (PP) – 35:32	5–0
González (Capillas, Torralba) – 37:19	6–0
Carbonell (Baldris, Burgos) (PP) – 46:15	7–0
	7–1	50:46 – Virjassov (Kubara, Webster)
Burgos (Carbonell, Rubio) – 51:25	8–1

4 min
Penalties
14 min
41
Shots
23

19 April 2023; 12:30	Croatia	12–1 (4–1, 4–0, 4–0)	Israel	Pista de Hielo, Madrid; Attendance: 256

Game reference

Vito Nikolić
Goalies
Nir Tichon
Maksim Kaliaev
Referee:
(Serbia) Štefan Požar
Linesmen:
(Spain) Sergio Biec
(Switzerland) Dario Fuchs

Rendulić (B. Idžan, Bezuk) – 00:54	1–0
Jarčov (Rendulić) – 04:08	2–0
Mikulić – 09:21	3–0
	3–1	16:00 – Milner (Spektor, Levin) (PP)
Čanić (Dobrić, Silović) – 17:31	4–1
V. Idžan (Rendulić, Jarčov) – 23:26	5–1
Dimitrijević (Jović, Kanaet) – 28:18	6–1
Bezuk (Čanić, Mikulić) – 37:11	7–1
Rendulić (Čavlović) – 39:05	8–1
Mikulić (Dobrić) (PP) – 55:57	9–1
Marinković (Bezuk, Rendulić) – 56:34	10–1
Marinković (Silović, Rendulić) – 59:26	11–1
Kanaet (Dimitrijević, Čavlović) – 59:38	12–1

31 min
Penalties
16 min
55
Shots
25

19 April 2023; 16:00	Australia	2–4 (1–1, 1–0, 0–3)	Iceland	Pista de Hielo, Madrid; Attendance: 237

Game reference

Anthony Kimlin
Goalies
Jakob Johannesson
Referee:
(Japan) Goro Terakado
Linesmen:
(Japan) Masa Hashimoto
(Spain) Carlos Trobajo

Caruana (Landa, Kubara) – 11:42	1–0
	1–1	15:21 – Hafsteinsson (Arnarsson, Eggertsson)
Virjassov (Landa, Kennedy) (PP) – 32:10	2–1
	2–2	55:03 – Mikaelsson (Magnússon, Sveinsson)
	2–3	57:13 – Mikaelsson (Magnússon, Leifsson)
	2–4	59:24 – Leifsson (Magnússon, Mikaelsson) (EN)

11 min
Penalties
8 min
36
Shots
34

19 April 2023; 19:30	Spain	2–0 (0–0, 1–0, 1–0)	Georgia	Pista de Hielo, Madrid; Attendance: 1,169

Game reference
Raul Barbo	Goalies	Mikhail Fofanov	Referee: (Netherlands) Ramon Sterkens; Linesmen: (France) Cyril Debuche (Norway) Niklas Wilhelmsen
Donath (Muñoz, Zaballa) – 26:07 / 1–0; Muratet (Baldris, González) (EN) – 59:59 / 2–0			Referee: (Netherlands) Ramon Sterkens; Linesmen: (France) Cyril Debuche (Norway) Niklas Wilhelmsen
6 min	Penalties	10 min	Referee: (Netherlands) Ramon Sterkens; Linesmen: (France) Cyril Debuche (Norway) Niklas Wilhelmsen
27	Shots	25	Referee: (Netherlands) Ramon Sterkens; Linesmen: (France) Cyril Debuche (Norway) Niklas Wilhelmsen

21 April 2023; 12:30	Israel	1–7 (0–2, 1–3, 0–2)	Australia	Pista de Hielo, Madrid; Attendance: 374

Game reference

Maksim Kaliaev
Goalies
Anthony Kimlin
Referee:
(Serbia) Štefan Požar
Linesmen:
(Spain) Sergio Biec
(Norway) Niklas Wilhelmsen

	0–1	03:44 – Kennedy (Virjassov, Haselhurst)
	0–2	17:48 – Caruana (Kubara)
	0–3	25:16 – Caruana (Kubara, Darge)
Mazour (Ben Tov, Levin) (PP) – 29:41	1–3
	1–4	35:27 – Caruana (Kubara) (PP)
	1–5	39:30 – Virjassov (Landa) (PP)
	1–6	51:41 – Malloy (Taylor)
	1–7	58:43 – Malloy (Darge, Caruana) (PP)

16 min
Penalties
8 min
31
Shots
51

21 April 2023; 16:00	Georgia	6–0 (1–0, 1–0, 4–0)	Croatia	Pista de Hielo, Madrid; Attendance: 197

Game reference

Ivan Starostin
Goalies
Vilim Rosandić
Vito Nikolić
Referee:
(Spain) Alexei Roshchyn
Linesmen:
(France) Cyril Debuche
(Spain) Carlos Trobajo

Bukiya (Marov, Kozyulin) – 08:52	1–0
Slesarev (Karelin, Obolgogiani) – 27:19	2–0
Karelin (Obolgogiani) – 42:42	3–0
Obolgogiani (Karelin, Ermoshenko) (PP) – 44:23	4–0
Shvetsov (Kharizov, Ermoshenko) – 45:50	5–0
Dziov (Bukiya, Kozyulin) – 55:57	6–0

10 min
Penalties
6 min
32
Shots
24

21 April 2023; 19:30	Iceland	4–7 (1–2, 1–2, 2–3)	Spain	Pista de Hielo, Madrid; Attendance: 1,500

Game reference

Jakob Johannesson
Goalies
Raul Barbo
Referee:
(Japan) Goro Terakado
Linesmen:
(Poland) Michał Gerne
(Japan) Masa Hashimoto

	0–1	05:33 – Donath (Guerra, Zaballa)
Arason (Leifsson, Mikaelsson) – 13:05	1–1
	1–2	14:31 – Encinar (González, Capillas)
	1–3	23:41 – Muñoz (González, García)
	1–4	28:26 – Granell (Donath, Zaballa)
Jóhannsson (Björgvinsson) – 28:56	2–4
	2–5	42:53 – Baldris (Capillas)
Arnarsson (Jóhannesson) – 43:52	3–5
	3–6	48:16 – Torralba (Baldris, García)
	3–7	52:58 – Granell (Donath)
Rúnarsson (Alengård, Hlynsson) – 59:22	4–7

2 min
Penalties
8 min
16
Shots
37

22 April 2023; 12:30	Australia	2–3 (1–0, 0–3, 1–0)	Georgia	Pista de Hielo, Madrid; Attendance: 195

Game reference

Charles Smart
Goalies
Mikhail Fofanov
Referee:
(Spain) Alexei Roshchyn
Linesmen:
(Spain) Sergio Biec
(France) Cyril Debuche

Caruana (Lodge) – 15:19	1–0
	1–1	27:28 – Ermoshenko (Slesarev, Kochkin)
	1–2	31:50 – Karelin (Kochkin, Obolgogiani)
	1–3	34:28 – Karelin (Kharizov, Marov)
Todd (Woodman, Kubara) (EA) – 58:29	2–3

8 min
Penalties
6 min
40
Shots
28

22 April 2023; 16:00	Iceland	3–7 (1–1, 2–4, 0–2)	Israel	Pista de Hielo, Madrid; Attendance: 260

Game reference

Jakob Johannesson
Goalies
Nir Tichon
Referee:
(Japan) Goro Terakado
Linesmen:
(Switzerland) Dario Fuchs
(Spain) Carlos Trobajo

	0–1	02:05 – Levin (Spektor, Milner)
Mikaelsson (Leifsson, Eggertsson) – 12:51	1–1
Arason (Mikaelsson, Magnússon) (PP) – 22:02	2–1
	2–2	23:52 – Aharonovich (Spektor)
	2–3	30:56 – Levin
Jóhannsson (Arason, Alengård) – 31:25	3–3
	3–4	36:17 – Milner (Levin) (SH)
	3–5	39:23 – Milner (Levin, M. Kozhevnikov) (PP)
	3–6	49:17 – Milner (Levin)
	3–7	59:22 – Spektor (Levin, E. Kozhevnikov) (PP, EA)

10 min
Penalties
8 min
41
Shots
30

22 April 2023; 19:30	Croatia	2–5 (2–1, 0–1, 0–3)	Spain	Pista de Hielo, Madrid; Attendance: 1,500

Game reference

Vilim Rosandić
Goalies
Raul Barbo
Referee:
(Netherlands) Ramon Sterkens
Linesmen:
(Poland) Michał Gerne
(Japan) Masa Hashimoto

Jarčov – 07:24	1–0
Kegalj (Jarčov, V. Idžan) (SH) – 10:06	2–0
	2–1	11:18 – Donath (Fernández, García) (PP)
	2–2	20:33 – González (Encinar)
	2–3	53:06 – Donath (Muñoz)
	2–4	57:20 – Rubio (Carbonell, Fernández)
	2–5	58:06 – Muratet (Fernández, Encinar) (PP)

10 min
Penalties
6 min
24
Shots
36

=== Statistics ===
==== Scoring leaders ====
List shows the top skaters sorted by points, then goals.

Player	GP	G	A	Pts	+/−	PIM	POS
(Croatia) Borna Rendulić	5	4	7	11	+2	4	F
(Georgia (country)) Ivan Karelin	5	6	3	9	+6	8	F
(Israel) David Levin	5	2	7	9	−3	0	F
(Spain) Dorian Donath	5	5	3	8	+6	0	F
(Israel) Aviv Milner	5	5	3	8	0	8	F
(Spain) Alejandro Carbonell	5	3	5	8	+6	2	F
(Spain) Gastón González	5	4	3	7	+8	4	F
(Iceland) Andri Mikaelsson	5	3	4	7	−1	0	F
(Israel) Ilya Spektor	5	3	4	7	−4	8	F
(Australia) Casey Kubara	5	1	6	7	−1	0	F

GP = Games played; G = Goals; A = Assists; Pts = Points; +/− = Plus/Minus; PIM = Penalties in Minutes; POS = Position
Source: IIHF.com

==== Goaltending leaders ====
Only the top five goaltenders, based on save percentage, who have played at least 40% of their team's minutes, are included in this list.

Player	TOI	GA	GAA	SA	Sv%	SO
(Georgia (country)) Ivan Starostin	180:00	4	1.33	75	94.67	1
(Spain) Raul Barbo	300:00	9	1.80	103	91.26	1
(Australia) Anthony Kimlin	238:28	17	4.28	131	87.02	0
(Israel) Maksim Kaliaev	170:03	19	6.70	142	86.62	0
(Croatia) Vilim Rosandić	225:50	16	4.25	114	85.96	0

TOI = time on ice (minutes:seconds); SA = shots against; GA = goals against; GAA = goals against average; Sv% = save percentage; SO = shutouts
Source: IIHF.com

=== Awards ===
Position	Player
Goaltender	(Spain) Raul Barbo
Defenceman	(Spain) Bruno Baldris
Forward	(Croatia) Borna Rendulić

== Group B tournament ==
2023 IIHF World Championship Division II B

Tournament details
- Host country: Turkey
- Venue: 1 (in 1 host city)
- Dates: 17–23 April
- Teams: 6

Tournament statistics
- Games played: 15
- Goals scored: 124 (8.27 per game)
- Attendance: 1,565 (104 per game)
- Scoring leader: (United Arab Emirates) Sergei Kuznetsov (16 points)

Official website
- Website

=== Participants ===
Team	Qualification
New Zealand	Placed 3rd in Division II B in 2019.
Belgium	Placed 3rd in Division II B last year.
Bulgaria	Placed 4th in Division II B last year.
Mexico	Placed 5th in Division II B last year.
United Arab Emirates	Placed 1st in Division III A last year and was promoted.
Turkey	Host, placed 2nd in Division III A last year and was promoted.

=== Match officials ===
Four referees and seven linesmen were selected for the tournament.

Referees	Linesmen
(Australia) Robert Love-Dekazos; (Croatia) Trpimir Piragić; (Germany) Bastian Steingross; (Kazakhstan) Konstantin Chubenko	(China) Chi Hongda; (Croatia) Tomislav Grozaj; (Germany) Wayne Gerth; (United Kingdom) Nathan Carmichael; (Netherlands) Lodewijk Beelen; (Turkey) Berkay Aslanbey; (Turkey) Taha Kavlakoğlu

=== Standings ===
Pos	Team	Pld	W	OTW	OTL	L	GF	GA	GD	Pts	Promotion or relegation
1	United Arab Emirates	5	5	0	0	0	35	10	+25	15	Promoted to the 2024 Division II A
2	Belgium	5	4	0	0	1	33	10	+23	12	
3	Bulgaria	5	3	0	0	2	19	20	−1	9	
4	New Zealand	5	2	0	0	3	15	22	−7	6	
5	Turkey (H)	5	1	0	0	4	12	26	−14	3	
6	Mexico	5	0	0	0	5	10	36	−26	0	Relegated to the 2024 Division III A

Source: IIHF
Rules for classification: 1) points; 2) head-to-head points; 3) head-to-head goal difference; 4) head-to-head number of goals scored; 5) result against closest best-ranked team outside tied teams; 6) result against second-best ranked team outside tied teams; 7) seeding before tournament.
(H) Host

=== Results ===
All times are local (UTC+3).

17 April 2023; 13:00	New Zealand	1–4 (0–0, 0–1, 1–3)	Belgium	Zeytinburnu Ice Rink, Istanbul; Attendance: 51

Game reference

Joel Hasselman
Goalies
Arne Waumans
Referee:
(Kazakhstan) Konstantin Chubenko
Linesmen:
(Turkey) Berkay Aslanbey
(Netherlands) Lodewijk Beelen

	0–1	29:21 – Kolyasnikov (Cuylen, Pyl)
	0–2	45:58 – Coolen (Steyaert, Bogaerts) (PP)
Vortanov (Nicholls) – 49:57	1–2
	1–3	53:43 – Van den Bogaert (Van Espen)
	1–4	54:02 – Verelst (Coolen)

8 min
Penalties
4 min
11
Shots
56

17 April 2023; 16:30	Bulgaria	4–2 (1–1, 2–0, 1–1)	Mexico	Zeytinburnu Ice Rink, Istanbul; Attendance: 63

Game reference

Dimitar Dimitrov
Goalies
Tomas Payro
Referee:
(Croatia) Trpimir Piragić
Linesmen:
(United Kingdom) Nathan Carmichael
(Turkey) Taha Kavlakoğlu

	0–1	01:51 – Majul (PP)
Gatchev (Yotov) (PP) – 05:00	1–1
Nakov (Muhachev) – 27:58	2–1
Vasilev – 30:23	3–1
	3–2	44:01 – Tapia (A. Valencia, Matsubara) (PP2)
Vasilev (Dilkov, V. Dikov) – 55:35	4–2

31 min
Penalties
14 min
31
Shots
28

17 April 2023; 20:30	Turkey	0–8 (0–3, 0–4, 0–1)	United Arab Emirates	Zeytinburnu Ice Rink, Istanbul; Attendance: 85

Game reference

Eren Demirtürk
Tolga Bozacı
Goalies
Mate Tomljenović
Referee:
(Germany) Bastian Steingross
Linesmen:
(Germany) Wayne Gerth
(Croatia) Tomislav Grozaj

0–1	07:57 – Zakharau (Chuikov, Kuznetsov)
0–2	11:11 – Klavdiev (Kuznetsov, Shapavalau) (PP)
0–3	11:50 – Kuznetsov (Al-Humaidi, Binsammoud)
0–4	23:17 – Chuikov (Kuznetsov, Zakharau)
0–5	25:27 – Kuznetsov (Chuikov) (PP)
0–6	30:20 – Chuikov (Zakharau, J. Al-Dhaheri)
0–7	37:53 – Zakharau (J. Al-Dhaheri, Chuikov) (PP)
0–8	55:02 – Zakharau (Chuikov, Remess)

10 min
Penalties
4 min
27
Shots
46

18 April 2023; 13:00	Bulgaria	7–2 (4–0, 0–0, 3–2)	New Zealand	Zeytinburnu Ice Rink, Istanbul; Attendance: 63

Game reference

Dimitar Dimitrov
Goalies
Csaba Kercsó-Magos
Joel Hasselman
Referee:
(Australia) Robert Love-Dekazos
Linesmen:
(China) Chi Hongda
(Turkey) Taha Kavlakoğlu

Yotov (Tchaliov) – 01:31	1–0
Vasilev (Boyadjiev) (SH) – 09:52	2–0
Yotov (Tchaliov) – 17:19	3–0
V. Dikov (Vasilev) – 18:31	4–0
Dilkov (V. Dikov, Gatchev) (PP) – 40:49	5–0
Yotov (V. Dikov) – 48:31	6–0
	6–1	48:52 – Vortanov (Dallimore)
Dilkov – 49:44	7–1
	7–2	59:15 – Challis (Polozov)

39 min
Penalties
10 min
46
Shots
29

18 April 2023; 16:30	Belgium	3–4 (0–2, 1–2, 2–0)	United Arab Emirates	Zeytinburnu Ice Rink, Istanbul; Attendance: 78

Game reference

Arne Waumans
Jelle Lievens
Goalies
Mate Tomljenović
Referee:
(Germany) Bastian Steingross
Linesmen:
(Turkey) Berkay Aslanbey
(Germany) Wayne Gerth

	0–1	01:37 – Al-Haddad (Klavdiev, Vukoja)
	0–2	04:53 – Chuikov (Kuznetsov, Tomljenović)
	0–3	21:59 – Kuznetsov (Zakharau) (PP)
	0–4	25:08 – Usenka (Klavdiev)
Steyaert (Blockx, James) – 25:59	1–4
Steyaert (Gyesbreghs, James) (PP) – 47:50	2–4
Gyesbreghs (Steyaert) – 55:25	3–4

6 min
Penalties
10 min
50
Shots
21

18 April 2023; 20:30	Mexico	0–5 (0–3, 0–1, 0–1)	Turkey	Zeytinburnu Ice Rink, Istanbul; Attendance: 185

Game reference

Tomas Payro
Marcello de Antuñano
Goalies
Tolga Bozacı
Referee:
(Kazakhstan) Konstantin Chubenko
Linesmen:
(Netherlands) Lodewijk Beelen
(United Kingdom) Nathan Carmichael

0–1	09:09 – Meydancı (Aydın, Odabaş)
0–2	15:59 – Gökçen (Aydin, Faner)
0–3	17:21 – Kavaz (Bingöl)
0–4	25:58 – Faner (Bakal, Savaş) (PP)
0–5	49:25 – Tayğar (Savaş, Bakal) (PP)

14 min
Penalties
39 min
36
Shots
28

20 April 2023; 13:00	New Zealand	1–7 (1–1, 0–4, 0–2)	United Arab Emirates	Zeytinburnu Ice Rink, Istanbul; Attendance: 54

Game reference

Csaba Kercsó-Magos
Goalies
Mate Tomljenović
Referee:
(Kazakhstan) Konstantin Chubenko
Linesmen:
(Netherlands) Lodewijk Beelen
(Croatia) Tomislav Grozaj

Louw (Joyce, Dallimore) – 02:38	1–0
	1–1	04:40 – Zakharau (Shapavalau)
	1–2	25:25 – J. Al-Dhaheri (Kuznetsov)
	1–3	26:30 – Kuznetsov (J. Al-Dhaheri, Zakharau)
	1–4	29:54 – Klavdiev
	1–5	34:56 – Chuikov (Vukoja, Zakharau)
	1–6	46:57 – Zakharau (Bassayev, Chuikov)
	1–7	48:01 – Kuznetsov (Al-Humaidi)

4 min
Penalties
6 min
23
Shots
57

20 April 2023; 16:30	Belgium	11–2 (4–0, 4–2, 3–0)	Mexico	Zeytinburnu Ice Rink, Istanbul; Attendance: 45

Game reference

Jelle Lievens
Goalies
Tomas Payro
Marcello de Antuñano
Referee:
(Australia) Robert Love-Dekazos
Linesmen:
(Turkey) Berkay Aslanbey
(Turkey) Taha Kavlakoğlu

Gyesbreghs (Verelst) (SH) – 09:10	1–0
Verelst (Van den Bogaert, Coolen) – 12:57	2–0
Cuylen (Blanchy) – 14:48	3–0
Coolen (Van den Bogaert) – 15:31	4–0
Gyesbreghs (James, Blockx) (PP) – 20:35	5–0
	5–1	22:46 – Chávez (Díaz)
James (Blockx) – 24:57	6–1
Van den Bogaert (Blanchy) (PP) – 34:55	7–1
Bosmans (Kolyasnikov, Gyesbreghs) – 36:20	8–1
	8–2	39:59 – Majul (Tapia, Cuellar)
Blockx (James, Gyesbreghs) – 40:38	9–2
Van den Bogaert (Verelst) – 51:25	10–2
Verelst (Cuylen) – 52:15	11–2

32 min
Penalties
18 min
65
Shots
14

20 April 2023; 20:30	Bulgaria	5–3 (1–0, 2–0, 2–3)	Turkey	Zeytinburnu Ice Rink, Istanbul; Attendance: 280

Game reference

Dimitar Dimitrov
Goalies
Tolga Bozacı
Referee:
(Croatia) Trpimir Piragić
Linesmen:
(China) Chi Hongda
(Germany) Wayne Gerth

Nakov (Stamenov, Georgiev) – 15:58	1–0
Georgiev (Boyadjiev) (SH) – 22:19	2–0
Tchaliov (Boyadjiev) – 34:36	3–0
	3–1	43:30 – Y. Karş (Bakal, Tayğar)
	3–2	46:12 – Ö. Karş (Kavaz, Bingöl)
	3–3	51:24 – Karakoç (Ö. Karş, Faner)
Dilkov (Vasilev, Tchaliov) – 59:42	4–3
K. Dikov (Georgiev) (EN) – 59:46	5–3

18 min
Penalties
6 min
36
Shots
36

21 April 2023; 13:00	Mexico	2–7 (1–2, 0–3, 1–2)	New Zealand	Zeytinburnu Ice Rink, Istanbul; Attendance: 43

Game reference

Tomas Payro
Marcello de Antuñano
Goalies
Joel Hasselman
Referee:
(Croatia) Trpimir Piragić
Linesmen:
(Turkey) Berkay Aslanbey
(Germany) Wayne Gerth

A. Valencia (Cuellar, L. Valencia) (PP) – 09:13	1–0
	1–1	14:01 – Craig (Cox, Challis)
	1–2	17:47 – Kozak (Polozov, Regan) (PP)
	1–3	26:14 – Henderson (Burns, Cox) (PP)
	1–4	32:16 – Orr (Kozak, Polozov)
	1–5	37:00 – Ellis (Challis, Burns) (PP)
Cuellar (García, Tapia) – 40:11	2–5
	2–6	40:35 – Kozak (Polozov)
	2–7	46:44 – Dallimore (Vortanov, Hayward)

16 min
Penalties
12 min
18
Shots
50

21 April 2023; 16:30	United Arab Emirates	7–2 (2–0, 5–1, 0–1)	Bulgaria	Zeytinburnu Ice Rink, Istanbul; Attendance: 87

Game reference

Mate Tomljenović
Goalies
Dimitar Dimitrov
Andrea Karabadjakov
Referee:
(Germany) Bastian Steingross
Linesmen:
(China) Chi Hongda
(Turkey) Taha Kavlakoğlu

Al-Humaidi (Shapavalau, Binsammoud) – 07:36	1–0
Klavdiev (Vukoja) (PP) – 19:59	2–0
Usenka (Zakharau, Kuznetsov) (PP) – 22:31	3–0
Usenka (Klavdiev, Al-Mahrooqi) – 22:47	4–0
Chuikov (Kuznetsov, Tomljenović) (PP) – 27:47	5–0
	5–1	29:42 – Vasilev (Dilkov, V. Dikov)
Binsammoud (Shapavalau) – 31:38	6–1
Klavdiev (SH) – 34:25	7–1
	7–2	50:52 – Yotov

4 min
Penalties
11 min
42
Shots
23

21 April 2023; 20:30	Turkey	2–9 (2–2, 0–4, 0–3)	Belgium	Zeytinburnu Ice Rink, Istanbul; Attendance: 428

Game reference

Tolga Bozacı
Goalies
Arne Waumans
Referee:
(Australia) Robert Love-Dekazos
Linesmen:
(United Kingdom) Nathan Carmichael
(Croatia) Tomislav Grozaj

Meydancı (Odabaş) – 01:27	1–0
Hars (Aydın) – 01:39	2–0
	2–1	05:32 – Gyesbreghs (Kolyasnikov)
	2–2	09:11 – James (Van Espen) (AG) (EA)
	2–3	23:36 – Verelst (Steyaert, Gyesbreghs) (PP)
	2–4	26:12 – Blockx (James, Gyesbreghs) (PP)
	2–5	31:15 – James (Verelst, Gyesbreghs)
	2–6	35:16 – Versin (Gyesbreghs, Bosmans)
	2–7	49:11 – Coolen (Blanchy) (PP2)
	2–8	49:52 – Gyesbreghs (Verelst)
	2–9	59:17 – Verelst (Blockx, Gyesbreghs) (PP)

23 min
Penalties
6 min
24
Shots
59

23 April 2023; 13:00	United Arab Emirates	9–4 (3–0, 1–2, 5–2)	Mexico	Zeytinburnu Ice Rink, Istanbul; Attendance: 48

Game reference

Ahmed Al-Dhaheri
Goalies
Marcello de Antuñano
Referee:
(Australia) Robert Love-Dekazos
Linesmen:
(China) Chi Hongda
(Turkey) Taha Kavlakoğlu

Kuznetsov (Vukoja) – 00:59	1–0
Vukoja (Remess) (SH) – 09:35	2–0
Klavdiev (Usenka, Kuznetsov) – 19:13	3–0
	3–1	20:32 – Tapia (Ayala, Cuellar)
	3–2	32:19 – Apud (Cuellar, Díaz)
M. Al-Dhaheri (Vukoja, Klavdiev) – 38:11	4–2
Zakharau (Shapavalau) – 45:20	5–2
Klavdiev (Kuznetsov, Usenka) – 45:32	6–2
J. Al-Dhaheri (Zakharau) (PP) – 48:00	7–2
	7–3	48:26 – E. Valencia (Rullan, Chávez) (PP)
J. Al-Dhaheri (Kuznetsov, Zakharau) – 51:18	8–3
J. Al-Dhaheri (Kuznetsov, Vukoja) (PP2) – 53:59	9–3
	9–4	57:28 – Cuellar (Tapia, Díaz)

14 min
Penalties
12 min
54
Shots
22

23 April 2023; 16:30	Belgium	6–1 (2–0, 2–1, 2–0)	Bulgaria	Zeytinburnu Ice Rink, Istanbul; Attendance: 55

Game reference

Arne Waumans
Goalies
Dimitar Dimitrov
Referee:
(Germany) Bastian Steingross
Linesmen:
(Turkey) Berkay Aslanbey
(United Kingdom) Nathan Carmichael

James (Steyaert, Blockx) – 11:20	1–0
Blockx (Steyaert, James) – 16:33	2–0
	2–1	21:50 – Tchaliov (Yotov, Boyadjiev)
Verelst (Van Espen, Coolen) – 30:28	3–1
Van den Bogaert (Verelst, Coolen) – 35:11	4–1
Blockx (Van Espen, James) – 50:24	5–1
Coolen (Verelst) (SH) – 51:49	6–1

8 min
Penalties
12 min
59
Shots
12

23 April 2023; 20:30	New Zealand	4–2 (4–0, 0–0, 0–2)	Turkey	Zeytinburnu Ice Rink, Istanbul; Attendance: 610

Game reference

Joel Hasselman
Goalies
Tolga Bozacı
Referee:
(Kazakhstan) Konstantin Chubenko
Linesmen:
(Netherlands) Lodewijk Beelen
(Croatia) Tomislav Grozaj

Orr (Kozak, Polozov) – 01:02	1–0
Henderson (Cox, Burns) (PP) – 08:21	2–0
Challis (Cox, Polozov) (PP) – 18:32	3–0
Nicholls (Orr, Polozov) – 18:58	4–0
	4–1	50:01 – Bakal (Faner) (PP)
	4–2	58:56 – Bakal (Faner, Tayğar) (PP)

16 min
Penalties
14 min
30
Shots
35

=== Statistics ===
==== Scoring leaders ====
List shows the top skaters sorted by points, then goals.

Player	GP	G	A	Pts	+/−	PIM	POS
(United Arab Emirates) Sergei Kuznetsov	5	8	9	17	+14	4	D
(United Arab Emirates) Maxim Zakharau	5	6	8	14	+9	0	F
(Belgium) Sam Verelst	5	6	7	13	+8	4	F
(Belgium) Vadim Gyesbreghs	5	5	8	13	+10	0	D
(United Arab Emirates) Artem Klavdiev	5	6	5	11	+6	6	F
(United Arab Emirates) Ilia Chuikov	5	5	5	10	+8	4	F
(Belgium) Alec James	5	4	6	10	+8	0	F
(Belgium) Dries Blockx	5	4	5	9	+6	0	F
(Belgium) Ben Coolen	5	4	4	8	+7	0	F
(United Arab Emirates) Juma Al-Dhaheri	5	2	5	7	+7	4	F
(Belgium) Iniaz Steyaert	5	2	5	7	+8	4	F

GP = Games played; G = Goals; A = Assists; Pts = Points; +/− = Plus/Minus; PIM = Penalties in Minutes; POS = Position
Source: IIHF.com

==== Goaltending leaders ====
Only the top five goaltenders, based on save percentage, who have played at least 40% of their team's minutes, are included in this list.

Player	TOI	GA	GAA	SA	Sv%	SO
(United Arab Emirates) Mate Tomljenović	240:00	6	1.50	117	95.12	1
(New Zealand) Joel Hasselman	221:29	11	2.98	120	91.60	0
(Belgium) Arne Waumans	200:20	5	1.50	52	91.23	0
(Turkey) Tolga Bozacı	239:34	15	3.76	138	90.20	1
(Bulgaria) Dimitar Dimitrov	269:32	19	4.23	164	89.62	0

TOI = time on ice (minutes:seconds); SA = shots against; GA = goals against; GAA = goals against average; Sv% = save percentage; SO = shutouts
Source: IIHF.com

=== Awards ===
Position	Player
Goaltender	(United Arab Emirates) Mate Tomljenović
Defenceman	(Belgium) Vadim Gyesbreghs
Forward	(United Arab Emirates) Maxim Zakharau
