= David Levin =

David Levin may refer to:

- David Levin (balloonist) (1948–2017), American balloonist
- David Levin (businessman) (born 1963), British businessman
- David Levin (ice hockey) (born 1999), Israeli ice hockey player
- David Levin (singer), American singer-songwriter
- David L. Levin (born 1949), American politician from Missouri
- David P. Levin (born 1958), American producer, director, writer and editor
- Dave Levin (1913–2004), American professional wrestler

== See also ==
- David Levine (disambiguation)
