= David Levene =

David Levene may refer to:

- David Levene (footballer) (1908–1970), English footballer
- David Levene (businessman) (1929–2021), New Zealand businessman and philanthropist

== See also ==
- David Levine (disambiguation)
