= 1974–75 County Antrim Shield =

Tournament details
- Country: Northern Ireland
- Teams: 14

Final positions
- Champions: Bangor (2nd win)
- Runners-up: Glentoran

Tournament statistics
- Matches played: 13
- Goals scored: 50 (3.85 per match)

The 1974–75 County Antrim Shield was the 86th edition of the County Antrim Shield, a cup competition in Northern Irish football.

Bangor won the tournament for the 2nd time, defeating Glentoran 2–1 in the final.

== Results ==
=== First round ===
Team 1	Score	Team 2
Ards	5–1	Lisburn Rangers
Ballyclare Comrades	1–4	Larne
Ballymena United	1–3	Glentoran II
Carrick Rangers	0–2	Distillery
Glentoran	2–0	Dundela
Linfield	2–3	Bangor
Cliftonville	bye	
Crusaders	bye	

=== Quarter-finals ===
Team 1	Score	Team 2
Bangor	4–2	Ards
Distillery	2–0	Crusaders
Glentoran	5–0	Cliftonville
Glentoran II	0–0 (3–1 p)	Larne

=== Semi-finals ===
Team 1	Score	Team 2
Bangor	4–1	Distillery
Glentoran	5–0	Glentoran II

=== Final ===
13 May 1975

Glentoran	1–2	Bangor
Feeney 25'	Report	Erskine 45'; Armstrong 70'; Jeffrey (red card) 85'

The Oval, Belfast
Referee: T. Perry (Newtownabbey)
