= 2024 IIHF World Championship Division II =

Ice hockey world championships

Tournament details
- Host countries: Serbia; Bulgaria
- Venues: 2 (in 2 host cities)
- Dates: 21–27 April; 22–28 April
- Teams: 12

The 2024 IIHF World Championship Division II is two international ice hockey tournaments run by the International Ice Hockey Federation.

The Group A tournament was held in Belgrade, Serbia, from 21 to 27 April and the Group B tournament in Sofia, Bulgaria, from 22 to 28 April 2024.

Croatia won Group A and got promoted to Division I, while Iceland was relegated. Group B was won by Belgium and saw Turkey getting relegated.

== Group A tournament ==
2024 IIHF World Championship Division II A

Tournament details
- Host country: Serbia
- City: Belgrade
- Venue: 1 (in 1 host city)
- Dates: 21–27 April
- Teams: 6

Tournament statistics
- Games played: 15
- Goals scored: 117 (7.8 per game)
- Attendance: 2,363 (158 per game)
- Scoring leader: (United Arab Emirates) Artem Klavdiev (13 points)

Official website
- www.iihf.com

The IIHF temporarily indicated that Israel would not participate, but two days later clarified that they will consider their participation in upcoming tournaments on a case by case basis.

=== Participants ===
Team	Qualification
Serbia	Host, placed 6th in Division I B in 2023 and was relegated.
Croatia	Placed 3rd in Division II A in 2023.
Australia	Placed 4th in Division II A in 2023.
Israel	Placed 5th in Division II A in 2023
Iceland	Placed 6th in Division II A in 2023.
United Arab Emirates	Placed 1st in Division II B in 2023 and was promoted.

=== Match officials ===
Five referees and seven linesmen were selected for the tournament.

Referees	Linesmen
(France) Nicolas Crégut; (Netherlands) Stef Oosterling; (Norway) Marcus Wannerstedt; (Poland) Bartosz Kaczmarek; (Ukraine) Andrii Kicha	(Canada) Nicholas Albinati; (China) Fu Dahe; (Croatia) Krešimir Polašek; (Croatia) Marko Saković; (Serbia) Uroš Mladenović; (Serbia) David Perduv; (United States) Patrick Dapuzzo

=== Standings ===
Pos	Team	Pld	W	OTW	OTL	L	GF	GA	GD	Pts	Promotion or relegation
1	Croatia	5	5	0	0	0	26	6	+20	15	Promoted to the 2025 Division I B
2	Serbia (H)	5	4	0	0	1	23	11	+12	12	
3	United Arab Emirates	5	3	0	0	2	25	21	+4	9	
4	Israel	5	1	1	0	3	17	26	−9	5	
5	Australia	5	1	0	1	3	15	19	−4	4	
6	Iceland	5	0	0	0	5	11	34	−23	0	Relegated to the 2025 Division II B

Source: IIHF
Rules for classification: 1) points; 2) head-to-head points; 3) head-to-head goal difference; 4) head-to-head number of goals scored; 5) result against closest best-ranked team outside tied teams; 6) result against second-best ranked team outside tied teams; 7) seeding before tournament.
(H) Host

=== Results ===
All times are local (UTC+2).

21 April 2024; 12:30	Croatia	11–2 (4–0, 4–2, 3–0)	Iceland	Pionir Ice Hall, Belgrade; Attendance: 25

Game reference

Vilim Rosandić
Goalies
Jóhann Ragnarsson
Referee:
(France) Nicolas Crégut
Linesmen:
(Canada) Nicholas Albinati
(Serbia) David Perduv

Marinković (Dobrić, Čanić) (PP) – 03:12	1–0
Jarčov (Janković, V. Idžan) – 09:53	2–0
V. Idžan (Janković) – 16:13	3–0
Jarčov (SH) – 19:12	4–0
Jarčov (Katić) – 20:33	5–0
Katić (Marinković, B. Idžan) – 24:39	6–0
	6–1	26:48 – Leifsson (Mikaelsson, Jóhannesson)
	6–2	30:22 – Hlynsson (Sverrisson) (SH)
Dimitrijević (Završki, Vedlin) – 35:03	7–2
Jarčov (V. Idžan, Rosandić) (PP) – 36:54	8–2
Janković (B. Idžan, Katić) – 50:35	9–2
B. Idžan (Čanić, Šimunković) (PP) – 56:00	10–2
B. Idžan (Slovinac, Jarčov) – 59:53	11–2

12 min
Penalties
8 min
37
Shots
25

21 April 2024; 16:00	United Arab Emirates	10–6 (2–2, 4–1, 4–3)	Israel	Pionir Ice Hall, Belgrade; Attendance: 40

Game reference

Maksim Rashchupkin
Goalies
Maksim Kaliaev
Nir Tichon
Referee:
(Poland) Bartosz Kaczmarek
Linesmen:
(United States) Patrick Dapuzzo
(Serbia) Uroš Mladenović

Likhachev (Klavdiev, Remess) – 03:00	1–0
	1–1	06:19 – Mazour (D. Levin, Kozhevnikov) (PP)
	1–2	13:13 – Polozov (M. Levin, D. Levin) (PP)
Likhachev (Badegyev, Shapavalau) (PP) – 19:53	2–2
Vukoja (Salvasser) – 22:11	3–2
	3–3	29:36 – D. Levin (M. Levin, Kozhevnikov) (PP)
Klavdiev (Likhachev) – 30:11	4–3
Chuikov (Likhachev, Remess) – 35:50	5–3
Kuznetsov (Chuikov) – 37:13	6–3
	6–4	40:25 – Polozov (D. Levin, Kozhevnikov)
	6–5	43:37 – Mazour
Klavdiev (Kuznetsov, Likhachev) – 44:56	7–5
Vukoja (Shapavalau, Salvasser) – 45:37	8–5
Chuikov (Klavdiev, Likhachev) (PP) – 51:50	9–5
	9–6	56:48 – Milner (Turner)
Likhachev (Shapavalau) – 59:11	10–6

8 min
Penalties
8 min
34
Shots
38

21 April 2024; 19:30	Australia	2–4 (1–1, 1–2, 0–1)	Serbia	Pionir Ice Hall, Belgrade; Attendance: 346

Game reference

Aleksi Toivonen
Goalies
Arsenije Ranković
Referee:
(Norway) Marcus Wannerstedt
Linesmen:
(Croatia) Krešimir Polašek
(Croatia) Marko Saković

Ruck (Webster, Kyros) – 04:44	1–0
	1–1	15:26 – Dragović (Đumić, Podunavac)
Kennedy (Virjassov, Todd) – 20:37	2–1
	2–2	23:42 – M. Popović (Anić)
	2–3	33:45 – Đumić (Podunavac, Dragović) (PP)
	2–4	53:44 – Đumić (Dragović)

12 min
Penalties
6 min
18
Shots
31

22 April 2024; 12:30	Iceland	2–7 (1–1, 1–6, 0–0)	United Arab Emirates	Pionir Ice Hall, Belgrade; Attendance: 20

Game reference

Jakob Jóhannesson
Goalies
Maksim Rashchupkin
Referee:
(Netherlands) Stef Oosterling
Linesmen:
(Serbia) David Perduv
(Croatia) Krešimir Polašek

Arnarsson (Eggertsson) – 03:42	1–0
	1–1	19:06 – Klavdiev (Likhachev, Chuikov)
	1–2	21:23 – Kuznetsov (Remess, Salvasser) (PP)
	1–3	21:53 – Kuznetsov (Salvasser)
	1–4	29:08 – Klavdiev (Kuznetsov) (SH)
	1–5	31:18 – Likhachev (Klavdiev) (PP)
	1–6	35:32 – Ramseyer (Vukoja)
Arason (Rúnarsson, Blöndal) – 38:17	2–6
	2–7	39:41 – Chuikov (Klavdiev)

6 min
Penalties
13 min
31
Shots
27

22 April 2024; 16:00	Croatia	3–2 (0–1, 2–1, 1–0)	Australia	Pionir Ice Hall, Belgrade; Attendance: 25

Game reference

Vilim Rosandić
Goalies
Aleksi Toivonen
Referee:
(France) Nicolas Crégut
Linesmen:
(Canada) Nicholas Albinati
(Serbia) Uroš Mladenović

	0–1	11:00 – B. Kubara (Kyros, Webster)
	0–2	27:03 – C. Kubara (Caruana, T. Kubara)
Kašparek (Završki, Dobrić) – 27:36	1–2
Jarčov (Dobrić, V. Idžan) (PP) – 34:46	2–2
Bebek (Selitaj, Vukadin) – 41:57	3–2

6 min
Penalties
8 min
45
Shots
19

22 April 2024; 19:30	Serbia	5–1 (1–0, 2–1, 2–0)	Israel	Pionir Ice Hall, Belgrade; Attendance: 375

Game reference

Arsenije Ranković
Goalies
Nir Tichon
Referee:
(Ukraine) Andri Kicha
Linesmen:
(United States) Patrick Dapuzzo
(China) Fu Dahe

Vučurević (Gvozdenović, Dinić) (PP) – 14:46	1–0
M. Mladenović (Gvozdenović, Subotić) (PP) – 24:49	2–0
Anić (Dragović, M. Popović) (SH) – 33:59	3–0
	3–1	34:33 – Kapulkin (Khubashvili) (PP)
Vučurević (Subotić, Racić) – 47:20	4–1
Racić (M. Mladenović, Vučurević) – 56:23	5–1

37 min
Penalties
39 min
59
Shots
26

24 April 2024; 12:30	Australia	4–5 GWS (2–0, 1–0, 1–4) (OT: 0–0) (SO: 0–1)	Israel	Pionir Ice Hall, Belgrade; Attendance: 30

Game reference

Aleksi Toivonen
Goalies
Maksim Kaliaev
Referee:
(France) Nicolas Crégut
Linesmen:
(Serbia) David Perduv
(Croatia) Marko Saković

Caruana (Woodman, C. Kubara) (PP) – 03:02	1–0
Webster (B. Kubara) – 03:54	2–0
Todd (Kennedy) – 22:05	3–0
	3–1	46:20 – Khvoles (Spektor, Kozev)
Allen (Webster, Virjassov) – 46:58	4–1
	4–2	47:38 – Khubashvili (Aharonovich, Kapulkin)
	4–3	59:01 – M. Levin (D. Levin, Mazour) (EA)
	4–4	59:45 – M. Levin (Turner, Mazour) (EA)

C. Kubara (miss)
Hawes (miss)
Todd (miss)
Virjassov (miss)
Kyros (miss)
Shootout
(miss) D. Levin
M. Levin
(miss) Kozhevnikov
(miss) Spektor
(miss) Marshchonak
2 min
Penalties
8 min
37
Shots
29

24 April 2024; 16:00	Croatia	4–1 (2–1, 1–0, 1–0)	United Arab Emirates	Pionir Ice Hall, Belgrade; Attendance: 22

Game reference

Vilim Rosandić
Goalies
Maksim Rashchupkin
Referee:
(Norway) Marcus Wannerstedt
Linesmen:
(United States) Patrick Dapuzzo
(Serbia) Uroš Mladenović

Završki (Marinković) – 06:23	1–0
	1–1	06:41 – Vukoja (Shapavalau, Badegyev)
Janković (Katić, Vedlin) (PP) – 19:39	2–1
Završki (Katić) – 26:52	3–1
Katić (Marinković) (PP) – 41:54	4–1

6 min
Penalties
10 min
53
Shots
28

24 April 2024; 19:30	Serbia	9–3 (3–1, 2–1, 4–1)	Iceland	Pionir Ice Hall, Belgrade; Attendance: 220

Game reference

Arsenije Ranković
Željko Bodiš
Goalies
Jakob Jóhannesson
Referee:
(Netherlands) Stef Oosterling
Linesmen:
(Canada) Nicholas Albinati
(China) Fu Dahe

	0–1	03:28 – Sverrisson (Arnarsson)
K. Mladenović (Ivanović, M. Mladenović) – 08:31	1–1
Dinić (Dragović, Anić) – 08:52	2–1
Gvozdenović (Dinić, Vučurević) (PP) – 17:10	3–1
Podunavac (M. Mladenović) – 22:08	4–1
	4–2	33:21 – Magnusson (Rúnarsson, Hafberg)
Zwick (Podunavac, M. Mladenović) – 35:29	5–2
	5–3	55:09 – Leifsson (Mikaelsson, Jóhannesson)
Kravljanac (Vučurević) (EN) – 56:45	6–3
Dinić (Subotić, Vučurević) (PP) – 58:22	7–3
Subotić (Gvozdenović, M. Mladenović) (PP2) – 59:11	8–3
Popović (Podunavac, Subotić) (PP) – 59:41	9–3

8 min
Penalties
8 min
39
Shots
23

25 April 2024; 12:30	Israel	1–5 (1–3, 0–1, 0–1)	Croatia	Pionir Ice Hall, Belgrade; Attendance: 20

Game reference

Maksim Kaliaev
Goalies
Vito Nikolić
Referee:
(Poland) Bartosz Kaczmarek
Linesmen:
(China) Fu Dahe
(Serbia) Uroš Mladenović

	0–1	01:45 – Marinković (Završki)
	0–2	06:21 – Dobrić (Janković, B. Idžan)
Marshchonak (D. Levin, Kozev) (SH) – 13:17	1–2
	1–3	19:34 – Marinković (V. Idžan, Janković) (PP)
	1–4	24:09 – Vedlin (Dimitrijević, Katić)
	1–5	43:17 – B. Idžan (Vedlin)

14 min
Penalties
12 min
36
Shots
36

25 April 2024; 16:00	Iceland	2–3 (0–2, 1–1, 0–1)	Australia	Pionir Ice Hall, Belgrade; Attendance: 35

Game reference

Jakob Jóhannesson
Goalies
Aleksi Toivonen
Referee:
(Norway) Marcus Wannerstedt
Linesmen:
(United States) Patrick Dapuzzo
(Croatia) Marko Saković

	0–1	13:44 – Woodman (Caruana, C. Kubara) (SH)
	0–2	17:00 – Hawes (Caruana)
	0–3	25:13 – Webster (Virjassov) (SH)
Arason (Sverrisson, Leifsson) (PP) – 33:20	1–3
Skúlason (Pálsson) (PP) – 45:08	2–3

8 min
Penalties
8 min
18
Shots
28

25 April 2024; 19:30	United Arab Emirates	2–5 (1–1, 0–1, 1–3)	Serbia	Pionir Ice Hall, Belgrade; Attendance: 340

Game reference

Maksim Rashchupkin
Goalies
Arsenije Ranković
Referee:
(Netherlands) Stef Oosterling
Linesmen:
(Canada) Nicholas Albinati
(Croatia) Krešimir Polašek

Kuznetsov (Chuikov) – 09:25	1–0
	1–1	15:03 – M. Popović (Dragović)
	1–2	24:15 – Đumić (Racić)
Kuznetsov (Vukoja) (PP) – 41:01	2–2
	2–3	49:47 – Dinić (M. Popović, M. Mladenović)
	2–4	54:44 – Kravljanac
	2–5	59:18 – M. Popović (M. Mladenović) (EN)

6 min
Penalties
8 min
25
Shots
37

27 April 2024; 12:30	Australia	4–5 (2–1, 1–2, 1–2)	United Arab Emirates	Pionir Ice Hall, Belgrade; Attendance: 25

Game reference

Aleksi Toivonen
Goalies
Maksim Rashchupkin
Referee:
(Ukraine) Andrii Kicha
Linesmen:
(Serbia) David Perduv
(Croatia) Marko Saković

Virjassov (Hawes, Todd) – 02:39	1–0
Woodman – 06:35	2–0
	2–1	07:54 – Kuznetsov (Klavdiev, Likhachev)
Kyros (Wardlaw) – 21:12	3–1
	3–2	30:46 – Klavdiev (Badegyev, Chuikov)
	3–3	33:43 – Likhachev (Chuikov, Klavdiev)
	3–4	48:32 – Badegyev (Shapavalau, Klavdiev)
C. Kubara (Woodman, Caruana) (PP) – 50:27	4–4
	4–5	59:19 – Chuikov (Klavdiev, Likhachev) (EN)

2 min
Penalties
4 min
28
Shots
30

27 April 2024; 16:00	Israel	4–2 (0–1, 1–0, 3–1)	Iceland	Pionir Ice Hall, Belgrade; Attendance: 40

Game reference

Maksim Kaliaev
Goalies
Jóhann Ragnarsson
Referee:
(Norway) Marcus Wannerstedt
Linesmen:
(Canada) Nicholas Albinati
(Croatia) Krešimir Polašek

	0–1	17:49 – Arason
M. Levin (Polozov, D. Levin) (PP) – 31:37	1–1
M. Levin (Mazour, D. Levin) (PP) – 52:01	2–1
Khvoles (Khubashvili) – 52:26	3–1
M. Levin (Kozev) (EN) – 55:56	4–1
	4–2	59:33 – Rúnarsson (Eggertsson)

10 min
Penalties
8 min
23
Shots
26

27 April 2024; 19:30	Serbia	0–3 (0–2, 0–1, 0–0)	Croatia	Pionir Ice Hall, Belgrade; Attendance: 800

Game reference

Arsenije Ranković
Goalies
Vilim Rosandić
Referee:
(Poland) Bartosz Kaczmarek
Linesmen:
(United States) Patrick Dapuzzo
(China) Fu Dahe

0–1	06:30 – Kašparek (Bebek, Šimunković)
0–2	11:45 – Katić (Marinković) (PP)
0–3	31:21 – B. Idžan (Katić, Vedlin) (PP)

35 min
Penalties
10 min
27
Shots
30

=== Statistics ===
==== Scoring leaders ====
List shows the top skaters sorted by points, then goals.

Player	GP	G	A	Pts	+/−	PIM	POS
(United Arab Emirates) Artem Klavdiev	5	5	8	13	+6	2	F
(United Arab Emirates) Dmitry Likhachev	5	5	7	12	+5	4	F
(United Arab Emirates) Ilia Chuikov	5	4	5	9	+5	0	F
(Croatia) Marko Katić	5	3	6	9	+6	0	D
(United Arab Emirates) Sergei Kuznetsov	5	6	2	8	+3	4	D
(Israel) David Levin	5	1	7	8	0	6	F
(Serbia) Marko Mladenović	5	1	7	8	+6	24	D
(Israel) Mike Levin	4	5	2	7	−2	31	F
(Croatia) Bruno Idžan	5	4	3	7	+2	0	F
(Croatia) Karlo Marinković	5	3	4	7	+2	0	F

GP = Games played; G = Goals; A = Assists; Pts = Points; +/− = Plus/Minus; PIM = Penalties in Minutes; POS = Position
Source: IIHF.com

==== Goaltending leaders ====
Only the top five goaltenders, based on save percentage, who have played at least 40% of their team's minutes, are included in this list.

Player	TOI	GA	GAA	SA	Sv%	SO
(Croatia) Vilim Rosandić	240:00	5	1.25	99	94.95	1
(Serbia) Arsenije Ranković	277:25	10	2.16	113	91.15	0
(United Arab Emirates) Maksim Rashchupkin	298:32	20	4.02	186	89.25	0
(Australia) Aleksi Toivonen	303:31	17	3.36	151	88.74	0
(Israel) Maksim Kaliaev	229:31	18	4.71	124	85.48	0

TOI = time on ice (minutes:seconds); SA = shots against; GA = goals against; GAA = goals against average; Sv% = save percentage; SO = shutouts
Source: IIHF.com

=== Awards ===
Position	Player
Goaltender	(Croatia) Vilim Rosandić
Defenceman	(Croatia) Marko Katić
Forward	(Serbia) Mirko Đumić

== Group B tournament ==
2024 IIHF World Championship Division II B

Tournament details
- Host country: Bulgaria
- City: Sofia
- Venue: 1 (in 1 host city)
- Dates: 22–28 April
- Teams: 6

Tournament statistics
- Games played: 15
- Goals scored: 120 (8 per game)
- Attendance: 3,058 (204 per game)
- Scoring leader: (Belgium) Sam Verelst (14 points)

Official website
- IIHF

=== Participants ===
Team	Qualification
Georgia	Disqualified from Division II A in 2023 and was relegated.
Belgium	Placed 2nd in Division II B in 2023.
Bulgaria	Host, placed 3rd in Division II B in 2023.
New Zealand	Placed 4th in Division II B in 2023.
Turkey	Placed 5th in Division II B in 2023.
Chinese Taipei	Placed 1st in Division III A in 2023 and was promoted.

=== Match officials ===
Four referees and seven linesmen were selected for the tournament.

Referees	Linesmen
(Croatia) Filip Metzinger; (Denmark) Kenneth Nielsen; (Spain) Alexey Roshchyn; (United States) Walker Holton	(Austria) Maxmillian Gatol; (Belgium) Maarten van den Acker; (Bulgaria) Martin Boyadjiev; (Czech Republic) David Klouček; (Denmark) Frederik Andersen; (Germany) Markus Merk; (Netherlands) Lodewijk Beelen

=== Standings ===
Pos	Team	Pld	W	OTW	OTL	L	GF	GA	GD	Pts	Promotion or relegation
1	Belgium	5	5	0	0	0	37	4	+33	15	Promoted to the 2025 Division II A
2	New Zealand	5	3	0	1	1	22	18	+4	10	
3	Georgia	5	3	0	0	2	20	17	+3	9	
4	Bulgaria (H)	5	1	1	0	3	17	29	−12	5	
5	Chinese Taipei	5	1	0	1	3	14	27	−13	4	
6	Turkey	5	0	1	0	4	10	25	−15	2	Relegated to the 2025 Division III A

Source: IIHF
Rules for classification: 1) points; 2) head-to-head points; 3) head-to-head goal difference; 4) head-to-head number of goals scored; 5) result against closest best-ranked team outside tied teams; 6) result against second-best ranked team outside tied teams; 7) seeding before tournament.
(H) Host

=== Results ===
All times are local (UTC+3).

22 April 2024; 13:00	Chinese Taipei	1–5 (1–0, 0–1, 0–4)	New Zealand	Winter Sports Palace, Sofia; Attendance: 70

Game reference

Hsiao Po-yu
Goalies
Joel Hasselman
Referee:
(Denmark) Kenneth Nielsen
Linesmen:
(Austria) Maxmillian Gatol
(Belgium) Maarten van den Acker

Lin H. (Lin Yi., Lin J.) – 02:26	1–0
	1–1	23:10 – Carey (Regan)
	1–2	45:11 – Amston (Burns, Attwell) (PP)
	1–3	48:47 – Fontaine (McIntosh, Amston)
	1–4	51:30 – Schneider (Fontaine, Tappin)
	1–5	57:22 – McIntosh (Strayer)

6 min
Penalties
6 min
23
Shots
40

22 April 2024; 16:30	Belgium	8–0 (0–0, 3–0, 5–0)	Turkey	Winter Sports Palace, Sofia; Attendance: 80

Game reference

Jelie Lievens
Goalies
Tolga Bozacı
Oğulcan Kızılkaya
Referee:
(Spain) Alexey Roshchyn
Linesmen:
(Bulgaria) Martin Boyadjiev
(Czech Republic) David Klouček

De Crook (Henry, Boni) – 23:18	1–0
Steyaert (Gyesgreghs, Verelst) – 27:56	2–0
Gyesbreghs (Blockx, James) (PP) – 34:18	3–0
De Smet – 41:11	4–0
Boni (De Smet, Henry) – 47:00	5–0
Blanchy (De Smet, Boni) – 47:14	6–0
Verelst (Steyaert) – 55:13	7–0
Coolen (Henry, De Smet) – 58:23	8–0

6 min
Penalties
8 min
39
Shots
11

22 April 2024; 20:00	Bulgaria	1–7 (1–1, 0–2, 0–4)	Georgia	Winter Sports Palace, Sofia; Attendance: 325

Game reference

Dimitar Dimitrov
Goalies
Ivan Starostin
Referee:
(United States) Walker Holton
Linesmen:
(Denmark) Frederik Andersen
(Germany) Markus Merk

	0–1	11:25 – Karelin (Bukiya)
Hodulov (Tchaliov, Gatchev) – 15:36	1–1
	1–2	26:29 – Dziov (Kireev)
	1–3	34:40 – Kozyulin (Dziov, Kireev)
	1–4	45:34 – Kurbatov (Marov) (PP)
	1–5	48:04 – Kochkin
	1–6	48:42 – Obolgogiani (Dziov, Ermoshenko)
	1–7	53:11 – Marov

6 min
Penalties
4 min
18
Shots
41

23 April 2024; 13:00	Turkey	5–4 GWS (0–1, 1–2, 3–1) (OT: 0–0) (SO: 1–0)	Chinese Taipei	Winter Sports Palace, Sofia; Attendance: 47

Game reference

Tolga Bozacı
Goalies
Hsiao Po-yu
Referee:
(Spain) Alexey Roshchyn
Linesmen:
(Bulgaria) Martin Boyadjiev
(Belgium) Maarten van den Acker

	0–1	19:38 – Chen K.
	0–2	22:32 – Pan (Wen, Shen Y.)
	0–3	23:00 – Wang Y.
Bakal (Karadağ) – 30:01	1–3
E. Faner (Y. Karş) – 41:38	2–3
	2–4	48:10 – Pan (Yang, Peng)
Ö. Karş (Bingöl, Demirdelen) – 48:25	3–4
Odabaş (Bakal, Karadağ) – 56:30	4–4

Demirdelen (miss)
Bakal
F. Faner (miss)
E. Faner
Y. Karş (miss)
Bakal (miss)
Bakal (miss)
E. Faner (miss)
Meydanci (miss)
Ö. Karş (miss)
Gökçen
Shootout
Chen K.
(miss) Lin H.
Shen Y.
(miss) Yang
(miss) Lin Yo.
(miss) Shen Y.
(miss) Lin H.
(miss) Wang P.
(miss) Wen
(miss) Peng
(miss) Shen Y.
2 min
Penalties
25 min
34
Shots
28

23 April 2024; 16:30	Georgia	2–6 (1–2, 0–2, 1–2)	New Zealand	Winter Sports Palace, Sofia; Attendance: 93

Game reference

Ivan Starostin
Mikhail Fofanov
Goalies
Csaba Kercso-Magos
Referee:
(United States) Walker Holton
Linesmen:
(Netherlands) Lodewijk Beelen
(Germany) Markus Merk

Bukiya (Dumbadze, Marov) (PP) – 07:38	1–0
	1–1	07:59 – McIntosh (Strayer, Harrison)
	1–2	14:14 – Amston (Attwell) (PP)
	1–3	20:53 – Strayer (McIntosh, Amston)
	1–4	32:45 – Attwell (Amston, Dalmatau) (PP)
	1–5	42:43 – Vortanov
Kharizov (Romanov, Kurbatov) – 43:42	2–5
	2–6	53:26 – Fontaine (Simon, Kozák)

8 min
Penalties
6 min
36
Shots
32

23 April 2024; 20:00	Belgium	11–1 (3–0, 5–1, 3–0)	Bulgaria	Winter Sports Palace, Sofia; Attendance: 352

Game reference

Jelle Lievens
Goalies
Dimitar Dimitrov
Andrea Karabadjakov
Referee:
(Croatia) Filip Metzinger
Linesmen:
(Austria) Maxmillian Gatol
(Czech Republic) David Klouček

Blanchy (Van Espen, Verelst) – 01:09	1–0
Gyesgreghs (Blockx, James) (PP) – 11:54	2–0
De Smet (Neven) (PP) – 19:01	3–0
Verelst (James, Gyesgreghs) (PP) – 21:51	4–0
Verelst (Ziarny) – 24:05	5–0
Gyesbreghs (De Smet, Henry) (PP2) – 33:02	6–0
Henry (Cuylen, Steyaert) – 34:09	7–0
	7–1	35:21 – Hodulov
Boni (De Smet, Blanchy) – 38:44	8–1
Verelst (James, Gyesgreghs) (PP) – 48:32	9–1
Gyesgreghs (Blockx) (PP) – 54:19	10–1
Blockx (James, Coolen) – 58:55	11–1

8 min
Penalties
18 min
53
Shots
7

25 April 2024; 13:00	Georgia	3–2 (0–1, 2–1, 1–0)	Turkey	Winter Sports Palace, Sofia; Attendance: 75

Game reference

Ivan Starostin
Goalies
Tolga Bozacı
Referee:
(Denmark) Kenneth Nielsen
Linesmen:
(Denmark) Frederik Andersen
(Netherlands) Lodewijk Beelen

	0–1	03:36 – Karadağ (Odabaş, Demirdelen)
	0–2	29:49 – Demirdelen
Karelin (Obolgogiani) – 31:33	1–2
Karelin (Obolgogiani) – 33:34	2–2
Karelin (Obolgogiani, Kireev) – 44:18	3–2

10 min
Penalties
10 min
25
Shots
19

25 April 2024; 16:30	Belgium	8–1 (3–1, 3–0, 2–0)	Chinese Taipei	Winter Sports Palace, Sofia; Attendance: 76

Game reference

Ignace Van Noten
Goalies
Kuei Fu-hsiang
Referee:
(Croatia) Filip Metzinger
Linesmen:
(Bulgaria) Martin Boyadjiev
(Austria) Maxmillian Gatol

Steyaert (Verelst) – 00:48	1–0
Verelst (De Crook, Piccart) – 03:17	2–0
	2–1	07:39 – Shen Y. (Wen, Lin Yo.) (PP)
Coolen (Gentri, Gyesgreghs) – 16:21	3–1
De Crook (Verelst, Steyaert) – 21:05	4–1
Henry (Ziarny) – 21:37	5–1
De Smet (Henry, Van Espen) – 29:05	6–1
Steyaert (De Crook, Henry) (PP) – 46:01	7–1
Steyaert (Verelst, De Crook) – 55:21	8–1

2 min
Penalties
6 min
40
Shots
11

25 April 2024; 20:00	Bulgaria	7–6 GWS (4–2, 2–2, 0–2) (OT: 0–0) (SO: 1–0)	New Zealand	Winter Sports Palace, Sofia; Attendance: 483

Game reference

Dimitar Dimitrov
Goalies
Joel Hasselman
Referee:
(Spain) Alexey Roshchyn
Linesmen:
(Czech Republic) David Klouček
(Germany) Markus Merk

Hodulov (Yotov, Vasilev) (PP) – 01:38	1–0
	1–1	06:21 – Schneider (McIntosh, Burns) (PP)
Nakov (K. Dikov, Stamenov) (PP) – 10:25	2–1
Yotov (Muhachev) (PP) – 12:53	3–1
	3–2	13:28 – Fontaine (Carey, Hayward)
Gatchev (Nakov, Nikolov) – 13:51	4–2
Yotov (Hodulov, Vasilev) (PP) – 20:31	5–2
	5–3	24:09 – Amston (McIntosh)
	5–4	26:39 – Fontaine (Amston, Schneider)
Hodulov (Tchaliov, V. Dikov) – 29:28	6–4
	6–5	44:12 – Amston (Strayer, Schneider)
	6–6	59:40 – Amston (Burns, Carey) (EA)

Yotov
Nakov
Hodulov
Shootout
(miss) Amston
(miss) Schneider
(miss) Dalmatau
18 min
Penalties
20 min
27
Shots
33

27 April 2024; 13:00	New Zealand	0–6 (0–1, 0–4, 0–1)	Belgium	Winter Sports Palace, Sofia; Attendance: 90

Game reference

Csaba Kercso-Magos
Goalies
Jelle Lievens
Referee:
(Denmark) Kenneth Nielsen
Linesmen:
(Denmark) Frederik Andersen
(Netherlands) Lodewijk Beelen

0–1	01:59 – Henry (De Smet)
0–2	25:22 – De Smet (Henry)
0–3	34:02 – De Crook (James, Steyaert)
0–4	37:48 – De Crook (Verelst, Gyesgreghs)
0–5	39:15 – De Smet (Henry, Neven)
0–6	49:51 – Boni (Henry)

4 min
Penalties
2 min
12
Shots
46

27 April 2024; 16:30	Turkey	1–5 (0–0, 1–3, 0–2)	Bulgaria	Winter Sports Palace, Sofia; Attendance: 640

Game reference

Tolga Bozacı
Goalies
Dimitar Dimitrov
Referee:
(Denmark) Kenneth Nielsen
Linesmen:
(Denmark) Frederik Andersen
(Netherlands) Lodewijk Beelen

Karakoç (Meydanci) – 22:24	1–0
	1–1	26:04 – Dilkov (K. Dikov)
	1–2	32:20 – Stamenov
	1–3	35:39 – Nikolov (Nakov, Atanasov)
	1–4	57:29 – Gatchev (EN)
	1–5	59:27 – Vasilev (Muhachev)

81 min
Penalties
81 min
31
Shots
28

27 April 2024; 20:00	Chinese Taipei	4–6 (1–2, 2–1, 1–3)	Georgia	Winter Sports Palace, Sofia; Attendance: 104

Game reference

Hsiao Po-yu
Goalies
Mikhail Fofanov
Ivan Starostin
Referee:
(Croatia) Filip Metzinger
Linesmen:
(Bulgaria) Martin Boyadjiev
(Belgium) Maarten van den Acker

	0–1	01:22 – Kozyulin (Bukiya)
Wen (Chen K., Shen Y.) – 05:08	1–1
	1–2	08:51 – Karelin (Ermoshenko)
	1–3	22:21 – Shvetsov
Lin H. – 25:49	2–3
Lin Yo. (Wen) (PP) – 26:07	3–3
	3–4	40:54 – Karelin (Kurbatov) (PP)
	3–5	41:59 – Bukiya (Kochkin)
Peng – 51:42	4–5
	4–6	56:03 – Bukiya (Kochkin)

8 min
Penalties
2 min
19
Shots
46

28 April 2024; 13:00	New Zealand	5–2 (2–0, 1–1, 2–1)	Turkey	Winter Sports Palace, Sofia; Attendance: 77

Game reference

Csaba Kercso-Magos
Goalies
Tolga Bozacı
Referee:
(Denmark) Kenneth Nielsen
Linesmen:
(Netherlands) Lodewijk Beelen
(Belgium) Maarten van den Acker

Fontaine (Harrison, Burns) – 10:23	1–0
Fontaine (Schneider, Carey) – 10:56	2–0
Attwell (SH) – 33:22	3–0
	3–1	38:06 – Y. Karş (E. Faner, Demirdelen) (PP)
Fontaine (Schneider) (EA) – 44:26	4–1
Strayer (Harrison, McIntosh) (PP) – 52:49	5–1
	5–2	55:55 – Karadağ (Bingöl, Demirdelen) (PP)

35 min
Penalties
6 min
12
Shots
28

28 April 2024; 16:30	Bulgaria	3–4 (1–0, 1–3, 1–1)	Chinese Taipei	Winter Sports Palace, Sofia; Attendance: 350

Game reference

Andrea Karabadjakov
Goalies
Hsiao Po-yu
Referee:
(Spain) Alexey Roshchyn
Linesmen:
(Denmark) Frederik Andersen
(Austria) Maxmillian Gatol

V. Dikov (Muhachev) – 11:48	1–0
	1–1	22:15 – Chen K. (Pan)
Nakov (Gatchev, Hodulov) (PP) – 34:46	2–1
	2–2	36:53 – Lin H. (Sang)
	2–3	37:42 – Lin Yo. (Pan)
	2–4	58:51 – Wen (EN)
Iskrenov (K. Dikov, Hodulov) (EA) – 59:30	3–4

8 min
Penalties
4 min
36
Shots
38

28 April 2024; 20:00	Georgia	2–4 (2–1, 0–2, 0–1)	Belgium	Winter Sports Palace, Sofia; Attendance: 86

Game reference

Ivan Starostin
Goalies
Jelle Lievens
Referee:
(United States) Walker Holton
Linesmen:
(Czech Republic) David Klouček
(Germany) Markus Merk

Obolgogiani (Ermoshenko) (PP) – 07:59	1–0
Shvetsov (Marov) – 08:28	2–0
	2–1	17:36 – Van Espen
	2–2	34:17 – Gyesgreghs (De Crook, Verelst) (PP)
	2–3	34:45 – Gyesgreghs (De Crook, Verelst)
	2–4	57:53 – De Crook (Verelst)

8 min
Penalties
6 min
15
Shots
32

=== Statistics ===
==== Scoring leaders ====
List shows the top skaters sorted by points, then goals.

Player	GP	G	A	Pts	+/−	PIM	POS
(Belgium) Sam Verelst	5	5	9	14	+11	2	F
(Belgium) Bryan Henry	5	3	9	12	+11	4	F
(Belgium) Vadim Gyesbreghs	5	6	5	11	+12	4	D
(Belgium) Oliver De Crook	5	5	6	11	+12	2	F
(Belgium) Yoren De Smet	5	5	6	11	+12	0	F
(New Zealand) Stefan Amston	5	5	4	9	+9	2	D
(New Zealand) Jackson Fontaine	5	7	1	8	+5	2	F
(Belgium) Iniaz Steyaert	4	4	4	8	+12	2	F
(Bulgaria) Ivan Hodulov	5	5	2	7	−2	33	F
(New Zealand) Colin McIntosh	5	2	5	7	+6	2	F

GP = Games played; G = Goals; A = Assists; Pts = Points; +/− = Plus/Minus; PIM = Penalties in Minutes; POS = Position
Source: IIHF.com

==== Goaltending leaders ====
Only the top five goaltenders, based on save percentage, who have played at least 40% of their team's minutes, are included in this list.

Player	TOI	GA	GAA	SA	Sv%	SO
(Belgium) Jelle Lievens	240:00	3	0.75	45	93.33	2
(New Zealand) Csaba Kercso-Magos	180:00	10	3.33	110	90.91	0
(Chinese Taipei) Hsiao Po-yu	245:00	18	4.41	155	88.39	0
(Georgia (country)) Ivan Starostin	246:33	12	2.92	96	87.50	0
(Bulgaria) Dimitar Dimitrov	209:05	19	5.45	125	84.80	0

TOI = time on ice (minutes:seconds); SA = shots against; GA = goals against; GAA = goals against average; Sv% = save percentage; SO = shutouts
Source: IIHF.com

=== Awards ===
Position	Player
Goaltender	(Belgium) Jelle Lievens
Defenceman	(New Zealand) Stefan Amston
Forward	(Belgium) Sam Verelst
