= 1988–89 County Antrim Shield =

Tournament details
- Country: Northern Ireland
- Teams: 16

Final positions
- Champions: Bangor (3rd win)
- Runners-up: Glentoran

Tournament statistics
- Matches played: 15
- Goals scored: 46 (3.07 per match)

The 1988–89 County Antrim Shield was the 100th edition of the County Antrim Shield, a cup competition in Northern Irish football.

Bangor won the tournament for the 3rd time, defeating Glentoran 2–1 in the final. For the 3rd year running the County Antrim FA invited three clubs from County Armagh to compete (Glenavon, Newry Town and Portadown).

== Results ==
=== First round ===
Team 1	Score	Team 2
Ards	0–4	Newry Town
Ballyclare Comrades	2–3	Dundela
Ballymena United	3–0	Linfield
Bangor	3–2	Glenavon
Cliftonville	3–0	Comber Recreation
Distillery	0–2	Carrick Rangers
Larne	1–3	Glentoran
Portadown	3–1	Crusaders

=== Quarter-finals ===
Team 1	Score	Team 2
Bangor	1–0	Carrick Rangers
Cliftonville	0–3	Ballymena United
Glentoran	2–0	Portadown
Newry Town	4–0	Dundela

=== Semi-finals ===
Team 1	Score	Team 2
Bangor	1–0	Newry Town
Glentoran	2–0	Ballymena United

=== Final ===
15 May 1989

Bangor	2–1 (a.e.t.)	Glentoran
Campbell 79'; Gibson 112'; Eddis (red card) 52'		Cleary 84' (pen.); Morrison (red card) 117'

Seaview, Belfast
Referee: David Magill (Belfast)
