= David Levine (disambiguation) =

David Levine (1926–2009) was an American artist and illustrator.

David Levine may also refer to:

- David D. Levine (born 1961), American science fiction writer
- David F. Levine (born 1965), American author and physical therapy professor
- David K. Levine (born c.1955), American economist and game theorist
- David M. Levine (born 1970), American conceptual artist and professor
- David Levine (politician) (1883–1972), Seattle, Washington politician
- David Levine (photographer) (born 1960), British photographer
- David Levine (executive), Canadian music and television executive
- David Levine (racing driver) (born 1993), American racing driver
- David B. Levine (born 1932), American orthopaedic surgeon, administrator, professor and historian of medicine

== See also ==
- Raphael David Levine (born 1938), Israeli chemist
- David Levin (disambiguation)
- David Levene (disambiguation)
