= David Levin (ice hockey) =

Israeli ice hockey player

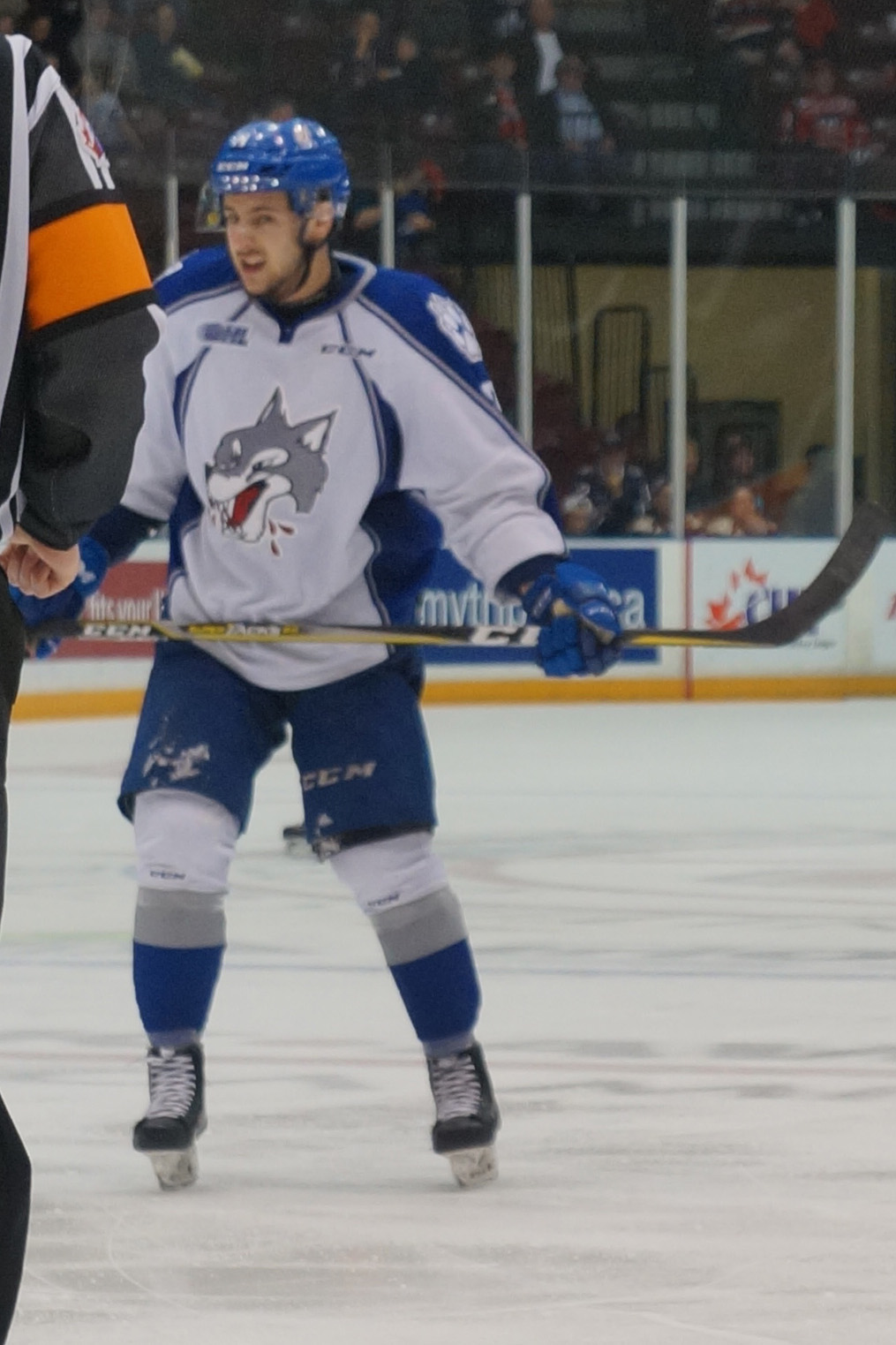
- Levin with the Sudbury Wolves in 2017
- Born: September 16, 1999 (age 27) Tel Aviv, Israel
- Height: 5 ft 10 in (178 cm)
- Weight: 181 lb (82 kg; 12 st 13 lb)
- Position: Left wing
- Shoots: Left
- Erste Liga team Former teams: CSM Corona Brașov; Dinamo Riga; HK Zemgale/LLU; Kristianstads IK; Bratislava Capitals; Nottingham Panthers; HSC Csíkszereda
- National team: Israel
- NHL draft: Undrafted
- Playing career: 2020–present

David Levin (Hebrew: דוד לוין, Russian: Давид Левин; born September 16, 1999) is an Israeli professional ice hockey player. He currently plays for CSM Corona Brașov in the Erste Liga (ice hockey).

He previously played for the Sudbury Wolves of the Ontario Hockey League (OHL) and for Dinamo Riga of the Kontinental Hockey League.

Born in Israel, Levin initially only played inline hockey due to the scarcity of ice rinks in Israel. At the age of 12 he moved to Canada in order to pursue a hockey career, living with relatives in the Greater Toronto Area, and it was in Canada that Levin first played organized ice hockey. He was drafted first overall in the 2015 OHL Priority Selection, and began playing for the Wolves in the 2015–16 season. Internationally Levin has played for the Israel national team.

== Personal life ==
Levin was born in Tel Aviv, Israel, to Pavel and Lena Levin, and is Jewish. Pavel is originally from Riga, Latvia, and was a professional soccer player in Latvia before signing with Maccabi Tel Aviv F.C. in 1990 and moving to Israel. He retired soon after due to a leg injury, and married Lena, who was from Moscow and moved to Netanya, Israel, and then to Zoran, Israel. David has a younger brother, Mike, who in 2018 as a 13-year-old had already received offers from the Vaughan Kings and Toronto Junior Canadians of the Greater Toronto Hockey League.

Levin was eight years old when he first discovered North American ice hockey, as his father was watching an NHL game on TV. "I asked him what he's watching. He told me that's the best league in the world, so I told him that's my dream now," Levin told The Jerusalem Post. At home Levin spoke Russian, while in school he used Hebrew; prior to moving to Canada he did not speak any English, and in order to develop a facility with English he decided to not attend a Hebrew-language school.

Due to the scarcity of ice rinks in Israel, with the closest rink a four-hour drive, Levin grew up playing inline hockey at a roller rink in Netanya, starting when he was four-years-old. He played starting in 2010 in several tournaments in Europe for the Israeli national inline team, winning awards in the process, but desired to play ice hockey instead. While he tried skating at the Canada Center in Metula, it did not go well and his ice hockey dream faded until he saw a YouTube clip of the development of player Sidney Crosby.

When he was 12, and despite not speaking English, Levin moved to Richmond Hill, Ontario, in the York Region, in order to further his hockey career, and lived with his aunt, uncle, and cousin Alla, Yafim and Rebecca Tovberg, who had previously lived in Israel. The Tovbergs subsequently moved into Toronto so that Levin would be able to play in a more competitive league.

As an Israeli citizen, Levin is required to serve three years with the Israel Defence Forces, and had to register for the draft when he turned 18 in September 2017. However, as that much time away from playing hockey would effectively end his career, he was able to obtain a deferment - initially until June 2018, after the 2018 NHL entry draft. He is now expected to return to Israel to serve when he is 26 years old.

== Playing career ==
Levin attended The Hill Academy in Vaughan, just north of Toronto, a school known for developing elite sports talent. He also joined the Greater Toronto Hockey League's Don Mills Flyers, an Ontario triple-A junior club in the highest youth hockey division, for the 2014–15 season, which named him alternate captain. During that season he scored 39 goals and 41 assists for 80 points in 55 games. Don Mills made the league final, with Levin tying for the tournament lead in scoring, though they lost in overtime.

However, because Levin was originally from Israel and did not live with his parents, the Ontario Hockey League (OHL), one of three major junior hockey leagues in Canada, was not going to allow him to enter the 2015 OHL Priority Selection; instead he would have had to wait another year and enter the league as an import (a foreign player). This was appealed, with the argument that his aunt and uncle were both his legal guardians and Canadian citizens, and Levin was granted an exception.

Allowed to be drafted, the Sudbury Wolves in Ontario selected the 15-year-old Levin first overall, and he was awarded the Jack Ferguson Award, awarded to the first-overall selection, as a result. Sudbury coach David Matsos said: "You can teach a lot of things. You can teach kids how to skate better, put weight on and do those sorts of things in the weight room. But you can't teach hockey sense. This guy thinks at a different level. He is probably one of the most elite, skilled players that I've seen." Levin noted: "Coincidentally, the main colors of the Sudbury jersey are the Israeli colors of blue and white. Because that makes me think of Israel, when I'm stepping on the ice, I try to do my best for people in Israel including those who think they can be hockey players too. I want to show everyone they should never give up."

Levin played his first OHL game in September 2015 just after turning 16 years old, and finished the 2015–16 season with nine goals and 21 assists (30 points) in 41 games, though he missed 19 games due to a broken hand. He also playing 5 games for Canada Black in the World U-17 Hockey Challenge.

He improved in the 2016–17 season to 18 goals and 35 assists for 53 points in 66 games, good for second on the team in scoring, and helped Sudbury reach the playoffs, where he was second on the team with six points in six games.

In the 2017–18 season, he was an alternate captain on Sudbury, and had an injury-plagued season and fell to 29 points in 46 games.

In the 2018–19 season, he sustained a knee injury in late October 2018 that resulted in him missing the majority of the second half of the season.

After the 2019–20 season, in which Levin had 27 goals and 46 assists in 57 contests, he received the Gord Ewin Most Improved Award with the Wolves. As of 2020, he had the eighth-most games played in a Wolves uniform, at 259.

He attended the 2018 Toronto Maple Leafs development camp, and played in the 2018 Traverse City NHL rookie prospect tournament with the Carolina Hurricanes. In September 2019, he attended rookie camp with Arizona Coyotes, and participated in the Coyotes main veteran's training camp.

On October 23, 2020, Levin signed a tryout contract with Dinamo Riga of the Kontinental Hockey League. After playing 14 games and scoring 1 goal in the KHL, he moved to HC Zemgale/LUA of the Latvian Hockey Higher League. He ended the season in Kristianstads IK, the last-placed team in the HockeyAllsvenskan, and helped them avoid relegation to the Hockeyettan with a win in a survival play-in series.

On July 22, 2021, Levin signed with the Bratislava Capitals of the ICE Hockey League. Following his tenure with Bratislava, in September 2022, Levin agreed to terms with UK EIHL side Nottingham Panthers.

For the 2023–24 season, Levin moved to Romania to join Erste Liga side HSC Csíkszereda.

== International play ==
In 2015 Levin was invited to try out at the Hockey Canada under-17 development camp, and was selected to play on one of the three teams Canada sent to the World U-17 Hockey Challenge. At the 2015 tournament he recorded one assist in five games. The World U-17 Hockey Challenge is not sanctioned by the International Ice Hockey Federation (IIHF), so Levin is not regarded as a Canadian for international play, and is still eligible to play for the Israel men's national ice hockey team; however, he has expressed an interest to play for Canada in the future. He joined the Israeli national team for the 2023 World Championship Division IIA tournament.

== Playing style ==
When he first joined Sudbury, Levin was praised for his offensive skills. Throughout his time with the Wolves, Levin was recognized for his hockey sense. David Matsos, his coach there, called him "one of the most elite, skilled players" he'd ever seen; this Levin credited to his father, who served as his first coach in Israel and runs a hockey school there. Levin also developed his defensive skills during his second season with Sudbury, which he showed during the 2017 playoffs. Due to his late start to ice skating, Levin's major weakness was originally his overall skating, though he worked to improve it.

== Career statistics ==
=== Regular season and playoffs ===
			Regular season					Playoffs
Season	Team	League	GP	G	A	Pts	PIM	GP	G	A	Pts	PIM
2013–14	Don Mills Flyers	GTHL	1	0	0	0	2	—	—	—	—	—
2014–15	Don Mills Flyers	GTHL	55	39	41	80	32	8	7	7	14	2
2015–16	Sudbury Wolves	OHL	47	9	21	30	20	—	—	—	—	—
2016–17	Sudbury Wolves	OHL	66	18	35	53	49	6	1	5	6	10
2017–18	Sudbury Wolves	OHL	46	14	15	29	37	—	—	—	—	—
2018–19	Sudbury Wolves	OHL	43	18	24	42	43	8	4	3	7	13
2019–20	Sudbury Wolves	OHL	57	27	46	73	39	—	—	—	—	—
2020–21	Dinamo Riga	KHL	14	1	0	1	4	—	—	—	—	—
2020–21	HK Zemgale/LLU	LAT	3	0	2	2	4	—	—	—	—	—
2020–21	Kristianstads IK	Allsv	15	5	5	10	4	—	—	—	—	—
2021–22	Bratislava Capitals	ICEHL	6	1	5	6	2	—	—	—	—	—
2022–23	Nottingham Panthers	EIHL	50	11	25	36	18	3	1	2	3	2
2023–24	HSC Csíkszereda	Erste Liga	37	26	33	59	17	12	9	10	19	0
KHL totals			14	1	0	1	4	—	—	—	—	—

=== International ===
Year	Team	Event	GP	G	A	Pts	PIM
2015	Canada Black	U17	5	0	1	1	12
Junior totals			5	0	1	1	12

- Source:Elite Prospects

== Awards and achievements ==
=== OHL ===
Awards	Year
Jack Ferguson Award	2015

== See also ==
- List of select Jewish ice hockey players

Awards and achievements
Preceded by Jakob Chychrun	Jack Ferguson Award; 2015	Succeeded by Ryan Merkley
