= David Matsos =

Canadian ice hockey player

- Born: November 12, 1973 (age 52) Burlington, Ontario, Canada
- Height: 6 ft 1 in (185 cm)
- Weight: 201 lb (91 kg; 14 st 5 lb)
- Position: Left wing
- Shot: Right
- Played for: AHL; Adirondack Red Wings; Hamilton Bulldogs
- National team: Canada
- NHL draft: Undrafted
- Playing career: 1996–2006

David Matsos (born November 12, 1973) is a Canadian former professional ice hockey player. He served as the head coach for the Sudbury Wolves in the Ontario Hockey League until May 23, 2017. On June 14, 2017, OHL's Hamilton Bulldogs announced that Dave Matsos joined the organization as an associate coach.

On May 16, 1996, after winning a silver medal with Team Canada at the 1996 Men's World Ice Hockey Championships, Matsos signed a multi-year contract as a free agent with the Tampa Bay Lightning.
