= David Levene (footballer) =

English footballer

Personal information
- Full name: David Jack Levene
- Date of birth: 25 February 1908
- Place of birth: Bethnal Green, England
- Date of death: 1970 (aged 61–62)
- Height: 5 ft 8 1/2 in (1.74 m)
- Position: Defender

Senior career*
Years	Team	Apps	(Gls)
–	Hugonians		
1930–1932	Northfleet United		
1932–1935	Tottenham Hotspur	8	(0)
1935–1936	Crystal Palace	22	(0)
1938	Clapton Orient		
- * Club domestic league appearances and goals

David Jack Levene (25 February 1908 – 1970) was an English footballer who played for Hugonians, Northfleet United, Tottenham Hotspur, Crystal Palace and Clapton Orient.

== Football career ==
Levene began his career at non-league team Hugonians before joining the Tottenham Hotspur "nursery" club Northfleet United. In 1932 the defender signed for Tottenham. Levene went on to feature in 12 matches in all competitions for the "Lilywhites". He later played for Crystal Palace where he appeared on 23 occasions in all competitions After playing professional football in France, Levene ended his playing career at Clapton Orient.
