= Abdulla Al-Humaidi =

Kuwaiti businessman and investor

- Born: January 1986 (age 40); Kuwait
- Education: Royal College of Surgeons, Dublin (medical studies); University of Leicester (MBA, with distinction)
- Occupations: Businessman, investor
- Years active: 2000s–present
- Organization: Kuwaiti European Holdings (KEH)
- Known for: Founder of London Resort Company Holdings; owner of Ebbsfleet United F.C.
- Title: Former chairman, Ebbsfleet United F.C.
- Board member of: KEH, London Resort Company Holdings

Abdulla Al-Humaidi (born January 1986) is a Kuwaiti businessman and investor, known for his involvement in various real estate, leisure, and sports ventures in the United Kingdom and the Middle East. He was the founder of the London Resort Company Holdings, which attempted to develop a large theme park on the Swanscombe Peninsula in Kent. Al-Humaidi is the owner of English football club Ebbsfleet United F.C. through his company Kuwaiti European Holdings (KEH). His business dealings have attracted media attention, including reports of financial difficulties, legal proceedings, and regulatory scrutiny.

== Early life and education ==
Al-Humaidi was born in Kuwait and later pursued medical studies at the Royal College of Surgeons in Dublin, Ireland. He subsequently obtained a Master of Business Administration (MBA) with distinction from the University of Leicester in the United Kingdom. Despite his medical training, he did not enter the healthcare profession and instead pursued a career in business.

== Business career ==
Al-Humaidi established the investment firm Kuwaiti European Holdings (KEH), which operated across various sectors including real estate, healthcare, and leisure. Under his leadership, KEH expanded into the United Kingdom during the early 2010s, acquiring assets in Kent and elsewhere. He held senior executive and board positions in companies operating in Kuwait, Saudi Arabia, Ireland, and the UK.

=== Ebbsfleet United F.C. ===
In 2013, Al-Humaidi acquired Ebbsfleet United F.C. through KEH Sports Ltd, with the stated aim of transforming the club into an English Football League side. His tenure involved significant investment in the club and its facilities. However, the period was marked by operational difficulties, including reports of delayed wage payments and financial constraints. The club was relegated from the National League at the end of the 2024–25 season. In 2023, Al-Humaidi resigned as chairman following his personal bankruptcy, and family members assumed various roles within the club’s ownership structure through to a change of ownership in August 2026.

=== London Resort project ===
In 2014, Al-Humaidi launched the London Resort, a planned £3.5 billion theme park and leisure complex on the Swanscombe Peninsula in Kent. The project was announced with high-profile branding partnerships and was designated a Nationally Significant Infrastructure Project. Despite initial support, the development faced planning delays and environmental objections, particularly following the designation of its location as a Site of Special Scientific Interest in 2021. The project ultimately collapsed into insolvency in 2023, with administrators appointed and accusations of financial mismanagement raised in subsequent legal proceedings.

=== Bankruptcy, legal issues and convictions ===
In November 2023, Al-Humaidi was declared bankrupt in the United Kingdom in relation to debts associated with the London Resort. Legal proceedings in the UK examined his continued involvement in company affairs post-bankruptcy. Separately, Al-Humaidi has been convicted in absentia of multiple offences in Kuwait, including fraud and financial misconduct. He has disputed the validity of several convictions and maintained that some charges were resolved or under appeal.

=== Northfleet Harbourside development ===
Following the collapse of the London Resort, KEH-affiliated entities shifted focus to the Northfleet Harbourside regeneration project in Kent, a £1 billion development adjacent to the Ebbsfleet United stadium. The scheme includes plans for a new stadium, housing, commercial units, and public infrastructure. While officially led by Landmarque Property Group and Ebbsfleet United, records have indicated ongoing connections between the development and companies previously associated with Al-Humaidi. A public inquiry into the project was launched in 2025, with both support and opposition from various stakeholders. In August 2026, planning permission for the development was refused over fears it might expose residents to "highly toxic lead poisoning".
