= Ice hockey in Turkmenistan =

- Country: Turkmenistan
- Governing body: Turkmenistan Ice Hockey Federation
- National team(s): Men's national team
- First played: 2013

National competitions
- Turkmenistan Championship

International competitions
- IIHF World Championships; Asian Winter Games

Ice hockey is a minor sport that is gaining popularity in Turkmenistan.

== History ==
Ice hockey never gained popularity in independent post-Soviet Turkmenistan until the president Saparmurat Niyazov ordered the construction of an Ice Palace in the desert foothills of the Kopet Dag. In 2006, the company Bouygues completed construction of the first Ice Palace. In 2011, the country opened the second Ice Palace worth €134.4 million. The total area of the new sports palace is 107,000 square meters, and in its center is the ice arena measuring 60 by 30 meters.

Turkmenistan became a member of the International Ice Hockey Federation (IIHF) on 15 May 2015. It has been a full member of the IIHF and was the third former Soviet republic from Central Asia after Kazakhstan and Kyrgyzstan to join the IIHF.

The first national team was formed in 2011, comprising players from Ashgabat-based teams: Oguzkhan, Alp Arslan, Shir, and Burgut. In 2013, the under-20 national team played its first game against Minsk City, which was won by 7–2. In 2016, Turkmenistan played its first game against Ashgabat, which was won by 12–2.

In 2017, Turkmenistan made its international debut at the 2017 Asian Winter Games in Sapporo, Japan. Turkmenistan played in Division II and their first official game against Malaysia, winning by 9–2, and later went on to win the division by defeating Kyrgyzstan, 7–3 in the final. Their third game against Iran, won by 12–2, but their opposition was disqualified due to the number of Iranian players deemed ineligible. Iran still played their scheduled game against Turkmenistan on 23 February 2017. However, the game was considered an exhibition game and its results had no bearing on the standings of the tournament. In 2018, the under-20 national team was supposed to make their debut at the 2018 IIHF World Junior Championship Division III Qualification tournament, but they withdrew before the tournament starting. The (senior) national team made its debut at the 2018 IIHF World Championship Division III qualification tournament in Sarajevo, Bosnia and Herzegovina. They won all of their games and earned a promotion to Division III for 2019. The national team finished third place in the 2019 IIHF World Championship Division III tournament in Sofia, Bulgaria.
