= Turkmenistan at the Asian Games =

- IOC code: TKM
- NOC: National Olympic Committee of Turkmenistan
- Medals Ranked 34th: Gold 3 Silver 11 Bronze 18 Total 32

Summer appearances
- 1994; 1998; 2002; 2006; 2010; 2014; 2018; 2022; 2026

Winter appearances
- 2017; 2025; 2029

Turkmenistan first competed at the Asian Games in 1994.

== Medals by games ==
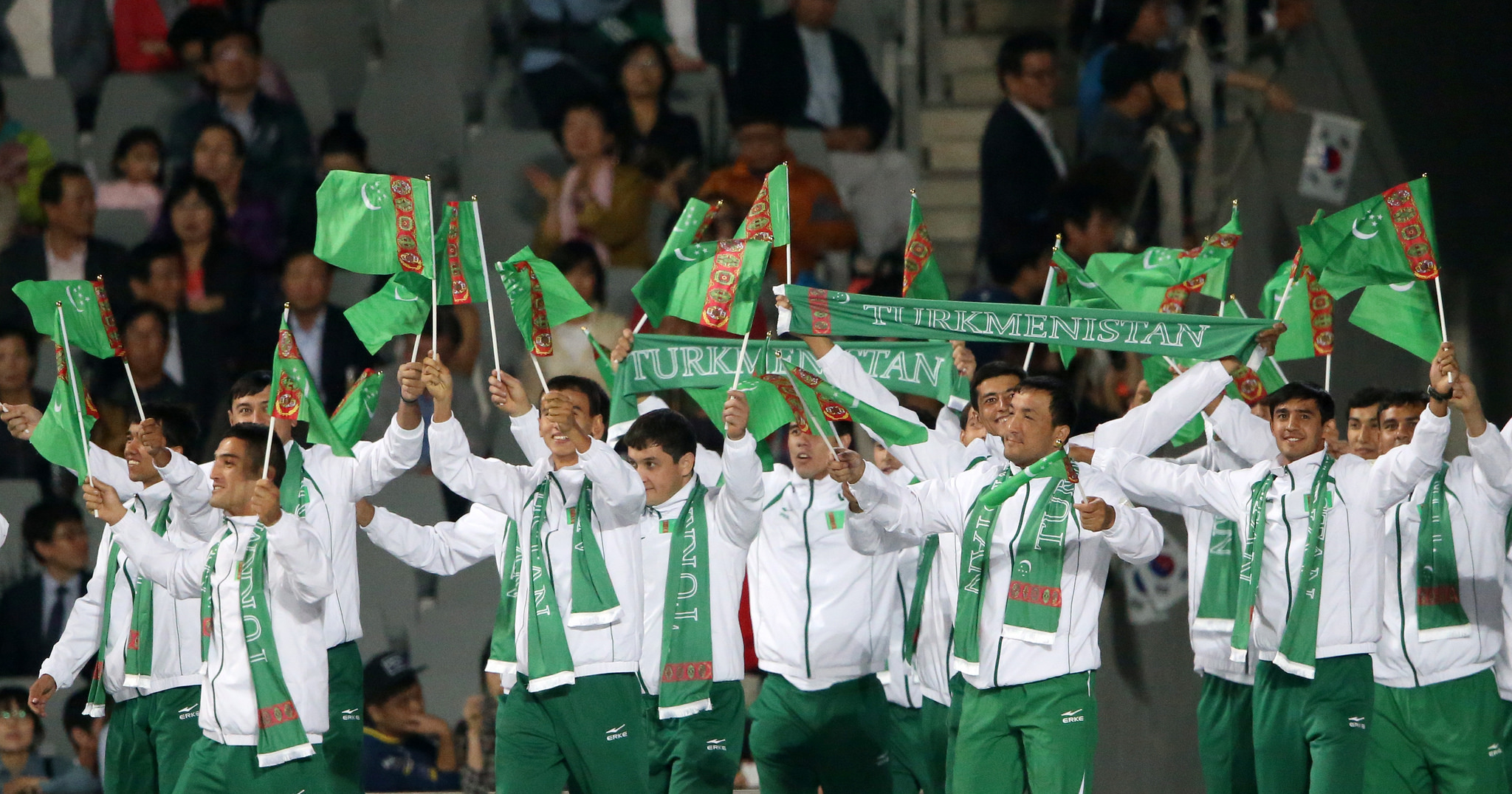
Turkmenistan team at the Asian Games 2014

=== Asian Games ===
Peach colour indicates best performance

Games	Gold	Silver	Bronze	Total	Rank
(Japan) 1994 Hiroshima	1	3	3	7	17
(Thailand) 1998 Bangkok	1	0	1	2	23
(South Korea) 2002 Busan	1	2	1	4	25
(Qatar) 2006 Doha	0	1	0	1	33
(China) 2010 Guangzhou	0	0	0	0	–
(South Korea) 2014 Incheon	0	1	5	6	32
(Indonesia) 2018 Jakarta	0	1	2	3	32
(China) 2022 Hangzhou	0	1	6	7	28
(Japan) 2026 Nagoya	0	2	0	2	31
(Qatar) 2030 Doha	Future event				
(Saudi Arabia) 2034 Riyadh	Future event				
Total	3	11	18	32	34

=== Asian Martial Arts Games ===
Games	Gold	Silver	Bronze	Total	Rank
(Thailand) 2009 Bangkok	1	1	2	4	21
Total	1	1	2	4	

=== Asian Indoor Games ===
Games	Gold	Silver	Bronze	Total	Rank
(Thailand) 2005 Bangkok	0	0	0	0	–
2007 Macau	0	0	0	0	–
(Vietnam) 2009 Hanoi	0	0	0	0	–
(South Korea) 2013 Incheon	2	4	1	7	11
(Turkmenistan) 2017 Ashgabat	74	67	85	226	1
Total	76	71	86	233	-

=== Asian Beach Games ===
Games	Gold	Silver	Bronze	Total	Rank
(Indonesia) 2008 Bali	Did not participate				
(Oman) 2010 Muscat	0	0	0	0	–
Total	0	0	0	0	

=== Asian Youth Games ===
Games	Gold	Silver	Bronze	Total	Rank
2009 Singapore	0	0	0	0	–
Total	0	0	0	0	

== Medals by sport ==
=== Asian Games ===
Sport	Gold	Silver	Bronze	Total
Athletics	0	0	1	1
Boxing	0	0	4	4
Judo	0	2	3	5
Ju-jitsu	0	0	1	1
Kurash	0	1	2	3
Rowing	0	3	1	4
Shooting	2	2	0	4
Weightlifting	1	1	0	2
Wrestling	0	0	2	2
Wushu	0	0	2	2
Total	3	9	16	28

=== Asian Martial Arts Games ===
Sport	Gold	Silver	Bronze	Total
Kickboxing	0	1	1	2
Kurash	1	0	0	1
Wushu	0	0	1	1
Total	1	1	2	4
