= 2018 World Ice Hockey Championships =

2018 World Ice Hockey Championships may refer to:

- 2018 Men's World Ice Hockey Championships
- 2018 IIHF World Championship
- 2018 World Junior Ice Hockey Championships
- 2018 IIHF World U18 Championships
