= HC Bagtyýarlyk =

Bagtyýarlyk Багтярлык
- City: Ashgabat
- League: Turkmenistan Championship 2013-present
- Founded: 2007
- Home arena: Winter Sports Complex Ashgabat (capacity: 10,000)
- Colours
- Head coach: (Turkmenistan) Suleyman Durdyyev
- Captain: (Turkmenistan) Ahmet Gurbanov

Franchise history
- 2007–2013: Burgut

Hockey Club Bagtyyarlyk (Russian: Багтыярлык, Turkmen: Bagtyýarlyk, English: Happiness), also known as Burgut, is a Turkmenian professional ice hockey team based in Ashgabat, Turkmenistan. Is the command of the State sport Committee of Turkmenistan. It was founded in 2007.

== History ==
The team was founded in 2007 and was named "Burgut" (Eagle). The head coach of the team was Turkmen Suleiman Durdyyev. They team played at the Ice Palace in Ashgabat. Several players from the team also played for the Turkmenistan national team. In 2012, the team won USD$20,000 at the first President of Turkmenistan Cup tournament. From April 20 to May 5, 2012 by order of the President of Turkmenistan, the team went to Kazan to attend the Ak Bars Kazan youth hockey school.

Since 2013 the team has been known as "Bagtyýarlyk". They play in the Turkmenistan Hockey Championship.
