= Turkmenistan Ice Hockey Federation =

Ice hockey governing body in Turkmenistan

Turkmenistan
- Association name: Turkmenistan Ice Hockey Federation
- IIHF Code: TKM
- Founded: 2012
- IIHF membership: 15 May 2015
- President: Jora Hudayberdiyev
- IIHF men's ranking: 48th

The Turkmenistan Ice Hockey Federation (Turkmen: Türkmenistanyň şaýbaly hokkeý federasiýasy, TŞHF) is the governing body of ice hockey in Turkmenistan.

== History ==
In 2014, at the IIHF congress in Minsk, Belarus, an official application was submitted for the entry of the National Hockey Center of Turkmenistan into the International Ice Hockey Federation (IIHF). On 15 May 2015, the application of Turkmenistan was approved, the National Winter Sports Center of Turkmenistan became the 74th member of the IIHF. Turkmenistan became the third former Soviet Republic from Central Asia to join the IIHF after Kazakhstan and Kyrgyzstan.

=== Presidents ===
- Begench Patyshakulievich Rejepov (1 March 2012–30 June 2015)
- Agajan Hudayberdiyev (30 June 2015–15 January 2017)
- Jora Hudayberdiyev (15 January 2017–present)

== Leagues ==
The Turkmenistan Ice Hockey Championship consisting of 8 teams is held annually. The first championship was held in 2014. Competitions are held in two rounds of 28 games each. The teams that took from the first to the fourth places in the championship will compete for the Turkmenistan Ice Hockey Cup.

=== Playing levels ===
- Turkmenistan Championship

== Ice hockey venues ==
In 2006, Bouygues completed the construction of the first Ice Palace in Turkmenistan. At the present moment, hockey teams from Ashgabat and the Turkmenistan national team hold games and trainings in the palace.

In 2011, a second ice facility, the Winter Sports Complex Ashgabat, was opened in Turkmenistan at a cost of 134.4 million euros. The total area of the new sports facility is 107 thousand square meters. In the center of the palace, there is an ice arena measuring 60 by 30 meters. One of the largest hockey arenas in the Commonwealth of Independent States.

== National teams ==
- Men's national team

=== Participation by year ===
2017

Turkmenistan did not enter in any 2017 IIHF World Championship tournaments.

Event	Host nation	Date	Result
Asian WG	Japan	18–26 February 2017	11th place (1st in Division II)

2018

Event	Division	Host nation	Date	Result
Men	Div. IIIQ	Bosnia and Herzegovina	25–28 February 2018	1st place (Promoted to 2019 Division III) (47th overall)
~~Men U20~~	~~Div. IIIQ~~	South Africa	5–7 February 2018	Withdrawn

Note: The Turkmenistan under-20 national team was supposed to make its debut at the 2018 IIHF World U20 Championship Division III Qualification tournament, but withdrew prior to the tournament starting.

2019

Event	Division	Host nation	Date	Result
Men	Div. III	Bulgaria	22–28 April 2019	3rd place (43rd overall)

2022

Event	Division	Host nation	Date	Result
Men	Div. IIIA	Luxembourg	3–8 April 2022	3rd place (39th overall)

2023

Event	Division	Host nation	Date	Result
Men	Div. IIIA	South Africa	17–23 April 2023	To be determined
