= Galkan HC =

Galkan Галкан
- City: Ashgabat
- League: Turkmenistan Championship 2013-present
- Founded: 2013
- Home arena: Galkan Winter Sports Centre (capacity: 630)
- Colours
- Head coach: (Turkmenistan) Aleksandr Vahovsky

Hockey Club Galkan (Turkmen: Galkan hokkeý topary, Russian: Хоккейный клуб Галкан; English: Shield), is a Turkmen professional ice hockey team based in Ashgabat, Turkmenistan. It is the team of the Ministry of Internal Affairs of Turkmenistan. The first Turkmenistan ice hockey champion (2013/2014), the first owner of the Hockey Cup of the Turkmenistan Ministry of the Interior (2013).
