= 2018 Men's Ice Hockey World Championships =

2018 edition of the Men's World Ice Hockey Championships

The 2018 Men's Ice Hockey World Championships was the 82nd such event hosted by the International Ice Hockey Federation. Teams participated at several levels of competition. The competition also served as qualifications for division placements in the 2019 competition.

== Championship (Top Division) ==
The tournament was held in Copenhagen and Herning, Denmark, from 4 to 20 May 2018.

Pos	Grp	Team	Pld	W	OTW	OTL	L	GF	GA	GD	Pts	Final result
1	A	Sweden	10	8	2	0	0	43	13	+30	28	Champions
2	A	Switzerland	10	5	1	2	2	33	26	+7	19	Runners-up
3	B	United States	10	6	2	0	2	46	25	+21	22	Third place
4	B	Canada	10	4	2	1	3	40	23	+17	17	Fourth place
5	B	Finland	8	5	0	1	2	40	14	+26	16	Eliminated in Quarter-finals
6	A	Russia	8	5	0	2	1	36	15	+21	17	Eliminated in Quarter-finals
7	A	Czech Republic	8	3	3	0	2	29	18	+11	15	Eliminated in Quarter-finals
8	B	Latvia	8	3	1	2	2	18	19	−1	13	Eliminated in Quarter-finals
9	A	Slovakia	7	3	0	2	2	19	20	−1	11	Eliminated in Group stage
10	B	Denmark (H)	7	3	1	0	3	13	17	−4	11	Eliminated in Group stage
11	B	Germany	7	1	1	2	3	16	20	−4	7	Eliminated in Group stage
12	A	France	7	2	0	0	5	13	29	−16	6	Eliminated in Group stage
13	B	Norway	7	1	1	1	4	13	31	−18	6	Eliminated in Group stage
14	A	Austria	7	1	0	1	5	13	30	−17	4	Eliminated in Group stage
15	A	Belarus	7	0	0	0	7	8	36	−28	0	2019 IIHF World Championship Division I
16	B	South Korea	7	0	0	0	7	4	48	−44	0	2019 IIHF World Championship Division I

Source: IIHF.com
Rules for classification: 1) position in the group; 2) number of points; 3) goal difference; 4) goals scored; 5) seeding before tournament.
(H) Host

== Division I ==
=== Group A ===
The Group A tournament was held in Budapest, Hungary, from 22 to 28 April 2018.

Pos	Team	Pld	W	OTW	OTL	L	GF	GA	GD	Pts	Qualification or relegation
1	Great Britain (P)	5	3	1	0	1	16	15	+1	11	2019 IIHF World Championship
2	Italy (P)	5	3	0	0	2	15	11	+4	9 (Note: Italy 3–0 Kazakhstan)	2019 IIHF World Championship
3	Kazakhstan	5	3	0	0	2	18	10	+8	9	
4	Hungary (H)	5	2	0	1	2	9	14	−5	7	
5	Slovenia	5	2	0	0	3	15	15	0	6	
6	Poland (R)	5	1	0	0	4	11	19	−8	3	Relegation to 2019 Division I B

Source: IIHF
Rules for classification: 1) points; 2) head-to-head points; 3) head-to-head goal difference; 4) head-to-head number of goals scored; 5) result against closest best-ranked team outside tied teams; 6) result against second-best ranked team outside tied teams; 7) seeding before tournament.
(H) Host; (P) Promoted; (R) Relegated

=== Group B ===
The Group B tournament was held in Kaunas, Lithuania, from 22 to 28 April 2018.

Pos	Team	Pld	W	OTW	OTL	L	GF	GA	GD	Pts	Qualification or relegation
1	Lithuania (H, P)	5	4	1	0	0	26	9	+17	14	Promoted to 2019 Division I A
2	Japan	5	2	2	0	1	17	13	+4	10 (Note: Estonia 1–2 Japan)	
3	Estonia	5	3	0	1	1	10	7	+3	10	
4	Ukraine	5	1	0	1	3	10	18	−8	4 (Note: Romania 0–3 Ukraine)	
5	Romania	5	1	0	1	3	12	18	−6	4	
6	Croatia (R)	5	1	0	0	4	11	21	−10	3	Relegation to 2019 Division II A

Source: IIHF
Rules for classification: 1) points; 2) head-to-head points; 3) head-to-head goal difference; 4) head-to-head number of goals scored; 5) result against closest best-ranked team outside tied teams; 6) result against second-best ranked team outside tied teams; 7) seeding before tournament.
(H) Host; (P) Promoted; (R) Relegated

== Division II ==
=== Group A ===
The Group A tournament was held in Tilburg, Netherlands, from 23 to 29 April 2018.

Pos	Team	Pld	W	OTW	OTL	L	GF	GA	GD	Pts	Qualification or relegation
1	Netherlands (H, P)	5	5	0	0	0	42	5	+37	15	Promoted to 2019 Division I B
2	Australia	5	3	1	0	1	19	14	+5	11	
3	Serbia	5	3	0	1	1	16	14	+2	10	
4	China	5	2	0	0	3	10	16	−6	6	
5	Belgium	5	1	0	0	4	11	28	−17	3	
6	Iceland (R)	5	0	0	0	5	7	28	−21	0	Relegation to 2019 Division II B

Source: IIHF
Rules for classification: 1) points; 2) head-to-head points; 3) head-to-head goal difference; 4) head-to-head number of goals scored; 5) result against closest best-ranked team outside tied teams; 6) result against second-best ranked team outside tied teams; 7) seeding before tournament.
(H) Host; (P) Promoted; (R) Relegated

=== Group B ===
The Group B tournament was held in Granada, Spain, from 14 to 20 April 2018.

Pos	Team	Pld	W	OTW	OTL	L	GF	GA	GD	Pts	Qualification or relegation
1	Spain (H, P)	5	5	0	0	0	49	6	+43	15	Promoted to Division II A
2	New Zealand	5	4	0	0	1	33	14	+19	12	
3	Israel	5	3	0	0	2	24	14	+10	9	
4	North Korea	5	1	0	0	4	12	40	−28	3 (Note: North Korea 3 Pts, +2 GD; Mexico 3 Pts, −1 GD, Luxembourg 3 Pts, −1 GD. Mexico defeated Luxembourg three to one.)	
5	Mexico	5	1	0	0	4	9	30	−21	3	
6	Luxembourg (R)	5	1	0	0	4	6	29	−23	3	Relegation to Division III

Source: IIHF
Rules for classification: 1) points; 2) head-to-head points; 3) head-to-head goal difference; 4) head-to-head number of goals scored; 5) result against closest best-ranked team outside tied teams; 6) result against second-best ranked team outside tied teams; 7) seeding before tournament.
(H) Host; (P) Promoted; (R) Relegated

== Division III ==
The tournament was held in Cape Town, South Africa, from 16 to 22 April 2018.

Pos	Team	Pld	W	OTW	OTL	L	GF	GA	GD	Pts	Qualification or relegation
1	Georgia (P)	5	4	0	0	1	35	12	+23	12	Promoted to 2019 Division II B
2	Bulgaria	5	3	1	0	1	28	10	+18	11	
3	Turkey	5	3	0	1	1	22	14	+8	10	
4	Chinese Taipei	5	2	0	0	3	16	25	−9	6 (Note: Chinese Taipei 5–2 South Africa)	
5	South Africa (H)	5	2	0	0	3	13	18	−5	6	
6	Hong Kong (R)	5	0	0	0	5	3	38	−35	0	Relegation to 2019 Division III qualification

Source: IIHF
Rules for classification: 1) points; 2) head-to-head points; 3) head-to-head goal difference; 4) head-to-head number of goals scored; 5) result against closest best-ranked team outside tied teams; 6) result against second-best ranked team outside tied teams; 7) seeding before tournament.
(H) Host; (P) Promoted; (R) Relegated

=== Division III qualification tournament ===
The qualification tournament was held in Sarajevo, Bosnia and Herzegovina, from 25 to 28 February 2018 after the original hosts, Abu Dhabi, United Arab Emirates, withdrew their application to host.

Pos	Team	Pld	W	OTW	OTL	L	GF	GA	GD	Pts	Qualification
1	Turkmenistan	3	3	0	0	0	41	5	+36	9	Promoted to 2019 Division III
2	Bosnia and Herzegovina (H)	3	2	0	0	1	17	15	+2	6	
3	United Arab Emirates	3	1	0	0	2	5	12	−7	3	
4	Kuwait	3	0	0	0	3	5	36	−31	0	

Source: IIHF
Rules for classification: 1) points; 2) head-to-head points; 3) head-to-head goal difference; 4) head-to-head number of goals scored; 5) result against closest best-ranked team outside tied teams; 6) result against second-best ranked team outside tied teams; 7) seeding before tournament.
(H) Host
