= Turkmenistan at the 2025 Asian Winter Games =

- Flag of Turkmenistan
- IOC code: TKM
- NOC: National Olympic Committee of Turkmenistan

in Harbin, China 7 February 2025 – 14 February 2025
- Competitors: 24 in 3 sports
- Flag bearer: Dovlet Hydyrov
- Medals: Gold 0 Silver 0 Bronze 0 Total 0

Asian Winter Games appearances
- 2017; 2025; 2029

Turkmenistan competed at the 2025 Asian Winter Games in Harbin, China, from February 7 to 14. The Turkmenistani team consisted of 24 athletes competing in three sports. Hockey player Dovlet Hydyrov was the country's opening ceremony flagbearer.

== Competitors ==
The following table lists the Turkmenistani delegation per sport and gender.

Sport	Men	Women	Total
Figure skating	0	2	2
Ice hockey	21	0	21
Short-track speed skating	1	0	1
Total	22	2	24

== Figure skating ==
Turkmenistan entered two figure skaters (both women). This will mark the country's Asian Winter Games debut in the sport.

Athlete(s)	Event	SP		FP		Total	
Athlete(s)	Event	Points	Rank	Points	Rank	Points	Rank
Ayna Ekayeva	Women's	16.97	25	Did not advance			
Larisa Vahitova	Women's	37.56	14 Q	74.68	13	112.24	13

== Ice hockey ==
=== Men's tournament ===
Turkmenistan qualified a men's hockey team.

Turkmenistan was represented by the following 21 athletes:

- Amangeldi Aganiyazov (D)
- Musa Annasaparov (D)
- Novruz Bayhanov (F)
- Dovrangeldi Bayjayev (F)
- Baymyrat Baymyradov (F)
- Keremli Charyyev (G)
- Begench Dovletmyradov (F)
- Serdar Durdyyev (F)
- Ovezguly Esenov (F)
- Arslan Geldimyradov (F)
- Ahmet Gurbanov (F)
- Tanryberdi Guvanjov (G)
- Dovlet Hydyrov (D)
- Erkin Kakabayev (D)
- Serdar Kakajanov (D)
- Maksat Kakayev (D)
- Allan Muhyyev (D)
- Arslan Nuryyev (F)
- Nazar Orazov (F)
- Gurbanmyrat Tannyyev (D)
- Aleksandr Vahovskiy

Legend: G = Goalie, D = Defense, F = Forward

Group stage

Pos	Team	Pld	W	OW	OL	L	GF	GA	GD	Pts	Qualification
1	Hong Kong	3	3	0	0	0	61	2	+59	9	Quarterfinals
2	Turkmenistan	3	2	0	0	1	46	6	+40	6	Placement 9–10
3	India	3	1	0	0	2	5	51	−46	3	Placement 11–12
4	Macau	3	0	0	0	3	3	56	−53	0	Placement 13–14

Source: OCA

5 February; 21:00	Turkmenistan	26–0 (6–0, 5–0, 15–0)	Macau	Harbin Sport University Stadium, Harbin; Attendance: 393

Game reference

Keremli Çaryýew
Taňryberdi Guwanjow
Goalies
Leung Manlong
Referee:
Li Ho Ching (HKG)

Baýjaýew (Taňňyýew, Gurbanow) – 00:28	1–0
Baýmyradow (Kakajanow, Aganyýazow) – 02:02	2–0
Nuryýew (Baýhanow, Baýmyradow) – 04:16	3–0
Gurbanow (Wahowskiý, Hydyrow) – 05:29	4–0
Annasaparow (Esenow, Döwletmyradow) – 08:35	5–0
Döwletmyradow (Geldimyradow, Kakabaýew) (SH) – 13:32	6–0
Kakajanow (Baýmyradow, Baýhanow) (PP) – 21:12	7–0
Durdyýew (Geldimyradow, Orazow) – 26:20	8–0
Baýmyradow (Baýhanow) – 33:01	9–0
Orazow (Durdyýew, Kakaýew) – 33:59	10–0
Baýmyradow (Nuryýew, Aganyýazow) – 35:45	11–0
Taňňyýew (Gurbanow, Baýjaýew) – 41:13	12–0
Geldimyradow – 43:09	13–0
Baýmyradow (Nuryýew, Aganyýazow) – 45:44	14–0
Baýhanow (Aganyýazow) – 46:03	15–0
Gurbanow (Wahowskiý, Taňňyýew) – 47:43	16–0
Döwletmyradow (Geldimyradow, Annasaparow) – 48:22	17–0
Aganyýazow (Baýhanow) (PP) – 52:11	18–0
Baýmyradow (Kakajanow, Baýhanow) – 52:49	19–0
Orazow – 53:38	20–0
Baýjaýew (Taňňyýew, Wahowskiý) – 54:14	21–0
Döwletmyradow – 54:53	22–0
Baýhanow (Baýmyradow, Kakajanow) – 55:32	23–0
Nuryýew (Baýhanow, Kakaýew) – 56:27	24–0
Aganyýazow (Baýmyradow, Baýjaýew) (SH) – 57:17	25–0
Döwletmyradow (Geldimyradow) – 58:55	26–0

12 min
Penalties
8 min
101
Shots
4

6 February; 20:30	India	1–19 (1–4, 0–6, 0–9)	Turkmenistan	Harbin Ice Hockey Arena, Harbin; Attendance: 1,108

Game reference

Lotus Chamba
Namgail Tundup
Goalies
Keremli Çaryýew
Taňryberdi Guwanjow
Referee:
Li Ho Ching (HKG)

S. Angchok (Lakdan, Kunzang) – 01:41	1–0
	1–1	01:54 – Geldimyradow (Döwletmyradow, Esenow)
	1–2	02:09 – Geldimyradow (Esenow, Döwletmyradow)
	1–3	08:02 – Kakabaýew (Döwletmyradow, Esenow)
	1–4	12:41 – Baýmyradow (Aganyýazow) (SH)
	1–5	28:05 – Baýmyradow (Nuryýew, Aganyýazow)
	1–6	32:00 – Nuryýew (Aganyýazow) (PP)
	1–7	34:16 – Orazow (Kakaýew, Durdyýew)
	1–8	34:51 – Nuryýew
	1–9	37:03 – Esenow (Annasaparow, Döwletmyradow) (PP)
	1–10	39:21 – Döwletmyradow (Kakabaýew) (SH)
	1–11	43:25 – Döwletmyradow (Geldimyradow, Kakabaýew)
	1–12	45:25 – Wahowskiý (Gurbanow, Taňňyýew) (PP)
	1–13	47:08 – Baýmyradow (Nuryýew)
	1–14	47:28 – Geldimyradow (Döwletmyradow)
	1–15	47:51 – Geldimyradow (Döwletmyradow)
	1–16	49:56 – Döwletmyradow (Geldimyradow) (PP)
	1–17	53:03 – Baýhanow (Nuryýew, Aganyýazow)
	1–18	53:32 – Wahowskiý (Baýjaýew)
	1–19	57:18 – Geldimyradow (Kakabaýew, Döwletmyradow)

22 min
Penalties
14 min
5
Shots
89

9 February; 9:00	Turkmenistan	1–5 (1–3, 0–2, 0–0)	Hong Kong	Harbin Ice Hockey Arena, Harbin; Attendance: 2,915

Game reference

Keremli Çaryýew
Goalies
Cheung Ching Ho
Referees:
Kang Tae-woo (KOR)
Liu Jiaqi (CHN)

	0–1	02:50 – Chan (Tong) (PP)
	0–2	07:13 – B. Tang (Chu, Cheng)
Wahowskiý (Baýjaýew, Hydyrow) (PP) – 11:56	1–2
	1–3	13:48 – B. Tang (Chu, Elmer) (PP)
	1–4	31:13 – Leung (Yam Ya.)
	1–5	38:48 – Chu (Elmer, Tong) (PP)

107 min
Penalties
28 min
29
Shots
25

At the conclusion of the men's ice hockey match between Hong Kong and Turkmenistan, Turkmenistani players attacked members of the Hong Kong team. The Sports Federation and Olympic Committee of Hong Kong, China, issued a statement "strongly condemning" the incident. Three Turkmenistani players Erkin Kakabayev, Arslan Geldimyradov, and Begench Dovletmyradov attacked several Hong Kong players, with the altercation lasting several minutes before referees were able to restore order. While none of the Hong Kong players sustained serious injuries, three were taken to the hospital as a precaution, including one who required stitches on his hand. The IIHF ultimately suspended four Turkmenistani players Kakabayev, Geldimyradov, Dovletmyradov, and Novruz Bayhanov from the remainder of the competition.

Ninth place game

10 February; 17:00	Kuwait	8–4 (3–2, 3–2, 2–0)	Turkmenistan	Harbin Sport University Stadium, Harbin; Attendance: 668

Game reference

Adam Barvík
Goalies
Keremli Çaryýew
Referees:
Anton Boryayev (KAZ)
Chae Young-jin (KOR)

	0–1	07:01 – Baýjaýew (Esenow, Kakabaýew)
Budzevich (Drozdetskikh) – 09:23	1–1
Vavra (PS) – 09:59	2–1
	2–2	12:29 – Baýjaýew (Esenow, Kakajanow)
Drozdetskikh (Budzevich, Tsibin) – 16:48	3–2
Tsibin (Drozdetskikh) – 28:29	4–2
Budzevich (Tsibin, Drozdetskikh) (PP) – 32:24	5–2
	5–3	34:31 – Wahowskiý (Gurbanow)
	5–4	35:59 – Gurbanow (Wahowskiý)
Budzevich (Al-Mari, Tsibin) – 39:05	6–4
Drozdetskikh (Budzevich) (SH) – 48:59	7–4
Al-Mari (Budzevich, Drozdetskikh) – 50:34	8–4

8 min
Penalties
8 min
37
Shots
34

== Short-track speed skating ==
Turkmenistan entered one male short-track speed skater. This marked the country's Asian Winter Games debut in the sport.

Men

Athlete	Event	Heat		Quarterfinal		Semifinal		Final	
Athlete	Event	Time	Rank	Time	Rank	Time	Rank	Time	Rank
Pena Atayev	500 m	52.461	4	Did not advance					32
Pena Atayev	1000 m	1:54.772	4	Did not advance					30
