= Turkmenistan at the 2017 Asian Winter Games =

- IOC code: TKM
- NOC: National Olympic Committee of Turkmenistan

in Sapporo and Obihiro February 19–26
- Competitors: 23 in 1 sport
- Medals: Gold 0 Silver 0 Bronze 0 Total 0

Asian Winter Games appearances
- 2017; 2025; 2029

Turkmenistan competed in the 2017 Asian Winter Games in Sapporo and Obihiro, Japan from February 19 to 26. This marked the country's debut at the Asian Winter Games. The country competed in one sport: ice hockey.

== Background ==
Turkmenistan originally had intended to make its debut at the 2007 Asian Winter Games in Changchun, China, however its athlete was not allowed to compete officially, as the country was not an official member of the International Skating Union at the time.

== Competitors ==
The following table lists the Turkmenistani delegation per sport and gender.

Sport	Men	Women	Total
Ice hockey	23	0	23
Total	23	0	23

== Ice hockey ==
Turkmenistan entered a men's hockey team, competing in division 2. This marked the country's debut in the sport at the Asian Winter Games. Before the tournament, the team had a training camp in Minsk, Belarus, and won both friendly games against local club teams. Turkmenistan finished in first place (11th place overall) in division 2 of the competition.

=== Men's tournament ===
Turkmenistan was represented by the following 23 athletes:

- Keremli Charyyev (G)
- Rahman Muratov (G)
- Amangeldi Aganiyazov (D)
- Shyhy Babayev (D)
- Kerim Bayramov (D)
- Evald Gayer (D)
- Dovlet Hydyrov (D)
- Dmitriy Savin (A) (D)
- Nikita Selifonkin (D)
- Ilyas Veliyev (A) (D)
- Ezizmuhammet Akmuhammedov (F)
- Maksat Atayev (F)
- Pavel Barkovskiy (F)
- Baymyrat Baymyradov (F)
- Azat Berdinyyazov (F)
- Yakut Berdiyev (F)
- Ahmet Gurbanov (C) (F)
- Meylis Kuliyev (F)
- Mammet Myrado (F)
- Nurmammet Nuryyev (F)
- Dovlet Soyunov (F)
- Aleksandr Vahovskiy (F)
- Ishan Veleyev (F)

Legend: G = Goalie, D = Defense, F = Forward, C = Captain, A = Assistant captain

Group B

Rank	Team	Pld	W	OW	OL	L	GF	GA	GD	Pts
1	Turkmenistan	3	3	0	0	0	37	4	+33	9
2	Macau	3	2	0	0	1	15	22	–7	6
3	Malaysia	3	1	0	0	2	19	20	–1	3
4	Indonesia	3	0	0	0	3	6	31	–25	0

18 February 2017; 13:00	Turkmenistan	9–2 (5–0, 4–1, 0–1)	Malaysia	Hoshioki Ice Skating Rink; Attendance: 113

Game reference
			Referee: (Sweden) Richard Magnusson; Linesmen: (Poland) Rafal Noworyta (Norway) Daniel Haugen
8 min	Penalties	4 min	Referee: (Sweden) Richard Magnusson; Linesmen: (Poland) Rafal Noworyta (Norway) Daniel Haugen
50	Shots	14	Referee: (Sweden) Richard Magnusson; Linesmen: (Poland) Rafal Noworyta (Norway) Daniel Haugen

21 February 2017; 9:30	Macau	0–16 (0–6, 0–4, 0–6)	Turkmenistan	Hoshioki Ice Skating Rink; Attendance: 155

Game reference
14 min	Penalties	6 min
8	Shots	66

24 February 2017; 13:00	Indonesia	2–12 (1–5, 0–5, 1–2)	Turkmenistan	Hoshioki Ice Skating Rink; Attendance: 102

Game reference
2 min	Penalties	8 min
11	Shots	71

11th place match

26 February 2017; 12:30	Kyrgyzstan	3–7 (2–2, 0–1, 1–4)	Turkmenistan	Hoshioki Ice Skating Rink; Attendance: 243

Game reference
46 min	Penalties	18 min
26	Shots	64
