= Galkan Winter Sports Centre =

Sport centre in Ashgabat, Turkmenistan

- Location: Ashgabat
- Capacity: 630

Construction
- Opened: 2014

Tenant
- Galkan HC

The Galkan Winter Sports Centre (Turkmen: Galkan gyşgy görnüşleri boýunça sport toplumy) is a hockey indoor arena in Ashgabat, Turkmenistan. It was built on the territory of the Institute of the Ministry of Internal Affairs of Turkmenistan in 2014 and holds 630 spectators. It was built by a Turkmen company, Aga Gurlyşyk.
