= Turkmenistan men's national ice hockey team =

Men's national ice hockey team representing Turkmenistan

Turkmenistan
- Association: Turkmenistan Ice Hockey Federation
- Head coach: Ahmed Gurbanov
- Assistants: Guwançmyrat Jepbarow
- Captain: Amangeldi Aganiyazov
- Most games: Dovlet Hydyrov; Alexander Vahovsky (42)
- Top scorer: Baymyrat Baymyradov (28)
- Most points: Alexander Vahovsky (53)
- Home stadium: Winter Sports Complex Ashgabat
- Team colors
- IIHF code: TKM

Ranking
- Current IIHF: 44 ▼1 (3 June 2026)
- Highest IIHF: 42 (2025)
- Lowest IIHF: 49 (2018)

First international
- Turkmenistan 9–2 Malaysia (Sapporo, Japan; 18 February 2017)

Biggest win
- Turkmenistan 26–0 Macau ( Harbin, China; 5 February 2025)

Biggest defeat
- Thailand 13–3 Turkmenistan (Bishkek, Kyrgyzstan; 14 March 2024)

IIHF World Championships
- Appearances: 7 (first in 2018)
- Best result: 39th (2022)

Asian Winter Games
- Appearances: 1 (first in 2017)
- Best result: 11th (2017)

International record (W–L–T)
- 23–18–0

The Turkmenistan national ice hockey team (Turkmen: Türkmenistanyň milli buz hokkeý ýygyndysy) is the national men's ice hockey team of Turkmenistan. The team is controlled by the Turkmenistan Ice Hockey Federation (Turkmen: Türkmenistanyň şaýbaly hokkeý federasiýasy; TŞHF) and a member of the International Ice Hockey Federation (IIHF). Turkmenistan made its debut in the 2018 World Championship Division III Qualification tournament. The team is currently ranked 42nd in the IIHF World Ranking and 12th in the Asian Ranking.

== History ==
The first national team formed in 2011 of four teams from Ashgabat: Oguzkhan, Alp Arslan, Shir and Burgut.

In 2013, Turkmenistan held its first (unofficial) match against Minsk City, which was won by a score of 7–2.

Turkmenistan participated at the 2017 Asian Winter Games. They won their first match in an official tournament by defeating Malaysia 9–2 and later went on to win their division by defeating Kyrgyzstan 7–3 in the gold medal game.

Turkmenistan made its World Championship debut in 2018, where it played in Division III Qualification tournament in Sarajevo, Bosnia and Herzegovina. They won all three games and earned promotion to Division III for 2019.

In April 2019, Turkmenistan making their debut in the 2019 IIHF World Championship Division III in Sofia (Bulgaria) and took third place among six teams in group, achieving a historic result.

During visit to Ashgabat Russian retired ice hockey player Sergei Nemchinov from 30 August to 7 September 2019 conducted intensive training with the Turkmenistan men's national ice hockey team. Then he entered the coaching staff of the national team of Turkmenistan and has already drawn up a plan for preparing Turkmen hockey players for the 2020 IIHF World Championship Division III Group A.

== Tournament record ==
=== World Championships ===
Year	Host	Result	Pld	W	OTW	OTL	L
1954 through 1991		As part of the Soviet Union					
1992 through 2017		Did not enter					
2018	(Bosnia and Herzegovina) Sarajevo	47th place (1st in Division IIIQ)	3	3	0	0	0
2019	(Bulgaria) Sofia	43rd place (3rd in Division III)	5	2	0	1	2
2020	(Luxembourg) Kockelscheuer	Cancelled due to the COVID-19 pandemic					
2021	(Luxembourg) Kockelscheuer	Cancelled due to the COVID-19 pandemic					
2022	(Luxembourg) Kockelscheuer	39th place (3rd in Division III A)	4	1	0	1	2
2023	(South Africa) Cape Town	42nd place (2nd in Division III A)	4	2	0	0	2
2024	(Kyrgyzstan) Bishkek	44th place (4th in Division III A)	5	2	0	0	3
2025	(Turkey) Istanbul	42nd place (2nd in Division III A)	5	3	1	0	1
2026	(South Africa) Cape Town	46th place (6th in Division III A)	5	0	0	1	4
Total		6/6	31	13	1	3	14

=== Asian Winter Games ===
Year	Host	Result	Pld	W	OW	OL	L	GF	GA	GD
2017	(Japan) Sapporo	11th place (1st in Division II)	4	4	0	0	0	44	7	+37
2025	(China) Harbin	10th place (2nd in Group C)	4	2	0	0	2	50	14	+36
Total			8	6	0	0	2	94	21	+73

== List of head coaches ==
- Rustam Kerimov 2013–2016
- Bayram Allayarov 2016–2024
- Ilýas Weliýew 2025–

== Team ==
=== Current roster ===
Roster for the Ice hockey at the 2025 Asian Winter Games – Men's tournament.

Head coach: Ylýas Weliýew

Turkmenistan National Ice Hockey Team Roster
No.	Position	Name	Notes
	Goaltender	Tanryberdy Guvandzhov	
	Goaltender	Keremli Charyev	
	Defenseman	Gurbanmyrat Tannyev	
	Defenseman	Maksat Kakayev	
	Defenseman	Dovlet Khydyrov	
	Defenseman	Amangeldy Aganyazov	
	Defenseman	Serdar Kakadzhanov	
	Defenseman	Erkin Kakabayev	
	Defenseman	Musa Annasaparov	
	Defenseman	Allan Mukhiyev	
	Forward	Serdar Durdyev	
	Forward	Baymyrat Baymyradov	
	Forward	Arslan Geldymyradov	
	Forward	Arslan Nuryyev	
	Forward	Kakageldy Ataev	
	Forward	Ahmet Gurbanov	Captain
	Forward	Dovrangeldy Baydzhayev	
	Forward	Ovezguly Esenov	
	Forward	Begench Dovletmuradov	
	Forward	Nowruz Baykhanov	
	Forward	Alexander Vakhovsky	
	Forward	Nazar Orazov	

== All-time record ==
Last match update: 10 February 2025

Key
Positive balance (more Wins)
Neutral balance (Wins = Losses)
Negative balance (more Losses)

Team	GP	W	T	L	GF	GA
Bosnia and Herzegovina	1	1	0	0	13	3
Bulgaria	1	0	0	1	2	6
Chinese Taipei	3	1	0	2	9	10
Hong Kong	1	0	0	1	1	5
India	1	1	0	0	19	1
Indonesia	1	1	0	0	12	2
Iran	1	1	0	0	12	2
Kuwait	2	1	0	1	28	10
Kyrgyzstan	3	2	0	1	17	14
Luxembourg	4	2	0	2	15	13
Macau	2	2	0	0	42	0
Malaysia	1	1	0	0	9	2
Mexico	1	1	0	0	8	4
South Africa	3	2	0	1	17	14
Thailand	2	1	0	1	9	16
Turkey	2	0	0	2	9	11
United Arab Emirates	2	1	0	1	8	10
Total	31	19	0	12	230	123

== See also ==
- Ice hockey in Turkmenistan
- Turkmenistan Championship
