= Turkmenistan Championship =

- Sport: Ice hockey
- Founded: 2013
- No. of teams: 8
- Country: Turkmenistan
- Most recent champion: Galkan HC
- Most titles: Galkan HC (7)

The Turkmenistan Championship is the national ice hockey championship in Turkmenistan. It involves 8 professional clubs of various ministries, departments and institutions of Turkmenistan. The tournament is held for 3 months in Ashgabat. Competitions are held in two rounds on 28 games each. The teams placing first through fourth place in the championship, will compete with each Cup of Turkmenistan. The first season of the tournament took place in the 2013/2014 year.

== Current teams ==
Team	City	Founded	Owner	Arena	Capacity
Alp Arslan HC	Ashgabat		Ministry of Industry and Communication of Turkmenistan	Winter Sports Complex Ashgabat	10,300
Galkan HC	Ashgabat	2013	Ministry of Internal Affairs of Turkmenistan	Galkan Winter Sports Centre	630
Galkan HC-2	Ashgabat	2019	Ministry of Internal Affairs of Turkmenistan	Galkan Winter Sports Centre	630
Nesil HC	Ashgabat		Institute of the Ministry of Internal Affairs of Turkmenistan	Galkan Winter Sports Centre	630
Shir HC	Ashgabat		Ministry of Trade and Foreign Economic Relations of Turkmenistan	Winter Sports Complex Ashgabat	10,300
Burgut HC	Ashgabat	2007	Sports School of the General Directorate of Sport and Youth Policy of the city of Ashgabat	Winter Sports Complex Ashgabat	10,300
Oguzkhan	Ashgabat		Türkmengaz	Winter Sports Complex Ashgabat	10,300
Vatanchy HC	Ashgabat		Ministry of Defense of Turkmenistan	Winter Sports Complex Ashgabat	10,300

=== Former participating teams ===
- Merdana (State Border Service of Turkmenistan)

== Champions ==
- 2024: Galkan HC
- 2020: Galkan HC
- 2019: Galkan HC
- 2018: Galkan HC
- 2017: Galkan HC
- 2016: Galkan HC
- 2015: Galkan HC
- 2014: Galkan HC
