= 2019 IIHF World Championship Division III =

International ice hockey tournament

Tournament details
- Host countries: Bulgaria; United Arab Emirates
- Venues: 2 (in 2 host cities)
- Dates: 22–28 April; 31 March–6 April
- Teams: 12

The 2019 IIHF World Championship Division III was an international ice hockey tournament run by the International Ice Hockey Federation.

The Group A tournament was held in Sofia, Bulgaria from 22 to 28 April and the qualification tournament in Abu Dhabi, United Arab Emirates from 31 March to 6 April 2019. Both Kyrgyzstan and Thailand made their debut in the World Championships, with each winning their first game (Kyrgyzstan won all five of its games, but the first four were changed to forfeits due to an ineligible player).

Bulgaria earned promotion to Division II, while the United Arab Emirates won the qualification tournament and were promoted. South Africa finished last and were demoted to the qualification tournament.

== Division III ==
2019 IIHF World Championship Division III

Tournament details
- Host country: Bulgaria
- Venue: 1 (in 1 host city)
- Dates: 22–28 April
- Teams: 6

Tournament statistics
- Games played: 15
- Goals scored: 137 (9.13 per game)
- Attendance: 6,650 (443 per game)
- Scoring leader: (Bulgaria) Miroslav Vasilev (16 points)

Official website
- Website

=== Participants ===
| Team | Qualification |
|---|---|
| Luxembourg | Placed 6th in Division II B and were relegated. |
| Bulgaria | Host, placed 2nd in Division III last year. |
| Turkey | Placed 3rd in Division III last year. |
| Chinese Taipei | Placed 4th in Division III last year. |
| South Africa | Placed 5th in Division III last year. |
| Turkmenistan | Placed 1st in Division III qualification last year. |

=== Match officials ===
4 referees and 7 linesmen were selected for the tournament.

| Referees | Linesmen |
|---|---|
| (China) Feng Lei; (United Kingdom) Stefan Hogarth; (Hungary) Vladimir Babic; (New Zealand) Ryan Cairns | (Bulgaria) Kiril Peychinov; (Bulgaria) Luchezar Stoyanov; (Finland) Henri Neva; (Kazakhstan) Anton Boryayev; (Latvia) Dāvis Zunde; (Romania) Mihai Paul; (South Korea) Chae Youn-jin |

=== Standings ===
| Pos | Team | Pld | W | OTW | OTL | L | GF | GA | GD | Pts | Qualification or relegation |
|---|---|---|---|---|---|---|---|---|---|---|---|
| 1 | Bulgaria (H, P) | 5 | 5 | 0 | 0 | 0 | 39 | 7 | +32 | 15 | Promotion to 2020 Division II B |
| 2 | Turkey | 5 | 3 | 0 | 0 | 2 | 21 | 17 | +4 | 9 | |
| 3 | Turkmenistan | 5 | 2 | 0 | 1 | 2 | 21 | 21 | 0 | 7 | |
| 4 | Luxembourg | 5 | 2 | 0 | 0 | 3 | 15 | 20 | −5 | 6 | |
| 5 | Chinese Taipei | 5 | 1 | 1 | 0 | 3 | 23 | 35 | −12 | 5 | |
| 6 | South Africa (R) | 5 | 1 | 0 | 0 | 4 | 18 | 37 | −19 | 3 | Relegation to 2020 Division III B |

Source: IIHF
Rules for classification: 1) points; 2) head-to-head points; 3) head-to-head goal difference; 4) head-to-head number of goals scored; 5) result against closest best-ranked team outside tied teams; 6) result against second-best ranked team outside tied teams; 7) seeding before tournament.
(H) Host; (P) Promoted; (R) Relegated

=== Results ===
All times are local (UTC+3).

| 22 April 2019; 13:00 | Turkey | 2–3 (0–1, 1–0, 1–2) | Luxembourg | Winter Sports Palace, Sofia; Attendance: 120 |

Game reference

Tolga Bozacı
Goalies
Marcus Anselm
Referee:
(New Zealand) Ryan Cairns
Linesmen:
(Bulgaria) Kiril Peychinov
(Bulgaria) Luchezar Stoyanov

| | 0–1 | 14:01 – Mosr (Mossong, Bechtold) (PP) |
| Bingöl (Kavaz, Ö. Karş) – 31:33 | 1–1 |
| | 1–2 | 46:56 – Backes (Eriksson, C. Cannon) |
| Elakaş (Halil, Gümüş) (PP) – 51:54 | 2–2 |
| | 2–3 | 57:39 – Mossong (Welter, Mosr) |

2 min
Penalties
2 min
36
Shots
28

| 22 April 2019; 16:30 | Turkmenistan | 4–5 OT (0–0, 0–3, 4–1) (OT: 0–1) | Chinese Taipei | Winter Sports Palace, Sofia; Attendance: 130 |

Game reference

Keremli Charyyev
Rahman Myradov
Goalies
Hou Ta-yu
Referee:
(Hungary) Vladimir Babic
Linesmen:
(Finland) Henri Neva
(Latvia) Dāvis Zunde

| | 0–1 | 25:45 – Weng (Shen, Yang) |
| | 0–2 | 26:32 – Weng (Lin H., Shen) |
| | 0–3 | 34:11 – Weng (Pan) |
| Dovletmyradov (Gurbanov, Vahovskiy) – 47:40 | 1–3 |
| Kuliyev (Baymyradov) – 49:05 | 2–3 |
| Hydyrov (Vahovskiy) (PP) – 52:02 | 3–3 |
| | 3–4 | 54:12 – Lin K. (Lin H.) (PP) |
| Geldimyradov (Soyunov) – 59:18 | 4–4 |
| | 4–5 | 62:00 – Weng (Lin H.) |

10 min
Penalties
10 min
36
Shots
22

| 22 April 2019; 20:00 | Bulgaria | 12–2 (7–1, 1–1, 4–0) | South Africa | Winter Sports Palace, Sofia; Attendance: 850 |

Game reference

Dimitar Dimitrov
Goalies
Charl Pretorius
Referee:
(United Kingdom) Stefan Hogarth
Linesmen:
(Kazakhstan) Anton Boryayev
(South Korea) Chae Youn-jin

| Muhachev (M. Vasilev) – 00:34 | 1–0 |
| Yotov (Hodulov, Stoilov) – 01:32 | 2–0 |
| | 2–1 | 04:50 – Samaai (Carelse) |
| M. Vasilev (Boyadjiev) – 12:43 | 3–1 |
| M. Vasilev (Yotov) (PP) – 14:26 | 4–1 |
| M. Vasilev (V. Dikov) – 15:46 | 5–1 |
| Yotov (Stoilov, Stefanov) – 16:42 | 6–1 |
| M. Vasilev (Boyadjiev) – 17:24 | 7–1 |
| | 7–2 | 29:28 – R. Venter (Kluyts) |
| M. Vasilev (Hodulov) – 39:42 | 8–2 |
| Hodulov (Yotov) – 41:39 | 9–2 |
| Hodulov (K. Dikov) – 47:03 | 10–2 |
| Dzhorov – 49:50 | 11–2 |
| Muhachev (V. Dikov, Gatchev) – 53:55 | 12–2 |

24 min
Penalties
12 min
32
Shots
25

| 23 April 2019; 13:00 | South Africa | 2–7 (0–2, 1–3, 1–2) | Turkmenistan | Winter Sports Palace, Sofia; Attendance: 136 |

Game reference

Charl Pretorius
Ryan Boyd
Goalies
Keremli Charyyev
Referee:
(China) Feng Lei
Linesmen:
(Kazakhstan) Anton Boryayev
(Bulgaria) Luchezar Stoyanov

| | 0–1 | 02:10 – Baymyradov (Tannyyev) |
| | 0–2 | 02:59 – Gurbanov (Dovletmyradov) |
| | 0–3 | 26:13 – Vahovskiy (Gurbanov, Dovletmyradov) |
| | 0–4 | 27:45 – Aganiyazov (Gurbanov, Dovletmyradov) (PP) |
| | 0–5 | 39:42 – Baymyradov (Tannyyev) |
| Marais (Samaai) – 39:53 | 1–5 |
| Giot (Obery) – 48:50 | 2–5 |
| | 2–6 | 57:56 – Baymyradov |
| | 2–7 | 59:39 – Vahovskiy (Soyunov) |

8 min
Penalties
2 min
32
Shots
30

| 23 April 2019; 16:30 | Luxembourg | 4–5 (0–0, 3–2, 1–3) | Chinese Taipei | Winter Sports Palace, Sofia; Attendance: 180 |

Game reference

Marcus Anselm
Goalies
Hou Ta-yu
He Wei-chih
Referee:
(New Zealand) Ryan Cairns
Linesmen:
(Finland) Henri Neva
(Bulgaria) Kiril Peychinov

| Mosr (Mossong, Welter) – 30:01 | 1–0 |
| | 1–1 | 31:21 – Lin H. (Weng, Shen) |
| | 1–2 | 34:52 – Weng (Yang, Wang) |
| Backes (C. Cannon, Scheier) – 35:31 | 2–2 |
| C. Cannon (Eriksson) – 38:28 | 3–2 |
| | 3–3 | 42:47 – Wang (Weng, Shen) (PP) |
| | 3–4 | 45:55 – Shen (Chen W.) |
| | 3–5 | 48:58 – Weng (Lin H.) (PP) |
| C. Cannon (Bechtold) (SH) – 57:01 | 4–5 |

8 min
Penalties
14 min
35
Shots
28

| 23 April 2019; 20:00 | Bulgaria | 3–1 (0–0, 3–0, 0–1) | Turkey | Winter Sports Palace, Sofia; Attendance: 1,200 |

Game reference

Dimitar Dimitrov
Goalies
Tolga Bozacı
Referee:
(United Kingdom) Stefan Hogarth
Linesmen:
(Romania) Mihai Paul
(Latvia) Dāvis Zunde

| M. Vasilev – 23:12 | 1–0 |
| V. Dikov – 26:36 | 2–0 |
| Gatchev (Yotov, Boyadjiev) – 37:40 | 3–0 |
| | 3–1 | 51:57 – Çıplak |

14 min
Penalties
6 min
31
Shots
34

| 25 April 2019; 13:00 | Luxembourg | 5–2 (1–1, 3–0, 1–1) | South Africa | Winter Sports Palace, Sofia; Attendance: 108 |

Game reference

Marcus Anselm
Goalies
Ryan Boyd
Charl Pretorius
Referee:
(China) Feng Lei
Linesmen:
(Bulgaria) Luchezar Stoyanov
(Latvia) Dāvis Zunde

| | 0–1 | 05:19 – Samaai (Carelse, Marais) |
| Backes (C. Cannon) – 11:50 | 1–1 |
| Welter (Bechtold, C. Cannon) (SH) – 22:46 | 2–1 |
| Welter (Mossong) – 35:31 | 3–1 |
| Backes (Eriksson) – 35:47 | 4–1 |
| | 4–2 | 57:17 – Marais |
| Grönlund (EN) – 57:29 | 5–2 |

4 min
Penalties
2 min
24
Shots
36

| 25 April 2019; 16:30 | Turkey | 7–4 (0–2, 3–2, 4–0) | Chinese Taipei | Winter Sports Palace, Sofia; Attendance: 128 |

Game reference

Muhammed Karagül
Tolga Bozacı
Goalies
Hou Ta-yu
Referee:
(United Kingdom) Stefan Hogarth
Linesmen:
(South Korea) Chae Youn-jin
(Bulgaria) Kiril Peychinov

| | 0–1 | 03:57 – Lin H. (Yang, Weng) |
| | 0–2 | 14:32 – Hsiao (Lin T.) |
| Bingöl (Aktürk, E. Faner) – 23:10 | 1–2 |
| | 1–3 | 26:39 – Yu (Lin H.) |
| Özmen (Hars) – 31:00 | 2–3 |
| Gümüş (K. Karş, Çıplak) (PP2) – 34:29 | 3–3 |
| | 3–4 | 39:59 – Weng (Shen, Lin H.) (PP) |
| Ö. Karş – 41:51 | 4–4 |
| Salt (Faner) (PP) – 47:10 | 5–4 |
| Çıplak (Gümüş) – 54:07 | 6–4 |
| K. Karş (Faner) – 58:52 | 7–4 |

8 min
Penalties
24 min
46
Shots
19

| 25 April 2019; 20:00 | Bulgaria | 6–2 (2–0, 2–2, 2–0) | Turkmenistan | Winter Sports Palace, Sofia; Attendance: 1,200 |

Game reference

Dimitar Dimitrov
Goalies
Keremli Charyyev
Referee:
(Hungary) Vladimir Babic
Linesmen:
(Finland) Henri Neva
(Romania) Mihai Paul

| Nikolov – 06:36 | 1–0 |
| K. Dikov (Nikolov) (PP) – 15:50 | 2–0 |
| | 2–1 | 21:36 – Barkovskiy (PP) |
| Muhachev (Boyadjiev, V. Dikov) (PP) – 30:32 | 3–1 |
| | 3–2 | 33:34 – Barkovskiy (Soyunov) |
| K. Dikov (M. Vasilev, Muhachev) (PP) – 36:58 | 4–2 |
| Hodulov (Boyadjiev, M. Vasilev) (PP2) – 43:38 | 5–2 |
| Boyadjiev (M. Vasilev, Muhachev) – 45:16 | 6–2 |

44 min
Penalties
46 min
39
Shots
20

| 26 April 2019; 13:00 | South Africa | 3–6 (2–1, 1–2, 0–3) | Turkey | Winter Sports Palace, Sofia; Attendance: 120 |

Game reference

Charl Pretorius
Goalies
Tolga Bozacı
Referee:
(Hungary) Vladimir Babic
Linesmen:
(Romania) Mihai Paul
(Bulgaria) Kiril Peychinov

| Valadas – 03:28 | 1–0 |
| | 1–1 | 10:37 – K. Karş (Gümüş) (PP) |
| Kluyts (Van Doesburgh) – 12:42 | 2–1 |
| | 2–2 | 22:17 – Gümüş (Salt) (PP) |
| Giot (Botha, Magmoed) (PP) – 30:16 | 3–2 |
| | 3–3 | 38:45 – Halil (F. Faner) |
| | 3–4 | 43:42 – Özmen (Halil) (PP) |
| | 3–5 | 58:47 – Bakal (Salt, Halil) (EN) |
| | 3–6 | 59:09 – Özmen (EN) |

22 min
Penalties
8 min
17
Shots
47

| 26 April 2019; 16:30 | Turkmenistan | 4–3 (0–2, 3–1, 1–0) | Luxembourg | Winter Sports Palace, Sofia; Attendance: 195 |

Game reference

Keremli Charyyev
Goalies
Marcus Anselm
Referee:
(China) Feng Lei
Linesmen:
(Kazakhstan) Anton Boryayev
(Finland) Henri Neva

| | 0–1 | 02:54 – Mossong (Mosr, Welter) |
| | 0–2 | 08:51 – C. Cannon (Eriksson) |
| Barkovskiy (Soyunov, Geldimyradov) (PP) – 29:12 | 1–2 |
| Aganiyazov (PP) – 31:17 | 2–2 |
| | 2–3 | 33:48 – Mossong (Mosr) |
| Veleyev (Barkovskiy) – 39:01 | 3–3 |
| Dovletmyradov (Gurbanov) – 45:44 | 4–3 |

6 min
Penalties
10 min
38
Shots
26

| 26 April 2019; 20:00 | Chinese Taipei | 2–11 (1–1, 1–6, 0–4) | Bulgaria | Winter Sports Palace, Sofia; Attendance: 953 |

Game reference

Hou Ta-yu
He Wei-chih
Goalies
Dimitar Dimitrov
Referee:
(New Zealand) Ryan Cairns
Linesmen:
(South Korea) Chae Youn-jin
(Latvia) Dāvis Zunde

| Lin T. (Hsiao) – 12:22 | 1–0 |
| | 1–1 | 17:09 – M. Vasilev (Muhachev) |
| | 1–2 | 21:35 – M. Vasilev (Hodulov) |
| | 1–3 | 23:38 – Boyadjiev (M. Vasilev, V. Dikov) |
| | 1–4 | 26:33 – Hodulov |
| | 1–5 | 30:07 – T. Georgiev (V. Vasilev) |
| Lin H. (Shen, Weng) – 32:39 | 2–5 |
| | 2–6 | 35:13 – Hodulov (Boyadjiev) (PP) |
| | 2–7 | 35:33 – Dilkov (Dzhorov, T. Georgiev) |
| | 2–8 | 48:52 – M. Vasilev (V. Vasilev) (PP) |
| | 2–9 | 57:22 – Hodulov (Stoilov, Nikolov) |
| | 2–10 | 57:44 – Muhachev (M. Vasilev, Dzhorov) |
| | 2–11 | 59:58 – M. Vasilev (Bachvarov, Hodulov) (PP) |

10 min
Penalties
10 min
35
Shots
40

| 28 April 2019; 13:00 | Turkey | 5–4 (0–1, 2–1, 3–2) | Turkmenistan | Winter Sports Palace, Sofia; Attendance: 90 |

Game reference

Tolga Bozacı
Goalies
Keremli Charyyev
Referee:
(New Zealand) Ryan Cairns
Linesmen:
(South Korea) Chae Youn-jin
(Latvia) Dāvis Zunde

| | 0–1 | 08:48 – Dovletmyradov (Vahovskiy, Veleyev) |
| Ö. Karş (Gümüş, Halil) – 24:17 | 1–1 |
| | 1–2 | 26:53 – Dovletmyradov (Gurbanov, Vahovskiy) (PP) |
| F. Faner (Halil) – 27:06 | 2–2 |
| Bakal (Salt, Halil) – 40:53 | 3–2 |
| | 3–3 | 42:09 – Vahovskiy (Veleyev) |
| | 3–4 | 45:52 – Barkovskiy (Geldimyradov) |
| Özmen (Gümüş) (PP2) – 54:14 | 4–4 |
| Bingöl (Ö. Karş, E. Faner) – 56:03 | 5–4 |

10 min
Penalties
14 min
38
Shots
22

| 28 April 2019; 16:30 | Chinese Taipei | 7–9 (1–2, 2–4, 4–3) | South Africa | Winter Sports Palace, Sofia; Attendance: 105 |

Game reference

Hou Ta-yu
He Wei-chih
Goalies
Charl Pretorius
Referee:
(China) Feng Lei
Linesmen:
(Romania) Mihai Paul
(Bulgaria) Luchezar Stoyanov

| Lin H. (Weng, Sang) (PP2) – 09:13 | 1–0 |
| | 1–1 | 11:51 – Carelse (Samaai) |
| | 1–2 | 18:03 – Carelse (Obery, Samaai) |
| | 1–3 | 22:39 – Schuurman |
| | 1–4 | 24:03 – Compton |
| | 1–5 | 25:54 – Botha (Samaai, Carelse) (PP) |
| | 1–6 | 27:46 – Compton |
| Shen (Lin H.) (PP) – 32:01 | 2–6 |
| Lin H. (Weng) – 34:06 | 3–6 |
| | 3–7 | 41:51 – Schuurman (Compton) |
| Sang (Weng, Shen) (SH) – 46:48 | 4–7 |
| | 4–8 | 47:42 – Samaai (PP) |
| Chen W. (Chen K.) – 48:23 | 5–8 |
| Chen W. – 54:47 | 6–8 |
| Chiang (Weng) – 56:11 | 7–8 |
| | 7–9 | 59:43 – Marais (EN) |

8 min
Penalties
10 min
34
Shots
22

| 28 April 2019; 20:00 | Luxembourg | 0–7 (0–4, 0–1, 0–2) | Bulgaria | Winter Sports Palace, Sofia; Attendance: 1,135 |

Game reference

Marcus Anselm
Sven Cruchten
Goalies
Dimitar Dimitrov
Referee:
(United Kingdom) Stefan Hogarth
Linesmen:
(Kazakhstan) Anton Boryayev
(Finland) Henri Neva

| 0–1 | 12:28 – Hodulov (V. Vasilev) |
| 0–2 | 14:50 – Hodulov (Yotov) |
| 0–3 | 16:13 – Georgiev (SH) |
| 0–4 | 18:18 – Muhachev (V. Dikov, Dilkov) |
| 0–5 | 32:18 – Hodulov (Yotov, Boyadjiev) |
| 0–6 | 44:35 – Yotov (Gatchev, Stoilov) |
| 0–7 | 59:59 – Hodulov (Dilkov) (PP2) |

28 min
Penalties
14 min
26
Shots
29

=== Awards and statistics ===
==== Awards ====
- Best players selected by the directorate:
  - Best Goalkeeper: (Bulgaria) Dimitar Dimitrov
  - Best Defenseman: (Chinese Taipei) Shen Yen-lin
  - Best Forward: (Bulgaria) Miroslav Vasilev

Source: IIHF.com

==== Scoring leaders ====
List shows the top skaters sorted by points, then goals.

| Player | GP | G | A | Pts | +/− | PIM | POS |
|---|---|---|---|---|---|---|---|
| (Bulgaria) Miroslav Vasilev | 5 | 10 | 6 | 16 | +10 | 22 | F |
| (Chinese Taipei) Weng To | 5 | 7 | 8 | 15 | +3 | 2 | F |
| (Bulgaria) Ivan Hodulov | 5 | 10 | 4 | 14 | +10 | 18 | F |
| (Chinese Taipei) Lin Hung-ju | 5 | 5 | 7 | 12 | −2 | 12 | F |
| (Bulgaria) Martin Boyadjiev | 5 | 2 | 7 | 9 | +8 | 6 | D |
| (Chinese Taipei) Shen Yen-lin | 5 | 2 | 7 | 9 | +1 | 0 | D |
| (Bulgaria) Stanislav Muhachev | 5 | 5 | 3 | 8 | +10 | 0 | F |
| (Bulgaria) Alexei Yotov | 5 | 3 | 5 | 8 | +7 | 0 | F |
| (Turkmenistan) Begench Dovletmyradov | 5 | 4 | 3 | 7 | +2 | 2 | F |
| (Luxembourg) Colm Cannon | 5 | 3 | 4 | 7 | +2 | 4 | F |
| (South Africa) Uthman Samaai | 5 | 3 | 4 | 7 | +1 | 6 | F |
| (Turkmenistan) Aleksandr Vahovskiy | 5 | 3 | 4 | 7 | 0 | 6 | F |

GP = Games played; G = Goals; A = Assists; Pts = Points; +/− = Plus/minus; PIM = Penalties in minutes; POS = Position
Source: IIHF.com

==== Goaltending leaders ====
Only the top five goaltenders, based on save percentage, who have played at least 40% of their team's minutes, are included in this list.

| Player | TOI | GA | GAA | SA | Sv% | SO |
|---|---|---|---|---|---|---|
| (Bulgaria) Dimitar Dimitrov | 300:00 | 7 | 1.40 | 138 | 94.93 | 1 |
| (Luxembourg) Marcus Anselm | 292:18 | 19 | 3.90 | 160 | 88.12 | 0 |
| (Turkmenistan) Keremli Charyyev | 266:32 | 18 | 4.05 | 147 | 87.76 | 0 |
| (Turkey) Tolga Bozacı | 272:26 | 14 | 3.08 | 114 | 87.72 | 0 |
| (Chinese Taipei) Hou Ta-yu | 224:52 | 22 | 5.87 | 134 | 83.58 | 0 |

TOI = Time on ice (minutes:seconds); SA = Shots against; GA = Goals against; GAA = Goals against average; Sv% = Save percentage; SO = Shutouts
Source: IIHF.com

== Division III qualification tournament ==
2019 IIHF World Championship Division III qualification tournament

Tournament details
- Host country: United Arab Emirates
- Venue: 1 (in 1 host city)
- Dates: 31 March–6 April
- Teams: 6

Tournament statistics
- Games played: 15
- Goals scored: 170 (11.33 per game)
- Attendance: 1,585 (106 per game)
- Scoring leader: (United Arab Emirates) Artur Zainutdinov (18 points)

Official website
- Website

=== Participants ===
| Team | Qualification |
|---|---|
| Hong Kong | Placed 6th in Division III last year and were relegated. |
| Bosnia and Herzegovina | Placed 2nd in Division III qualification last year. |
| United Arab Emirates | Host, placed 3rd in Division III qualification last year. |
| Kuwait | Placed 4th in Division III qualification last year. |
| Thailand | First time participating in tournament. |
| Kyrgyzstan | First time participating in tournament. |

=== Match officials ===
4 referees and 7 linesmen were selected for the tournament.

| Referees | Linesmen |
|---|---|
| (Australia) Kent Unwin; (China) Liu Jiaqi; (United Kingdom) Dean Smith; (South Korea) Toh Sung-taek | (Czech Republic) Jiří Gebauer; (Hungary) Norbert Muzsik; (South Korea) Kang Tae-woo; (Turkey) Murat Aygün; (Ukraine) Oleksiy Ryabikov; (United Arab Emirates) Heylaan Al-Ameri; (United Arab Emirates) Yahya Al-Jneibi |

=== Standings ===
| Pos | Team | Pld | W | OTW | OTL | L | GF | GA | GD | Pts | Qualification or relegation |
|---|---|---|---|---|---|---|---|---|---|---|---|
| 1 | United Arab Emirates (H, P) | 5 | 4 | 0 | 0 | 1 | 46 | 14 | +32 | 12 (Note: United Arab Emirates 11–1 Hong Kong) | Promotion to 2020 Division III A |
| 2 | Hong Kong | 5 | 4 | 0 | 0 | 1 | 31 | 18 | +13 | 12 | |
| 3 | Thailand | 5 | 2 | 1 | 0 | 2 | 26 | 19 | +7 | 8 | |
| 4 | Bosnia and Herzegovina | 5 | 2 | 0 | 1 | 2 | 21 | 22 | −1 | 7 | |
| 5 | Kuwait | 5 | 1 | 0 | 0 | 4 | 9 | 43 | −34 | 3 (Note: Kyrgyzstan 0–5 (forfeit) Kuwait) | Later assigned to 2020 Division IV |
| 6 | Kyrgyzstan | 5 | 1 | 0 | 0 | 4 | 7 | 24 | −17 | 3 | Later assigned to 2020 Division IV |

Source: IIHF
Rules for classification: 1) points; 2) head-to-head points; 3) head-to-head goal difference; 4) head-to-head number of goals scored; 5) result against closest best-ranked team outside tied teams; 6) result against second-best ranked team outside tied teams; 7) seeding before tournament.
(H) Host; (P) Promoted

=== Results ===
All times are local (UTC+4).

- Kyrgyzstan played its first four games, all wins, with Russian born player Aleksandr Titov in their lineup. Before their final game, also a win, when it was found that Titov was not yet eligible to play for Kyrgyzstan, he was disqualified from the tournament and Kyrgyzstan forfeited their first four games.

| 31 March 2019; 12:00 | Bosnia and Herzegovina | 4–5 GWS (4–1, 0–1, 0–2) (OT: 0–0) (SO: 0–1) | Thailand | Abu Dhabi Ice Rink, Abu Dhabi; Attendance: 47 |

Game reference

Amel Ćapin
Goalies
Pattarapol Ungkulpattanasuk
Referee:
(China) Liu Jiaqi
Linesmen:
(United Arab Emirates) Yahya Al-Jneibi
(Czech Republic) Jiří Gebauer

| Hodžić – 00:53 | 1–0 |
| Ćatović (Omer) (PP) – 08:48 | 2–0 |
| Pilav (Ćatović, Mrkva) (PP) – 13:46 | 3–0 |
| Omer (Dzamalija) – 15:36 | 4–0 |
| | 4–1 | 18:23 – Nagayama (PP) |
| | 4–2 | 22:16 – Thanakroekkiat (Nagayama) |
| | 4–3 | 42:09 – Ingkharratphithakon (Vattanapanyakul, Nagayama) |
| | 4–4 | 49:39 – Limpinphet (Suwachirat, Luckanatinakorn) |

Omer (miss)
Ćatović
Hodžić (miss)
Dzamalija
Mrkva (miss)
Shootout
(miss) Thanakroekkiat
Nagayama
(miss) Suwachirat
Kitayama
Khuhakaew
12 min
Penalties
16 min
29
Shots
53

| 31 March 2019; 16:00 | Kyrgyzstan | 0–5 (~~14–0~~ forfeit) (9–0, 2–0, 3–0) | Kuwait | Abu Dhabi Ice Rink, Abu Dhabi; Attendance: 52 |

Game reference

Aleksandr Petrov
Goalies
Jasem Al-Sarraf
Referee:
(United Kingdom) Dean Smith
Linesmen:
(United Arab Emirates) Heylaan Al-Ameri
(South Korea) Kang Tae-woo

| Titov (Abdyraev) – 04:29 | 1–0 |
| Chuvalov – 05:26 | 2–0 |
| Abdyraev (Kudashev) (PP) – 06:19 | 3–0 |
| Chuvalov (Terentyev) – 08:08 | 4–0 |
| Titov (Kolodii) – 08:51 | 5–0 |
| Egorov (Nosov) – 12:01 | 6–0 |
| Terentyev (Nosov, Egorov) (PP2) – 14:08 | 7–0 |
| Titov (Kolodii) (PP) – 14:39 | 8–0 |
| Tonkikh (Titov) (SH) – 18:40 | 9–0 |
| Terentyev (Tonkikh, Chuvalov) – 33:45 | 10–0 |
| Tonkikh (Chuvalov, Nosov) – 38:17 | 11–0 |
| Nosov (Tonkikh, Chuvalov) – 44:47 | 12–0 |
| Kudashev (Titov, Abdyraev) – 54:18 | 13–0 |
| Isamatov (Tynaliev) – 59:56 | 14–0 |

6 min
Penalties
14 min
60
Shots
5

| 31 March 2019; 20:00 | United Arab Emirates | 11–1 (5–0, 6–0, 0–1) | Hong Kong | Abu Dhabi Ice Rink, Abu Dhabi; Attendance: 168 |

Game reference

Khaled Al-Suwaidi
Goalies
Emerson Keung
Cheung Ching Ho
Referee:
(South Korea) Toh Sung-taek
Linesmen:
(Turkey) Murat Aygün
(Hungary) Norbert Muzsik

| Karkotsky (Remess) – 08:31 | 1–0 |
| Zainutdinov (Karkotsky) – 13:10 | 2–0 |
| Remess (J. Al-Dhareri) – 16:46 | 3–0 |
| Zainutdinov – 18:48 | 4–0 |
| Al-Mahrooqi (Zainutdinov) – 19:19 | 5–0 |
| Zainutdinov – 21:14 | 6–0 |
| Al-Mehairi (O. Al-Shamsi) – 22:36 | 7–0 |
| J. Al-Dhareri (Zainutdinov) – 27:14 | 8–0 |
| J. Al-Dhareri (Zainutdinov) – 36:21 | 9–0 |
| Zainutdinov (Al-Kaabi) – 37:46 | 10–0 |
| Zainutdinov (J. Al-Dhareri, Al-Mahrooqi) – 39:37 | 11–0 |
| | 11–1 | 51:52 – Wong K. (Tang) |

4 min
Penalties
4 min
41
Shots
16

| 1 April 2019; 12:00 | Hong Kong | 12–2 (4–1, 2–0, 6–1) | Kuwait | Abu Dhabi Ice Rink, Abu Dhabi; Attendance: 68 |

Game reference

Cheung Ching-ho
Goalies
Ahmad Al-Saegh
Referee:
(Australia) Kent Unwin
Linesmen:
(United Arab Emirates) Yahya Al-Jneibi
(Ukraine) Oleksiy Ryabikov

| | 0–1 | 03:32 – A. Al-Sarraf (Al-Qattan) |
| Lau (Lo, Au-Yeung) – 06:07 | 1–1 |
| Sham (Wong K., To) – 07:25 | 2–1 |
| Au-Yeung (Tang, Wong K.) (PP) – 10:33 | 3–1 |
| Wong K. (Sham, To) – 14:16 | 4–1 |
| Tang – 30:00 | 5–1 |
| Kan S. (SH) | 6–1 |
| Chau (L. Wong, Sham) – 43:05 | 7–1 |
| Lo – 44:27 | 8–1 |
| J. Wong (Fung) – 46:03 | 9–1 |
| J. Wong (Kan C.) – 46:20 | 10–1 |
| Chau (Tang) – 49:16 | 11–1 |
| Chau (Lam, Kan C.) – 53:30 | 12–1 |
| | 12–2 | 58:53 – Al-Awadhi (Al-Zidan, Al-Maraghy) (PP) |

12 min
Penalties
10 min
33
Shots
17

| 1 April 2019; 16:00 | Thailand | 5–0 (~~2–6~~ forfeit) (0–4, 0–0, 2–2) | Kyrgyzstan | Abu Dhabi Ice Rink, Abu Dhabi; Attendance: 82 |

Game reference

Pattarapol Ungkulpattanasuk
Goalies
Aleksandr Petrov
Referee:
(China) Liu Jiaqi
Linesmen:
(United Arab Emirates) Heylaan Al-Ameri
(Turkey) Murat Aygün

| | 0–1 | 11:33 – Tynaliev (Gorobets) |
| | 0–2 | 12:00 – Tonkikh (Nosov) |
| | 0–3 | 16:36 – Titov (Abdyraev, Kolodii) |
| | 0–4 | 18:55 – Chuvalov (Nosov, Tonkikh) |
| Luckanatinakorn – 42:40 | 1–4 |
| Thanakroekkiat (Luckanatinakorn) (PP) – 44:13 | 2–4 |
| | 2–5 | 49:02 – Nosov (Tonkikh) |
| | 2–6 | 18:55 – Egorov (Chuvalov) |

8 min
Penalties
49 min
8
Shots
48

| 1 April 2019; 20:00 | Bosnia and Herzegovina | 3–10 (0–3, 1–6, 2–2) | United Arab Emirates | Abu Dhabi Ice Rink, Abu Dhabi; Attendance: 74 |

Game reference

Amel Ćapin
Dino Pašović
Goalies
Khaled Al-Suwaidi
Referee:
(United Kingdom) Dean Smith
Linesmen:
(Czech Republic) Jiří Gebauer
(South Korea) Kang Tae-woo

| | 0–1 | 07:22 – J. Al-Dhaheri (Remess) (PP) |
| | 0–2 | 12:26 – Savko (O. Al-Shamsi) |
| | 0–3 | 17:36 – J. Al-Dhaheri (Zainutdinov, Karkotsky) (PP) |
| | 0–4 | 22:13 – Zainutdinov (J. Al-Dhaheri) (PP) |
| | 0–5 | 26:10 – Karkotsky |
| | 0–6 | 28:01 – Al-Mahrooqi (Remess) |
| Hasović – 30:55 | 1–6 |
| | 1–7 | 32:27 – Zainutdinov (Remess) (SH) |
| | 1–8 | 33:22 – Al-Mahrooqi (J. Al-Dhaheri, Zainutdinov) |
| | 1–9 | 39:15 – A. Al-Suwaidi (O. Al-Shamsi) |
| Dzamalija (Đinalić, Omer) – 48:12 | 2–9 |
| | 2–10 | 49:20 – Zainutdinov (J. Al-Dhaheri, Al-Mahrooqi) |
| Mrkva (Omer) – 57:50 | 3–10 |

12 min
Penalties
10 min
17
Shots
50

| 3 April 2019; 12:00 | Bosnia and Herzegovina | 5–0 (~~3–14~~ forfeit) (0–4, 2–7, 1–3) | Kyrgyzstan | Abu Dhabi Ice Rink, Abu Dhabi; Attendance: 66 |

Game reference

Dino Pašović
Amel Ćapin
Goalies
Aleksandr Petrov
Referee:
(Australia) Kent Unwin
Linesmen:
(United Arab Emirates) Heylaan Al-Ameri
(Hungary) Norbert Muzsik

| | 0–1 | 04:38 – Nosov (SH) |
| | 0–2 | 04:58 – Egorov (Nosov) (SH) |
| | 0–3 | 05:51 – Tonkikh (Isamatov) |
| | 0–4 | 10:34 – Nosov (Tonkikh, Egorov) |
| | 0–5 | 20:53 – Tonkikh (Chuvalov, Kolodii) (PP) |
| Omer (Ćatović) (PP) – 22:22 | 1–5 |
| | 1–6 | 23:16 – Nosov (Egorov) |
| | 1–7 | 23:35 – Tynaliev (Abdyraev) (PP) |
| | 1–8 | 27:08 – Tonkikh (Nosov, Chuvalov) |
| | 1–9 | 27:59 – Nosov (Chuvalov, Terentyev) (PP) |
| | 1–10 | 31:02 – Kolodii (Shushenkov, Nosov) (PP2) |
| | 1–11 | 33:15 – Shushenkov (SH) |
| London (Hodžić, Hasović) (PP) – 33:59 | 2–11 |
| | 2–12 | 40:45 – Tagaev (Abdyraev, Titov) |
| | 2–13 | 48:44 – Nosov (Tonkikh, Egorov) (PP2) |
| Omer (Hodžić) (PP) – 55:51 | 3–13 |
| | 3–14 | 58:53 – Chuvalov |

107 min
Penalties
41 min
12
Shots
55

| 3 April 2019; 16:00 | Hong Kong | 6–5 (0–3, 3–2, 3–0) | Thailand | Abu Dhabi Ice Rink, Abu Dhabi; Attendance: 56 |

Game reference

Keung Emerson
Goalies
Pattarapol Ungkulpattanasuk
Referee:
(South Korea) Toh Sung-taek
Linesmen:
(South Korea) Kang Tae-woo
(Ukraine) Oleksiy Ryabikov

| | 0–1 | 06:51 – Nagayama (Suwachirat) |
| | 0–2 | 15:52 – Suwachirat (Supadilokluk, Forster) |
| | 0–3 | 16:20 – Kitayama (Supadilokluk) |
| | 0–4 | 20:52 – Suwachirat (Forster, Nagayama) |
| Kan S. (Wong K.) – 27:22 | 1–4 |
| | 1–5 | 31:13 – Limpinphet (Kitayama, Nagayama) |
| Tang (Lo) – 35:11 | 2–5 |
| To (Tang) – 36:42 | 3–5 |
| To (Tang) – 54:33 | 4–5 |
| Sham – 57:23 | 5–5 |
| Wong K. (Kan S., L. Wong) (PP) – 59:20 | 6–5 |

12 min
Penalties
16 min
34
Shots
26

| 3 April 2019; 20:00 | United Arab Emirates | 13–1 (5–0, 8–0, 0–1) | Kuwait | Abu Dhabi Ice Rink, Abu Dhabi; Attendance: 98 |

Game reference

Ahmed Al-Dhaheri
Goalies
Jasem Al-Saraf
Ahmad Al-Saegh
Referee:
(China) Liu Jiaqi
Linesmen:
(Turkey) Murat Aygün
(Czech Republic) Jiří Gebauer

| J. Al-Dhareri (Al-Mehairi) – 01:25 | 1–0 |
| Al-Kaabi (Al-Nuaimi, Al-Mehairi) – 02:40 | 2–0 |
| Al-Nuaimi (Al-Kaabi) – 12:19 | 3–0 |
| Al-Mahrooqi (Al-Ameri, Al-Mazrouei) – 18:24 | 4–0 |
| Al-Kaabi (Al-Mazrouei, Al-Nuaimi) – 19:52 | 5–0 |
| J. Al-Dhareri (Al-Mehairi, Al-Mahrooqi) – 21:45 | 6–0 |
| Al-Zaabi (J. Al-Dhareri, Al-Ameri) – 25:12 | 7–0 |
| Al-Blooshi – 30:17 | 8–0 |
| Al-Kaabi (Al-Mazrouei, M. Al-Shamsi) – 30:44 | 9–0 |
| Al-Mehairi (Al-Nuaimi) – 31:59 | 10–0 |
| O. Al-Shamsi – 32:23 | 11–0 |
| Al-Kaabi (Al-Blooshi) (SH) – 36:59 | 12–0 |
| Al-Mahrooqi (PP) – 39:53 | 13–0 |
| | 13–1 | 57:10 – Al-Ajmi |

6 min
Penalties
16 min
27
Shots
9

| 4 April 2019; 12:00 | Kyrgyzstan | 0–5 (~~8–3~~ forfeit) (3–0, 1–3, 4–0) | Hong Kong | Abu Dhabi Ice Rink, Abu Dhabi; Attendance: 44 |

Game reference

Temir Muktarbek
Goalies
Cheung Ching Ho
Referee:
(United Kingdom) Dean Smith
Linesmen:
(South Korea) Kang Tae-woo
(Hungary) Norbert Muzsik

| Tonkikh (Nosov) (PP) – 05:18 | 1–0 |
| Nosov (Chuvalov) – 12:36 | 2–0 |
| Abdyraev (Ulugbek) – 18:24 | 3–0 |
| Nosov (SH) – 20:43 | 4–0 |
| | 4–1 | 27:16 – Lo (Kan S.) |
| | 4–2 | 32:32 – Yeung (Sham, Wong K.) (PP) |
| | 4–3 | 33:24 – Chau (Wong K., Au-Yeung) (PP) |
| Chuvalov – 43:32 | 5–3 |
| Titov (Abdyraev, Shushenkov) (PP) – 49:42 | 6–3 |
| Kolodii (Chuvalov, Nosov) – 51:23 | 7–3 |
| Chuvalov (Nosov) (SH) – 55:37 | 8–3 |

43 min
Penalties
12 min
37
Shots
14

| 4 April 2019; 16:00 | Kuwait | 0–9 (0–2, 0–3, 0–4) | Bosnia and Herzegovina | Abu Dhabi Ice Rink, Abu Dhabi; Attendance: 52 |

Game reference

Jasem Al-Sarraf
Goalies
Amel Ćapin
Dino Pašović
Referee:
(South Korea) Toh Sung-taek
Linesmen:
(United Arab Emirates) Yahya Al-Jneibi
(Turkey) Murat Aygün

| 0–1 | 03:51 – Ćatović (Omer, Hodžić) |
| 0–2 | 10:40 – Ismailović (Omer, Hodžić) |
| 0–3 | 28:17 – Mrkva (Omer, Ćatović) |
| 0–4 | 28:31 – Ćatović (Omer, London) |
| 0–5 | 31:13 – Hodžić (PP) |
| 0–6 | 45:05 – Omer |
| 0–7 | 47:51 – Hasović (Hodžić) |
| 0–8 | 57:02 – Mušić |
| 0–9 | 59:28 – Mušić (Posavec, Omer) |

6 min
Penalties
14 min
18
Shots
35

| 4 April 2019; 20:00 | Thailand | 2–8 (1–4, 1–3, 0–1) | United Arab Emirates | Abu Dhabi Ice Rink, Abu Dhabi; Attendance: 123 |

Game reference

Pattarapol Ungkulpattanasuk
Goalies
Khaled Al-Suwaidi
Referee:
(Australia) Kent Unwin
Linesmen:
(Czech Republic) Jiří Gebauer
(Ukraine) Oleksiy Ryabikov

| Limpinphet (Luckanatinakorn) – 08:09 | 1–0 |
| | 1–1 | 08:55 – Zainutdinov (J. Al-Dhareri) |
| | 1–2 | 11:04 – Zainutdinov (J. Al-Dhareri) (PP) |
| | 1–3 | 14:15 – Zainutdinov (O. Al-Shamsi) |
| | 1–4 | 18:02 – Al-Kaabi (Karkotsky, Al-Mazrouei) |
| | 1–5 | 24:44 – Remess (Al-Nuaimi, Al-Mazrouei) (PP2) |
| | 1–6 | 32:32 – Karkotsky (Savko) |
| Kitayama (Luckanatinakorn, Nagayama) (SH) – 34:39 | 2–6 |
| | 2–7 | 37:34– Karkotsky (SH) |
| | 2–8 | 57:54 – Al-Mazrouei (M. Al-Shamsi, Al-Nuaimi) (PP) |

53 min
Penalties
42 min
23
Shots
33

| 6 April 2019; 12:00 | Kuwait | 1–9 (0–0, 1–4, 0–5) | Thailand | Abu Dhabi Ice Rink, Abu Dhabi; Attendance: 47 |

Game reference

Jasem Al-Sarraf
Goalies
Sujin Charoensuk
Referee:
(Australia) Kent Unwin
Linesmen:
(United Arab Emirates) Heylaan Al-Ameri
(South Korea) Kang Tae-woo

| | 0–1 | 24:11 – Suwachirat (Kitayama) |
| | 0–2 | 27:09 – Supadilokluk (Thanakroekkiat) (PP) |
| | 0–3 | 28:37 – Vattanapanyakul (Sukwiboon, Forster) |
| Al-Ajmi – 33:35 | 1–3 |
| | 1–4 | 38:42 – Luckanatinakorn (Thanakroekkiat, Nagayama) |
| | 1–5 | 43:42 – Thanakroekkiat (Tengsakul) (PP) |
| | 1–6 | 44:13 – Nagayama (Thanakroekkiat, Limpinphet) |
| | 1–7 | 46:53 – Limpinphet (Thanakroekkiat, Forster) (PP) |
| | 1–8 | 54:03 – Limpinphet (Nagayama, Suwachirat) (SH) |
| | 1–9 | 55:25 – Luckanatinakorn (Sigel) |

32 min
Penalties
14 min
11
Shots
50

| 6 April 2019; 16:00 | Hong Kong | 7–0 (3–0, 1–0, 3–0) | Bosnia and Herzegovina | Abu Dhabi Ice Rink, Abu Dhabi; Attendance: 39 |

Game reference

Emerson Keung
Goalies
Amel Ćapin
Referee:
(South Korea) Toh Sung-taek
Linesmen:
(United Arab Emirates) Yahya Al-Jneibi
(Czech Republic) Jiří Gebauer

| Lo (Lam) (SH) – 12:28 | 1–0 |
| Sham (Au-Yeung, Kan S.) – 15:28 | 2–0 |
| Kan S. (Tang, Wong K.) (PP) – 19:14 | 3–0 |
| Kan S. – 38:23 | 4–0 |
| Lo (Au-Yeung, Kan S.) – 51:53 | 5–0 |
| Tang (Sham, Wong K.) – 53:21 | 6–0 |
| Chau – 54:05 | 7–0 |

8 min
Penalties
4 min
26
Shots
13

| 6 April 2019; 20:00 | United Arab Emirates | 4–7 (2–3, 1–0, 1–4) | Kyrgyzstan | Abu Dhabi Ice Rink, Abu Dhabi; Attendance: 580 |

Game reference

Khaled Al-Suwaidi
Goalies
Aleksandr Petrov
Referee:
(United Kingdom) Dean Smith
Linesmen:
(Hungary) Norbert Muzsik
(Ukraine) Oleksiy Ryabikov

| | 0–1 | 03:11 – Egorov (PP) |
| Al-Kaabi – 09:06 | 1–1 |
| | 1–2 | 10:20 – Kolodii (Tonkikh, Abdyraev) |
| Zainutdinov (Al-Mahrooqi) – 14:28 | 2–2 |
| | 2–3 | 19:16 – Egorov (Nosov) (PP) |
| Al-Mahrooqi (Karkotsky) (PP) – 29:44 | 3–3 |
| Zainutdinov – 40:22 | 4–3 |
| | 4–4 | 48:14 – Egorov (Chuvalov) |
| | 4–5 | 49:54 – Tonkikh (Gorobets, Abdyraev) |
| | 4–6 | 50:39 – Nosov (Tonkikh) |
| | 4–7 | 55:01 – Nosov |

42 min
Penalties
10 min
14
Shots
36

=== Statistics ===
All statistics from Kyrgyzstan's first four games were not counted by the IIHF, including their opponents scoring and goaltending details.

==== Scoring leaders ====
List shows the top skaters sorted by points, then goals.

| Player | GP | G | A | Pts | +/− | PIM | POS |
|---|---|---|---|---|---|---|---|
| (United Arab Emirates) Artur Zainutdinov | 5 | 13 | 5 | 18 | +13 | 4 | F |
| (United Arab Emirates) Juma Al-Dhaheri | 5 | 6 | 8 | 14 | +18 | 2 | F |
| (United Arab Emirates) Khalifa Al-Mahrooqi | 5 | 6 | 4 | 12 | +16 | 10 | F |
| (Thailand) Hideki Nagayama | 4 | 3 | 7 | 10 | +5 | 2 | D |
| (Bosnia and Herzegovina) Mirza Omer | 4 | 2 | 8 | 10 | +6 | 8 | F |
| (Hong Kong) Tang Shin Ming Jasper | 4 | 3 | 6 | 9 | +5 | 4 | F |
| (United Arab Emirates) Mohamed Al-Kaabi | 5 | 6 | 2 | 8 | +4 | 38 | F |
| (United Arab Emirates) Artyom Karkotsky | 5 | 4 | 4 | 8 | +2 | 16 | F |
| (Hong Kong) Wong Ka-ho | 4 | 3 | 5 | 8 | –2 | 2 | D |
| (Hong Kong) Kan Siu-him | 4 | 4 | 3 | 7 | +3 | 2 | F |

GP = Games played; G = Goals; A = Assists; Pts = Points; +/− = Plus/minus; PIM = Penalties in minutes; POS = Position
Source: IIHF.com

- Kyrgyz players Vladimir Nosov (23 points), Vladimir Tonkikh (16), Mikhail Chuvalov (16), Islambek Abdyraev (10) and Maksim Egorov (10) do not appear in this list because their statistics from their first four games were deemed invalid.

==== Goaltending leaders ====
Only the top five goaltenders, based on save percentage, who have played at least 40% of their team's minutes, are included in this list.

| Player | TOI | GA | GAA | SA | Sv% | SO |
|---|---|---|---|---|---|---|
| (United Arab Emirates) Khaled Al-Suwaidi | 240:00 | 13 | 3.25 | 92 | 85.87 | 0 |
| (Bosnia and Herzegovina) Amel Ćapin | 201:45 | 20 | 5.95 | 126 | 84.13 | 0 |
| (Hong Kong) Keung Emerson | 140:00 | 10 | 4.29 | 54 | 81.48 | 1 |
| (Hong Kong) Cheung Ching-ho | 100:00 | 8 | 4.80 | 43 | 81.40 | 0 |
| (Thailand) Pattarapol Ungkulpattanasuk | 184:36 | 18 | 5.85 | 96 | 81.25 | 0 |

TOI = Time on ice (minutes:seconds); SA = Shots against; GA = Goals against; GAA = Goals against average; Sv% = Save percentage; SO = Shutouts
Source: IIHF.com
