= 2019 in ice sports =

== Bandy ==
- October 11–14, 2018: 2018 Bandy World Cup in (Sweden) Sandviken
  - In the final, (Sweden) Villa Lidköping BK defeated (Sweden) Sandvikens AIK, 4–1, to win their 1st title.
- October 26–28, 2018: 2018 Bandy World Cup Women in (Sweden) Kungälv
  - In the final, (Russia) Record Irkutsk defeated (Sweden) Västerås SK, 4–2, to win their 4th title.
- November 2–4, 2018: 2018 Bandy World Cup Women's U17 in (Sweden) Vetlanda
  - In the final, (Sweden) Villa Lidköping BK defeated (Sweden) Skirö AIK, 4–1.
- November 2–4, 2018: Mini World Cup in (Sweden) Bollnäs
  - Winners: (Sweden) IK Sirius
- November 22–24, 2018: Veteran World Cup in (Finland) Lappeenranta
  - Winners: (Russia) Yenisey Krasnoyarsk BC, 2nd place: Team FIB, 3rd place: (Russia) Murman Murmansk
- January 25–27: 2019 Bandy World Championship Y-19 in Krasnoyarsk
  - In the final, Russia defeated Sweden, 2–1, to win their 9th Bandy World Championship Y-19 title. Finland took third place and Norway took fourth place.
- January 26 – February 2: 2019 Bandy World Championship in Vänersborg
  - Division A: In the final, Russia defeated Sweden, 6–5 in overtime, to win their second consecutive and 12th overall Bandy World Championship title.
  - Finland took third place.
    - Netherlands was relegated to Division B.
  - Division B: In the final, Estonia defeated Great Britain, with the score of 9–3.
  - Hungary took third place.
    - Estonia was promoted to Division A.
- February 28 – March 2: Bandy World Championship G-17 in Varkaus
  - Sweden defeated Russia, 2–1, to win their fifth consecutive Bandy World Championship G-17 title.
  - Finland took third place.
- March 11–17: Youth Bandy World Championship in Arkhangelsk
  - Russia defeated Sweden, 4–1, to win their eighth Youth Bandy World Championship (Y17) title.
  - Finland took third place.

== Bobsleigh & Skeleton ==
=== IBSF International events ===
- January 11 – 13: IBSF European Championships 2019 (Bobsleigh only) in Schönau am Königsee
  - Two-man bobsleigh winners: Germany (Francesco Friedrich & Martin Grothkopp)
  - Four-man bobsleigh winners: Germany (Johannes Lochner, Marc Rademacher, Christian Rasp, & Florian Bauer)
  - Two-women bobsleigh winners: Germany (Mariama Jamanka & Annika Drazek)
- January 12: IBSF Junior European Championships 2019 (Four-man Bobsleigh only) in (Austria) Innsbruck
  - Junior Four-man bobsleigh winners: Romania (Cristian Tentea Mihai, Andrei Alexandru Bugheanu, Nicolae Daroczi Ciprian, & Raul Constantin Dobre)
- January 18: IBSF European Championships 2019 (Skeleton only) in (Austria) Innsbruck
  - Skeleton winners: (Latvia) Martins Dukurs (m) / (Austria) Janine Flock (f)
- January 25 & 26: IBSF Junior European Championships 2019 in Sigulda
  - Junior Two-man bobsleigh winners: Latvia (Ralfs Berzins & Davis Springis)
  - Junior Two-women bobsleigh winners: Russia (Alena Osipenko & Aleksandra Iokst)
  - Junior Skeleton winners: (Russia) Evgeniy Rukosuev (m) / (Russia) Yulia Kanakina (f)
- February 2 & 3: IBSF Junior World Championships 2019 in Schönau am Königsee
  - Junior Two-man bobsleigh winners: Germany (Richard Oelsner & Issam Ammour)
  - Junior Four-man bobsleigh winners: Germany (Richard Oelsner, Costa Laurenz, Issam Ammour, & Eric Strauss)
  - Junior Two-women bobsleigh winners: Austria (Katrin Beierl & Jennifer Jantina Oluumi Desire Onasanya)
  - Junior Skeleton winners: (Germany) Felix Keisinger (m) / (Czech Republic) Anna Fernstaedtová (f)
- February 15: 2019 IBSF Para Bobsleigh European Championships in (Switzerland) St. Moritz
  - Winner: (Switzerland) Christopher Stewart
- February 25 – March 10: IBSF World Championships 2019 in (Canada) Whistler
  - Two-man bobsleigh winners: Germany (Francesco Friedrich & Thorsten Margis)
  - Four-man bobsleigh winners: Latvia (Oskars Ķibermanis, Arvis Vilkaste, Jānis Strenga, & Matīss Miknis)
  - Two-women bobsleigh winners: Germany (Mariama Jamanka & Annika Drazek)
  - Skeleton winners: (Latvia) Martins Dukurs (m) / (Germany) Tina Hermann (f)
  - Team Competition winners: Germany (Christopher Grotheer, Anna Köhler, Marc Rademacher, Johannes Lochner, Sophia Griebel, & Lisa Sophie Gericke)
- March 30 & 31: 2019 IBSF Para Bobsleigh World Championship in (United States) Lake Placid
  - Para Bobsleigh winner: (Canada) Lonnie Bissonnette (2 times)

=== 2018–19 Bobsleigh World Cup & 2018–19 Skeleton World Cup ===
- December 7 – 9, 2018: B&SWC #1 in (Latvia) Sigulda
  - Two-man bobsleigh #1 winners: Germany (Francesco Friedrich & Alexander Schueller)
  - Two-man bobsleigh #2 winners: Germany (Francesco Friedrich & Martin Grothkopp)
  - Two-women bobsleigh winners: Germany (Mariama Jamanka & Annika Drazek)
  - Skeleton winners: (Russia) Nikita Tregubov (m) / (Russia) Elena Nikitina (f)
- December 14 – 16, 2018: B&SWC #2 in Winterberg
  - Four-man bobsleigh #1 winners: Germany (Nico Walther, Paul Krenz, Alexander Rödiger, & Eric Franke)
  - Four-man bobsleigh #2 winners: Germany (Francesco Friedrich, Thorsten Margis, Candy Bauer, & Martin Grothkopp)
  - Two-women bobsleigh winners: Germany (Stephanie Schneider & Ann-Christin Strack)
  - Skeleton winners: (Russia) Aleksandr Tretyakov (m) / (Germany) Jacqueline Lölling (f)
- January 4 – 6: B&SWC #3 in Altenberg
  - Two-man bobsleigh winners: Germany (Francesco Friedrich & Thorsten Margis)
  - Four-man bobsleigh winners: Germany (Francesco Friedrich, Martin Grothkopp, Thorsten Margis, & Candy Bauer)
  - Two-women bobsleigh winners: Germany (Mariama Jamanka & Annika Drazek)
  - Skeleton winners: (Russia) Aleksandr Tretyakov (m) / (Russia) Elena Nikitina (f)
- January 11 – 13: B&SWC #4 in Schönau am Königsee
  - Two-man bobsleigh winners: Germany (Francesco Friedrich & Martin Grothkopp)
  - Four-man bobsleigh winners: Germany (Johannes Lochner, Christian Rasp, Marc Rademacher, & Florian Bauer)
  - Two-women bobsleigh winners: Germany (Mariama Jamanka & Annika Drazek)
- January 18 – 20: B&SWC #5 in (Austria) Innsbruck
  - Two-man bobsleigh winners: Germany (Francesco Friedrich & Thorsten Margis)
  - Four-man bobsleigh winners: Germany (Francesco Friedrich, Martin Grothkopp, Thorsten Margis, & Alexander Schueller)
  - Two-women bobsleigh winners: Germany (Stephanie Schneider & Ann-Christin Strack)
  - Skeleton winners: (Latvia) Martins Dukurs (m) / (Austria) Janine Flock (f)
- January 25 – 27: B&SWC #6 in (Switzerland) St. Moritz
  - Two-man bobsleigh winners: Germany (Francesco Friedrich & Alexander Schueller)
  - Four-man bobsleigh winners: Germany (Francesco Friedrich, Alexander Schueller, Candy Bauer, & Martin Grothkopp)
  - Two-women bobsleigh winners: United States (Elana Meyers & Lauren Gibbs)
  - Skeleton winners: (South Korea) Yun Sung-bin (m) / (Canada) Mirela Rahneva (f)
- February 15 & 16: B&SWC #7 in Lake Placid
  - Two-man bobsleigh winners: Germany (Francesco Friedrich & Thorsten Margis)
  - Four-man bobsleigh winners: Canada (Justin Kripps, Benjamin Coakwell, Ryan Sommer, & Cameron Stones)
  - Two-women bobsleigh winners: United States (Elana Meyers & Lake Kwaza)
  - Skeleton winners: (Russia) Aleksandr Tretyakov (m) / (Russia) Elena Nikitina and (Germany) Jacqueline Lölling (f; tie)
- February 22 – 24: B&SWC #8 (final) in (Canada) Calgary
  - Two-man bobsleigh winners: Germany (Francesco Friedrich & Thorsten Margis)
  - Four-man bobsleigh winners: Germany (Francesco Friedrich, Martin Grothkopp, Candy Bauer, & Thorsten Margis)
  - Two-women bobsleigh winners: Germany (Mariama Jamanka & Annika Drazek)
  - Men's Skeleton winners: (Russia) Aleksandr Tretyakov (#1) / (South Korea) Yun Sung-bin (#2)
  - Women's Skeleton winners: (Canada) Mirela Rahneva (#1) / (Germany) Tina Hermann (#2)

=== 2018–19 IBSF Europe Cup ===
- November 16 & 17, 2018: IEC #1 in (Austria) Innsbruck #1
  - Men's Skeleton winner: (Germany) Fabian Kuechler (2 times)
  - Women's Skeleton winner: (United Kingdom) Madelaine Smith (2 times)
- November 24, 2018: IEC #2 in (Germany) Winterberg #1
  - Skeleton winners: (Germany) Fabian Kuechler (m) / (United Kingdom) Kimberley Murray (f)
- December 6 – 8, 2018: IEC #3 in Altenberg #1
  - Two-man bobsleigh #1 winners: France (Romain Heinrich & Dorian Hauterville)
  - Two-man bobsleigh #2 winners: Germany (Johannes Lochner & Florian Bauer)
  - Four-man bobsleigh winners: Canada (Justin Kripps, Cameron Stones, Ryan Sommer, & Benjamin Coakwell)
  - Two-women bobsleigh winners: Canada (Christine de Bruin & Kristen Bujnowski)
- December 6 & 7, 2018: IEC #4 in (Germany) Schönau am Königsee #1
  - Men's Skeleton winners: (Germany) Fabian Kuechler (#1) / (China) YAN Wengang (#2)
  - Women's Skeleton winners: (Germany) Hannah Neise (#1) / (Germany) Janine Becker (#2)
- December 12 – 16, 2018: IEC #5 in Schönau am Königsee #2
  - Two-man bobsleigh #1 winners: Canada (Justin Kripps & Cameron Stones)
  - Two-man bobsleigh #2 winners: Canada (Justin Kripps & Benjamin Coakwell)
  - Four-man bobsleigh #1 winners: Canada (Nicholas Poloniato, Ryan Sommer, Cameron Stones, & Benjamin Coakwell)
  - Four-man bobsleigh #2 winners: Germany (Christoph Hafer, Christian Hammers, David Golling, & Tobias Schneider)
  - Two-women bobsleigh #1 winners: Germany (Christin Senkel & Tamara Seer)
  - Two-women bobsleigh #2 winners: Canada (Alysia Rissling & Kristen Bujnowski)
- January 4 – 6: IEC #6 in Winterberg #2
  - Two-man bobsleigh winners: Germany (Dennis Pihale & Lukas Frytz)
  - Four-man bobsleigh #1 winners: Germany (Christoph Hafer, Christian Hammers, Tobias Schneider, & Matthias Sommer)
  - Four-man bobsleigh #2 winners: Germany (Christoph Hafer, David Golling, Tobias Schneider, & Matthias Sommer)
  - Two-women bobsleigh #1 winners: Germany (Laura Nolte & Deborah Levi)
  - Two-women bobsleigh #2 winners: Romania (Andreea Grecu & Andreea-Teodora Vlad)
- January 10 – 12: IEC #7 in (Austria) Innsbruck #2
  - Two-man bobsleigh winners: Germany (Richard Oelsner & Issam Ammour)
  - Four-man bobsleigh #1 winners: Italy (Patrick Baumgartner, Alex Verginer, Simone Fontana, & Lorenzo Bilotti)
  - Four-man bobsleigh #2 winners: Germany (Jonas Jannusch, Benedikt Hertel, Christian Ebert, & Christian Roeder)
  - Four-man bobsleigh #3 winners: Italy (Patrick Baumgartner, Lorenzo Bilotti, Alex Verginer, & Mattia Variola)
  - Two-women bobsleigh winners: Germany (Kim Kalicki & Kira Lipperheide) (2 times)
- January 11 & 12: IEC #8 in (Germany) Altenberg #2
  - Men's Skeleton winners: (Germany) Dominic Rady (#1) / (Russia) Evgeniy Rukosuev (#2)
  - Women's Skeleton winner: (Germany) Janine Becker (2 times)
- January 25 & 26: IEC #9 (final) in (Latvia) Sigulda
  - Two-man bobsleigh #1 winners: Germany (Christoph Hafer & Tobias Schneider)
  - Two-man bobsleigh #2 winners: Germany (Christoph Hafer & Christian Hammers)
  - Two-women bobsleigh winners: Russia (Lubov Chernykh & Yulia Belomestnykh)
  - Skeleton winners: (Russia) Evgeniy Rukosuev (m) / (Germany) Janine Becker (f)

=== 2018–19 IBSF Intercontinental Cup ===
- November 15 & 16, 2018: SIC #1 in (Austria) Innsbruck
  - Men's Skeleton winners: (United Kingdom) Craig Thompson (#1) / (United Kingdom) Marcus Wyatt (#2)
  - Women's Skeleton winner: (Austria) Janine Flock (2 times)
- November 23 & 24, 2018: SIC #2 in (Germany) Winterberg
  - Men's Skeleton winners: (South Korea) Jung Seung-gi (#1) / (Germany) Kilian Freiherr von Schleinitz (#2)
  - Women's Skeleton winner: (United Kingdom) Laura Deas (2 times)
- January 18 & 19: SIC #3 in (United States) Park City
  - Men's Skeleton winner: (Germany) Felix Keisinger (2 times)
  - Women's Skeleton winners: (United States) Kelly Curtis (#1) / (Germany) Susanne Kreher (#2)
- January 24 & 25: SIC #4 (final) in (United States) Lake Placid
  - Men's Skeleton winner: (Germany) Felix Keisinger (2 times)
  - Women's Skeleton winners: (United Kingdom) Ashleigh Fay Pittaway (#1) / (Germany) Susanne Kreher (#2)

=== 2018–19 IBSF North American Cup ===
- November 7 – 10, 2018: INAC #1 in Whistler
  - Two-man bobsleigh #1 winners: Canada (Justin Kripps & Benjamin Coakwell)
  - Two-man bobsleigh #2 winners: Canada (Justin Kripps & Ryan Sommer)
  - Four-man bobsleigh winners: Canada (Justin Kripps, Ryan Sommer, Cameron Stones, & Benjamin Coakwell) (2 times)
  - Two-women bobsleigh #1 winners: Canada (Julie Johnson & Cynthia Serwaah)
  - Two-women bobsleigh #2 winners: United States (Elana Meyers & Sylvia Hoffmann)
  - Men's Skeleton winners: (China) Geng Wenqiang (#1) / (Ukraine) Vladyslav Heraskevych (#2)
  - Women's Skeleton winners: (Russia) Yulia Kanakina (#1) / (United States) Kendall Wesenberg (#2)
- November 19 – 21, 2018: INAC #2 in (United States) Park City
  - Two-man bobsleigh winners: Monaco (Rudy Rinaldi & Boris Vain) (2 times)
  - Four-man bobsleigh #1 winners: Monaco (Rudy Rinaldi, Steven Borges Mendonaca, Boris Vain, & Thibault Demarthon)
  - Four-man bobsleigh #2 winners: Czech Republic (Dominik Dvořák, Jan Šindelář, Jakub Nosek, & Jaroslav Kopřiva)
  - Two-women bobsleigh winners: Great Britain (Mica McNeill & Montell Douglas) (2 times)
  - Men's Skeleton winner: (United States) Andrew Blaser (2 times)
  - Women's Skeleton winners: (Sweden) Leslie Stratton (#1) / (United States) Kelly Curtis (#2)
- November 30 – December 2, 2018: INAC #3 in Lake Placid
  - Two-man bobsleigh winners: Canada (Christopher Spring & Darren Lundrigan) (2 times)
  - Four-man bobsleigh #1 winners: United States (Hunter Church, Sam Moeller, Jamil Muhammed-Ray, & Christopher Walsh)
  - Four-man bobsleigh #2 winners: Canada (Christopher Spring, Darren Lundrigan, Cyrus Gray, & Gabriel Chiasson)
  - Two-women bobsleigh #1 winners: Great Britain (Mica McNeill & Montell Douglas)
  - Two-women bobsleigh #2 winners: Great Britain (Mica McNeill & Aleasha Kiddle)
  - Men's Skeleton winner: (United States) Andrew Blaser (2 times)
  - Women's Skeleton winner: (United States) Sara Roderick (2 times)
- January 10 – 13: INAC #4 (final) in Calgary
  - Two-man bobsleigh #1 winners: United States (Geoffery Gadbois & Kristopher Horn)
  - Two-man bobsleigh #2 winners: Canada (Christopher Spring & Neville Wright)
  - Four-man bobsleigh #1 winners: United States (Geoffery Gadbois, Kristopher Horn, Christopher Walsh, & Sam Moeller)
  - Four-man bobsleigh #2 winners: United States (Hunter Church, Michael Fogt, Dakota Lynch, & Derek Crittenden)
  - Two-women bobsleigh #1 winners: United States (Kristi Koplin & Terra Evans)
  - Two-women bobsleigh #2 winners: Canada (Kori Hol & Dawn Edith Richardson-Wilson)
  - Men's Skeleton winners: (United Kingdom) Craig Thompson (#1) / (South Korea) Kim Ji-soo (#2)
  - Women's Skeleton winners: (United Kingdom) Ashleigh Fay Pittaway (#1) / (United States) Kelly Curtis (#2)

=== 2018–19 IBSF Para Bobsleigh World Cup ===
- December 14 & 15, 2018: PSWC #1 in (United States) Park City
  - Para Bobsleigh winner: (Canada) Lonnie Bissonnette (2 times)
- December 21 & 22, 2018: PSWC #2 in (Canada) Calgary
  - Para Bobsleigh winners: (Austria) Andreas Kapfinger (#1) / (Norway) Guro Konstanse Fronsdal (#2)
- January 12 & 13: PSWC #3 in (Norway) Lillehammer
  - Para Bobsleigh winner: (Canada) Lonnie Bissonnette (2 times)
- January 19 & 20: PSWC #4 in (Germany) Oberhof
  - Para Bobsleigh winner: (Latvia) Arturs Klots (2 times)
- February 14 & 15: PSWC #5 (final) in (Switzerland) St. Moritz
  - Para Bobsleigh winners: (Sweden) Sebastian Westin (#1) / (Switzerland) Christopher Stewart (#2)

=== 2018–19 IBSF Women's Monobob Events ===
- November 4 & 5, 2018: WME #1 in (Norway) Lillehammer
  - Winner (Australia) Walker Breeana (2 times)
- December 12, 2018: WME #2 in (Germany) Schönau am Königsee
  - Winner: (Canada) Christine de Bruin
- January 10: WME #3 (final) in (Canada) Calgary
  - Winner: (Canada) Melissa Lotholz

== Curling ==
=== International curling championships ===
- October 13 – 20, 2018: 2018 World Mixed Curling Championship in Kelowna
  - Canada (Skip: Mike Anderson) defeated Spain (Skip: Sergio Vez), 6–2, to win Canada's first World Mixed Curling Championship title.
  - Russia (Skip: Alexander Eremin) took third place.
- November 3 – 10, 2018: 2018 Pacific-Asia Curling Championships in Gangneung
  - Men: Japan (Skip: Yuta Matsumura) defeated China (Skip: Zou Qiang), 9–7, to win Japan's fourth Men's Pacific-Asia Curling Championships title.
    - South Korea (Skip: Kim Soo-hyuk) took third place.
  - Women: South Korea (Skip: Kim Min-ji) defeated Japan (Skip: Satsuki Fujisawa), 12–8, to win South Korea's third consecutive and sixth overall Women's Pacific-Asia Curling Championships title.
    - China (Skip: Jiang Yilun) took third place.
- November 16 – 18, 2018: 2018 Americas Challenge in Chaska
  - Champions: United States (Skip: Rich Ruohonen); Second: Guyana (Skip: Rayad Husain); Third: Brazil (Skip: Marcelo Mello)
- November 16 – 24, 2018: 2018 European Curling Championships in (Estonia) Tallinn
  - Men: Scotland (Skip: Bruce Mouat) defeated Sweden (Skip: Niklas Edin), 9–5, to win Scotland's 13th Men's European Curling Championships title.
    - Italy (Skip: Joël Retornaz) took third place.
  - Women: Sweden (Skip: Anna Hasselborg) defeated Switzerland (Skip: Silvana Tirinzoni), 5–4, to win Sweden's 20th Women's European Curling Championships title.
    - Germany (Skip: Daniela Jentsch) took third place.
- February 16 – 23: 2019 World Junior Curling Championships in Liverpool
  - Men: Canada (Skip: Tyler Tardi) defeated Switzerland (Skip: Marco Hösli), 9–4, to win Canada's second consecutive and 20th overall Men's World Junior Curling Championships title.
    - Scotland (Skip: Ross Whyte) took third place.
  - Women: Russia (Skip: Vlada Rumiantseva) defeated Canada (Skip: Selena Sturmay), 8–7, to win Russia's third Women's World Junior Curling Championships title.
    - Switzerland (Skip: Raphaela Keiser) took third place.
- March 3 – 10: 2019 World Wheelchair Curling Championship in Stirling
  - China (Skip: Wang Haitao) defeated Scotland (Skip: Aileen Neilson), 5–2, to win China's first World Wheelchair Curling Championship title.
    - South Korea (Skip: CHA Jin-ho) took third place.
- March 16 – 24: 2019 World Women's Curling Championship in (Denmark) Silkeborg
  - Switzerland (Skip: Silvana Tirinzoni) defeated Sweden (Skip: Anna Hasselborg), 8–7, to win Switzerland's seventh World Women's Curling Championship title.
    - South Korea (Skip: Kim Min-ji) took third place.
- March 30 – April 7: 2019 World Men's Curling Championship in Lethbridge
  - Sweden (Skip: Niklas Edin) defeated Canada (Skip: Kevin Koe), 7–2, to win Sweden's second consecutive and ninth overall World Men's Curling Championship title.
    - Switzerland (Skip: Peter de Cruz) took third place.
- April 20 – 27: 2019 World Mixed Doubles & Senior Curling Championships in (Norway) Stavanger
  - Mixed Doubles: Sweden (Anna Hasselborg & Oskar Eriksson) defeated Canada (Jocelyn Peterman & Brett Gallant), 6–5, to win Sweden's first World Mixed Doubles Curling Championship title.
    - The United States (Cory Christensen & John Shuster) took third place.
  - Senior Men: Canada (Skip: Bryan Cochrane) defeated Scotland (Skip: David Smith), 7–5, to win Canada's second consecutive and 11th overall Men's World Senior Curling Championships title.
    - Denmark (Skip: Ulrik Schmidt) took third place.
  - Senior Women: Canada (Skip: Sherry Anderson) defeated Denmark (Skip: Lene Bidstrup), 10–1, to win Canada's third consecutive and 13th overall Women's World Senior Curling Championships title.
    - Switzerland (Skip: Chantal Forrer) took third place.

=== 2018–19 Curling World Cup ===
- Note: The events that are listed below are all new and are making their debut here.
- September 10 – 16, 2018: 2018–19 Curling World Cup – First Leg in (China) Suzhou
  - Men: Canada (Skip: Kevin Koe) defeated Norway (Skip: Steffen Walstad), 6–5, to win the 2018–19 World Cup first leg for men.
  - Women: Canada (Skip: Rachel Homan) defeated Sweden (Skip: Anna Hasselborg), 7–3, to win the 2018–19 World Cup first leg for women.
  - Mixed Doubles: Canada (Laura Walker & Kirk Muyres) defeated United States (Sarah Anderson & Korey Dropkin), 7–3, to win the 2018–19 World Cup first leg for the mixed doubles event.
- December 5 – 9, 2018: 2018–19 Curling World Cup – Second Leg in Omaha
  - Men: United States (Skip: John Shuster) defeated Sweden (Skip: Niklas Edin), 3–1, to win the 2018–19 World Cup second leg for men.
  - Women: Japan (Skip: Satsuki Fujisawa) defeated South Korea (Skip: Kim Min-ji), 7–6, to win the 2018–19 World Cup second leg for women.
  - Mixed Doubles: Norway (Kristin Skaslien & Magnus Nedregotten) defeated Switzerland (Jenny Perret & Martin Rios), 10–5, to win the 2018–19 World Cup second leg for the mixed doubles event.
- January 28 – February 3: 2018–19 Curling World Cup – Third Leg in Jönköping
  - Men: Canada (Skip: Matt Dunstone) defeated Sweden (Skip: Niklas Edin), 5–4, to win the 2018–19 World Cup third leg for men.
  - Women: South Korea (Skip: Kim Min-ji) defeated Sweden (Skip: Anna Hasselborg), 6–4, to win the 2018–19 World Cup third leg for women.
  - Mixed Doubles: Canada (Kadriana Sahaidak & Colton Lott) defeated Norway (Kristin Skaslien & Thomas Ulsrud), 7–5, to win the 2018–19 World Cup third leg for the mixed doubles event.
- May 8 – 12: 2018–19 Curling World Cup – Grand Final in Beijing
  - Men: Canada (Skip: Kevin Koe) defeated China (Skip: Zou Qiang), 5–3, to win the 2018–19 World Cup Grand Final for men.
  - Women: Canada (Skip: Jennifer Jones) defeated Switzerland (Skip: Silvana Tirinzoni), 9–6, to win the 2018–19 World Cup Grand Final for women.
  - Mixed Doubles: Norway (Kristin Skaslien & Magnus Nedregotten) defeated Canada (Laura Walker & Kirk Muyres), 8–3, to win the 2018–19 World Cup Grand Final for the mixed doubles event.

=== 2018–19 World Curling Tour and Grand Slam of Curling ===
- August 2, 2018 – April 28, 2019: 2018–19 World Curling Tour and Grand Slam of Curling Seasons
  - September 26 – 30, 2018: 2018 Elite 10 (September) in (Ontario) Chatham-Kent
    - Men: (Newfoundland and Labrador) Team Brad Gushue defeated (Manitoba) (Team Reid Carruthers), 2–1, to win their second Men's Elite 10 title.
    - Women: (Sweden) Team Anna Hasselborg defeated (Switzerland) Team Silvana Tirinzoni, 4–0, to win the inaugural Women's Elite 10 title.
  - October 23 – 28, 2018: 2018 Masters in (Nova Scotia) Truro
    - Men: (Ontario) Team John Epping defeated (Alberta) Team Kevin Koe, 7–4, to win their first Men's Masters title.
    - Women: (Sweden) Team Anna Hasselborg defeated (Ontario) Team Rachel Homan, 8–7, to win their first Women's Masters title.
    - Note: Team Hasselborg was the first non-Canadian one to win the women's Masters event.
  - November 6 – 11, 2018: 2018 Tour Challenge in (Ontario) Thunder Bay
    - Men: (Ontario) Team Brad Jacobs) defeated (Alberta) Team Brendan Bottcher, 6–5, to win their first Men's Tour Challenge title.
    - Women: (Ontario) Team Rachel Homan defeated (Manitoba) Team Tracy Fleury, 8–4, to win their first Women's Tour Challenge title.
  - December 11 – 16, 2018: 2018 National in (Newfoundland and Labrador) Conception Bay South
    - Men: (Scotland) Team Ross Paterson) defeated fellow Scottish team (Skip: Bruce Mouat), 4–3, to win their first Men's National title.
    - Women: (Ontario) Team Rachel Homan defeated (Manitoba) Team Kerri Einarson, 4–1, to win their second Women's National title.
  - January 8 – 13: 2019 Canadian Open in (Saskatchewan) North Battleford
    - Men: (Alberta) Team Brendan Bottcher defeated (Ontario) Team John Epping, 6–3, to win their first Men's Canadian Open title.
    - Women: (Ontario) Team Rachel Homan defeated (Switzerland) Team Silvana Tirinzoni, 4–3, to win their second Women's Canadian Open title.
  - April 9 – 14: 2019 Players' Championship in (Ontario) Toronto
    - Men: Team Brendan Bottcher defeated Team Kevin Koe, 6–1, to win Alberta's second consecutive and 14th overall Men's Players' Championship title.
    - Women: Team Kerri Einarson defeated (Sweden) Team Anna Hasselborg, 5–4, to win Manitoba's seventh Women's Players' Championship title.
  - April 23 – 28: 2019 Champions Cup in (Saskatchewan) Saskatoon
    - Men: Team Brendan Bottcher defeated Team Kevin Koe, 6–5, to win Alberta's first Men's Champions Cup & third consecutive Grand Slam title.
    - Women: Team Silvana Tirinzoni defeated (Manitoba) Team Kerri Einarson, 6–3, to win Switzerland's first Women's Champions Cup title.

=== Curling Canada Season of Champions events ===
- December 5–9, 2018: 2018 Canada Cup in (Saskatchewan) Estevan
  - Men: Team Brad Jacobs defeated (Alberta) Team Kevin Koe, 5–4, to win Ontario's second Men's Canada Cup title.
  - Women: Team Jennifer Jones defeated Team Kerri Einarson, 8–5, to win Manitoba's second consecutive and fifth overall Women's Canada Cup title.
- January 17–20: 2019 Continental Cup in (United States) Paradise, Nevada
  - (United Nations) Team World defeated (Canada) / (United States) Team North America, 34–26 points, to win their fifth Continental Cup title.
- January 19–27: 2019 Canadian Junior Curling Championships in (Saskatchewan) Prince Albert
  - Men: Team Tyler Tardi defeated (Manitoba) Team J.T. Ryan, 7–5, to win British Columbia's third consecutive and seventh overall Men's Canadian Junior Curling Championships title.
  - Women: Team Selena Sturmay defeated (British Columbia) Team Sarah Daniels, 9–6, to win Alberta's tenth Women's Canadian Junior Curling Championships title.
- February 16–24: 2019 Scotties Tournament of Hearts in (Nova Scotia) Sydney
  - Women: Team Chelsea Carey defeated (Ontario) Team Rachel Homan, 8–6, to win Alberta's fourth Scotties Tournament of Hearts title.
- March 2–10: 2019 Tim Hortons Brier in (Manitoba) Brandon
  - Men: Team Kevin Koe defeated Team Brendan Bottcher (wildcard), 4–3, to win Alberta's 28th Tim Hortons Brier title.

== Figure skating ==
=== International figure skating events ===
- January 21 – 27: 2019 European Figure Skating Championships in (Belarus) Minsk
  - Men's winner: (Spain) Javier Fernández
  - Ladies' winner: (Russia) Sofia Samodurova
  - Pairs winners: France (Vanessa James & Morgan Ciprès)
  - Ice Dance winners: France (Gabriella Papadakis & Guillaume Cizeron)
- February 4 – 10: 2019 Four Continents Figure Skating Championships in Anaheim, California
  - Men's winner: (Japan) Shoma Uno
  - Ladies' winner: (Japan) Rika Kihira
  - Pairs winners: China (Sui Wenjing & Han Cong)
  - Ice Dance winners: United States (Madison Chock & Evan Bates)
- March 4 – 10: 2019 World Junior Figure Skating Championships in (Croatia) Zagreb
  - Men's winner: (United States) Tomoki Hiwatashi
  - Ladies' winner: (Russia) Alexandra Trusova
  - Pairs winners: Russia (Anastasia Mishina & Aleksandr Galliamov)
  - Ice Dance winners: Canada (Marjorie Lajoie & Zachary Lagha)
- March 18 – 24: 2019 World Figure Skating Championships in (Japan) Saitama
  - Men's winner: (United States) Nathan Chen
  - Ladies' winner: (Russia) Alina Zagitova
  - Pairs winners: China (Sui Wenjing & Han Cong)
  - Ice Dance winners: France (Gabriella Papadakis & Guillaume Cizeron)

=== 2018–19 ISU Grand Prix of Figure Skating ===
- October 19 – 21: 2018 Skate America in Everett, Washington
  - Men's winner: (United States) Nathan Chen
  - Ladies' winner: (Japan) Satoko Miyahara
  - Pairs winners: Russia (Evgenia Tarasova & Vladimir Morozov)
  - Ice Dance winners: United States (Madison Hubbell & Zachary Donohue)
- October 26 – 28: 2018 Skate Canada International in Laval, Quebec
  - Men's winner: (Japan) Shoma Uno
  - Ladies' winner: (Russia) Elizaveta Tuktamysheva
  - Pairs winners: France (Vanessa James & Morgan Ciprès)
  - Ice Dance winners: United States (Madison Hubbell & Zachary Donohue)
- November 2 – 4: 2018 Grand Prix of Figure Skating #3 in (Finland) Helsinki
  - Men's winner: (Japan) Yuzuru Hanyu
  - Ladies' winner: (Russia) Alina Zagitova
  - Pairs winners: Russia (Natalya Zabiyako & Alexander Enbert)
  - Ice Dance winners: Russia (Alexandra Stepanova & Ivan Bukin)
- November 9 – 11: 2018 NHK Trophy in (Japan) Hiroshima
  - Men's winner: (Japan) Shoma Uno
  - Ladies' winner: (Japan) Rika Kihira
  - Pairs winners: Russia (Natalya Zabiyako & Alexander Enbert)
  - Ice Dance winners: United States (Kaitlin Hawayek & Jean-Luc Baker)
- November 16 – 18: 2018 Rostelecom Cup in Moscow
  - Men's winner: (Japan) Yuzuru Hanyu
  - Ladies' winner: (Russia) Alina Zagitova
  - Pairs winners: Russia (Evgenia Tarasova & Vladimir Morozov)
  - Ice Dance winners: Russia (Alexandra Stepanova & Ivan Bukin)
- November 23 – 25: 2018 Internationaux de France in Grenoble
  - Men's winner: (United States) Nathan Chen
  - Ladies' winner: (Japan) Rika Kihira
  - Pairs winners: France (Vanessa James & Morgan Ciprès)
  - Ice Dance winners: France (Gabriella Papadakis & Guillaume Cizeron)
- December 6 – 9: 2018–19 Grand Prix of Figure Skating Final in (Canada) Vancouver
  - Men's winner: (United States) Nathan Chen
  - Ladies' winner: (Japan) Rika Kihira
  - Pairs winners: France (Vanessa James & Morgan Ciprès)
  - Ice Dance winners: United States (Madison Hubbell & Zachary Donohue)

=== 2018–19 ISU Junior Grand Prix of Figure Skating ===
- August 22 – 25: JGP #1 in (Slovakia) Bratislava
  - Junior Men's winner: (Canada) Stephen Gogolev
  - Junior Ladies' winner: (Russia) Anna Shcherbakova
  - Junior Pairs winners: Russia (Anastasia Mishina & Aleksandr Galiamov)
  - Junior Ice Dance winners: Russia (Elizaveta Khudaiberdieva & Nikita Nazarov)
- August 29 – September 1: JGP #2 in (Austria) Linz
  - Junior Men's winner: (United States) Camden Pulkinen
  - Junior Ladies' winner: (Russia) Alena Kostornaia
  - Junior Pairs winners: Russia (Polina Kostiukovich & Dmitrii Ialin)
  - Junior Ice Dance winners: Russia (Sofia Shevchenko & Igor Eremenko)
- September 5 – 8: JGP #3 in (Lithuania) Kaunas
  - Note: There was no junior pairs event here.
  - Junior Men's winner: (United States) Andrew Torgashev
  - Junior Ladies' winner: (Russia) Alexandra Trusova
  - Junior Ice Dance winners: Russia (Arina Ushakova & Maxim Nekrasov)
- September 12 – 15: JGP #4 in Richmond
  - Junior Men's winner: (Russia) Petr Gumennik
  - Junior Ladies' winner: (Russia) Anna Shcherbakova
  - Junior Pairs winners: Russia (Anastasia Mishina & Aleksandr Galiamov)
  - Junior Ice Dance winners: Canada (Marjorie Lajoie & Zachary Lagha)
- September 26 – 29: JGP #5 in (Czech Republic) Ostrava
  - Junior Men's winner: (Russia) Andrei Mozalev
  - Junior Ladies' winner: (Russia) Alena Kostornaia
  - Junior Pairs winners: Russia (Kseniia Akhanteva & Valerii Kolesov)
  - Junior Ice Dance winners: Russia (Elizaveta Khudaiberdieva & Nikita Nazarov)
- October 3 – 6: JGP #6 in (Slovenia) Ljubljana
  - Note: There was no junior pairs event here.
  - Junior Men's winner: (Russia) Petr Gumennik
  - Junior Ladies' winner: (Russia) Anastasia Tarakanova
  - Junior Ice Dance winners: United States (Avonley Nguyen & Vadym Kolesnik)
- October 10 – 13: JGP #7 in (Armenia) Yerevan
  - Note: There was no junior pairs event here.
  - Junior Men's winner: (France) Adam Siao-Him Fa
  - Junior Ladies' winner: (Russia) Alexandra Trusova
  - Junior Ice Dance winners: Russia (Arina Ushakova & Maxim Nekrasov)
- December 6 – 9: 2018–19 Grand Prix of Figure Skating Final in (Canada) Vancouver
  - Junior Men's winner: (Canada) Stephen Gogolev
  - Junior Ladies' winner: (Russia) Alena Kostornaia
  - Junior Pairs winners: Russia (Anastasia Mishina & Aleksandr Galiamov)
  - Junior Ice Dance winners: Russia (Sofia Shevchenko & Igor Eremenko)

== Ice hockey ==
=== Main world ice hockey championships ===
- December 26, 2018 – January 5, 2019: 2019 World Junior Ice Hockey Championships in (Canada) Vancouver & Victoria
  - Finland defeated the United States, 3–2, to win their fifth World Junior Ice Hockey Championships title.
  - Russia took third place.
- January 6 – 13: 2019 IIHF World Women's U18 Championship in (Japan) Obihiro
  - Canada defeated the United States, 3–2 in overtime, to win their fifth IIHF World Women's U18 Championship title.
  - Finland took third place.
- April 4 – 14: 2019 IIHF Women's World Championship in Espoo
  - The United States defeated Finland, 2–1 in a shootout, to win their fifth consecutive and ninth overall IIHF Women's World Championship title.
  - Canada took third place.
  - Note: This was the first IIHF Women's World Championship final that was not a Canada–USA matchup.
- April 18 – 28: 2019 IIHF World U18 Championships in Örnsköldsvik & Umeå
  - Sweden defeated Russia, 4–3 in overtime, to win their first IIHF World U18 Championship title.
  - United States took third place.
- May 10 – 26: 2019 IIHF World Championship in (Slovakia) Bratislava and Košice
  - Finland defeated Canada, 3–1, to win their third IIHF World Championship title.
  - Russia took third place.

=== 2019 world ice hockey divisions ===
- December 8, 2018 – May 5, 2019: 2019 IIHF World Ice Hockey Divisions

2019 IIHF Ice Hockey World Championships

- March 31 – April 6: Division III Qualification in Abu Dhabi
  - Final Round Robin Ranking: 1. United Arab Emirates, 2. Hong Kong, 3. Thailand, 4. Bosnia and Herzegovina, 5. Kuwait, 6. Kyrgyzstan
  - The United Arab Emirates was promoted to Division III for 2020.
- April 9 – 15: Division II – Group A in Belgrade
  - Final Round Robin Ranking: 1. Serbia, 2. Croatia, 3. Australia, 4. Spain, 5. China, 6. Belgium
  - Serbia was promoted to Division I – Group B for 2020. Belgium was relegated to Division II – Group B for 2020.
- April 21 – 27: Division II – Group B in Mexico City
  - Final Round Robin Ranking: 1. Israel, 2. Iceland, 3. New Zealand, 4. Georgia, 5. Mexico, 6. North Korea
  - Israel was promoted to Division II – Group A for 2020. North Korea was relegated to Division III for 2020.
- April 22 – 28: Division III in Sofia
  - Final Round Robin Ranking: 1. Bulgaria, 2. Turkey, 3. Turkmenistan, 4. Luxembourg, 5. Chinese Taipei, 6. South Africa
  - Bulgaria was promoted to Division II – Group B for 2020. South Africa was relegated to Division III Qualification for 2020.
- April 28 – May 4: Division I – Group B in Tallinn
  - Final Round Robin Ranking: 1. Romania, 2. Poland, 3. Japan, 4. Estonia, 5. Ukraine, 6. Netherlands
  - Romania was promoted to Division I – Group A for 2020. The Netherlands was relegated to Division II – Group A for 2020.
- April 29 – May 5: Division I – Group A in Astana
  - Final Round Robin Ranking: 1. Kazakhstan, 2. Belarus, 3. South Korea, 4. Slovenia, 5. Hungary, 6. Lithuania
  - Both Kazakhstan and Belarus was promoted to Top Division for 2020. Lithuania was relegated to Division I – Group B for 2020.

2019 IIHF World U20 Championship (Junior)

- December 8 – 14, 2018: Division I – Group B in Tychy
  - Final Round Robin Ranking: 1. Slovenia, 2. Poland, 3. Hungary, 4. Italy, 5. Ukraine, 6. Japan
  - Slovenia was promoted to Division I – Group A for 2020. Japan was relegated to Division II – Group A for 2020.
- December 9 – 15, 2018: Division I – Group A in Füssen
  - Final Round Robin Ranking: 1. Germany, 2. Belarus, 3. Norway, 4. Latvia, 5. Austria, 6. France
  - Germany was promoted to Top Division for 2020. France was relegated to Division I – Group B for 2020.
- January 13 – 19: Division II – Group A in Tallinn
  - Final Round Robin Ranking: 1. Estonia, 2. Lithuania, 3. Great Britain, 4. Romania, 5. Spain, 6. South Korea
  - Estonia was promoted to Division I – Group B for 2020. South Korea was relegated to Division II – Group B for 2020.
- January 14 – 20: Division III in Reykjavík
  - Final Round Robin Ranking: 1. China, 2. Australia, 3. Turkey, 4. Bulgaria, 5. Iceland, 6. Chinese Taipei, 7. South Africa, 8. New Zealand
  - China was promoted to Division II – Group B for 2020.
- January 15 – 21: Division II – Group B in Zagreb
  - Final Round Robin Ranking: 1. Serbia, 2. Croatia, 3. Netherlands, 4. Belgium, 5. Israel, 6. Mexico
  - Serbia was promoted to Division II – Group A for 2020. Mexico was relegated to Division III for 2020.

2019 IIHF World U18 Championships

- March 25 – 31: Division II – Group B in Belgrade
  - Final Round Robin Ranking: 1. Serbia, 2. China, 3. Netherlands, 4. Croatia, 5. Australia, 6. Belgium
  - Serbia was promoted to Division II – Group A for 2020. Belgium was relegated to Division III – Group A for 2020.
- March 25 – 31: Division III – Group A in Sofia
  - Final Round Robin Ranking: 1. Bulgaria, 2. Israel, 3. Iceland, 4. Turkey, 5. Mexico, 6. New Zealand
  - Bulgaria was promoted to Division II – Group B for 2020. New Zealand was relegated to Division III – Group B for 2020.
- April 7 – 13: Division II – Group A in Elektrėnai
  - Final Round Robin Ranking: 1. Poland, 2. Lithuania, 3. Estonia, 4. Romania, 5. South Korea, 6. Spain
  - Poland was promoted to Division I – Group B for 2020. Spain was relegated to Division II – Group B for 2020.
- April 9 – 12: Division III – Group B in Cape Town
  - Final Round Robin Ranking: 1. Chinese Taipei, 2. Hong Kong, 3. South Africa, 4. Luxembourg
  - Chinese Taipei was promoted to Division III – Group A for 2020.
- April 14 – 20: Division I – Group A in Grenoble
  - Final Round Robin Ranking: 1. Germany, 2. Kazakhstan, 3. Denmark, 4. Norway, 5. France, 6. Ukraine
  - Germany was promoted to Top Division for 2020. Ukraine was relegated to Division I – Group B for 2020.
- April 14 – 20: Division I – Group B in Székesfehérvár
  - Final Round Robin Ranking: 1. Japan, 2. Austria, 3. Hungary, 4. Italy, 5. Slovenia, 6. Great Britain
  - Japan was promoted to Division I – Group A for 2020. Great Britain was relegated to Division II – Group A for 2020.

2019 IIHF Women's World Championship

- January 13 – 18: Division II – Group B Qualification in Cape Town
  - Final Round Robin Ranking: 1. Ukraine, 2. Belgium, 3. South Africa, 4. Hong Kong, 5. Bulgaria
  - Ukraine was promoted to Division II – Group B for 2020.
- April 1 – 7: Division II – Group B in Brașov
  - Final Round Robin Ranking: 1. Chinese Taipei, 2. New Zealand, 3. Iceland, 4. Turkey, 5. Croatia, 6. Romania
  - Chinese Taipei was promoted to Division II – Group A for 2020. Romania was relegated to Division II – Group B Qualification for 2020.
- April 2 – 8: Division II – Group A in (United Kingdom) Dumfries
  - Final Round Robin Ranking: 1. Slovenia, 2. Great Britain, 3. Spain, 4. Mexico, 5. North Korea, 6. Australia
  - Slovenia was promoted to Division I – Group B for 2020. Australia was relegated to Division II – Group B for 2020.
- April 6 – 12: Division I – Group B in Beijing
  - Final Round Robin Ranking: 1. Netherlands, 2. South Korea, 3. Poland, 4. China, 5. Kazakhstan, 6. Latvia
  - The Netherlands was promoted to Division I – Group A for 2020. Latvia was relegated to Division II – Group A for 2020.
- April 7 – 13: Division I – Group A in Budapest
  - Final Round Robin Ranking: 1. Hungary, 2. Denmark, 3. Norway, 4. Austria, 5. Slovakia, 6. Italy
  - Hungary and Denmark were promoted to Top Division for 2020. Italy was relegated to Division I – Group B for 2020.

2019 IIHF World Women's U18 Championship

- January 6 – 12: Division I – Group B in (United Kingdom) Dumfries
  - Final Round Robin Ranking: 1. France, 2. Norway, 3. Great Britain, 4. Poland, 5. China, 6. Netherlands
  - France was promoted to Division I – Group A for 2020. The Netherlands was relegated to Division I – Group B Qualification for 2020.
- January 7 – 13: Division I – Group A in Radenthein
  - Final Round Robin Ranking: 1. Slovakia, 2. Germany, 3. Hungary, 4. Italy, 5. Denmark, 6. Austria
  - Slovakia was promoted to Top Division for 2020. Austria was relegated to Division I – Group B for 2020.
- January 12 – 18: Division I – Group B Qualification in Jaca
  - Final Round Robin Ranking: 1. South Korea, 2. Kazakhstan, 3. Chinese Taipei, 4. Australia, 5. Spain, 6. Turkey, 7. Mexico
  - South Korea was promoted to Division I – Group B for 2020.

=== National Hockey League ===
- October 3, 2018 – April 6, 2019: 2018–19 NHL season
  - Presidents' Trophy and Eastern Conference winners: (Florida) Tampa Bay Lightning
  - Western Conference winners: (Alberta) Calgary Flames
  - Art Ross Trophy winner: (Russia) Nikita Kucherov ( (Florida) Tampa Bay Lightning)
- January 1: 2019 NHL Winter Classic at Notre Dame Stadium in (Indiana) Notre Dame
  - The (Massachusetts) Boston Bruins defeated the (Illinois) Chicago Blackhawks, with the score of 4–2.
- January 26: 2019 National Hockey League All-Star Game at SAP Center in (California) San Jose
  - All-Star Game: Team Metropolitan defeated Team Central 10–5.
  - All-Star Game MVP: (Nova Scotia) Sidney Crosby ( (Pennsylvania) Pittsburgh Penguins)
  - Fastest skater: (Ontario) Connor McDavid ( (Alberta) Edmonton Oilers)
  - Puck control: (New Jersey) Johnny Gaudreau ( (Alberta) Calgary Flames)
  - Save streak: (Sweden) Henrik Lundqvist ( (New York (state)) New York Rangers)
  - Premier passer: (Germany) Leon Draisaitl ( (Alberta) Edmonton Oilers)
  - Hardest shot: (Massachusetts) John Carlson ( (Washington, D.C.) Washington Capitals)
  - Accuracy shooting: (Czech Republic) David Pastrňák ( (Massachusetts) Boston Bruins)
- February 23: 2019 NHL Stadium Series at Lincoln Financial Field in (Pennsylvania) Philadelphia
  - The (Pennsylvania) Philadelphia Flyers defeated the (Pennsylvania) Pittsburgh Penguins, with the score of 4–3 in overtime.
- April 10 – June 12: 2019 Stanley Cup playoffs
  - The (Missouri) St. Louis Blues defeated the (Massachusetts) Boston Bruins, 4–3 in games played, to win their first Stanley Cup championship.
- June 21 & 22: 2019 NHL entry draft at Rogers Arena in (British Columbia) Vancouver
  - #1: (Florida) Jack Hughes (to the New Jersey Devils from the (Michigan) U.S. NTDP)

=== Kontinental Hockey League ===
- September 1, 2018 – April 19, 2019: 2018–19 KHL season
  - (Russia) CSKA swept fellow Russian team, Avangard, 4–0 in the best-of-seven final series to win their first Gagarin Cup title.

=== North America (ice hockey) ===
==== United States (AHL/ECHL/USHL) ====
- October 5, 2018 – April 15: 2018–19 AHL season
  - Macgregor Kilpatrick Trophy & Atlantic Division winners: (North Carolina) Charlotte Checkers
  - North Division winners: (New York (state)) Syracuse Crunch
  - Central Division winners: (Illinois) Chicago Wolves
  - Pacific Division winners: (California) Bakersfield Condors
  - April 17 – June 8: 2019 Calder Cup playoffs
    - The (North Carolina) Charlotte Checkers defeated the (Illinois) Chicago Wolves, 4–1 in games played (out of 7), to win their first Calder Cup title.
- October 5, 2018 – April 13: 2018–19 USHL season
  - Anderson Cup & Western Conference winners: (Nebraska) Tri-City Storm
  - Eastern Conference winners: (Michigan) Muskegon Lumberjacks
  - April 15 – May 17: 2019 Clark Cup playoffs
    - The (South Dakota) Sioux Falls Stampede defeated the (Illinois) Chicago Steel, 3–0 in games played (out of 5), to win their third Clark Cup title.
- October 12, 2018 – April 7: 2018–19 ECHL season
  - Brabham Cup & Central Division winners: (Ohio) Cincinnati Cyclones
  - North Division winners: (Newfoundland and Labrador) Newfoundland Growlers
  - South Division winners: Florida Everblades
  - Mountain Division winners: (Oklahoma) Tulsa Oilers
  - April 11 – June 4: 2019 Kelly Cup playoffs
    - The (Newfoundland and Labrador) Newfoundland Growlers defeated the (Ohio) Toledo Walleye, 4–2 in games played (out of 7), to win their first Kelly Cup title.

==== Junior (OHL/QMJHL/WHL) ====
- September 19, 2018 – March 17, 2019: 2018–19 OHL season
  - Hamilton Spectator Trophy & East Division winners: (Ontario) Ottawa 67's
  - Central Division: (Ontario) Niagara IceDogs
  - Midwest Division: (Ontario) London Knights
  - West Division: (Michigan) Saginaw Spirit
- September 20, 2018 – March 16, 2019: 2018–19 QMJHL season
  - Jean Rougeau Trophy & West Division winners: (Quebec) Rouyn-Noranda Huskies
  - Maritimes Division: (Nova Scotia) Halifax Mooseheads
  - East Division: (Quebec) Baie-Comeau Drakkar
  - Central Division: (Quebec) Drummondville Voltigeurs
- September 21, 2018 – March 17, 2019: 2018–19 WHL season
  - Scotty Munro Memorial Trophy & East Division winners: (Saskatchewan) Prince Albert Raiders
  - Central Division: (Alberta) Edmonton Oil Kings
  - U.S. Division: (Washington (state)) Everett Silvertips
  - B.C. Division: (British Columbia) Vancouver Giants
- May 17 – 26: 2019 Memorial Cup at Scotiabank Centre in (Nova Scotia) Halifax
  - The (Quebec) Rouyn-Noranda Huskies defeated the (Nova Scotia) Halifax Mooseheads, 4–2, to win their first Memorial Cup title.

==== College (USA–NCAA–Division I) ====
- March 16 – 24: 2019 NCAA National Collegiate Women's Ice Hockey Tournament (Frozen Four at People's United Center in (Connecticut) Hamden)
  - The Wisconsin Badgers defeated the Minnesota Golden Gophers 2–0 to win their fifth NCAA National Collegiate Women's Ice Hockey title.
- March 29 – April 13: 2019 NCAA Division I Men's Ice Hockey Tournament (Frozen Four at KeyBank Center in (New York (state)) Buffalo)
  - The Minnesota–Duluth Bulldogs defeated the (Massachusetts) UMass Minutemen 3–0 to win their second consecutive and third overall NCAA Division I Men's Ice Hockey title.

==== Women (CWHL/NWHL) ====
- October 6, 2018 – March 3, 2019: 2018–19 NWHL season
  - Regular season winners: Minnesota Whitecaps
  - March 6 – 17: 2019 Isobel Cup Playoffs
    - The Minnesota Whitecaps defeated the (New York (state)) Buffalo Beauts, 2–1 in overtime, to win their first Isobel Cup title.
- March 24: 2019 Clarkson Cup in (Ontario) Toronto
  - The (Alberta) Calgary Inferno defeated the (Quebec) Les Canadiennes de Montréal, 5–2, to win their second Clarkson Cup title.

==== Senior ====
- April 8 – 13: 2019 Allan Cup in Lacombe, Alberta
  - The (Alberta) Lacombe Generals defeated fellow Albertan team, the Innisfail Eagles, 5–2, to win their first Allan Cup title.

=== Europe (ice hockey) ===
- August 30, 2018 – February 5, 2019: 2018–19 Champions Hockey League
  - (Sweden) Frölunda HC defeated (Germany) EHC Red Bull München, 3–1, to win their third Champions Hockey League title.
  - (Czech Republic) HC Plzen and (Austria) EC Red Bull Salzburg finished in joint third place, as the losing semi-finalists.
- September 28, 2018 – January 13, 2019: 2018–19 IIHF Continental Cup
  - Final Ranking: 1. (Kazakhstan) Arlan Kokshetau, 2. (United Kingdom) Belfast Giants, 3. (Poland) GKS Katowice, 4. (Belarus) HK Gomel

=== Asia (ice hockey) ===
- September 1, 2018 – February 2, 2019: 2018–19 Asia League Ice Hockey season
  - Note: The top 5 ice hockey teams named below would get to play in the playoffs.
  - 1st Place: (South Korea) Daemyung Killer Whales; 2nd Place: (Russia) Sakhalin; Third: (South Korea) Anyang Halla; Fourth: (Japan) Nippon Paper Cranes; Fifth: (Japan) Oji Eagles
  - February 16 – March 17: 2018–19 Asia League Ice Hockey Playoffs
    - (Russia) Sakhalin defeated (Japan) Nippon Paper Cranes, in order to win their first Asia League Ice Hockey title.
- December 3 – 6, 2018: 2019 IIHF Ice Hockey U20 Challenge Cup of Asia Division I in (Malaysia) Kuala Lumpur
  - Final Round Robin Ranking: 1. Thailand, 2. Mongolia, 3. Indonesia, 4. Kuwait
- December 6 – 8, 2018: 2019 IIHF U20 Challenge Cup of Asia in Kuala Lumpur
  - Final Round Robin Ranking: 1. Malaysia, 2. Kyrgyzstan, 3. Philippines, 4. United Arab Emirates
- March 1 – 9: 2019 IIHF Challenge Cup of Asia in Kuala Lumpur
  - Final Ranking: 1. Mongolia, 2. Philippines, 3. Singapore, 4. Malaysia, 5. Indonesia, 6. Macau, 7. Oman
  - Mongolia defeated the Philippines, 6–3, to win their second consecutive IIHF Challenge Cup of Asia title.
  - Singapore took third place.
- April 14 – 19: 2019 IIHF Women's Challenge Cup of Asia in (United Arab Emirates) Abu Dhabi
  - Final Round Robin Ranking: 1. Thailand, 2. Chinese Taipei, 3. Singapore, 4. New Zealand U18, 5. Malaysia
- April 14 – 19: 2019 IIHF Women's Challenge Cup of Asia Division I in Abu Dhabi
  - Final Round Robin Ranking: 1. Philippines, 2. United Arab Emirates, 3. India, 4. Kuwait

=== Other ice hockey tournaments ===
- November 9 – 11, 2018: 2018 LATAM Cup in (United States) Coral Springs
  - Final Ranking: 1. Colombia, 2. Mexico Selects, 3. Argentina, 4. Venezuela, 5. Brazil
  - Colombia defeated Mexico Selects, 12–3, to win their first LATAM Cup title.
- November 19 – 21, 2018: 2018 Development Cup in (Germany) Füssen
  - Final Ranking: 1. Macedonia, 2. Portugal, 3. Ireland, 4. Andorra
  - Macedonia defeated Portugal, 9–3, to win their first Development Cup title.

== Luge ==
=== International luge events ===
- December 14 & 15, 2018: 2018 Junior America-Pacific Luge Championships in (Canada) Calgary
  - Note: There was no junior men's doubles event here.
  - Junior Men's singles: (United States) Sean Hollander
  - Junior Women's singles: (Canada) Sam Judson
- December 15 & 16, 2018: 2018 America-Pacific Luge Championships in (United States) Lake Placid
  - Men's singles: (United States) Chris Mazdzer
  - Women's singles: (United States) Emily Sweeney
  - Men's doubles: Canada (Tristan Walker & Justin Snith)
- January 17 – 19: FIL Junior European Luge Championships 2019 in (Switzerland) St. Moritz
  - Junior Men's singles: (Germany) David Noessler
  - Junior Women's singles: (Italy) Verena Hofer
  - Junior Men's doubles: Germany (Hannes Orlamuender & Paul Constantin Gubitz)
- January 25 – 27: 2019 FIL World Luge Championships in Winterberg
  - Men's singles: (Germany) Felix Loch
  - Women's singles: (Germany) Natalie Geisenberger
  - Men's doubles: Germany (Toni Eggert & Sascha Benecken)
- January 31 – February 3: FIL World Luge Natural Track Championships 2019 in Latzfons
  - Men's singles: (Italy) Alex Gruber
  - Women's singles: (Italy) Evelin Lanthaler
  - Men's doubles: Italy (Patrick Pigneter & Florian Clara)
- February 1 & 2: FIL Junior World Luge Championships 2019 in (Austria) Innsbruck
  - Junior Men's singles: (Germany) Max Langenhan
  - Junior Women's singles: (Germany) Cheyenne Rosenthal
  - Junior Men's doubles: Germany (Hannes Orlamuender & Paul Constantin Gubitz)
- February 9 & 10: 2019 FIL European Luge Championships in Oberhof
  - Men's singles: (Russia) Semen Pavlichenko
  - Women's singles: (Germany) Natalie Geisenberger
  - Men's doubles: Germany (Tobias Wendl & Tobias Arlt)
- February 22 – 24: FIL Junior European Luge Championships 2019 in Umhausen
  - Men's singles: (Austria) Fabian Achenrainer
  - Women's singles: (Italy) Daniela Mittermair
  - Men's doubles: Austria (Fabian Achenrainer & Miguel Brugger)

=== 2018–19 Luge World Cup ===
- November 24 & 25, 2018: LWC #1 in Innsbruck
  - Men's singles: (Germany) Johannes Ludwig
  - Women's singles: (Germany) Natalie Geisenberger
  - Men's doubles: Austria (Thomas Steu & Lorenz Koller)
- November 30 & December 1, 2018: LWC #2 in (Canada) Whistler
  - Men's singles: (Austria) Wolfgang Kindl
  - Women's singles: (Germany) Natalie Geisenberger
  - Men's doubles: Germany (Toni Eggert & Sascha Benecken)
- December 7 & 8, 2018: LWC #3 in (Canada) Calgary
  - Men's singles: (Austria) Wolfgang Kindl
  - Women's singles: (Germany) Julia Taubitz
  - Men's doubles: Germany (Tobias Wendl & Tobias Arlt)
- December 15 & 16, 2018: LWC #4 in (United States) Lake Placid
  - Men's singles: (Russia) Roman Repilov
  - Women's singles: (Germany) Dajana Eitberger
  - Men's doubles: Germany (Toni Eggert & Sascha Benecken)
- January 5 & 6: LWC #5 in Berchtesgaden-Königssee
  - Men's singles: (Austria) Reinhard Egger
  - Women's singles: (Germany) Julia Taubitz
  - Men's doubles: Germany (Toni Eggert & Sascha Benecken)
- January 12 & 13: LWC #6 in (Latvia) Sigulda
  - Men's singles: (Russia) Semen Pavlichenko
  - Women's singles: (Russia) Tatiana Ivanova
  - Men's doubles: Germany (Toni Eggert & Sascha Benecken)
- February 2 & 3: LWC #7 in (Germany) Altenberg
  - Men's singles: (Germany) Felix Loch
  - Women's singles: (Italy) Sandra Robatscher
  - Men's doubles: Austria (Thomas Steu & Lorenz Koller)
- February 9 & 10: LWC #8 in Oberhof
  - Men's singles: (Russia) Semen Pavlichenko
  - Women's singles: (Germany) Natalie Geisenberger
  - Men's doubles: Germany (Tobias Wendl & Tobias Arlt)
- February 23 & 24: LWC #9 (final) in Sochi
  - Men's singles: (Russia) Semen Pavlichenko
  - Women's singles: (Germany) Natalie Geisenberger
  - Men's doubles: Russia (Alexander Denisyev & Vladislav Antonov)

=== 2018–19 Team Relay Luge World Cup ===
- November 30 & December 1, 2018: TRLWC #1 in (Canada) Whistler
  - Winners: Russia (Tatiana Ivanova, Semen Pavlichenko, & Vsevolod Kashkin and Konstatin Korshunov)
- December 7 & 8, 2018: TRLWC #2 in (Canada) Calgary
  - Winners: Germany (Julia Taubitz, Felix Loch, & Tobias Wendl and Tobias Arlt)
- January 5 & 6: TRLWC #3 in Berchtesgaden-Königssee
  - Winners: Germany (Julia Taubitz, Sebastian Bley, & Toni Eggert and Sascha Benecken)
- January 12 & 13: TRLWC #4 in Sigulda
  - Winners: Latvia (Kendija Aparjode, Kristers Aparjods, & Oskars Gudramovičs and Pēteris Kalniņš)
- February 9 & 10: TRLWC #5 in (Germany) Oberhof
  - Winners: Italy (Andrea Vötter, Dominik Fischnaller, & Ivan Nagler and Fabian Malleier)
- February 24: TRLWC #6 (final) in Sochi
  - Winners: Russia (Viktoriia Demchenko, Semen Pavlichenko, & Alexander Denisyev and Vladislav Antonov)

=== 2018–19 Sprint Luge World Cup ===
- November 24 & 25, 2018: SLWC #1 in Innsbruck
  - Men's singles: (Austria) Wolfgang Kindl
  - Women's singles: (Germany) Natalie Geisenberger
  - Men's doubles: Austria (Thomas Steu & Lorenz Koller)
- December 15 & 16, 2018: SLWC #2 in (United States) Lake Placid
  - Men's singles: (Russia) Roman Repilov
  - Women's singles: (Germany) Natalie Geisenberger
  - Men's doubles: Germany (Toni Eggert & Sascha Benecken)
- February 23 & 24: SLWC #3 (final) in Sochi
  - Men's singles: (Russia) Semen Pavlichenko
  - Women's singles: (Russia) Viktoriia Demchenko
  - Men's doubles: Russia (Alexander Denisyev & Vladislav Antonov)

=== 2018–19 Natural Track Luge World Cup ===
- December 15 & 16, 2018: NTLWC #1 in Kühtai
  - Men's singles: (Italy) Alex Gruber
  - Women's singles: (Italy) Evelin Lanthaler
  - Men's doubles: Austria (Rupert Brueggler & Tobias Angerer)
  - Team: Italy (Evelin Lanthaler, Florian Clara, & Alex Gruber)
- January 10 – 12: NTLWC #2 in Obdach-Winterleiten
  - Men's singles: (Austria) Thomas Kammerlander
  - Women's singles: (Italy) Evelin Lanthaler
  - Men's doubles: Italy (Patrick Pigneter & Florian Clara)
  - Team: Austria (Tina Unterberger, Michael Scheikl, & Thomas Kammerlander)
- January 18 – 20: NTLWC #3 in (Russia) Moscow
  - Men's singles: (Italy) Alex Gruber
  - Women's singles: (Italy) Evelin Lanthaler
  - Men's doubles: Italy (Patrick Pigneter & Florian Clara)
- January 25 – 27: NTLWC #4 in Deutschnofen
  - Men's singles: (Italy) Alex Gruber
  - Women's singles: (Italy) Evelin Lanthaler
  - Men's doubles: Italy (Patrick Pigneter & Florian Clara)
  - Team: Italy (Evelin Lanthaler, Patrick Pigneter, & Alex Gruber)
- February 8 – 10: NTLWC #5 in (Romania) Vatra Dornei
  - Men's singles: (Austria) Thomas Kammerlander
  - Women's singles: (Italy) Evelin Lanthaler
  - Men's doubles: Italy (Patrick Pigneter & Florian Clara)
- February 14 – 16: NTLWC #6 (final) in (Austria) Umhausen
  - Men's singles: (Italy) Patrick Pigneter
  - Women's singles: (Italy) Evelin Lanthaler
  - Men's doubles: Russia (Pavel Porshnev & Ivan Lazarev)

== Speed skating ==
=== 2018–19 ISU Speed Skating World Cup ===
- November 16 – 18, 2018: SSWC #1 in Obihiro
  - Men's 500 m winners: (Norway) Håvard Holmefjord Lorentzen (#1) / (Russia) Pavel Kulizhnikov (#2)
  - Women's 500 m winner: (Japan) Nao Kodaira (2 times)
  - 1000 m winners: (Russia) Pavel Kulizhnikov (m) / (Austria) Vanessa Herzog (f)
  - 1500 m winners: (Russia) Denis Yuskov (m) / (United States) Brittany Bowe (f)
  - Men's 5000 m winner: (Netherlands) Patrick Roest
  - Women's 3000 m winner: (Netherlands) Esmee Visser
  - Men's team pursuit winners: Russia (Aleksandr Rumyantsev, Danila Semerikov, Sergey Trofimov, & Ruslan Zakharov)
  - Women's team pursuit winners: Japan (Miho Takagi, Nana Takagi, Ayano Sato, & Nene Sakai)
  - Men's team sprint winners: Netherlands (Michel Mulder, Hein Otterspeer, Kjeld Nuis, & Kai Verbij)
  - Women's team sprint winners: Russia (Yekaterina Shikhova, Olga Fatkulina, Angelina Golikova, & Daria Kachanova)
  - Mass Start winners: (Italy) Andrea Giovannini (m) / (Japan) Nana Takagi (f)
- November 23 – 25, 2018: SSWC #2 in Tomakomai
  - Men's 500 m winner: (Japan) Tatsuya Shinhama (2 times)
  - Women's 500 m winner: (Japan) Nao Kodaira (2 times)
  - 1000 m winners: (Netherlands) Kjeld Nuis (m) / (Japan) Nao Kodaira (f)
  - 1500 m winners: (Netherlands) Kjeld Nuis (m) / (Netherlands) Ireen Wüst (f)
  - Men's 5000 m winner: (Belgium) Bart Swings
  - Women's 3000 m winner: (Canada) Isabelle Weidemann
  - Men's team pursuit winners: Netherlands (Douwe de Vries, Patrick Roest, Marcel Bosker, & Chris Huizinga)
  - Women's team pursuit winners: Japan (Miho Takagi, Nana Takagi, Ayano Sato, & Nene Sakai)
  - Men's team sprint winners: Russia (Alexey Yesin, Artyom Kuznetsov, Ruslan Murashov, & Viktor Mushtakov)
  - Women's team sprint winners: Netherlands (Janine Smit, Letitia de Jong, Jutta Leerdam, & Femke Beuling)
  - Mass Start winners: (Belarus) Vitaly Mikhailov (m) / (South Korea) Kim Bo-reum (f)
- December 7 – 9, 2018: SSWC #3 in (Poland) Tomaszów Mazowiecki
  - Men's 500 m winner: (Russia) Pavel Kulizhnikov (2 times)
  - Women's 500 m winner: (Austria) Vanessa Herzog (2 times)
  - 1000 m winners: (Russia) Pavel Kulizhnikov (m) / (United States) Brittany Bowe (f)
  - 1500 m winners: (Russia) Denis Yuskov (m) / (Japan) Miho Takagi (f)
  - Men's 10000 m winner: (Netherlands) Marcel Bosker
  - Women's 5000 m winner: (Netherlands) Esmee Visser
  - Men's team pursuit winners: Japan (Ryosuke Tsuchiya, Seitaro Ichinohe, Shane Williamson, & Masahito Obayashi)
  - Women's team pursuit winners: Japan (Miho Takagi, Nana Takagi, & Ayano Sato)
  - Men's team sprint winners: Norway (Håvard Holmefjord Lorentzen, Johann Jørgen Sæves, Henrik Fagerli Rukke, & Bjørn Magnussen)
  - Women's team sprint winners: Japan (Miho Takagi, Ayano Sato, Konami Soga, & Kurumi Inagawa)
- December 14 – 16, 2018: SSWC #4 in (Netherlands) Heerenveen
  - 500 m winners: (Russia) Pavel Kulizhnikov (m) / (Japan) Nao Kodaira (f)
  - 1000 m winners: (Netherlands) Kjeld Nuis (m) / (United States) Brittany Bowe (f)
  - 1500 m winners: (Netherlands) Thomas Krol (m) / (Netherlands) Ireen Wüst (f)
  - Men's 5000 m winner: (Russia) Danila Semerikov
  - Women's 3000 m winner: (Netherlands) Antoinette de Jong
  - Mass Start winners: (South Korea) Um Cheon-ho (m) / (Japan) Nana Takagi (f)
- February 1 – 3: SSWC #5 in (Norway) Hamar
  - Men's 500 m winner: (Russia) Pavel Kulizhnikov (2 times)
  - Women's 500 m winners: (Japan) Nao Kodaira (#1) / (Austria) Vanessa Herzog (#2)
  - 1000 m winners: (Netherlands) Kai Verbij (m) / (United States) Brittany Bowe (f)
  - 1500 m winners: (Russia) Denis Yuskov (m) / (United States) Brittany Bowe (f)
  - Men's 5000 m winner: (Norway) Sverre Lunde Pedersen
  - Women's 3000 m winner: (Czech Republic) Martina Sáblíková
- March 9 & 10: SSWC #6 (final) in (United States) Kearns, Utah
  - Men's 500 m winners: (Russia) Pavel Kulizhnikov (#1) / (Japan) Tatsuya Shinhama (#2)
  - Women's 500 m winner: (Japan) Nao Kodaira (2 times)
  - 1000 m winners: (Netherlands) Kjeld Nuis (m; World Record) / (United States) Brittany Bowe (f; World Record)
  - 1500 m winners: (Netherlands) Kjeld Nuis (m; World Record) / (Japan) Miho Takagi (f; World Record)
  - Men's 5000 m winner: (Netherlands) Patrick Roest
  - Women's 3000 m winner: (Czech Republic) Martina Sáblíková (World Record)
  - Mass Start winners: (Japan) Ryosuke Tsuchiya (m) / (Netherlands) Irene Schouten (f)

=== Other long track speed skating events ===
- January 11 – 13: 2019 European Speed Skating Championships in (Italy) Collalbo
  - All-Around 500 m winners: (Latvia) Haralds Silovs (m) / (Netherlands) Antoinette de Jong (f)
  - All-Around 1500 m winners: (Netherlands) Sven Kramer (m) / (Netherlands) Antoinette de Jong (f)
  - All-Around 5000 m winners: (Netherlands) Sven Kramer (m) / (Czech Republic) Martina Sáblíková (f)
  - All-Around Men's 10000 m winner: (Netherlands) Patrick Roest
  - All-Around Women's 3000 m winner: (Netherlands) Antoinette de Jong
  - Men's Sprint 500 m winner: (Netherlands) Kai Verbij (2 times)
  - Men's Sprint 1000 m winners: (Netherlands) Kai Verbij (#1) / (Netherlands) Thomas Krol (#2)
  - Women's Sprint 500 m winner: (Austria) Vanessa Herzog (2 times)
  - Women's Sprint 1000 m winner: (Russia) Daria Kachanova (2 times)
- February 7 – 10: 2019 World Single Distance Speed Skating Championships in (Germany) Inzell
  - 500 m winners: (Russia) Ruslan Murashov (m) / (Austria) Vanessa Herzog (f)
  - 1000 m winners: (Netherlands) Kai Verbij (m) / (United States) Brittany Bowe (f)
  - 1500 m winners: (Netherlands) Thomas Krol (m) / (Netherlands) Ireen Wüst (f)
  - 5000 m winners: (Norway) Sverre Lunde Pedersen (m) / (Czech Republic) Martina Sáblíková (f)
  - Men's 10000 m winner: (Netherlands) Jorrit Bergsma
  - Women's 3000 m winner: (Czech Republic) Martina Sáblíková
  - Men's Team Sprint winners: Netherlands (Ronald Mulder, Kjeld Nuis, Kai Verbij, & Thomas Krol)
  - Women's Team Sprint winners: Netherlands (Janine Smit, Letitia de Jong, Sanneke de Neeling, & Jutta Leerdam)
  - Men's Team Pursuit winners: Netherlands (Sven Kramer, Douwe de Vries, Marcel Bosker, & Chris Huizinga)
  - Women's Team Pursuit winners: Japan (Miho Takagi, Nana Takagi, Ayano Sato, & Nene Sakai)
  - Mass Start winners: (United States) Joey Mantia (m) / (Netherlands) Irene Schouten (f)
- February 23 & 24: 2019 World Sprint Speed Skating Championships in (Netherlands) Heerenveen
  - Men's 500 m winners: (Japan) Tatsuya Shinhama (#1) / (Russia) Pavel Kulizhnikov (#2)
  - Women's 500 m winner: (Japan) Nao Kodaira (2 times)
  - Men's 1000 m winner: (Netherlands) Kjeld Nuis (2 times)
  - Women's 1000 m winners: (United States) Brittany Bowe (#1) / (Japan) Miho Takagi (#2)
- March 2 & 3: 2019 World Allround Speed Skating Championships in (Canada) Calgary
  - 500 m winners: (Canada) Antoine Gélinas-Beaulieu (m) / (Japan) Miho Takagi (f)
  - 1500 m winners: (Norway) Sverre Lunde Pedersen (m) / (Japan) Miho Takagi (f)
  - 5000 m winners: (Netherlands) Patrick Roest (m) / (Czech Republic) Martina Sáblíková (f)
  - Men's 10000 m winner: (Netherlands) Patrick Roest
  - Women's 3000 m winner: (Czech Republic) Martina Sáblíková (World Record)

=== 2018–19 ISU Short Track Speed Skating World Cup ===
- November 2 – 4, 2018: STWC #1 in (Canada) Calgary
  - Men's 500 m winner: (China) Wu Dajing (2 times)
  - Women's 500 m winners: (Poland) Natalia Maliszewska (#1) / (Netherlands) Lara van Ruijven (#2)
  - 1000 m winners: (Hungary) Shaoang Liu (m) / (Netherlands) Suzanne Schulting (f)
  - 1500 m winners: (Japan) Kazuki Yoshinaga (m) / (Netherlands) Suzanne Schulting (f)
  - Men's 5000 m Relay winners: Hungary (Cole William Isaac Krueger, Csaba Burján, Shaoang Liu, & Shaolin Sándor Liu) (World Record)
  - Women's 3000 m Relay winners: Russia (Ekaterina Efremenkova, Ekaterina Konstantinova, Emina Malagich, & Sofia Prosvirnova)
  - Mixed Relay winners: China (Fan Kexin, Li Jinyu, Ren Ziwei, & Wu Dajing)
- November 9 – 11, 2018: STWC #2 in (United States) Salt Lake City
  - 500 m winners: (China) Wu Dajing (m) / (Poland) Natalia Maliszewska (f)
  - 1000 m #1 winners: (Hungary) Shaolin Sándor Liu (m) / (Netherlands) Suzanne Schulting (f)
  - 1000 m #2 winners: (South Korea) HONG Kyung-hwan (m) / (Canada) Alyson Charles (f)
  - 1500 m winners: (Netherlands) Sjinkie Knegt (m) / (South Korea) Choi Min-jeong (f)
  - Men's 5000 m Relay winners: Hungary (Csaba Burján, Shaoang Liu, Shaolin Sándor Liu, & Alex Varnyu)
  - Women's 3000 m Relay winners: South Korea (Choi Ji-hyun, Choi Min-jeong, KIM Ji-yoo, & Noh Ah-reum)
  - Mixed Relay winners: Hungary (Sára Bácskai, Petra Jászapáti, Shaoang Liu, & Shaolin Sándor Liu)
- December 7 – 9, 2018: STWC #3 in (Kazakhstan) Almaty
  - 500 m winners: (Canada) Samuel Girard (m) / (Hungary) Petra Jászapáti (f)
  - 1000 m winners: (Hungary) Shaoang Liu (m) / (Netherlands) Suzanne Schulting (f)
  - Men's 1500 m winners: (South Korea) Lim Hyo-jun (#1) / (South Korea) KIM Gun-woo (#2)
  - Women's 1500 m winners: (South Korea) KIM Geon-hee (#1) / (South Korea) Choi Min-jeong (#2)
  - Men's 5000 m Relay winners: Netherlands (Daan Breeuwsma, Itzhak de Laat, Sjinkie Knegt, & Dennis Visser)
  - Women's 3000 m Relay winners: Netherlands (Rianne de Vries, Suzanne Schulting, Yara van Kerkhof, & Lara van Ruijven)
  - Mixed Relay winners: Canada (Cedrik Blais, Kim Boutin, Alyson Charles, & Samuel Girard)
- February 1 – 3: STWC #4 in (Germany) Dresden
  - 500 m winners: (South Korea) Lim Hyo-jun (m) / (Italy) Martina Valcepina (f)
  - 1500 m winners: (South Korea) KIM Gun-woo (m) / (South Korea) KIM Ji-yoo (f)
  - Men's 1000 m winners: (South Korea) Hwang Dae-heon (#1) / (South Korea) PARK Ji-won (#2)
  - Women's 1000 m winners: (Russia) Sofia Prosvirnova (#1) / (Netherlands) Suzanne Schulting (#2)
  - Men's 5000 m Relay winners: Canada (Charle Cournoyer, Charles Hamelin, Pascal Dion, & Samuel Girard)
  - Women's 3000 m Relay winners: Russia (Ekaterina Efremenkova, Ekaterina Konstantinova, Emina Malagich, & Sofia Prosvirnova)
  - Mixed Relay winners: Russia (Aleksandr Shulginov, Ekaterina Efremenkova, Semion Elistratov, & Sofia Prosvirnova)
- February 8 – 10: STWC #5 (final) in (Italy) Turin
  - Men's 500 m winners: (South Korea) Hwang Dae-heon (#1) / (South Korea) Lim Hyo-jun (#2)
  - Women's 500 m winner: (Italy) Martina Valcepina (2 times)
  - 1000 m winners: (South Korea) Hwang Dae-heon (m) / (Canada) Kim Boutin (f)
  - 1500 m winners: (South Korea) KIM Gun-woo (m) / (Netherlands) Suzanne Schulting (f)
  - Men's 5000 m Relay winners: Russia (Denis Ayrapetyan, Semion Elistratov, Aleksandr Shulginov, & Pavel Sitnikov)
  - Women's 3000 m Relay winners: Netherlands (Rianne de Vries, Suzanne Schulting, Yara van Kerkhof, & Lara van Ruijven)
  - Mixed Relay winners: Russia (Ekaterina Efremenkova, Semion Elistratov, Pavel Sitnikov, & Evgeniya Zakharova)

=== Other short track speed skating events ===
- January 11 – 13: 2019 European Short Track Speed Skating Championships in Dordrecht
  - Overall Classification winners: (Hungary) Shaolin Sándor Liu (m) / (Netherlands) Suzanne Schulting (f)
  - 500 m winners: (Hungary) Shaoang Liu (m) / (Poland) Natalia Maliszewska (f)
  - 1000 m winners: (Russia) Semion Elistratov (m) / (Russia) Sofia Prosvirnova (f)
  - 1500 m winners: (Hungary) Shaolin Sándor Liu (m) / (Netherlands) Suzanne Schulting (f)
  - 3000 m SF winners: (Italy) Yuri Confortola (m) / (Netherlands) Suzanne Schulting (f)
  - Men's 5000 m Relay winners: Hungary (Csaba Burján, Cole William Isaac Krueger, Shaoang Liu, & Shaolin Sándor Liu)
  - Women's 3000 m Relay winners: Netherlands (Rianne de Vries, Suzanne Schulting, Yara van Kerkhof, & Lara van Ruijven)
- March 8 – 10: 2019 World Short Track Speed Skating Championships in (Bulgaria) Sofia
  - Overall Classification winners: (South Korea) Lim Hyo-jun (m) / (Netherlands) Suzanne Schulting (f)
  - 500 m winners: (South Korea) Hwang Dae-heon (m) / (Netherlands) Lara van Ruijven (f)
  - 1000 m winners: (South Korea) Lim Hyo-jun (m) / (Netherlands) Suzanne Schulting (f)
  - 1500 m winners: (South Korea) Lim Hyo-jun (m) / (South Korea) Choi Min-jeong (f)
  - 3000 m Superfinal winners: (South Korea) Lim Hyo-jun (m) / (Netherlands) Suzanne Schulting (f)
  - Men's 5000 m Relay winners: South Korea (Hwang Dae-heon, Lee June-seo, Lim Hyo-jun, & PARK Ji-won)
  - Women's 3000 m Relay winners: South Korea (Choi Min-jeong, KIM Geon-hee, KIM Ji-yoo, & Shim Suk-hee)

== See also ==
- 2019 in skiing
- 2019 in sports
