= Laives =

Laives Leifers
- Comune
- Comune di Laives; Gemeinde Leifers
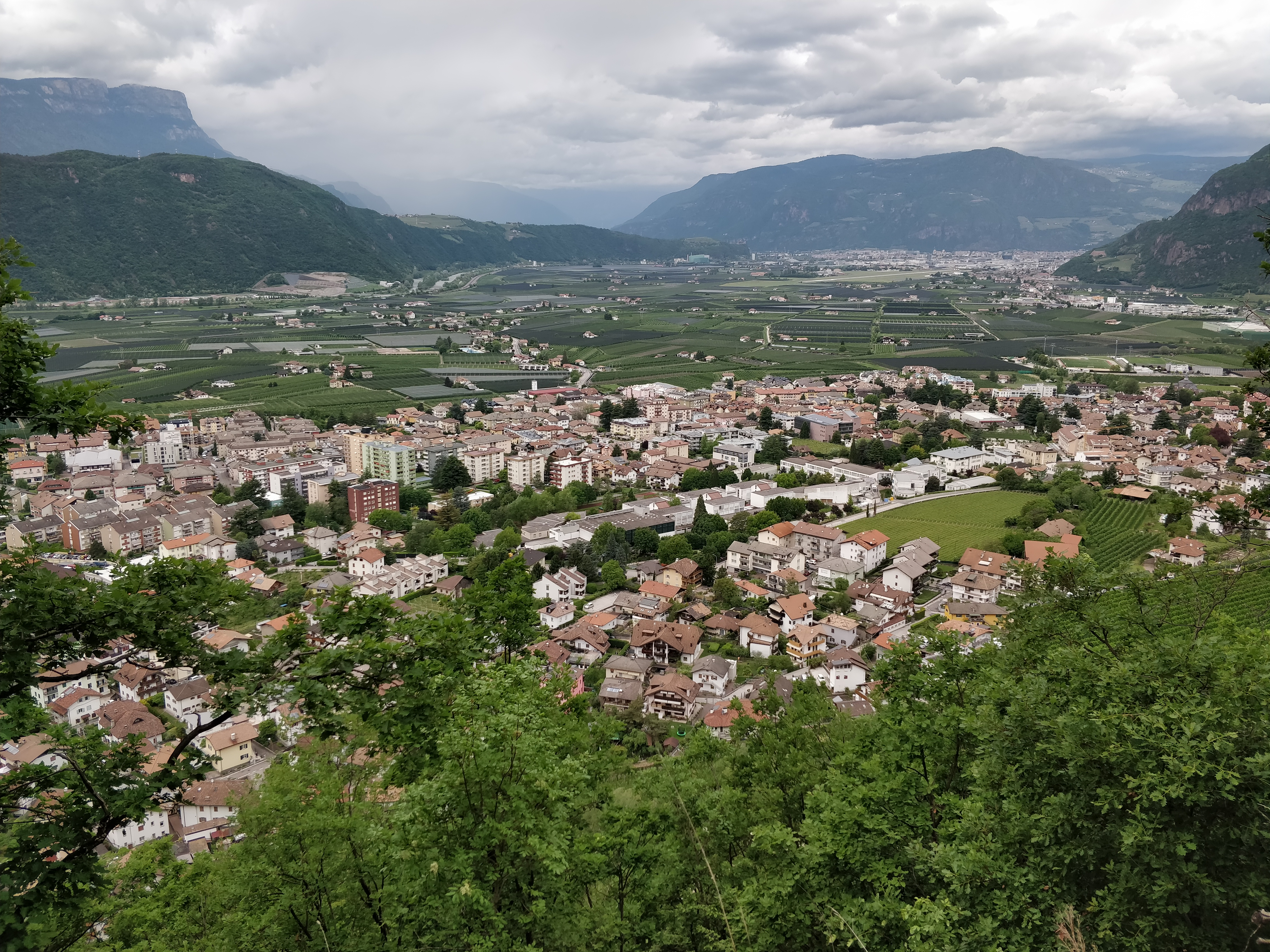
- Panorama of Laives.

- Flag Coat of arms

- Location within Italy Location within Trentino-Alto Adige/Südtirol
- Coordinates: 46°26′N 11°20′E
- Country: Italy
- Region: Trentino-Alto Adige/Südtirol
- Province: South Tyrol (BZ)
- Frazioni: Pineta (Steinmannwald), La Costa (Seit), San Giacomo (St. Jakob)

Government
  - Mayor: Giovanni Seppi (SVP)

Area
  - Total: 24.3 km^{2} (9.4 sq mi)
- Elevation: 258 m (846 ft)

Population (Nov. 2010)
  - Total: 17,168
  - Density: 707/km^{2} (1,830/sq mi)
- Demonym(s): Italian: Laivesotti; German: Leiferer
- Time zone: UTC+1 (CET)
  - Summer (DST): UTC+2 (CEST)
- Postal code: 39055
- Dialing code: 0471
- Website: Official website

Laives (Italian: [ˈlaives]), also known as Leifers (German: [ˈlaɪfɐs]), is a town and a comune (municipality) in the province of South Tyrol in northern Italy. It is located about 8 kilometres (5 mi) south of the city of Bolzano. Laives is one of only six mainly Italian-speaking municipalities in South Tyrol, and is the fourth-largest municipality in the province.

The town's main language fluctuated severely in the 19th and 20th centuries as part of Austria-Hungary and then the Kingdom of Italy. (Note: See History) Laives' population is noted as being especially proficient in both Italian and German linguistic codes. (Note: See Society)

== Names ==
The town was first mentioned as Leiuers in 1237.

As it is more than 70% Italian-speaking, the town is usually known in English by its Italian name, Laives. It is also known by its German-language name, Leifers; South Tyrol is mainly German-speaking. The municipality is officially bilingual in Italian and German.

== Geography ==
As of 30 November 2010, Laives had a population of 17,168 and an area of 24.3 square kilometres (9.4 mi^{2}).

=== Subdivisions ===
The municipality contains four urban centers:

- Laives (Leifers)
- Pineta (Steinmannwald)
- San Giacomo (St. Jakob)
- La Costa (Seit)

Laives is the seat of the town hall, Pineta and San Giacomo are two frazioni (hamlets), while La Costa is – according to the municipal statute – a località (inhabited locality), but it is often referred to as a frazione also in the official documentation. The Brantental valley connects it with Deutschnofen.

== History ==
Laives' population was highly affected by political changes in the Austro-Hungarian Empire and, after World War I, by the Italianization of South Tyrol.

In 1890, Peterlini records that the town had a slight majority of Italian-speakers (937) compared to German-speakers (873). Rapid population changes in the Austro-Hungarian Empire caused Laives/Leifers in 1910 to have far more German-speakers (2,583) than Italian- and Ladin-speakers (361). (Note: Oskar Peterlini suggests that this was due to processes of migration and cultural assimilation; the historian Mario Toscano suggests that a form of conservative political oppression took place, due to the Austrian authorities' hostility to political ideas relating to the French Revolution, while the Italian population was more enthusiastic about them.)

After World War I, South Tyrol became part of the Kingdom of Italy. A 1923 order by the fascist government led to the province's forced Italianization including through migration, particularly in areas around Bolzano. After World War II, Italian-speakers comprised 75% of Laives' population by 1971.

=== Coat-of-arms ===
The emblem consists of an argent pile, with concave sides on azure and a chapel on a mountain of gules. The sign, similar to that of the Counts of Lichtenstein who lived in the castle on Mount Francesco, represents the Saint Peter chapel. The emblem was adopted in 1970.

== Society ==
Laives has had the youngest population for a town in South Tyrol since 1985, and the municiplity has had some of the province's largest population increases.

=== Linguistic distribution ===
According to the 2024 census, 74.47% of the town's population speak Italian, 25.16% German and 0.36% Ladin as first language.

The complex linguistic history of Laives has caused the traditional population there (and in Salorno) to be especially adept at code-switching, according to the linguist Silvia Dal Negro. Locals have traditionally been fluent in four dialects: standard Italian, German, the South Tyrolean dialect of German, and the Italian Trentino dialect. The Trentino dialect's presence has weakened with the arrival from Bolzano of Italian-speakers who do not use that dialect; "paradoxically, the Trentino dialect is currently still part of the repertoire of the [German-identifying] community". Due to population shifts, this linguistic repertoire is expected to become more simplified.

| Language | 2001 | 2011 | 2024 |
|---|---|---|---|
| German | 29.07% | 27.99% | 25.16% |
| Italian | 70.42% | 71.50% | 74.47% |
| Ladin | 0.51% | 0.51% | 0.36% |

== Culture ==
The Carnival of Laives is one of the most important carnivals in Trentino-South Tyrol.

The city is also the headquarters of the Coro Monti Pallidi, an all-male a cappella chorus founded in 1967 by Sergio Maccagnan and conducted since 2004 by Paolo Maccagnan.

== Notable people ==
- Reinhard Dallinger (born 1950 in Laives), a retired zoologist and Professor of zoology and ecotoxicology
