= Hermann Stuppner =

Pharmacognosist and professor

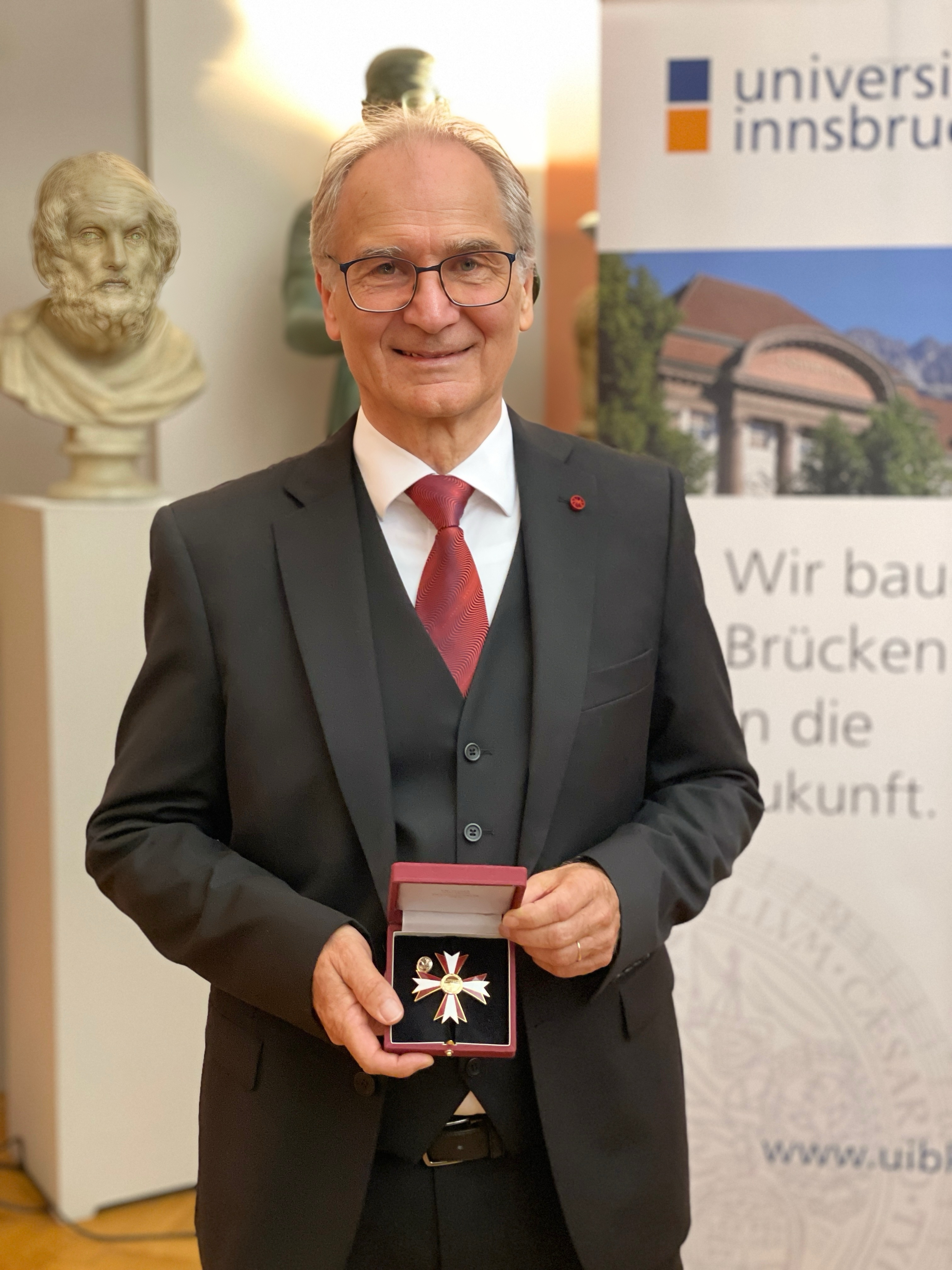
- Hermann Stuppner receiving the Austrian Decoration for Science and Art (2023)
- Born: 1957 (age 68–69); Deutschnofen, South Tyrol, Italy
- Education: University of Innsbruck; LMU Munich
- Awards: Austrian Cross of Honour for Science and Art, First Class
- Scientific career
- Fields: Pharmacognosy, natural product chemistry
- Institutions: University of Innsbruck

Hermann Stuppner (born 1957) is a pharmacognosist and retired professor of pharmacognosy at the University of Innsbruck. His research has focused on medicinal plants, natural products, and herbal medicines. Among the plant species associated with his work is Edelweiss. In 2022, he was awarded the Austrian Cross of Honour for Science and Art, First Class.

== Early life and education ==
Stuppner was born in Deutschnofen in South Tyrol. He attended the Franciscan Gymnasium in Bolzano and studied pharmacy at the University of Innsbruck from 1976 to 1982. In 1983, he completed the Italian state examination for the pharmacy profession at the University of Padua. He received a doctorate in pharmaceutical biology from LMU Munich in 1985.

== Career ==
After his doctorate, Stuppner worked as a postdoctoral researcher at the University of California, Irvine before returning to Austria in 1987. He joined the University of Innsbruck in 1987, completed his habilitation in 1993, and was appointed professor of pharmacognosy in 2001. He retired in 2022.

From 2004 to 2022, Stuppner worked as dean of studies for the Faculty of Chemistry and Pharmacy at Innsbruck. Since 2006, he has worked as president of the Herbal Medicinal Products Platform Austria (HMPPA).

== Research ==
Stuppner's research has included the isolation and structural elucidation of plant secondary metabolites, the analysis and quality assessment of medicinal plants, and the study of herbal medicines. His work on edelweiss has included leoligin and other compounds from the plant that have been investigated for possible medicinal uses.

== Awards and honours ==
In 2013, a University of Innsbruck team led by Stuppner was among the projects recognised at the Houska Prize for research carried out with Bionorica Research. In 2017, he was one of the recipients of the Wissenschaftspreis der Stiftung Südtiroler Sparkasse. In 2022, the President of Austria awarded him the Austrian Cross of Honour for Science and Art, First Class.
