= Indonesia Ice Hockey Federation =

- Federasi Hoki Es Indonesia
- Sport: Ice Hockey
- Jurisdiction: National
- Abbreviation: FHEI
- Founded: 20 May 2016; 10 years ago
- Affiliation: IIHF
- Affiliation date: 20 May 2016; 10 years ago
- Headquarters: Jakarta
- Location: Indonesia
- President: Ronald Situmeang
- Secretary: Wiwin Darmawan Salim

Official website
- www.fhei.co.id
- (Indonesia)

The Indonesia Ice Hockey Federation (Indonesian: Federasi Hoki Es Indonesia; abbreviated as FHEI) is the governing body of ice hockey in Indonesia. The federation joined the International Ice Hockey Federation (IIHF) as an associate member on May 20, 2016.

== History ==
The Indonesian Ice Hockey Federation (FHEI) is the national ice hockey sports organization in Indonesia. FHEI has been registered as a member of the International Ice Hockey Federation (IIHF), an international body that oversees the sport of ice hockey and the Indonesian Olympic Committee (KOI).

This sport grew and developed in Indonesia, starting with the introduction of inline skating in the 90s. Not long after inline skating became popular in society, the era of inline hockey began. This is marked by the many exhibition events held up to national level championships.

FHEI Journey Ice Hockey itself has a similar story, this sport became known to the public when Indonesia first had an ice rink located in a shopping area in Jakarta in 2001 and now there are several more ice rinks located in several states.

The development of ice hockey in Indonesia over the last 2 decades has provided a new color for the growth of ice hockey in Asia. Indonesia is starting to become known internationally as one of the countries in Southeast Asia with a tropical climate that participates in sports that were previously only played by countries with winter seasons.

== Programs ==
In running its organization, FHEI follows directions from the IIHF which requires its members to roll out competitions such as ice hockey leagues (Indonesia Ice Hockey League – IIHL), international tournaments ( Indonesia Invitational Ice Hockey Tournament – IIHT), as well as several other programs such as the introduction of hockey. ice among children ( Hockey Intro to Children ) in collaboration with schools, youth development programs ( Youth Development Program ), and referee development and certification programs (Officiating Development Program).

=== National teams ===
FHEI also produces a national ice hockey team that takes part in annual tournaments organized by the IIHF or International Olympic Committee (IOC). The Indonesian National Ice Hockey Team (Indonesian: Tim Nasional Hoki Es Indonesia) is an associate member of the International Ice Hockey Federation (IIHF). The team and have not entered in any World Championship tournaments or at any Olympic Games, but have played in Asian Winter Games, Challenge Cup of Asia & Southeast Asian Games in Men’s and U20 tournaments. Currently, FHEI controls the men's senior and under-20 national teams.

- Indonesia men's national ice hockey team
- Indonesia men's national junior ice hockey team (under-20)

The senior national team was first launched in 2016 in order to compete at the 2017 Asian Winter Games in Sapporo, Japan. They made its debut in the Second Division of the competition, hence its debut in international competitions.

Indonesia won Bronze at the 2018 Challenge Cup of Asia Division I in Kuala Lumpur, Malaysia, 24–29 March 2018 and at the 2019 IIHF Ice Hockey U20 Challenge Cup of Asia Division I in Kuala Lumpur, Malaysia, 3–6 December 2018.

=== Leagues ===
FHEI organizes domestic ice hockey competition in Indonesia, namely Indonesia Ice Hockey League (IIHL).

- Indonesia Ice Hockey League
- Indonesia Ice Hockey League – Junior
- Indonesia Ice Hockey League – Youth
- Indonesia Ice Hockey Tournament

== Indonesian participation ==
Year	Event	Host nation	Date	Result
2023	World Championships	Mongolia	23–26 March 2023	55th place (4th in Division IV)
2019	Men U20 Challenge Cup Of Asia	Malaysia	3–6 December 2018	7th place (3rd in Division I)
2019	Southeast Asian Games	Philippines	1–8 December 2019	5th place
2019	Men CCOA	Malaysia	1–9 March 2019	5th place
2018	Men Challenge Cup Of Asia	Malaysia	24–29 March 2018	8th place (3rd in Division I)
2017	Southeast Asian Games	Malaysia	20–24 August 2017	5th place
2017	Asian Winter Games	Japan	18–26 February 2017	18th place (8th in Division II)

== FHEI stats ==
Member Since	20 May 2016
Total Players	139
Men's World Ranking	58 (new)
Women's World Ranking	—N/a
Male Players	70
Female Players	12
Junior Players	50
Total Referees	5
Indoor Rinks	10
Outdoor Rinks	—N/a
President	Ronald Situmeang
Membership	Associate Member
