= Coro Monti Pallidi =

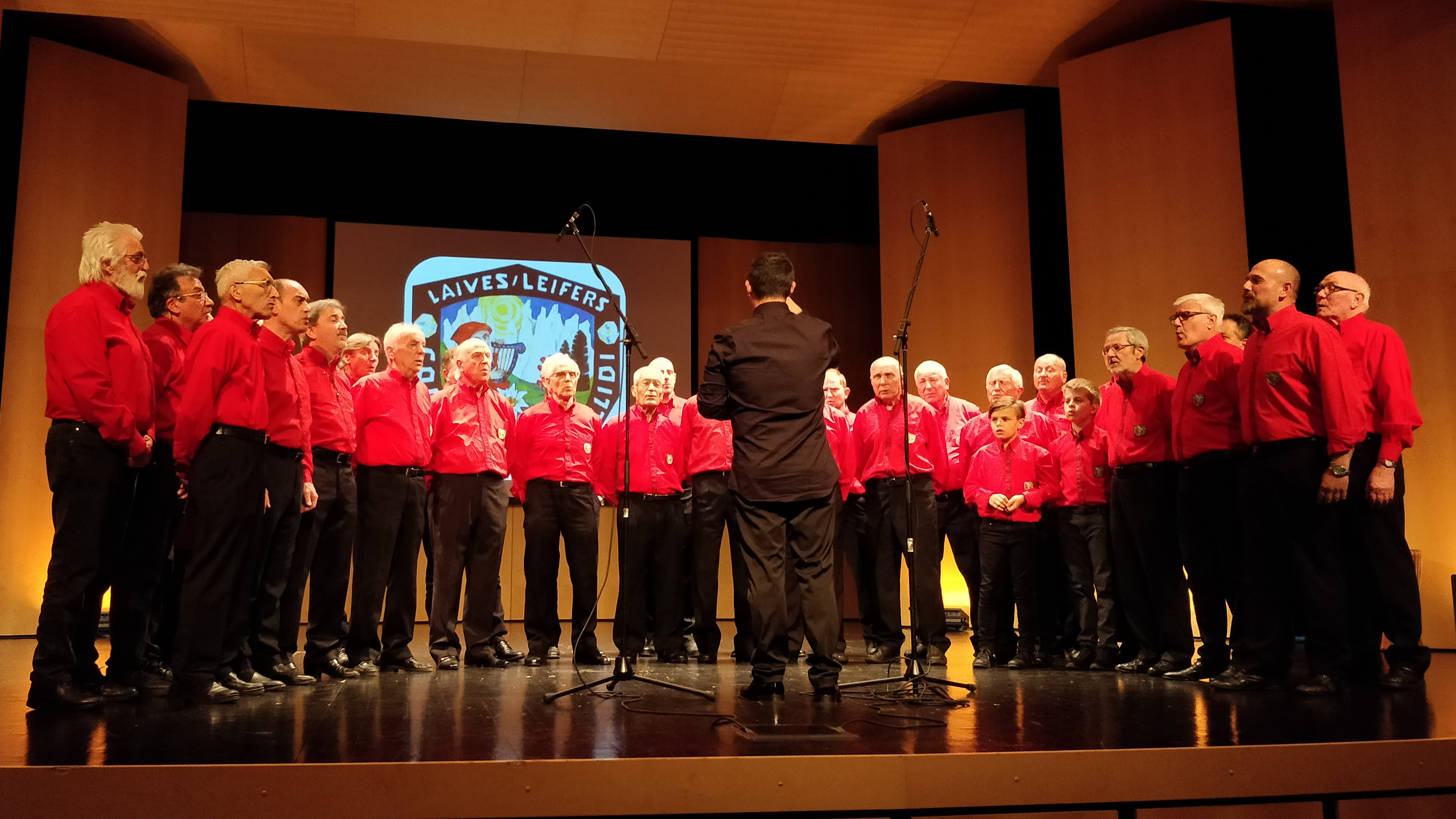

Background information
- Origin: Laives, Italy
- Genres: Choral, popular, a cappella, Alpini songs
- Occupation: Men's choir
- Instrument: voices
- Years active: 1967–present
- Website: apsmontipallidi.it

The Coro Monti Pallidi is an Italian all-men a cappella chorus from Laives (Italy).

== History ==
The choir was founded in Auer, South Tyrol in 1967 by a group of music student, conducted by the maestro Sergio Maccagnan; the first headquarters of the choir was a church in Bronzolo, but very soon they moved to Laives.

In 2005 Paolo Maccagnan, son of Sergio, took over from his father in the conduction of the choir.

The repertoire ranges over from Alpini songs to spirituals, from typical Italian popular/traditional music to sacred music.

== Discography ==
- 1976 – Quatro cavai che trota
- 1986 – ...dai Monti Pallidi...
- 1990 – Coro Monti Pallidi
- 2004 – Voce da una valle
- 2006 – Stille Nacht
- 2007 – 40 anni di musica
- 2018 – Lis Montes Pàljes
