= Brantental =

Valley in South Tyrol, Italy

Coordinates: 46°24′54″N 11°22′10″E

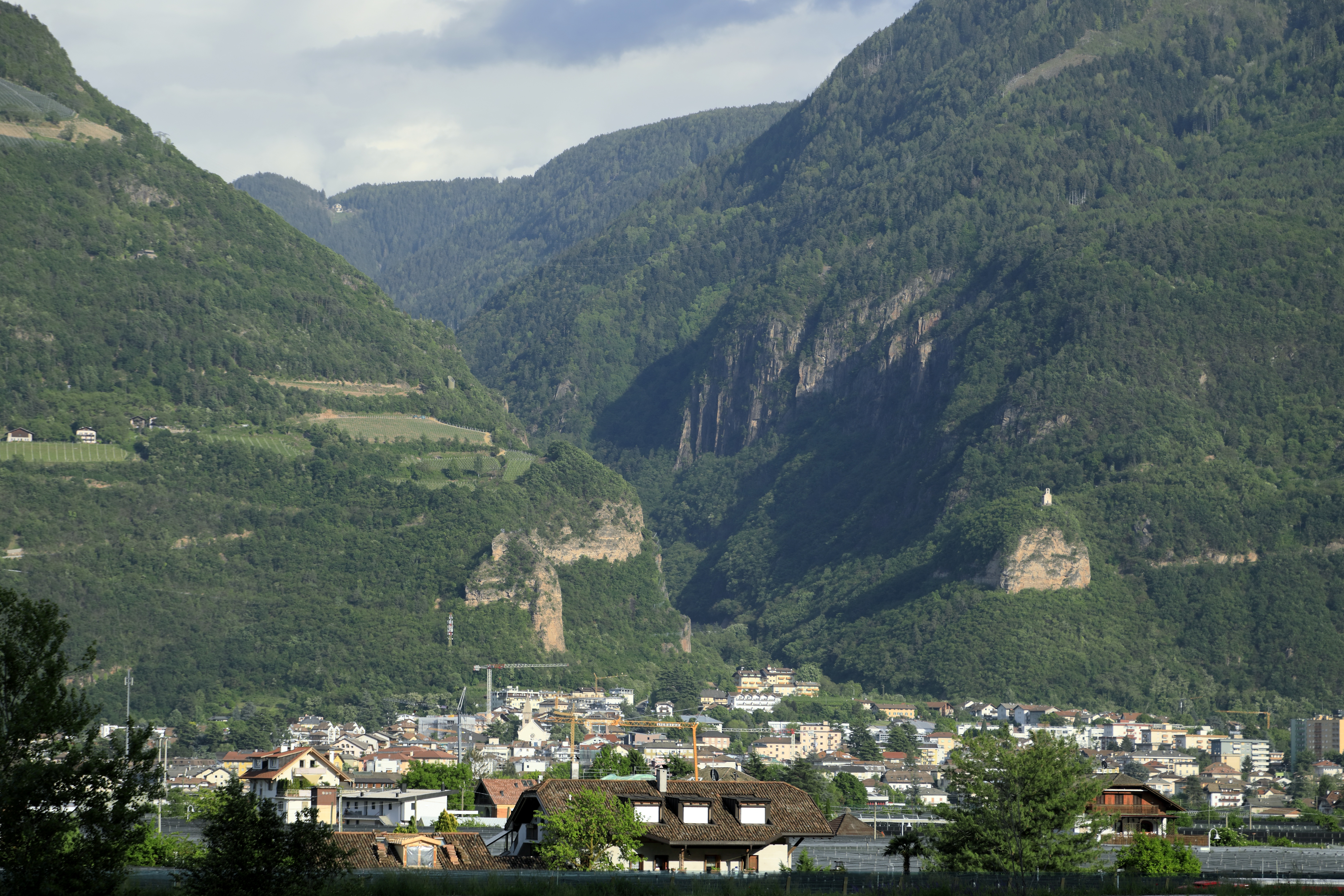

The Brantental, also Brandental, is a valley in South Tyrol, Italy, stretching from Laives to Deutschnofen.
