= Obereggen =

Mountain Village in South Tyrol, Italy

Coordinates: 46°23′06″N 11°31′32″E

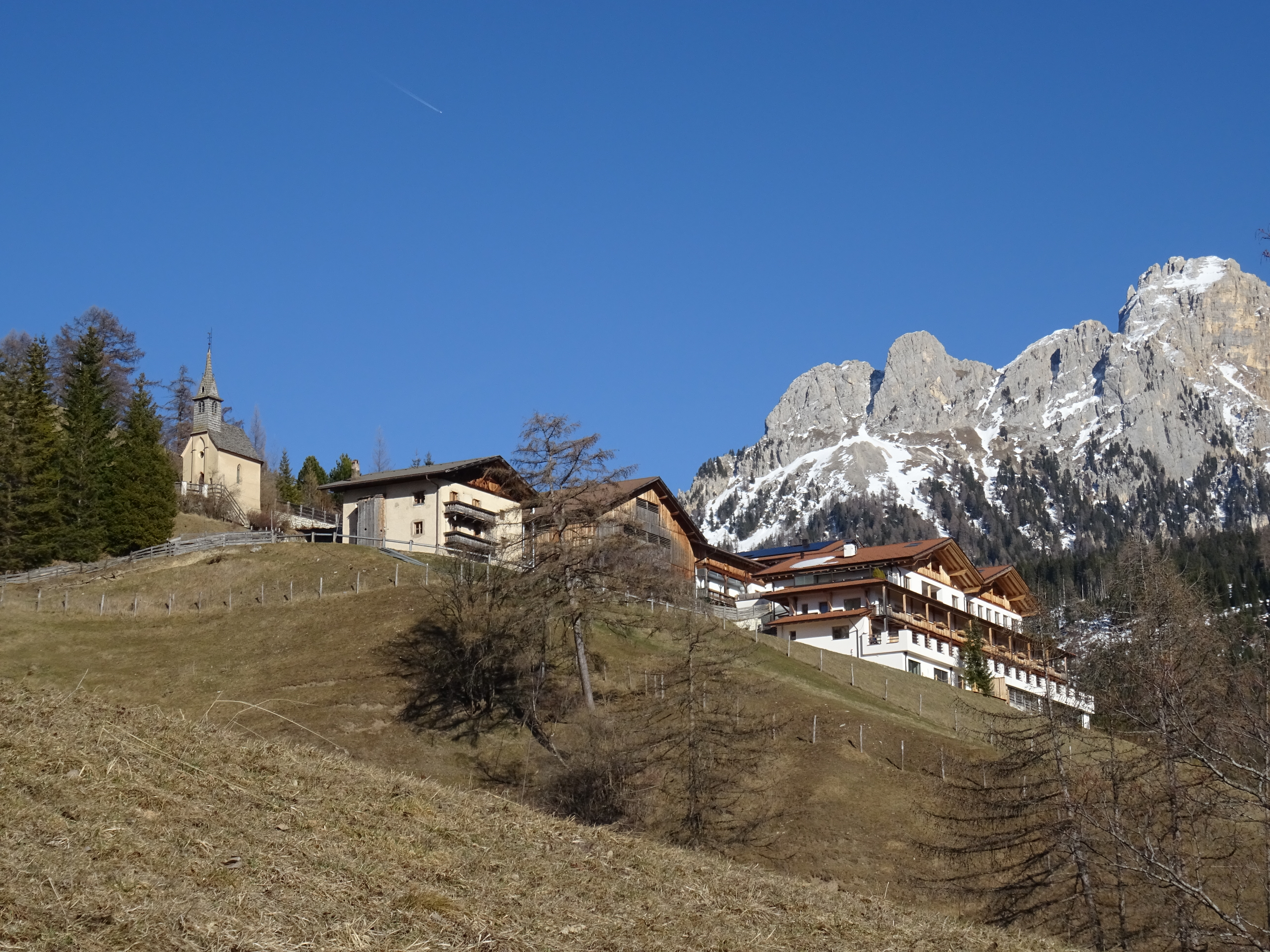
Obereggen

Obereggen is a mountain village in South Tyrol, northern Italy. It is situated at the foot of the Latemar and known as a ski resort. Obereggen is part of the frazione St. Nikolaus/Eggen of the comune (municipality) of Deutschnofen.
