= Mongolia men's national junior ice hockey team =

- Association: Mongolian Ice Hockey Federation
- Head coach: Mergen Arslan
- Assistants: Batbold Munkhbayar
- Captain: Phandaj Khuhakaew
- Team colors
- IIHF code: MGL

First international
- Thailand 14–1 Mongolia (Kuala Lumpur, Malaysia; 3 December 2018)

Biggest win
- Kuwait 2–9 Mongolia (Kuala Lumpur, Malaysia; 4 December 2018)

Biggest defeat
- Thailand 14–1 Mongolia (Kuala Lumpur, Malaysia; 3 December 2018)

IIHF U20 Challenge Cup of Asia Division I
- Appearances: 1 (first in 2019)
- Best result: 2nd (2019)

International record (W–L–T)
- 2–1–0

The Mongolia men's national junior ice hockey team is the men's national under-20 ice hockey team of Mongolia. The team is controlled by the Mongolian Ice Hockey Federation, a member of the International Ice Hockey Federation. The team made its international debut in December 2018 at the 2019 IIHF U20 Challenge Cup of Asia Division I tournament which it went on to finish second.

== History ==
The Mongolia men's national junior ice hockey team debuted at the 2019 IIHF U20 Challenge Cup of Asia Division I tournament in Kuala Lumpur, Malaysia. Their opening game of the tournament was against Thailand which they lost 1–14, and is also currently their largest loss in international competition. Mongolia went on to win their other two games against Indonesia and Kuwait, finishing the tournament in second. Their 9–2 win against Kuwait is currently their biggest win in international competition. Forward Davaasuren Boldbaatar was selected as the best Mongolian player of the tournament.

== International competitions ==
- 2019 IIHF U20 Challenge Cup of Asia Division I. Finish: 2nd

== Players and personnel ==
=== Roster ===
From the team's most recent tournament

#	Name	Pos	S/G	Age	Club
2	Orgilbat Amarsanaa	D	R	26 April 2004	Zolboot
28	Enkhbat Batbaatar (A)	F	L	28 April 2002	Sharingol
6	Galsanbayar Batjargal	D	L	1 October 1999	Khangarid
17	Davaasuren Boldbaatar	F	L	23 July 2001	
18	Uugan-erdene Bold-Erdene (C)	F	R	19 March 2002	Khangarid
1	Batbayajikh Bolormaa	G	L	7 February 2000	Zolboot
19	Sumiyabazar Byambajav	F	R	10 September 2001	Khangarid
5	Tuvdendorj Davaadorj	F	L	28 October 2001	Darkhan
12	Tuguldur Erdenesuvd	D	L	13 April 1999	Otgon Od
15	Munkhtulga Ganbaatar	F	L	28 October 2000	Sharingol
8	Khongor Ganbileg	F	L	14 September 1999	Darkhan
38	Baasandorj Lkhagvanyam	G	L	7 November 2003	Khangarid
4	Batbaatar Munkhbayar	D	R	8 January 2002	Zolboot
10	Tamir Ochirbat (A)	F	L	8 June 1999	Darkhan
9	Dulguun Shinetsetseg	F	L	6 November 2001	Otgon Od
11	Nyamdavaa Urtnasan	F	R	25 November 2001	Otgon Od
22	Ankhbayar Uugansuren	D	L	6 July 2000	Otgon Od

=== 2019 ===
All times are local. (MST – UTC+8)

3 December 2018; 17:30	Mongolia	1–14 (1–2, 0–5, 0–7)	Thailand	MyNISS; Attendance: 142

Game reference
10 min	Penalties	26 min
14	Shots	63

4 December 2018; 21:00	Kuwait	2–9 (0–2, 1–3, 1–4)	Mongolia	MyNISS; Attendance: 260

Game reference
10 min	Penalties	10 min
15	Shots	57

6 December 2018; 17:00	Indonesia	1–3 (0–3, 1–0, 0–0)	Mongolia	MyNISS; Attendance: 133

Game reference
8 min	Penalties	6 min
16	Shots	39

=== Team staff ===
From the team's most recent tournament

- Head coach: Mergen Arslan
- Assistant coach: Batbold Munkhbayar
- Team leader: Javkhlan Bold
- Equipment manager: Amarsanaa Dovdon
- Doctor: Enkhtaivan Khoonogdoi
- Video coach: Temuujin Mergen
