= Thailand men's national junior ice hockey team =

- Association: Ice Hockey Association of Thailand
- General manager: Pongsaya Hongswadhi
- Head coach: Juhani Ijas
- Assistants: Ken Edvin Kindborn
- Captain: Phandaj Khuhakaew
- Team colors
- IIHF code: THA

First international
- Thailand 14–1 Mongolia (Kuala Lumpur, Malaysia; 3 December 2018)

Biggest win
- Thailand 28–0 United Arab Emirates (Bangkok, Thailand; 28 June 2022)

Biggest defeat
- Turkey 10–1 Thailand (Sofia, Bulgaria; 19 January 2026)

IIHF World Junior Championship
- Appearances: 2 (first in 2025)
- Best result: 39th (2026)

IIHF U20 Asia and Oceania Championship
- Appearances: 2 (first in 2019)
- Best result: 1st (2022)

International record (W–L–T)
- 10–4–0

Medal record

U20 Asia and Oceania Championship
Gold medal – first place	2019 Kuala Lumpur	Division I
Gold medal – first place	2022 Bangkok	

The Thailand men's national junior ice hockey team is the men's national under-20 ice hockey team of Thailand. The team is controlled by the Ice Hockey Association of Thailand, a member of the International Ice Hockey Federation. The team made its international debut in December 2018 at the 2019 IIHF U20 Challenge Cup of Asia Division I tournament which it went on to win.

== History ==
The Thailand men's national junior ice hockey team debuted at the 2019 IIHF U20 Challenge Cup of Asia Division I tournament in Kuala Lumpur, Malaysia. Their opening game of the tournament was against Mongolia which they won 14–1. Thailand went on to win their other two games against Indonesia and Kuwait, finishing first in the standings and winning the tournament. Their 25–0 win against Kuwait is currently their biggest win in international competition. Nathaphat Luckanatinakorn was named best forward after leading the scoring with 14 points and captain Phandaj Khuhakaew was named most valuable player of the tournament. Chayutapon Kulrat was named best defenceman and Chanokchon Limpinphet was selected as the best Thai player of the tournament.

== International competitions ==
- 2019 IIHF U20 Challenge Cup of Asia. Finish: 5th place (1st in Division I)
- 2022 IIHF U20 Asia and Oceania Championship. Finish: 1st place
- 2025 World Junior Championships — 41st overall (1st in Division III B)
- 2026 World Junior Championships — 39th overall (5th in Division IIIA)

== Players and personnel ==
=== Roster ===
During 2019 IIHF U20 Challenge Cup of Asia

#	Name	Pos	S/G	Age	Club
22	Purich Dhiranusornkit	D	R	22 February 2003	Canstars
6	Poon Harnchaipibulgul	D	L	20 April 2004	Canstars
4	Pann Hongswadhi	F	R	28 July 2002	Canstars
17	Phutthimet Ieosuwan	G	L	5 March 2004	Canstars
89	Chonlaphat Ingkharratphithakon	F	R	2 June 2003	Canstars
26	Krittapad Jaradwuttipreeda	F	L	25 February 2000	IHAT
75	Rachata Kajonsaksumet	D	L	29 September 1999	IHAT
97	Phandaj Khuhakaew (C)	F	L	27 April 1999	Canstars
56	Kanit Kitirienglap	D	R	27 March 2002	Canstars
36	Chayutapon Kulrat	D	L	22 August 2000	Canstars
42	Chanokchon Limpinphet (A)	F	R	26 March 1999	IHAT
72	Nathaphat Luckanatinakorn	F	R	14 October 2002	IHAT
19	Punn Phasukkijwatana	F	R	11 May 2003	Canstars
18	Nattasate Phatigulsate	F	R	26 March 2004	Canstars
96	Sittinon Promthong	F	R	29 October 2004	Canstars
14	Phanuruj Suwachirat	F	R	5 September 2001	IHAT
37	Karith Thaiyanont	D	L	9 October 2001	IHAT
35	Patchara Trirat	G	L	24 January 2002	IHAT
63	Araya Vatanapanyakul (A)	D	L	5 June 1999	Canstars
83	Vatcharin Wilailux	F	L	11 January 2000	IHAT

=== Team staff ===
During 2019 IIHF U20 Challenge Cup of Asia

- Head coach: Juhani Ijas
- Assistant coach: Ken Edvin Kindborn
- General manager: Pongsaya Hongswadhi
- Team leader: M. L. Krisada Kasemsunt
- Equipment manager: Sudjai Sornjai
- Team staff: Sakchai Chinanuvatana
