= Kuwait men's national junior ice hockey team =

- The emblem of Kuwait is used as the badge on the players jerseys.
- Association: Kuwait Ice Hockey Association
- Head coach: Kamil Vavra
- Captain: Ali Alsarraf
- Team colors
- IIHF code: KUW

First international
- Indonesia 10–3 Kuwait (Kuala Lumpur, Malaysia; 3 December 2018)

Biggest defeat
- Thailand 25–0 Kuwait (Kuala Lumpur, Malaysia; 6 December 2018)

IIHF U20 Challenge Cup of Asia Division I
- Appearances: 1 (first in 2019)
- Best result: 4th (2019)

International record (W–L–T)
- 0–3–0

The Kuwait men's national junior ice hockey team is the men's national under-20 ice hockey team of Kuwait. The team is controlled by the Kuwait Ice Hockey Association, a member of the International Ice Hockey Federation. The team made its international debut in December 2018 at the 2019 IIHF U20 Challenge Cup of Asia Division I tournament which it went on to finish fourth.

== History ==
The Kuwait men's national junior ice hockey team debuted at the 2019 IIHF U20 Challenge Cup of Asia Division I tournament in Kuala Lumpur, Malaysia. Their opening game of the tournament was against Indonesia which they lost 3–10. Kuwait went to lose their other two games against Mongolia and Thailand, finishing the tournament in fourth. Their 0–25 loss to Thailand is currently their biggest loss in international competition. Ahmad Alsaegh was named the best goaltender by the IIHF Directorate and selected as the best Kuwaiti player of the tournament.

== International competitions ==
- 2019 IIHF U20 Challenge Cup of Asia Division I. Finish: 4th

== Players and personnel ==
=== Roster ===
From the team's most recent tournament

#	Name	Pos	S/G	Age	Club
30	Saleh Abdallah	D	L	5 June 2001	Kuwait Stars
8	Mashari Alajmi	F	L	24 May 2000	Kuwait
6	Abdulrazaq Aldaei	D	R	11 September 2002	Kuwait Stars
26	Omar Alhoshan	G	L	7 October 2002	Kuwait Warriors
22	Hussain Ali	D	R	3 February 2003	Kuwait
2	Abdulaziz Alkhashan	F	R	2 November 2001	Kuwait Warriors
9	Abdulmuhsen Alkhashram	F	R	14 April 2003	Kuwait Warriors
21	Mosaed Alnajem	D	R	16 March 2003	Kuwait
29	Abdullah Alotaibi	F	L	13 September 2001	Kuwait
27	Bader Alqattan (A)	F	R	2 December 2001	Kuwait Falcons
28	Salem Alqattan (A)	F	R	5 November 2002	Kuwait Warriors
1	Ahmad Alsaegh	G	L	27 October 2000	Kuwait Stars
17	Ali Alsarraf (C)	F	L	20 October 2001	Kuwait Falcons
11	Abdullah Alshaddad	F	R	28 January 2003	Kuwait Falcons
24	Mohammad Alsuraya	F	R	10 May 2000	Kuwait
10	Aqeel Bosakhar	D	R	29 April 2001	Kuwait Falcons
5	khalaf Khalaf	D	L	24 January 2001	Kuwait Warriors
20	Moaaz Khalifuoh	D	R	12 October 2002	Kuwait

=== Team staff ===
From the team's most recent tournament

- Head coach: Kamil Vavra
- General manager: Ahmad Alajmi
- General manager: Ahmad Alomran
- Team leader: Ghunaim Alazmi
- Equipment manager: Ramadan Abdelmeguid
- Team staff: Ali Albehairi
