= Paolo Maccagnan =

Italian choir conductor

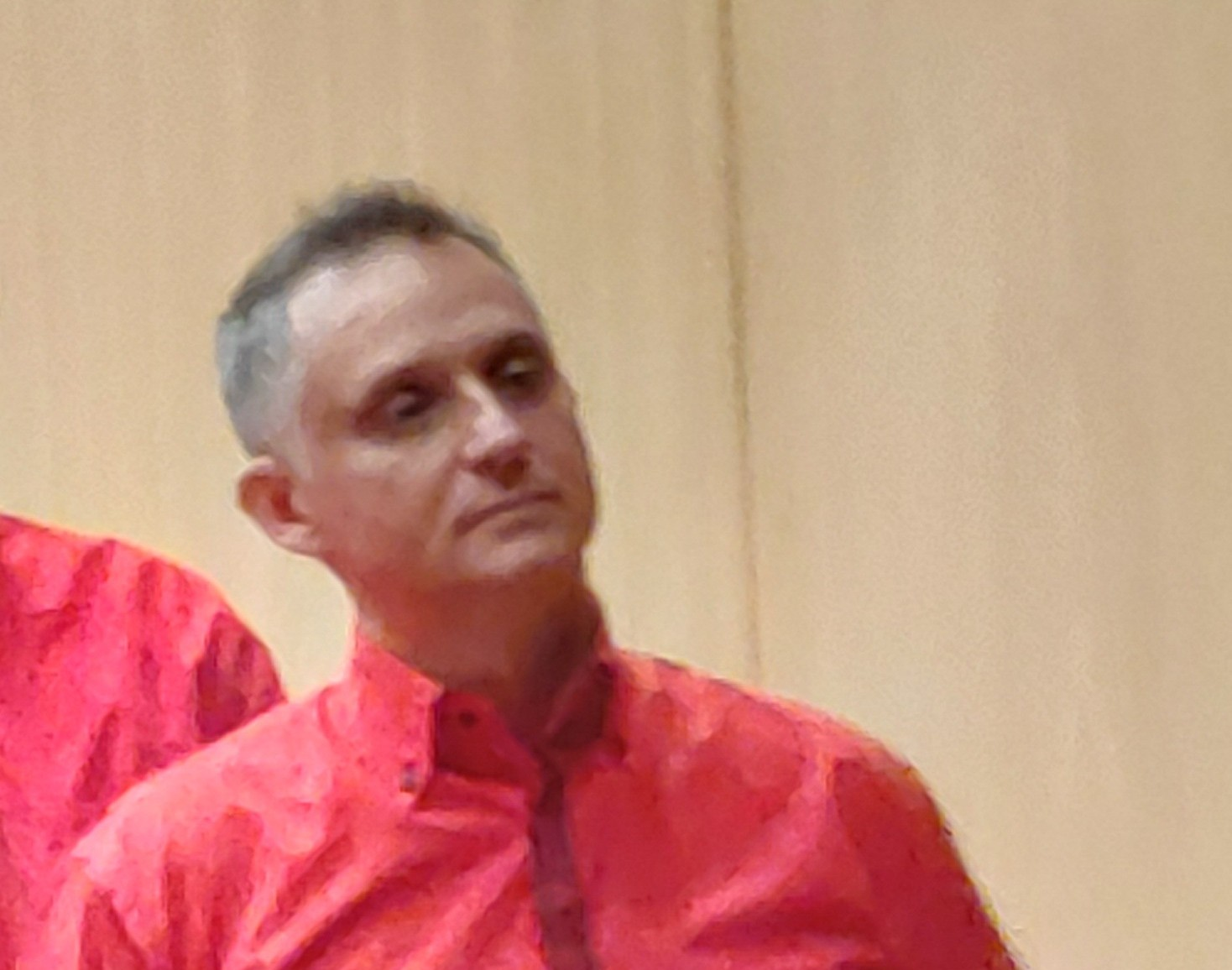
Paolo Maccagnan

Paolo Maccagnan (Bolzano, June 19, 1968) is an Italian choral conductor.

Son of the choir conductor Sergio Maccagnan, he studied as pianist at conservatory of music of Bolzano and Riva del Garda.

In 1998 he began conducting a first youth choir linked to the Coro Monti Pallidi, which was conducted by his father: the Piccolo Coro Monti Pallidi, which lasted three years.

In 2005 he then took over from his father in the direction of the Coro Monti Pallidi.

Under his guide the choir, together with Rudy Giovannini and Belsy, won the Grand Prix der Volksmusik 2006.

In addition to the Coro Monti Pallidi, Maccagnan also conducts the female choir Coro Artemisia, born in 2015, and the mixed voices choir Schola Cantorum, born in 1981, disbanded in 2005 and re-established in 2017; Maccagnan also performs on the piano with the youth choir of the Coro Monti Pallidi, the Piccole Voci del Coro Monti Pallidi, directed by his sister Lorenza Maccagnan.
