= 2019 IIHF U20 Challenge Cup of Asia Division I =

Tournament details
- Host country: Malaysia
- City: Kuala Lumpur
- Venue(s): 1 (in 1 host city)
- Dates: 3–6 December 2018
- Teams: 4

Final positions
- Champions: Thailand (1st title)
- Runner-up: Mongolia
- Third place: Indonesia

Tournament statistics
- Games played: 6
- Goals scored: 83 (13.83 per game)
- Attendance: 1,035 (173 per game)
- Scoring leader(s): (Thailand) Nathaphat Luckanatinakorn (14 points)

Awards
- MVP: (Thailand) Phandaj Khuhakaew

The 2019 IIHF U20 Challenge Cup of Asia Division I was an international men's under-20 ice hockey tournament run by the International Ice Hockey Federation (IIHF). The tournament took place between 3 December and 6 December 2018 in Kuala Lumpur, Malaysia and was the first edition held under the IIHF Challenge Cup of Asia series of tournaments. The tournament made up the second level of competition sitting below the 2019 IIHF U20 Challenge Cup of Asia. Thailand won the tournament after finishing first in the standings. Mongolia finished in second place and Indonesia finished third.

== Overview ==
The 2019 IIHF U20 Challenge Cup of Asia Division I began on 3 December 2018 in Kuala Lumpur, Malaysia with games played at the Malaysia National Ice Skating Stadium (MyNISS). The under-20 teams of Indonesia, Kuwait, Mongolia and Thailand made their debut international appearances at the tournament. The tournament ran alongside the 2019 IIHF U20 Challenge Cup of Asia competition with all games being held in Kuala Lumpur.

The tournament consisted of a single round-robin with each team competing in three games. Thailand won the tournament after winning all three of their games to finish at the top of the standings. Mongolia finished second after losing only to Thailand and Indonesia finished in third. Nathaphat Luckanatinakorn of Thailand led the tournament in scoring with 14 points and was named best forward by the IIHF Directorate. Thailand's Phandaj Khuhakaew and Chayutapon Kulrat were named most valuable player and top defenceman respectively and Ahmad Alsaegh of Kuwait was named best goaltender. Thailand's Patchara Trirat finished as the tournaments leading goaltender with a save percentage of 100.00.

== Standings ==
The final standings of the tournament.

Team	Pld	W	OTW	OTL	L	GF	GA	GD	Pts
Thailand	3	3	0	0	0	54	1	+53	9
Mongolia	3	2	0	0	1	13	17	−4	6
Indonesia	3	1	0	0	2	11	21	−10	3
Kuwait	3	0	0	0	3	5	44	−39	0

Source: IIHF

== Fixtures ==
All times are local. (MST – UTC+8)

3 December 2018; 14:00	Kuwait	3–10 (0–4, 0–2, 3–4)	Indonesia	MyNISS; Attendance: 130

Game reference
35 min	Penalties	18 min
8	Shots	61

3 December 2018; 17:30	Mongolia	1–14 (1–2, 0–5, 0–7)	Thailand	MyNISS; Attendance: 142

Game reference
10 min	Penalties	26 min
14	Shots	63

4 December 2018; 18:00	Thailand	15–0 (5–0, 6–0, 4–0)	Indonesia	MyNISS; Attendance: 182

Game reference
4 min	Penalties	6 min
67	Shots	10

4 December 2018; 21:00	Kuwait	2–9 (0–2, 1–3, 1–4)	Mongolia	MyNISS; Attendance: 260

Game reference
10 min	Penalties	10 min
15	Shots	57

6 December 2018; 17:00	Indonesia	1–3 (0–3, 1–0, 0–0)	Mongolia	MyNISS; Attendance: 133

Game reference
8 min	Penalties	6 min
16	Shots	39

6 December 2018; 20:30	Thailand	25–0 (6–0, 9–0, 10–0)	Kuwait	MyNISS; Attendance: 188

Game reference
4 min	Penalties	4 min
96	Shots	4

== Scoring leaders ==
List shows the top ten skaters sorted by points, then goals, assists.

Player (Team)	GP	G	A	Pts	+/–	PIM	POS
(Thailand) Nathaphat Luckanatinakorn (THA)	3	9	5	14	+18	0	F
(Thailand) Phandaj Khuhakaew (THA)	3	6	7	13	+22	2	F
(Thailand) Chanokchon Limpinphet (THA)	3	3	9	12	+14	0	F
(Thailand) Purich Dhiranusornkit (THA)	3	2	7	9	+17	2	D
(Thailand) Phanuruj Suwachirat (THA)	3	3	4	7	+15	2	F
(Thailand) Karith Thaiyanont (THA)	3	1	6	7	+11	0	D
(Thailand) Krittapad Jaradwuttipreeda (THA)	3	6	0	6	+10	4	F
(Thailand) Poon Harnchaipibulgul (THA)	3	2	4	6	+15	2	D
(Thailand) Chayutapon Kulrat (THA)	3	2	4	6	+18	0	D
(Thailand) Nattasate Phatigulsate (THA)	3	1	5	6	+12	0	F
(Thailand) Araya Vatanapanyakul (THA)	3	1	5	6	+15	14	D

== Leading goaltenders ==
Only the top goaltenders, based on save percentage, who have played at least 40% of their team's minutes are included in this list.

Player (Team)	MIP	SOG	GA	GAA	SVS%	SO
(Thailand) Patchara Trirat (THA)	89:45	14	0	0.00	100.00	1
(Thailand) Phutthimet Ieosuwan (THA)	90:15	14	1	0.66	92.86	0
(Mongolia) Batbayajikh Bolormaa (MGL)	129:15	49	6	2.79	87.76	0
(Indonesia) Sangga Putra (INA)	150:50	109	18	7.16	83.49	0
(Kuwait) Ahmad Alsaegh (KUW)	157:47	182	34	12.93	81.32	0
