= Indonesia men's national junior ice hockey team =

- Garuda Pancasila is the badge used on the players jerseys.
- Association: Indonesia Ice Hockey Federation
- Head coach: Ronald Wijaya
- Captain: Muchammad Alqaeda
- Team colors
- IIHF code: INA

First international
- Kuwait 3–10 Indonesia (Kuala Lumpur, Malaysia; 3 December 2018)

Biggest win
- Kuwait 3–10 Indonesia (Kuala Lumpur, Malaysia; 3 December 2018)

IIHF U20 Challenge Cup of Asia Division I
- Appearances: 1 (first in 2019)
- Best result: 3rd (2019)

International record (W–L–T)
- 1–2–0

Medal record

U20 Asia and Oceania Championship
Bronze medal – third place	2019 Kuala Lumpur	Division I

The Indonesia men's national junior ice hockey team is the men's national under-20 ice hockey team of Indonesia. The team is controlled by the Indonesia Ice Hockey Federation, a member of the International Ice Hockey Federation. The team made its international debut in December 2018 at the 2019 IIHF U20 Challenge Cup of Asia Division I tournament which it went on to finish third.

== History ==
The Indonesia men's national junior ice hockey team debuted at the 2019 IIHF U20 Challenge Cup of Asia Division I tournament in Kuala Lumpur, Malaysia. Their opening game of the tournament was against Kuwait which they won 10–3, and is also currently their largest and only win in international competition. Indonesia went on to lose their other two games against Mongolia and Thailand, finishing the tournament in third. Their 0–15 loss to Thailand is currently their biggest loss in international competition. Goaltender Sangga Putra was selected as the best Indonesian player of the tournament.

== International competitions ==
=== Challenge Cup of Asia ===
Year	Host	Result	Pld	W	OTW	OTL	L
2019	(Malaysia) Kuala Lumpur	7th place (3rd in Division I)	3	1	0	0	2
2020	(Thailand) Bangkok	Tournament cancelled due to the COVID-19 pandemic					
Total		1/1	3	1	0	0	2

=== Asia and Oceania Championships ===
Year	Host	Result	Pld	W	OTW	OTL	L
2010 – 2020		Not participated					
2022	(Thailand) Bangkok	7th place (3rd in Division I)	4	2	0	0	2
Total		1/9	3	1	0	0	2

== Players and personnel ==
=== Roster ===
From the team's most recent tournament

#	Name	Pos	S/G	Age	Club
26	Khalil Alliga	F	R	26 December 2002	BadaX Indonesia
69	Muchammad Alqaeda (C)	D	R	28 December 2001	BadaX Indonesia
45	Rafael Edbert Axille	F	L	3 October 2004	BadaX Indonesia
88	Kevin Harisputra	F	R	24 November 2004	BadaX Indonesia
64	Ignatius Revel Iswadi	F	R	6 April 2002	BadaX Indonesia
9	Arthur Jordan (A)	D	R	30 December 2002	BadaX Indonesia
89	Diyas Mahdi	G	R	5 April 2002	Salamander
18	Abraham Novendra	F	R	18 November 1999	BadaX Indonesia
63	Jonathan Ryan Nugraha (A)	F	R	6 March 2002	BadaX Indonesia
72	Joseph Pramuka	D	R	11 July 2003	BadaX Indonesia
97	Jeremiah Praptasuganda	F	R	23 October 2003	BadaX Indonesia
27	Rizqi Akira Prijanto	D	R	27 August 2002	BadaX Indonesia
19	Sangga Putra	G	L	9 November 2000	BadaX Indonesia
7	Farrell Synarso	F	R	26 February 2003	BadaX Indonesia

=== Team staff ===
From the team's most recent tournament

- Head coach: Ronald Wijaya
- Assistant coach: Andianto Hie
- General manager: Simon Hartanto
- Team leader: Raymond Synarso
- Equipment manager: Felix Yussanto
- Team staff: Mozes Iwan Mulyawan
