= Deutschnofen =

- Comune
- Gemeinde Deutschnofen; Comune di Nova Ponente
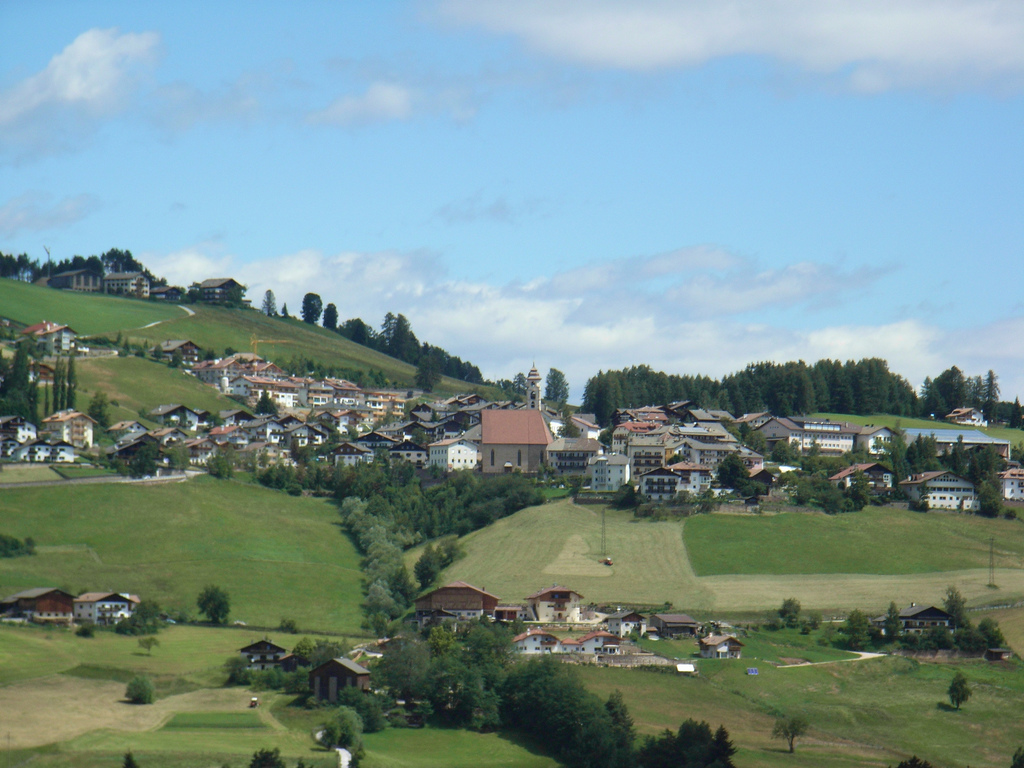
- View of Deutschnofen

- Location within Italy Location within Trentino-Alto Adige/Südtirol
- Coordinates: 46°25′N 11°26′E
- Country: Italy
- Region: Trentino-Alto Adige/Südtirol
- Province: South Tyrol (BZ)
- Frazioni: Petersberg (Monte San Pietro), Sankt Nikolaus/Eggen (San Nicolò d'Ega)

Government
  - Mayor: Bernhard Daum

Area
  - Total: 112.49 km^{2} (43.43 sq mi)
- Elevation: 1,357 m (4,452 ft)

Population (31 August 2020)
  - Total: 4,011
  - Density: 35.66/km^{2} (92.35/sq mi)
- Demonyms: German: Deutschnofner; Italian: di Nova Ponente
- Time zone: UTC+1 (CET)
  - Summer (DST): UTC+2 (CEST)
- Postal code: 39050
- Dialing code: 0471
- Website: Official website

Deutschnofen (German pronunciation: [ˌdɔʏtʃn̩ˈoːfn̩]; Italian: Nova Ponente [ˈnɔːva poˈnɛnte]) is a comune (municipality) in the province of South Tyrol in northern Italy, located about 30 kilometres (19 mi) southeast of the city of Bolzano.

Deutschnofen borders the following municipalities: Aldein, Bolzano, Bronzolo, Karneid, Laives, Welschnofen, and municipalities of Predazzo, Tesero and Varena in Trentino.

The municipality of Deutschnofen contains the frazioni (subdivisions, mainly villages and hamlets) Petersberg (Italian: Monte San Pietro), Eggen (Italian: San Nicolò d'Ega), Rauth (Novale) and Obereggen, a small tourist village located on the foot of the Latemar, with some 900 inhabitants.

The A22 motorway is located 15 kilometres (9 mi) from the village. Deutschnofen shares 7 km of the frontier with Trentino. The Brantental valley connects it with Laives.

== Coat-of-arms ==
The coat of arms is party per fess of argent and gules crossed, from edge to edge, from a knotty sable branch. The color argent symbolizes the deposits of dolomite and the gules ones those of porphyry; the branch represents the woodiness of the municipality. The emblem was adopted in 1969.

== Linguistic distribution ==
According to the 2024 census, 95.42% of the population speak German, 4.33% Italian and 0.25% Ladin as first language.

Language	2001	2011	2024
German	97.10%	97.42%	95.42%
Italian	2.51%	2.33%	4.33%
Ladin	0.39%	0.25%	0.25%

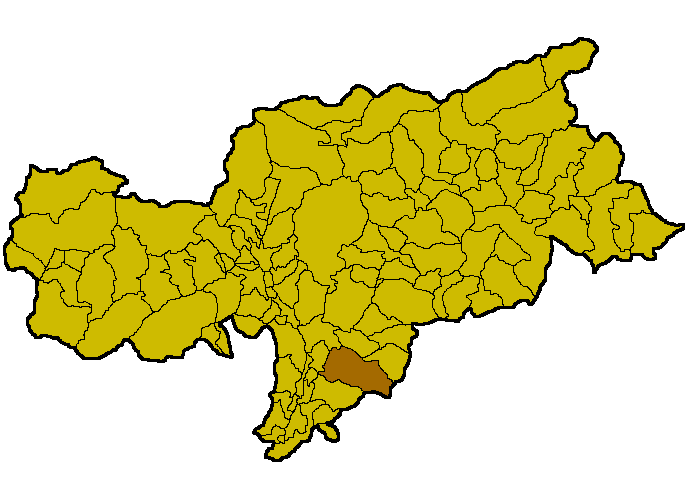
Location of Deutschnofen within the Province of Bolzano-Bozen
