= 2018 in ice sports =

== Bandy ==
- January 9 – 13: 2018 Women's Bandy World Championship in (China) Chengde
  - Sweden defeated Russia, 1–0, to win their second consecutive and eighth overall Women's Bandy World Championship title.
  - Norway took third place.
- January 26 – 28: 2018 Bandy World Championship Y-19 in Drammen
  - Russia defeated Sweden, 6–3, to win their 8th Bandy World Championship Y-19 title.
  - Norway took third place.
- January 26 – 28: 2018 Youth Bandy World Championship (Y15 category) in (United States) Minneapolis
- January 28 – February 4: 2018 Bandy World Championship Division B in (China) Harbin
  - The Netherlands defeated Japan, 3–2, in the final.
  - Estonia took third place.
- January 29 – February 4: 2018 Bandy World Championship Division A in Khabarovsk
  - Russia defeated Sweden, 5–4, to win their 11th Bandy World Championship title.
  - Finland took third place.
- February 9 – 11: 2018 Youth Bandy World Championship (Y17 category) in (Russia) Ulyanovsk
- March 22 – 24: 2018 Bandy World Championship Y-15 in Sweden
- March 22 – 24: 2018 Bandy World Championship Y-17 in (Russia) Ulyanovsk

== Bobsleigh & skeleton ==
=== 2018 Winter Olympics (Bobsleigh & skeleton) ===
- February 15 – 17: Skeleton at the 2018 Winter Olympics in (South Korea) Pyeongchang
  - Men's winners: (gold) (South Korea) Yun Sung-bin; (silver) (International Olympic Committee) Nikita Tregubov; (bronze) (United Kingdom) Dominic Parsons
  - Women's winners: (gold) (United Kingdom) Lizzy Yarnold; (silver) (Germany) Jacqueline Lölling; (bronze) (United Kingdom) Laura Deas
- February 18 – 25: Bobsleigh at the 2018 Winter Olympics in Pyeongchang
  - Two-man bobsleigh winners: (gold) Canada (Justin Kripps & Alexander Kopacz); (gold) Germany (Francesco Friedrich & Thorsten Margis); (bronze) Latvia (Oskars Melbārdis & Jānis Strenga)
    - Note: No silver medal was awarded here, due to a tie for first place, after all bobsleigh runs were completed.
  - Four-man bobsleigh winners: (gold) Germany; (silver) Germany; (silver) South Korea
    - Note: No bronze medal was awarded here, due to a tie for second place, after all bobsleigh runs were completed.
  - Women's bobsleigh winners: (gold) Germany (Mariama Jamanka & Lisa Buckwitz); (silver) United States (Elana Meyers & Lauren Gibbs); (bronze) Canada (Kaillie Humphries & Phylicia George)

=== International bobsleigh & skeleton events ===
- December 15 – 17, 2017: 2018 IBSF European Championships in (Austria) Innsbruck
  - Two-man bobsleigh winners: Germany (Francesco Friedrich & Thorsten Margis)
  - Four-man bobsleigh winners: Germany (Johannes Lochner, Marc Rademacher, Joshua Bluhm, & Christian Rasp)
  - Women's bobsleigh winners: Germany (Stephanie Schneider & Annika Drazek)
  - Skeleton winners: (Latvia) Martins Dukurs (m) / (Russia) Elena Nikitina (f)
- January 19: 2018 IBSF Para European Championships in (Austria) Innsbruck
  - Para-bobsleigh winner: (Latvia) Alvils Brants
- January 25 – 28: 2018 IBSF Junior & U23 World Championships in (Switzerland) St. Moritz
  - Junior two-man bobsleigh winners: Germany (Richard Oelsner & Alexander Schueller)
  - Junior four-man bobsleigh winners: Germany (Pablo Nolte, Alexander Mair, Matthias Sommer, & Florian Bauer)
  - Junior women's bobsleigh winners: Romania (Andreea Grecu & Costina Iusco Florentina)
  - Junior Skeleton winners: (Russia) Nikita Tregubov (m) / (Germany) Anna Fernstaedt (f)
  - Two-man U23 bobsleigh winners: Germany (Richard Oelsner & Alexander Schueller)
  - Four-man U23 bobsleigh winners: Germany (Richard Oelsner, Benedikt Hertel, Alexander Schueller, & Paul Straub)
  - Women's U23 bobsleigh winners: Germany (Laura Nolte & Lavinia Pittschaft)
- March 10 & 11: 2018 IBSF Para World Championships in (Norway) Lillehammer
  - Para-bobsleigh winner: (Latvia) Arturs Klots

=== 2017–18 Bobsleigh World Cup & 2017–18 Skeleton World Cup ===
- November 5 – 10, 2017: B&SWC #1 in Lake Placid, New York
  - Two-man bobsleigh winners: Germany (Nico Walther & Christian Poser) (#1) / United States (Codie Bascue & Samuel McGuffie) (#2)
  - Women's bobsleigh winners: Canada (Kaillie Humphries & Melissa Lotholz)
  - Skeleton winners: (Latvia) Martins Dukurs (m) / (Austria) Janine Flock (f)
- November 13 – 18, 2017: B&SWC #2 in Park City
  - Four-man bobsleigh #1 winners: Germany (Nico Walther, Kevin Kuske, Christian Poser, & Eric Franke)
  - Four-man bobsleigh #2 winners: Germany (Johannes Lochner, Marc Rademacher, Christopher Weber, & Christian Rasp)
  - Women's bobsleigh winners: United States (Jamie Greubel & Lauren Gibbs)
  - Skeleton winners: (South Korea) Yun Sung-bin (m) / (Russia) Elena Nikitina (f)
- November 20 – 25, 2017: B&SWC #3 in Whistler, British Columbia
  - Two-man bobsleigh winners: Canada (Christopher Spring & Neville Wright)
  - Four-man bobsleigh winners: Russia (Alexander Kasjanov, Ilvir Huzin, Vasiliy Kondratenko, & Aleksei Pushkarev)
  - Women's bobsleigh winners: Canada (Kaillie Humphries & Melissa Lotholz)
  - Skeleton winners: (South Korea) Yun Sung-bin (m) / (Germany) Jacqueline Lölling (f)
- December 4 – 10, 2017: B&SWC #4 in Winterberg
  - Two-man bobsleigh winners: Switzerland (Clemens Bracher & Michael Kuonen)
  - Four-man bobsleigh winners: Germany (Johannes Lochner, Joshua Bluhm, Christopher Weber, & Christian Rasp)
  - Women's bobsleigh winners: Germany (Stephanie Schneider & Lisa Buckwitz)
  - Skeleton winners: (South Korea) Yun Sung-bin (m) / (Germany) Jacqueline Lölling (f)
- December 11 – 17, 2017: B&SWC #5 in (Austria) Innsbruck
  - Two-man bobsleigh winners: Germany (Francesco Friedrich & Thorsten Margis)
  - Four-man bobsleigh winners: Germany (Johannes Lochner, Marc Rademacher, Joshua Bluhm, & Christian Rasp)
  - Women's bobsleigh winners: Germany (Stephanie Schneider & Annika Drazek)
  - Skeleton winners: (Latvia) Martins Dukurs (m) / (Russia) Elena Nikitina (f)
- January 1 – 7: B&SWC #6 in Altenberg, Saxony
  - Two-man bobsleigh winners: Canada (Justin Kripps & Alexander Kopacz)
  - Four-man bobsleigh winners: Germany (Nico Walther, Kevin Kuske, Christian Poser, & Eric Franke)
  - Women's bobsleigh winners: Canada (Kaillie Humphries & Phylicia George)
  - Skeleton winners: (South Korea) Yun Sung-bin (m) / (Germany) Jacqueline Lölling (f)
- January 8 – 14: B&SWC #7 in (Switzerland) St. Moritz
  - Two-man bobsleigh winners: Germany (Nico Walther & Christian Poser)
  - Four-man bobsleigh winners: Germany (Johannes Lochner, Sebastian Mrowka, Joshua Bluhm, & Christian Rasp)
  - Women's bobsleigh winners: United States (Elana Meyers & Lolo Jones)
  - Skeleton winners: (South Korea) Yun Sung-bin (m) / (Austria) Janine Flock (f)
- January 15 – 21: B&SWC #8 (final) in Schönau am Königsee
  - Two-man bobsleigh winners: Germany (Francesco Friedrich & Thorsten Margis)
  - Four-man bobsleigh winners: Germany (Nico Walther, Kevin Kuske, Alexander Rödiger, & Eric Franke)
  - Women's bobsleigh winners: Germany (Stephanie Schneider & Annika Drazek)
  - Skeleton winners: (Germany) Axel Jungk (m) / (Germany) Jacqueline Lölling (f)

=== 2017–18 IBSF Intercontinental Cup ===
- November 4 & 5, 2017: SIC #1 in (Canada) Whistler
  - Men's Skeleton winner: (Germany) Kilian von Schleinitz (2 times)
  - Women's Skeleton winners: (Germany) Anna Fernstädt (#1) / (Canada) Lanette Prediger (#2)
- November 12 & 13, 2017: SIC #2 in (Canada) Calgary
  - Men's Skeleton winner: (Germany) Felix Keisinger (2 times)
  - Women's Skeleton winner (Germany) Anna Fernstädt (2 times)
- January 4 & 5: SIC #3 in (Switzerland) St. Moritz
  - Men's Skeleton winner: (Germany) Felix Keisinger (2 times)
  - Women's Skeleton winners: (Germany) Janine Becker (#1) / (United States) Katie Uhlaender (#2)
- January 12 & 13: SIC #4 (final) in (Germany) Altenberg
  - Men's Skeleton winners: (Germany) Felix Keisinger (#1) / (Germany) Kilian Freiherr von Schleinitz (#2)
  - Women's Skeleton winner: (Germany) Sophia Griebel (2 times)

=== 2017–18 IBSF North American Cup ===
- November 4 – 7, 2017: B&SNAC #1 in Whistler
  - Two-man bobsleigh winners: South Korea (Suk Young-jin & JI Hoon) (#1) / Canada (Taylor Austin & Ryan Sommer) (#2)
  - Four-man bobsleigh winners: Brazil (Edson Bindilatti, Odirlei Pessoni, Edson Martins & Rafael Souza da Silva)
  - Women's bobsleigh winners: South Korea (KIM Yoo-ran & KIM Min-seong) (#1) / Canada (Julie Johnson & Alecia Beckford-Stewart) (#2)
  - Skeleton #1 winners: (Italy) Joseph Luke Cecchini (m) / (United States) Kelly Curtis (f)
  - Skeleton #2 winners: (Japan) Katsuyuki Miyajima (m) / (Canada) Grace Dafoe (f)
- November 12 – 17, 2017: B&SNAC #2 in (Canada) Calgary
  - Two-man bobsleigh winners: United States (Geoffrey Gadbois & Nicholas Taylor) (#1) / United States (Geoffrey Gadbois & Brent Fogt) (#2)
  - Four-man bobsleigh winners: United States (Geoffrey Gadbois, Nicholas Taylor, Brent Fogt, & Frank Delduca)
  - Women's bobsleigh winners: China (YING Qing & HE Xinyi) (#1) / United States (Kristi Koplin & Nicole Brundgardt) (#2)
  - Men's skeleton winner: (South Korea) JUNG Seung-gi (2 times)
  - Women's skeleton winner: (United States) Veronica Day (2 times)
- November 28 – December 1, 2017: B&SNAC #3 in Park City
  - Two-man bobsleigh winners: United States (Nick Cunningham & Christopher Kinney) (#1) / United States (Justin Olsen & Steven Langton) (#2)
  - Four-man bobsleigh #1 winners: United States (Justin Olsen, Evan Weinstock, Steven Langton, & Christopher Fogt)
  - Four-man bobsleigh #2 winners: United States (Nick Cunningham, Samuel Michener, Christopher Kinney, & Hakeem Abdul-Saboor)
  - Women's bobsleigh winners: United States (Elana Meyers & Briauna Jones) (#1) / United States (Nicole Vogt & Maureen Ajoku) (#2)
  - Men's Skeleton winner: (Australia) John Farrow (2 times)
  - Women's Skeleton winners: (Canada) Lanette Prediger (#1) / (South Korea) Sophia Jeong (#2)
- January 11 – 14: B&SNAC #4 (final) in Lake Placid
  - Two-man bobsleigh #1 winners: United States (Geoffrey Gadbois & Brent Fogt)
  - Two-man bobsleigh #2 winners: United States (Geoffrey Gadbois & Frank Delduca)
  - Four-man bobsleigh #1 winners: United States (Nick Cunningham, Hakeem Abdul-Saboor, Christopher Kinney, & Samuel Michener)
  - Four-man bobsleigh #2 winners: United States (Hunter Church, Brent Fogt, Lou Moreira, & Samuel Michener)
  - Women's bobsleigh #1 winners: United States (Nicole Vogt & Nicole Brundgardt)
  - Women's bobsleigh #2 winners: United States (Kristi Koplin & Nicole Brundgardt)
  - Skeleton #1 winners: (United States) Austin Florian (m) / (United States) Kelly Curtis (f)
  - Skeleton #2 winners: (Italy) Joseph Luke Cecchini / (United States) Kristen Hurley (f)

=== 2017–18 IBSF Europe Cup ===
- November 11 & 12, 2017: B&SEC #1 in (Norway) Lillehammer
  - Two-man bobsleigh winners: Switzerland (Clemens Bracher & Michael Kuonen) (2 times)
  - Women's bobsleigh winners: Austria (Katrin Beierl & Jennifer Jantina Oluumi Desire Onasanya) (2 times)
  - Men's Skeleton winners: (United Kingdom) Craig Thompson (#1) / (Latvia) Krists Netlaus (#2)
  - Women's Skeleton winner: (United Kingdom) Eleanor Furneaux (2 times)
- November 17 & 18, 2017: B&SEC #2 in (Germany) Winterberg #1
  - Skeleton #1 winners: (Germany) Martin Rosenberger (m) / (United Kingdom) Brogan Crowley (f)
  - Skeleton #2 winners: (Germany) Fabian Küchler (m) / (Germany) Corinna Leipold (f)
- November 23 – 25, 2017: B&SEC #3 in Altenberg #1
  - Two-man bobsleigh winners: Germany (Christoph Hafer & Tobias Schneider) (#1) / Poland (Mateusz Luty & Krzysztof Tylkowski) (#2)
  - Four-man bobsleigh winners: Austria (Markus Treichl, Markus Glueck, Angel Somov, & Ekemini Bassey)
  - Women's bobsleigh winners: Germany (Christin Senkel & Franziska Bertels)
- December 1 – 3, 2017: B&SEC #4 in Schönau am Königssee
  - Two-man bobsleigh winners: Germany (Johannes Lochner & Joshua Bluhm)
  - Four-man bobsleigh #1 winners: Germany (Pablo Nolte, Benedikt Hertel, Alexander Schueller, & Paul Straub)
  - Four-man bobsleigh #2 winners: Germany (Christoph Hafer, Michael Salzer, Korbinian Reichenberger, & Tobias Schneider)
  - Women's bobsleigh winners: Austria (Katrin Beierl & Jennifer Jantina Oluumi Desire Onasanya) (2 times)
- December 15 – 17, 2017: B&SEC #5 in (France) La Plagne
  - Two-man bobsleigh winners: Germany (Christoph Hafer & Tobias Schneider)
  - Four-man bobsleigh winners: Germany (Christoph Hafer, Michael Salzer, Korbinian Reichenberger, & Tobias Schneider) (2 times)
  - Women's bobsleigh winners: Germany (Christin Senkel & Leonie Fiebig)
  - Men's Skeleton winner: (Latvia) Krists Netlaus (2 times)
  - Women's Skeleton winners: (United Kingdom) Eleanor Furneaux (#1) / (Russia) Alina Tararychenkova (#2)
- January 5 & 6: B&SEC #6 in (Austria) Innsbruck #1
  - Two-man bobsleigh winners: Germany (Pablo Nolte & Florian Bauer)
  - Four-man bobsleigh winners: Switzerland (Clemens Bracher, Fabio Badraun, Martin Meier, & Michael Kuonen)
  - Women's bobsleigh winners: Germany (Christin Senkel & Lena Zelichowski)
- January 12: B&SEC #7 in (Germany) Altenberg #2
  - Skeleton winners: (Germany) Martin Rosenberger (m) / (Germany) Susanne Kreher (f)
- January 12 – 14: B&SEC #8 in Winterberg #2
  - Two-man bobsleigh winners: Germany (Richard Oelsner & Alexander Schueller)
  - Four-man bobsleigh winners: Germany (Richard Oelsner, Benedikt Hertel, Alexander Schueller, & Paul Straub) (2 times)
  - Women's bobsleigh winners: Germany (Christin Senkel & Lena Zelichowski)
- January 19: B&SEC #9 (final) in (Austria) Innsbruck #2
  - Skeleton winners: (Russia) Evgeniy Rukosuev (m) / (Russia) Alina Tararychenkova (f)

=== 2017–18 IBSF Para World Cup ===
- November 23 & 24, 2017: PWC #1 in (Canada) Calgary
  - Para bobsleigh winners: (United States) Jason Sturm (#1) / (Latvia) Annija Krumina (#2)
- December 1 & 2, 2017: PWC #2 in (United States) Lake Placid
  - Para bobsleigh winners: (Switzerland) Christopher Stewart (#1) / (United Kingdom) Corie Mapp (#2)
- January 18 & 19: PWC #3 in (Austria) Innsbruck
  - Para bobsleigh winners: (United Kingdom) Corie Mapp (#1) / (Latvia) Alvils Brants (#2)
- January 25 & 26: PWC #4 in (Germany) Oberhof
  - Para bobsleigh winner: (United Kingdom) Corie Mapp (2 times)
- February 1 & 2: PWC #5 (final) in (Switzerland) St. Moritz
  - Para bobsleigh winners: (Switzerland) Christopher Stewart (#1) / (Latvia) Arturs Klots (#2)

== Curling ==
=== 2018 Winter Olympics and Paralympics (Curling) ===
- December 5 – 10, 2017: 2017 Olympic Qualification Event in (Czech Republic) Plzeň
  - Men: Both Italy (Skip: Joël Retornaz) and Denmark (Skip: Rasmus Stjerne) have qualified to compete at the 2018 Winter Olympics.
  - Women: Both China (Skip: Wang Bingyu) and Denmark (Skip: Madeleine Dupont) have qualified to compete at the 2018 Winter Olympics.
- February 8 – 25: Curling at the 2018 Winter Olympics
  - Men's winners: (gold) United States (Skip: John Shuster); (silver) Sweden (Skip: Niklas Edin); (bronze) Switzerland (Skip: Peter de Cruz)
  - Women's winners: (gold) Sweden (Skip: Anna Hasselborg); (silver) South Korea (Skip: Kim Eun-jung); (bronze) Japan (Skip: Satsuki Fujisawa)
  - Mixed Doubles winners: (gold) Canada (Kaitlyn Lawes & John Morris); (silver) Switzerland (Jenny Perret & Martin Rios); (bronze) Norway (Kristin Skaslien & Magnus Nedregotten)
  - Note: Norway was given the bronze medal here, due to a doping offense by Alexander Krushelnitskiy. As the result, both Anastasia Bryzgalova and Krushelnitskiy has their medals taken away from them.
- March 10 – 17: Wheelchair curling at the 2018 Winter Paralympics
  - Winners: (gold) China (Skip: Wang Haitao); (silver) Norway (Skip: Rune Lorentsen); (bronze) Canada (Skip: Mark Ideson)

=== International curling championships ===
- October 6 – 14, 2017: 2017 World Mixed Curling Championship in (Switzerland) Champéry
  - Scotland (Skip: Grant Hardie) defeated Canada (Skip: Trevor Bonot), 8–5, to win Scotland's first World Mixed Curling Championship title.
  - The Czech Republic (Skip: Jaroslav Vedral) took third place.
- November 2 – 9, 2017: 2017 Pacific-Asia Curling Championships in (Australia) Erina, New South Wales
  - Men: South Korea (Skip: Kim Chang-min) defeated China (Skip: Zou Dejia), 9–8, to win South Korea's third Men's Pacific-Asia Curling Championships title.
    - Japan (Skip: Yusuke Morozumi) took third place.
  - Women: South Korea (Skip: Kim Eun-jung) defeated Japan (Skip: Satsuki Fujisawa), 11–6, to win South Korea's second consecutive and fifth overall Women's Pacific-Asia Curling Championships title.
    - China (Skip: Jiang Yilun) took third place.
- November 17 – 25, 2017: 2017 European Curling Championships in St. Gallen
  - Men: Sweden (Skip: Niklas Edin) defeated Scotland (Skip: Kyle Smith), 10–5, to win Sweden's fourth consecutive and 11th overall Men's European Curling Championships title.
    - Switzerland (Skip: Peter de Cruz) took third place.
  - Women: Scotland (Skip: Eve Muirhead) defeated Sweden (Skip: Anna Hasselborg), 6–3, to win Scotland's third Women's European Curling Championships title.
    - Italy (Skip: Diana Gaspari) took third place.
- March 3 – 10: 2018 World Junior Curling Championships in Aberdeen
  - Men: Canada (Skip: Tyler Tardi) defeated Scotland (Skip: Ross Whyte), 6–5, to win Canada's 19th Men's World Junior Curling Championships title.
    - Switzerland (Skip: Jan Hess) took third place.
  - Women: Canada (Skip: Kaitlyn Jones) defeated Sweden (Skip: Isabella Wranå), 7–4, to win Canada's 12th Women's World Junior Curling Championships title.
    - China (Skip: WANG Zixin) took third place.
- March 17 – 25: 2018 Ford World Women's Curling Championship in North Bay, Ontario
  - Canada (Skip: Jennifer Jones) defeated Sweden (Skip: Anna Hasselborg), 7–6, to win Canada's second consecutive and 17th overall World Women's Curling Championship title.
  - Russia (Skip: Victoria Moiseeva) took third place.
- March 31 – April 8: 2018 World Men's Curling Championship in (United States) Las Vegas
  - Sweden (Skip: Niklas Edin) defeated Canada (Skip: Brad Gushue), 7–3, to win Sweden's eighth World Men's Curling Championship title.
  - Scotland (Skip: Bruce Mouat) took third place.
- April 21 – 28: 2018 World Mixed Doubles and Senior Curling Championships in Östersund
  - Mixed Doubles: Switzerland (Sven Michel & Michèle Jäggi) defeated Russia (Daniil Goriachev & Maria Komarova), 9–6, to win Switzerland's second consecutive and seventh overall World Mixed Doubles Curling Championship title.
    - Canada (Kirk Muyres & Laura Crocker) took third place.
  - Senior Men: Canada (Skip: Wade White) defeated Sweden (Skip: Mats Wranå), 8–2, to win Canada's 10th Men's World Senior Curling Championships title.
    - United States (Skip: Jeff Wright) took third place.
  - Senior Women: Canada (Skip: Sherry Anderson) defeated United States (Skip: Margie Smith), 5–4, to win Canada's second consecutive and 12th overall Women's World Senior Curling Championships title.
    - Switzerland (Skip: Dagmar Frei) took third place.

=== 2017–18 Curling Canada season of champions ===
- November 6 – 12, 2017: 2017 Home Hardware Road to the Roar in (Prince Edward Island) Summerside
  - Men's "A" Side winner: British Columbia (Skip: John Morris)
  - Men's "B" Side winner: Alberta (Skip: Brendan Bottcher)
  - Women's "A" Side winner: Ontario (Skip: Krista McCarville)
  - Women's "B" Side winner: Ontario (Skip: Julie Tippin)
  - Note: All winners here have qualified to compete at the 2017 Roar of the Rings tournament.
- December 2 – 10, 2017: 2017 Tim Hortons Roar of the Rings in Ottawa
  - Men: Alberta (Skip: Kevin Koe) defeated Manitoba (Skip: Mike McEwen), 7–6.
  - Women: Ontario (Skip: Rachel Homan) defeated Alberta (Skip: Chelsea Carey), 6–5.
  - Note: Koe and Homan would represent Canada at the 2018 Winter Olympics in curling.
- January 2 – 7: 2018 Canad Inns Canadian Mixed Doubles Trials in (Manitoba) Portage la Prairie
  - (Manitoba) Kaitlyn Lawes and (Alberta) John Morris defeated both (Alberta) Valerie Sweeting and (Newfoundland and Labrador) Brad Gushue, 8–6.
  - Note: Both Lawes and Morris would represent Canada at the 2018 Winter Olympics in mixed doubles curling.
- January 11 – 14: 2018 Continental Cup of Curling in London, Ontario
  - Team North America defeated Team World, 30.5–30 points, to win their third consecutive and ninth overall Continental Cup of Curling title.
- January 13 – 21: 2018 Canadian Junior Curling Championships in Shawinigan
  - Men: British Columbia (Skip: Tyler Tardi) defeated Northern Ontario (Skip: Tanner Horgan), 8–4, to win British Columbia's second consecutive and sixth overall Men's Canadian Junior Curling Championships title.
  - Women: Nova Scotia (Skip: Kaitlyn Jones) defeated Quebec (Skip: Laurie St-Georges), 5–3, to win Nova Scotia's fifth Women's Canadian Junior Curling Championships title.
  - Note: Both Tardi and Jones would represent Canada at the 2018 World Junior Curling Championships.
- January 27 – February 4: 2018 Scotties Tournament of Hearts in (British Columbia) Penticton
  - Manitoba (Skip: Jennifer Jones) defeated Manitoba wildcard (Skip: Kerri Einarson), 8–6, to win Manitoba's ninth Scotties Tournament of Hearts title.
  - Note: Jennifer Jones would represent Canada at the 2018 Ford World Women's Curling Championship.
- March 3 – 11: 2018 Tim Hortons Brier in (Saskatchewan) Regina
  - Canada (Skip: Brad Gushue) defeated Alberta (Skip: Brendan Bottcher), 6–4, to win his second consecutive Tim Hortons Brier title. Also, Gushue defended his title as Team Canada, instead of representing Newfoundland and Labrador here.
  - Note: Brad Gushue would represent Canada at the 2018 World Men's Curling Championship.

=== 2017–18 World Curling Tour and Grand Slam of Curling ===
- August 3, 2017 – April 29, 2018: 2017–18 World Curling Tour and Grand Slam of Curling Seasons
  - September 5 – 10, 2017: 2017 GSOC Tour Challenge in (Saskatchewan) Regina
    - Men: (Newfoundland and Labrador) Brad Gushue (skip) defeated (Norway) Steffen Walstad (skip), 9–1, to win Newfoundland & Labrador's first Men's GSOC Tour Challenge title.
    - Women: Valerie Sweeting (skip) defeated (Sweden) Anna Hasselborg (skip), 6–5, to win Alberta's second consecutive Women's GSOC Tour Challenge title.
  - October 24 – 29, 2017: 2017 Masters of Curling in (Alberta) / (Saskatchewan) Lloydminster
    - Men: (Newfoundland and Labrador) Brad Gushue (skip) defeated (Sweden) Niklas Edin (skip), 8–4, to win his second Masters of Curling title.
    - Women: (Manitoba) Jennifer Jones (skip) defeated (Manitoba) Kerri Einarson (skip), 6–5, to win her first Masters of Curling title.
  - November 14 – 19, 2017: 2017 Boost National in Sault Ste. Marie, Ontario
    - Men: Bruce Mouat (skip) defeated (South Korea) Kim Chang-min (skip), 9–4, to win Scotland's first Men's Boost National title.
    - Women: Jennifer Jones (skip) defeated (Alberta) Casey Scheidegger (skip), 8–7, to win Manitoba's first Women's Boost National title.
  - January 16 – 21: 2018 Meridian Canadian Open in Camrose
    - Men: (Switzerland) Peter de Cruz (skip) defeated (Sweden) Niklas Edin (skip), 4–3, to win their first Men's Meridian Canadian Open title.
    - Note: This men's event was the first time that a non-Canadian team has won this title.
    - Women: Chelsea Carey (skip) defeated (Manitoba) Michelle Englot (skip), 10–5, to win Alberta's second consecutive Women's Meridian Canadian Open title.
  - March 16 – 19: 2018 Elite 10 (March) in (Nova Scotia) Port Hawkesbury
    - Mike McEwen (skip) defeated (Newfoundland and Labrador) Brad Gushue (skip), 4–1, to win Manitoba's second Elite 10 title.
  - April 10 – 15: 2018 Players' Championship in (Ontario) Toronto
    - Men: Kevin Koe (skip) defeated (Sweden) Niklas Edin (skip), 6–2, to win Alberta's 12th Men's Players' Championship title.
    - Women: Jamie Sinclair (skip) defeated (Manitoba) Jennifer Jones (skip), 7–2, to win United States' first Women's Players' Championship title.
  - April 24 – 29: 2018 Humpty's Champions Cup in (Alberta) Calgary
    - Men: (Newfoundland and Labrador) Brad Gushue (skip) defeated (Ontario) Glenn Howard (skip), 8–2, to win Newfoundland & Labrador's first Men's Humpty's Champions Cup title.
    - Women: Rachel Homan (skip) defeated (Manitoba) Kerri Einarson (skip), 7–6, to win Ontario's second consecutive Women's Humpty's Champions Cup title.

== Figure skating ==
=== 2018 Winter Olympics (Figure skating) ===
- February 9 – 23: Figure skating at the 2018 Winter Olympics in (South Korea) Pyeongchang
  - Men's winners: (gold) (Japan) Yuzuru Hanyu; (silver) (Japan) Shoma Uno; (bronze) (Spain) Javier Fernández
  - Ladies' winners: (gold) (International Olympic Committee) Alina Zagitova; (silver) (International Olympic Committee) Evgenia Medvedeva; (bronze) (Canada) Kaetlyn Osmond
  - Pairs winners: (gold) Germany (Aliona Savchenko & Bruno Massot); (silver) China (Sui Wenjing & Han Cong); (bronze) Canada (Meagan Duhamel & Eric Radford)
  - Ice dance winners: (gold) Canada (Tessa Virtue & Scott Moir) (World Record); (silver) France (Gabriella Papadakis & Guillaume Cizeron); (bronze) United States (Maia Shibutani & Alex Shibutani)
  - Team winners: (gold) Canada; (silver) Olympic Athletes from Russia; (bronze) United States

=== International figure skating events ===
- January 15 – 21: 2018 European Figure Skating Championships in Moscow
  - Men's winner: (Spain) Javier Fernández
  - Ladies' winner: (Russia) Alina Zagitova
  - Pairs winners: Russia (Evgenia Tarasova & Vladimir Morozov)
  - Ice dance winners: France (Gabriella Papadakis & Guillaume Cizeron)
- January 22 – 27: 2018 Four Continents Figure Skating Championships in (Chinese Taipei) Taipei
  - Men's winner: (China) Jin Boyang
  - Ladies' winner: (Japan) Kaori Sakamoto
  - Pairs winners: United States (Tarah Kayne & Daniel O'Shea)
  - Ice dance winners: United States (Kaitlin Hawayek & Jean-Luc Baker)
- March 5 – 11: 2018 World Junior Figure Skating Championships in (Bulgaria) Sofia
  - Junior Men's winner: (Russia) Alexey Erokhov
  - Junior Ladies' winner: (Russia) Alexandra Trusova
  - Junior Pairs winners: Russia (Daria Pavliuchenko & Denis Khodykin)
  - Junior Ice dance winners: Russia (Anastasia Skoptsova & Kirill Aleshin)
- March 19 – 25: 2018 World Figure Skating Championships in (Italy) Milan
  - Men's winner: (United States) Nathan Chen
  - Ladies' winner: (Canada) Kaetlyn Osmond
  - Pairs winners: Germany (Aliona Savchenko & Bruno Massot)
  - Ice dance winners: France (Gabriella Papadakis & Guillaume Cizeron)

=== 2017–18 ISU Grand Prix of Figure Skating ===
- October 20 – 22: 2017 Rostelecom Cup in Moscow
  - Men's winner: (United States) Nathan Chen
  - Ladies' winner: (Russia) Evgenia Medvedeva
  - Pairs winners: Russia (Evgenia Tarasova & Vladimir Morozov)
  - Ice dance winners: United States (Maia Shibutani & Alex Shibutani)
- October 27 – 29: 2017 Skate Canada International in Regina, Saskatchewan
  - Men's winner: (Japan) Shoma Uno
  - Ladies' winner: (Canada) Kaetlyn Osmond
  - Pairs winners: Canada (Meagan Duhamel & Eric Radford)
  - Ice dance winners: Canada (Tessa Virtue & Scott Moir)
- November 3 – 5: 2017 Cup of China in Beijing
  - Men's winner: (Russia) Mikhail Kolyada
  - Ladies' winner: (Russia) Alina Zagitova
  - Pairs winners: China (Sui Wenjing & Han Cong)
  - Ice dance winners: France (Gabriella Papadakis & Guillaume Cizeron)
- November 10 – 12: 2017 NHK Trophy in (Japan) Osaka
  - Men's winner: (Russia) Sergei Voronov
  - Ladies' winner: (Russia) Evgenia Medvedeva
  - Pairs winners: China (Sui Wenjing & Han Cong)
  - Ice dance winners: Canada (Tessa Virtue & Scott Moir)
- November 17 – 19: 2017 Internationaux de France in Grenoble
  - Men's winner: (Spain) Javier Fernández
  - Ladies' winner: (Russia) Alina Zagitova
  - Pairs winners: Russia (Evgenia Tarasova & Vladimir Morozov)
  - Ice dance winners: France (Gabriella Papadakis & Guillaume Cizeron)
- November 24 – 26: 2017 Skate America in Lake Placid, New York
  - Men's winner: (United States) Nathan Chen
  - Ladies' winner: (Japan) Satoko Miyahara
  - Pairs winners: Germany (Aliona Savchenko & Bruno Massot)
  - Ice dance winners: United States (Maia Shibutani & Alex Shibutani)
- December 7 – 10: 2017–18 Grand Prix of Figure Skating Final in (Japan) Nagoya
  - Men's winner: (United States) Nathan Chen
  - Ladies' winner: (Russia) Alina Zagitova
  - Pairs winners: Germany (Aliona Savchenko & Bruno Massot)
  - Ice dance winners: France (Gabriella Papadakis & Guillaume Cizeron)

=== 2017–18 ISU Junior Grand Prix ===
- August 23 – 26: JGP #1 in (Australia) Brisbane
  - Note: There was no junior pairs event here.
  - Junior Men's winner: (United States) Alexei Krasnozhon
  - Junior Ladies' winner: (Russia) Alexandra Trusova
  - Junior Ice Dance winners: Russia (Sofia Polishchuk & Alexander Vakhnov)
- August 31 – September 2: JGP #2 in (Austria) Salzburg
  - Note: There was no junior pairs event here.
  - Junior Men's winner: (United States) Camden Pulkinen
  - Junior Ladies' winner: (Russia) Anastasia Tarakanova
  - Junior Ice Dance winners: United States (Christina Carreira & Anthony Ponomarenko)
- September 6 – 9: JGP #3 in (Latvia) Riga
  - Junior Men's winner: (Japan) Mitsuki Sumoto
  - Junior Ladies' winner: (Russia) Daria Panenkova
  - Junior Pairs winners: Russia (Apollinariia Panfilova & Dmitry Rylov)
  - Junior Ice Dance winners: Russia (Sofia Shevchenko & Igor Eremenko)
- September 20 – 24: JGP #4 in (Belarus) Minsk
  - Junior Men's winner: (Russia) Alexey Erokhov
  - Junior Ladies' winner: (Russia) Alexandra Trusova
  - Junior Pairs winners: Russia (Daria Pavliuchenko & Denis Khodykin)
  - Junior Ice Dance winners: United States (Christina Carreira & Anthony Ponomarenko)
- September 27 – 30: JGP #5 in (Croatia) Zagreb
  - Junior Men's winner: (United States) Alexei Krasnozhon
  - Junior Ladies' winner: (Russia) Sofia Samodurova
  - Junior Pairs winners: Russia (Polina Kostiukovich & Dmitrii Ialin)
  - Junior Ice Dance winners: Canada (Marjorie Lajoie & Zachary Lagha)
- October 4 – 7: JGP #6 in (Poland) Gdańsk
  - Junior Men's winner: (Russia) Alexey Erokhov
  - Junior Ladies' winner: (Russia) Alena Kostornaia
  - Junior Pairs winners: Australia (Ekaterina Alexandrovskaya & Harley Windsor)
  - Junior Ice Dance winners: Russia (Anastasia Skoptsova & Kirill Aleshin)
- October 11 – 14: JGP #7 in (Italy) Bolzano
  - Note: There was no junior pairs event here.
  - Junior Men's winner: (Italy) Matteo Rizzo
  - Junior Ladies' winner: (Russia) Sofia Samodurova
  - Junior Ice Dance winners: Russia (Arina Ushakova & Maxim Nekrasov)
- December 7 – 10: 2017–18 Grand Prix of Figure Skating Final in (Japan) Nagoya
  - Junior Men's winner: (United States) Alexei Krasnozhon
  - Junior Ladies' winner: (Russia) Alexandra Trusova
  - Junior Pairs winners: Australia (Ekaterina Alexandrovskaya & Harley Windsor)
  - Junior Ice Dance winners: Russia (Anastasia Skoptsova & Kirill Aleshin)

== Ice hockey ==
=== 2018 Winter Olympics and Paralympics (Ice hockey) ===
- February 10 – 25: Ice hockey at the 2018 Winter Olympics in (South Korea) Pyeongchang
  - Men's tournament: (gold) OAR; (silver) Germany; (bronze) Canada. The Olympic Athletes from Russia defeated Germany 4–3 in overtime, to win their first Olympic gold medal. Germany gets the silver medal. Canada defeated the Czech Republic 6–4, to win the bronze medal.
  - Women's tournament: (gold) United States; (silver) Canada; (bronze) Finland. The United States defeated Canada 3–2 in shootout, to win their second Olympic gold medal. Canada gets the silver medal. Finland defeated the Olympic Athletes from Russia 3–2, to win the bronze medal.
- March 10 – 18: Para ice hockey at the 2018 Winter Paralympics in Pyeongchang
  - (gold) United States; (silver) Canada; (bronze) South Korea. The United States defeated Canada, 2–1, to win their third consecutive and fourth overall Para ice hockey Paralympic title. Canada won the silver medal. South Korea defeated Italy, 1–0, to win the bronze medal.

=== Kontinental Hockey League ===
- August 21, 2017 – April 22, 2018: 2017–18 KHL season
  - Gagarin Cup: (Russia) Ak Bars defeated fellow Russian team, CSKA Moscow, 4–1 in games played, to win their third Gagarin Cup title.

=== National Hockey League ===
- October 4, 2017 – April 8, 2018: 2017–18 NHL season
  - Presidents' Trophy winners: (Tennessee) Nashville Predators
  - Art Ross Trophy winner: (Ontario) Connor McDavid ( (Alberta) Edmonton Oilers)
- December 16, 2017: NHL 100 Classic at TD Place Stadium in (Canada) Lansdowne Park, Ontario
  - The (Ontario) Ottawa Senators defeated the (Quebec) Montreal Canadiens, 3–0.
- January 1: 2018 NHL Winter Classic at Citi Field in (United States) Flushing, New York
  - The (New York (state)) New York Rangers defeated the (New York (state)) Buffalo Sabres, 3–2 in overtime.
- January 27 – 28: 63rd National Hockey League All-Star Game at Amalie Arena in (United States) Tampa, Florida
  - All-Star Game: The Pacific All-Stars defeated the Atlantic All-Stars, 5–2.
  - All-Star MVP: (Minnesota) Brock Boeser ( (British Columbia) Vancouver Canucks)
  - Fastest Skater Winner: (Ontario) Connor McDavid ( (Alberta) Edmonton Oilers)
  - Passing Challenge Winner: (Ontario) Alex Pietrangelo ( (Missouri) St. Louis Blues)
  - Save Streak Winner: (Quebec) Marc-André Fleury ( (Nevada) Vegas Golden Knights)
  - Puck Control Relay Winner: (New Jersey) Johnny Gaudreau ( (Alberta) Calgary Flames)
  - Hardest Shot Winner: (Russia) Alexander Ovechkin ( (Washington, D.C.) Washington Capitals)
  - Accuracy Shooting Winner: (Minnesota) Brock Boeser ( (British Columbia) Vancouver Canucks)
- March 3: 2018 NHL Stadium Series at Navy–Marine Corps Memorial Stadium in (United States) Annapolis, Maryland
  - The (Washington, D.C.) Washington Capitals defeated the (Ontario) Toronto Maple Leafs, 5–2.
- April 11 – June 7: 2018 Stanley Cup playoffs
  - Eastern Conference Finals: The (Washington, D.C.) Washington Capitals defeated the (Florida) Tampa Bay Lightning, 4–3 (in games series), to win their second Eastern Conference title.
  - Western Conference Finals: The (Nevada) Vegas Golden Knights defeated the (Manitoba) Winnipeg Jets, 4–1 (in games series), to win their first Western Conference title in their inaugural season.
- May 28 – June 7: 2018 Stanley Cup Final
  - The (Washington, D.C.) Washington Capitals defeated the (Nevada) Vegas Golden Knights, 4–1 in games played, to win their first Stanley Cup title.
- June 22 – 23: 2018 NHL entry draft at American Airlines Center in (United States) Dallas, Texas
  - #1: (Sweden) Rasmus Dahlin (to the (New York (state)) Buffalo Sabres from the (Sweden) Frölunda HC)

=== World ice hockey championships ===
- December 4 – 9, 2017, March 17 – 23 & April 7 – 13: 2018 IIHF Women's World Championship Division II in Bled, Valdemoro & Sofia
  - Division IIA: 1st: Netherlands (22nd overall); 2nd: Great Britain (23rd overall); 3rd: North Korea (24th overall); 4th: Australia (25th overall); 5th: Slovenia (26th overall); 6th: Mexico (27th overall).
    Note: The Netherlands promoted to the 2019 IIHF Women's World Championship Division I Group B.
  - Division IIB: 1st: Spain (28th overall); 2nd: Chinese Taipei (29th overall); 3rd: Iceland (30th overall); 4th: New Zealand (31st overall); 5th: Turkey (32nd overall); 6th: Romania (33rd overall).
    Note: Spain promoted to the 2019 IIHF Women's World Championship Division II Group A.
  - Division IIBQ: 1st: Croatia (34th overall); 2nd: Belgium (35th overall); 3rd: South Africa (36th overall); 4th: Hong Kong (37th overall); 5th: Bulgaria (38th overall).
    Note: Croatia promoted to the 2019 IIHF Women's World Championship Division II Group B.
- December 26, 2017 – January 5: 2018 World Junior Ice Hockey Championships in Buffalo
  - (gold) Canada; (silver) Sweden; (bronze) United States. Canada defeated Sweden 3–1, to win their 17th World Junior Ice Hockey Championship title. The United States won the bronze medal.
- January 6 – 13: 2018 IIHF World Women's U18 Championship in (Russia) Dmitrov
  - (gold) United States; (silver) Sweden; (bronze) Canada. The United States defeated Sweden 9–3, to win their 7th IIHF World Women's U18 Championship title. Canada won the bronze medal.
- February 25 – 28 & April 16 – 22: 2018 IIHF World Championship Division III in Cape Town & Sarajevo
  - Division III: 1st: Georgia (41st overall); 2nd: Bulgaria (42nd overall); 3rd: Turkey (43rd overall); 4th: Chinese Taipei (44th overall); 5th: South Africa (45th overall); 6th: Hong Kong (46th overall).
    Note 1: Georgia promoted to the 2019 IIHF World Championship Division II Group B.
    Note 2: Hong Kong relegated to the 2019 IIHF World Championship Division III Qualification.
  - Division IIIQ: 1st: Turkmenistan (47th overall); 2nd: Bosnia and Herzegovina (48th overall); 3rd: United Arab Emirates (49th overall); 4th: Kuwait (50th overall).
    Note: Turkmenistan promoted to the 2019 IIHF World Championship Division III.
- April 8 – 14: 2018 IIHF Women's World Championship Division I in Vaujany & Asiago
  - Division IA: 1st: France (10th overall); 2nd: Australia (11th overall); 3rd: Hungary (12th overall); 4th: Denmark (13th overall); 5th: Norway (14th overall); 6th: Slovakia (15th overall).
    Note: France promoted to the 2019 IIHF Women's World Championship Top Division.
  - Division IB: 1st: Italy (16th overall); 2nd: South Korea (17th overall); 3rd: Latvia (18th overall); 4th: Kazakhstan (19th overall); 5th: China (20th overall); 6th: Poland (21st overall).
    Note: Italy promoted to the 2019 IIHF Women's World Championship Division I Group A.
- April 14 – 20 & 23 – 29: 2018 IIHF World Championship Division II in (Netherlands) Tilburg & Granada
  - Division IIB: 1st: Spain (35th overall); 2nd: New Zealand (36th overall); 3rd: Israel (37th overall); 4th: North Korea (38th overall); 5th: Mexico (39th overall); 6th: Luxembourg (40th overall).
    Note 1: Spain promoted to the 2019 IIHF World Championship Division II Group A.
    Note 2: Luxembourg relegated to the 2019 IIHF World Championship Division III.
- April 19 – 29: 2018 IIHF World U18 Championships in (Russia) Chelyabinsk & Magnitogorsk
  - (gold) Finland; (silver) United States; (bronze) Sweden. Finland defeated the United States, 3–2, to win their 4th IIHF World U18 Championship title. Sweden won the bronze medal.
- April 22 – 28: 2018 IIHF World Championship Division I in Budapest & Kaunas
  - Division IA: 1st: Great Britain (17th overall); 2nd: Italy (18th overall); 3rd: Kazakhstan (19th overall); 4th: Hungary (20th overall); 5th: Slovenia (21st overall); 6th: Poland (22nd overall).
    Note 1: Great Britain and Italy promoted to the 2019 IIHF World Championship Top Division.
    Note 2: Poland relegated to the 2019 IIHF World Championship Division I Group B.
  - Division IB: 1st: Lithuania (23rd overall); 2nd: Japan (24th overall); 3rd: Estonia (25th overall); 4th: Ukraine (26th overall); 5th: Romania (27th overall); 6th: Croatia (28th overall).
    Note 1: Lithuania promoted to the 2019 IIHF World Championship Division I Group A.
    Note 2: Croatia relegated to the 2019 IIHF World Championship Division II Group A.
- May 4 – 20: 2018 IIHF World Championship in (Denmark) Copenhagen & Herning
  - (gold) Sweden; (silver) Switzerland; (bronze) United States. Sweden defeated Switzerland 3–2 in shootout, to win their second consecutive and 11th IIHF World Championship title. Switzerland gets the silver medal. The United States defeated Canada 4–1, to win the bronze medal.
    Note: Belarus and South Korea relegated to the 2019 IIHF World Championship Division I Group A.

=== Europe ===
IIHF Continental Cup

- September 29, 2017 – January 14, 2018: 2017–18 IIHF Continental Cup
  - Champions: (Belarus) Yunost Minsk; Runner-ups: (Kazakhstan) Nomad Astana; Third: (United Kingdom) Sheffield Steelers; Fourth: (Italy) Ritten Sport.
    Note: Yunost Minsk has qualified to compete at the 2018–19 Champions Hockey League.

Champions Hockey League

- August 24, 2017 – February 6, 2018: 2017–18 Champions Hockey League
  - (Finland) JYP Jyväskylä defeated (Sweden) Växjö Lakers, 2–0, to win their first Champions Hockey League title.

=== Asia ===
IIHF Challenge Cup of Asia

- December 12 – 17, 2017: 2018 IIHF U20 Challenge Cup of Asia in Kuala Lumpur
  - (gold) Malaysia; (silver) Kyrgyzstan; (bronze) United Arab Emirates.
- March 6 – 9: 2018 IIHF Women's Challenge Cup of Asia Division I in Kuala Lumpur
  - (gold) Malaysia; (silver) United Arab Emirates; (bronze) Philippines.
- March 8 – 11: 2018 IIHF Women's Challenge Cup of Asia in (Malaysia) Kuala Lumpur
  - (gold) Chinese Taipei U18; (silver) New Zealand U18; (bronze) Thailand.
- March 24 – 29: 2018 IIHF Challenge Cup of Asia Division I in Kuala Lumpur
  - (gold) Malaysia; (silver) Macau; (bronze) Indonesia.
- April 3 – 8: 2018 IIHF Challenge Cup of Asia in Pasay, Metro Manila
  - (gold) Mongolia; (silver) Thailand; (bronze) Philippines.

Asia League Ice Hockey

- September 2 – December 24, 2017: 2017–18 Asia League Ice Hockey season

=== North America ===
==== Junior ====
OHL/QMJHL/WHL

- September 21, 2017 – March 18: 2017–18 OHL season
  - Eastern Conference title winners: Hamilton Bulldogs
  - Western Conference title winners: Sault Ste. Marie Greyhounds
    - March 22 – May 13: J. Ross Robertson Cup
      - The Hamilton Bulldogs defeated the Sault Ste. Marie Greyhounds, 4–2 in games played, to win their first J. Ross Robertson Cup title.
- September 21, 2017 – March 18: 2017–18 QMJHL season
  - West Division & Jean Rougeau Trophy winners: (Quebec) Blainville-Boisbriand Armada
  - East Division winners: (Quebec) Rimouski Océanic
  - Maritimes Division winners: (New Brunswick) Acadie–Bathurst Titan
    - March 22 – May 13: President's Cup
      - The (New Brunswick) Acadie–Bathurst Titan defeated the (Quebec) Blainville-Boisbriand Armada, 4–2 in games played, to win their second President's Cup title.
- September 22, 2017 – March 18: 2017–18 WHL season
  - East Division & Conference winners: (Saskatchewan) Moose Jaw Warriors
  - Central Division winners: (Alberta) Medicine Hat Tigers
  - British Columbia Division winners: Kelowna Rockets
  - USA Division winners: (Washington (state)) Everett Silvertips
    - March 22 – May 13: Ed Chynoweth Cup
      - The (Saskatchewan) Swift Current Broncos defeated the (Washington (state)) Everett Silvertips, 4–2 in games played, to win their third Ed Chynoweth Cup title.
- May 18 – 27: 2018 Memorial Cup at Brandt Centre in (Canada) Regina, Saskatchewan
  - The (New Brunswick) Acadie–Bathurst Titan defeated the (Saskatchewan) Regina Pats, 3–0, to win their first Memorial Cup title.

==== College ====
NCAA (Division I)

- March 10 – 18: 2018 NCAA National Collegiate Women's Ice Hockey Tournament (Frozen Four at Ridder Arena in (United States) Minneapolis, Minnesota)
  - The (New York (state)) Clarkson Golden Knights defeated the (New York (state)) Colgate Raiders, 2–1 in overtime, to win their second consecutive and third NCAA Division I Women's Ice Hockey national title.
- March 23 – April 7: 2018 NCAA Division I Men's Ice Hockey Tournament (Frozen Four at Xcel Energy Center in (United States) St. Paul, Minnesota)
  - The Minnesota–Duluth Bulldogs defeated the (Indiana) Notre Dame Fighting Irish, 2–1, to win their second NCAA Division I Men's Ice Hockey national title.

==== Women's ====
Clarkson Cup

- March 25: 2018 Clarkson Cup in (Canada) Toronto, Ontario
  - The (Ontario) Markham Thunder defeated the (China) Kunlun Red Star, 2–1 in overtime, to win their first Clarkson Cup title.

National Women's Hockey League

- March 25: 2018 Isobel Cup in (United States) Newark, New Jersey
  - The (New Jersey) Metropolitan Riveters defeated the (New York (state)) Buffalo Beauts, 1–0, to win their first Isobel Cup title.

==== Senior ====
Allan Cup

- April 9 – 14: 2018 Allan Cup in (Saskatchewan) Rosetown
  - The (Ontario) Stoney Creek Generals defeated the (Alberta) Lacombe Generals, 7–4, to win their first Allan Cup title.

=== Other ice hockey tournaments ===
Development Cup

- September 30 – October 1, 2017: 2017 Development Cup in (Andorra) Canillo
  - (gold) Morocco; (silver) Ireland; (bronze) Portugal. Morocco defeated Ireland, 11–4, to win their first Development Cup title.

== Luge ==
=== 2018 Winter Olympics (Luge) ===
- February 10 – 15: Luge at the 2018 Winter Olympics in (South Korea) Pyeongchang
  - Men's singles winners: (gold) (Austria) David Gleirscher; (silver) (United States) Chris Mazdzer; (bronze) (Germany) Johannes Ludwig
  - Women's singles winners: (gold) (Germany) Natalie Geisenberger; (silver) (Germany) Dajana Eitberger; (bronze) (Canada) Alex Gough
  - Men's doubles winners: (gold) Germany (Tobias Wendl & Tobias Arlt); (silver) Austria (Peter Penz & Georg Fischler); (bronze) Germany (Toni Eggert & Sascha Benecken)
  - Team relay winners: (gold) Germany; (silver) Canada; (bronze) Austria

=== International luge events ===
- December 1, 2017: 2017 Asian Luge Championships in (Germany) Altenberg
  - Men's singles: (India) Shiva Keshavan
  - Women's singles: (South Korea) Sung Eun-ryung
  - Men's doubles: South Korea (Park Jin-yong & Cho Jung-myung)
- December 8 & 9, 2017: 2017 America Pacific Luge Championships in Calgary
  - Men's singles: (Canada) Samuel Edney
  - Women's singles: (Canada) Alex Gough
  - Men's doubles: Canada (Tristan Walker & Justin Snith)
- January 20 & 21: 2018 Junior America-Pacific Championships in (Germany) Winterberg
  - Junior Men's singles: (Canada) Nicholas Klimchuk-Brown
  - Junior Women's singles: (Canada) Carolyn Maxwell
  - Junior Men's doubles: Canada (Nicholas Klimchuk-Brown & Daniel Shippit Adam)
- January 20 & 21: 2018 Junior European Luge Championships in (Germany) Winterberg
  - Junior Men's singles: (Germany) Max Langenhan
  - Junior Women's singles: (Germany) Cheyenne Rosenthal
  - Junior Men's doubles: Russia (Dmitriy Buchnev & Daniil Kilseev)
- February 2 & 3: 2018 Junior World Luge Championships in (Germany) Altenberg
  - Junior Men's singles: (Germany) Max Langenhan
  - Junior Women's singles: (Germany) Jessica Tiebel
  - Junior Men's doubles: Italy (Ivan Nagler & Fabian Malleier)
- February 3 & 4: 2018 Junior World Natural Track Luge Championships in (Italy) Laas, South Tyrol
  - Junior Men's singles: (Austria) Fabian Achenrainer
  - Junior Women's singles: (Italy) Alexandra Pfattner
  - Junior Men's doubles: Austria (Fabian Achenrainer & Miguel Brugger)
- February 9 – 11: 2018 FIL Natural Track European Luge Championships in (Austria) Obdach-Winterleiten
  - Men's singles: (Austria) Thomas Kammerlander
  - Women's singles: (Italy) Evelin Lanthaler
  - Men's doubles: Italy (Patrick Pigneter & Florian Clara)

=== 2017–18 Luge World Cup ===
- November 18 & 19, 2017: LWC #1 in (Austria) Innsbruck
  - Men's singles: (Russia) Semen Pavlichenko
  - Women's singles: (Germany) Natalie Geisenberger
  - Men's doubles: Germany (Toni Eggert & Sascha Benecken)
- November 25 & 26, 2017: LWC #2 in Winterberg
  - Men's singles: (Italy) Kevin Fischnaller
  - Women's singles: (Germany) Natalie Geisenberger
  - Men's doubles: Germany (Toni Eggert & Sascha Benecken)
- December 2 & 3, 2017: LWC #3 in Altenberg
  - Men's singles: (Germany) Felix Loch
  - Women's singles: (Germany) Natalie Geisenberger
  - Men's doubles: Germany (Toni Eggert & Sascha Benecken)
- December 8 & 9, 2017: LWC #4 in (Canada) Calgary
  - Men's singles: (Germany) Felix Loch
  - Women's singles: (Germany) Tatjana Hüfner
  - Men's doubles: Germany (Toni Eggert & Sascha Benecken)
- December 15 & 16, 2017: LWC #5 in (United States) Lake Placid
  - Men's singles: (Russia) Roman Repilov
  - Women's singles: (Germany) Natalie Geisenberger
  - Men's doubles: Germany (Toni Eggert & Sascha Benecken)
- January 6 & 7: LWC #6 in Schönau am Königsee
  - Men's singles: (Austria) Wolfgang Kindl
  - Women's singles: (Germany) Natalie Geisenberger
  - Men's doubles: Germany (Tobias Wendl & Tobias Arlt)
- January 13 & 14: LWC #7 in Oberhof
  - Men's singles: (Germany) Felix Loch
  - Women's singles: (Germany) Dajana Eitberger
  - Men's doubles: Germany (Toni Eggert & Sascha Benecken)
- January 20 & 21: LWC #8 in (Norway) Lillehammer
  - Men's singles: (Italy) Dominik Fischnaller
  - Women's singles: (United States) Summer Britcher
  - Men's doubles: Germany (Toni Eggert & Sascha Benecken)
- January 27 & 28: LWC #9 (final) in (Latvia) Sigulda
  - Men's singles: (Russia) Semen Pavlichenko
  - Women's singles: (Russia) Tatiana Ivanova
  - Men's doubles: Germany (Toni Eggert & Sascha Benecken)

=== 2017–18 Team Relay Luge World Cup ===
- November 18 & 19, 2017: TRLWC #1 in (Austria) Innsbruck
  - Winners: Germany (Natalie Geisenberger, Felix Loch, Toni Eggert, & Sascha Benecken)
- December 2 & 3, 2017: TRLWC #2 in Altenberg
  - Winners: Germany (Natalie Geisenberger, Felix Loch, Toni Eggert, & Sascha Benecken)
- December 8 & 9, 2017: TRLWC #3 in (Canada) Calgary
  - Winners: Germany (Tatjana Hüfner, Felix Loch, Toni Eggert, & Sascha Benecken)
- January 6 & 7: TRLWC #4 in (Germany) Schönau am Königsee
  - Winners: Italy (Andrea Vötter, Dominik Fischnaller, Ivan Nagler, & Fabian Malleier)
- January 13 & 14: TRLWC #5 in Oberhof
  - Winners: Germany (Dajana Eitberger, Felix Loch, Toni Eggert, & Sascha Benecken)
- January 27 & 28: TRLWC #6 (final) in (Latvia) Sigulda
  - Winners: Russia (Tatiana Ivanova, Semen Pavlichenko, Alexander Denisyev, & Vladislav Antonov)

=== 2017–18 Sprint Luge World Cup ===
- November 25 & 26, 2017: SLWC #1 in Winterberg
  - Men's singles: (Germany) Felix Loch
  - Women's singles: (United States) Emily Sweeney
  - Men's doubles: Germany (Tobias Wendl & Tobias Arlt)
- December 15 & 16, 2017: SLWC #2 in (United States) Lake Placid
  - Men's singles: (Austria) Wolfgang Kindl
  - Women's singles: (Germany) Dajana Eitberger
  - Men's doubles: Germany (Toni Eggert & Sascha Benecken)
- January 20 & 21: SLWC #2 in (Norway) Lillehammer
  - Men's singles: (Russia) Semen Pavlichenko
  - Women's singles: (United States) Summer Britcher
  - Men's doubles: Austria (Peter Penz & Georg Fischler)
- January 27 & 28: SLWC #3 (final) in (Latvia) Sigulda
  - Men's singles: (Russia) Roman Repilov
  - Women's singles: (Russia) Tatiana Ivanova
  - Men's doubles: Germany (Toni Eggert & Sascha Benecken)

=== 2017–18 Natural Track Luge World Cup ===
- December 2 & 3, 2017: NTLWC #1 in (Austria) Kühtai
  - Men's singles: (Austria) Thomas Kammerlander
  - Women's singles: (Italy) Greta Pinggera
  - Men's doubles: Italy (Patrick Pigneter & Florian Clara)
- January 5 – 7: NTLWC #2 in Latzfons
  - Men's singles: (Italy) Patrick Pigneter
  - Women's singles: (Italy) Evelin Lanthaler
  - Men's doubles: Italy (Patrick Pigneter & Florian Clara)
- January 11 – 14: NTLWC #3 in Passeiertal
  - Men's singles: (Italy) Alex Gruber
  - Women's singles: (Italy) Evelin Lanthaler
  - Men's doubles: Italy (Patrick Pigneter & Florian Clara)
- January 19 – 21: NTLWC #4 in (Austria) Saint Sebastian
  - Men's singles: (Austria) Thomas Kammerlander
  - Women's singles: (Italy) Evelin Lanthaler
  - Men's doubles: Italy (Patrick Pigneter & Florian Clara)
- January 26 – 28: NTLWC #5 in (Italy) Deutschnofen
  - Men's singles: (Italy) Alex Gruber
  - Women's singles: (Italy) Greta Pinggera
  - Men's doubles: Austria (Rupert Brueggler & Tobias Angerer)
- February 15 – 17: NTLWC #6 (final) in (Austria) Umhausen
  - Men's singles: (Austria) Thomas Kammerlander
  - Women's singles: (Italy) Evelin Lanthaler
  - Men's doubles: Italy (Patrick Pigneter & Florian Clara)

== Speed skating ==
=== 2018 Winter Olympics (Speed skating) ===
- February 10 – 22: Short track speed skating at the 2018 Winter Olympics in Pyeongchang
  - Men's 500 m winners: (gold) (China) Wu Dajing (WR); (silver) (South Korea) Hwang Dae-heon; (bronze) (South Korea) Lim Hyo-jun
  - Women's 500 m winners: (gold) (Italy) Arianna Fontana; (silver) (Netherlands) Yara van Kerkhof; (bronze) (Canada) Kim Boutin
  - Men's 1000 m winners: (gold) (Canada) Samuel Girard; (silver) (United States) John-Henry Krueger; (bronze) (South Korea) Seo Yi-ra
  - Women's 1000 m winners: (gold) (Netherlands) Suzanne Schulting; (silver) (Canada) Kim Boutin; (bronze) (Italy) Arianna Fontana
  - Men's 1500 m winners: (gold) (South Korea) Lim Hyo-jun; (silver) (Netherlands) Sjinkie Knegt; (bronze) (International Olympic Committee) Semion Elistratov
  - Women's 1500 m winners: (gold) (South Korea) Choi Min-jeong; (silver) (China) Li Jinyu; (bronze) (Canada) Kim Boutin
  - Men's 5000 m Relay winners: (gold) Hungary (OR); (silver) China; (bronze) Canada
  - Women's 3000 m Relay winners: (gold) South Korea; (silver) Italy; (bronze) Netherlands
- February 10 – 24: Speed skating at the 2018 Winter Olympics in Pyeongchang
  - Men's 500 m winners: (gold) (Norway) Håvard Holmefjord Lorentzen (OR); (silver) (South Korea) Cha Min-kyu; (bronze) (China) Gao Tingyu
  - Women's 500 m winners: (gold) (Japan) Nao Kodaira (OR); (silver) (South Korea) Lee Sang-hwa; (bronze) (Czech Republic) Karolína Erbanová
  - Men's 1000 m winners: (gold) (Netherlands) Kjeld Nuis; (silver) (Norway) Håvard Holmefjord Lorentzen; (bronze) (South Korea) Kim Tae-yun
  - Women's 1000 m winners: (gold) (Netherlands) Jorien ter Mors (OR); (silver) (Japan) Nao Kodaira; (bronze) (Japan) Miho Takagi
  - Men's 1500 m winners: (gold) (Netherlands) Kjeld Nuis; (silver) (Netherlands) Patrick Roest; (bronze) (South Korea) Kim Min-seok
  - Women's 1500 m winners: (gold) (Netherlands) Ireen Wüst; (silver) (Japan) Miho Takagi; (bronze) (Netherlands) Marrit Leenstra
  - Women's 3000 m winners: (gold) (Netherlands) Carlijn Achtereekte; (silver) (Netherlands) Ireen Wüst; (bronze) (Netherlands) Antoinette de Jong
  - Men's 5000 m winners: (gold) (Netherlands) Sven Kramer (OR); (silver) (Canada) Ted-Jan Bloemen; (bronze) (Norway) Sverre Lunde Pedersen
  - Women's 5000 m winners: (gold) (Netherlands) Esmee Visser; (silver) (Czech Republic) Martina Sáblíková; (bronze) (International Olympic Committee) Natalya Voronina
  - Men's 10000 m winners: (gold) (Canada) Ted-Jan Bloemen (OR); (silver) (Netherlands) Jorrit Bergsma; (bronze) (Italy) Nicola Tumolero
  - Men's Mass Start winners: (gold) (South Korea) Lee Seung-hoon; (silver) (Belgium) Bart Swings; (bronze) (Netherlands) Koen Verweij
  - Women's Mass Start winners: (gold) (Japan) Nana Takagi; (silver) (South Korea) Kim Bo-reum; (bronze) (Netherlands) Irene Schouten
  - Men's Team Pursuit winners: (gold) Norway; (silver) South Korea; (bronze) Netherlands
  - Women's Team Pursuit winners: (gold) Japan (OR); (silver) Netherlands; (bronze) United States

=== 2017–18 ISU Speed Skating World Cup ===
- November 10 – 12, 2017: SSWC #1 in (Netherlands) Heerenveen
  - 500 m #1 winners: (Norway) Håvard Holmefjord Lorentzen (m) / (Japan) Nao Kodaira (f)
  - 500 m #2 winners: (Canada) Laurent Dubreuil (m) / (Japan) Nao Kodaira (f)
  - 1000 m winners: (Russia) Pavel Kulizhnikov (m) / (Japan) Nao Kodaira (f)
  - 1500 m winners: (Russia) Denis Yuskov (m) / (Japan) Miho Takagi (f)
  - Men's 5000 m winner: (Netherlands) Sven Kramer
  - Women's 3000 m winner: (Netherlands) Antoinette de Jong
  - Team Pursuit winners: South Korea (m) / Japan (f)
  - Team Sprint winners: Canada (m) / Russia (f)
  - Mass Start winners: (South Korea) Lee Seung-hoon (m) / (Japan) Ayano Sato (f)
- November 17 – 19, 2017: SSWC #2 in (Norway) Stavanger
  - 500 m #1 winners: (Norway) Håvard Holmefjord Lorentzen (m) / (Japan) Nao Kodaira (f)
  - 500 m #2 winners: (Netherlands) Ronald Mulder (m) / (Japan) Nao Kodaira (f)
  - 1000 m winners: (Norway) Håvard Holmefjord Lorentzen (m) / (Japan) Nao Kodaira (f)
  - 1500 m winners: (Norway) Sverre Lunde Pedersen (m) / (Japan) Miho Takagi (f)
  - Men's 10,000 m winner: (Netherlands) Sven Kramer
  - Women's 5000 m winner: (Germany) Claudia Pechstein
  - Team Sprint winners: Canada (m) (World Record) / South Korea (f)
- December 1 – 3, 2017: SSWC #3 in Calgary
  - 500 m winners: (Canada) Alex Boisvert-Lacroix (m) / (Japan) Nao Kodaira (f)
  - 1000 m winners: (Netherlands) Kai Verbij (m) / (United States) Heather Bergsma (f)
  - 1500 m winners: (Russia) Denis Yuskov (m) / (Japan) Miho Takagi (f)
  - Men's 5000 m winner: (Netherlands) Sven Kramer
  - Women's 3000 m winner: (Japan) Miho Takagi
  - Team Pursuit winners: Netherlands (m) / Japan (f)
  - Team Sprint winners: Canada (m) / Russia (f)
  - Mass Start winners: (Italy) Andrea Giovannini (m) / (Germany) Claudia Pechstein (f)
- December 8 – 10, 2017: SSWC #4 in (United States) Salt Lake City
  - 500 m #1 winners: (Canada) Alex Boisvert-Lacroix (m) / (Japan) Nao Kodaira (f)
  - 500 m #2 winners: (Russia) Ruslan Murashov (m) / (Japan) Nao Kodaira (f)
  - 1000 m winners: (Russia) Denis Yuskov (m) / (Japan) Nao Kodaira (f)
  - 1500 m winners: (Russia) Denis Yuskov (m) / (Japan) Miho Takagi (f)
  - Men's 5000 m winner: (Canada) Ted-Jan Bloemen
  - Women's 3000 m winner: (Russia) Natalya Voronina
  - Team Pursuit winners: Canada (m) / Japan (f)
  - Mass Start winners: (South Korea) Lee Seung-hoon (m) / (Italy) Francesca Lollobrigida (f)
- January 19 – 21: SSWC #5 in (Germany) Erfurt
  - 500 m #1 winners: (Russia) Pavel Kulizhnikov (m) / (Czech Republic) Karolína Erbanová (f)
  - 500 m #2 winners: (Norway) Håvard Holmefjord Lorentzen (m) / (Austria) Vanessa Herzog (f)
  - 1000 m #1 winners: (Netherlands) Kjeld Nuis (m) / (Netherlands) Jorien ter Mors (f)
  - 1000 m #2 winners: (Netherlands) Kjeld Nuis (m) / (Austria) Vanessa Herzog (f)
  - 1500 m winners: (Russia) Denis Yuskov (m) / (Netherlands) Ireen Wüst (f)
  - Men's 5000 m winner: (Norway) Sverre Lunde Pedersen
  - Women's 3000 m winner: (Canada) Ivanie Blondin
- March 17 & 18: SSWC #6 (final) in (Belarus) Minsk
  - 500 m #1 winners: (Netherlands) Hein Otterspeer (m) / (Czech Republic) Karolína Erbanová (f)
  - 500 m #2 winners: (Netherlands) Jan Smeekens (m) / (Russia) Angelina Golikova (f)
  - 1000 m winners: (Netherlands) Kjeld Nuis (m) / (Netherlands) Marrit Leenstra (f)
  - 1500 m winners: (Norway) Sverre Lunde Pedersen (m) / (Japan) Miho Takagi (f)
  - Men's 5000 m winner: (Norway) Sverre Lunde Pedersen
  - Women's 3000 m winner: (Netherlands) Antoinette de Jong
  - Team Pursuit winners: Norway (m) / Japan (f)
  - Team Sprint winners: Norway (m) / Russia (f)
  - Mass Start winners: (Netherlands) Simon Schouten (m) / (Japan) Ayano Sato (f)

=== Other long track speed skating events ===
- January 5 – 7: 2018 European Speed Skating Championships in Kolomna
  - 500 m winners: (Netherlands) Ronald Mulder (m) / (Austria) Vanessa Herzog (f)
  - 1000 m winners: (Russia) Pavel Kulizhnikov (m) / (Russia) Yekaterina Shikhova (f)
  - 1500 m winners: (Russia) Denis Yuskov (m) / (Netherlands) Lotte van Beek (f)
  - Women's 3000 m winner: (Netherlands) Esmee Visser
  - Men's 5000 m winner: (Italy) Nicola Tumolero
  - Team Pursuit winners: Netherlands (m) / Netherlands (f)
  - Team Sprint winners: Russia (m) / Russia (f)
  - Mass Start winners: (Netherlands) Jan Blokhuijsen (m) / (Italy) Francesca Lollobrigida (f)
- March 3 & 4: 2018 ISU World Sprint Speed Skating Championships in (China) Changchun
  - 500 m winners: (Norway) Håvard Holmefjord Lorentzen (m; 2 times) / (Japan) Nao Kodaira (f; 2 times)
  - 1000 m winners: (Netherlands) Kjeld Nuis (m; 2 times) / (Netherlands) Jorien ter Mors (f; 2 times)
- March 9 – 11: 2018 ISU World Allround Speed Skating Championships in (Netherlands) Amsterdam
  - 500 m winners: (Netherlands) Patrick Roest (m) / (Japan) Miho Takagi
  - 1500 m winners: (Norway) Sverre Lunde Pedersen (m) / (Japan) Miho Takagi (f)
  - 5000 m winners: (Norway) Sverre Lunde Pedersen (m) / (Netherlands) Ireen Wüst (f)
  - Men's 10,000 m winner: (Sweden) Nils van der Poel
  - Women's 3000 m winner: (Netherlands) Ireen Wüst
  - Overall winners: (Netherlands) Patrick Roest (m) / (Japan) Miho Takagi (f)
- March 21 – 25: 2018 World University Speed Skating Championship in (Belarus) Minsk
  - 500 m winners: (Japan) Tatsuya Shinhama (m) / (Japan) Miku Asano (f)
  - 1000 m winners: (Japan) Tatsuya Shinhama (m) / (Japan) Rio Yamada (f)
  - 1500 m winners: (Kazakhstan) Ivan Arzhanikov (m) / (Japan) Rio Yamada (f)
  - 5000 m winners: (Italy) Davide Ghiotto (m) / (Poland) Magdalena Czyszczon (f)
  - Men's 10,000 m winner: (Italy) Davide Ghiotto
  - Women's 3000 m winner: (Poland) Magdalena Czyszczon
  - Team Pursuit winners: Italy (m) / Netherlands (f)
  - Team Sprint winners: Russia (m) / Russia (f)
  - Mass Start winners: (Belarus) Ignat Golovatsiuk (m) / (Poland) Magdalena Czyszczon (f)

=== 2017–18 ISU Short Track Speed Skating World Cup ===
- September 28 – October 1, 2017: STWC #1 in (Hungary) Budapest at BOK Hall
  - 500 m winners: (Hungary) Sándor Liu Shaolin (m) / (South Korea) Choi Min-jeong (f)
  - 1000 m winners: (South Korea) LIM Hyo-jun (m) / (South Korea) Choi Min-jeong (f)
  - 1500 m winners: (South Korea) LIM Hyo-jun (m) / (South Korea) Choi Min-jeong (f)
  - Men's 5000 m Relay winners: Canada (Charles Hamelin, Charle Cournoyer, Samuel Girard, and Pascal Dion)
  - Women's 3000 m Relay winners: South Korea (Shim Suk-hee, Kim A-lang, Choi Min-jeong, and KIM Ye-jin)
  - Team Classification: South Korea (m) / South Korea (f)
- October 5 – 8, 2017: STWC #2 in (Netherlands) Dordrecht at the Sportboulevard
  - 500 m winners: (Canada) Samuel Girard (m) / (Canada) Marianne St-Gelais (f)
  - 1000 m winners: (Netherlands) Sjinkie Knegt (m) / (South Korea) Shim Suk-hee (f)
  - 1500 m winners: (South Korea) HWANG Dae-heon (m) / (South Korea) Choi Min-jeong (f)
  - Men's 5000 m winners: Canada (Samuel Girard, Charles Hamelin, Charle Cournoyer, and Pascal Dion)
  - Women's 3000 m winners: China (ZANG Yize, Han Yutong, Fan Kexin, and Zhou Yang)
  - Team Classification: Canada (m) / South Korea (f)
- November 9 – 12, 2017: STWC #3 in (China) Shanghai at the Oriental Sports Center
  - 500 m winners: (China) Wu Dajing (m) / (Canada) Kim Boutin (f)
  - 1000 m winners: (China) Wu Dajing (m) / (Canada) Kim Boutin (f)
  - 1500 m winners: (South Korea) HWANG Dae-heon (m) / (South Korea) Shim Suk-hee (f)
  - Men's 5000 m winners: United States (Thomas Insuk Hong, J. R. Celski, John-Henry Krueger, and Keith Carroll) (World Record)
  - Women's 3000 m winners: South Korea (Choi Min-jeong, Shim Suk-hee, KIM Ye-jin, and LEE Yu-bin)
  - Team Classification: South Korea (m) / Canada (f)
- November 16 – 19, 2017: STWC #4 (final) in Seoul at the Mokdong Icerink
  - 500 m winners: (China) Wu Dajing (m) / (United Kingdom) Elise Christie (f)
  - 1000 m winners: (Hungary) Sándor Liu Shaolin (m) / (South Korea) Choi Min-jeong (f)
  - 1500 m winners: (Canada) Charles Hamelin (m) / (South Korea) Choi Min-jeong (f)
  - Men's 5000 m winners: South Korea (KIM Do-kyoum, LIM Hyo-jun, SEO Yi-ra, & Kwak Yoon-gy
  - Women's 3000 m winners: Netherlands (Suzanne Schulting, Rianne de Vries, Yara van Kerkhof, & Lara van Ruijven)
  - Team Classification: South Korea (m) / South Korea (f)

=== Other short track speed skating events ===
- January 12 – 14: 2018 European Short Track Speed Skating Championships in (Germany) Dresden
  - 500 m winners: (Netherlands) Sjinkie Knegt (m) / (Italy) Martina Valcepina (f)
  - 1000 m winners: (Netherlands) Sjinkie Knegt (m) / (Italy) Arianna Fontana (f)
  - 1500 m winners: (Netherlands) Sjinkie Knegt (m) / (Italy) Martina Valcepina (f)
  - 3000 m SF winners: (Israel) Vladislav Bykanov (m) / (Russia) Sofia Prosvirnova (f)
  - Women's 3000 m relay winners: Russia (Tatiana Borodulina, Emina Malagich, Sofia Prosvirnova, & Ekaterina Efremenkova)
  - Men's 5000 m relay winners: Netherlands (Daan Breeuwsma, Sjinkie Knegt, Itzhak de Laat, & Dennis Visser)
  - Overall classification: (Netherlands) Sjinkie Knegt (m) / (Italy) Arianna Fontana (f)
- March 16 – 18: 2018 World Short Track Speed Skating Championships in (Canada) Montreal
  - 500 m winners: (South Korea) Hwang Dae-heon (m) / (South Korea) Choi Min-jeong (f)
  - 1000 m winners: (Canada) Charles Hamelin (m) / (South Korea) Shim Suk-hee (f)
  - 1500 m winners: (Canada) Charles Hamelin (m) / (South Korea) Choi Min-jeong (f)
  - 3000 m SF winners: (Hungary) Shaolin Sándor Liu (m) / (South Korea) Choi Min-jeong (f)
  - Women's 3000 m relay winners: South Korea (Shim Suk-hee, Kim A-lang, Choi Min-jeong, & Kim Ye-jin)
  - Men's 5000 m relay winners: South Korea (Kwak Yoon-gy, Kim Do-kyoum, Hwang Dae-heon, & Lim Hyo-jun)
  - Overall classification: (Canada) Charles Hamelin (m) / (South Korea) Choi Min-jeong (f)

== See also ==
- 2018 in skiing
- 2018 in sports
