= 2022 IIHF U20 Asia and Oceania Championship =

Tournament details
- Host country: Thailand
- City: Bangkok
- Venue: 1 (in 1 host city)
- Dates: 25 June – 2 July 2022
- Teams: 8

Final positions
- Champions: Thailand (1st title)
- Runners-up: Singapore
- Third place: Hong Kong

Tournament statistics
- Games played: 20
- Goals scored: 227 (11.35 per game)
- Attendance: 3,945 (197 per game)
- Scoring leader: (Singapore) Joshua Chan (19 points)

Awards
- MVP: (Singapore) Joshua Chan

Official website
- IIHF.com

The 2022 IIHF U20 Asia and Oceania Championship was an international men's under-20 ice hockey tournament organized by the International Ice Hockey Federation (IIHF). The tournament took place between 25 June and 2 July at Thailand International Ice Hockey Arena in Bangkok, Thailand, and was the sixth edition held since its formation in 2012 under the IIHF Asia and Oceania Championship series of tournaments. To be eligible as a "junior" player in this tournament, a player cannot be born earlier than 2002.

Thailand won its first U20 Asia and Oceania Championship and its first gold medal ever on home ice after defeating Singapore 4–3 in the gold medal game. Hong Kong won the bronze medal after a 6–5 victory over the United Arab Emirates. Malaysia finished in 5th place, while the Philippines finished in 6th place after being affected by the COVID-19 pandemic, forcing them to withdraw partway through the tournament and forfeit their last two games.

== Participating teams ==
=== Group A ===
Team	2019 result
Malaysia	Won gold medal in 2019.
Philippines	Won bronze medal in 2019.
United Arab Emirates	Finished 4th place in 2019.
Thailand	Host, winners of Division I in 2019.

=== Group B ===
Team	2019 Results
Indonesia	Finished 3rd in Division I in 2019.
India	Did not participate in 2019. Last participation in 2018.
Hong Kong	No previous participation.
Singapore	No previous participation.

== Match officials ==
5 referees and 8 linesmen were selected for the tournament.

Referees

- (United Arab Emirates) Yahya Al-Jneibi
- (Singapore) Yu Jin Ang
- (South Korea) Park Jae-Hyung
- (Thailand) Aomsim Ukbolluck
- (Malaysia) Mohamad Faris Hakimin Yusoff

Linesmen

- (United Arab Emirates) Ahmed Al-Farsi
- (Thailand) Ekkaphol Attaprachar
- (Thailand) Arnupap Charoenrak
- (Malaysia) Yong Elbert Cheah
- (Malaysia) Jien Yang Chua
- (Singapore) Qiwei Huang
- (Malaysia) Edmond Ng
- (Thailand) Jakkrit Songleksing

== Tournament format ==
The teams were assigned to two tiered groups. Top four seeded teams played in Group A, the other teams in Group B. The best two teams from Group A advanced directly to the semifinals; the third and fourth team from Group A along with the best two teams from Group B advanced to the quarterfinals.

== Preliminary round ==
All times are in Thailand Standard Time, (UTC+7).

=== Group A ===
Pos	Team	Pld	W	OTW	OTL	L	GF	GA	GD	Pts	Qualification
1	Thailand (H)	3	3	0	0	0	55	6	+49	9	Semifinals
2	United Arab Emirates	3	1	1	0	1	16	42	−26	5	Semifinals
3	Malaysia	3	1	0	0	2	21	27	−6	3	Quarterfinals
4	Philippines	3	0	0	1	2	14	31	−17	1	Quarterfinals

Source: IIHF.com
Rules for classification: Rules for classification: 1) points; 2) head-to-head points; 3) head-to-head goal difference; 4) head-to-head number of goals scored; 5) result against closest best-ranked team outside tied teams; 6) result against second-best ranked team outside tied teams; 7) seeding before tournament.
(H) Host

25 June 2022; 17:00	Thailand	14–4 (4–0, 2–2, 8–2)	Malaysia	Thailand International Ice Hockey Arena, Bangkok; Attendance: 358

Game reference
			Referee: (United Arab Emirates) Yahya Al-Jneibi; Linesmen: (United Arab Emirates) Ahmed Al-Farsi (Singapore) Qiwei Huang
41 min	Penalties	14 min	Referee: (United Arab Emirates) Yahya Al-Jneibi; Linesmen: (United Arab Emirates) Ahmed Al-Farsi (Singapore) Qiwei Huang
62	Shots	21	Referee: (United Arab Emirates) Yahya Al-Jneibi; Linesmen: (United Arab Emirates) Ahmed Al-Farsi (Singapore) Qiwei Huang

25 June 2022; 20:30	Philippines	7–8 OT (2–2, 1–3, 4–2) (OT: 0–1)	United Arab Emirates	Thailand International Ice Hockey Arena, Bangkok; Attendance: 135

Game reference
			Referee: (Singapore) Yu Jin Ang; Linesmen: (Thailand) Ekkaphol Attaprachar (Malaysia) Edmond Ng
14 min	Penalties	16 min	Referee: (Singapore) Yu Jin Ang; Linesmen: (Thailand) Ekkaphol Attaprachar (Malaysia) Edmond Ng
42	Shots	39	Referee: (Singapore) Yu Jin Ang; Linesmen: (Thailand) Ekkaphol Attaprachar (Malaysia) Edmond Ng

26 June 2022; 17:00	Philippines	2–13 (1–7, 0–5, 1–1)	Thailand	Thailand International Ice Hockey Arena, Bangkok; Attendance: 358

Game reference
			Referee: (Singapore) Yu Jin Ang; Linesmen: (Malaysia) Yong Elbert Cheah (Malaysia) Edmond Ng
8 min	Penalties	39 min	Referee: (Singapore) Yu Jin Ang; Linesmen: (Malaysia) Yong Elbert Cheah (Malaysia) Edmond Ng
15	Shots	64	Referee: (Singapore) Yu Jin Ang; Linesmen: (Malaysia) Yong Elbert Cheah (Malaysia) Edmond Ng

26 June 2022; 20:30	Malaysia	7–8 (2–1, 3–4, 2–3)	United Arab Emirates	Thailand International Ice Hockey Arena, Bangkok; Attendance: 146

Game reference
			Referee: (South Korea) Park Jae-Hyung; Linesmen: (Singapore) Qiwei Huang (Thailand) Jakkrit Songleksing
28 min	Penalties	14 min	Referee: (South Korea) Park Jae-Hyung; Linesmen: (Singapore) Qiwei Huang (Thailand) Jakkrit Songleksing
29	Shots	35	Referee: (South Korea) Park Jae-Hyung; Linesmen: (Singapore) Qiwei Huang (Thailand) Jakkrit Songleksing

28 June 2022; 17:00	Malaysia	10–5 (2–1, 4–2, 4–2)	Philippines	Thailand International Ice Hockey Arena, Bangkok; Attendance: 152

Game reference
			Referee: (United Arab Emirates) Yahya Al-Jneibi; Linesmen: (Thailand) Ekkaphol Attaprachar (Thailand) Jakkrit Songleksing
12 min	Penalties	10 min	Referee: (United Arab Emirates) Yahya Al-Jneibi; Linesmen: (Thailand) Ekkaphol Attaprachar (Thailand) Jakkrit Songleksing
55	Shots	32	Referee: (United Arab Emirates) Yahya Al-Jneibi; Linesmen: (Thailand) Ekkaphol Attaprachar (Thailand) Jakkrit Songleksing

28 June 2022; 20:30	United Arab Emirates	0–28 (0–11, 0–10, 0–7)	Thailand	Thailand International Ice Hockey Arena, Bangkok; Attendance: 395

Game reference
			Referee: (South Korea) Park Jae-Hyung; Linesmen: (Malaysia) Yong Elbert Cheah (Singapore) Qiwei Huang
16 min	Penalties	12 min	Referee: (South Korea) Park Jae-Hyung; Linesmen: (Malaysia) Yong Elbert Cheah (Singapore) Qiwei Huang
16	Shots	71	Referee: (South Korea) Park Jae-Hyung; Linesmen: (Malaysia) Yong Elbert Cheah (Singapore) Qiwei Huang

=== Group B ===
Pos	Team	Pld	W	OTW	OTL	L	GF	GA	GD	Pts	Qualification
1	Hong Kong	3	3	0	0	0	26	8	+18	9	Quarterfinals
2	Singapore	3	2	0	0	1	19	9	+10	6	Quarterfinals
3	Indonesia	3	1	0	0	2	9	13	−4	3	7th place game
4	India	3	0	0	0	3	6	30	−24	0	7th place game

Source: IIHF.com
Rules for classification: Rules for classification: 1) points; 2) head-to-head points; 3) head-to-head goal difference; 4) head-to-head number of goals scored; 5) result against closest best-ranked team outside tied teams; 6) result against second-best ranked team outside tied teams; 7) seeding before tournament.

25 June 2022; 10:00	Singapore	5–1 (2–1, 1–0, 2–0)	Indonesia	Thailand International Ice Hockey Arena, Bangkok; Attendance: 130

Game reference
			Referee: (Thailand) Aomsim Ukbolluck; Linesmen: (Malaysia) Jien Yang Chua (Thailand) Jakkrit Songleksing
25 min	Penalties	15 min	Referee: (Thailand) Aomsim Ukbolluck; Linesmen: (Malaysia) Jien Yang Chua (Thailand) Jakkrit Songleksing
8	Shots	14	Referee: (Thailand) Aomsim Ukbolluck; Linesmen: (Malaysia) Jien Yang Chua (Thailand) Jakkrit Songleksing

25 June 2022; 13:30	India	2–14 (0–4, 1–5, 1–5)	Hong Kong	Thailand International Ice Hockey Arena, Bangkok; Attendance: 121

Game reference
			Referee: (Malaysia) Mohamed Faris Hakimin Yusoff; Linesmen: (Thailand) Arnupap Charoenrak (Malaysia) Yong Elbert Cheah
8 min	Penalties	65 min	Referee: (Malaysia) Mohamed Faris Hakimin Yusoff; Linesmen: (Thailand) Arnupap Charoenrak (Malaysia) Yong Elbert Cheah
16	Shots	2	Referee: (Malaysia) Mohamed Faris Hakimin Yusoff; Linesmen: (Thailand) Arnupap Charoenrak (Malaysia) Yong Elbert Cheah

26 June 2022; 10:00	India	1–10 (0–2, 0–5, 1–3)	Singapore	Thailand International Ice Hockey Arena, Bangkok; Attendance: 121

Game reference
			Referee: (Malaysia) Mohamed Faris Hakimin Yusoff; Linesmen: (United Arab Emirates) Ahmed Al-Farsi (Thailand) Arnupap Charoenrak
14 min	Penalties	8 min	Referee: (Malaysia) Mohamed Faris Hakimin Yusoff; Linesmen: (United Arab Emirates) Ahmed Al-Farsi (Thailand) Arnupap Charoenrak
16	Shots	58	Referee: (Malaysia) Mohamed Faris Hakimin Yusoff; Linesmen: (United Arab Emirates) Ahmed Al-Farsi (Thailand) Arnupap Charoenrak

26 June 2022; 13:30	Indonesia	2–5 (0–1, 1–1, 1–3)	Hong Kong	Thailand International Ice Hockey Arena, Bangkok; Attendance: 145

Game reference
			Referee: (Thailand) Aomsim Ukbolluck; Linesmen: (Thailand) Ekkaphol Attaprachar (Malaysia) Jien Yang Chua
16 min	Penalties	12 min	Referee: (Thailand) Aomsim Ukbolluck; Linesmen: (Thailand) Ekkaphol Attaprachar (Malaysia) Jien Yang Chua
27	Shots	39	Referee: (Thailand) Aomsim Ukbolluck; Linesmen: (Thailand) Ekkaphol Attaprachar (Malaysia) Jien Yang Chua

28 June 2022; 10:00	Indonesia	6–3 (1–1, 4–1, 1–1)	India	Thailand International Ice Hockey Arena, Bangkok; Attendance: 124

Game reference
			Referee: (Thailand) Aomsim Ukbolluck; Linesmen: (Thailand) Arnupap Charoenrak (Malaysia) Jien Yang Chua
4 min	Penalties	14 min	Referee: (Thailand) Aomsim Ukbolluck; Linesmen: (Thailand) Arnupap Charoenrak (Malaysia) Jien Yang Chua
46	Shots	13	Referee: (Thailand) Aomsim Ukbolluck; Linesmen: (Thailand) Arnupap Charoenrak (Malaysia) Jien Yang Chua

28 June 2022; 13:30	Hong Kong	7–4 (3–1, 1–1, 3–2)	Singapore	Thailand International Ice Hockey Arena, Bangkok; Attendance: 175

Game reference
			Referee: (Malaysia) Mohamed Faris Hakimin Yusoff; Linesmen: (United Arab Emirates) Ahmed Al-Farsi (Malaysia) Edmond Ng
67 min	Penalties	26 min	Referee: (Malaysia) Mohamed Faris Hakimin Yusoff; Linesmen: (United Arab Emirates) Ahmed Al-Farsi (Malaysia) Edmond Ng
19	Shots	11	Referee: (Malaysia) Mohamed Faris Hakimin Yusoff; Linesmen: (United Arab Emirates) Ahmed Al-Farsi (Malaysia) Edmond Ng

== Playoff round ==
Quarterfinals
A4	~~Philippines~~	0
B1	Hong Kong (forfeit)	5
A3	Malaysia	1
B2	Singapore (OT)	2

Semifinals
A1	Thailand (OT)	7
B1	Hong Kong	6
A2	United Arab Emirates	3
B2	Singapore	4

Final
A1	Thailand	4
B2	Singapore	3
3rd place game
B1	Hong Kong	6
A2	United Arab Emirates	5

5th place game
A3	Malaysia (forfeit)	5
A4	~~Philippines~~	0
7th place game
B3	Indonesia	8
B4	India	2

=== Quarterfinals ===
29 June 2022; 17:00	Malaysia	1–2 OT (0–0, 0–1, 1–0) (OT: 0–1)	Singapore	Thailand International Ice Hockey Arena, Bangkok; Attendance: 169

Game reference
			Referee: (Thailand) Aomsim Ukbolluck; Linesmen: (United Arab Emirates) Ahmed Al-Farsi (Thailand) Arnupap Charoenrak
8 min	Penalties	22 min	Referee: (Thailand) Aomsim Ukbolluck; Linesmen: (United Arab Emirates) Ahmed Al-Farsi (Thailand) Arnupap Charoenrak
22	Shots	26	Referee: (Thailand) Aomsim Ukbolluck; Linesmen: (United Arab Emirates) Ahmed Al-Farsi (Thailand) Arnupap Charoenrak

29 June 2022; 20:30	Philippines	0–5 (forfeit)	Hong Kong	Thailand International Ice Hockey Arena, Bangkok

=== 5th place game ===
1 July 2022; 10:00	Malaysia	5–0 (forfeit)	Philippines	Thailand International Ice Hockey Arena, Bangkok

=== 7th place game ===
1 July 2022; 13:30	Indonesia	8–2 (3–0, 2–2, 3–0)	India	Thailand International Ice Hockey Arena, Bangkok; Attendance: 118

Game reference
			Referee: (Malaysia) Mohamed Faris Hakimin Yusoff; Linesmen: (Thailand) Ekkaphol Attaprachar (Malaysia) Jien Yang Chua
14 min	Penalties	14 min	Referee: (Malaysia) Mohamed Faris Hakimin Yusoff; Linesmen: (Thailand) Ekkaphol Attaprachar (Malaysia) Jien Yang Chua
53	Shots	20	Referee: (Malaysia) Mohamed Faris Hakimin Yusoff; Linesmen: (Thailand) Ekkaphol Attaprachar (Malaysia) Jien Yang Chua

=== Semifinals ===
1 July 2022; 17:00	Thailand	7–6 OT (0–1, 1–3, 5–2) (OT: 1–0)	Hong Kong	Thailand International Ice Hockey Arena, Bangkok; Attendance: 402

Game reference
			Referee: (Singapore) Yu Jin Ang; Linesmen: (Malaysia) Yong Elbert Cheah (Singapore) Qiwei Huang
12 min	Penalties	26 min	Referee: (Singapore) Yu Jin Ang; Linesmen: (Malaysia) Yong Elbert Cheah (Singapore) Qiwei Huang
51	Shots	21	Referee: (Singapore) Yu Jin Ang; Linesmen: (Malaysia) Yong Elbert Cheah (Singapore) Qiwei Huang

1 July 2022; 20:30	United Arab Emirates	3–4 (1–0, 2–1, 0–3)	Singapore	Thailand International Ice Hockey Arena, Bangkok; Attendance: 198

Game reference
			Referee: (South Korea) Park Jae-Hyung; Linesmen: (Malaysia) Edmond Ng (Thailand) Jakkrit Songleksing
18 min	Penalties	2 min	Referee: (South Korea) Park Jae-Hyung; Linesmen: (Malaysia) Edmond Ng (Thailand) Jakkrit Songleksing
24	Shots	51	Referee: (South Korea) Park Jae-Hyung; Linesmen: (Malaysia) Edmond Ng (Thailand) Jakkrit Songleksing

=== 3rd place game ===
2 July 2022; 13:30	Hong Kong	6–5 (1–2, 3–2, 2–1)	United Arab Emirates	Thailand International Ice Hockey Arena, Bangkok; Attendance: 163

Game reference
			Referee: (Singapore) Yu Jin Ang; Linesmen: (Malaysia) Jien Yang Chua (Singapore) Qiwei Huang
14 min	Penalties	10 min	Referee: (Singapore) Yu Jin Ang; Linesmen: (Malaysia) Jien Yang Chua (Singapore) Qiwei Huang
51	Shots	26	Referee: (Singapore) Yu Jin Ang; Linesmen: (Malaysia) Jien Yang Chua (Singapore) Qiwei Huang

=== Final ===
2 July 2022; 17:00	Thailand	4–3 (2–2, 1–1, 1–0)	Singapore	Thailand International Ice Hockey Arena, Bangkok; Attendance: 535

Game reference
			Referee: (South Korea) Park Jae-Hyung; Linesmen: (Malaysia) Yong Elbert Cheah (Malaysia) Edmond Ng
41 min	Penalties	14 min	Referee: (South Korea) Park Jae-Hyung; Linesmen: (Malaysia) Yong Elbert Cheah (Malaysia) Edmond Ng
47	Shots	23	Referee: (South Korea) Park Jae-Hyung; Linesmen: (Malaysia) Yong Elbert Cheah (Malaysia) Edmond Ng

== Final ranking ==
Pos	Grp	Team	Pld	W	OTW	OTL	L	GF	GA	GD	Pts	Result
1	A	Thailand (H)	5	4	1	0	0	66	15	+51	14	Champions
2	B	Singapore	6	3	1	0	2	28	17	+11	11	Runners-up
3	B	Hong Kong	6	5	0	1	0	43	20	+23	16	Third place
4	A	United Arab Emirates	5	1	1	0	3	24	52	−28	5	Fourth place
5	A	Malaysia	5	2	0	1	2	27	29	−2	7	Lost in Quarterfinals
6	A	Philippines	5	0	0	1	4	14	41	−27	1	Lost in Quarterfinals
7	B	Indonesia	4	2	0	0	2	17	15	+2	6	7th place game
8	B	India	4	0	0	0	4	8	38	−30	0	7th place game

Source: IIHF.com
(H) Host
