= 2019 IIHF U20 Challenge Cup of Asia =

Tournament details
- Host country: Malaysia
- City: Kuala Lumpur
- Venue(s): 1 (in 1 host city)
- Dates: 5–8 December 2018
- Teams: 4

Final positions
- Champions: Malaysia (2nd title)
- Runner-up: Kyrgyzstan
- Third place: Philippines

Tournament statistics
- Games played: 6
- Goals scored: 80 (13.33 per game)
- Attendance: 1,721 (287 per game)
- Scoring leader(s): (Malaysia) Mohammad Hariz Mohammad Oryza Ananda (14 points)

Awards
- MVP: (Malaysia) Chee Ming Bryan Lim

The 2019 IIHF U20 Challenge Cup of Asia was an international men's under-20 ice hockey tournament run by the International Ice Hockey Federation (IIHF). The tournament took place between 5 December and 8 December 2018 in Kuala Lumpur, Malaysia and was the fifth edition held since its formation in 2012 under the IIHF Challenge Cup of Asia series of tournaments. Malaysia won the tournament after finishing first in the standings. Kyrgyzstan finished in second place and the Philippines finished third.

== Overview ==
The 2019 IIHF U20 Challenge Cup of Asia began on 5 December 2018 in Kuala Lumpur, Malaysia with games played at the Malaysia National Ice Skating Stadium (MyNISS). The defending champions Malaysia, Kyrgyzstan, the Philippines and the United Arab Emirates returned after finishing in the top four of the 2018 tournament. India, who finished fifth in 2018, did not return. The tournament ran alongside the 2019 IIHF U20 Challenge Cup of Asia Division I competition with all games being held in Kuala Lumpur.

The tournament consisted of a single round-robin with each team competing in three games. Malaysia won the tournament after winning all three of their games to finish at the top of the standings. The win was Malaysia's second gold medal of the competition having won their first in 2018. Kyrgyzstan finished second after losing only to Malaysia and the Philippines finished in third. Malaysia's Mohammad Hariz Mohammad Oryza Ananda led the tournament in scoring with 14 points and Temir Muktarbek of Kyrgyzstan finished as the leading goaltender with a save percentage of 90.70. Malaysia's Chee Ming Bryan Lim was named the most valuable player and Mohamed Alkaabi of the United Arab Emirates was named best forward by the IIHF Directorate. Kyrgyzstan's Ernazar Isamatov was named best defenceman and Jaiden Mackale Roxas of the Philippines was named best goaltender.

== Standings ==
The final standings of the tournament.

Team	Pld	W	OTW	OTL	L	GF	GA	GD	Pts
Malaysia	3	3	0	0	0	30	7	+23	9
Kyrgyzstan	3	2	0	0	1	27	9	+18	6
Philippines	3	1	0	0	2	11	31	−20	3
United Arab Emirates	3	0	0	0	3	12	33	−21	0

Source: IIHF

== Fixtures ==
All times are local. (MST – UTC+8)

5 December 2018; 17:00	Kyrgyzstan	13–2 (3–1, 4–0, 6–1)	Philippines	MyNISS; Attendance: 186

Game reference
10 min	Penalties	10 min
54	Shots	18

5 December 2018; 20:30	United Arab Emirates	3–14 (0–2, 1–5, 2–7)	Malaysia	MyNISS; Attendance: 366

Game reference
79 min	Penalties	10 min
16	Shots	69

7 December 2018; 17:00	Kyrgyzstan	12–3 (8–0, 4–0, 0–3)	United Arab Emirates	MyNISS; Attendance: 114

Game reference
16 min	Penalties	6 min
62	Shots	9

7 December 2018; 20:30	Malaysia	12–2 (7–1, 4–1, 1–0)	Philippines	MyNISS; Attendance: 395

Game reference
34 min	Penalties	20 min
45	Shots	23

8 December 2018; 17:00	Philippines	7–6 (2–1, 2–3, 3–2)	United Arab Emirates	MyNISS; Attendance: 142

Game reference
16 min	Penalties	8 min
43	Shots	37

8 December 2018; 20:30	Malaysia	4–2 (2–1, 0–0, 2–1)	Kyrgyzstan	MyNISS; Attendance: 518

Game reference
10 min	Penalties	43 min
26	Shots	35

== Scoring leaders ==
List shows the top ten skaters sorted by points, then goals, assists, a greater plus-minus, and then lower penalties in minutes.

Player (Team)	GP	G	A	Pts	+/–	PIM	POS
(Malaysia) Mohammad Hariz Mohammad Oryza Ananda (MAS)	3	8	6	14	+4	2	F
(Malaysia) Chee Ming Bryan Lim (MAS)	3	7	5	12	+6	0	F
(United Arab Emirates) Mohamed Alkaabi (UAE)	3	7	2	9	–4	14	F
(Kyrgyzstan) Ersultan Mirbek Uulu (KGZ)	3	5	3	8	+9	4	D
(Kyrgyzstan) Zhanbolot Tagaev (KGZ)	3	5	3	8	+6	20	F
(Kyrgyzstan) Sultan Ismanov (KGZ)	3	4	4	8	+10	0	F
(Malaysia) Ilhan Mahmood Haniff (MAS)	3	3	5	8	+3	0	F
(Malaysia) Nurul Nizam Deen Versluis (MAS)	3	4	3	7	+5	14	F
(Kyrgyzstan) Kirill Kim (KGZ)	3	2	4	6	+9	2	F
(Kyrgyzstan) Andrei Trishkin (KGZ)	3	2	3	5	+6	0	D
(Philippines) Benjamin Jorge Imperial (PHI)	3	2	3	5	–1	0	F

== Leading goaltenders ==
Only the top goaltenders, based on save percentage, who have played at least 40% of their team's minutes are included in this list.

Player (Team)	MIP	SOG	GA	GAA	SVS%	SO
(Kyrgyzstan) Temir Muktarbek (KGZ)	134:46	43	4	1.78	90.70	0
(Malaysia) Raja Adam Iskandar Raja Amin (MAS)	170:56	73	7	2.46	90.41	0
(Philippines) Jaiden Mackale Roxas (PHI)	139:07	90	17	7.33	81.11	0
(United Arab Emirates) Abdulrahman Alhosani (UAE)	180:00	174	33	11.00	81.03	0
