= India national ice hockey team =

India national ice hockey team may refer to:

- India men's national ice hockey team
- India men's national junior ice hockey team
- India men's national under-18 ice hockey team
- India women's national ice hockey team
