= Ice Hockey Association of India =

Ice hockey governing body in India

- Association name: Ice Hockey Association of India
- IIHF Code: IND
- IIHF membership: April 27, 1989
- President: Gurpreet Singh Bakshi (NCR-based); Kunzang Namgyal (Maharashtra-based)

The Ice Hockey Association of India (IHAI) is the governing body responsible for overseeing ice hockey in India. It became a member of the International Ice Hockey Federation (IIHF) on April 27, 1989.

== History ==
In addition to working with other sport organisations, such as the Indian Olympic Association and the Sports Authority of India, the IHAI is governing all national sections and tournaments, mainly the Indian Ice Hockey Championship. In April 2015, the players started a crowdfunding campaign on BitGiving to take part in an international tournament. The hashtag #SupportIceHockey trended nationwide. In response to the campaign, the team also received its first corporate sponsorship deal with the Mahindra Group. The group's head Anand Mahindra tweeted that he had "decided to support these passionate athletes".

Many of the members of the Indian national team, coordinated by the IHAI, are recruited from clubs associated with military units and regiments. The IHAI has created programs to introduce the sport to a wider audience, for example through the Learn to Play program that has been implemented in Ladakh, Kargil, Delhi, and Mumbai. As an alternative for players who do not have access to outdoor ice rinks, the association began holding programs in the in-line hockey, building on existing in-line hockey being played in Gujarat and Mumbai. In 2015, the Ice Hockey Association of India sent the men's national team to Canada to play a game against the ECHL's Brampton Beast. On the team's trip through Canada, the team led by Adam Sherlip also played the CWHL's Calgary Inferno.

In December 2025, IHAI launched their first national ice hockey league India Ice Hockey League. It aims to develop homegrown talent and help the national team to enter into the World Championships system. The league is set to be held from December to March annually. The competition features men's, women's and under-18 categories.

== National teams ==
=== Men's ===
- India men's national ice hockey team
- India men's national junior ice hockey team
- India men's national under-18 ice hockey team

=== Women's ===
- India women's national ice hockey team
