= Hockey in India =

Hockey in India may refer to:

- Field hockey in India
- Ice hockey in India
