= Ice hockey in India =

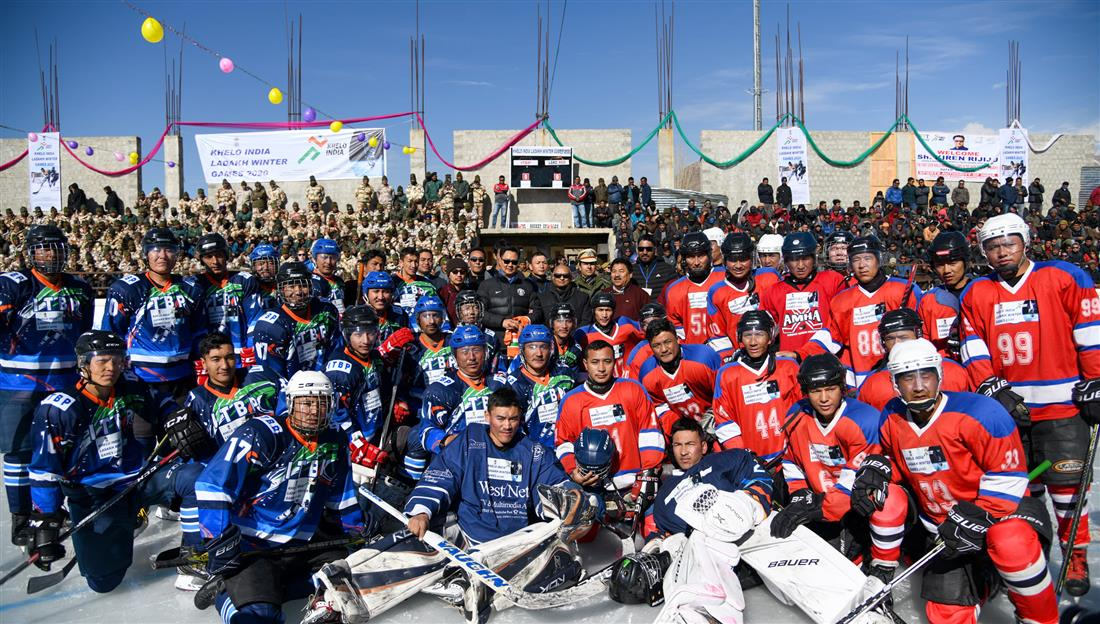
- Ice hockey players at the inauguration of the Khelo India Winter Games in 2020
- Country: India
- Governing body: Ice Hockey Association of India
- National teams: Men; Women
- First played: 1989

National competitions
- Indian Ice Hockey Championship

Ice hockey is a sport that is gaining popularity in India. It is played mostly in places like Ladakh, Uttarakhand, West Bengal, Sikkim, Arunachal Pradesh, Himachal Pradesh, and Jammu and Kashmir in the north of India, where cold weather occurs and the game can be played outdoors. Ice hockey enthusiasts from other places in the country, as well as expatriates, head to places like Ladakh for the experience of playing in some of the highest elevated rinks in the world. There are a few artificial indoor ice skating rinks in the rest of the country, such as the Doon Ice Rink in Dehradun, which can accommodate ice hockey with an international-sized rink.

Along with the Indian Ice Hockey Championship and the Khelo India Winter Games, India has also had the Royal Enfield Ice Hockey League, Spiti Cup in Himachal Pradesh, CEC Ice Hockey Cup, LG Cup and India Ice Hockey League, along with more tournaments in different parts of the north.

== History ==
Ice hockey was introduced to the public in Shimla during the 1930s under British colonial rule and gained popularity in the 1960s when Indian military units stationed in Ladakh (especially Col. K L Kaushal) promoted the game among the local population . The first National Championship was held in 1986, and three years later the Ice Hockey Association of India (IHAI) joined the International Ice Hockey Federation.

Through the 1990s Ladakh developed a strong club scene with regular winter tournaments. India’s men’s national team made its debut in 2009 at the IIHF Challenge Cup in Abu Dhabi, finishing eighth. The following year the Himadri Ice Rink opened in Dehradun as the country’s first international-size indoor facility, but it was closed in 2012 due to high operational costs. That same year India hosted its first IIHF event, the Challenge Cup of Asia in Dehradun.

The women’s national team debuted in 2016. In 2017 the men recorded their first significant result by finishing second at the Challenge Cup of Asia – Division I. A year later India hosted the highest-altitude ice hockey game ever. Financial problems forced the national team to withdraw from the Challenge Cup in 2019, beginning a five-year absence from the international stage.

In 2020 ice hockey became a regular part of the Khelo India Winter Games. In 2023 Royal Enfield, in partnership with Ladakh’s administration and IHAI, launched the “Blueprint for Ice Hockey Development in Ladakh,” a long-term project aimed at eventual Olympic participation in 2042. The initiative included the first Royal Enfield Ice Hockey League in January 2024, featuring men’s and women’s teams from Ladakh.

India returned to international competition at the 2025 Asian Winter Games in Harbin, placing 12th out of 14 after defeating Macau but losing to Turkmenistan, Hong Kong and Singapore. In May 2025 the Dehradun indoor rink reopened after 13 years. One month later the women’s national team achieved a historic milestone by winning bronze at the 2025 IIHF Women's Asia Cup.

== About ==
The India national ice hockey team has been competing at the international level since 2009 with head coach Adam Sherlip behind at the bench during the tournament in Abu Dhabi. Adam also coached in Ladakh through The Hockey Foundation.

== Clubs ==
The country's two oldest ice hockey clubs are Shimla Ice Skating Club, which has existed since 1920 but began playing ice hockey much later, and Ladakh Winter Sports Club, which was established in 1995. The other historical clubs affiliated to the IHAI have been:

- Ladakh Winter Sports Club
- Indo-Tibetan Border Police
- Ladakh Scouts
- Shimla Ice Skating Club
- High Altitude Warfare School
- Kargil Ice and Snow Sports Club

== In popular culture ==
In 2011, an Indo-Canadian film Breakaway based on an Indian ice hockey team was produced by actor Akshay Kumar, who is a fan of the sport. He also made a contribution to the Ice Hockey Association of India to encourage greater participation and awareness in the sport.

== See also ==
- India women's national ice hockey team
- Ice skating in India
