= Indian Ice Hockey Championship =

- Sport: Ice hockey
- No. of teams: Various
- Country: India

The Indian Ice Hockey Championship is the national military units and regiments ice hockey championship in India, organised by the Ice Hockey Association of India.

== Champions ==
- 2005: Army Red
- 2007: Rimo Club Leh
- 2008: Jammu and Kashmir Blue Team
- 2009: Ladakh Scouts
- 2010: Indo-Tibetan Border Police
- 2011: Indo-Tibetan Border Police
- 2014: Ladakh Scouts
- 2016: Indian Army (LSRC)
- 2019: Indo-Tibetan Border Police
- 2021: Indo-Tibetan Border Police
- 2022: Indo-Tibetan Border Police
- 2023: Indo-Tibetan Border Police

== See also ==
- India men's national ice hockey team
- India men's national junior ice hockey team
- India men's national under-18 ice hockey team
- India women's national ice hockey team
