= Kyrgyzstan men's national junior ice hockey team =

Хоккей боюнча Кыргызстандын өспүрүмдөр курама командасы Hokkei Boyuncha Keurgeuzstandeun Oespueruemdoer Kurama Komandaseu
- The 40 ray sun and a crown of a Kyrgyz yurt as seen on the Kyrgyzstan flag is the badge used on the players jerseys.
- Association: Ice Hockey Federation of the Kyrgyz Republic
- General manager: Elzar Bolotbekov
- Head coach: Daniil Shushenkov
- Captain: Islambek Abdeuraev
- Team colors
- IIHF code: KGZ

First international
- Kyrgyzstan 12 – 4 Philippines (Kuala Lumpur, Malaysia; 13 December 2017)

Biggest win
- Kyrgyzstan 15 – 1 Iran (Bishkek, Kyrgyzstan; 21 January 2026)

Biggest defeat
- Israel 16 – 1 Kyrgyzstan (Sofia, Bulgaria; 25 January 2024)

IIHF World Junior Championship
- Appearances: 5 (first in 2022)
- Best result: 40th (2023, 2024)

IIHF U20 Challenge Cup of Asia
- Appearances: 2 (first in 2018)
- Best result: 2nd (2018, 2019)

International record (W–L–T)
- 10–2–0

The Kyrgyzstan men's national junior ice hockey team is the men's national under-20 ice hockey team of Kyrgyzstan. The team is controlled by the Ice Hockey Federation of the Kyrgyz Republic, a member of the International Ice Hockey Federation. In December 2017 the team made their international debut at the 2018 IIHF U20 Challenge Cup of Asia where they finished second behind Malaysia.

== History ==
The Kyrgyzstan men's national junior ice hockey team debuted at the 2018 IIHF U20 Challenge Cup of Asia in Kuala Lumpur, Malaysia. Their opening game of the tournament was against the Philippines which they won 12–4. Kyrgyzstan went on to win their games against India and the United Arab Emirates and lost their match against Malaysia. Kyrgyzstan finished the round-robin tournament in second place behind Malaysia who won all of their games. The win against India of 13–2 is currently the team's largest victory on record. Defenceman Oleg Pismakov was selected as best Kyrgyz player of the tournament.

Kyrgyzstan hosted the Division III B group of the 2026 World Junior Ice Hockey Championships in Bishkek from 18 to 24 January 2026, playing against Mexico, Luxembourg, South Africa, Iran and Hong Kong. The team won the group and was promoted to Division III A.

== International competitions ==
- 2018 IIHF U20 Challenge Cup of Asia — 2nd overall
- 2019 IIHF U20 Challenge Cup of Asia — 2nd overall
- 2022 World Junior Championships — 41st overall (7th in Division III)
- 2023 World Junior Championships — 40th overall (6th in Division III)
- 2024 World Junior Championships — 40th overall (6th in Division III A)
- 2025 World Junior Championships — 42nd overall (2nd in Division III B)
- 2026 World Junior Championships — 41st overall (1st in Division III B)
