= United Arab Emirates men's national junior ice hockey team =

- The United Arab Emirates uses their national emblem as the badge on the team's jerseys
- Association: UAE Ice Sports Federation
- Team colors
- IIHF code: UAE

First international
- Bulgaria 16 – 0 United Arab Emirates (Sofia, Bulgaria; 14 January 2013)

Biggest win
- United Arab Emirates 6 – 0 India (Kuala Lumpur, Malaysia; 12 December 2017)

Biggest defeat
- Thailand 28–0 United Arab Emirates (Bangkok, Thailand; 28 June 2022)

IIHF U20 Challenge Cup of Asia
- Appearances: 3 (first in 2018)
- Best result: 3rd (2018)

International record (W–L–T)
- 4–8–0

The United Arab Emirates men's national junior ice hockey team is the men's national under-20 ice hockey team of the United Arab Emirates. The team is controlled by the UAE Ice Sports Federation, a member of the International Ice Hockey Federation (IIHF). Since debuting in 2013 the United Arab Emirates have competed in a series of exhibition games and competed in the 2018 IIHF U20 Challenge Cup of Asia where they finished third.

== History ==
The United Arab Emirates men's national junior ice hockey team played its first game in 2013 during the 2013 IIHF World U20 Championship Division III tournament in Sofia, Bulgaria. Prior to the start of the tournament the United Arab Emirates were disqualified and all of their games were declared forfeit for failing to register the minimum of 15 skaters and two goaltenders. The team was allowed to play exhibition games during the tournament, however the results of the games did not count towards the standings with the scores being officially record as 5–0 wins to all the opposing teams. The United Arab Emirates lost all five of their exhibition games against the other teams in the tournament. The largest loss was against China who won the game 23–1.

The United Arab Emirates returned to international competition in December 2017 at the 2018 IIHF U20 Challenge Cup of Asia in Kuala Lumpur, Malaysia. At the tournament the United Arab Emirates took on hosts Malaysia, India, Kyrgyzstan and the Philippines in a single round robin schedule. They finished in third place on the standings after winning two of their four games. Goaltender Abdulrahman Al Hosani was named the best goalkeeper of the tournament by the IIHF Directorate and forward Mohamed Al Mehairbi was selected as best Emirati player of the tournament.

== International competitions ==
- 2013 IIHF World U20 Championship; Sofia, Bulgaria. Finish: 6th in Division III (not ranked, officially disqualified)
- 2018 IIHF U20 Challenge Cup of Asia; Kuala Lumpur, Malaysia. Finish: (bronze) rd
- 2019 IIHF U20 Challenge Cup of Asia; Kuala Lumpur, Malaysia. Finish: 4th
- 2022 IIHF U20 Asia and Oceania Championship; Bangkok, Thailand. Finish: 4th
