= Adam Sherlip =

American ice hockey coach

Personal information
- National team: India
- Born: Adam Craig Sherlip; March 21, 1984 (age 42)
- Occupation: Ice hockey coach

Adam Craig Sherlip (born March 21, 1984) is an American ice hockey coach. He was the first head coach of the India men's national ice hockey team, which competed in the IIHF Challenge Cup of Asia, hosted by Abu Dhabi, UAE, in 2009 and in Dehradun in 2012. It was in the 2012 tournament that India won its first international ice hockey game. He started coaching ice hockey in India as part of an initiative called "The Hockey Volunteer". As a result of "The Hockey Volunteer" initiative, Sherlip founded The Hockey Foundation, a non-profit organization that uses ice hockey to help improve life in the communities. The Hockey Foundation's pilot program operates in Ladakh. The Hockey Foundation has donated over 4,000 pieces of equipment since 2009. Sherlip and The Hockey Foundation were the subject of the documentary "Disputed Ice". He previously worked for the New York Islanders, and coached hockey at the City Ice Pavilion in Long Island City.
