= Philippines men's national junior ice hockey team =

Philippines
- Association: Federation of Ice Hockey League
- Head coach: (Philippines) Steven Füglister
- Assistants: (Philippines) Paul Sanchez
- Most points: Benjamin Imperial (10)
- Team colors
- IIHF code: PHI

First international
- Malaysia 11–0 Philippines (Kuala Lumpur, Malaysia; 12 December 2017)

Biggest win
- Philippines 11–5 India (Kuala Lumpur, Malaysia; 16 December 2017)

Biggest defeat
- Malaysia 11–0 Philippines (Kuala Lumpur, Malaysia; 12 December 2017); Kyrgyzstan 13–2 Philippines (Kuala Lumpur, Malaysia; 5 December 2018)

IIHF World U20 Championship
- Appearances: None

IIHF U20 Challenge Cup of Asia
- Appearances: 2 (first in 2018)
- Best result: 3rd (2019)

International record (W–L–T)
- 2–5–0

The Philippine men's national under-20 ice hockey team is the national under-20 ice hockey team of the Philippines. The team is controlled by the Federation of Ice Hockey League (FIHL), an associate member of the International Ice Hockey Federation (IIHF). The team have not entered in any IIHF World U20 Championship.

== History ==
The first IIHF-sanctioned event the Philippine junior team participated in was the 2018 IIHF U20 Challenge Cup of Asia which was held in Kuala Lumpur, Malaysia in December 2017. The hosts Malaysia won the gold while the Philippines finished fourth in the tournament contested by five national teams winning only over last-placers India. Filipino player, Benjamin Jorge Imperial was named Best Defenceman at the end of the tournament who is also the best non-Malaysian scorer with six goals and four assisting. The team's head coach was Steven Füglister. In the second edition, also hosted by Malaysia, the Philippines placed third place besting only the United Arab Emirates in the four-team competition. Jaiden Mackale Roxas was selected as the tournament's Best Goaltender.

== International competitions ==
=== U20 Challenge Cup of Asia ===
Year	Host	Result	Pld	W	OW	OL	L
2018	(Malaysia) Kuala Lumpur	4th place	4	1	0	0	3
2019	(Malaysia) Kuala Lumpur	3rd place	4	1	0	0	2

== All-time record against other nations ==
Last match update: 8 December 2018

Team	GP	W	T	L	GF	GA
India	1	1	0	0	11	5
Kyrgyzstan	2	0	0	2	6	25
Malaysia	2	0	0	2	2	23
United Arab Emirates	2	1	0	1	11	14
Total	7	2	0	5	30	67

== See also ==
- Philippines men's national ice hockey team
- Philippines women's national ice hockey team
