= Malaysia men's national junior ice hockey team =

- Association: Malaysia Ice Hockey Federation
- General manager: Noor Hisham Yahaya
- Head coach: Andy Yew Ming Chang
- Assistants: Wai Kin Brandon Tan
- Captain: Chee Ming Bryan Lim
- Team colors
- IIHF code: MAS

First international
- Philippines 0 – 11 Malaysia (Kuala Lumpur, Malaysia; 12 December 2017)

Biggest win
- Philippines 0 – 11 Malaysia (Kuala Lumpur, Malaysia; 12 December 2017); United Arab Emirates 3 – 14 Malaysia (Kuala Lumpur, Malaysia; 5 December 2018)

IIHF U20 Challenge Cup of Asia
- Appearances: 2 (first in 2018)
- Best result: 1st (2018, 2019)

International record (W–L–T)
- 7–0–0

The Malaysia men's national junior ice hockey team is the men's national under-20 ice hockey team of Malaysia. The team is controlled by the Malaysia Ice Hockey Federation, a member of the International Ice Hockey Federation. The team made its international debut in December 2017 and currently competes in the IIHF U20 Challenge Cup of Asia which it has won on two occasions.

== History ==
The Malaysia men's national junior ice hockey team debuted at the 2018 IIHF U20 Challenge Cup of Asia in Kuala Lumpur, Malaysia. Their opening game of the tournament was against the Philippines which they won 11–0, currently the team's largest victory on record. Malaysia went on to win their other three games of the tournament against India, Kyrgyzstan and the United Arab Emirates, finishing first in the standings and winning the tournament. Forward Mohammad Hariz Mohammad Oryza Ananda was named the most valuable player after leading the scoring with 18 points. He was also selected as best Malaysian player of the tournament. Chee Ming Bryan Lim was named the tournament's best forward by the IIHF Directorate and Shahrul Ilyas Abdul Shukor finished as the leading goaltender with a save percentage of 97.56.

The following year Malaysia again hosted the IIHF U20 Challenge Cup of Asia in Kuala Lumpur. In their opening game Malaysia defeated the United Arab Emirates 14–3, equalling their largest recorded victory. Malaysia went on to win the tournament after defeating Kyrgyzstan and the Philippines and finishing first in the standings. Forwards Chee Ming Bryan Lim was named the most valuable player and Mohammad Hariz Mohammad Oryza Ananda was selected as the best Malaysian player of the tournament.

== International competitions ==
- 2018 IIHF U20 Challenge Cup of Asia. Finish: 1st
- 2019 IIHF U20 Challenge Cup of Asia. Finish: 1st

== Players and personnel ==
=== Current roster ===
For the 2019 IIHF U20 Challenge Cup of Asia

#	Name	Pos	S/G	Age	Club
67	Adris Ikmal Abd Razak	F	R	January 20, 1999	Jazura Girls Ice Hockey Club
15	Aqfar Naeem Abulais	F	R	April 9, 2001	Helang
37	Andika Rees Pahamin Azhar	F	R	March 13, 2002	Ice Wizards
19	Ilhan Mahmood Haniff	F	R	September 19, 2002	Jazura Girls Ice Hockey Club
65	Haidan Safiy Hazurin	D	R	May 6, 2004	Rimau Ice Hockey Club
9	Chee Ming Bryan Lim (C)	F	R	May 18, 1999	TNT
87	Hao Run Lim	F	R	October 4, 2002	Harimau Enra
51	Muhammad Asyraaf M.Haikal	G	L	June 9, 2003	Samurai
68	Mohammad Hariz Mohammad Oryza Ananda (A)	F	R	January 23, 2000	Jazura Girls Ice Hockey Club
7	Rafel Zichry Onn Mohammed Rhiza	D	R	May 7, 2001	Harimau Enra
77	Muhammad Fareez Afdlin Mohd Fauzi	F	R	December 3, 2003	Jazura Girls Ice Hockey Club
22	Jia Le Ng	D	R	May 6, 2004	Harimau Enra
44	Mohammad Aqeel Noor Hisham (A)	D	R	December 7, 2000	Samurai
34	Nur Adib Zafry Nur Aziz	D	R	October 11, 2002	Harimau Enra
30	Raja Adam Iskandar Raja Amin	G	L	November 3, 2000	Samurai
97	Raja Karim Adli Raja Amin	D	R	February 4, 2002	Harimau Enra
21	Vinodraj Sundram	D	R	February 21, 2002	Harimau Enra
18	Kaveesh Tamil Selvan	F	R	March 18, 2004	Harimau Enra
92	Nurul Nizam Deen Versluis	F	R	March 10, 1999	Jazura Girls Ice Hockey Club

=== Current team staff ===
For the 2019 IIHF U20 Challenge Cup of Asia

- Head coach: Andy Yew Ming Chang
- Assistant coach: Wai Kin Brandon Tan
- General Manager: Noor Hisham Yahaya
