= India men's national junior ice hockey team =

India
- Association: Ice Hockey Association of India
- Head coach: Mushtaque Giri
- Captain: Tsewang Dorjay
- Team colors
- IIHF code: IND

First international
- United Arab Emirates 6–0 India (Kuala Lumpur, Malaysia; 12 December 2017)

Biggest defeat
- Hong Kong 14–2 India (Bangkok, Thailand; 25 June 2022)

IIHF U20 Challenge Cup of Asia
- Appearances: 2 (first in 2018)
- Best result: 5th (2018)

International record (W–L–T)
- 0–8–0

The India men's national junior ice hockey team is the men's national under-20 ice hockey team of India. The team is controlled by the Ice Hockey Association of India, and a member of the International Ice Hockey Federation (IIHF). In December 2017 the team made their international debut at the 2018 IIHF U20 Challenge Cup of Asia where they finished in last place after losing all of their games.

== History ==
The India men's national junior ice hockey team debuted at the 2018 IIHF U20 Challenge Cup of Asia in Kuala Lumpur, Malaysia. Their opening game of the tournament was against the United Arab Emirates which they lost 0–6. India went on to lose their other three games of the tournament against Kyrgyzstan, Malaysia and the Philippines, finishing the tournament in last place. The loss to Kyrgyzstan of 2–13 was the teams worst on record until 2022, when they lost to Hong Kong. Forward Tsewang Dorjay was selected as best Indian player of the tournament.

== International competitions ==
- 2018 IIHF U20 Challenge Cup of Asia – 5th
- 2022 IIHF U20 Challenge Cup of Asia – 8th

== See also ==
- India men's national ice hockey team
- India men's national under-18 ice hockey team
- India women's national ice hockey team
