= 2018 IIHF U20 Challenge Cup of Asia =

Tournament details
- Host country: Malaysia
- Venue(s): 1 (in 1 host city)
- Dates: 12 – 17 December 2017
- Teams: 5

Final positions
- Champions: Malaysia (1st title)
- Runner-up: Kyrgyzstan
- Third place: United Arab Emirates

Tournament statistics
- Games played: 10
- Goals scored: 120 (12 per game)
- Attendance: 3,201 (320 per game)

Awards
- MVP: (Malaysia) Mohammad Hariz Mohammad Oryza Ananda

The 2018 IIHF U20 Challenge Cup of Asia was an international men's under-20 ice hockey tournament run by the International Ice Hockey Federation. The tournament took place between 12 and 17 December 2017 in Kuala Lumpur, Malaysia and was the fourth edition held since its formation in 2012 under the IIHF Challenge Cup of Asia series of tournaments. To be eligible as a "junior", a player cannot be born earlier than 1998. Malaysia won the tournament after winning all five of their round-robin games and finishing first in the standings. Kyrgyzstan finished in second place and the United Arab Emirates finished third.

== Overview ==
The 2018 IIHF U20 Challenge Cup of Asia began on 12 December 2017 in Kuala Lumpur, Malaysia with games played at the Malaysia National Ice Skating Stadium (MyNISS). The tournament is the first U20 Challenge Cup of Asia to be held since 2014. All four teams from the 2014 edition, Japan, Kazakhstan, MHL Red Stars and South Korea, did not return due to the International Ice Hockey Federation (IIHF) restructuring the tournament for countries which do not participate in the IIHF World U20 Championships. In August 2017 the IIHF announced the participants for the tournament. India, Kyrgyzstan, Malaysia and the Philippines all made their debut in under-20 international competition. The United Arab Emirates returned to international competition having last played a series of exhibition games in 2013 during the 2013 IIHF World U20 Championships.

The tournament consisted of a single round-robin with each team competing in four games. Malaysia won the tournament after winning all five of their games and finished first in the standings. Kyrgyzstan finished second after losing only to Malaysia and the United Arab Emirates finished in third. Malaysia's Mohammad Hariz Mohammad Oryza Ananda led the tournament in scoring with 18 points and was named the most valuable player. Shahrul Ilyas Abdul Shukor of Malaysia finished as the tournaments leading goaltender with a save percentage of 97.56. The IIHF Directorate however awarded best goalkeeper to Abdulrahman Al Hosani of the United Arab Emirates. Malaysia's Chee Ming Bryan Lim was named the best forward and Benjamin Jorge Imperial of the Philippines was named the best defenceman.

== Standings ==
The final standings of the tournament.

Team	Pld	W	OTW	OTL	L	GF	GA	GD	Pts
Malaysia	4	4	0	0	0	36	7	+29	12
Kyrgyzstan	4	3	0	0	1	36	14	+22	9
United Arab Emirates	4	2	0	0	2	18	21	−3	6
Philippines	4	1	0	0	3	19	36	−17	3
India	4	0	0	0	4	11	42	−31	0

Source: Tournament Progress (PDF). International Ice Hockey Federation. 2017-12-17

== Fixtures ==
All times are local. (MST – UTC+8)

12 December 2017; 15:30	India	0–6 (0–5, 0–1, 0–0)	United Arab Emirates	MyNISS; Attendance: 227

Game reference
6 min	Penalties	10 min
13	Shots	34

12 December 2017; 19:15	Philippines	0–11 (0–4, 0–3, 0–4)	Malaysia	MyNISS; Attendance: 563

Game reference
14 min	Penalties	10 min
15	Shots	49

13 December 2017; 19:00	Kyrgyzstan	12–4 (4–2, 5–1, 3–1)	Philippines	MyNISS; Attendance: 188

Game reference
28 min	Penalties	24 min
49	Shots	23

14 December 2017; 15:30	United Arab Emirates	2–10 (2–3, 0–4, 0–3)	Kyrgyzstan	MyNISS; Attendance: 122

Game reference
22 min	Penalties	28 min
20	Shots	42

14 December 2017; 19:00	Malaysia	12–4 (3–2, 5–2, 4–0)	India	MyNISS; Attendance: 329

Game reference
8 min	Penalties	20 min
66	Shots	14

15 December 2017; 19:00	Philippines	4–8 (0–5, 2–3, 2–0)	United Arab Emirates	MyNISS; Attendance: 133

Game reference
32 min	Penalties	16 min
26	Shots	34

16 December 2017; 15:30	India	5–11 (2–4, 3–6, 0–1)	Philippines	MyNISS; Attendance: 115

Game reference
8 min	Penalties	6 min
22	Shots	44

16 December 2017; 19:00	Malaysia	6–1 (4–1, 1–0, 1–0)	Kyrgyzstan	MyNISS; Attendance: 477

Game reference
16 min	Penalties	8 min
26	Shots	22

17 December 2017; 15:30	Kyrgyzstan	13–2 (3–0, 5–0, 5–2)	India	MyNISS; Attendance: 221

Game reference
8 min	Penalties	10 min
54	Shots	10

17 December 2017; 19:00	United Arab Emirates	2–7 (1–1, 0–3, 1–3)	Malaysia	MyNISS; Attendance: 826

Game reference
62 min	Penalties	12 min
17	Shots	46

== Scoring leaders ==
List shows the top ten skaters sorted by points, then goals, assists, and the lower penalties in minutes.

Player (Team)	GP	G	A	Pts	+/–	PIM	POS
(Malaysia) Mohammad Hariz Mohammad Oryza Ananda (MAS)	4	11	7	18	+18	2	F
(Malaysia) Nurul Nizam Deen Versluis (MAS)	4	7	10	17	+16	2	F
(Malaysia) Chee Ming Bryan Lim (MAS)	4	6	7	13	+13	0	F
(Philippines) Benjamin Jorge Imperial (PHI)	4	6	4	10	–1	0	D
(Kyrgyzstan) Andrei Trishkin (KGZ)	3	6	3	9	+10	0	D
(United Arab Emirates) Mohamed Al Mehairbi (UAE)	4	6	3	9	+1	4	F
(Kyrgyzstan) Ersultan Mirbek Uulu (KGZ)	4	6	3	9	+11	6	D
(Kyrgyzstan) Islambek Abdyraev (KGZ)	4	4	5	9	+5	6	F
(India) Tsewang Dorjay (IND)	4	6	2	8	–14	2	F
(Kyrgyzstan) Nikolai Magiev (KGZ)	4	4	4	8	+11	4	F

== Leading goaltenders ==
Only the top five goaltenders, based on save percentage, who have played at least 40% of their team's minutes are included in this list.

Player (Team)	MIP	SOG	GA	GAA	SVS%	SO
(Malaysia) Shahrul Ilyas Abdul Shukor (MAS)	139:53	41	1	0.43	97.56	1
(Kyrgyzstan) Kadyr Alymbekov (KGZ)	103:34	27	4	2.32	85.19	0
(United Arab Emirates) Abdulrahman Al Hosani (UAE)	227:09	122	19	5.02	84.43	1
(Kyrgyzstan) Temir Muktarbek (KGZ)	136:08	52	10	4.41	80.77	0
(Philippines) Jaiden Mackale Roxas (PHI)	130:55	80	16	7.33	80.00	0
