= Sport in the United Arab Emirates =

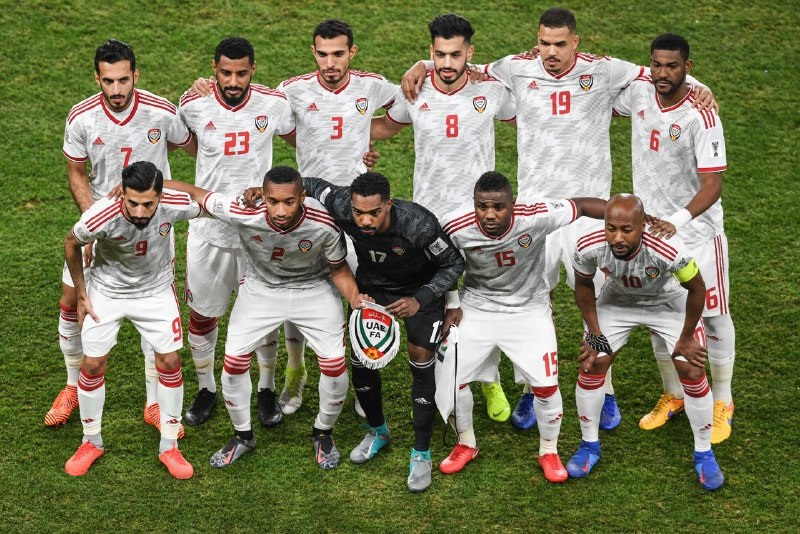
United Arab Emirates national football team at the 2019 Asian Cup

There are sporting events held in United Arab Emirates.

== Brazilian jiu-jitsu ==
While there is no single official "national sport" of the UAE, Brazilian Jiu-Jitsu is widely recognized as a national sport, particularly due to its state-funded promotion. The UAE Jiu-Jitsu Federation (UAEJJF) plays a significant role in promoting and developing the sport.

The ADCC Submission Fighting World Championship is held in UAE. It has been running since 1998 seeing many nationalities attend and win.

== Football ==
Football is one the most popular sports in the country.

== Motorsport ==
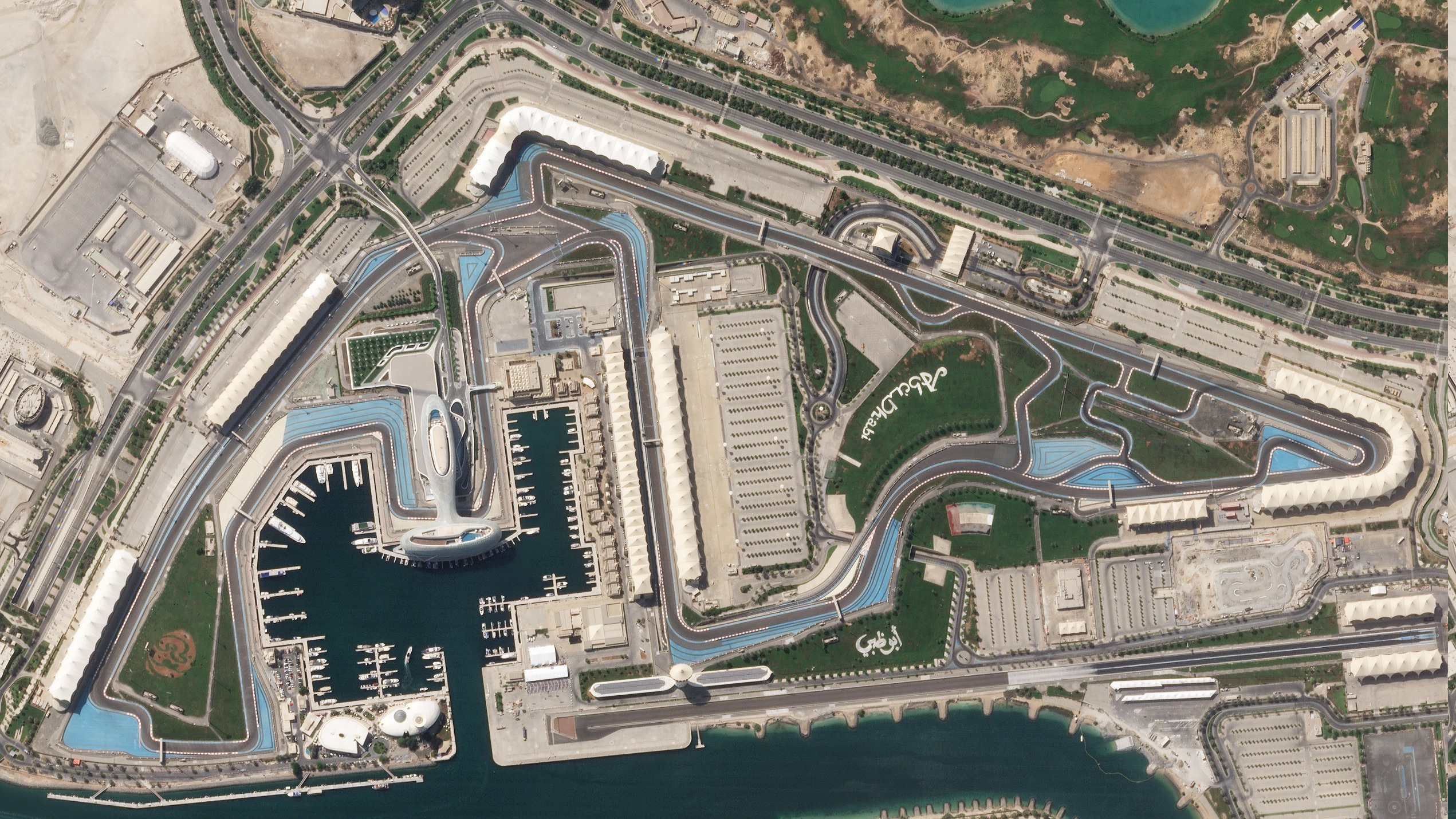
A satellite image of the Yas Marina Circuit.

A one-off motorsport race titled the 1981 Dubai Grand Prix was held at a purpose-built circuit in Deira Corniche. Since 2009, the Yas Marina Circuit on Yas Island, Abu Dhabi, has held the Formula One Abu Dhabi Grand Prix, with it being the final round of the season. The Formula 4 UAE Championship was an FIA sanctioned series that was held since 2016, however has since folded in 2024. Circuits that it was raced at included the Yas Marina Circuit, the Dubai Autodrome and finally two rounds outside the country in Kuwait. Formula Regional Middle East Championship continues to race at the Dubai and Yas Marina venues.

There are many endurance races held in the UAE. The 24 Hours of Dubai race is held at the Dubai Autodrome every year in January, marking the first auto race of the calendar year. Another endurances race held in the Dubai includes the ALMS 4 Hours of Dubai. Yas Marina Circuit also hosts many endurance races including the ALMS 4 Hours of Abu Dhabi, the GT endurance race Gulf 12 Hours and the 6 Hours of Abu Dhabi which forms part of the Middle East Trophy.

Notable drivers include Hamda Al Qubaisi and her sister Amna Al Qubaisi who both formerly raced in F1 Academy, Rashid Al Dhaheri who competes in FRECA and Federico Al Rifai who won the 2024 F4 Saudi Arabian Championship.

== Cricket ==
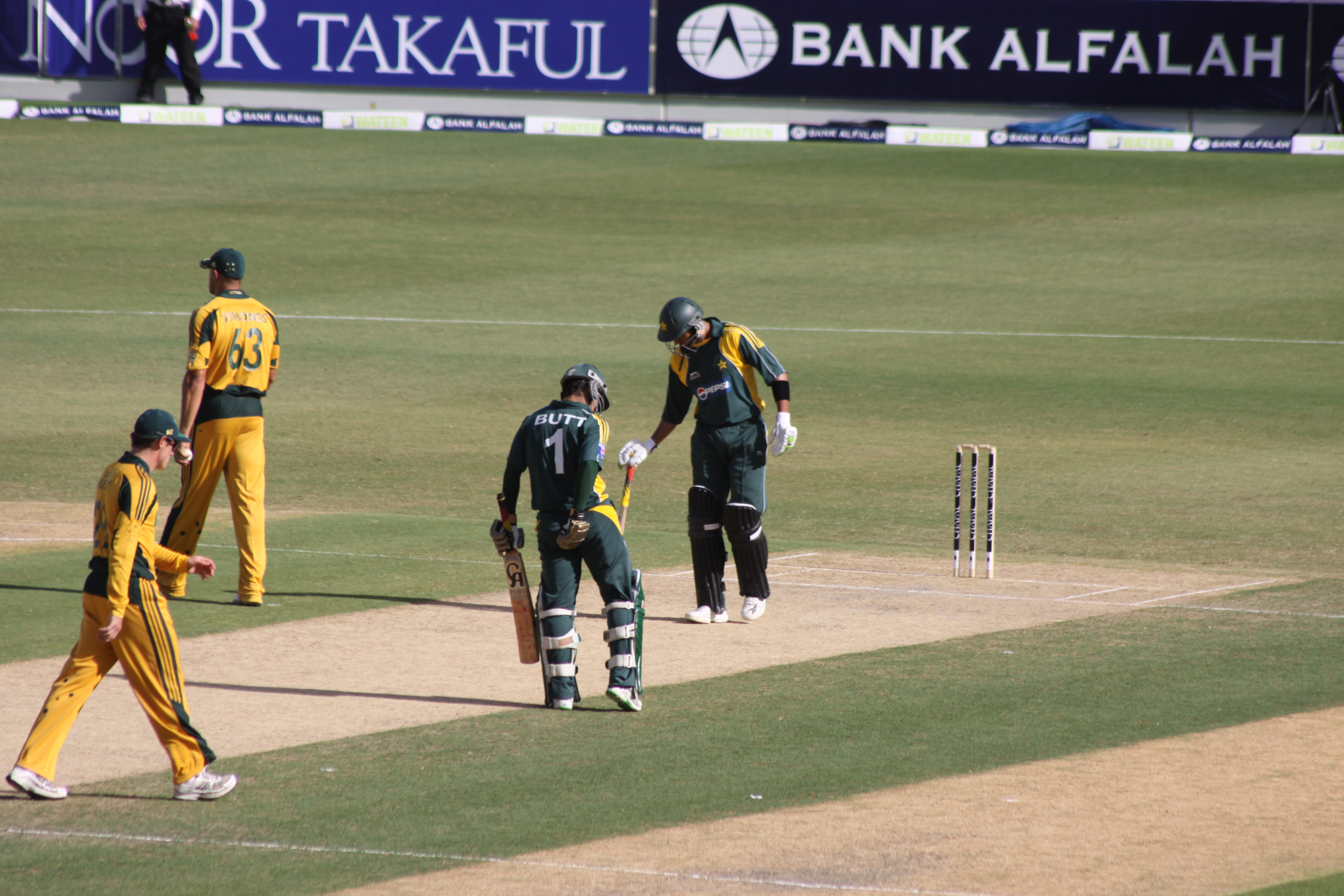
A cricket match between Australia and Pakistan in Dubai Sports City in 2009.

Dubai is home to the International Cricket Council.

== Badminton ==
BWF's "grassroots" programme, Shuttle Time Dubai, aims to broaden badminton's appeal and raise its profile in the emirate by working with 40 schools on how to teach and engage youth in the sport. The 'BWF Destination Dubai World Superseries Finals' leg was scheduled to be the first time the international tournament is hosted in the Middle East and enables the sport to connect with a whole new region of fans, explains BWF President Poul-Erik Høyer in his interview to Vision.

== Camel racing ==
Inhabitants of Arab States of the Persian Gulf have practiced camel racing. Robot jockeys have been used after government regulations were passed prohibiting underage jockeys from racing.

In 2021, an all-female camel racing team is formed.

The cloning industry has been receiving demands from customers wanting to reproduce better racing camels for competitions. Where a female camel may reproduce one calf in every two years, cloning industries have increased this number to an average of 10 to 20 babies every year. Animal rights groups have raised concerns regarding the process which causes the animals providing egg cells and carrying embryos to "undergo undue suffering".

== Cycling ==
There are places to cycle in Dubai, including Nad Al Sheba Cycle Path, Al Qudra Cycle Path and Jumeirah Open Beach Track. There is a 30 km (19 mi) cycling lane in Dubai's desert. Since 1 October 2019, cyclists risk getting their cycle confiscated if they ride outside of some cycle lanes in the city. Not wearing protective gear can also lead to confiscation of a cycle.

== Endurance riding ==
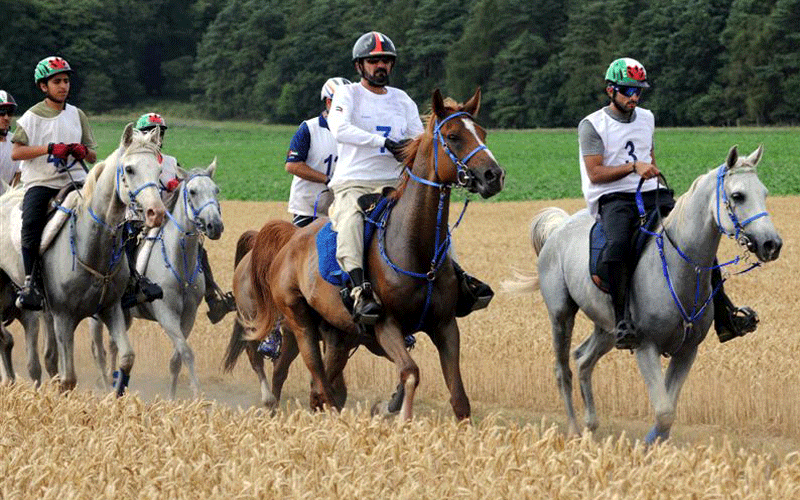
Sheikh Mohammed bin Rashid Al Maktoum and Sheikh Hamdan bin Mohammed Al Maktoum participating in an Endurance race.

Mohammed Bin Rashid Al Maktoum is an endurance rider. The Dubai Endurance City has practiced the sport and there are endurance yards.

== Falconry ==
Falconry is practiced.

== Gymnastics ==
Gymnastics, especially rhythmic gymnastics, is gaining significant popularity as a sport for women and youth in the UAE. The sport is increasingly recognized for its role in improving physical health, coordination, and discipline in youth athletes. This development aligns with national initiatives to promote active lifestyles and empower women in sports from an early age.

The sports infrastructure for gymnastics includes various private institutions across the emirates featuring coaches with international Olympic experience. Notable organizations providing professional training include the Dubai Youth Olympic School of Rhythmic Gymnastics, Gymnastika RG Club (Abu Dhabi, Dubai), Flying Roses Academy (Sharjah), Olympia Rak Gymnastics ( Ras Al Khaimah), and others.

In 2025, the UAE Gymnastics Federation was established to support this growth of sport. Hessa Al Kous, Head of Women in Sports at the Dubai Sports Council, noted that such milestones help "champion women in sport," while tournaments like “Gymnastika Solo Cup” showcases the UAE's commitment to fostering community-focused sporting excellence.

== Golf ==
The 2013 DP World Tour Championship at Jumeirah Golf Estates delivered a US$44 million gross economic benefit to Dubai, according to research commissioned by tournament organisers, The European Tour.

== Ice hockey ==
In 2018, new president of the Emirates Ice Hockey League (EHL) Vladimir Burdun was appointed. His role was to strengthen UAE ice hockey team and attract more business opportunities.

In 2019, Burdun announced the goal of entering a team in Kontinental Hockey League (KHL) which involved teams from Belarus, China, Finland, Latvia, Kazakhstan, Russia, and Slovakia by 2021. He also aimed at getting more players ready for KHL. A new ice arena was expected to open in Abu Dhabi, possibly before the end of 2019, with a seating capacity of 17,000 and that venue would meet all the requirements of KHL. The plan was to replicate the "success" of an NHL team situated in deserts, Vegas Golden Knights. KHL and former NHL players, such as Pavel Datsyuk, Sergei Mozyakin, Alexander Ovechkin were mentioned as prospects who might help to increase the future team's competitiveness.

== Squash ==
Squash lessons are available from ex-professionals and a Dubai Open Squash is even held with a $25,000 cash prize to the winner.

== Table tennis ==
Ping Pong Dubai is a nonprofit community initiative aimed at encouraging people from all walks of life to pick up a bat and play table tennis.

== Others ==
1. Corporate Games
2. USIP Police Games
3. Police Challenge Sports
4. Turf Games - Since 2017
5. NAS Sport Games - Since 2014 - 12th in 2025
6. WSG Dubai - World School Sports Games - Since 2018
7. Dubai Active Show (Muscle Show / IFBB Pro / Arnold Classic) - Since 2018
8. Red Bull Racing - Red Bull Air Race World Championship
9. Power Boating

== See also ==
- Traditional sports in the United Arab Emirates

== 2025 ==
The UAE achieved a record-breaking year in 2025 across national and individual sports in regional and international competitions. The nation celebrated historic performances in multi-sport events, highlighted by major medal hauls at the GCC Beach Games, Asian Youth Games, and Islamic Solidarity Games. In football, Sharjah FC claimed its first AFC Champions League Two title, while in jiu-jitsu, the UAE continued its historic dominance with a 50-medal haul at the World Championships in Thailand.
