= Emirates Sports Group =

- Type: Private
- Industry: Sports management; Hospitality
- Founder: Vladimir Burdun
- Headquarters: Dubai, United Arab Emirates
- Key people: Vladimir Burdun (CEO)
- Website: emiratessports.com

Emirates Sports Group (ESG) is a sports management and hospitality organization based in the United Arab Emirates.

== History ==
Emirates Sports Group was founded by Vladimir Burdun, who moved to Dubai in 1995, initially focusing on martial arts. He opened a martial arts academy in Dubai in 2003 and expanded it to 18 locations by 2011. He also organized professional combat sports events in the UAE, such as mixed martial arts (MMA), kickboxing, and Thai boxing.

In 2016, ESG organized World Strongman Federation's first UAE event while Burdun served as president of the World Strongman Federation.

Since 2010, ESG has been involved in developing local ice hockey. In 2018, Burdun became president of the Emirates Ice Hockey League (EHL).

In 2024, ESG founded the Association for the Development of Corporate Sports to introduce winter sports in the UAE.

== Projects ==
=== Emirates Sports Hotel and Apartments ===
Emirates Sports Hotel and Apartments is a hotel complex located in Dubai Sports City. It was opened in 2022 to provide accommodation, training, and recovery facilities to athletes and sports teams.

=== Emirates Sports Arena ===
The Emirates Sports Arena is a multi-purpose ice rink located in Dubai, which is managed by ESG and has the capacity to seat 570 spectators. It will be opened in September 2025.

=== Emirates Hockey League (EHL) ===
The Emirates Ice Hockey League (EHL) is the national ice hockey league of the UAE, founded in 2009 by the UAE Ice Sports Federation and recognized by the International Ice Hockey Federation (IIHF). The league comprises six teams, Dubai Mighty Camels, Abu Dhabi Storms, Abu Dhabi Shaheen Falcons, Al Ain Theebs, Dubai White Bears, and Galaxy Warriors. It is managed by ESG.

=== Dubai Mighty Camels ===
The Dubai Mighty Camels is an ice hockey team owned by ESG. It was originally formed by expatriates from Canada and Sweden and was the UAE's first organized ice hockey club and a founding member of the EHL in 2009. The Mighty Camels have won multiple championships, holding a record five EHL titles as of 2025. During Burdun's management in the 2010s, the club integrated more Emirati players.

=== World Strongman International Union ===
The World Strongman International Union (WSIU), founded in 2003, is an international federation promoting strength athletics under ESG's patronage headed by Vladimir Burdun. It annually organizes the World Strongman Championship at Emirates Sports Hotel in Dubai Sports City and has advocated for its inclusion in the Olympic Games programme.
