= AlUla Camel Cup =

Camel racing event in Saudi Arabia

The AlUla Camel Cup is a four-day camel racing event held in Saudi Arabia. So far, there have only been two iterations of the competition - in 2023 and 2024.

Camel racing is a form of racing in which jockeys riding on camels compete against each other to finish a set number of laps around a circular racetrack. Camels can run at speeds up to 65 km/h (18 m/s; 40 mph) in short sprints and they can maintain a speed of 40 km/h (11 m/s; 25 mph) for an hour. At the AlUla Camel Cup, camels are controlled by remote controlled robotic whips, and the competition's races are between 4–8 km long.

As well as elite racing, the AlUla Camel Cup also comprises fashion, retail offerings, live performers and dining outlets, as well as family activities at the Mughayra Heritage Sports Village, a stone's throw away from the race tracks.

The Royal Commission for AlUla's (RCU) Vice President of Destination Management and Marketing, Rami AlMoallim, said that the AlUla Camel Cup resonates with the passion of Saudi society, and has a deep cultural significance as it reflects the Kingdom's enduring heritage and traditions.

== Races ==
There are 16 races across the 4 day event. On the first day, there are six “Marathon” races, with the winners receiving a silver vase. Across the following two days, eight more races take place. Two 4 km “Hagayeg” and two 5 km “Lagaya” contests on the first day, and the second day showcases two 6 km “Jiza” and two 8 km “Thanaya” events. Victors in these races are awarded a beautifully crafted dish.

The competition culminates on the final day, when camels aged six years and above take part in two prestigious one-round, 8 km races: “Heil” and “Zmoul.” The winning owners of these races will be honoured with the presentation of a magnificent AlUla Camel Cup.

== Prize pool and trophies ==
The AlUla Camel Cup is the most lucrative competition in camel racing. Organised by the Royal Commission for AlUla, and hosted in partnership with the Saudi Camel Racing Federation, the prize pool across the 16 races reached more than $6.4 million in 2024.

The winners of the final two races of the AlUla Camel Cup receive a specially designed trophy, crafted by English silversmiths, Thomas Lyte. The trophies are made from sterling silver and 24-carat gold plate.
