= Labsah =

- Location within United Arab Emirates
- Coordinates: 25°25′42.8″N 55°43′42.1″E
- Country: United Arab Emirates
- Emirate: Umm Al Quwain

Labsah is a village inland of the Emirate of Umm Al Quwain, United Arab Emirates. It is the location of the Al Labsah Camel Racing Track.

== Camel racing ==
The fertile area around Labsah is the site of extensive camel camps and farms, operated by a number of breeding and racing operations. There is also extensive agricultural development and Labsah is the location of an Abu Dhabi Food Control Authority slaughterhouse, one of several such facilities in the Emirates.

Camel racing at Labsah normally takes place at weekends throughout the cooler winter months.

In 2017, the 4km track played host to the 6th edition of the Mohammed bin Zayed Arabian Camel Racing Festival, an annual event held under the patronage of the Crown Prince of Abu Dhabi, Sheikh Mohammed bin Zayed Al Nahyan. The event rotates annually between emirates, launching in 2012 at Ras Al Khaimah before Umm Al Quwain (2013); Sharjah (2014) and Ras Al Khaiman (2015 and 2016). The five-day heritage sports event, held from 8 January 2017, comprised a total of 125 races. It returned to Labsah in 2024.

Labsah sits on the Umm Al Quwain/Sharjah border and directly to the Sharjah side of Labsah is the Sharjah government car pound.

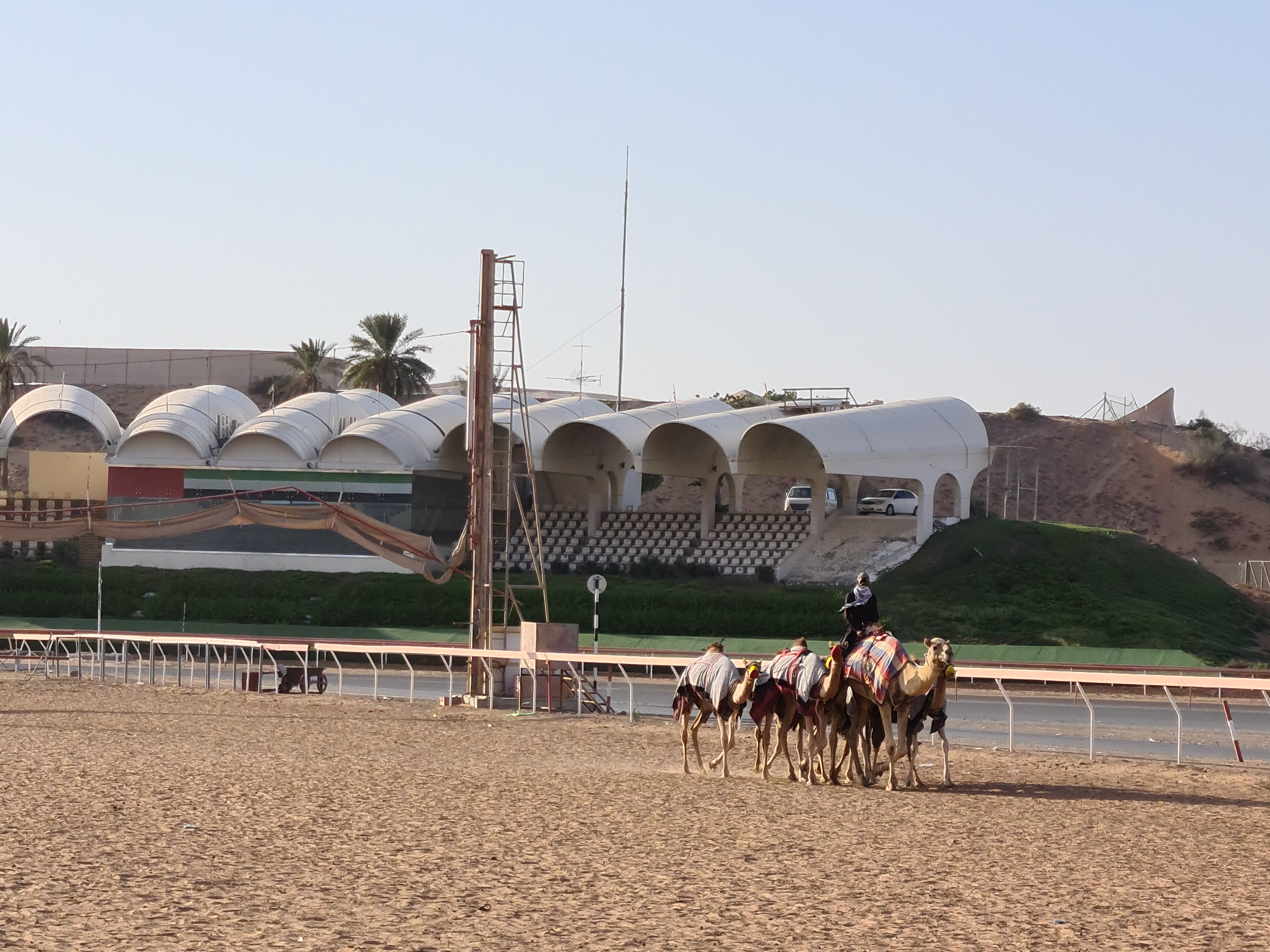
The grandstand at Labsah Camel Racing Track

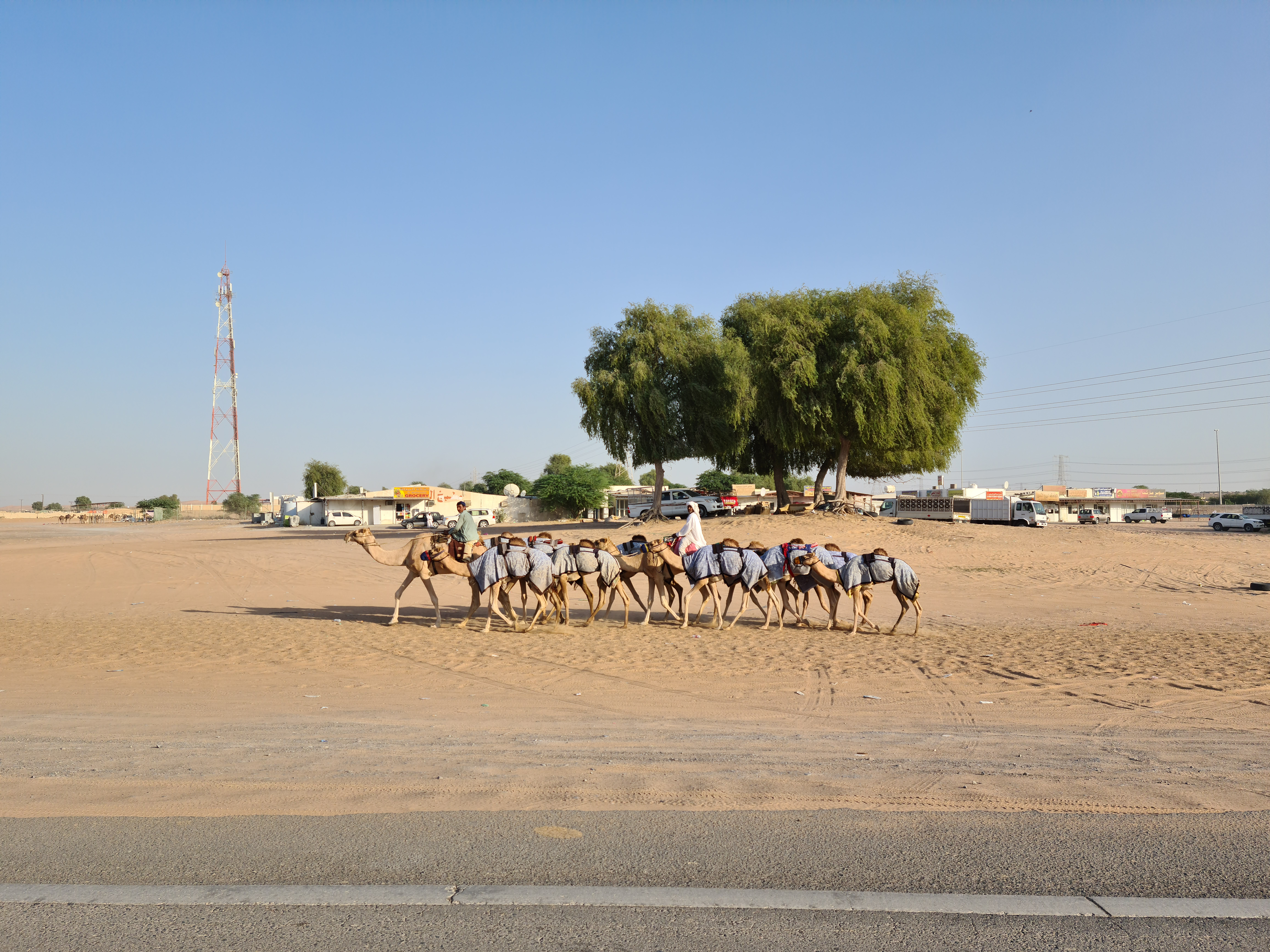
The village of Labsah

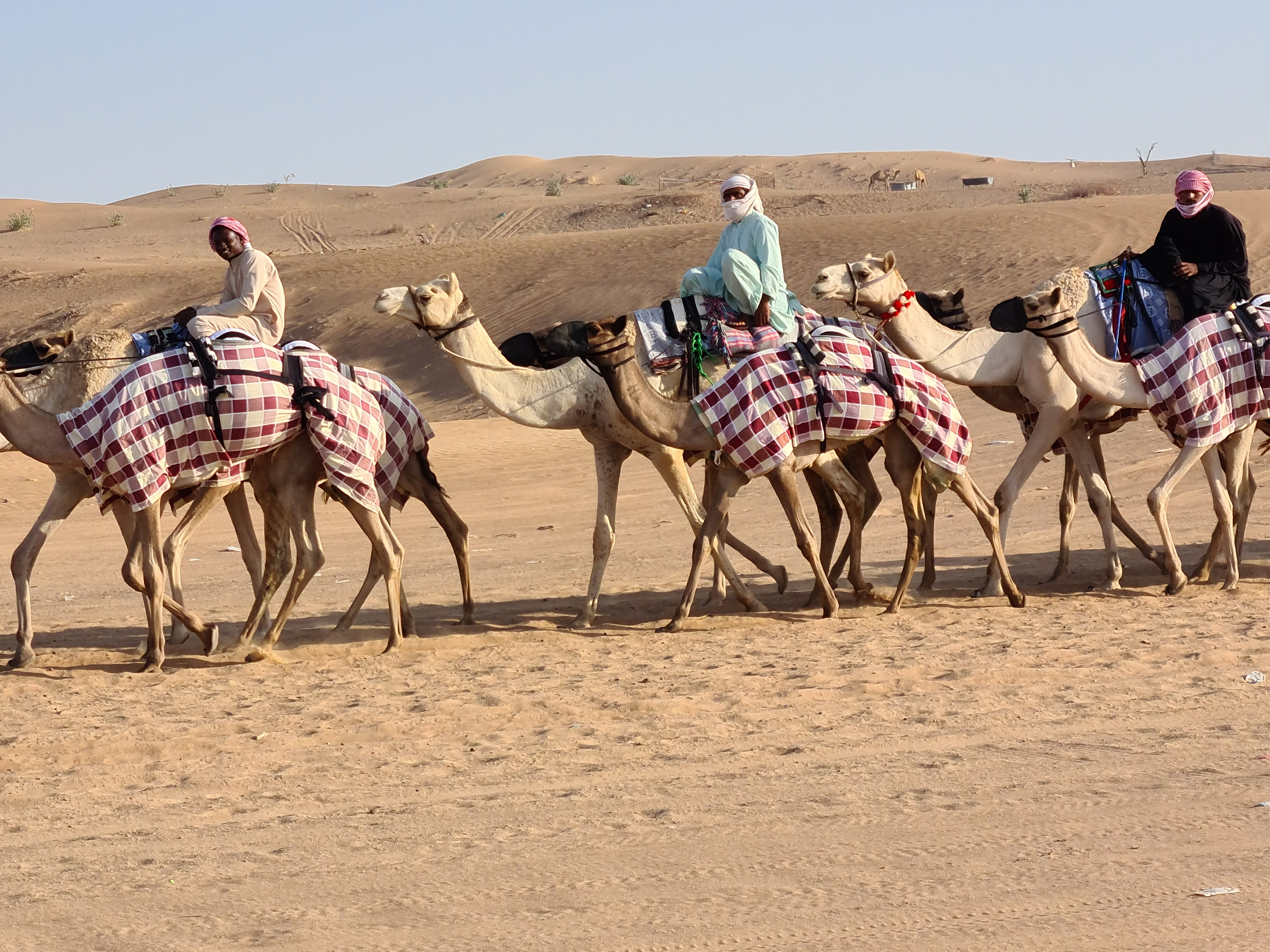
Camels under training at Labsah Race Track
