= Alexei Emelin =

Russian ice hockey player (born 1986)

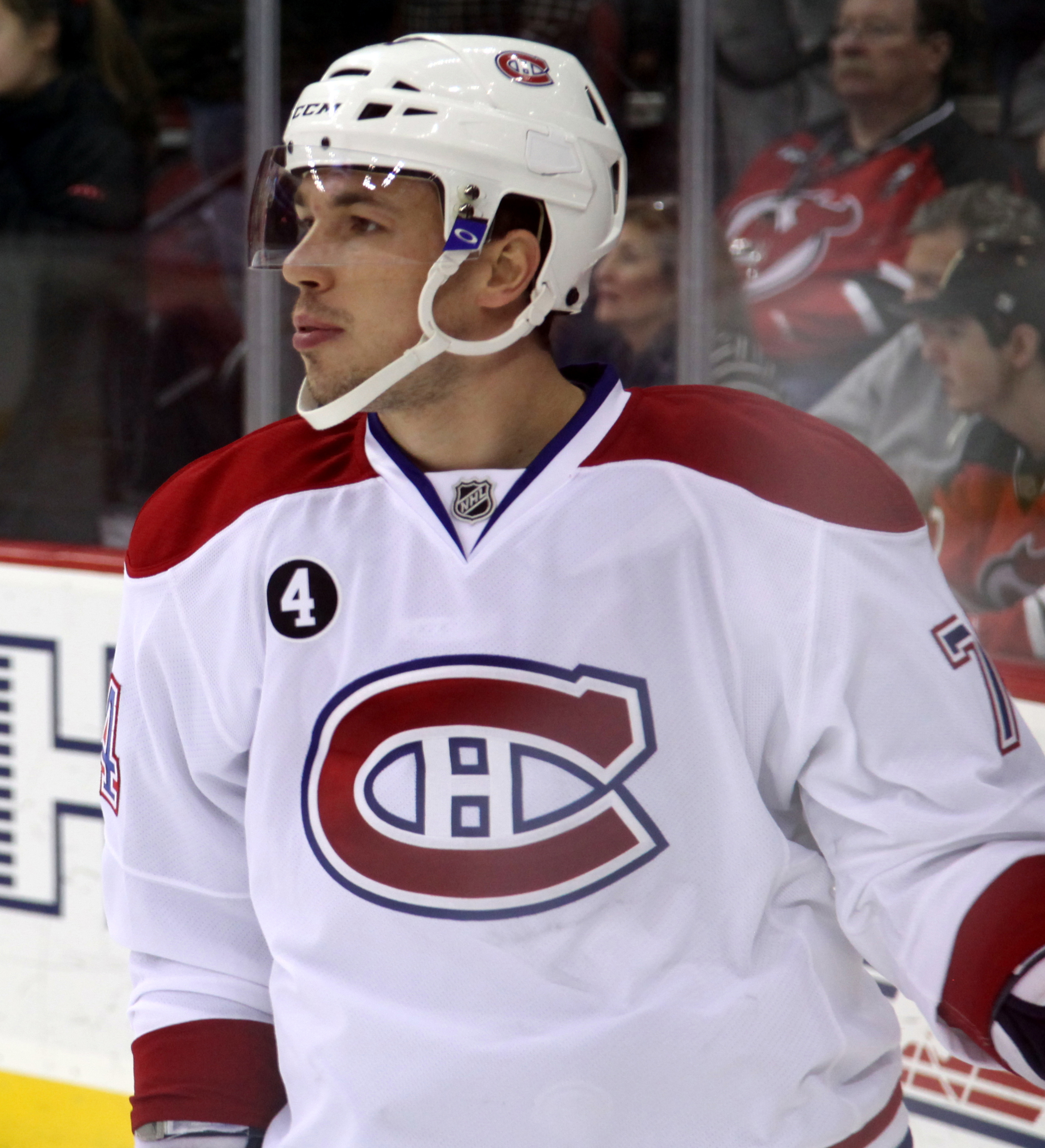
- Emelin with the Montreal Canadiens in 2015
- Born: 25 April 1986 (age 40) Tolyatti, Russian SFSR, Soviet Union
- Height: 6 ft 2 in (188 cm)
- Weight: 214 lb (97 kg; 15 st 4 lb)
- Position: Defence
- Shoots: Left
- EHL team Former teams: Dubai Red Stars; Lada Togliatti; Ak Bars Kazan; Montreal Canadiens; Nashville Predators; Avangard Omsk; Dinamo Minsk; Spartak Moscow
- National team: Russia
- NHL draft: 84th overall, 2004; Montreal Canadiens
- Playing career: 2003-2023; 2025–present

Alexei Vyacheslavovich Emelin (Russian: Алексей Вячеславович Емелин; born 25 April 1986) is a Russian professional ice hockey defenceman who plays for the Dubai Red Stars of the Emirates Ice Hockey League. He was selected in the third round, 84th overall, by the Montreal Canadiens in the 2004 NHL entry draft. Emelin has also previously played for the Nashville Predators.

== Playing career ==
=== Early career ===
Emelin spent a large portion of his career with Lada Togliatti in the Russian Superleague (RSL) before signing with Ak Bars Kazan. He was also a member of Russia's under-18 and under-20 national squads, and has also become a regular member of the senior national team, skating for both in EuroTour and the World Championships.

In a Kontinental Hockey League (KHL) game in 2009, Emelin sustained a face injury during a fight with Alexander Svitov; an orbital bone shattered and had to be rebuilt with metal plate. He has tried to avoid getting into fights ever since the incident.

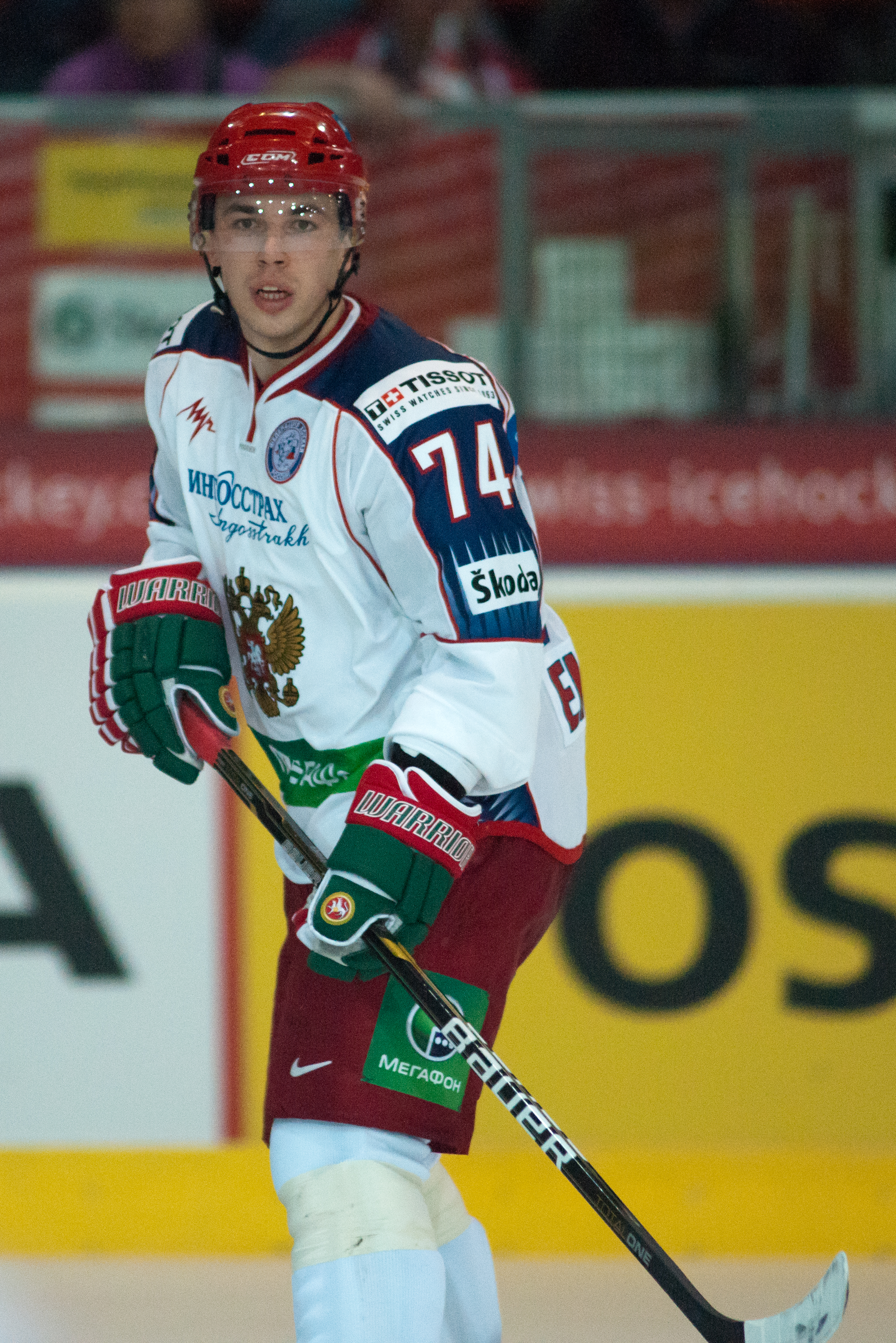
Emelin playing for Russia in 2011

=== Montreal Canadiens ===
On 17 May 2011, Emelin signed a one-year, two-way contract with the Montreal Canadiens for the 2011–12 season. He played his first regular season NHL game on 9 October, in a 5–1 victory against the Winnipeg Jets. In addition, he scored his first regular season NHL point, an assist, on 6 December, in a game against the Columbus Blue Jackets. On 25 January 2012, he scored his first NHL goal against the Detroit Red Wings.

On 30 June 2012, Emelin signed a two-year extension up until the end of the 2013–14 season.

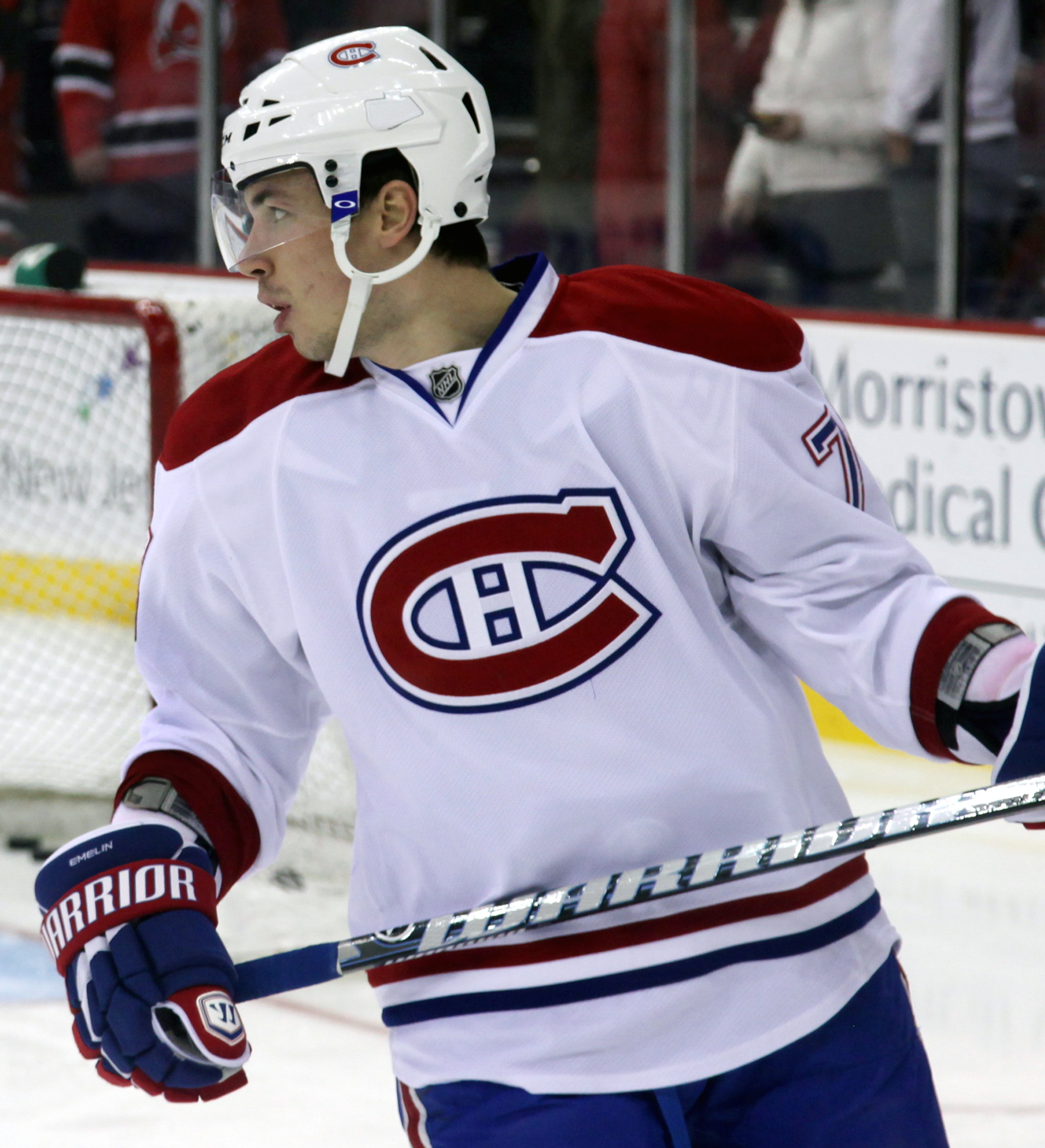
Emelin with the Montreal Canadiens in 2012

During the lockout shortened 2012–13 season, Emelin established himself as a key member of the Canadiens' defensive core, often playing with fellow countryman Andrei Markov. He scored three goals and 12 points in 38 games for the Canadiens and finished with a plus-minus rating of +2. His season, however, was derailed by an injury during a game against the Boston Bruins on 6 April 2013, when Emelin collided with Bruins forward Milan Lucic, falling awkwardly and tearing a ligament in his left knee. As a result, Emelin missed the remainder of the regular season and the playoffs. On 31 October 2013, he signed a four-year contract extension with Montreal, lasting through the 2017–18 season.

=== Nashville Predators ===
After his sixth season with the Canadiens, Emelin was left exposed at the 2017 NHL Expansion Draft. He was selected by the Vegas Golden Knights on 21 June 2017. On 1 July 2017, the Golden Knights traded Emelin to the Nashville Predators in exchange for a third-round pick in the 2019 NHL entry draft. Vegas retained approximately $1.2 million USD of Emelin's salary in the trade. Emelin skated in 76 games with the Predators in his lone season with the club, as well as 10 postseason games.

=== Avangard Omsk ===
On 2 September 2018, Emelin returned as a free agent to the KHL, signing a three-year contract with Avangard Omsk.

=== Dinamo Minsk and Spartak Moscow ===
After four seasons with Avangard Omsk, Emelin left as a free agent and extended his career in the KHL after signing a one-year contract with Belarusian club, HC Dinamo Minsk, on 26 July 2022. Selected as team captain for Dinamo Minsk in the lead up to the 2022–23 season, Emelin as a regular on the blueline made 38 appearances and registered 9 assists.

On 19 December 2022, Emelin left Dinamo and transferred to HC Spartak Moscow for the remainder of the season.

=== Dubai Red Stars ===
On October 8, 2025, it was reported that Emelin had signed a one-year contract with the Dubai Red Stars of the Emirates Hockey League following a 2 1/2 year hiatus from the sport.

== Career statistics ==
=== Regular season and playoffs ===
| | | | Regular season | | | | | Playoffs |
| Season | Team | League | GP | G | A | Pts | PIM | GP | G | A | Pts | PIM |
|---|---|---|---|---|---|---|---|---|---|---|---|---|
| 2002–03 | Lada–2 Togliatti | RUS.3 | 31 | 1 | 1 | 2 | 20 | — | — | — | — | — |
| 2003–04 | Lada–2 Togliatti | RUS.3 | 2 | 0 | 0 | 0 | 10 | — | — | — | — | — |
| 2003–04 | CSK VVS Samara | RUS.2 | 53 | 2 | 4 | 6 | 198 | 1 | 0 | 0 | 0 | 18 |
| 2004–05 | Lada Togliatti | RSL | 12 | 0 | 1 | 1 | 24 | 2 | 0 | 0 | 0 | 2 |
| 2004–05 | Lada–2 Togliatti | RUS.3 | 11 | 3 | 2 | 5 | 14 | — | — | — | — | — |
| 2005–06 | Lada Togliatti | RSL | 44 | 6 | 6 | 12 | 131 | 6 | 0 | 1 | 1 | 47 |
| 2006–07 | Lada Togliatti | RSL | 43 | 2 | 5 | 7 | 74 | 3 | 0 | 0 | 0 | 4 |
| 2007–08 | Ak Bars Kazan | RSL | 56 | 0 | 5 | 5 | 123 | 10 | 0 | 1 | 1 | 10 |
| 2008–09 | Ak Bars Kazan | KHL | 51 | 0 | 3 | 3 | 58 | 7 | 1 | 0 | 1 | 10 |
| 2009–10 | Ak Bars Kazan | KHL | 46 | 1 | 6 | 7 | 50 | 22 | 5 | 8 | 13 | 24 |
| 2010–11 | Ak Bars Kazan | KHL | 52 | 11 | 15 | 26 | 117 | 9 | 0 | 0 | 0 | 4 |
| 2011–12 | Montreal Canadiens | NHL | 67 | 3 | 4 | 7 | 30 | — | — | — | — | — |
| 2012–13 | Ak Bars Kazan | KHL | 24 | 2 | 7 | 9 | 40 | — | — | — | — | — |
| 2012–13 | Montreal Canadiens | NHL | 38 | 3 | 9 | 12 | 33 | — | — | — | — | — |
| 2013–14 | Montreal Canadiens | NHL | 59 | 3 | 14 | 17 | 59 | 15 | 0 | 2 | 2 | 4 |
| 2014–15 | Montreal Canadiens | NHL | 68 | 3 | 11 | 14 | 59 | 12 | 0 | 2 | 2 | 10 |
| 2015–16 | Montreal Canadiens | NHL | 72 | 0 | 12 | 12 | 71 | — | — | — | — | — |
| 2016–17 | Montreal Canadiens | NHL | 76 | 2 | 8 | 10 | 71 | 2 | 1 | 0 | 1 | 2 |
| 2017–18 | Nashville Predators | NHL | 76 | 1 | 8 | 9 | 40 | 10 | 0 | 0 | 0 | 0 |
| 2018–19 | Avangard Omsk | KHL | 48 | 5 | 14 | 19 | 20 | 19 | 1 | 4 | 5 | 20 |
| 2019–20 | Avangard Omsk | KHL | 16 | 0 | 1 | 1 | 51 | 6 | 2 | 1 | 3 | 6 |
| 2020–21 | Avangard Omsk | KHL | 59 | 6 | 15 | 21 | 73 | 12 | 1 | 2 | 3 | 4 |
| 2021–22 | Avangard Omsk | KHL | 43 | 2 | 6 | 8 | 35 | 13 | 2 | 3 | 5 | 6 |
| 2022–23 | Dinamo Minsk | KHL | 38 | 0 | 9 | 9 | 22 | — | — | — | — | — |
| 2022–23 | Spartak Moscow | KHL | 21 | 0 | 3 | 3 | 6 | — | — | — | — | — |
| RSL totals | | | 155 | 8 | 17 | 25 | 352 | 21 | 0 | 2 | 2 | 63 |
| KHL totals | | | 398 | 27 | 80 | 107 | 447 | 88 | 12 | 18 | 30 | 74 |
| NHL totals | | | 456 | 15 | 66 | 81 | 363 | 39 | 1 | 4 | 5 | 16 |

=== International ===
Medal record

Representing Russia

World Championships
| Gold medal – first place | 2012 Finland/Sweden | |
| Silver medal – second place | 2010 Germany | |
| Bronze medal – third place | 2007 Russia | |
| Bronze medal – third place | 2016 Russia | |

World Junior Championships
| Silver medal – second place | 2005 United States | |
| Silver medal – second place | 2006 Canada | |

World U18 Championships
| Gold medal – first place | 2004 Belarus | |

| Year | Team | Event | Result | GP | G | A | Pts | PIM |
|---|---|---|---|---|---|---|---|---|
| 2004 | Russia | WJC18 | 1st place, gold medalist(s) | 6 | 0 | 0 | 0 | 10 |
| 2005 | Russia | WJC | 2nd place, silver medalist(s) | 6 | 1 | 0 | 1 | 8 |
| 2006 | Russia | WJC | 2nd place, silver medalist(s) | 6 | 2 | 5 | 7 | 39 |
| 2007 | Russia | WC | 3rd place, bronze medalist(s) | 9 | 1 | 2 | 3 | 6 |
| 2010 | Russia | WC | 2nd place, silver medalist(s) | 9 | 1 | 1 | 2 | 33 |
| 2011 | Russia | WC | 4th | 9 | 0 | 0 | 0 | 29 |
| 2012 | Russia | WC | 1st place, gold medalist(s) | 9 | 2 | 2 | 4 | 4 |
| 2014 | Russia | OG | 5th | 5 | 0 | 0 | 0 | 8 |
| 2016 | Russia | WC | 3rd place, bronze medalist(s) | 10 | 0 | 1 | 1 | 25 |
| 2016 | Russia | WCH | 4th | 4 | 0 | 1 | 1 | 0 |
| Junior totals | | | | 18 | 3 | 5 | 8 | 57 |
| Senior totals | | | | 44 | 4 | 7 | 11 | 105 |

== Awards and honors ==
| Award | Year |
|---|---|
KHL
| Gagarin Cup (Ak Bars Kazan) | 2009, 2010 |
| All-Star Game | 2013 |
| Gagarin Cup (Avangard Omsk) | 2021 |
