= Alice Springs Camel Cup =

Annual camel racing festival held in Australia

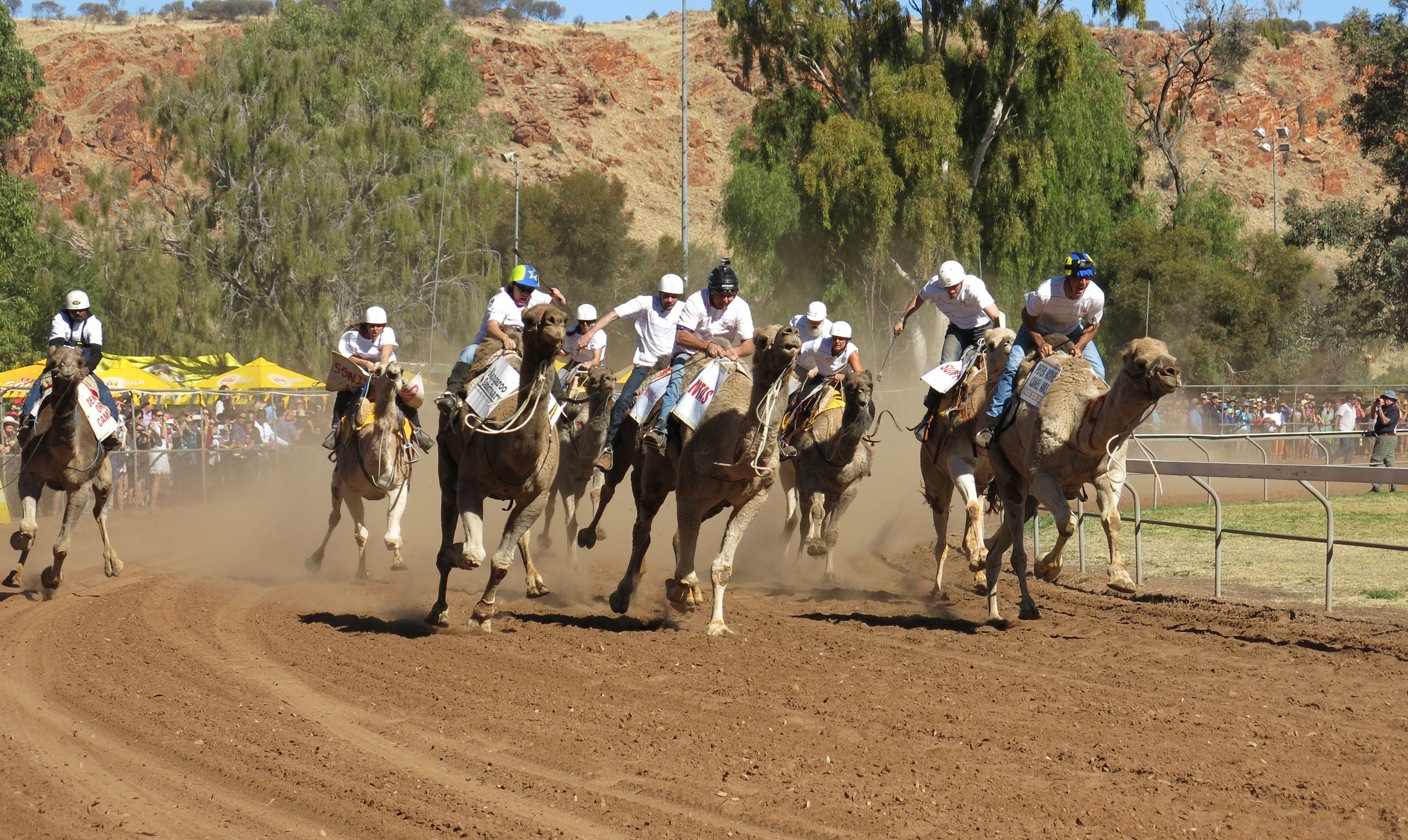
- Alice Springs Camel Cup in 2015
- Frequency: annually
- Venue: Blatherskite Park
- Locations: Alice Springs, NT
- Country: Australia

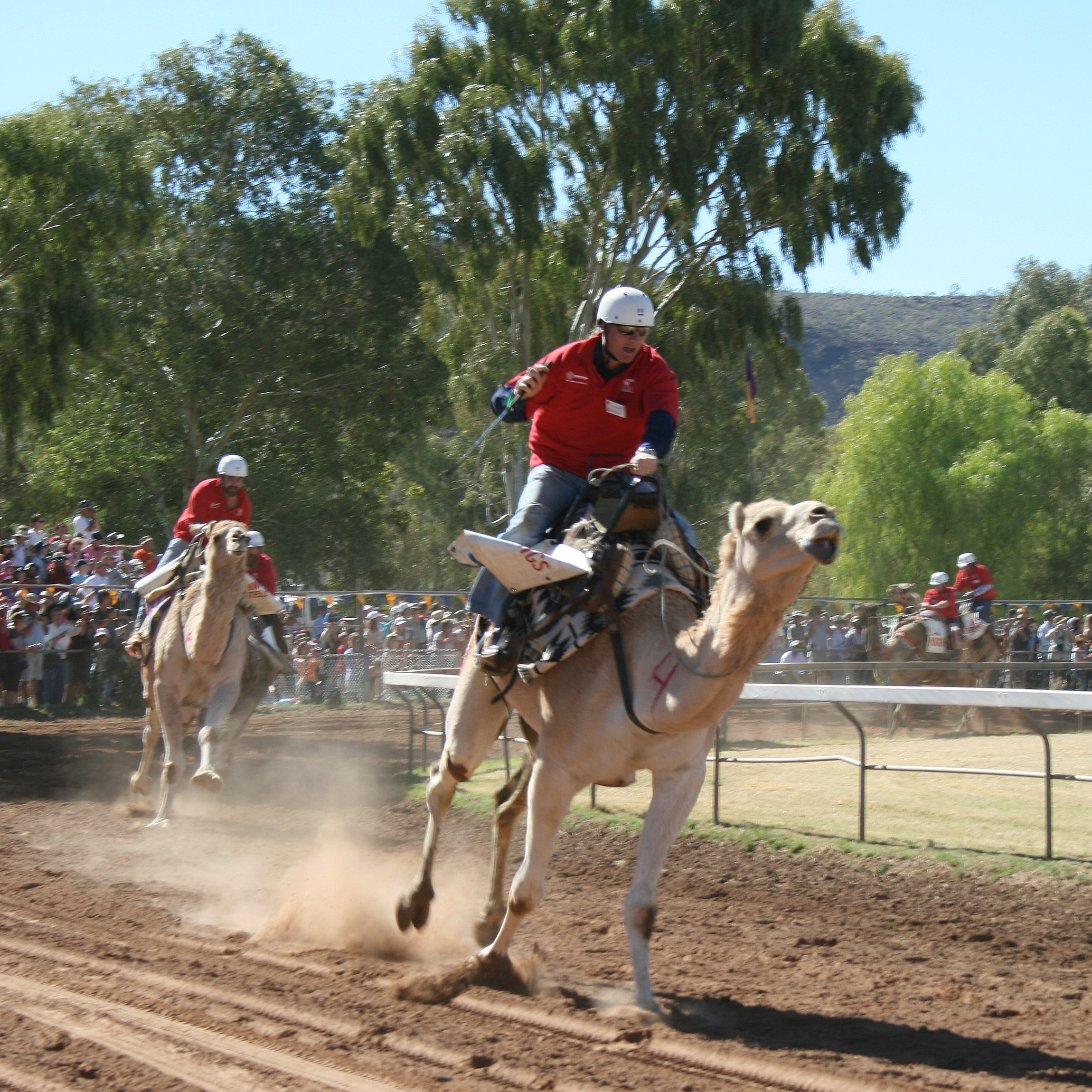
Camel racing during the 2009 Camel Cup.

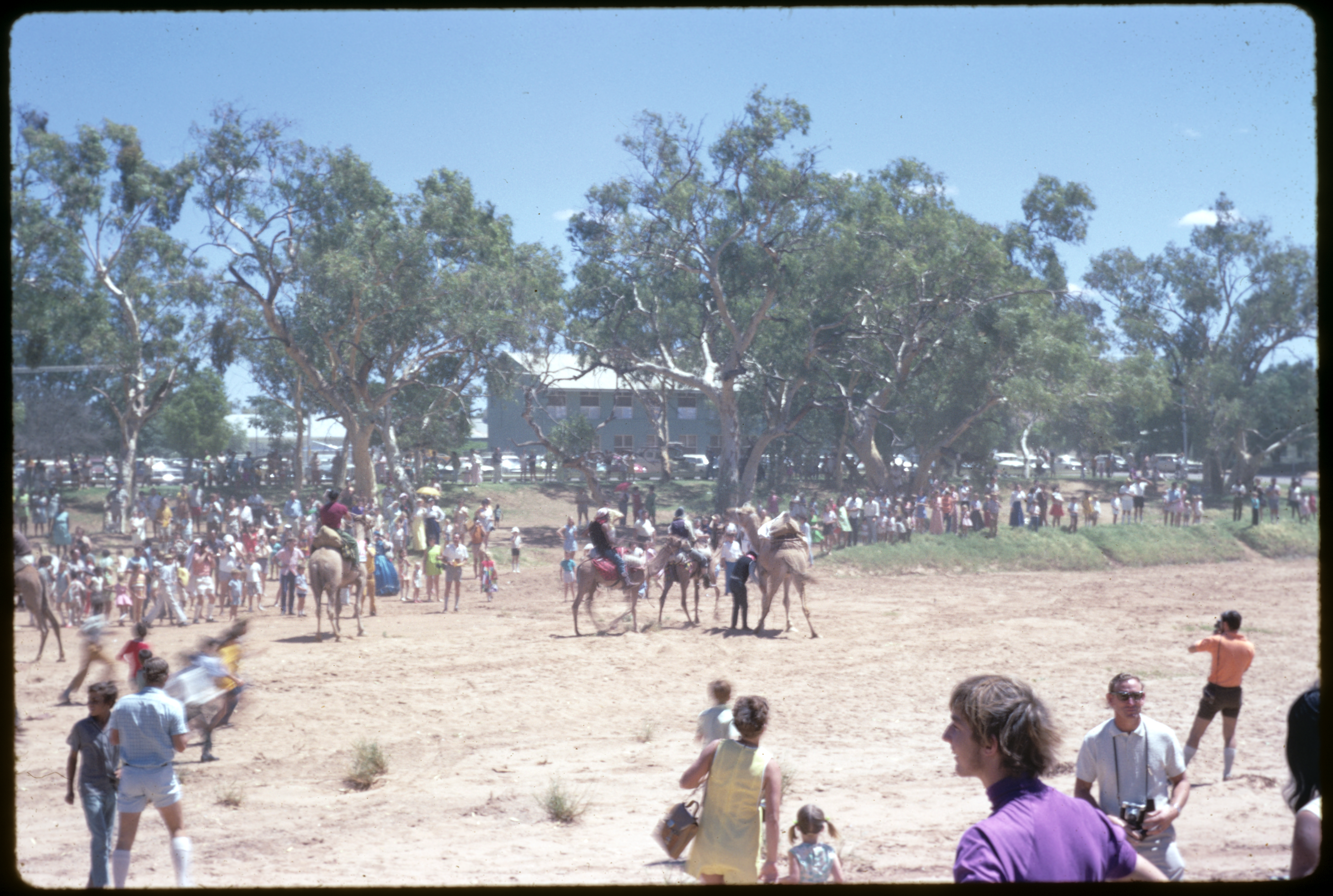
The 1971 Camel Cup

The Alice Springs Camel Cup is an annual camel racing festival held in Australia. The race usually occurs at Blatherskite Park in Alice Springs, Northern Territory. The event is organised by the Lions Club of Alice Springs.

== History ==
The first such event was held in 1970 in the dry bed of the Todd River (Lhere Mparntwe) between two Lions Club members Noel Fullerton and Keith Mooney-Smith.

After being held at a number of short term locations in 1979 the race was transferred to a track specially built for camel racing at Blatherskite Park.

== See also ==
- Sport in the Northern Territory
