= Boulia Camel Races =

Annual Australian camel race

- Status: active
- Begins: 15 July 2022
- Ends: 17 July 2022
- Frequency: Annually
- Venue: Boulia Racecourse
- Locations: Boulia, QLD
- Coordinates: 22.9097°S 139.9066°E
- Country: Australia
- Years active: 29
- Inaugurated: 1997
- Organiser: Boulia Camel Races Incorporated
- Sponsors: Tourism & Events Queensland, Outback Queensland, Boulia Shire Council, Channel 7, HIT 102.5
- Website: www.bouliacamelraces.com.au

The Boulia Camel Races is an Australian camel race held annually every third weekend of July in Boulia, Queensland since 1997. Sometimes called the Melbourne Cup of camel racing, the event is home to the Boulia Camel Cup, the longest camel race in Australia run over 1500 metres. Races are overseen by the regulatory body Racing Queensland.

Additional entertainment throughout the event include a camel tagging competitions, yabby races, fireworks, children's amusements, live entertainment and novelty races including the 'Great Australian Ride-on Lawnmower Race'. Boulia which a population of 300 people increases to 3,000 people during the races.

== Qualifying ==
The three day event culminates in the major Boulia Camel Cup race. To qualify, camels must have competed in both the 400m and 1000m heats held across the previous days' racing.

- The minimum age of racing camels in 3 years and bulls are allowed to race as long as they are not in season.
- The racetrack is a U shape, with camels racing clockwise.
- The maximum number of camels per race is 18

== 2023 Event ==
The 2023 event took place from 14–16 July 2023, with two days of professional camel racing on Saturday and Sunday.

== 2022 Event ==
The 2022 event took place over three days from 15–17 July 2022. This is the 25th Anniversary event of Boulia Camel Races. Winner of both the 1500m Camel Cup and also the Quarter Mile Flyer was local team Woodhouse Camels, with camel Gunna ridden by jockey Kyrraley Woodhouse and rained by Tom Woodhouse.

== 2021 Event ==
Along with new sponsoring partner Thirsty Camel Bottleshops, the Boulia Camel Races offered a record $45,000 AUD prize pool for competitors in the 2021 Thirsty Camel Cup race. The cup final was won by jockey Kelly Cloan and camel trainer Roman Czubak.

The Boulia Camel Races had originally been set to celebrate the event's 25th anniversary in 2021, however due to the cancelled event in 2020 the anniversary celebration was pushed back to 2022. The 2021 event was one of the first to return following the COVID-19 pandemic shutdowns.

== 2020 Event ==
Due to COVID-19 travel restrictions throughout the state of Queensland in 2019, the Boulia Camel Races were cancelled in 2020.

== 2019 Event ==
In 2019 the Boulia Camel Cup was won by local camel trainers Dannileah Stewart and Ronnie Callope. This was the first win by a local since 2014, and the weekend drew eight thousand fans.

== 2018 Event ==
In 2018 the Boulia Camel Cup was won by New South Wales jockey Chontelle Jannesse on camel 'Uncle Bob', trained by Road Sansom.

== 2017 Event ==
In 2017 the winner of the 1500m final was Shepparton camel jockey Glenda Sutton

== Gallery ==
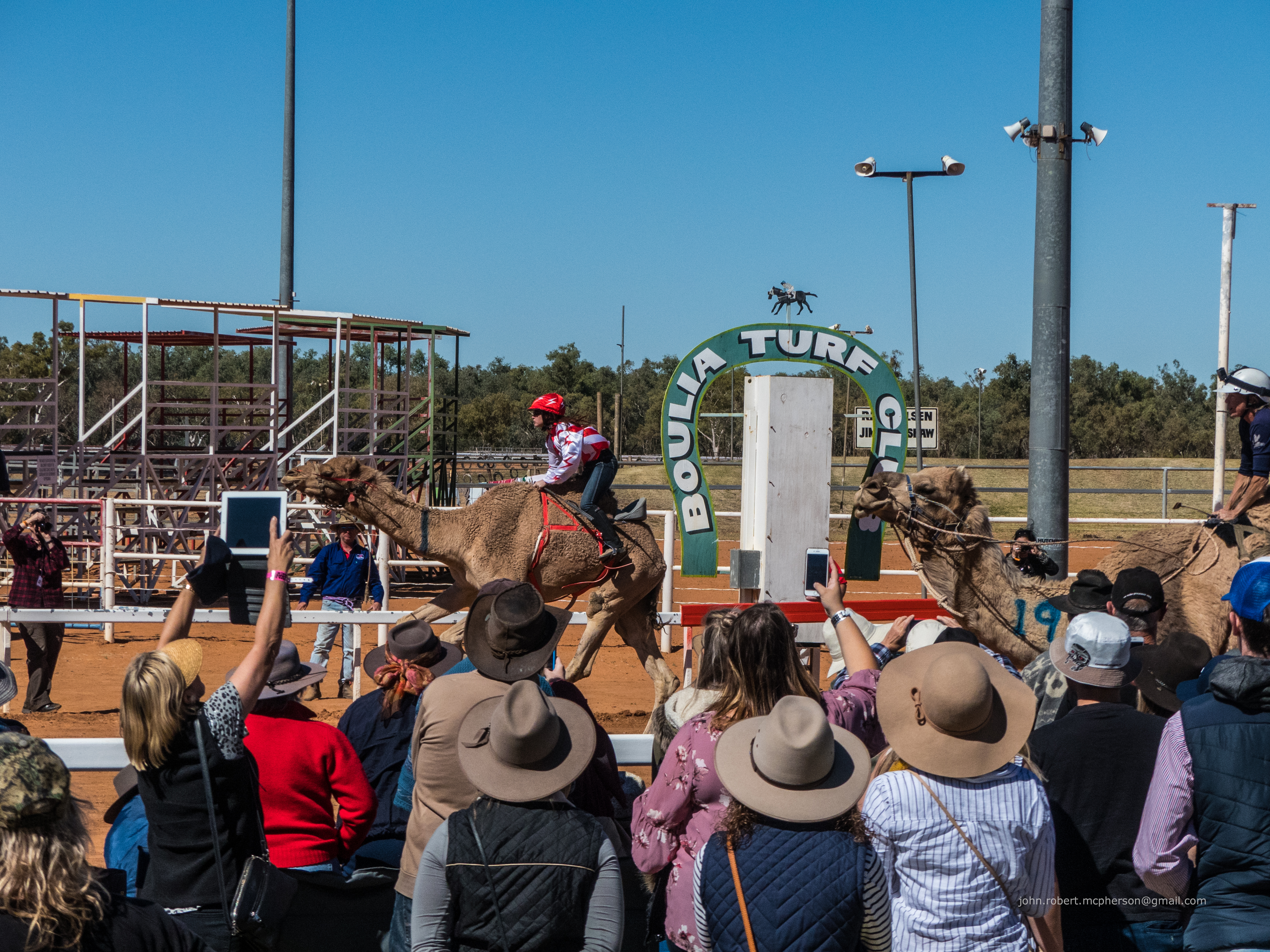
Boulia Camel Races, Boulia Turf Club, July 2018.

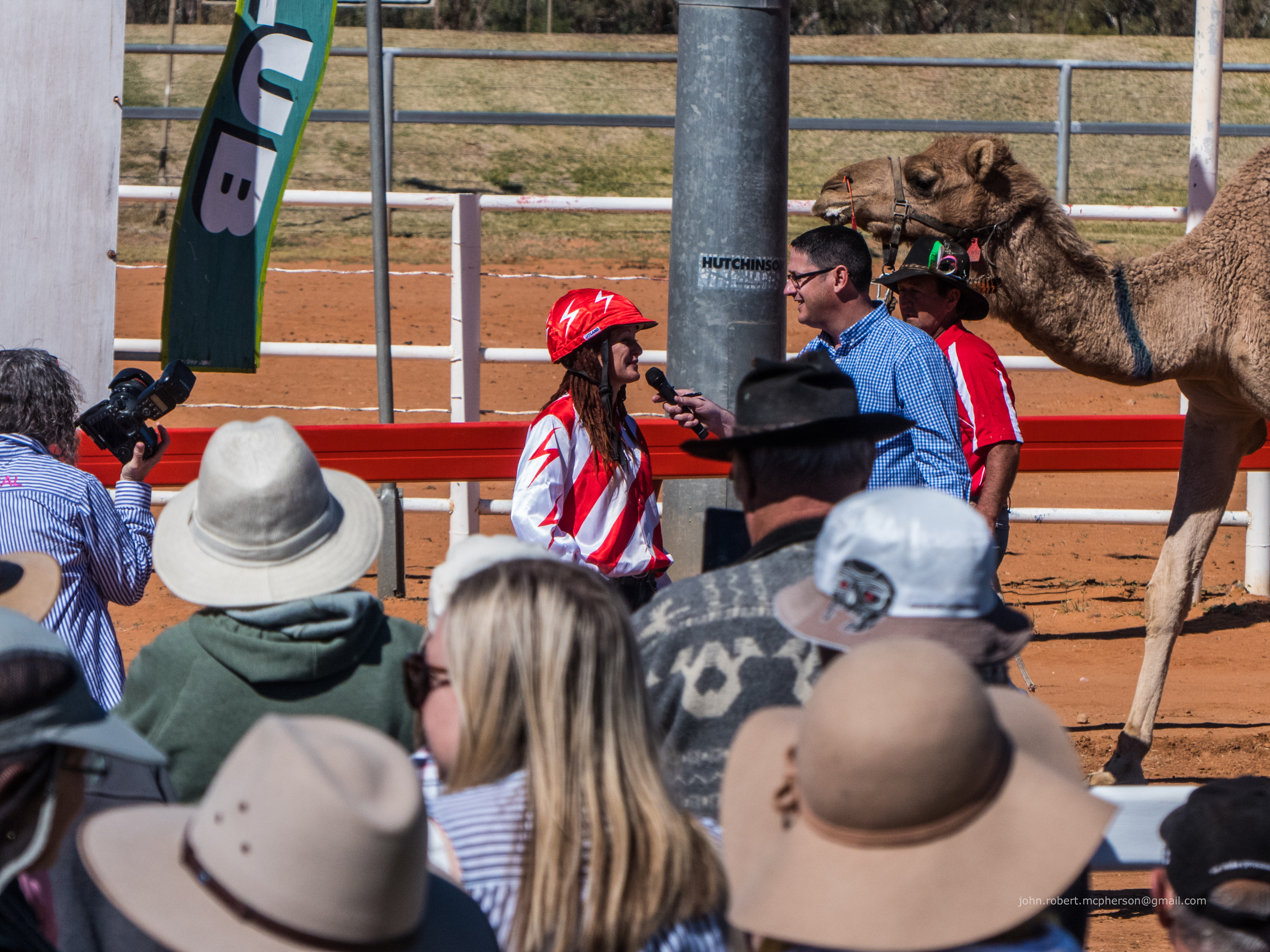
Boulia Camel Races, Boulia Turf Club, July 2018.

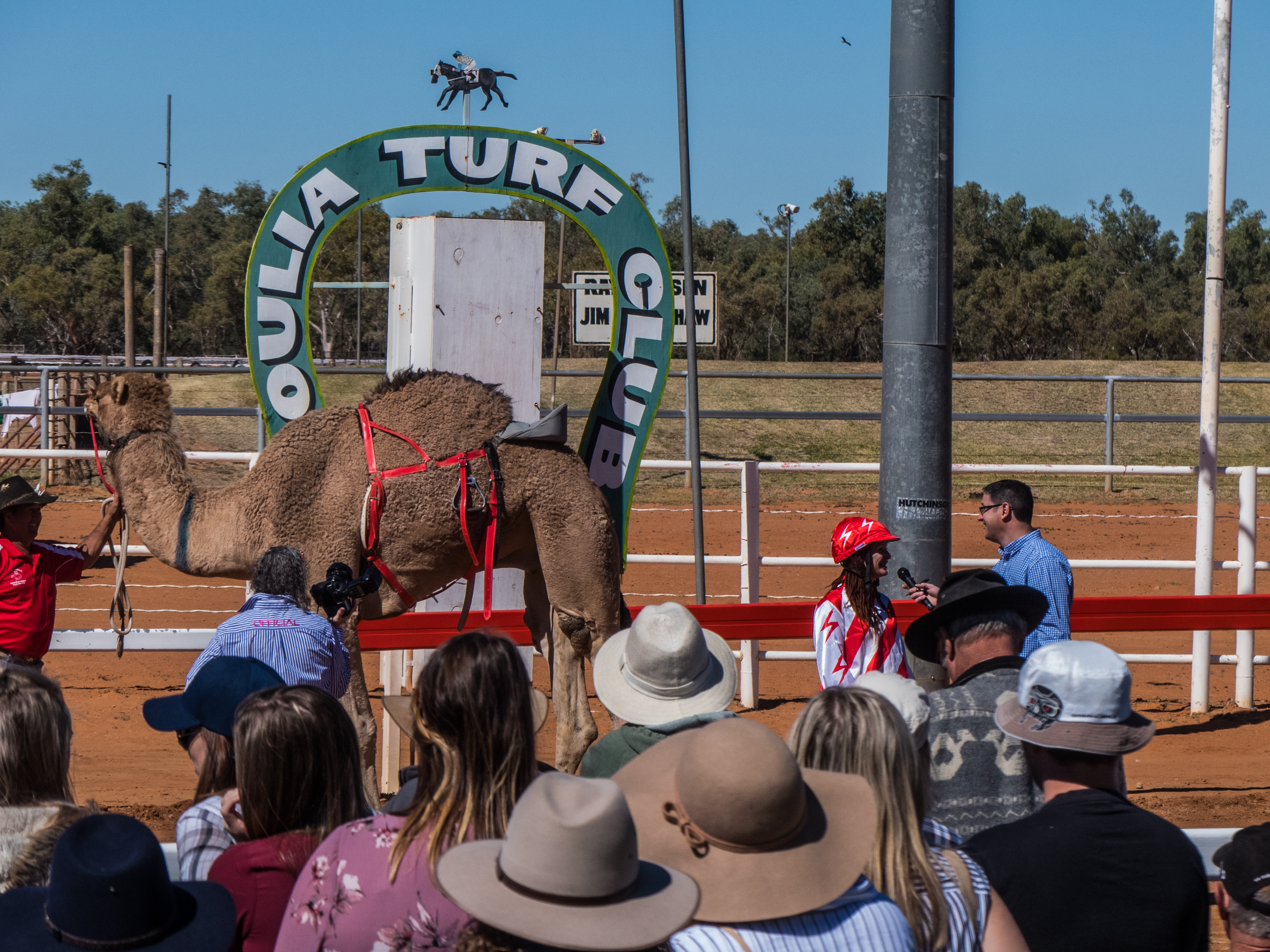
Boulia Camel Races, Boulia Turf Club, July 2018.

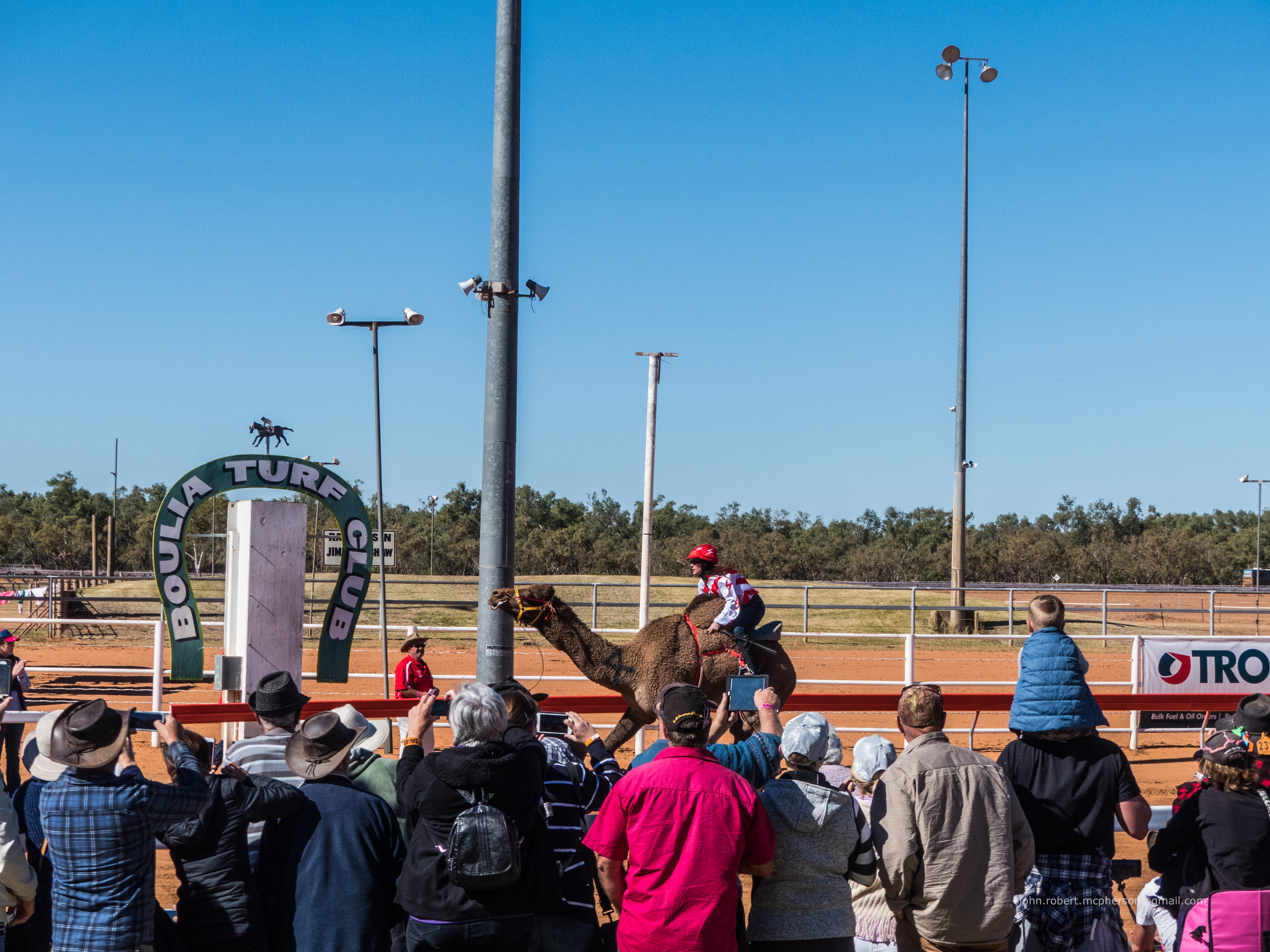
Boulia Camel Races, Boulia Turf Club, July 2018.

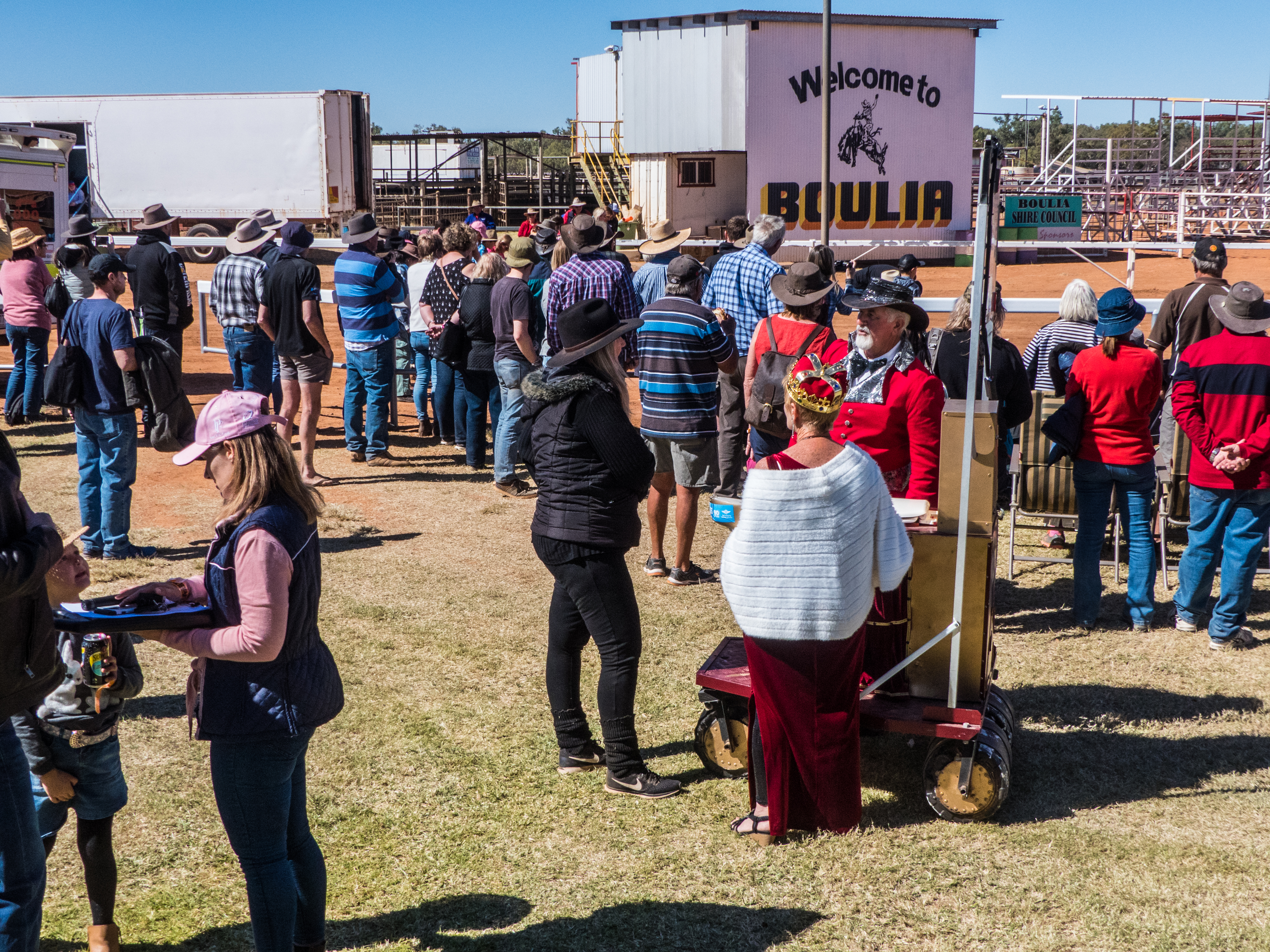
Boulia Camel Races, Boulia Turf Club, July 2018.

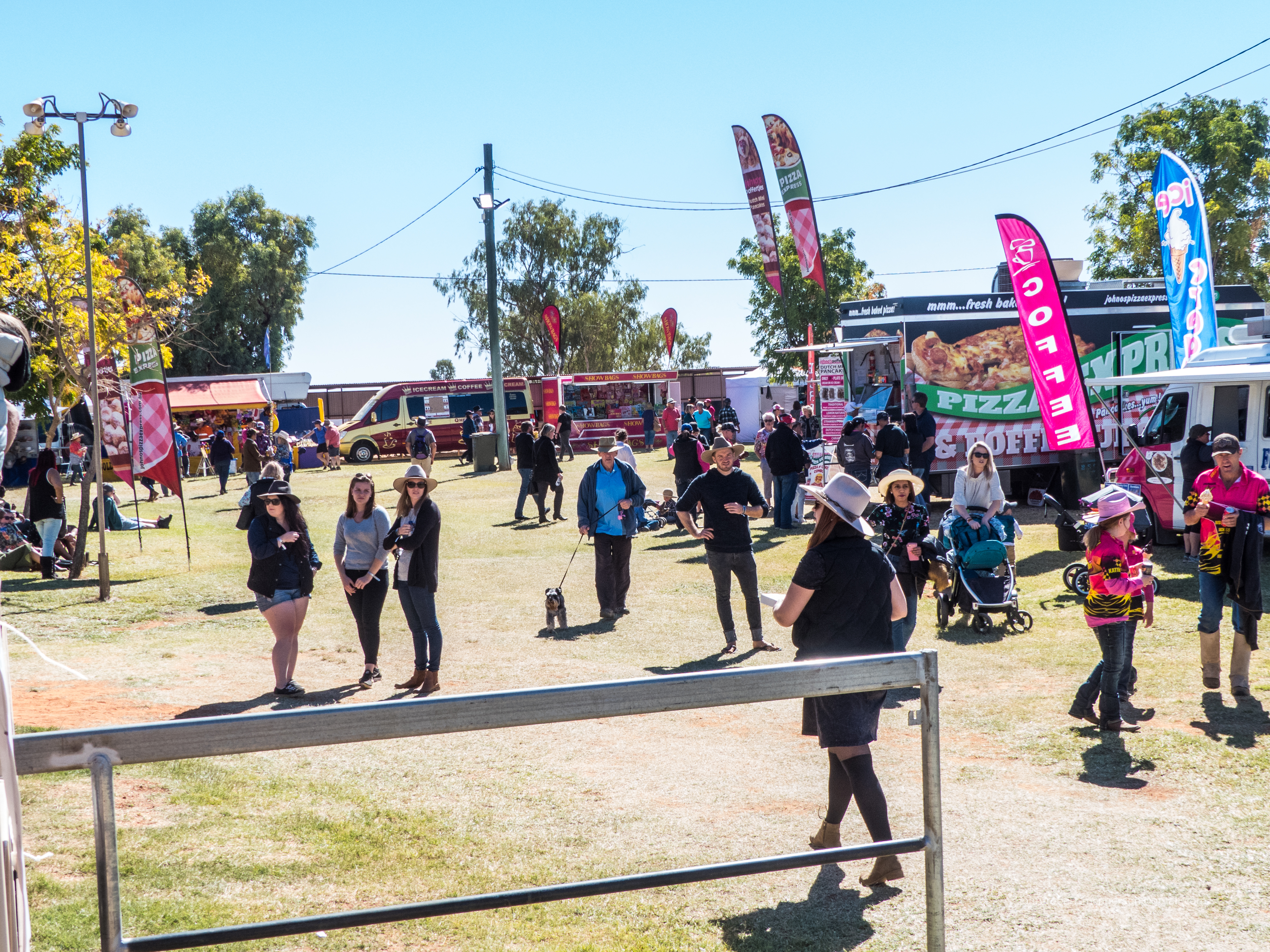
Boulia Camel Races, Boulia Turf Club, July 2018.

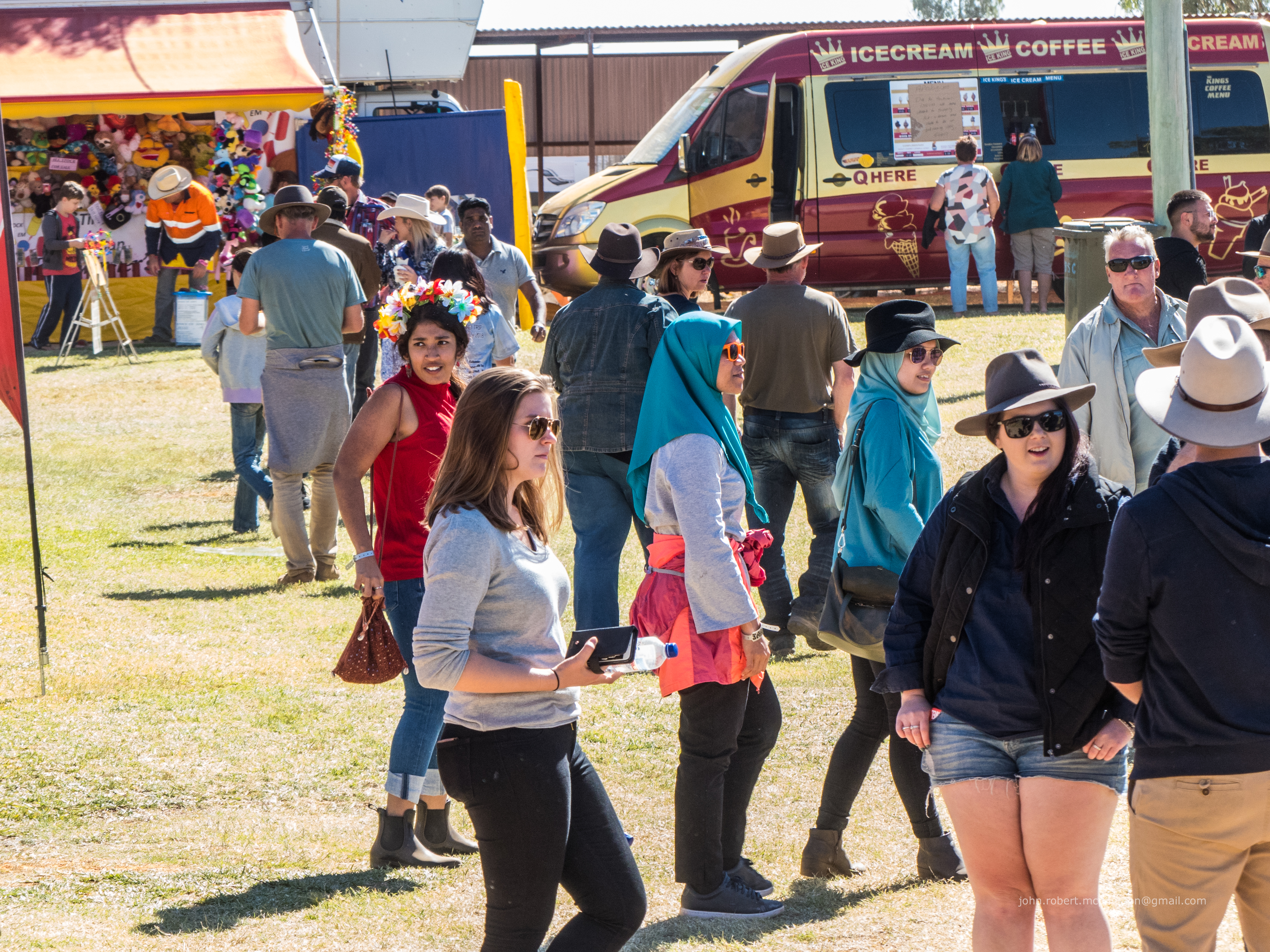
Boulia Camel Races, Boulia Turf Club, July 2018.
