= Traditional sports in the United Arab Emirates =

Traditional sports in the United Arab Emirates describes sports that are practiced traditionally by the Emirati population in the area that constitutes the United Arab Emirates. These sports include activities that were practiced mainly for survival and include falconry, underwater diving, endurance riding, camel racing, and dhow racing.

== Falconry ==
One of UAE's oldest tradition is falconry and it dates to past times. It is not known exactly when falconry emerged but some historians believe that it dates back 2000 years. Falconry was originally practiced as a source for food, to hunt hares and houbara mostly. In addition to that, it was considered a way of life for leaders of the tribe and the rest of the tribe; it was undertaken during daylight hours and later on it was the topic of discussion at evening get-togethers. Furthermore, there was another companion that went hand in hand with falcons, which was the saluki hunting dog. These were mainly for hunting down gazelles.

To protect this traditional sport and also to make sure that falcons were treated properly, a number of laws were laid down. The idea of placing trackers under each falcon's skin with a unique identification numbers was established by the Emirates Bird Society.

Today, falconry is an endangered branch of Dubai's rich cultural legacy. Rapid urbanization in the UAE over the last few years has adversely affected the natural habitat of the falcons. Moreover, new falconers do not respect the codes of practicing this sport and also indulge in over-hunting. This has posed a threat to these beautiful birds as well as to the cultural offshoot of the game itself.

In order to preserve this sport for posterity's sake, the UAE government is working in collaboration with UNESCO for imbuing falconry with the status of a cultural heritage across the globe and attracting more Dubai holiday makers for this reason. Unesco has taken the task to revive and promote the Traditional Sports and Games by creating the Ad-hoc Advisory Committee(AAC) and elected its Chairman Mr. Khalil Ahmed Khan an expert of TSG, who is also the President of the International Association of Traditional Wrestling Sports (IATWS) and Shammi Rana as Rapporteur Ad Hoc Advisory Committee Traditional Sports & Games, UNESCO.

== Camel racing ==
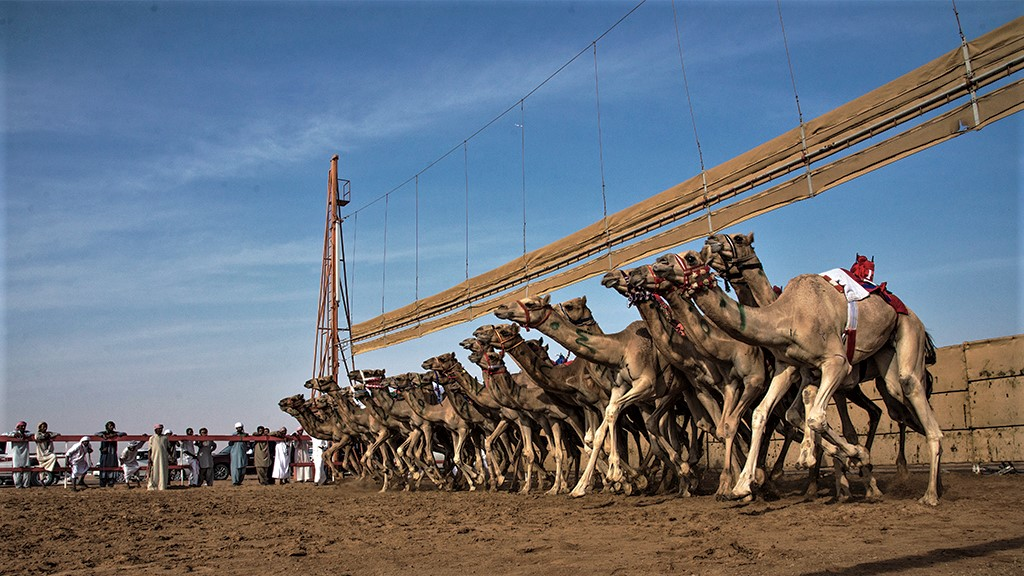
A camel race using robotic jockeys in Dubai

Thoroughbred Racing Camels are first put through their paces when they are about two years old. Initially the animals are trained to obey basic commands issued by the jockey. Then, a crucial two-kilometer gallop decides which have the ability for racing. To help build their stamina, the camels are made to run certain distances every day, which varies in proportion to their age. Recently jockeys were banned from racing and instead robots were used it their place according to human right laws.

There are two main breeds being raced, the Omani and Sudania which differ in color - the Omani being very light and the Sudania more of a tan color. Traditionally, a racing camel was fed on dates, honey, alfalfa, milk and seeds. They were never allowed to drink the day before a race and were prevented from feeding for the 12 hours prior to a race. With this type of saddle the jockey sits behind the camel's hump.

Camel-racing, a traditional sport, is extremely popular in the Emirates. It was originally staged in an informal setting, at weddings or special festivals, but now customized tracks have been built throughout the country where race meetings are held in the winter months from October to April, culminating in the annual camel race festival at Al Wathba which attracts entrants from all over the world.Camel racing has become a highly organized and professional sport, The main venues for camel racing include the Al Marmoom Camel Racetrack and Al Lisaili Racetrack, where locals and tourists alike can witness the races.

Racing camel's top speed 40 mph (64 km/h). Can run at 18 mph (29 km/h) for one hour or 7 mph (11 km/h) for up to 18 hours. In the Gold Cup that was recently run at NAD al-Shiba, the winning camel covered the 10 kilometers in 17 minutes and seven seconds (6.21 miles, averaging 21.76 mph). Because camels' humps store fat-not water- lean, streamlined racing camels have very small, almost vestigial, humps. Compared to an ordinary, run-of-the-desert camel, a racing camel looks like an enormous over-tall greyhound. The Camel-racing is quite popular in Arab region and particularly in KSA.Camel racing in Dubai is not just a sport but a living tradition that showcases the blend of the old and the new in the UAE.
