= List of sporting events in the United Arab Emirates =

This is a list of international sporting events in the United Arab Emirates.

== Single sport events ==
Year	City	Sport	Event
1982	Dubai	Football	6th Arabian Gulf Cup
1984	Sharjah	Cricket	1984 Asia Cup
1985	Abu Dhabi	Football	1985 AFC Youth Championship
1989	Dubai	Volleyball	1989 FIVB Volleyball Boys' U19 World Championship
1990	Dubai; Sharjah	Football	1990 AFC U-16 Championship
1991	Dubai	Football	1991 Arab Cup Winners' Cup
1992	Dubai	Football	1992 AFC Youth Championship
1994	Dubai	Football	12th Arabian Gulf Cup
1995	Sharjah	Cricket	1995 Asia Cup
1996	Abu Dhabi; Al Ain; Dubai	Football	1996 AFC Asian Cup
1996	Dubai	Handball	1996 Asian Men's Junior Handball Championship
2000	Dubai; Sharjah	Cricket	2000 ACC Trophy
2001	Dubai	Basketball	2001 ABC Champions Cup
2002	Dubai	Football	2002 AFC U-17 Championship
2003	Abu Dhabi; Al Ain; Dubai; Sharjah	Football	2003 FIFA World Youth Championship
2004	Sharjah	Basketball	2004 FIBA Asia Champions Cup
2004	Dubai; Sharjah	Cricket	2004 ICC Six Nations Challenge
2005	Dubai	Weightlifting	2005 Asian Weightlifting Championships
2006	Dubai; Sharjah	Rugby union	2006 Under 19 Rugby World Championship
2007	Dubai	Football	18th Arabian Gulf Cup
2008	Abu Dhabi	Ice hockey	2008 Arab Cup
2009	Dubai	Volleyball	2009 Asian Men's Club Volleyball Championship
2009	Dubai	Beach soccer	2009 FIFA Beach Soccer World Cup
2009	Dubai	Football	2009 GCC U-17 Championship
2009	Abu Dhabi	Ice hockey	2009 IIHF Challenge Cup of Asia
2009	Dubai	Rugby sevens	2009 Rugby World Cup Sevens
2010	Abu Dhabi	Handball	2010 Asian Men's Youth Handball Championship
2011	Al Ain	Athletics	2011 Arab Athletics Championships
2011	Abu Dhabi	Judo	2011 Asian Judo Championships
2011	Dubai	Rugby union	2011 Emirates Cup of Nations
2011	Abu Dhabi	Brazilian jiu-jitsu	World Professional Jiu-Jitsu Cup 2011
2012	Dubai; Sharjah	Cricket	2012 ACC Trophy Elite
2012	Fujairah; Ras Al Khaimah	Football	2012 AFC U-19 Championship
2012	Dubai	Rugby union	2011 Emirates Cup of Nations
2012	Abu Dhabi	Ice hockey	2012 Gulf Ice Hockey Championship
2012	Abu Dhabi	Ice hockey	2012 IIHF U18 Challenge Cup of Asia
2012	Abu Dhabi	Ice hockey	2013 IIHF World Championship Division III Qualification
2013	Dubai	Karate	2013 Asian Karate Championships
2013	Dubai	Volleyball	2013 Asian Men's Volleyball Championship
2013	Abu Dhabi; Al Ain; Dubai; Fujairah; Ras Al Khaimah; Sharjah	Football	2013 FIFA U-17 World Cup
2014	Dubai	Basketball	2014 FIBA Under-17 World Championship
2014	Abu Dhabi	Ice hockey	2014 IIHF Challenge Cup of Asia
2014	Dubai	Weightlifting	2014 IPC Powerlifting World Championships
2014	Dubai; Sharjah	Cricket	2014 Under-19 Cricket World Cup
2015	Dubai	Volleyball	2015 FIVB Volleyball Men's U23 World Championship
2016	Dubai	Athletics	IPC Athletics Asia-Oceania Championship 2016
2017	Abu Dhabi; Dubai	Cricket	2017 Desert T20 Challenge
2018	Abu Dhabi; Dubai	Cricket	2018 Asia Cup
2019	Abu Dhabi; Al Ain; Dubai; Sharjah	Football	2019 AFC Asian Cup
2019	Abu Dhabi	Ice hockey	2019 IIHF World Championship Division III Qualification
2019	Abu Dhabi	Ice hockey	2019 IIHF Women's Challenge Cup of Asia
2019	Abu Dhabi	Ice hockey	2019 IIHF Women's Challenge Cup of Asia Division I
2019	Abu Dhabi; Dubai	Cricket	2019 ICC T20 World Cup Qualifier
Upcoming
Year	City	Sport	Event

== Annual sport events ==
Year	City	Sport	Event
1999–	Dubai	Rugby sevens	Dubai Sevens
2004–2012	Fujairah	Cue sports	WPA World Eight-ball Championship
2006–2009	Dubai	Beach soccer	AFC Beach Soccer Championship
2010–2011	Abu Dhabi	Football	WAFF Women's Championship
2011–	Dubai	Beach soccer	Beach Soccer Intercontinental Cup
2011–	Dubai	Rugby sevens	Dubai Women's Sevens
2014–2017	Dubai	Badminton	BWF Super Series Finals
