= Robot jockey =

Machine used to race camels

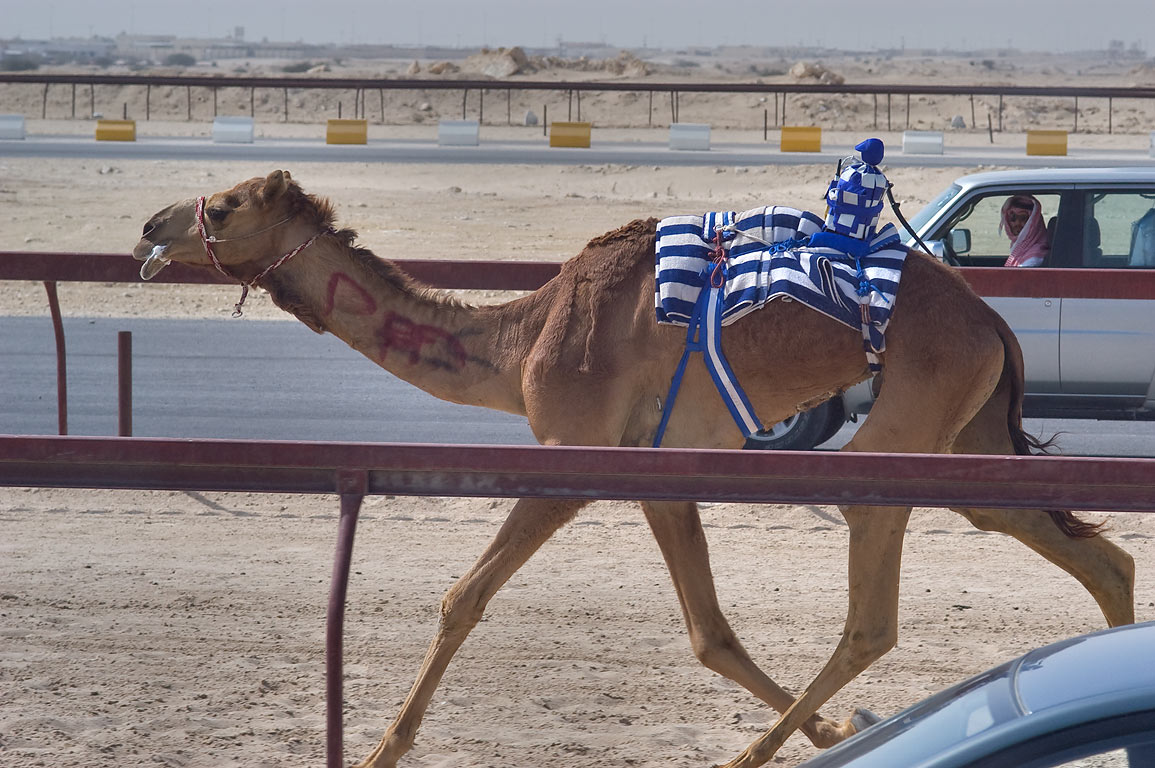
Robot jockey at Al-Shahaniya Camel Racetrack

A robot jockey is commonly used in camel racing as a replacement for human jockeys. Developed in 2004, the robotic jockeys are slowly phasing out the use of human jockeys, which in the case of camel racing in Saudi Arabia, Bahrain, United Arab Emirates, and Qatar, often employs small children who reportedly suffer repeated systemic human rights abuses. In response to international condemnation of such abuses, the nations of Qatar and the UAE have banned the use of human jockeys in favor of robots.

== Use of humans ==
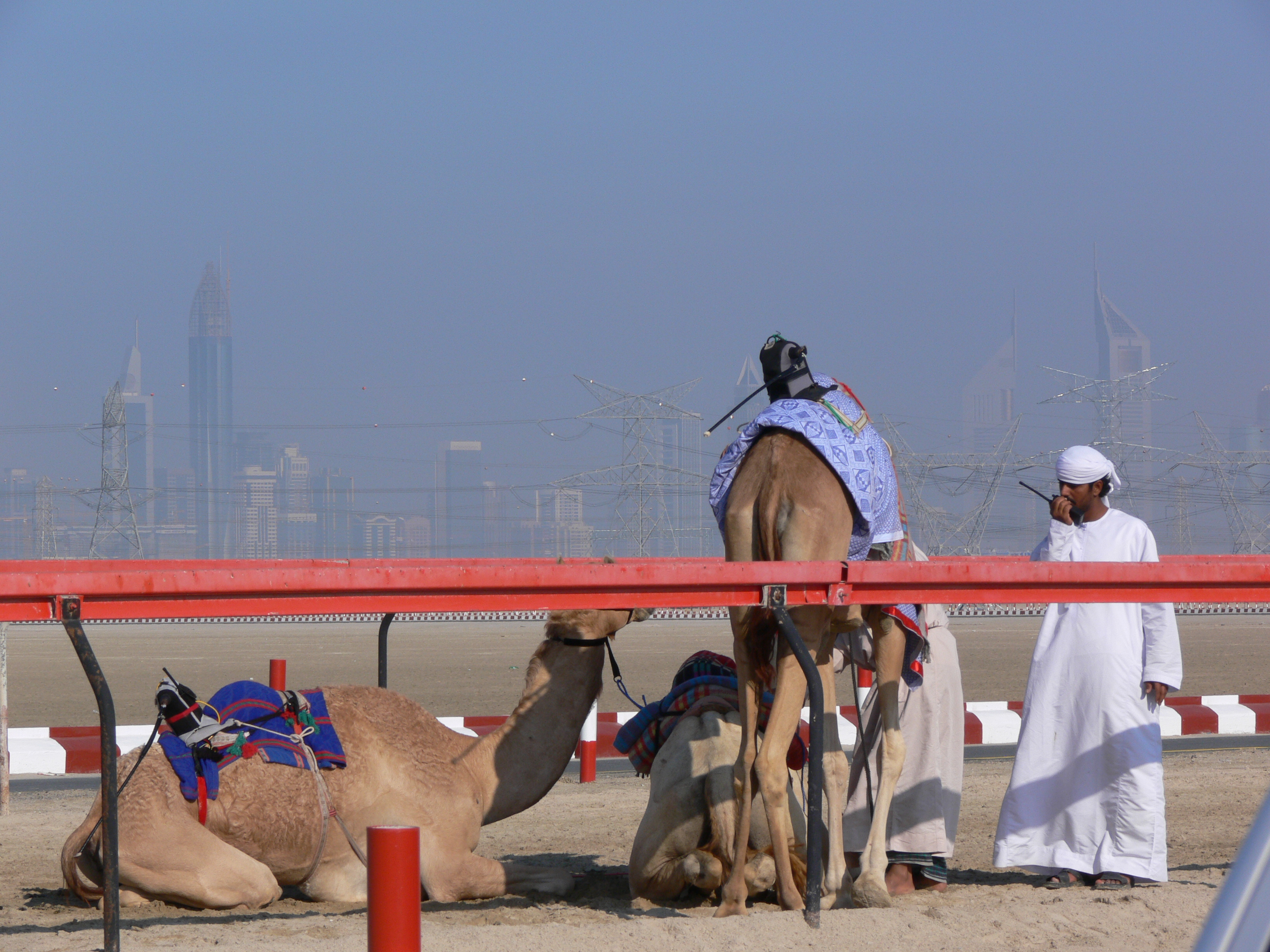
Camels mounted by robot jockeys

Camel racing has been around for thousands of years. "The Sport of Sheiks" almost exclusively used small children, usually boys around the age of four, to ride and direct the camels. Often, the boys would be starved to be as light as possible. Many of the boys used for the races were often sold to race organizers or camel owners, and there was an active child slave trade for camel jockeys, involving victims of kidnapping or the children of destitute families who sold them into servitude.

== Banning of child jockeys ==
The United Arab Emirates was the first to ban the use of children under 15 as jockeys in the popular local sport of camel racing when Sheikh Hamdan bin Zayed Al Nahyan announced the ban on July 29, 2002. While the UAE has said that it issues penalties for those found using children as jockeys, in 2010 volunteers from Anti-Slavery International photographed violations of the ban.

In Qatar, the Emir of Qatar, Sheikh Hamad Bin Khalifa Al-Thani, banned child jockeys in 2005 and directed that, by 2007, all camel races would be directed by robotic jockeys.

== Development and usage ==
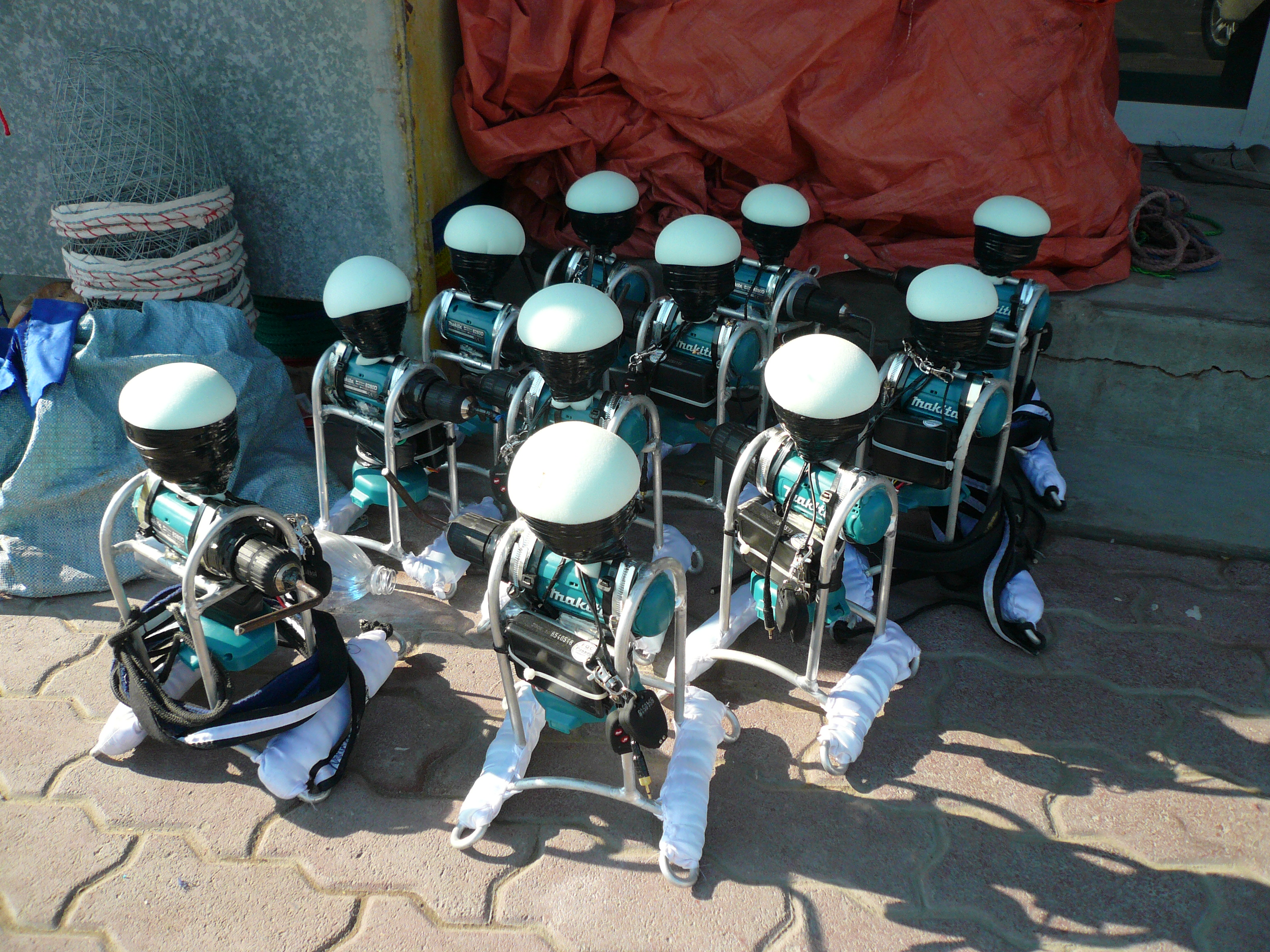
Robot jockeys powered by electric drills

The government of Qatar initiated development of the robots at the beginning of 2001. The first successful model was made in 2003 by Rashid Ali Ibrahim from the Qatar Scientific Club. At the end of 2003, the design, with a revised analysis, was tendered to Swiss robotics firm K-Team. Initial problems faced by the design team, led by Alexandre Colot, included the fact that the camels were conditioned to the use of human jockeys. Early designs confused or frightened the camels. The designs were modified to include more human-like features, including a mannequin-like face, sunglasses, hats, racing silks and even traditional perfumes used by human jockeys. Other technical issues included the conditions that the robots and the computers would be put under: the high temperatures of a dusty desert environment along with a fast-moving and uneven ride. The first successful official race featuring robotic jockeys was conducted in Qatar by 2005. The robots are aluminum-framed with a "thorax", and the circuit box was about the size of a large book and controlled the arms that control the whip and the reins. The robot can also monitor and transmit the speed and heart rate of the camel.

Due to their heavy weight (16 to 18 kg) and high cost, the Swiss product was ruled out and replaced by smaller, lighter (2 to 3 kg) and lower-priced models in Qatar and the UAE. The newer models were developed using RKE systems further enhanced with two-way radio controls and GSM mobile controls by Esan Maruff and, later, a "Voice & Hit Command Robot with Shock Sensor" following further research at the RAQBI Centre.

These robots are remote controlled by operators being driven alongside the racetrack in SUVs.

== Current usage ==
Widespread usage is initiated from Qatar and UAE and further extended to all GCC countries where the robots have been widely accepted.
