= Vladimir Burdun =

Serbian karate player and sports administrator

- Born: Vladimir Burdun; 1972 (age 53–54); Kurgan, USSR
- Education: State University of Physical Education, Sport, Youth, and Tourism
- Occupations: Sports administrator Karate player
- Known for: Founding the Emirates Ice Hockey League

Vladimir Burdun (born 1972) is a Serbian sports administrator and former karate player.

== Biography ==
Burdun was born in 1972 in Kurgan, USSR. He holds a diploma as a boxing coach from the State University of Physical Education, Sport, Youth, and Tourism.

Burdun settled in Dubai in the mid-1990s. He started various businesses, including Art Media in the United Arab Emirates (UAE), and later became known for promoting Thai boxing in the region. He is a former karate champion and officiated matches in the 2000s organized by International Federation Muaythai Amateur (IFMA). In 2005, he founded Concept Martial Arts Professionals, a combat martial arts team based in the UAE. In 2006, he coordinated the Karate Masters Cup in the UAE. He is also the founder of Dubai Martial Arts Academy and served as its president until 2017.

In November 2018, Burdun became the president of the Emirates Hockey League (EHL). Previously, he had led the Mighty Camels club in the UAE for four years, a team that was originally established by Emirates airline pilots. He was also associated with the Mighty Bears team. During his association with both teams, he emphasized understanding hockey, which began to gain traction in the Emirates in the early 2000s.

Burdun has been the founder and president of the Emirates Hockey League (EHL) since November 2018.
