= Emirates Ice Hockey League =

Ice Hockey League

- Current season, competition or edition: 2023–24 Emirates Ice Hockey League
- Sport: Ice hockey
- Founded: 2009
- No. of teams: 6
- Country: United Arab Emirates
- Continent: Asia
- Most recent champion: Dubai White Bears (3rd title)
- Most titles: Dubai Mighty Camels (5 titles)

The Emirates Hockey League (EHL) is the national ice hockey league of the United Arab Emirates. The league is governed by the International Ice Hockey Federation and founded in 2009 by the country’s Winter Sports Federation and the Emirates Olympic Committee. The Scorpions and Mighty Camels are composed of expatriate players, including Canadians, working in the U.A.E., while the other clubs consist of mostly Emirati players who form the United Arab Emirates national team.

In November 2018, Vladimir Burdun, a former karate champion who had lived in Dubai since the mid-1990s, was appointed as the new president of the League. He planned to eventually field at least one Emirates team in the international, professional Kontinental Hockey League by 2021. "The main goal of the EHL management is to improve the quality of the league and bring new exposure to the level of play and create bridges with one of the best leagues in Europe, the Kontinental Hockey League (KHL)", he said. At about the same time, Dmitry Butenko was appointed as Managing Director of EHL. A new ice arena was expected to open in Dubai, possibly before the end of 2019, with a seating capacity of 17,000, and that venue would meet all the requirements of the KHL. (Preliminary plans for a major arena in Abu Dhabi were also underway in 2018.)

In April 2018, the Dubai Mighty Camels won the fourth title of Emirates Hockey League, becoming the major winner of the competition while in 2019, the champions were the Abu Dhabi Storms.

== 2025–26 season ==
=== Current teams ===
Team	Colors	Town, City	Home rink
Abu Dhabi Shaheen Falcons		Abu Dhabi, Abu Dhabi	Zayed Sports City
Abu Dhabi Storms		Abu Dhabi, Abu Dhabi	Zayed Sports City
Al Ain Theebs		Al Ain, Abu Dhabi	Al Ain Ice Rink
Dubai Red Stars		Dubai, Dubai	Dubai Mall Ice Rink
Dubai Mighty Camels		Dubai, Dubai	Dubai Mall Ice Rink
Galaxy Warriors		Dubai, Dubai	Sports Society Rink

=== Former teams ===
Team	Colors	Home City	Home rink
Abu Dhabi Scorpions		Al Rowdah, Abu Dhabi	Zayed Sports City
Dubai White Bears		Deira, Dubai	Dubai Mall Ice Rink

== Annual champions ==
Year	Champion
2024–25	Abu Dhabi Shaheen Falcons
2023–24	Dubai White Bears
2022–23	Dubai White Bears
2021–22	Al Ain Theebs
2020–21	Dubai Mighty Camels
2019–20	Al Ain Theebs
2018–19	Abu Dhabi Storms
2017–18	Dubai Mighty Camels
2016–17	Dubai White Bears
2015–16	Dubai Mighty Camels
2014–15	Dubai Oilers*
2013–14	Abu Dhabi Storms
2012–13	Dubai Mighty Camels
2011–12	Dubai Mighty Camels
2010–11	Abu Dhabi Storms
2009–10	Al Ain Vipers*

*The Al Ain Vipers became the Dubai Vipers in 2013, and changed their name to the Dubai Oilers in 2014. The team changed back to Dubai Vipers for the 2016-2017 season. The team later merged with the Dubai White Bears in 2018.

Team	Titles
Dubai Mighty Camels	5
Dubai White Bears/Vipers	5
Abu Dhabi Storms	3
Al Ain Theebs	2
Abu Dhabi Shaheen Falcons	1
