= Camel racing =

Popular sport in parts of Africa, Asia and Australia

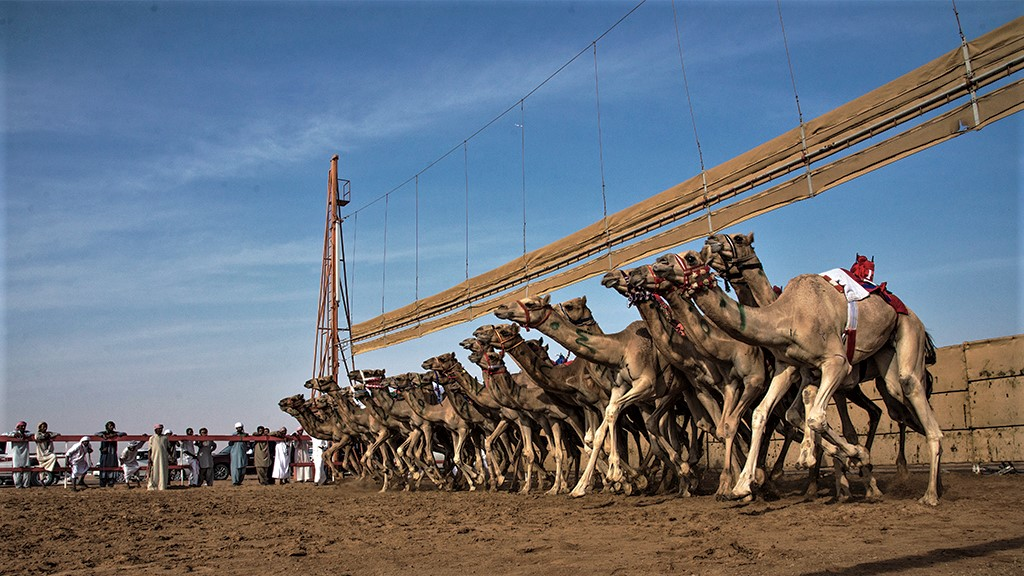
A camel race using robotic jockeys in Dubai

Camel racing is a form of racing in which jockeys riding on camels compete against each other to finish a set number of laps around a circular racetrack. It is most popular in the Middle East, the Horn of Africa, Pakistan, Mongolia and Australia. Professional camel racing, like horse racing, is an event for betting and tourism. Camels can run at speeds up to 65 km/h (18 m/s; 40 mph) in short sprints and they can maintain a speed of 40 km/h (11 m/s; 25 mph) for an hour. Camels are often controlled by child jockeys, but allegations of human rights abuses have led to nationwide bans on underage labor in the UAE and Qatar. In modern camel racing, camels are often controlled by remote controlled robotic whips.

== History ==
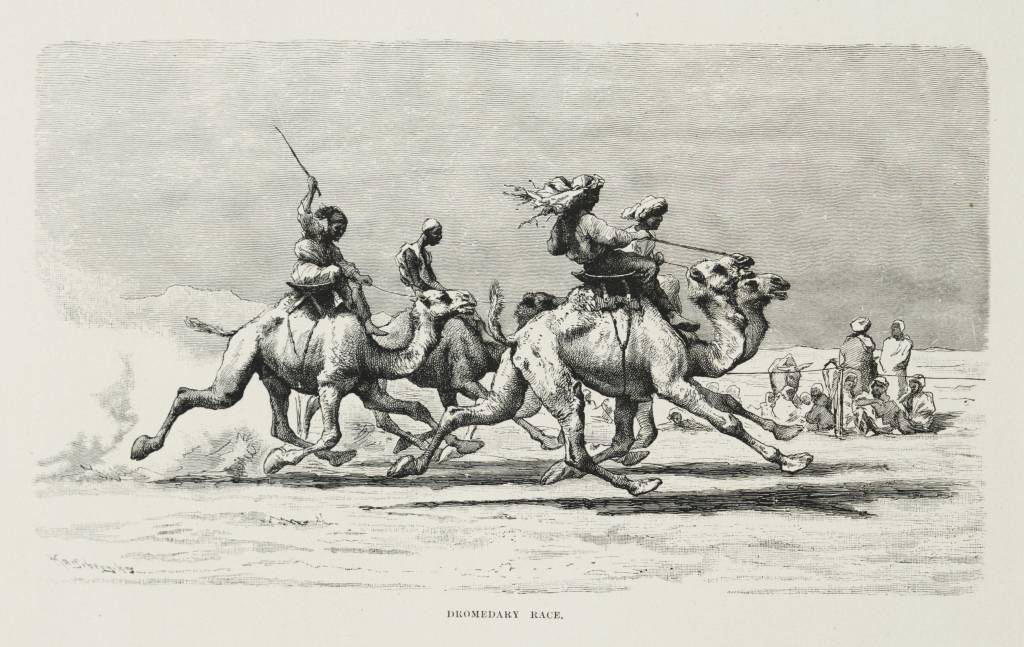
Camel racing in Egypt

Camel racing is a centuries-old racing event, which has been practiced as a traditional Middle Eastern sport since Medieval times. It can be at least traced back to the 7th century CE Arabian Peninsula where it was a folk sport practiced at social gatherings and festivals. Camels have held an important position in Middle Eastern societies as modes of transportation beyond racing for thousands of years, only recently replaced by automobiles in the mid-20th century during the oil boom in the region.

Historically, many camel races in the Persian Gulf region of the Middle East existed to serve the purpose of a social event and celebration rather than an intense competition. Bedouin communities often conducted short, 300 to 500 metres (980 to 1,640 ft) long races to commemorate special occasions such as weddings, religious festivals and feasts, and rainfall.

When competitions occurred in past eras of camel racing, the arrangements and prizes were significantly less planned ahead than they are in the races today. Participants were rarely determined more than a day in advance, and usually came as the result of a challenge between camel owners. The sport had very few rules and regulations, and foul play between riders prior to races was common. Furthermore, there were no age or weight classes for camels or riders.

== Camel racing today ==
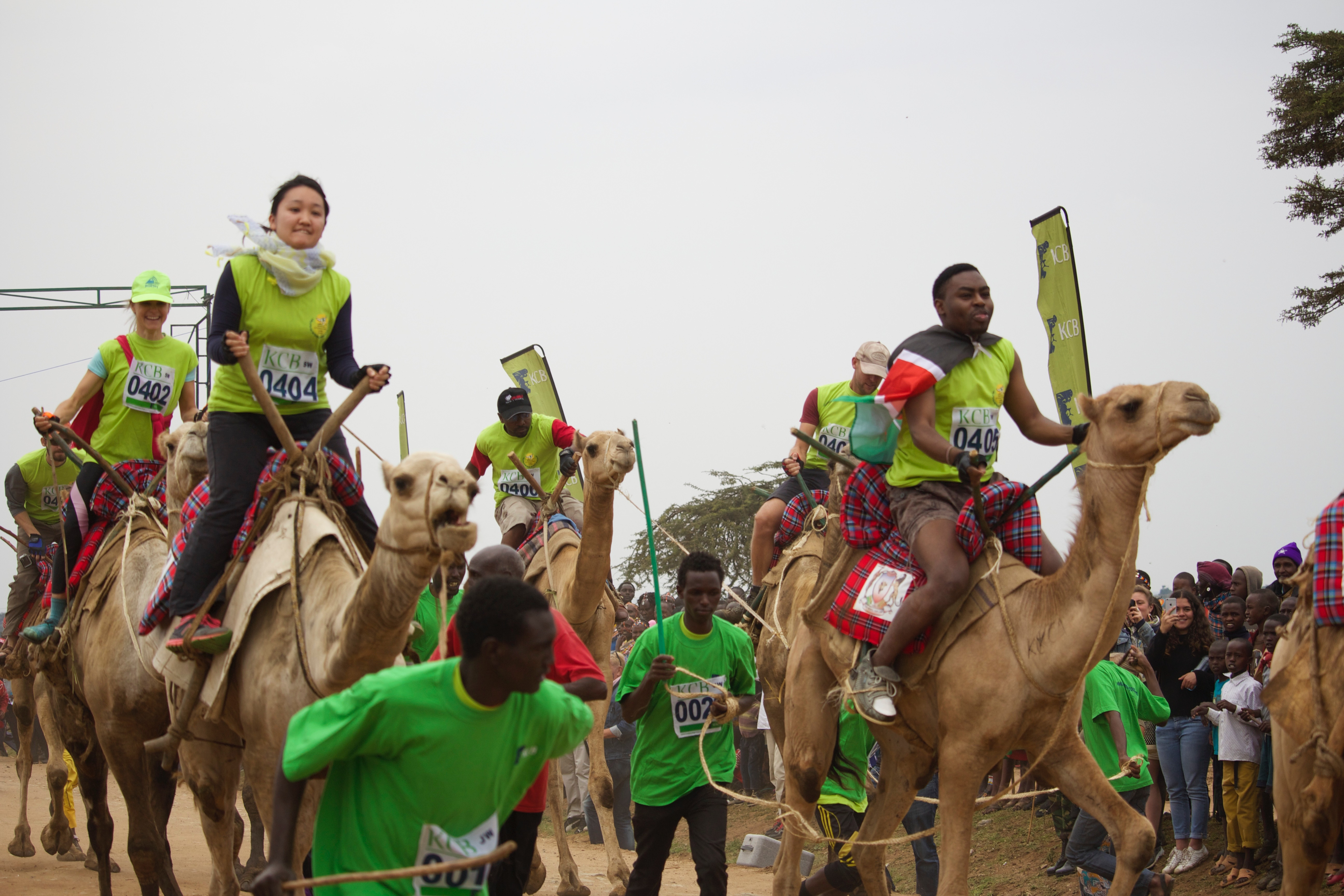
Camel racing in Maralal, Kenya

With the immense influx of money into the Arab world as a result of the oil economy emerging in the 1960s and 1970s, the societies of the region underwent massive transformation, and with it, so did camel racing. Due to increased popularity and participation in the sport, races are now split into divisions and classes of race distance as well as the age and breed of the camel to standardize competitions. Numerous tracks were also constructed primarily for camel racing in the United Arab Emirates during the 1980s, including famous tracks Al-Wathba, near Abu Dhabi, and Nad Al-Shiba near Dubai. Both tracks have a maximum spectator capacity of around 1,000 people.Both Emirati men and women participate in the traditional camel race across various categories. For Emirati jockeys which is 6km race has been divided into two categories and according to age while the 1500m race was for expat jockeys.

== Major events and prizes ==
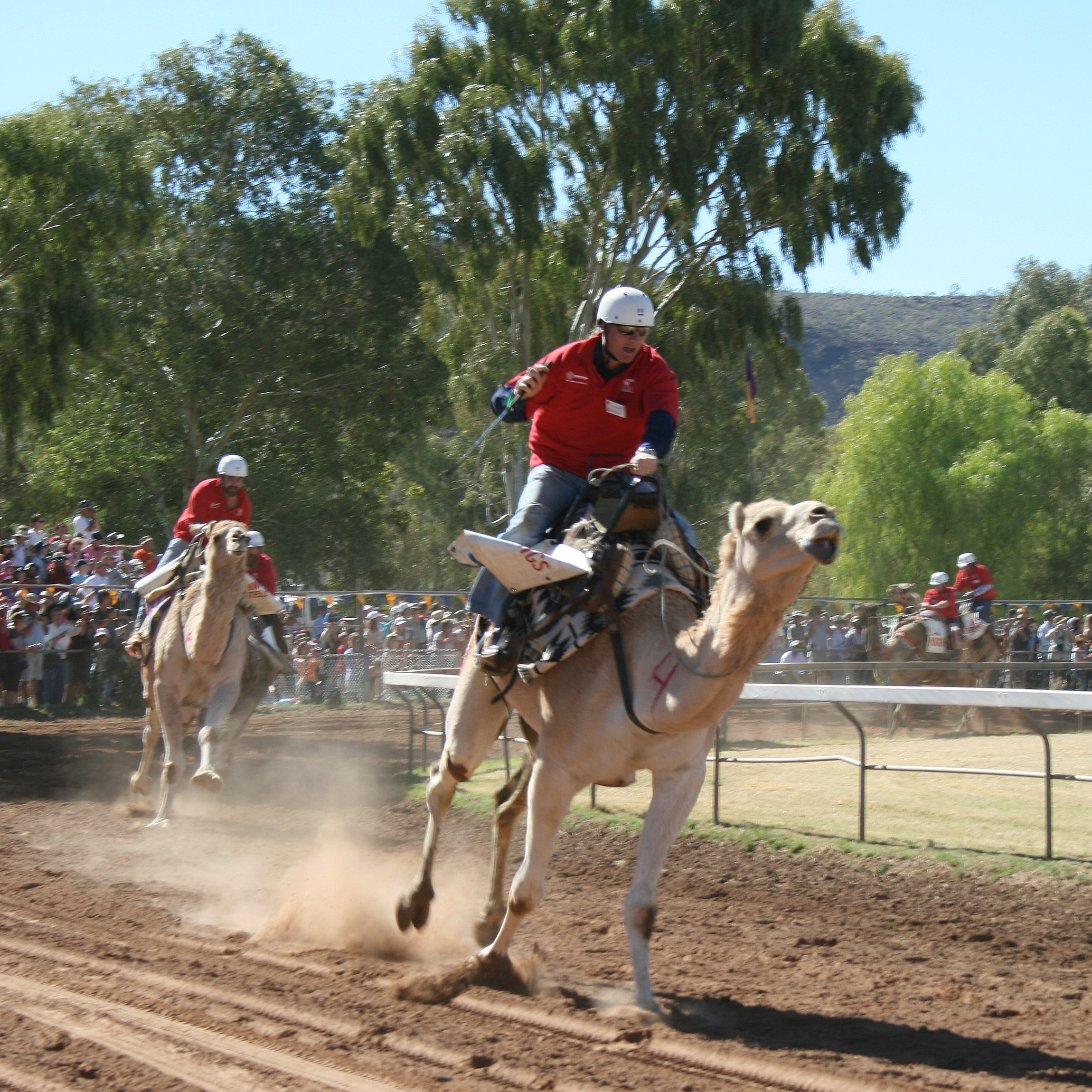
Camel racing during the 2009 Camel Cup held in Alice Springs

A major camel race is the Camel Cup held in Alice Springs which is the second biggest prize purse camel race in Australia. It is held annually and includes not only the camel races themselves, but also a collection of market stalls and other entertainment. The biggest prize money camel race in Australia is The Boulia Desert Sands with a A$500,000 prize purse in Queensland.

== Child jockeys ==
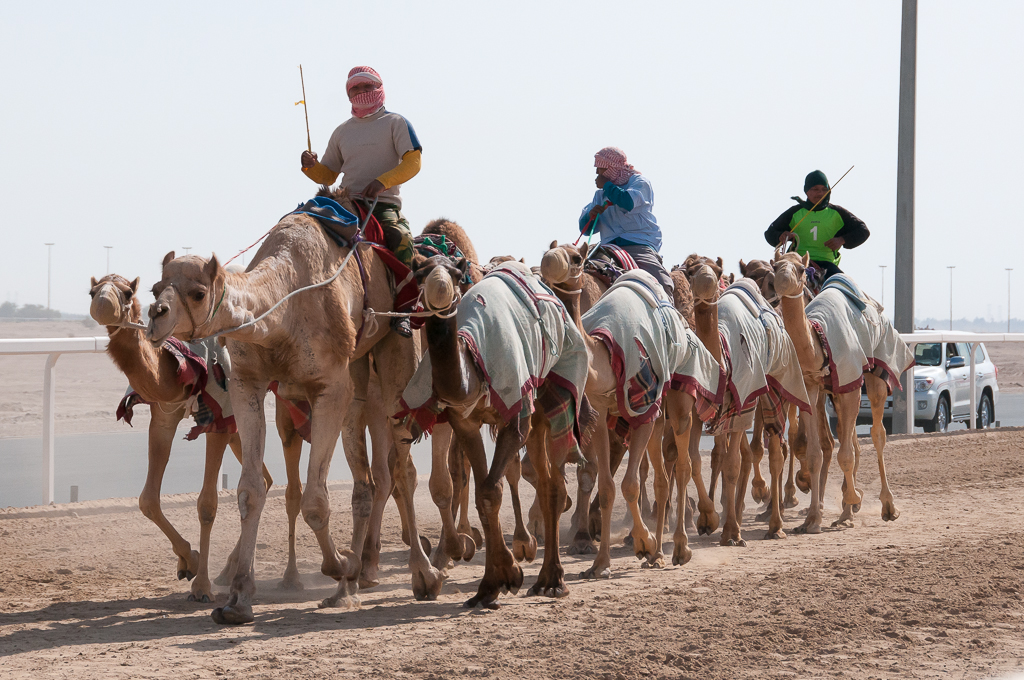
Al-Shahaniya, Qatar's largest camel racing track

Children are often favored as jockeys because of their light weight, and in order to maximize the camels' speed, they often will fast for days at a time prior to each race. It has been reported that thousands of children are trafficked usually from countries such as Afghanistan, Bangladesh, Iran, Pakistan, and Sudan for use as jockeys in the Arab states of the Persian Gulf. In 2005, aid workers estimated a range of 5,000–40,000 child camel jockeys in the Persian Gulf region.

Many child camel jockeys suffer serious injuries when falling off camels. The child jockeys live in camps (called "ousbah") near the racetracks and many are victims of abuse. Hundreds of children have been rescued from camel farms in Oman, Qatar, and the UAE and taken back to their original homes or kept in shelter homes. Many however, are unable to identify their parents or home communities. Some countries have issued penalties for those who trafficked child camel jockeys and ordered the owners responsibility for returning the children back to their home countries. However, they report that in many instances the children rescued were those who had been sold away by their own parents in exchange for money or a job abroad. If they were returned, the children would again be sold for the same purposes. Other children did not speak their native languages, or did not know how to live outside the camel farms.

A prominent activist for rehabilitation and recovery of the jockeys is Pakistani lawyer Ansar Burney. He has focused a portion of his work on eliminating the use of child jockeys.

=== Bans ===
The United Arab Emirates was the first to ban the use of children under 15 as jockeys in camel racing when Sheikh Hamdan bin Zayed Al Nahyan announced the ban on 29 July 2002. In 2009 the UAE paid compensation to 879 former jockeys. While the UAE has said that it issues penalties for those found using children as jockeys, in 2010 volunteers from Anti-Slavery International photographed violations of the ban. Nowadays, the UAE is the birthplace of the current robot jockeys, which are designed to ride camels. The original design was a joint effort between the UAE and Switzerland.

In Qatar, the former Emir of Qatar, Hamad Al Thani, banned child jockeys in 2005 and directed that, by 2007, all camel races would be directed by robotic jockeys.

== World Federation ==
World Camelids Sports (WCS)

ICRF International - International Camel Racing Federation (ICRF) - World Camelids Sport

Camel Racing World Federetion - CRWF

== European Federation ==
European Camel Racing Federation

== Australia ==
Camel racing is held in Queensland, Australia, in the towns of Jundah, Bedourie, Boulia and Winton.

== See also ==
- Desert racing
- Camel wrestling
- The Great Australian Camel Race, an Australian event held in 1988 to recognize the positive impact that camels had on the development of Australia
