= Australian feral camel =

Feral camels in Australia

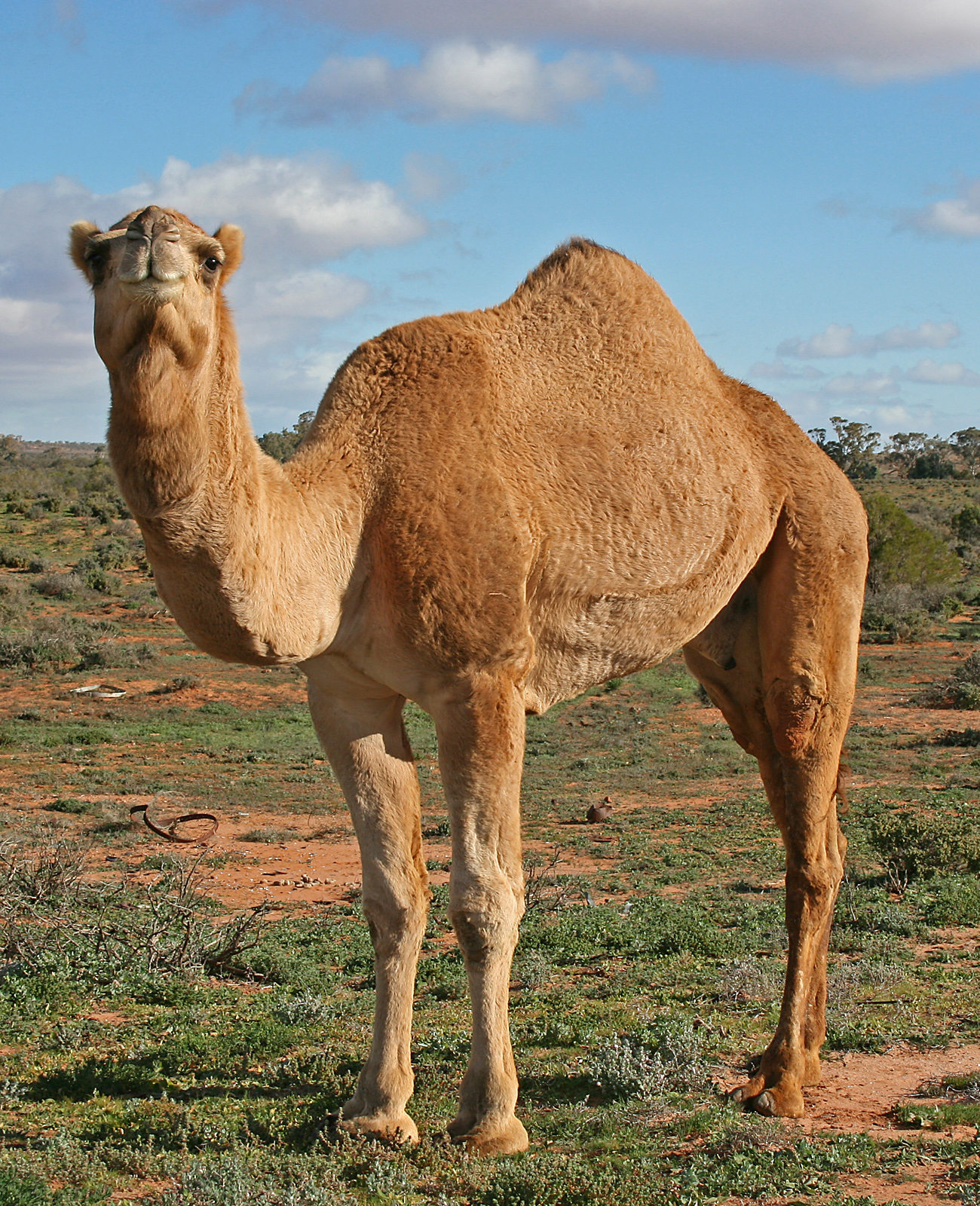
A dromedary near Silverton, New South Wales

Australian feral camels are introduced populations of dromedary, or one-humped camel (Camelus dromedarius—from the Middle East, North Africa and the Indian subcontinent).

Imported to Australia as valuable beasts of burden from British India and Afghanistan during the 19th century (for transport and sustenance during the exploration and colonisation of the Red Centre), many were casually released into the wild after motorised transport negated the use of camels in the early 20th century. This resulted in a fast-growing feral population with numerous ecological, agricultural, and social consequences. Australia has the largest population of feral camels, which is notable for being disease-free and the only herd of dromedary camels exhibiting wild behaviours in the world.

In 2008, the number of feral camels was estimated to be more than one million, with the capability of doubling in number every 8 to 10 years. An AU$19 million culling program was funded in 2009, and by 2013 a total of 160,000 camels were slaughtered, estimating the feral population to have been reduced to around 300,000, with an annual growth of 10% per year. A post-kill analysis projected the original count to be around 600,000.

== Consequences ==
=== Effects on the environment ===
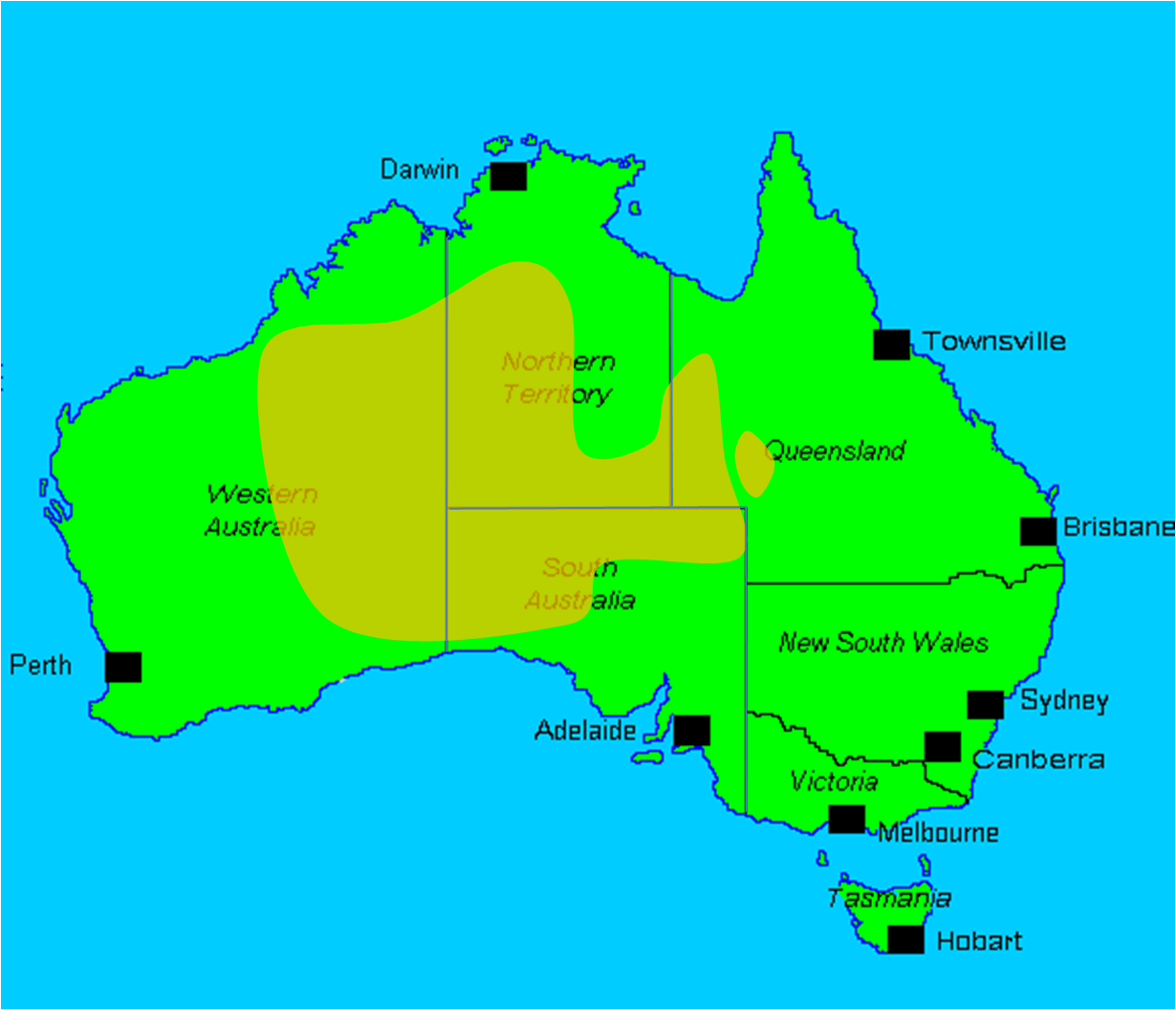
Spread of camels in Australia, shown in yellow

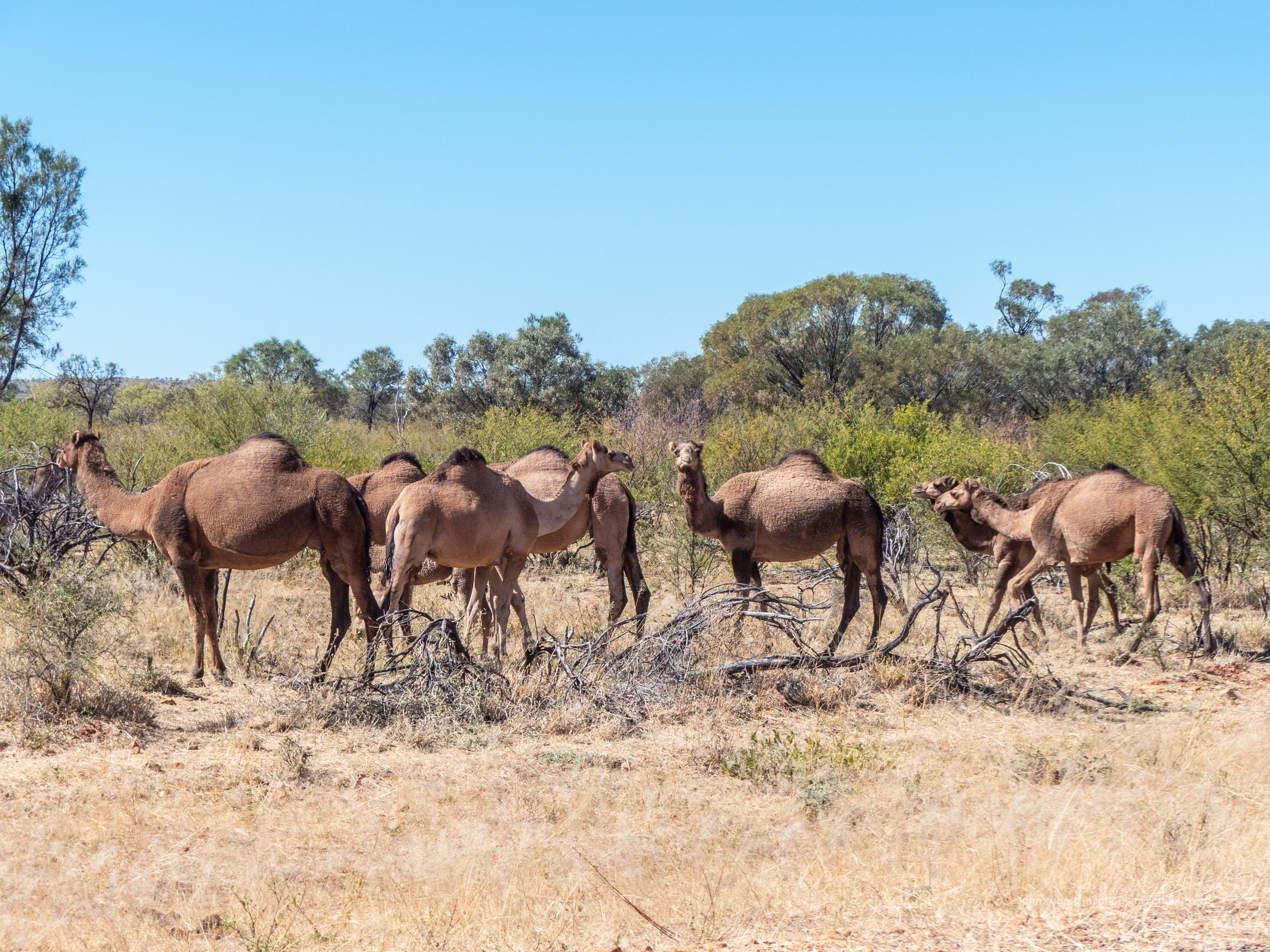
Feral camels in Shire of Boulia, Queensland

Camels are known to cause serious degradation of local environmental and cultural sites and native vegetations, particularly during dry conditions. They directly compete with endemic animals, such as kangaroos and other marsupials for food sources and shelters; camels may further thrive as they are able to digest many unpalatable (to other mammals) species of plants. Camels are known for their abilities to survive without water, however, when a source of hydration is available, even a small herd can consume much of the available water, and soil the water in the process (making it unsafe for drinking by other animals, and creating a pathogen-fostering environment).

Although their effects on the environment are not as severe as some other introduced species, camels ingest more than 80% of the plant species available. Degradation of the environment occurs when densities exceed two animals per square kilometre, which is presently the case throughout much of their range in the Northern Territory where they are confined to two main regions: the Simpson Desert and the western desert area of the Central Ranges, Great Sandy Desert and Tanami Desert. Some traditional food plants harvested by Aboriginal people in these areas are seriously affected by camel-browsing. While having soft-padded feet makes soil erosion less likely, they destabilise dune crests, which can contribute to erosion. Camels also have a noticeable effect on salt lake ecosystems, and have been found to foul waterholes.

Australian feral population is (one of) the last wild herds of the dromedary, and some researchers think the camels (and other introduced animals) may actually benefit their ecosystem in various ways. They may fill lost ecological niches of extinct Australian megafauna, such as Diprotodon and Palorchestes, a theory similar to the concepts of Pleistocene rewilding, and contribute to a decline in wildfires. Additionally, camels can be an effective counter against introduced weeds.

=== Economic and social consequences ===
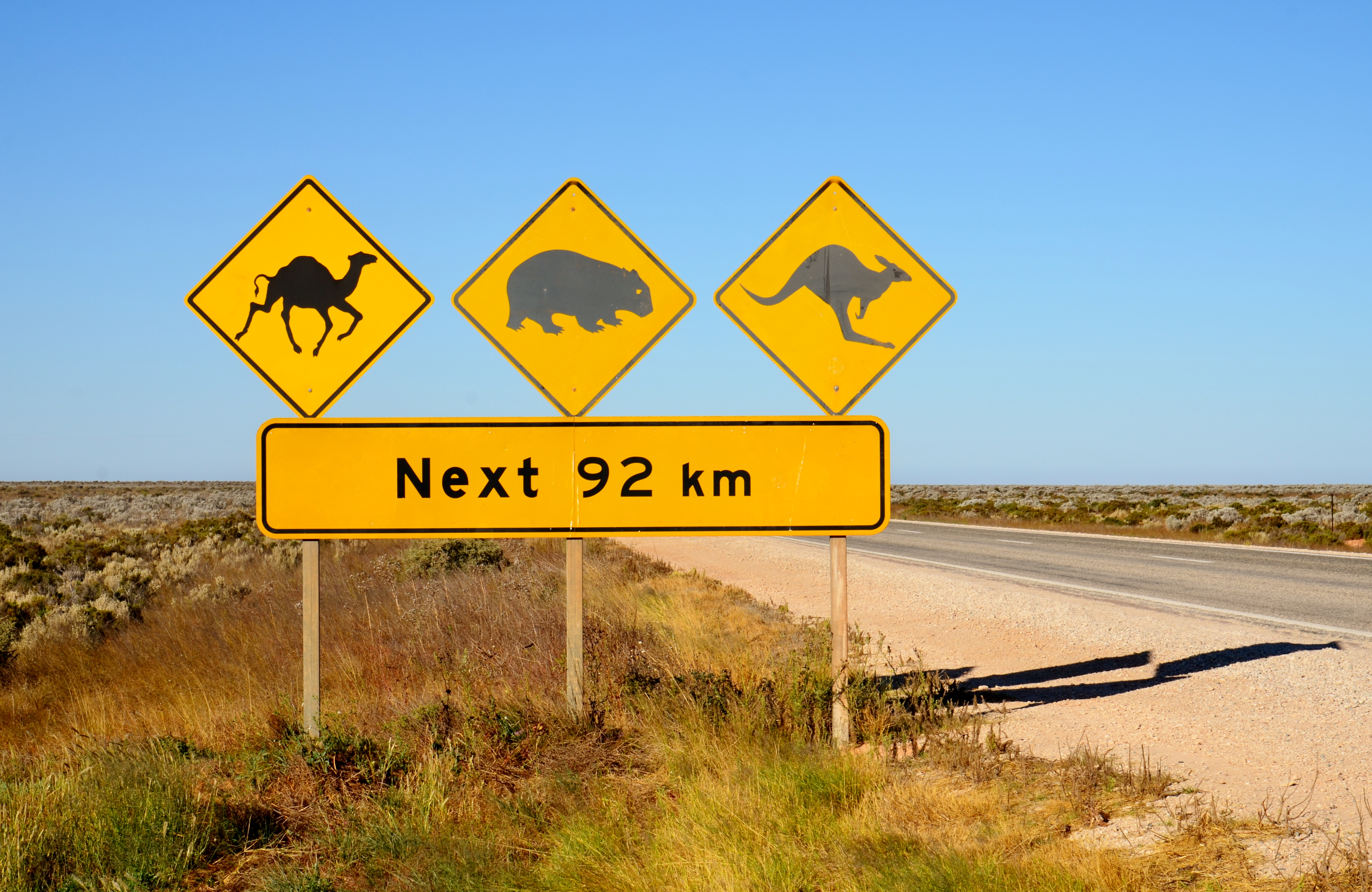
Animal warning road signs on the Eyre Highway at Nullarbor

Feral camels can cause damage to sites of cultural significance to Aboriginal people, such as burial sites, ceremonial grounds, and water places. Damage to seasonal food sources, outstations and infrastructure, and native biomes causes further disruption to communities. Direct camel control and management costs, restoration of damaged infrastructure, and agricultural and livestock disruption can be financial burdens.

Australian feral camels can be aggressive when they encounter herds of domestic livestocks, and can also be dangerously territorial towards people particularly in the mating season, having sensitive females with newly born calves, and rutting males. Pastoralists, representatives from the Central Land Council, and Aboriginal landholders in the affected areas were among the earliest complainants.

==== Infrastructure ====
Camels can do significant damage to infrastructure such as taps, pumps, and toilets, as a means to obtain water, particularly in times of severe drought. They can smell water at a distance of up to five kilometres, and are even attracted by moisture condensed by air conditioners. They also damage stock fences and cattle watering points. These consequences are felt particularly in Aboriginal and other remote communities where the costs of repairs are prohibitive.

The carcasses of camels trampled by herds while searching for water near human settlements can cause further problems.

In the summer of 2025/6, the Anangu Pitjantjatjara Yankunytjatjara (APY Lands) were plagued by feral camels in search of water, causing damage to water infrastructure in the region. Many died, with the disposal of carcasses becoming a problem for affected communities.

== History ==
Camels had been used successfully in desert exploration in other parts of the world. The first suggestion of importing camels into Australia was made in 1822 by Danish-French geographer and journalist Conrad Malte-Brun, whose Universal Geography contains the following:

For such an expedition, men of science and courage ought to be selected. They ought to be provided with all sorts of implements and stores, and with different animals, from the powers and instincts of which they may derive assistance. They should have oxen from Buenos Aires, or from the English settlements, mules from Senegal, and dromedaries from Africa or Arabia. The oxen would traverse the woods and the thickets; the mules would walk securely among rugged rocks and hilly countries; the dromedaries would cross the sandy deserts. Thus the expedition would be prepared for any kind of territory that the interior might present. Dogs also should be taken to raise game, and to discover springs of water; and it has even been proposed to take pigs, for the sake of finding out esculent roots in the soil. When no kangaroos and game are to be found the party would subsist on the flesh of their own flocks. They should be provided with a balloon for spying at a distance any serious obstacle to their progress in particular directions, and for extending the range of observations which the eye would take of such level lands as are too wide to allow any heights beyond them to come within the compass of their view.

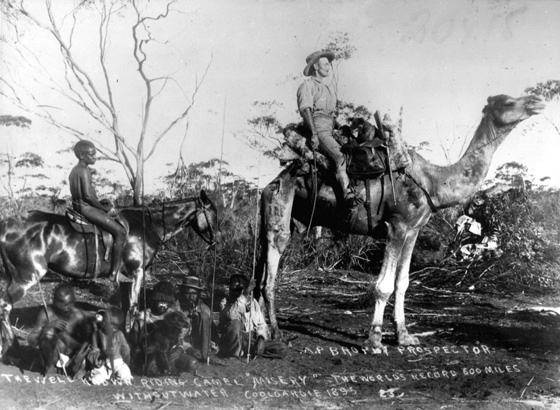
A prospector riding a camel which held a world record for distance travelled without water (600 miles), 1895

In 1839, Lieutenant-Colonel George Gawler, second Governor of South Australia, suggested that camels should be imported to work in the semi-arid regions of Australia.

The first camel arrived in Australia in 1840, ordered from the Canary Islands by the Phillips brothers of Adelaide (Henry Weston Phillips (1818–1898); George Phillips (1820–1900); G M Phillips (unknown)). The Apolline, under Captain William Deane, docked at Port Adelaide in South Australia on 12 October 1840, but all but one of the camels died on the voyage. The surviving camel was named Harry. This camel, Harry, was used for inland exploration by pastoralist and explorer John Ainsworth Horrocks on his ill-fated 1846 expedition into the arid South Australian interior near Lake Torrens, in searching for new agricultural land. He became known as the 'man who was shot by his own camel'. On 1 September Horrocks was preparing to shoot a bird on the shores of Lake Dutton. His kneeling camel moved while Horrocks was reloading his gun, causing the gun to fire and injuring the middle fingers of his right hand and a row of teeth. Horrocks died of his wounds on 23 September in Penwortham after requesting that the camel be shot.

=== "Afghan" cameleers ===
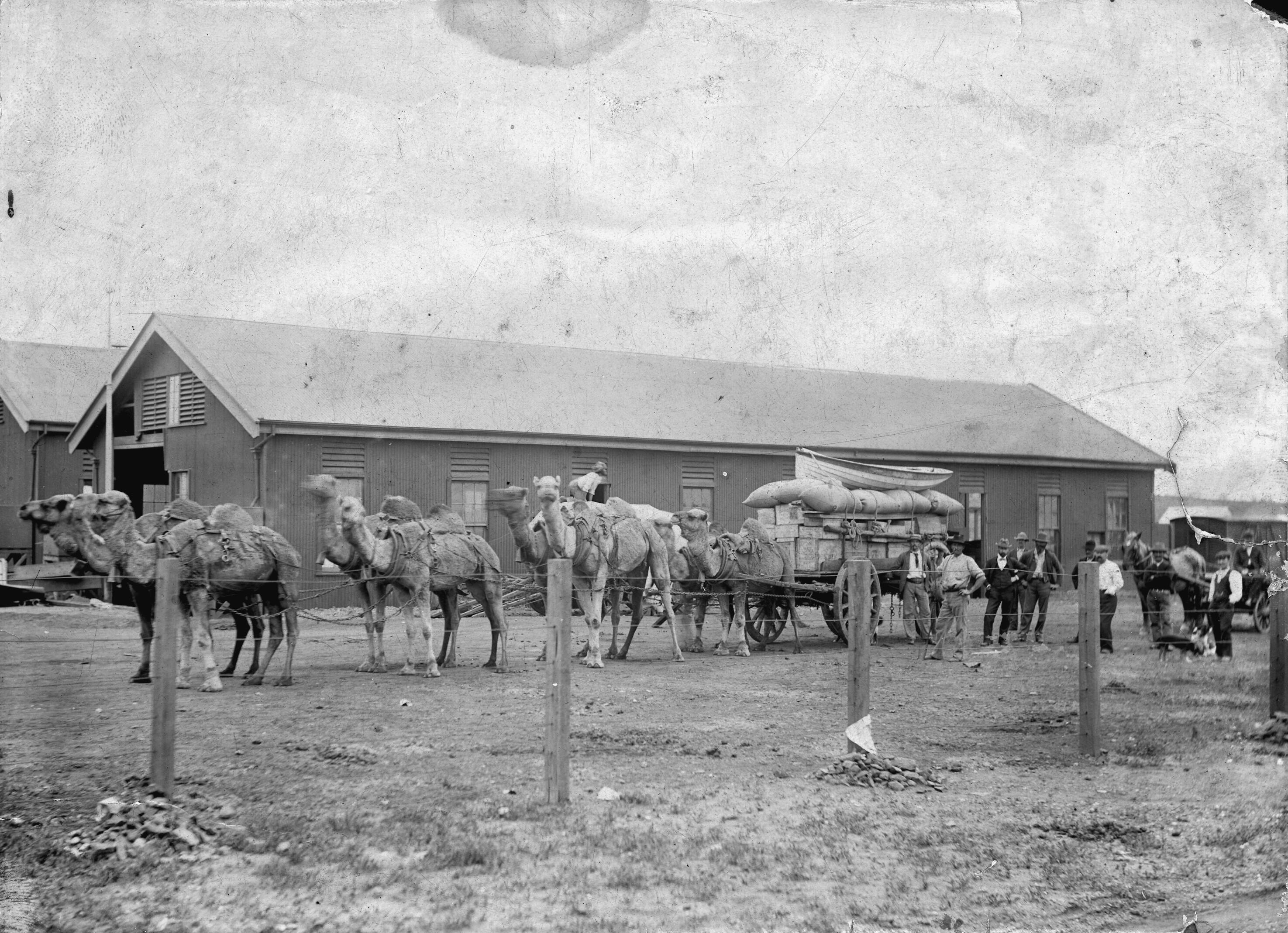
A camel train carrying a dinghy to Nannine, Western Australia, c. 1905

Australia's first major inland expedition to use camels as a main form of transport was the Burke and Wills expedition in 1860. The Victorian Government imported 24 camels for the expedition. The first cameleers arrived on 9 June 1860 at Port Melbourne from Karachi (then known as Kurrachee and then in British India) on the ship the Chinsurah, to participate in the expedition. As described by the Victorian Exploration Expedition Committee, "the camels would be comparatively useless unless accompanied by their native drivers". The cameleers on the expedition included 45-year-old Dost Mahomed, who was bitten by a bull camel, leading to the permanent loss of use of his right arm, and Esa (Hassam) Khan from Kalat, who fell ill near Swan Hill. They cared for the camels, loaded and unloaded equipment and provisions and located water on the expedition.

From the 1860s onward small groups of mainly Muslim cameleers were shipped in and out of Australia at three-year intervals, to service South Australia's inland pastoral industry. Carting goods and transporting wool bales by camel was a lucrative livelihood for them. As their knowledge of the Australian outback and economy increased, the cameleers began their own businesses, importing and running camel trains. By 1890 the camel business was dominated by the mostly Muslim merchants and brokers, commonly referred to as "Afghans" or "Ghans", despite their origin often being British India, as well as Afghanistan and Egypt and Turkey. They belonged to four main groups: Pashtuns, Baluchis, Punjabis, and Sindhis. At least 15,000 camels with their handlers are estimated to have come to Australia between 1870 and 1900. Most of these camels were dromedaries, especially from India, including the Bikaneri war camel from Rajasthan who used riding camels sourced from the Dervish wars in British Somaliland, and lowland Indian camels for heavy work. Other dromedaries included the Bishari riding camel of Somalia and Arabia. A bull camel could be expected to carry up to 600 kilograms (1,300 lb), and camel strings could cover more than 40 kilometres (25 miles) per day.

Camel studs were set up in 1866, by Sir Thomas Elder and Samuel Stuckey, at Beltana and Umberatana Stations in South Australia. There was also a government stud camel farm at Londonderry, near Coolgardie in Western Australia, established in 1894. These studs operated for about 50 years and provided high-class breeders for the Australian camel trade.

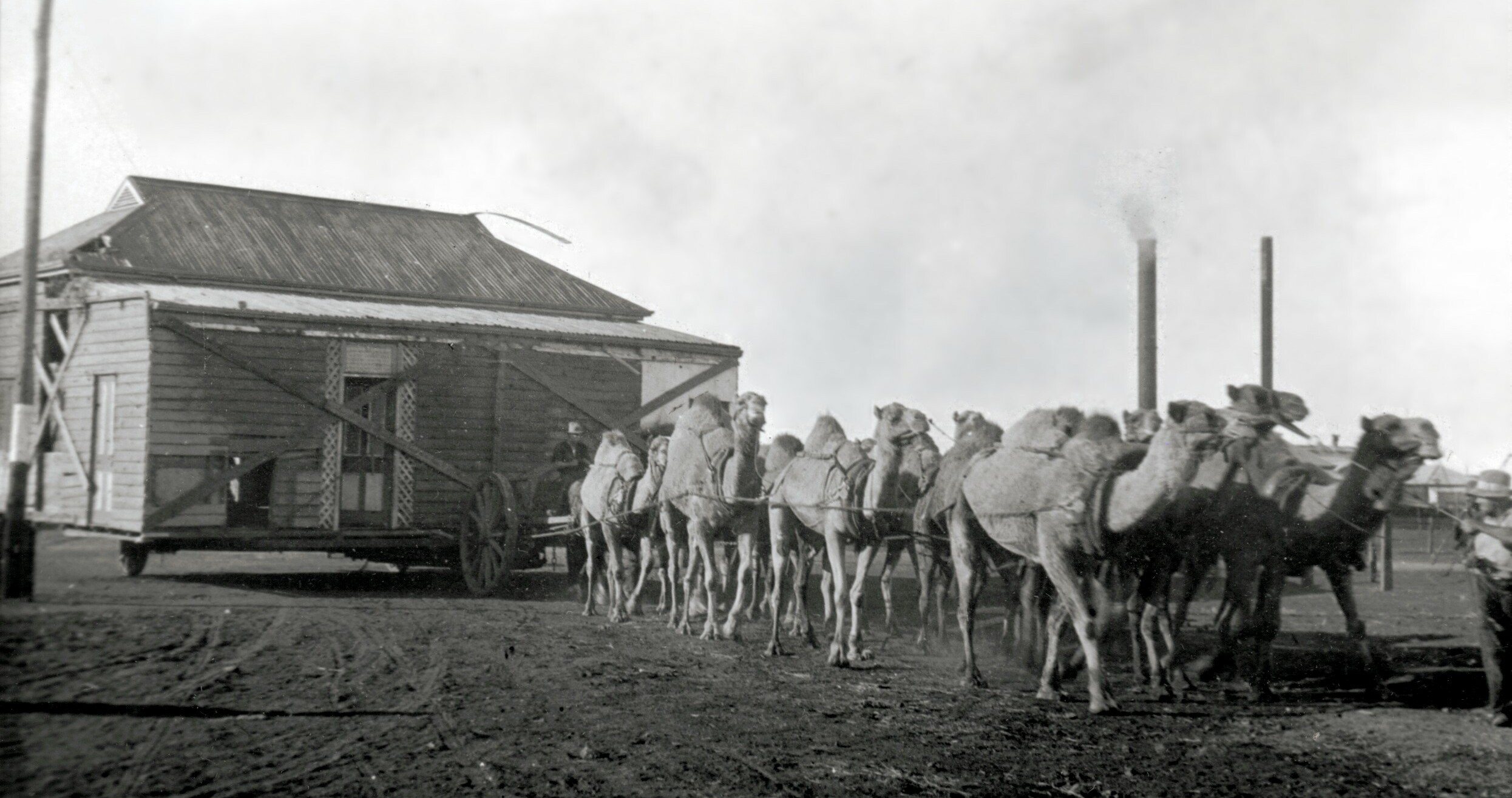
A camel train carrying a house near Kalgoorlie, Western Australia, c. 1928

Camels continued to be used for inland exploration by Peter Warburton in 1873, William Christie Gosse in 1873, Ernest Giles in 1875–76, David Lindsay in 1885–1886 and the Elder Scientific Exploring Expedition in 1891–1892, on the Calvert Expedition in 1896–97, and by Cecil Madigan in 1939. They were also used in the construction of the Overland Telegraph Line, and carried pipe sections for the Goldfields Water Supply Scheme.

The introduction of the Immigration Restriction Act 1901 and the White Australia policy made it more difficult for cameleers to enter Australia.

=== Camels go feral ===
With the departure of many cameleers in the early 20th century, and the introduction of motorised transportation in the 1920s and 1930s, some cameleers released their camels into the wild. Well suited to the arid conditions of Central Australia, these camels became the source for the large population of feral camels still existing today.

== Relationships with the people ==
=== Camels and Aboriginal people ===
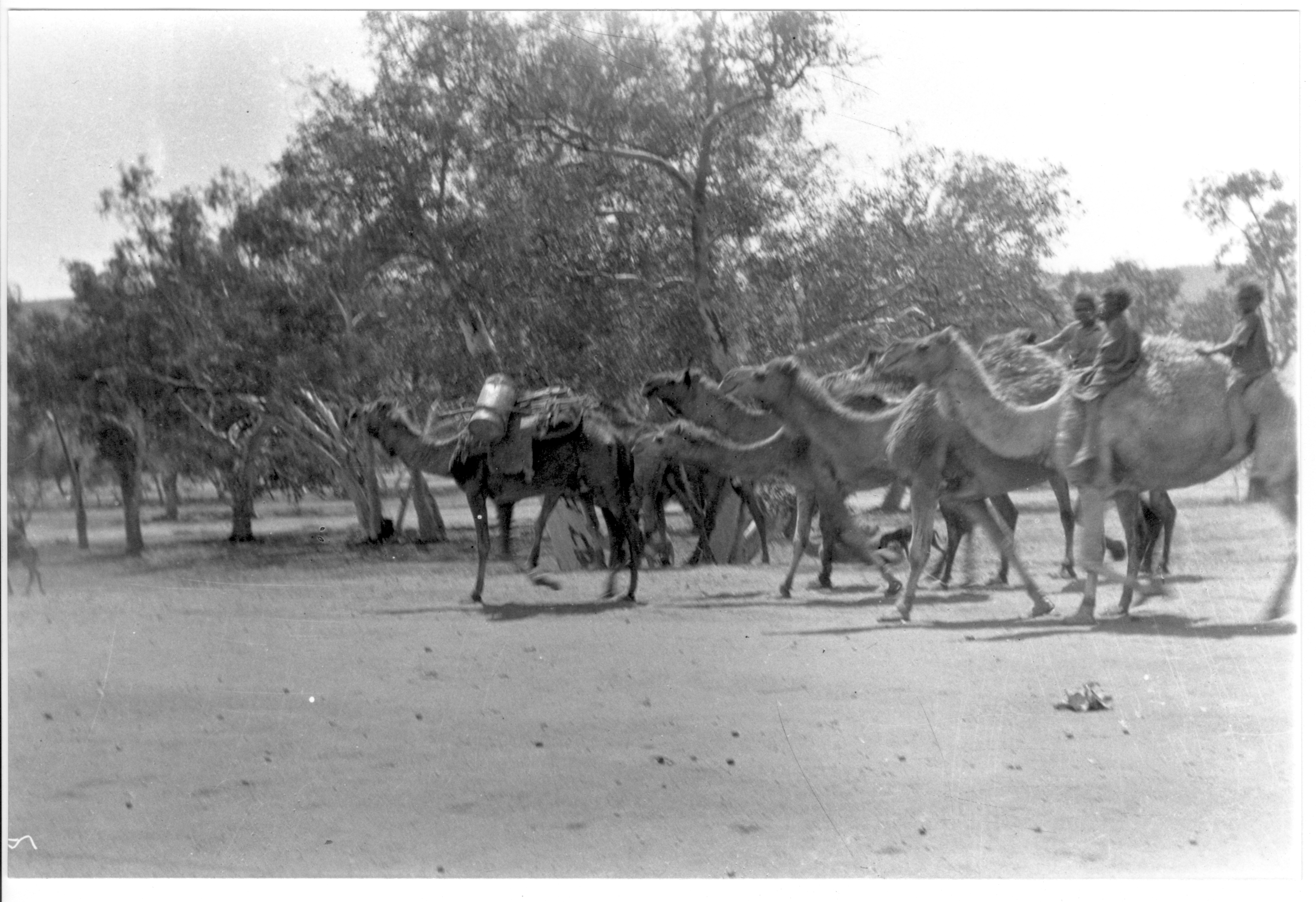
Aboriginal children riding camels, presumably at Alice Springs

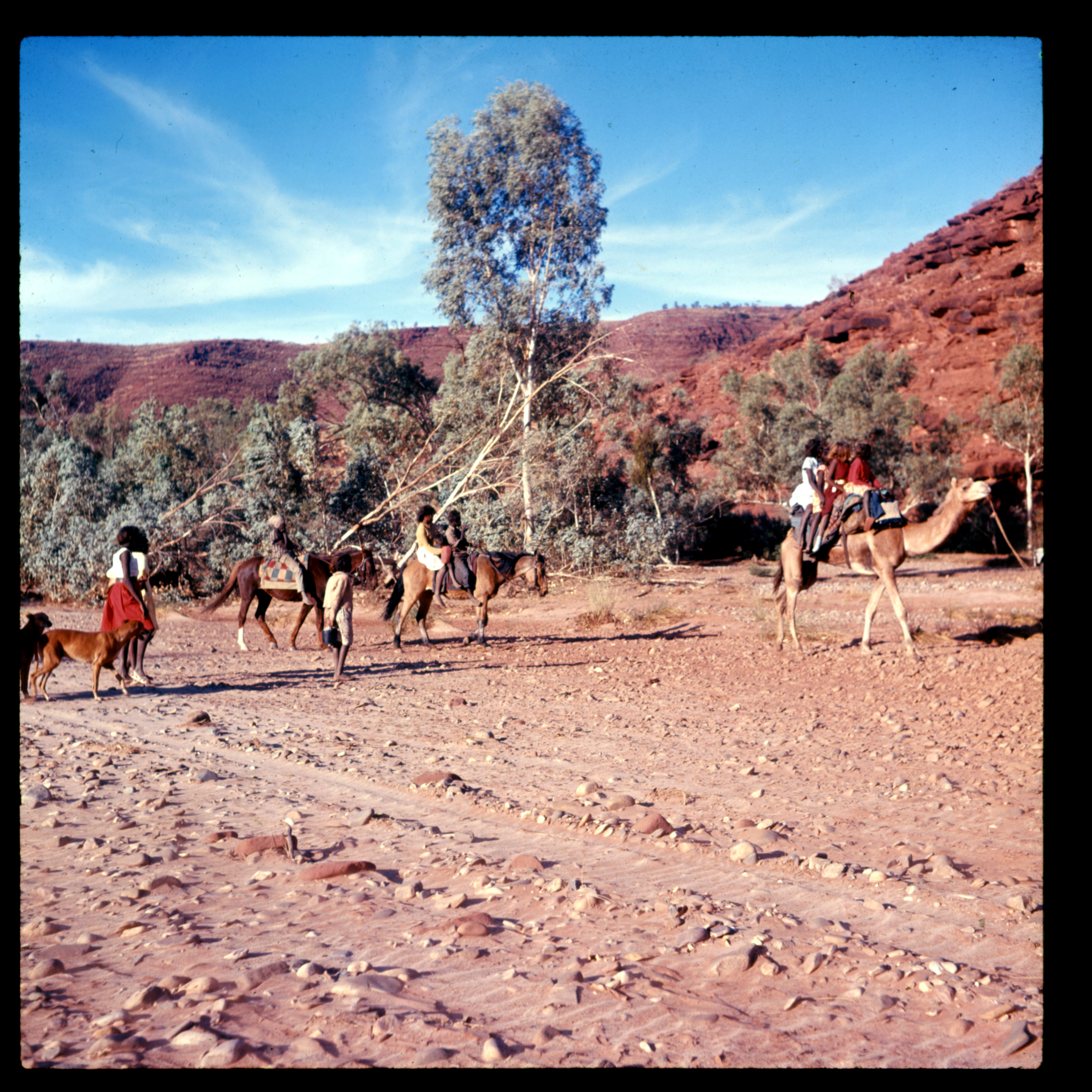
A group of Aboriginal people with domesticated animals at the Finke River, Hermannsburg

As the Afghan cameleers increasingly travelled through the inland, they encountered many Aboriginal groups. An exchange of skills, knowledge, and goods soon developed. Some cameleers assisted Aboriginal people by carrying traditional exchange goods, including red ochre or the narcotic plant pituri, along ancient trade routes such as the Birdsville Track. The cameleers also brought new commodities such as sugar, tea, tobacco, clothing, and metal tools to remote Aboriginal groups. Aboriginal people incorporated camel hair into their traditional string artefacts, and provided information on desert waters and plant resources. Some cameleers employed Aboriginal men and women to assist them on their long desert treks. This resulted in some enduring partnerships, and several marriages.

From 1928 to 1933, the missionary Ernest Kramer undertook camel safaris in Central Australia with the aim of spreading the gospel. On most journeys, he employed Arrernte man Mickey Dow Dow as cameleer, guide, and translator and sometimes a man called Barney. The first of Kramer's trips was to the Musgrave Ranges and Mann Ranges, and was sponsored by the Aborigines Friends Association, which sought a report on Indigenous living conditions. According to Kramer's biography, as the men travelled through the desert and encountered local people, they handed them boiled sweets, tea, and sugar and played Jesus Loves Me on the gramophone. At night, using a "magic lantern projector," Kramer showed slides of Christmas and the life of Christ. For many people, this was their first experience of Christmas and the event picturesquely established "an association between camels, gifts, and Christianity that was not merely symbolic but had material reality."

By the 1930s, as the cameleers became displaced by motor transport, an opportunity arose for Aboriginal people. They learnt camel-handling skills and acquired their own animals, extending their mobility and independence in a rapidly changing frontier society. This continued until at least the late 1960s. A documentary film, Camels and the Pitjantjara, made by Roger Sandall, shot in 1968 and released in 1969, follows a group of Pitjantjara men who travel out from their base at Areyonga Settlement to capture a wild camel, tame it, and add it to their domestic herds. They then use camels to help transport a large group of people from Areyonga to Papunya, three days walk.

Camels appear in Indigenous Australian art, with examples held in collections of the National Museum of Australia and Museums Victoria.

Various Australian Aboriginal languages have adopted a word for the camel, including Eastern Arrernte (kamule), Pitjantjatjara (kamula), and Alyawarr (kamwerl).

=== Camel industry ===
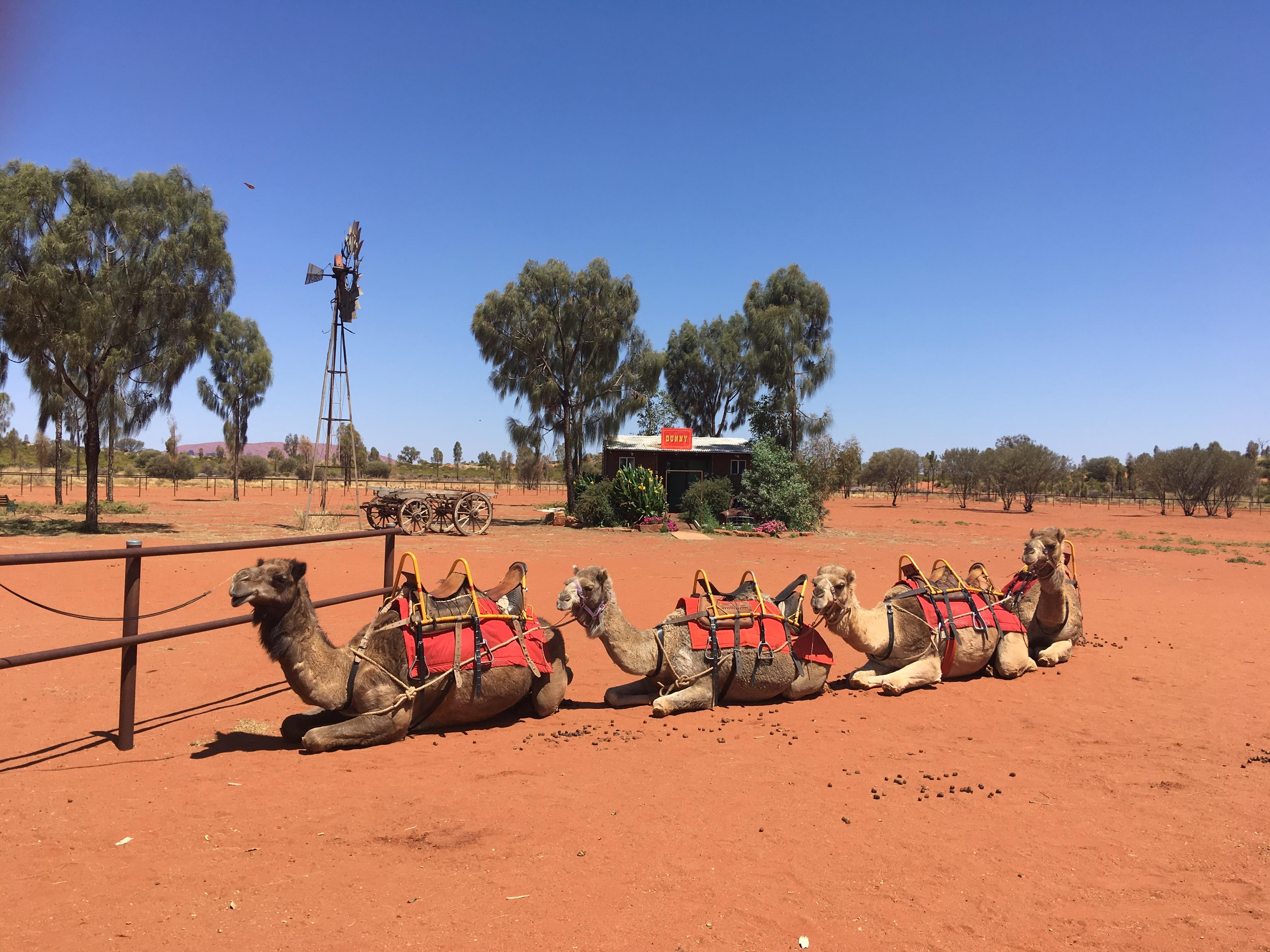
A camel farm at the Uluru

Live camels are occasionally exported to Saudi Arabia, the United Arab Emirates, Brunei, and Malaysia, where disease-free wild camels are prized as a delicacy. Australia's camels are also exported as breeding stock for Arab camel racing stables, and for use in tourist venues in places such as the United States.

==== Camel meat ====
Camel meat is consumed in Australia. A multi-species abattoir at Caboolture in Queensland run by Meramist regularly processes feral camels, selling meat into Europe, the United States, and Japan. Samex Australian Meat Company in Peterborough, South Australia, also resumed processing feral camels in 2012. It is regularly supplied by an Indigenous camel company run by Ngaanyatjarra Council on the Ngaanyatjarra Lands in Western Australia and by camels mustered on the APY Lands of South Australia. A small abattoir on Bond Springs Station just north of Alice Springs also processes small quantities of camels when operational. Exports to Saudi Arabia where camel meat is consumed began in 2002.

Camel meat was also used in the production of pet food in Australia. In 2011, the RSPCA issued a warning, after a study found cases of severe and sometimes fatal liver disease in dogs that had eaten camel meat containing the amino acid indospicine, present within some species of a genus of plants known as Indigofera.

==== Camel milk ====
Production of camel milk in Australia grew from 50,000 litres (11,000 imp gal) of camel milk in 2016 to 180,000 litres (40,000 imp gal) per annum in 2019.

Australia's first commercial-scale camel dairy, Australian Wild Camel Corporation, was established in 2015 in Clarendon, Queensland. There are a number of smaller-scale camel dairies, some growing fast: Summer Land Camels and QCamel in Central Queensland, in New South Wales' Upper Hunter District, Camel Milk Australia in South Burnett, Queensland, and Australian Camel Dairies near Perth in Western Australia. The Camel Milk Company in northern Victoria has grown from three wild camels in 2014 to over 300 in 2019, and exports mostly to Singapore, with shipments of both fresh and powdered product set to start to Thailand and Malaysia.

==== Tourism ====
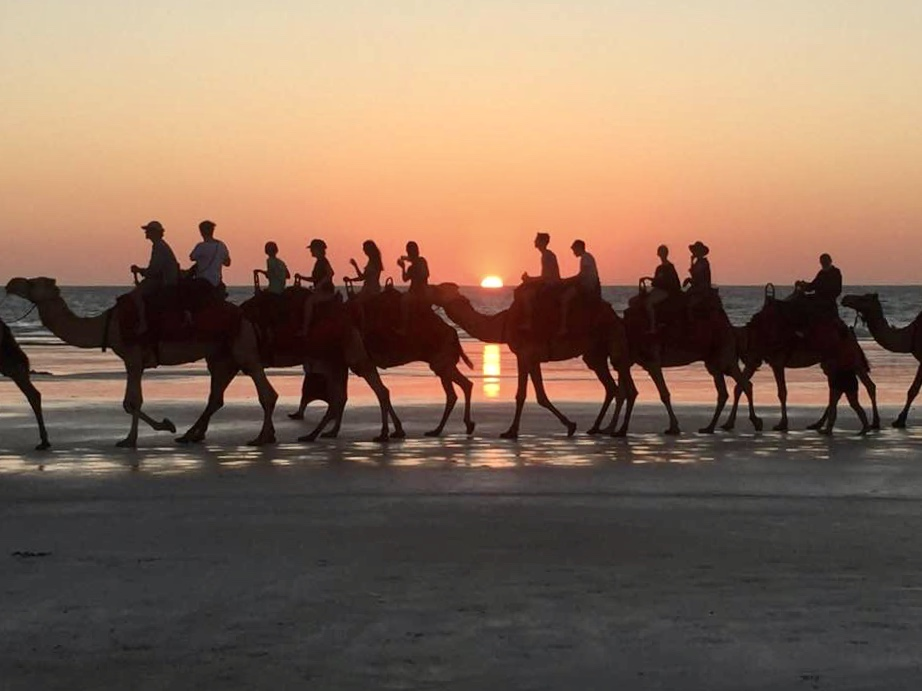
Camel riding in Cable Beach, Broome

Camel farms offering rides or treks to tourists include Kings Creek Station near Uluru, Calamunnda Camel Farm in Western Australia, Camels Australia at Stuart Well, south of Alice Springs, and Pyndan Camel Tracks in Alice Springs. Camel rides are offered on the beach at Victor Harbor in South Australia and on Cable Beach in Broome, Western Australia.

The Great Australian Camel Race was an event held in 1988 to recognise the positive effect that camels had on the development of the nation. There are also two popular camel racing events in Central Australia, the Camel Cup in Alice Springs and the Uluru Camel Cup at Uluru Camel Tours at Uluru.

== Culls ==
=== Northern Territory cull, 2009 ===
Drought conditions in Australia during the first decade of the 21st century (the "Millennium drought") were particularly harsh, leading to thousands of camels dying of thirst in the outback. The problem of invading camels searching for water became great enough for the Northern Territory Government to plan to kill as many as 6,000 camels that had become a nuisance in the community of Docker River, 500 km south west of Alice Springs, where the camels were causing severe damage in their search for food and water. The planned cull was reported internationally and drew a strong reaction.

=== National Feral Camel Action Plan, 2009–2013 ===
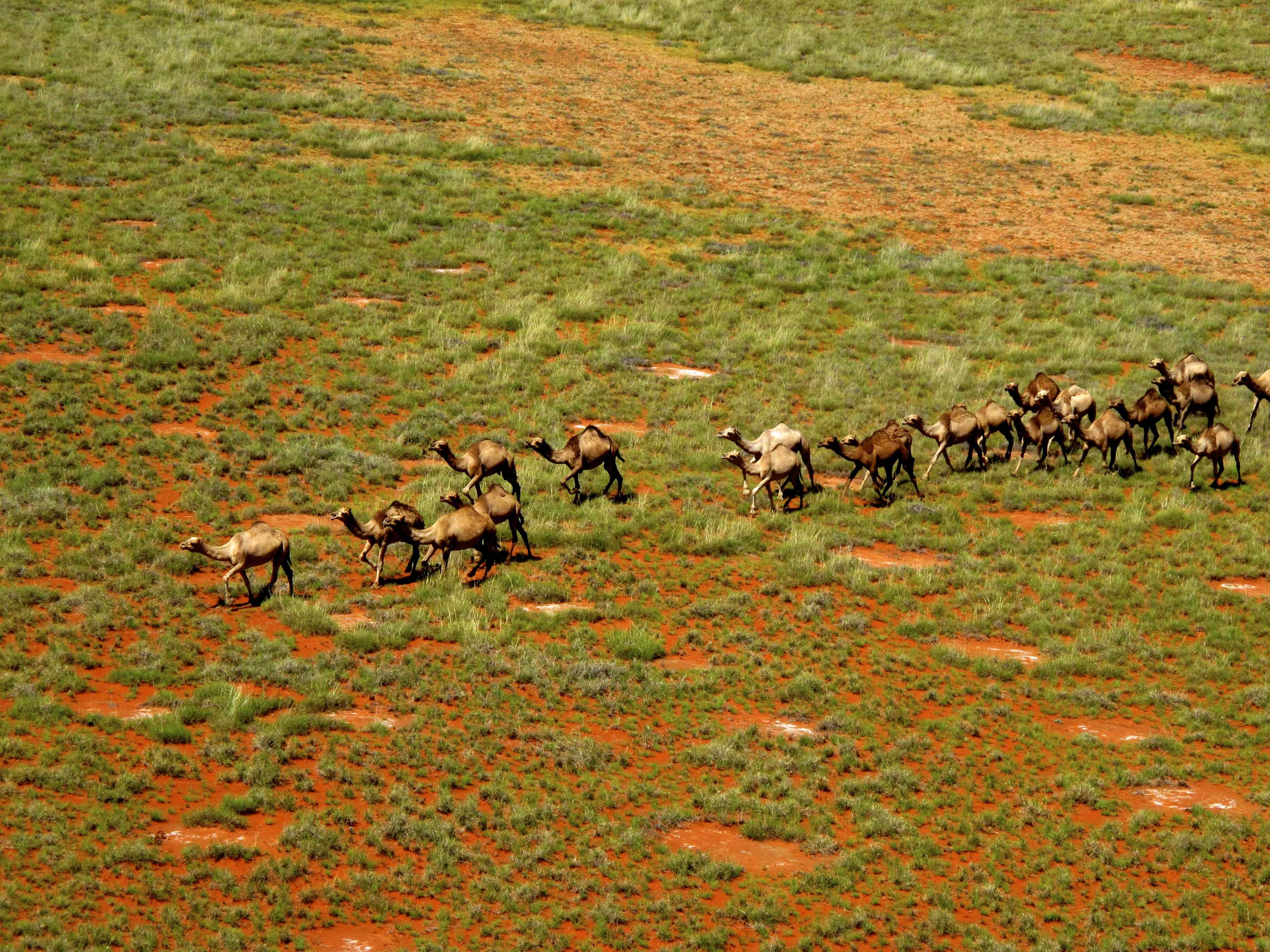
A camel herd in Newhaven Wildlife Sanctuary, Northern Territory in 2010

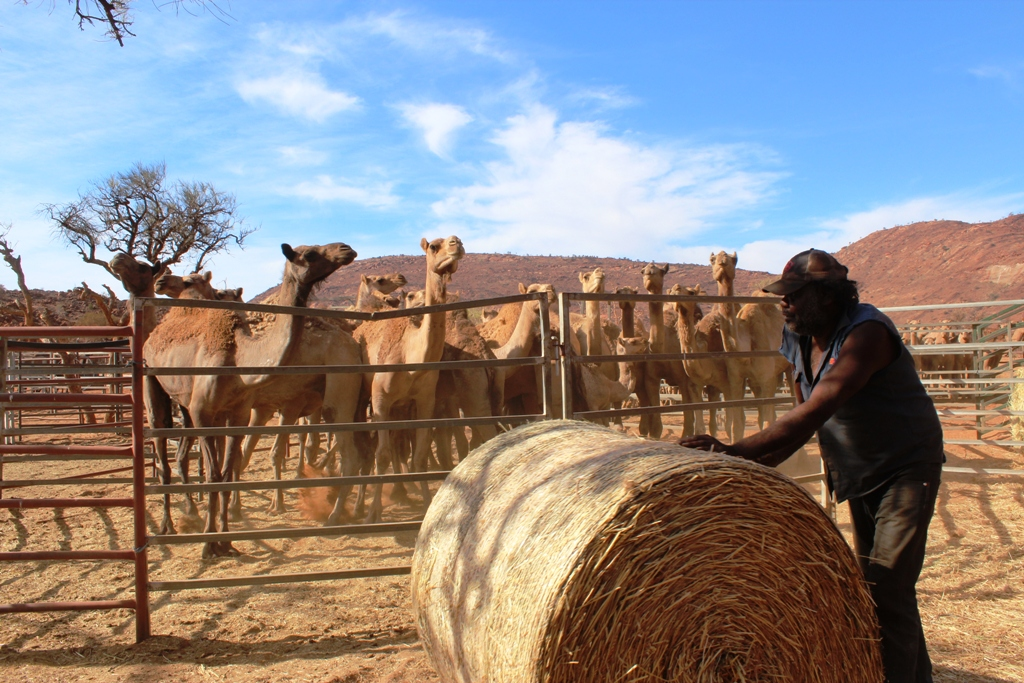
An aboriginal camel muster on the APY Lands, South Australia in 2013

The Australian Feral Camel Management Project (AFCMP) was established in 2009 and ran until 2013. It was managed by Ninti One Limited in Alice Springs funded with A$19 million from the Australian Government. It aimed to work with landholders to build their capacity to manage feral camels while reducing negative consequences at key environmental and cultural sites. The project was expected to be completed by June 2013 but received a six-month extension. It was completed A$4 million under budget.

It was a collaboration between nineteen key partners: the Governments of Australia, Western Australia, South Australia, Northern Territory and Queensland; Central Land Council, APY Lands, Ngaanyatjarra Council Inc., Kanyirninpa Jukurrpa, Pila Nguru Aboriginal Corporation, Kimberley Land Council and Western Desert Lands Aboriginal Corporation; South Australian Arid Lands NRM, Alinytjara Wilurara NRM Board, Natural Resource Management Board NT Inc. and Rangelands NRM WA; Northern Territory Cattlemen's Association; Australian Camel Industry Association; RSPCA; Australian Wildlife Conservancy; CSIRO; and Flinders University.

In November 2010 the Australian Government Department of Environment released the National Feral Camel Action Plan, a national management plan for what it defined an 'Established Pest of National Significance' in accordance with its Australian Pest Animal Strategy.

Ninti One and its partners gained consent for the culling program from the landholders for over 1,300,000 square kilometres (500,000 sq mi) of land. Different culling techniques were used for different regions in deference to concerns from the Aboriginal landholders.

At the completion of the project in 2013, the Australian Feral Camel Management Project had reduced the feral camel population by 160,000 camels. This includes over 130,000 through aerial culling, 15,000 mustered and 12,000 ground-culled (shot from vehicle) for pet meat. It estimated around 300,000 camels remained, the population increasing 10% per year. The largest individual aerial cull operation was conducted in mid-2012 in the south-west of the Northern Territory. It employed three R44 helicopter cull platforms in combination with two R22 helicopter spotting/mustering platforms. It removed 11,560 feral camels in 280 operational hours over 12 days, over 45,000 square kilometres, at a cost of around $30 per head.

The project faced criticism from some parts of the Australian camel industry, who wanted to see the feral population harvested for meat processing, the pet-meat market, or live export, arguing it would reduce waste and create jobs. Poor animal condition, high cost of freight, the lack of infrastructure in remote locations, and difficulty in gaining the necessary permissions on Aboriginal land are some of the challenges faced by the camel industry.

No ongoing funding has been committed to the program. Ninti One estimated in 2013 that A$4 million per year would be required to maintain current population levels.

=== 2020 APY lands cull ===
As a result of widespread heat, drought and the 2019–20 Australian bushfire season, feral camels were impinging more on human settlements, especially remote Aboriginal communities. In the APY lands of South Australia, they roamed the streets, damaging buildings and infrastructure in their search for water. They were also destroying native vegetation, contaminating water supplies and destroying cultural sites. On 8 January 2020 the South Australian Department for Environment and Water began a five-day cull of the camels, the first mass cull of camels in the area. Professional shooters would kill between 4,000 and 5,000 camels from helicopters, "...in accordance with the highest standards of animal welfare".
