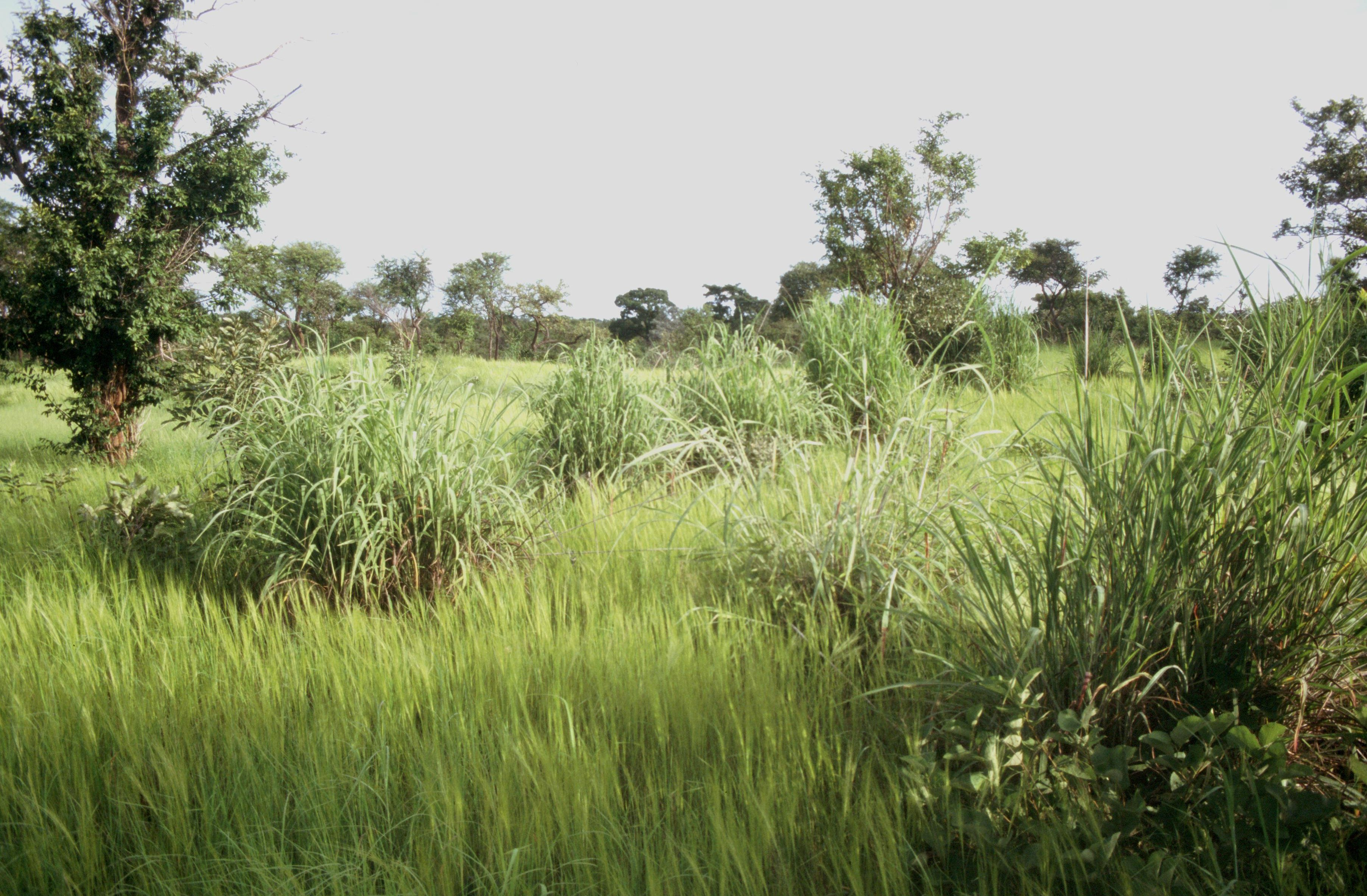

Scientific classification
- Kingdom: Plantae
- Clade: Embryophytes
- Clade: Tracheophytes
- Clade: Spermatophytes
- Clade: Angiosperms
- Clade: Monocots
- Clade: Commelinids
- Order: Poales
- Family: Poaceae
- Subfamily: Panicoideae
- Genus: Andropogon
- Species: A. gayanus

Binomial name
- Andropogon gayanus Kunth

= Andropogon gayanus =

Species of grass

Andropogon gayanus, commonly known as gamba grass, Rhodesian blue grass, tambuki grass, and other names, is a species of grass native to most of the tropical and subtropical savannas of Africa.

== History and naming ==
Andropogon gayanus was scientifically named by 1833 from the Greek words andro (man) and pogon (beard) describing the tiny flower spikes. Its common names include gamba grass, bluestem (Africa, Australia); Rhodesian andropogon (southern Africa); Rhodesian blue grass (Zimbabwe); onga, tambuki grass (north-west Africa); and sadabahar (India).

== Description ==
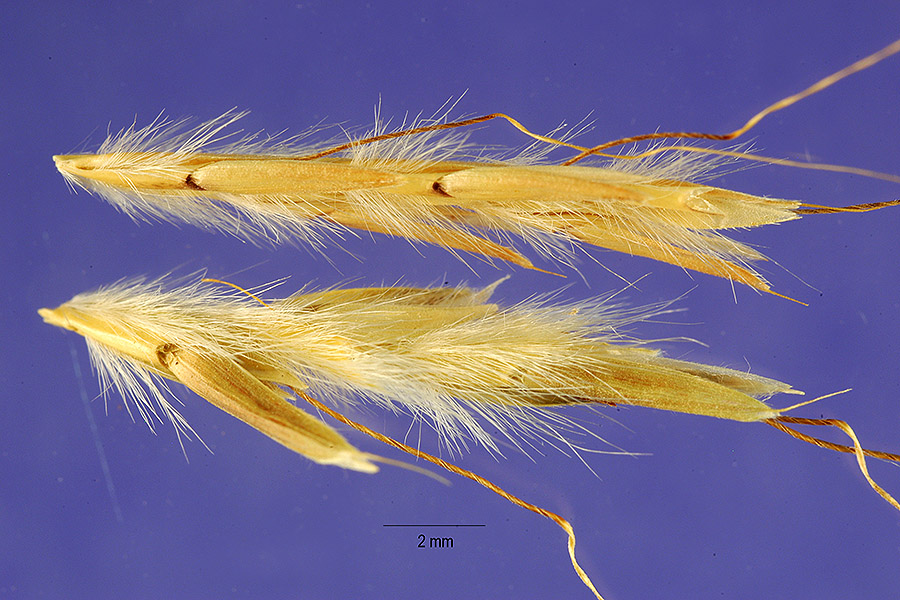
Andropogon gayanus seeds

This tufting perennial bunchgrass can grow 4 m (13 ft) tall and 70 cm (2.3 ft) in diameter, and has hairy leaves. Most of its roots are fibrous, spreading close to the surface of the soil for up to 1 m (3 ft 3 in), but it also has thick cord roots which store starch and anchor the plant as well as vertical roots able to extract water from a greater depth during the dry season.

It produces large numbers of light, fluffy seeds (up to 244,000 seeds each year, with 65% viability), which can be spread by wind, animals or machinery. It spreads rapidly where vegetation is disturbed, but most seeds fall within 5 m (16 ft) of the parent plant.

== Habitat ==
The grass is native to most of the tropical and subtropical savannas of Africa, also extending southwards into Mozambique, Botswana, Namibia and South Africa in regions with long dry seasons. It occurs naturally in xerophytic grasslands on doleritic, sandy or clay soils, at altitudes of up to 1,500 m (4,900 ft), and is very drought-tolerant. However it does not do well where mean minimum temperatures dip below 4.4 degrees Celsius, and it is not frost-tolerant. It has also been introduced around the world as a pasture crop in Australia and Brazil.

== Uses ==
A. gayanus was introduced as a pasture crop in many parts of the world, including Australia, tropical countries of the Americas, as well as naturalising in Brazil It has also been introduced in Nigeria to reclaim land that has been overgrazed.

Strips of the grass are also planted in millet fields help to reduce wind erosion of the soil.

In some African countries, the stems are also used as thatch and for making pen.

== Environmental impacts ==
Gamba grass forms dense patches, out-competing native species and altering ecosystems. Areas of dense infestation have a significantly higher fire risk than native pastures. It is highly resistant to both cutting and fire, and ungrazed tussocks can generate very intense fires, leading to loss of tree cover and long-term environmental damage. It replaces native grasses, reducing natural biodiversity on ungrazed land. Being highly invasive, it can move into conservation areas, semi-urban residential land and mining leases.

This has led to its declaration as a noxious species, officially being declared a "Weed of national significance" in Australia since 2012. Western Australia, the Northern Territory, and Queensland all have state legislation which prohibits planting of new plants and requires land managers to control infestations.

=== Northern Territory ===
Gamba grass was introduced into the Northern Territory of Australia in 1931 for trial as cattle feed. By 2024 there were large swathes of the plant over 532,900 ha (1,317,000 acres) between Darwin and Katherine. As of December 2025, despite ongoing efforts to kill it off, gamba grass covered around 30,000 ha (74,000 acres) of the 144,000-hectare (360,000-acre) Litchfield National Park, contributing to worsening fire seasons. Two zones of management have been declared. Class A requires eradication and class B requires growth and spread to be controlled. The Gamba Army, a partnership between the Northern Territory Government and Territory NRM have been working to control spread in priority areas. However, federal funding for the Gamba Army is due to end in June 2026.

=== Queensland ===
Gamba grass was imported into the state of Queensland as a pasture grass in 1942, but was not planted on a large scale until about 1983. Almost all known locations in Queensland are in areas below 980 m (3,220 ft) altitude that receive 400–1,500 mm (16–59 in) annual rainfall. It is declared a class 2 pest under the Land Protection (Pest and Stock Route Management) Act 2002, making it an offence to introduce, keep or supply the species without a permit and requiring land managers to keep land free of the species.

=== Western Australia ===
Gamba grass has effectively been eradicated from Western Australia, where infestations were not as widespread as the NT and Queensland. The Gamba Grass Eradication Program, a collaborative project supported by the Department of Biodiversity, Conservation and Attractions, the Department of Primary Industries and Regional Development, El Questro Station and Kimberley Rangelands Biosecurity Association began in 2011 and has been highly successful. It reduced the number of plants to 3,000 by 2018, leaving just 23 by 2020. They found only eight plants in the 2021 wet season. However it was receiving no funding from the federal government in 2022, and monitoring is necessary for a further five years to ensure that there is no future spread.
