= The Great Australian Camel Race =

1988 event

The Great Australian Camel Race was a camel endurance event held in mid-1988. It is described as the longest animal endurance race ever held. The event was the inspiration of the Australian property millionaire Arthur Earle, who wanted to organise an endurance race to celebrate the harsh outback. The race was to inject more celebration into Australia's Bicentennial year while also raising funds for the Royal Flying Doctor Service. The race also intended to recognise the positive impact that Afghan cameleers had on the exploration of central Australia, and highlight the importance these animals had in the development of these arid lands.

== The event ==
The planned route was 3,236 km (2,011 mi) long spanning from the centre of Australia, starting at Ayers Rock, to the east coast of Australia ending on the Gold Coast and World Expo 88. There was a $100,000 total cash prize, with $45,000 for the overall winner and prizes for individual leg winners.

The race was broken down into six legs each with check points:(source: Australasian geographical magazine Geo Volume 11 number 3)

- Leg 1: Ayers Rock to Alice Spring (Northern Territory 410 km)
- Leg 2: Alice Springs to Boulia (Northern Territory to Queensland 761 km)
- Leg 3: Boulia to Longreach (Queensland app. 604 km)
- Leg 4: Longreach to Charleville (Queensland app. 530 km)
- Leg 5: Charleville to Warwick, Queensland (Queensland app. 1242 km)
- Leg 6: Warwick to Gold Coast (Queensland app. 140 km)

Australia's elite SASR (Special Air Service Regiment) along with a team from the 2/4 Battalion Royal Australian Regiment, competitors from the United States, Australia's leading camel handlers, adventurers, and ex-marathon runners entered the event. The army organised the legs alongside competing themselves. In addition, they were the best equipped for the event with hundreds of support personnel and vehicles. The competition was timed according to how long it took each participant to finish a leg, much like a vehicle rally. The Australian Army's 1st Signal Regiment based at Enoggera Barracks, supported the race by providing a vital safety link and strategically positioned radio communication vehicles along the entire length of each days racing.

== Results ==
The event began on 23 April 1988 with 69 competitors. Adventurer Alby Mangels was one of the starters but soon had to drop out. Often due to issues with the camels, 19 of the teams did not make it to the second stage. For the next three months, competitors battled disease, floods, and dangerous traffic conditions (as the last 2,000 km were along highways). The clear early leaders were the SASR and Gordon O'Connell (who had trained with his camel for 10 months prior to the event).

A total of 24 competitors completed the event with the winner, Gordon, finishing in 480 hours, the second-place SASR finishing 34 hours after that, and third-place Steve French 28 hours after that. Calculating these times into an average equates to O'Connell covering 168 km every day. In addition to this, the final distance he won by had been reached by the second leg of the race. He won the first four of the six legs, even when he was hospitalised with kidney failure from shigella dysentery (which struck 80% of the other competitors too) on the second leg. The race was put on hold until they were well enough to continue.

After the event O'Connell went to retire his camel, Carla, when a dispute broke out over ownership. Because she had won and had become well known, the original person O'Connell was involved with before the race, made claim to her and half the winnings and wanted to use her name to start his camel business. After close to six years of litigation, O'Connell was granted the winnings and awarded damages and ownership of the camel (until her death in 2014).

== Media ==
The event featured in the documentary produced for the ABC by Orana Films and photographed in the Australasian geographical magazine Geo (Volume 11 number 3 page 97). It also featured in a 106 minute video, released in 1988, titled The Great camel race: the longest animal endurance race ever. On the 35th anniversary of the race, the ABC released a podcast with interviews of surviving participants.

== See also ==
- Camels in Australia
