= Territory Natural Resource Management =

Australian nonprofit organisation

- Founded: 2003
- Type: Non-Profit Organization
- Purpose: Sustainable environmental management
- Headquarters: Darwin, Australia
- Location: Northern Territory
- Key people: Karen May
- Website: https://www.territorynrm.org.au/

Territory Natural Resource Management (TNRM) is an independent nonprofit organisation based in Darwin in the Northern Territory of Australia.

== Background ==
Established in 2003, it works with landholders, community groups, industry and government to ensure sustainable management of water, land, soils and biodiversity, based on a four-year plan developed for the Northern Territory's key biodiversity regions.

Each year it holds the TNRM NT Territory Natural Resource Management Awards at its annual conference.

== Key projects ==
- Forage Mapping for Resilient Landscapes
- Gamba Army - partnership with the Northern Territory Government to manage the declared weed gamba grass in priority areas.
- Territory Conservation Agreements
